= Buddha Bar compilation albums =

Series of compilation albums

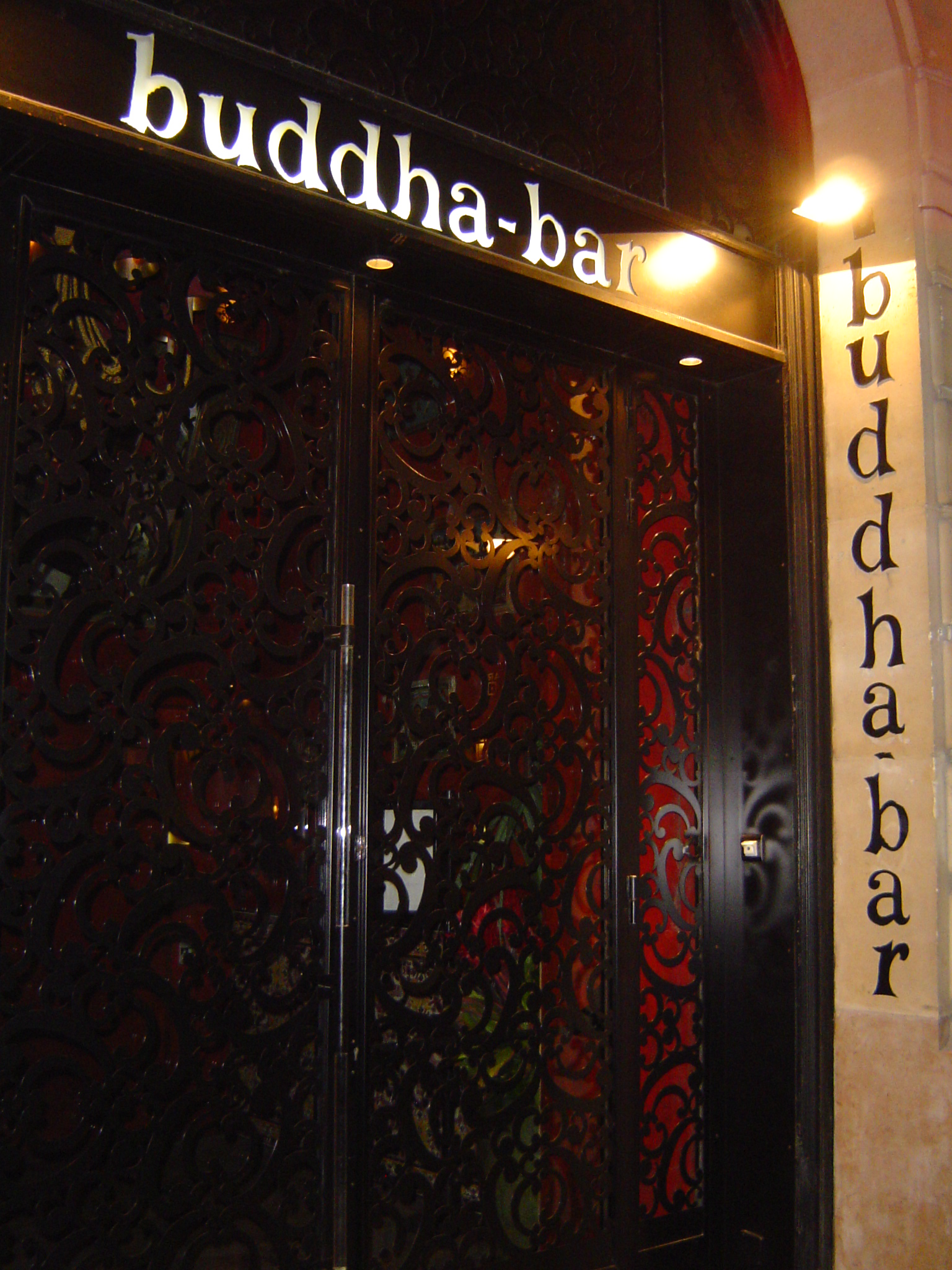
Buddha Bar in Paris

The Buddha Bar compilation albums are a series of compilation albums issued by the French Buddha Bar establishment created by restaurateur Raymond Visan and DJ and interior designer Claude Challe. The albums, which have been published since 1999, consist of songs by international artists in such genres as lounge, chill-out, and world music.

In 2001, a Billboard magazine critic placed the compilation in his "top ten" musical events of the year, stating of proprietor Claude Challe that "[t]he legendary master of pop and dance music in France has aroused the attention of the global chill-out community with this series of mixed compilations", and concluding that "Buddha Bar is not only a good restaurant in France but also one of the best music experiments to come out of France in the past few years". On a more critical note, the Oxford Handbook of Music Revival describes the music of the Buddha Bar collection as "close to muzak-like mixtures with neither recognizable original components nor clearly identifiable new structures".

Challe compiled and produced the first two Buddha Bar albums. The series thereafter continued with different DJs, including DJ Ravin, Sam Popat, and David Visan (son of Buddha Bar founder Raymond Visan). The compilations have also included a few original compositions, credited to Buddha Bar.

== Discography ==
=== Buddha Bar I (1999) ===
Mixed by Claude Challe

- CD1 (Dinner) (75 min: 45 s)
1. Craig Armstrong – "Weather Storm"
2. Sina Vodjani – "Straight to the Heart"
3. Deepak Ram – "Kitu"
4. Tulku – "Anni Rose"
5. Zehava Ben – "What Will Be?"
6. Zohar – "The Merciful One"
7. Pink Martini – "La Soledad"
8. Aria – "Un Bel Dì"
9. Zen Men – "Une table à trois"
10. Zen Men – "El Fuego" (Trote King Mix)
11. Anima Sound System – "Shalom"
12. Jai Uttal – "Guru Bramha"
13. Tulku – "Meena Devi (Goddess)"
14. Armen Chakmakian – "Gypsy Rain"
- CD2 (Party) (71 min: 54 s)
1. Anima Sound System – "68" (Original Mix)
2. Le Duc – "Touareg"
3. MKL vs. Soy Sos – "Skin" (Original Abstract Mix)
4. Faithless – "Drifting Away" (Paradiso Mix)
5. Intro – "Psique"
6. Kevin Yost – "Two Wrongs Making It Right"
7. Huff & Herb – "Feeling Good" (Epic Mix)
8. So Emotional – "All By Myself"
9. Byron Stingily – "Flying High" (Masters at Work Brazilian Vocal Mix)
10. Nusrat Fateh Ali Khan – "Piya Re Piya Re" (Remix)
11. Etti Ankri – "Eshebo"
12. Malik Adouane – "Shaft"
13. Metin Arolat – "Elveda"
14. Willy DeVille – "Demasiado Corazón" (Live Version)

=== Buddha Bar II (2000) ===
Mixed by Claude Challe

- CD1 (Dinner) (72 min: 31 s)
1. Trumpet Thing – "Need You (Right Now)" (Ambient Mix)
2. Omer Faruk Tekbilek – "I Love You"
3. Consuelo Luz – "Los Bilbilicos (The Nightingales)"
4. Karunesh – "Alibaba"
5. Deepak Chopra feat. Demi Moore – "Desire"
6. Govinda – "In Through Time"
7. Oliver Shanti & Friends – "Onòn Mweng (Rainbird)"
8. Atman – "Spirit"
9. Deadbeats – "Funky for You"
10. De-Phazz feat. Pat Appleton – "Mambo Craze" (Extended Edit)
11. Nino – "Amor Amor"
12. Sa Trincha – "Smell of Paradise"
13. Intro – "Farruca"
14. Funky Lowlives – "Nota Bossa"
- CD2 (Party) (74 min: 09 s)
1. Sun Trust – "How Insensitive"
2. Rollercone – "Daydreaming"
3. Wally Brill – "A Loop in Time" (Banco De Gaia Remix)
4. La Roca – "Drama of Japan"
5. Great Barrier – "Cairo" (Duke Monster Mix)
6. Angel Tears – "Inshalla"
7. dZihan & Kamien – "After"
8. Suba – "Felicidade"
9. Sidestepper – "Logozo"
10. Kerri Chandler & Joe Clausell – "Escravos de Jo" (Robust Horn Remix)
11. Soul Ascendants – "The String Thing"
12. Attaboy – "New World"

=== Buddha Bar III (2001) ===
Mixed by DJ Ravin

- CD 1 (Dream) (66 min: 59 s)
1. Nicos – "Secret Love"
2. John Kaizan Neptune – "Golden Lotus"
3. Yorgos Kazantzis – "Sorocos"
4. Karunesh – "Solitude"
5. Platon Andritsakis – "Via Pajuta iii"
6. Tulku – "Spiral Dance"
7. Manuel Franjo – "Solo por tu amor"
8. Gustavo Montesano & The Royal Philharmonic Orchestra – "Tango Serenato de Schubert"
9. Adrian Enescu – "Invisible Movies Part 1"
10. Deepak Ram – "A Night in Lenasia"
11. Amr Diab – "Tamally Maak"
12. Frederick Rousseau – "Danya"
13. Eden – "Mavis"
14. Oliver Shanti & Friends – "Sacral Nirvana"
15. Jesse Cook – "On Walks the Night"
- CD 2 (Joy) (76 min: 49 s)
1. Gotan Project – "Triptico"
2. Zeb – "Sufism"
3. Osman Ismen – "Kale"
4. Freeman – "My Dear Masters"
5. Ekova – "Starlight in Daden" (Aurora Remix)
6. Talvin Singh – "Veena"
7. Ravi Prasad – "Indian Gipsy"
8. Hasan Cihat Orter – "Flirting Shadows 2 (Schnaz Longa)
9. Anna Vissi – "Den Me Agapas"
10. Nacho Sotomayor – "Don't Do Anything"
11. Badmarsh & Shri – "Sitar Ritual"
12. Kodo – "Strobe's Nanafushi" (Satori Mix)
13. Livin' in Da Ghetto feat. Moktar – "Arabian Song" (Da Ghetto Fuckiro Club)

=== Buddha Bar IV (2002) ===
Mixed by David Visan

- CD 1 (Dinner) (63 min: 40 s)
1. Frederick Rousseau – "La Fille De Pekin"
2. Tibet Project – "Tibet (A Passage To...)"
3. Jade Or – "Opium"
4. Nitin Sawhney – "Moonrise"
5. Nash Didan – "A Window of My Dreams"
6. Agricantus – "Amatevi"
7. Manuel Franjo – "Tiempo"
8. Guadalupe Pineda Con Los Tres Ases – "Historia De Un Amor"
9. Armen Chakmakian – "Distant Lands"
10. Nickodemus – "Desert Dancer" (Zeb's Slow Camel Ride Remix)
11. Flam – "Monsoon"
12. Tulku – "Rahda Ramana"
13. Natasa Theodoridou – "Tora to Thimithikes"
14. Gotan Project – "Una Musica Brutal"
- CD 2 (Drink) (60 min: 20 s)
1. Outsized – "Karma" (Extended Mix)
2. Time Passing – "Party People"
3. Panjabi MC – "Mundian to Bach Ke"
4. Ishtar – "Comme Toi"
5. Chris Spheeris – "Dancing with the Muse"
6. David Visan & Carlos Campos – "Irish Coffee"
7. Llorca – "The Novel Sound"
8. Loving Paris – "Loco"
9. Roland Louis – "Percussion's Rhythm (Dimitri from Paris Re-Edit)"
10. Dan Lacksman's Alliance – "Louxor in Vegas"
11. Angie Samiou – "Agoraki Mou
12. Amr Diab – "Aktar Wahed"
13. Celia Cruz – "Yo Vivire (I Will Survive)"
14. Usual Masters – "Nocturne in Paris"

==== Buddha Bar IV sales ====
| Region | Certification | Certified units/sales |
|---|---|---|
| France | — | 30,000 |
| Worldwide | — | 65,000 |

=== Buddha Bar V (2003) ===
Mixed by David Visan

- CD 1 (Dinner) (66 min: 36 s)
1. Jade Or feat. Bielka Nemirovski – "Nie Kantshaietsa"
2. Mikis Theodorakis – "I've Kept a Hold of My Life"
3. Refractory feat. J.C. Sindress & Youn Sun Nah – "Road"
4. Trumpet Thing – "Far Away"
5. Mystic Rhythms Band – "Gesso's Guitar Song"
6. Angelique Kidjo – "Iemanja"
7. Elie Karam – "Baadima"
8. David Visan & Michaël Winter feat. Ani Choying Drolma – "Tamtra Tibet"
9. Mariza – "Loucura"
10. Maria Papadopoulou – "Maskaremeni"
11. David Visan & Carlos Campos – "Indra Story"
12. Laurent Dury – "Silk Road"
13. Alihan Samedov – "Sen Gelmez Oldun"
14. Frederick Rousseau – "Princess W. Cheng"
15. Operatica – "Mon Amour"
- CD 2 (Drink) (66 min: 58 s)
1. Emma Shapplin – "La Notte Etterna"
2. dZihan & Kamien – "Just You & I"
3. Sarma – "Muel"
4. DJ Disse – "Egyptian Disco" (Buddha Bar Edit)
5. Gipsyland – "Salaam" (duet with Anoushka)
6. Mondo Candido – "Meglio stasera"
7. Latour – "Blue"
8. Despina Vandi – "Gia"
9. Giampiero Ponte feat. Moran – "Sphynx" (Club Mix)
10. Julie – "Blinded" (Original Opera Mix)
11. David Visan – "Czardas"
12. Rubin Steiner – "Wunderlande"
13. Ritchie Lawrence – "Laurence d'Arabie" (Ambient Mix)

=== Siddharta, Spirit of Buddha Bar (2003) ===
Mixed by DJ Ravin

- CD1 (Emotion)
1. Bliss – Wish You Were Here
2. Riccardo Eberspacher – Osiride
3. Mars Lasar – Sacrifice
4. Grassskirt – Burundi Bedsong
5. Nicos – Passione
6. BNM Corp. – Bach to the Future
7. Mikael Delta feat. Tania Tsanaklidou – Mia Agapi Mikri (Faithful Mix)
8. Max Chorny – Gde Trava ? (Siddharta Remix)
9. Sezen Aksu – Adi Menekse
10. Dreamcatcher (2) – Seventh Heaven
11. Michalis Nikoloudis – Déjà Vu
12. Infernal – Adeel
13. Bliss – Long Life to You My Friend (Christophe Goze Remix)
14. Al-pha-X – Mi Corazon
15. Cantoma – Marisi
- CD2 (Passion)
1. Alihan Samedov – Sen Gelmez Oldun
2. Ziroq – Ziroq
3. Melih Kibar – Mesaj
4. Mikael Delta – No One
5. Santos – Ke Dolor (Banzai Republic Remix)
6. Agricantus – Orbi Terrarum (DJ Rocca Deepmix for Maffia Sound System)
7. Rey De Copás – Frontera Del Ensueno (Jerez De La Frontera Mix)
8. Oi-Va-Voi feat. Ben Hassan – D'Ror Yikra
9. El Cosmo Group – Maha Lakshmi
10. Femi Kuti – Do Your Best (Faze Action Remix)
11. Dr Kucho! – Negritos Mogambos
12. Big Bud – Mombassa
13. DJ Aqeel – Tu Tu Hai Wahi

=== Siddharta, Spirit of Buddha Bar Vol. 2 (2003) ===
Mixed by DJ Ravin

- CD1 (Awakening)
1. Bliss – Sleep Will Come
2. Afterlife feat. Cathy Battistessa – Speck of Gold
3. Ratnabali – Breeze (Baul Dimension & Murphy Remix)
4. Cirque du Soleil – A Tale-Bliss (Munchausen Mix)
5. Banzai Republic – Never Feel
6. Karsh Kale – Letting Go
7. Sand System – Lover's Nocturne
8. Electro Mana – In Flight
9. Nitin Sawhney – Fallen Angels
10. Cantoma – Moonsmith
11. Hidden Id – Afro Dub
12. Gaudi – Sufani
13. Baul Dimension – Lake Palace
14. Bent – King Wisp
15. Dariuz – Dusk
- CD2 (Euphoria)
1. Ganga – Luna
2. Grassskirt – Tonite
3. Lonesome Echo Production feat. Mutabaraku – Spirit of Drums
4. Grassskirt – Mamaso
5. Microman & Vito Ingrosso feat. Angel – Pretend (Early in the Morning)
6. Sekouba Bambino – Découragé (Charles Webster Remix)
7. Lonesome Echo Production feat. Liliana Chachian – No Colo Do Mar
8. H-Foundation – Passage of Time
9. Cirque du Soleil – Sun Drum Fun (Carmen Rizzo Toumany Remix)
10. Choc Electrique – Da Hood (Part 2) (Philippe Lussan Remix)
11. Cirque du Soleil – Oscillum
12. Pete Tha Zouk vs Di Simmon – Enchantments
13. Native ID – Devotion (Original Mix)

=== Buddha Bar VI (2004) ===
Mixed by DJ Ravin

- CD 1 (Rebirth) (63 min: 24 s)
1. B-Tribe – "Angelic Voices" (Rebirth Remix)
2. 1 Giant Leap – "The Way You Dream"
3. Dolphin Boy – "Shake It Loose"'
4. Daniel Masson – "Sonargaon"
5. Deew – "She Will Never Learn"
6. Erik Satie – "Gnossienne No. 1 (Buddha Bar Remix)"
7. Cellar 55 – "Por-Do-Sol"
8. Ryukyu Underground – "Kanasando" (Rebirth Remix)
9. Ganga – "Chair"
10. Dos Hombres – "The Alkemyst"
11. Slow Train – "Naturally"
12. Quicksound – "Cold Winter"
13. Touch and Go – "Straight to... Number One" (Dreamcatcher's Remix)
14. Cantoma – "Essarai"
- CD 2 (Rejoice) (63 min: 47 s)
1. Baul Dimension – "Bangla Soul"
2. Table vs. Ludovico Einaudi – "Memory"
3. Slow Train – "Trail of Dawn"
4. Loopless – "Pink Blue Hotel"
5. Télépopmusik – "Breathe" (Banzai Republic's X-Hale Remix)
6. Sarah Vaughan – "Whatever Lola Wants (Gotan Project Remix)"
7. Bliss – "Manvantara"
8. Baul Dimension – "Baul Dimension"
9. Afterlife – "Sunrise" (DJ Thunda & K20 Allstars Mix)
10. PQM feat. Pilgrim Soul – "Nameless"
11. Casa Flava – "De Moma De" (Paris & Sharp Remix)
12. Perfect Sense – "Bumba" (Stereo Sax Mix)

=== Buddha Bar VII (2005) ===
Mixed by DJ Ravin & David Visan

- CD 1 (Sarod) (77 min: 07 s)
1. Bliss – "Breathe"
2. My Phuong Nguyen & Thierry David – "Huong Vietnam"
3. Riccardo Eberspacher – "Light Signs"'
4. Al-Pha X – "An Indian Summer"
5. Afterlife feat. Dannii Minogue – "Take Me Inside (Christophe Goze Mix)"
6. Ustad Sultan Khan – "Aja Maji (Sacred Rhythm Version by Joe Claussell)"
7. Bigtétény's Finest – "Lovasok A Szakadék Felé"
8. Federico Aubele – "Postales"
9. Vargo – "The Moment"
10. Salif Keita – "Moussoulou (Remixed by Charles Webster)"
11. José Padilla – "Light my Heart"
12. Bebel Gilberto – "Aganjú" (John Beltran Remix)
13. Ramasutra – "Magma Mama"
14. Peppe Barra – "Core Nire" (Azoia Remix)
15. Da Lata – "Distracted Minds"
16. Laid Back – "Happy Dreamer"
- CD 2 (Sarangi) (71 min: 03 s)
1. Kirpi – "The Song"
2. Sainkho Namtchylak – "Ohm Suaa (Remixed by Martin Morales)"
3. Lonesome Echo feat. Mutabaraku – "Spirit of Drums" (SUMO Afrobounce Remix)
4. DJ Nasha – "Flute Fantasy"
5. Ryukyu Underground – "Mo Ashibi" (Jason Bentley Remix)
6. Supervielle – "Perfume (Remixed by Campo)2
7. Mambayaga Project – "Joy on a Stick"
8. King Britt presents Oba Funke – "Uzoamaka"
9. Phatjak vs. DJ Hamoodi – "Ritmo Caliente"'
10. Harem – "Medusa"
11. Mo' Horizons – "Drum'n Boogaloo (Full Vocal Mix)"
12. Mambayaga Project – "Clockwork (Shantel vs Mahala Rai Banda Remix)"
13. Tito Rodriguez – "Mama Guela (STUHR Remix)"
14. Les Negresses Vertes – "Sous Le Soleil De Bodega (Bodega Di Moko)"

=== Buddha Bar VIII (2006) ===
Mixed by Sam Popat

- CD 1 (Paris) (65 min: 51 s)
1. Sanja Ilić and Balkanika – "Korana"
2. Naomi – "White"
3. Alihan Samedov – "Son Nefes" (Deep mix)
4. Panjabi Hit Squad feat. Manpreet Kaur – "Hasdi Hasdi" (Hit Squad Mix)
5. Antaeus – "Palm of the Prophet"
6. Out of Phase – "Desire" (Tiger Mix 2006)
7. Yasmin Levy – "Madre, Si Hesto Hazina"
8. Pompon Finkelstein – "Lost in Reflection (La Forza del Destino by G. Verdi)"
9. Shubha Mudgal – "The Awakening"
10. Shpongle – "Once Upon the Sea of Blissful Awareness" (Esionjim Remix)
11. Sam Popat & Alexandre Scheffer – "Golden Ring"
12. Nomadix – "Chura Liya"
13. Elkin Marin – "Wallanwala"
14. Stefano Saletti & Piccola Banda Ikona – "Tagama"
15. Alhoeverah – "Tan Cañi"
- CD 2 (New York) (75 min: 16 s)
1. Angel Tears – "Mystic Desire"
2. Vasilisa – "Oblak/Cloud"
3. Ensemble Ethnique – "Asilah"
4. DJ Bool presents Jerk House Connection – "Mother Blues"
5. Belladonna – "Ebatule"
6. Sanja Ilic and Balkanika – "Balkan Vocals"
7. Alberto "Beto" Uṅa – "Angels in the Desert" (Original Profundo Mix)
8. Bongoloverz feat. Ursula Cuesta – "La Esperanza (Hope & Faith)"
9. Dan Marciano – "Good Morning Paris" (Dr Kucho! Remix)
10. Kirpi – "My Name Is Kirpi"
11. Orient Expressions – "Istanbul 1:26 a.m."
12. Biber – "Turta"
13. Sam Popat & Alexandre Scheffer – "Dil Mera"
14. Yves Larock – "Nomadic Knights"
15. Schiller – "I Feel You"

=== Buddha Bar IX (2007) ===
Mixed by DJ Ravin

- CD 1 (Royal Victoria) (74 min: 05 s)
1. Bardo State – "Sospiro"
2. Mystic Diversions – "Flight BA0247"
3. Amanaska – "Sleep"
4. Hess Is More – "Yes Boss"
5. Koop – "Koop Island Blues"
6. Eccodek – "Mongolia on the Line"
7. Serafim Tsotsonis – "Wood Street"
8. Existence – "Heart Beat of Life"
9. The Lushlife Project – "Essence of Our Origins"
10. Michalis Koumbios – "Astradeni"
11. York feat. Asheni – "Iceflowers"
12. David Lowe's Dreamcatcher – "I Know Jayne"
13. Nikonn – "Sunday"
14. Kenneth Bager feat. Julee Cruise – "Fragment Two... The First Picture"
15. Burhan Öçal – "Bugu Jazz"
- CD 2 (Barons Court) (77 min: 23 s)
1. Sunset Blvd – "Mrs Daisy May"
2. Cosmic Orient – "La Pila"
3. Djumma Soundsystem – "Les Djinns" (Trentemoller Remix)
4. Carmen Rizzo feat. Grant Lee Phillips – "As the Day Breaks" (Montreal Remix)
5. Massivan – "Daydream"
6. Cirque du Soleil – "Africa" (Quicksound/Alain Vinet Remix)
7. Rocco – "Roots 4 Acid"
8. Passion of Percussion – "Last Chance"
9. Novalima – "Machete"
10. Parov Stelar – "Chambermaid Swing"
11. OMFO – "Choban in Space"
12. Otros Aires – "Amor Que Se Baïla"
13. Naked Rhythm – "Gypsy Majik" (Gypsy Lounge Vocal Remix)
14. Blank & Jones – "Loneliness" (Chill House Mix)
15. Bahramji feat. Mashti – "Indusufi"
16. DJ Ravin feat. Karma Sound Collective – "Karma Busta Rhythm"

=== Buddha Bar X (2008) ===
Mixed by DJ Ravin

- CD 1 (Xiangqi) (70 min: 48 s)
1. Nitin Sawhney feat. the London Symphony Orchestra – "Songbird"
2. Thierry David – "Song of Freedom"
3. Jaime Torres – "El Humahuaqueño"
4. Temple of Sound feat. Natacha Atlas – "City of God"
5. Czech Philharmonic Chamber Orchestra feat. Sophie Solomon – "Love Theme from Ben Hur" (Bombay Dub Orchestra Remix)
6. Samo Zaen – "Tonight"
7. Gaudi + Nusrat Fateh Ali Khan – "Bethe Bethe Kese Kese"
8. Cantoma – "Maja"
9. Van Daler & Low Pressure feat. Natasja Saad – "Real Love"
10. Özgür Sakar a.k.a. Misda Oz vs Mercan Dede – "Ab-i Beka"
11. Waldeck – "Get Up... Carmen"
12. Nikko Patrelakis – "Arco Iris"
13. Ralph Myerz feat. Pee Wee – "My Darling"
14. Bebo Best & the Super Lounge Orchestra – "Life Is on the Sea"
15. The Real Tuesday Weld – "Kix"
16. Pochill – "Violet Theme"
17. Nicolaj Grandjean – "Heroes & Saints"'
- CD 2 (Weiqi) (76 min: 37 s)
1. DJ A feat. Sonia – "Anazitisi (Quest)"'
2. Lulu Rouge – "Bless You"
3. Azam Ali – "Endless Reverie" (Bentey and Smitty Mix)
4. Markus Enochson – "For You to See (w/ Masaya)" (Tiger Stripes Vocal Remix)
5. Kaya Project – "Salaam" (Remix for Irina Mikhailova)
6. Damien Draghici & Emanuele Arnone – "Let Love Go"'
7. Buscemi – "Sahib Balkan"
8. Lanoiraude – "Khen Hook"
9. Pier Bucci – "Hay Consuelo" (Samim Remix)
10. Shantel – "Immigrant Child"
11. Giorgio Giordano – "Amazzonia"
12. Jan Driver – "Kardamoon"
13. Shaman's Dream – "Rakandao"
14. DJ Disse – "Break on Through"
15. Jerry Dimmer – "Flavia"

=== Siddharta, Spirit of Buddha Bar Vol.4: Praha (2008) ===
Mixed by DJ Ravin

1. Jef Stott – "Saracen (Eye of Horus Vocal Mix)"
2. Cheb I Sabbah – "Kinna Sohna"
3. Bardo State – "Mariposa"
4. Buddha Sounds – "14 KMS"
5. Sasha Lazard – "Carnival"
6. Sonantes – "Toque De Coito"
7. Sudestada – "Malevaje"
8. Mlle Caro & Franck Garcia – "Hold Me"
9. Lulu Rouge – "Melankoli"
10. Dousk – "Serenata Deluxe"
11. Carmen Rizzo – "Shadows"
12. A Dog Named Rodriguez – "Every Day Is a Brand New Day (Summer in My Heart Remix)"
13. Le Tone – "Paris-Dheli"
14. Zeb – "Balkany & Flowers"
15. Cantoma – "Only People"
16. Eva Be – "Unite Tonite"

=== Buddha Bar XI (2009) ===
Mixed by DJ Ravin

- CD 1 (Lavяa) (73 min: 30 s)
1. Niyaz – "Iman"
2. The Bombay Dub Orchestra – "Journey"
3. Riccardo Eberspacher – "Setira"
4. Ayoe Angelica – "Dr Jekill"
5. Christos Stylianou feat. Maria Latsinou – "Smell of Roses" (V-Sag Dub Mix)
6. Carlos Campos & DJ Ravin – "Kyiamah"
7. Nitin Sawhney feat. Ojos de Brujo – "Shadowland"
8. Mathieu & Florzinho – "Maha-Amba"
9. Astyplaz – "Zaira"
10. Sarma – "Falling Stars"
11. DJ Disse & Batina Bager feat. Fred Astaire – "Cheek to Cheek"
12. Sunset Blvd – "Loving You"
13. Angel Tears – "Purple Orchid"
14. Woolfy vs Projections – "We Were There"
15. Nina & Chris present Zeep – "Agua"
16. Serafim Tsotsonis – "Small 2"
17. Mlle Caro & Frank Garcia – "Mon Ange"
- CD 2 (Khяeschatik) (76 min: 44 s)
1. Bahramji feat. Mashti – "My Life"
2. DJ A – "Piano Dream"
3. Rucyl – "Love in War" (Pete Gust KID Remix)
4. Asli Güngör & Ferhat Göcer – "Kalp Kalbe Karşı" (Hüseyin Karadayı Remix)
5. Silky Sunday – "Friend" (Sandy Rivera Remix)
6. Glender – "Echoes"
7. Dave Seaman – "Gobbledygook" (Funkagenda Repulse Mix)
8. Riham – "Erja Ya Habebi" (Dj Srulik Einhom Remix)
9. Loreena McKennitt – "Marrakesh Night Market" (V-Sag Remix)
10. DJ Danjer feat. Ash – "My Danjer Sound"
11. De-Tuned – "Sitar"
12. DJ Tatana – "Spring Breeze" (Martin Roth SummerStyle Remix)
13. Sumo feat. Rigas – "Tribute"
14. Taho – "Shambhalla" (WiNK Interpretation)
15. Orkidea and David West – "God's Garden"'

=== Siddharta, Spirit of Buddha Bar Vol.5: Budapest (2009) ===
Mixed by DJ Ravin

1. OMFO – "Caravanserai"
2. Mathieu – "The Indian" (Original Mix)
3. Liquid Stranger – "Lotus"
4. Kaya Project feat. Deeyah – "The Source"
5. Blue Pilots Project – "Mamouth"
6. Lal Meri – "Lal Meri"
7. Bahramji – "Being with Your"
8. Eso Es – "In the Garden"
9. Dj Ipek – "Istanbul Cocuklari"
10. Blank & Jones – "Where You Belong (Poolside House Mix)"
11. Volkan Uça – "Anatolian Sax"
12. Fluxx & Lola – "Romance (Max Moroldo Vs Paul & Luke Reloaded Mix)"
13. Zunda Project – "Sirtaki (Sirtaki Mix)"
14. Shantel – "Binaz in Dub"
15. Parov Stelar – "Your Man"
16. SALM feat. Karl Lagerfeld – "Rondo Parisiano"

=== Buddha Bar XII (2010) ===
Mixed by DJ Ravin

- CD 1 (La vie en rose) (75 min: 22 s)
1. Bliss – "Ouverture"
2. Goya Project – "Lamento" (Sunset Rework)
3. Ambray – "Maya"
4. Shaheen Sheik – "Here We Go" (SoulAvenue Erhu Blues Mix)
5. Cantoma – "Viusu"
6. Caravan Palace – "Ended with the Night"
7. Lal Meri – "Bandhan"
8. Eric Fernandez – "Deliciate"
9. Bahramji & Mashti – "Lovers"
10. Ida Corr feat. Shaggy – "Under the Sun" (Lenny Ibizarre Remix)
11. Sarma – "Remember Me"
12. HP. Hoeger & M. Lackmaier – "El Balle"
13. Ryukyu Underground – "Umaku Kamade"
14. MIDIval Punditz – "Tonic"
15. Blue Pilots Project – "Air Fiction"
16. Goulasch Exotica vs. Lushlife Project – "Keleti Szi"
17. Almadrava – "La vie en rose" (Chill Out Mix)
- CD 2 (Pink Me Up) (78 min: 06 s)
1. DJ Ravin & Carlos Campos – "I Must Confess"
2. Massivan – "4 Generations"
3. Sis N' Jones feat. Isaac – "Jami"
4. Inspiro & Ornella Vanoni – "Perduto" (Inspired Club Mix)
5. Joey Negro presents the Sunburst Band – "Man of War" (Henrik Schwarz Remix)
6. Gönül Yazar – "Özledigim Sevgili"
7. Chaim – "Thrill You"
8. Emilio Fernandez – "Let It Go" (Vocal Mix)
9. Jason Rivas – "Carnivàle" (Club Mix)
10. Mandinga – "Calling Trombonika"
11. Jerome Isma-Ae & Roy Stroebel – "Vila Nova"
12. Tommy Vee & Mauro Ferrucci with CeCe Rogers – "Stay" (Thomas Gold Vocal Mix)
13. Mario Più & Jurgen Cecconi– "Ueno Park 5 A.M."
14. Matt Darey presents Urban Astronauts feat. Kate Louise Smith – "See the Sun" (Aurosonic Remix)
15. Dexi – "Adela"

=== Buddha Bar XIII (2011) ===
Mixed by DJ Ravin and David Visan

- CD 1 (Mystic Quest) (76 min: 10 s)
1. Ravin, Carlos Campos & David Visan – "Homage to Mr. V"
2. Hardage feat. Jenny Bae – "Lamento" (Sunset Rework)
3. SoulAvenue feat. Shaheen Sheik – "One by One" (Original Mix)
4. Triangle Sun feat. Lena Kaufman – "When You Go Forward"
5. Ganga – "Clouds"
6. Hector Zazou, Barbara Eramo & Stefano Saletti – "I Feel Love"
7. Zeebee – "Be My Sailor"
8. Jojo Effect feat Iain Mackenzie – "Mambo Tonight"
9. Papercut – "Sta Synnefa"
10. Alfida – "Allaya Lee" (Original Mix)
11. Jazzamor – "Time Is Running"
12. Nacho Sotomayor – "Timeless"
13. Florzinho – "A La Luna"
14. Nada – "Bamboo Dub"
15. Fuat & Mashti – "Sufisticated"
16. The Spy from Cairo – "Oud Funk"
17. Dunkelbunt feat. Boban i Marko Markovic Orkestar – "Cinnamon Girl" (Radio)
- CD 2 (Secret Bliss) (77 min: 09 s)
1. Laya Project Remix – "Touare" (The Ambergris Remix)
2. Consoul Trainin & Pink Noisy feat. Anastasia Zannis – "Tango to Evora"
3. V-Sag feat. Athina Routsi – "Cancao Do Mar"
4. Blank & Jones with Mystic Diversions – "Quedate" (Blank & Jones Moonshine Mix)
5. DJ Kaan Gokman – "Level Up"
6. Tony Seal – "Danza del Viento" (George Vala & Audioprophecy Remix)
7. MHD – "Arabica"
8. Dimitra Galani – "To S'agapo Borei" (Dimi Phaze Remix)
9. Sean Bay vs. Medhi Mouelhi feat. Arabella – "Maktoub"
10. Parov Stelar – "The Phantom" (1930 Swing Version)
11. Dr. Kucho! – "La Isla" (Original Mix)
12. Jay C & Felix Baumgartne – "Souk" (Original Mix)
13. Caramel Project – "Ya Habibi"
14. Lustral – "Everytime" (Original Mix)
15. Kaya Project – "Sundown"' (EarthRise SoundSystem Remix)

=== Buddha Bar XIV (2012) ===
Mixed by DJ Ravin

- CD 1 (Dhimsa)
1. Thor – "Dari Lullaby"
2. Ravin & Carlos Campos – "Romance in Klotild Palace"
3. PrOmid feat. Omid Mahramzadeh – "Far Away"
4. Ambray – "Brahma"
5. ShiftZ feat. Hiba El Mansouri – "Ahwak"
6. Kohib – "Hear This"
7. SoulAvenue feat. Shaheen Sheik – "Different" (SoulAvenue's Boddhisattva Blues)
8. Cayetano – "Fairytales"
9. Duke B – "The Truth"
10. Eric Fernandez – "Cada Dia"
11. Pravana – "Ulluwatu" (Amanaska Remix)
12. Laar meets Zoohacker – "Tilinko"
13. Paolo Rossini – "Floating to the Sun"
14. Ahilea feat. Bella Wagner – "Devil's Eyes"
15. Ronny Morris – "All About Love" (Ganga Mix)
16. Pierre Ravan & Haldo feat. Parthasarathi Mukherjee & Harshada Jawale – "Nostalgia" (Emotional Lounge Mix)
- CD 2 (Bhangra)
1. 22ROCKETS – "Umma"
2. Rosa Lux feat. Alberte & Josefine Winding – "Min Klub Først"
3. Nora En Pure – "Saltwater"
4. Flo Mrzdk & Juliet Sikora – "Shanti"
5. Nacho Sotomayor – "Return to Mykonos" (PrOmid Remix)
6. Mikael Simpson – "Inden Du Falder I Sovn" (Lulu Rouge Remix)
7. Sugar House feat. Marieke Meijer – "Desire"
8. Vinayak A feat. Dhrithi – "Losing Myself" (Alexey Sonar Remix)
9. Denis Dallan – "Liberta"
10. Consoul Trainin & Pink Noisy – "Litanie des Saints"
11. Rico Bernasconi vs. Sasha Dith – "Bollywood" (Saxo. Club Mix)
12. Alex Barattini – "Let Me Kiss You"
13. Sezer Uysal feat. Chinar – "Baku" (Dinka Remix)
14. Gorins – "I Grieve for Spring"

=== Siddharta, Spirit of Buddha Bar: Dubai (2012) ===
Mixed by DJ Ravin

1. Nitin Sawhney – Daydream
2. Parov Stelar – Milla's Dream
3. Buddha Sounds – Everything You Need (Drum Dub)
4. Haik Solar and Arni Rock – Tango with the Wind
5. Nickodemus – Under the Volcano (José Màrquez Remix)
6. Anthypnic Flow – For You (Nikolas Gale Remix)
7. PrOmid – Deep Love (High & Mighty Remix)
8. Rosa Lux feat. Basim Alansar – Mafish Kedah
9. Pacho & Pepo – Clarinete En Los Balcanes (Original Mix)
10. Sogno Zingaro – Sogno Zingaro (Original Mix)
11. Complexmode & Audioprophecy feat. Martina Govednik – Lovely Flight
12. Mahmut Orhan & Boral Kibil – Fringe
13. Aknael & Bekeela feat. Jane Maximova – Your Love
14. Triangle Sun – Beautiful (Original Version)

=== Buddha Bar XV (2013) ===
Mixed by DJ Ravin

- CD 1
1. Bliss – "Absence of Fear"
2. Dale Cornelius – "Lament N°2" (Thor Tibetan Bell Edit)
3. Dim Vach – "In Love with a Mermaid"
4. Shaheen Sheik – "Lullaby for Samiyah"
5. Bart&Baker feat. Marcella Puppini – "Stop Googling Me!" (ROGAN "Future Soul" Remix)
6. Balkan Fanatik feat. Prophet (Teruo Artistry) and Janga – "Ha Te Tudnád... / Love Gone Wrong"
7. Yasmine Hamdan – "Shouei"
8. Uttara-Kuru – "Neyuki"
9. Thor – "Chamka"
10. Zoe – "Let Me Go"
11. Stan Kolev – "Anandi"
12. Yin and Yang feat. Tiefblau – "Golden Sun"
13. Mihai Toma – "Flutaka"
14. Niyaz – "Mazaar"
15. George Chatzis – "Thracian Vibe"
16. Ganga feat. Helle Chirholm – "The Wind"
17. SoulAvenue – "Padmasundari"
- CD 2
1. D'Jean & Masonaise – "Indian Man of Trouble" (Mashti Edit)
2. Aki Bergen & Pezzner feat. Terry Grant – "Tarareando"
3. Riva Starr feat. Rssll – "Absence" (Original Extended)
4. Rocco – "Saharien Child" (Original Mix)
5. Andrew Richardson feat. Sarina Suno 'the Violin Diva' – "Hashim Theme" (Original Mix)
6. Niconé & Sascha Braemer feat. Narra – "Raoui" (Original Version)
7. HP. Hoeger – "Delhi Oneway"
8. Bevan Godden & Arnaud D – "Ntobenthle" (Momba Mix)
9. Mariza – "Meu Fado Meu" (Nuno Cunha Souldillaz Remix)
10. Fabrice Dayan & Peter Nalitch – "My Guitar"
11. Mikael Delta – "The Last Storm of Words" (Dimi Phaze Remix)
12. Matvey Emerson – "Luna" (Original Mix)
13. Stan Kolev & Dinka feat. Albena Veskova – "Luminal" (Original Vocal Mix)
14. Sean Bay feat. Arabella – "Maktoub 2" (Original Mix)
15. DJ Kaan Gokman – "Bellycious"

=== Buddha Bar XVI (2014) ===
Mixed by DJ Ravin

- CD1 (Charango)
1. Jacob Gurevitsch – "Lovers in Paris (Original Mix)" 4:51
2. Soul Avenue – "Tamazight" 4:26
3. Ambray – "Who We Are" 4:14
4. Thor – "Nowruz" 3:53
5. Ganga – "Carry You Home (Thor & Ravin Rebirth Remix)" 4:18
6. Max Chorny – "Zaprosi U Sni" 4:38
7. Cambis & Florzinho – "Aman Aman" 5:19
8. Sigh – "Medina Blues" 4:05
9. Michael E – "Promise" 5:07
10. Laid Back – "Let the Music Do the Talking" 3:42
11. Akshin Alizadeh – "Deep Inside" 3:31
12. Niyaz – "The Hunt (The Hunt 2013)" 4:12
13. Angel Tears – "Shir" 6:25
14. Stan Kolev & Matan Caspi – "Midnight Caravan" 5:01
15. Nacho Sotomayor – "Opaque (Transparent Remix)" 4:51
16. Dreamers Inc & Makis Ablianitis – "BABA" 6:44
- CD 2 (Bombo)
1. Yasmine Hamdan – "Deny (Holmes Price Remix)" 5:25
2. Parov Stelar Trio – "La Calatrava" 3:40
3. Adham Shaikhs' – "Coupe Decale (Drumspyder Remix)" 6:13
4. Mercan Dede – "Hidden" 4:59
5. Desert Dwellers – "Far from Here (Drumspyder Remix)" 5:24
6. Hinano – "Daer I Pels (Deep Vocal Club Mix)" 3:04
7. Wareika – "La Paloma" 5:29
8. Anthony Romeno feat. Lady Vale – "Play the Guitar" 6:07
9. Rebeat feat. Shirley Bassey – "If You Go Away" 7:05
10. Sable Sheep – "Upon Burning Skies" 6:49
11. Kadebostany – "Walking with a Ghost (Alceen Remix)" 5:37
12. Riva Starr feat. Carmen Consoli – "No Man's Land (Original Mix)" 6:04
13. Serdar Ayyildiz – "Dualis" 5:10
14. Elissa – "Albi Hases Fik (Club Mix by Fadi Bitar)" 5:47

=== Buddha Bar XVII (2015) ===
Mixed by DJ Ravin

- CD1 (Guembri)
1. Mihai Toma feat. Irene – "Ena" 4:15
2. Soapkills – "Marra Fi Ghnina" 4:41
3. Faud Almuqtadir & Armeen Musa – "Bhromor Koio Giya" 5:04
4. Thor – "Sunrise over Ganges" 5:08
5. Soulavenue – "Stronger by Me (Kerala Beach Mix)" 4:29
6. The Ukulele Orchestra of Great Britain & Ibiza Air – "Bang Bang (YuYuMa Chill Out Remix)" 5:39
7. Fakear – "Damas" 4:18
8. Bandish Projekt – "Alchemy" 5:01
9. Bobbi Walker – "Spellbreaker (Deep Chill Deluxe)" 4:14
10. Troels Hammer – "Run King" 4:34
11. The Kenneth Bager Experience – "Stuck in a Lie (Ole Fonken Remix)" 5:29
12. Eccodek – "In Confidence" 4:49
13. Les Au Revoir – "Tha Ksanartheis (Kled Moné Radio Edit)" 4:14
14. Dans & Lær – "Gulbug" 3:25
15. Caravane – "Imout Rih" 5:07
16. Lucci Capri – "Kilimanjaro" 7:14
- CD2 (Bendir)
1. Pattern Drama – "Girar O Mundo" 5:27
2. Oum – "Lik (Mashti & Polyesta Remix for Womex 14)" 5:25
3. Jose Manuel – "Mantra" 5:27
4. I Am Oak – "On Trees and Birds and Fire (Sam Feldt & Bloombox Remix)" 3:49
5. Kiasmos – "Looped" 5:04
6. DJ Ravin feat. Theodosii Spassov – "Sakar Melody (Ravin & Thor Mix)" 6:31
7. Anton Ishutin – "Deeply in My Soul" 7:06
8. Truss Rod – "Run Wild (Deeprock Extended Mix)" 4:50
9. Thor – "Punjab Funk" 5:02
10. SRTW – "We Were Young (Extended Master)" 5:07
11. Alsarah & the Nubatones – "Wad Alnuba (Captain Planet Remix)" 4:31
12. Sara – "Tounkan (Captain Planet Remix)" 5:48
13. Bart&Baker – "What Can I Do for You (Nicola Conte Radio Remix)" 5:29
14. Hot Casandra – "Operatic Female Having a Crack" 5:30
15. Hinano – "Vaerst for Dig (Yasmine Edit)" 3:59

=== Siddharta Lounge by Buddha Bar (2015) ===
Mixed by DJ Ravin & Dimi El

1. Kaya Project – "Firedance"
2. Melina Mercouri – "Agapi Pou 'Gines Dikopo Maher (PaPerCuts Remix)"
3. Papercut (3) feat. Kristin Mainhart – "Adrift (Albert Planck & Solifer Remix)"
4. Khaled Roshdy feat. Roudy (2) – "Piano" (Original Mix)
5. Martina Topley-Bird feat. Warpaint & Mark Lanegan – "Crystalized (Director's Cut Remix)"
6. Jan Blomqvist – "Time Again (Jan Blomqvist Club Mix)"
7. Little D. & Stamy & Nikos Diamontopoulos – "La Revolucion" (Original Mix)
8. Chopstick & Johnjon – "Pining Moon" (Original Mix)
9. Imam Baildi – "Argosvinis Moni"
10. Mihalis Safras – "Interafrica (The Glitz Remix)"
11. Rafael Cancian – "The Shark Jazz"
12. Pablo Fierro – "Sahara (Original Mix)"
13. Rezonate – "Canvas"
14. Ravin & Carlos Campos – "The Siddharta Lounge"

=== Buddha Bar XVIII (2016) ===
Mixed by DJ Ravin and Sam Popat

- CD1 (Chill with Ravin)
1. Ambray – "Azure" 4:27
2. Lena Kaufman – "Blessed Is Who Realized Himself (Thor Deep Trip Vocal)" 3:20
3. Thomas Blondet feat. Carol C – "Un Amor" 4:48
4. 55 Cancri e – "Vaggvisa" 3:58
5. Fondue – "Absolem (Afterlife Mix)" 4:45
6. Dom La Nena – "Menina Dos Olhos Azuis (Piers Faccini Remix)" 2:55
7. Angel Tears & Sagi Ohayon – "Ya Mamma" 5:12
8. Kid Moxie – "Shadow Heart (Hp Hoeger & Rusty Egan Remix)" 5:28
9. Mashti – "Dahraram" 4:14
10. Jacob Gurevitsch – "Tiden Der Forstar" 4:43
11. Bombay Dub Orchestra – "Egypt by Air (Earthrise SoundSystem Remix)" 6:37
12. Eccodek – "The Big Man (Rise Ashen Remix)" 5:01
13. Red Axes – "Sabor (feat. Abrão)" 5:45
14. Second Sky – "Dragon Fly" 3:36
15. Troels Hammer – "Madsi" 5:34
- CD2 (Party with Sam)
1. Dreamers Inc feat. Billy Esteban – "Alladin's Wish" 5:38
2. Andre Rizo feat. Niyaz – "Tamana" 3:58
3. Dole & Kom – "Away" 4:06
4. Sam Popat – "Puga Land (Original Mix)" 3:54
5. Jaceo – "Jolgorio (Original Mix)" 3:54
6. Shaman & Sam Popat – "Karma Kandara" 3:46
7. Fabrice Dayan – "La Maza (Original Mix)" 3:59
8. Andre Rizo feat. Narcia Suciu – "Colindul Cerbui" 4:46
9. Dole & Kom feat. Seth Schwarz – "Fly Bar" 6:08
10. SIS feat. Eduardo Castillo – "Sombra India (Eduardo Castillo Remix)" 5:42
11. Dele Sosimi Afrobeat Orchestra – "Too Much Information (Laolu Remix Edit)" 7:13
12. Dan Marciano – "Unlimited (Original Mix)" 5:09
13. Bernstein & Rivera – "Deep (Wally Lopez Mix)" 5:01
14. Gauthier DM – "Irma" 3:05
15. Rivers – "Soft (Dani Zavera Remix)" 4:51

=== Buddha Bar XIX Monte Carlo (2017) ===
Mixed by DJ Papa

- CD1 (From Monte Carlo)
1. Cambis & Florzinho – "Shaneh (Original Mix)" 5:17
2. Federico Spagnoli – "Indian Fever" 4:27
3. Makis Ablianitis – "Uranos" 4:15
4. Andrea Cardillo – "Sogno d'amor" 3:35
5. DJ Roby Canzian & DJ Papa feat. Mara J Boston – "La Fauvette à Tête Noire" 4:21
6. Soulavenue – "Bombay Blues" 4:49
7. Alfida – "Bez Menya" 3:52
8. Dim Vach – "Hymn to Pure Virgin" 3:21
9. Riccardo Eberspacher feat. Gianna Famulari – "YSL" 5:57
10. Mihai Toma – "Moon Dance" 3:56
11. Ganga – "Hot Winds (Indian Version)" 4:07
12. DJ Khaikhan feat. DJ Papa – "Dhan Dhan" 3:43
13. Amanaska – "The Only Way (BB Remix)" 5:59
14. Voyage Sonore – "La Mente Mente" 3:34
15. Smoma – "Big Nose" 3:47
16. Buscemi – "Chop Choy Boogie" 2:56
17. Christos Stylianou – "Sarah's Dream" 2:50
- CD2 (To Tokyo)
1. Vargo – "Sol 100 (Original Mix)" 4:44
2. The Isfys – "Rana (Original Mix)" 4:04
3. Mashti & Jean von Baden feat. Vitor Gonçalves – "Balkan Buddha" 3:38
4. Nacho Sotomayor – "Destino (Dreamers Inc Remix)" 5:40
5. Dalholt & Langklide feat. Demise Ducha – "Afrique" 5:17
6. Joachim Pastor – "Joda (Worakls Remix)" 4:44
7. Jacob Groening – "Siddhartha" 4:22
8. Marga Sol – "Turkish Delight" 3:35
9. Red Axes – "Sun My Sweet Sun" 3:34
10. Pink Noisy – "Ani Kuni (Dreamers Inc. Remix)" 5:10
11. Andre Rizo feat. Troubadub – "Tuyo" 4:31
12. H&K – "Violi (Original Mix)" 6:43
13. Glass Coffee – "Doors of Pakhwaji" 4:32
14. Volkan Uça – "Love (Serdar Ayyildiz Remix)" 5:30
15. Riva Starr – "Once Upon a Time in Naples" 3:48

=== Buddha Bar XX (2018) ===
Mixed by DJ Ravin and Sam Popat

- CD1
1. Danit – "Naturaleza (Mose Edit)" 6:51
2. Tim Schaufert – "Fallin" 3:17
3. Steen Thottrup feat. Lunamila – "Something to Say" 4:16
4. Lenkkodek – "Raise a Cup of Kindness (Weightless Dub Mix)" 4:33
5. Florzinho feat. Amroota Natu – "We Are One Florzinho" 4:57
6. Sigh – "Geisha Blues" 4:16
7. Coldcut & On-U Sound feat. Hamsika Iyer – "Kajra Mohobbat Wala" 3:32
8. Discoshaman & Lemurian feat. Alvaro Suarez – "All We Want Is to Smile" 7:41
9. Oliver Koletzki – "A Tribe Called Kotori" 4:06
10. Cairo Steps – "Desert Road (Wahba's Moonlight Remix)" 4:56
11. Christian Löffler – "Mare (Robot Koch Remix)" 3:53
12. Al-Pha X – "Dreaming" 4:36
13. Rasi Z – "Cheshmhaye To" 6:11
14. Rodriguez Jr. feat. Liset Alea – "Waste Tomorrow" 5:18
15. Tebra – "Suton" 5:54
16. Lena Kaufman – "Crazy Day (Thor Krasnyi Morning Rain)" 4:04
- CD2
1. Tebra – "Istok" 5:25
2. Rasi Z – "Zamin" 4:52
3. Valeron – "Oasis (Ali Farahani Remix)" 5:06
4. Fulltone – "Samai (Armen Miran Remix)" 5:16
5. Zone+ & Bachir Salloum – "Odin" 5:10
6. Jaaneman – "Dadouk" 4:20
7. Elfenberg – "Gilgamesh (Timboletti Remix)" 6:08
8. Andre Rizo – "Horizont" 5:32
9. The Soul Brothers – "Jabir" 4:09
10. Timujin – "Yamar" 5:28
11. Sam Popat & Alex Scheffer – "Circle Spin" 5:09
12. Alexander Ben – "Bedouin (Rework)" 6:33
13. Kamilo Sanclemente – "Azure" 5:14
14. Moonwalk – "Fatima" 5:38
15. Anii – "Cyganka" 5:27

=== Buddha Bar XXI (2019) ===
Mixed by DJ Ravin and Sam Popat

- CD1 (by Ravin)
1. Endless Melancholy – "One Day You Will Be Free"
2. Troels Hammer feat. Mariana Sadovska – "The Human Tree"
3. Samarana – "Shajni"
4. Philippe Cohen Solal feat. Maïa Barouh & Mariam Tamari – "Shizuka"
5. Jane Maximova – "Novel"
6. Raio – "Agua Pura"
7. Laroz – "Or (Rechela Rorschack Remix)"
8. Tuğçe Kurtiş – "Gözleri Aşka Gülen (Alizarina Remix)"
9. BéTé – "Чума"
10. Jose Solano – "Renaissance"
11. Scott Nice – "Missiku"
12. DJ Lusitano – "Anoitecer"
13. KhaiKhan & Dest – "Mihrap (Vocal Mix)"
14. Dobranotch – "Bayatilar (Zuma Dionys & Dibidabo Remix)"
15. Ravin & Reewa – "Desire"
16. Wassim Younes – "Vesper"
17. Stimming X Lambert – "Trauerweide"
- CD2 (by Sam Popat)
1. Sahalé – "Les Fleurs Du Mal"
2. Derun – "Ates (Dogus Cihan Mix)"
3. Valeron – "Midas (Derun Remix)"
4. Landikhan & Caravaca – "Traversata (Elfenberg Remix)"
5. Sorä & Massam – "Adiyaman" (Original Mix)
6. Stellars – "Gitana"
7. Bakean – "Papua"
8. Raw Main – "Origin's" (Original Mix)
9. Sam Popat, Minoise, Shaman – "Varkala" (Original Mix)
10. Hanna Haïs – "Ya Weldi (Andreas Horvat Remix)"
11. Hollywood Jack & Just @Mi – "Babylon Gypsy" (Original Mix)
12. Moraze – "Jemna"
13. Coated Head – "Dissolve" (Original Mix)
14. Stan Kolev – "Nu Moon"
15. Kintar, Delum – "Sophie" (Original Mix)

=== Buddha Bar XXII (2020) ===
Mixed by DJ Ravin

- CD1
1. Markus Schulz & Haliene – "Ave Maria" (Acoustic Mix)
2. Le Mirage du Maghreb – "The Journey"
3. Paskal & Urban Absolutes feat. Susan – "Close My Eyes"
4. Reewa & Ravin – "Yaaram" (Lounge Mix)
5. Isaac Chambers – "Water & Gold"
6. Yousef Kekhia – "Hal Ard Lamin"
7. Thor – "Bansuri Blues"
8. Turu Anasi – "Buvayte Zdorove"
9. Calm – "Space Is My Place" (Mark Barrott's Re-Imagination to the Sacred Heart Center)
10. Prisma & Martin Boder – "Turbina de Amor"
11. Lambchop – "Crosswords or What This Says About You" (Raven Remix)
12. So Dubbed – "Canggu" (Slow Afternoon)
13. Jose Solano – "Savage"
14. Sam Shure – "Louna"
15. Soul of Zoo & Swa Swally Samburu – "Samburu" (Jose Solano Remix)
16. Pandhora feat. Menna Hussein – "Fatnis Island"
17. Cut Off – "Escuro"
- CD2
1. Wassim Younes – "Afternoon Sun"
2. Christos Fourkis – "Drunk Salome"
3. Hoki – "Miles & Miles"
4. Canu, Ñu & Alejandro Castelli – "Mariposa" (Bedouin Remix)
5. Kino Todo – "Timba"
6. Armen Miran & Hraach – "NowHere"
7. Batu Onat – "Casablanca"
8. The Midnight – "Lost Boy" (A.M.R Remix)
9. Ensaime – "Never Ending Dream"
10. Nohan – "Softly"
11. Bloem – "Into Bloom" (Derun Remix)
12. DJ Phellix & Maryama – "Bar Sabze Neshin"
13. Fabio Aurea feat. Toshi – "Yini"
14. Godes – "Zehava"
15. Juan Soul – "Mtna" (Iñaky Garcia Remix)
16. DSF – "Melodia"

=== Buddha Bar XXIII (2021) ===
Mixed by DJ Ravin

- CD1 (Taiyō)
1. Peter Ries – "Silent Reset"
2. El Búho's – "An Undiscovered Paradise"
3. Farafi & Tulshi – "Song of the Stars"
4. Thor – "Bansuri Bliss"
5. Lara Yang, Sun Ying, Bear Liu – "Liu Shao Qing" (Ravin Remix)
6. Holmes Ives & Devika – "Jab Se Piya" (Bombay Dub Orchestra Remix)
7. Rita Vian, Branko – "Sereia Remix"
8. Fotiz & Socrates – "Memories"
9. Intiche & Siti – "Malam Sapi"
10. Tikki Masala feat. Tetouze & Veda Ram – "World Peace"
11. Dee Montero – "Aria" (Ambient Mix)
12. Fed Conti feat. La Boutique – "Coke & Wine"
13. Starwalk feat. Joanne – "Human Love" (Cill Mix)
14. Neuquén Groove Project – "Vilagomon"
15. Venado feat. Bachan – "Idé Weré Weré"
16. HAEVN – "We Are"
17. Ermite – "Memories"
- CD2 (Tsuki)
1. Hajna feat. Mina Shankha – "Aspetterò" (Oonga Remix)
2. Magupi – "Ayabá Aymoré"
3. Be.lanuit – "Dolce Catharsis"
4. ElPeche Efiro – "Me Deixa Falar"
5. Ashoka – "Hamaira"
6. Derun & Mara Aranda – "Las Bodas"
7. Desert Dwellers – "Traversing the Endless Road" (Alvaro Suarez Remix)
8. Dumbekchi feat. Muhammed Junaid – "Saa-ahh Witgheeb ElShamis"
9. Amine K. Atsou feat. Lemonia – "Felice"
10. Tinik – "Fama" (Original Mix)
11. Red Axes – "Pad Yoga Raga"
12. The Soul Brothers – "Lagrimas Negras"
13. Božo Vrećo – "Saba"
14. Khaaron – "Grietas Del Alma" (Paul2Paul Remix)

=== Buddha Bar XXIV (2022) ===
Mixed by DJ Ravin

- CD1 (SŨRYA)
1. Ten Walls – "You Are Close"
2. Reinhard Vanbergen/Charlotte C – "Daydream"
3. Blooy – "School Is Out"
4. DJ Head – "Karmapa Khenno"
5. Awen – "The Ashes Fall"
6. Eastern Wizard – "Mumbai"
7. Michalis Koumbios/Miltos Pashalidis/ThroDef – "Ston Ourano"
8. Gotama – "Wild Flower"
9. Tropo – "Siente Tu Corazon"
10. TraBBarT – "Prince of Tears"
11. DJ Phellix/Bayza/Sheenubb/Sant(IR) – "Pirhan"
12. Qarcii – "Kartan Modga Shemodgoma"
13. Southern Shores – "Fora"
14. Madd Rod/Magupi – "Memoria"
15. Casha – "Behind the Mountains"
16. STJ – "Eco Ballad"
17. Lakou Mizik/Joseph Ray – "Lamizè Pa Dous"
- CD2 (CANDRAMĀ)
1. Kds & Stabfinger – "Zhara"
2. Igor Gonya – "Star Anise"
3. Gabriel Balky – "Echo Mantra"
4. Akio Nagase – "Saigon Acid"
5. Mt Axel – "Breathe Into Me"
6. Adam Husa/Weam Ismail – "Mirage"
7. Vian Pelez – "Les Parapluies De Cherbourg"
8. Madd Rod/Ravin – "One for the Sun"
9. Ayala – "Hindi Dub"
10. The Soul Brothers – "Anabalina"
11. Ilias Katelanos – "Innocence"
12. Scionis – "Pipe of the Space"
13. Audio J/Fifi Matsho – "Kuda Kwenyu"
14. Kuzey – "Morgenland"

=== Buddha Bar XXV (2023) ===
Mixed by DJ Ravin

- CD1
1. Bénou & Ravin – "Alula Desert"
2. Gotama – "Elsewhere"
3. Hajna and Mina Shankha – "Muocalé"
4. Komorebi – "Chanda"
5. Bahramji & Mashti – "Jodaie Separation"
6. Rodion & Louie Austen – "Estate"
7. Ken Fan – "Shiva"
8. Karma Kind – "Samra Samra"
9. Christos Fourkis – "Everlasting Love"
10. Northern Form – "Flow State (Thoma Remix)"
11. Pepe Link – "Korasoul"
12. Donz – "Qele Lao Sona Shahgeldyan (Radio Edit)"
13. HydeClip – "Maria y el Laurel"
14. Stranger Souma, Nukad – "Ajarif"
- CD2
1. Ken Fan – "Momentum of Love"
2. Karma Kind – "Xeribem"
3. boerd – "Stay"
4. Ghenwa Nemnom – "Story of a Battle"
5. Lego Boy, Beat Ride – "Love is Not My Style (Last Chance Remix by Dimitris Papaspyropoylos)"
6. Iwazuni – "The Forgotten"
7. BokkieUlt – "Nasha"
8. VS Prjct – "Ulysses and the Sirens"
9. Ralph Myerz – "Directions (Radio Edit)"
10. Georg Arnim, VRAE – "Silence"
11. Bastian De Luka – "Thracians"
12. Christian Lepah, Alin Prandea – "Maria's Sentimento (Extended)"
13. Izhevski, Nikola Melnikov – "Esenia"
14. Jessica Brankka – "Too Many Roads (Extended Mix)"
- CD3
1. Luca Guerrieri, Liliana Tamberi – "Maremma amara"
2. Eduardo Mc Gregor – "Tal Vez Sonar (Hole Box & Vite Remix)"
3. Peshta Gora – "Iles Des Los"
4. Ilias Katelanos – "Days of Light"
5. TH Moy – "Aesir"
6. John Junior, Onuc – "Alfama"
7. Robin M, Renata Rosa – "Na Mao [Brilhantina]"
8. Pierre Pierre – "Kodi Csori Briga"
9. ODASOUL – "Mi Mare"
10. Jonathan Rosa – "Sacred Dance (Mass Digital Remix)"
11. Alex Twin, Darko De Jan – "Salga La Luna (Original Mix)"
12. Cubicolor – "Summer & Smoke (Edit)"
13. Sandhog – "Bonifacio"
14. AstroMat – "Seeds"

=== Buddha Bar XXVI (2024) ===
Mixed by DJ Ravin

- CD1
1. TraBBarT – "Aatma"
2. Bajazo – "Look at Your Life"
3. Mashti – "Diversity"
4. Subnesia feat. baun – "Here with You"
5. Equanimous & Marya Stark – "The Blooming"
6. MD Pallavi & Andi Otto – "Velvet Flicker (Bliz Nochi & Emil Jourjou Remix)"
7. Aleceo & Daniil Korolev – "Rechka (Arp Version)"
8. Hawazin – "No Volveré (Remix)"
9. Sauco – "Kohlu"
10. DJ Nick Ross – "Nebtedi El Hikaya"
11. Milu Grutta & Smaâli – "Niya"
12. G combo & Ben & Vincent – "Nada Más"
13. Charlotte & Reinhard – "Sea, Sex & Sun"
14. Buddha Bar & VS Prjct – "A Night in Napoli"
15. Buduchi – "Yaga (Kuumba & Ruben Alegre Remix)"
16. SpaceAgePoetry & Dan Bay – "Van Amsterdam Naar Berlijn (Rui Remix)"
- CD2
1. Sound of Mint & Saint Evo feat. Mbemba Diebaté & Marta Lunares – "Paranima"
2. Abacilar – "Chombacilar (Max Tenrom Remix)"
3. Ismailovic, Nabil Sansi, Mr. ID & Momo Ryuk – "Jit Dhifkom (Mr. ID Remix)"
4. Monsieur Minimal feat. Dakis – "Stigmi (Mysteria Afterlife Dance Remix)"
5. Joezi, Yotam Avni & Shiran Tzfira – "Yumah"
6. Deorbiting feat. Ira Atari – "Wie Du"
7. Ravin feat. Gosha & tomash – "Vira v Peremogu"
8. Omary & Idd Aziz – "Kolowa"
9. Buddha Bar & Jose Solano – "Mala Hierba"
10. Ben Pierre – "Forest of the Cuckoo"
11. Rich Vom Dorf – "In My Dream"
12. Kawtar Sadik feat. Aziz Ozouss – "Ribabohali"
13. Robilardo – "Making Love (Extended Mix)"
14. Animalic Drum & Kreative Natvez feat. James Sakala & Lu Lu (ZM) – "Shalimar (Dr Feel Remix)"
15. Micaele – "Empty Streets (Extended Mix)"

=== Buddha Bar XXVII (2025) ===
Mixed by DJ Ravin

- CD1
1. Eastern Wizard – "Le Baiser Du Sorcier"
2. Orange Blossom – "Alsira"
3. Mashti/Adam Dreisler – "Maine Pyaar Kiy"
4. Gotama – "Twilight Echoes"
5. Fyordh – "Kerala Blues"
6. De-Phazz – "Silence Beyond"
7. Jose Solano – "Sal de Mar"
8. AURAL – "Laulu Mustarastaan"
9. El Beso Del Arbol/Immanuel Gonzalvez – "Chuma"
10. Aldi/Salvador Poletti – "Siento Calma"
11. Tamer Elderini – "Souq"
12. Majnoon – "Hatiralar"
13. Catching Flies – "Tides"
14. Tomasz Guiddo/Jimi Tenor/Louie Austen – "Smile"
15. Nairu – Mariposa Azul – "Damian Pietro"
16. Nato – "Apae"
17. Yaensen/Yacouba Diabate – "Kora Café"
- CD2
1. Rich Vom Dorf – "Heartbroke"
2. Jakhira/Bjorn Salvador – "Ásbyrgi"
3. DeDeXgrande/Aziz Ozouss – "Awiyyid"
4. Xande (IT) – "Imagination"
5. Bufi/Kubebe – "El Jockey-Abrao"
6. Animalic Drum – "Mwendwa"
7. Linear/The Saint – "Samadu"
8. Kiko Navarro/Hugo Navarro – "Una Mattina (with Poem)"
9. KXD Beats/SboshTheVee – "The Calling"
10. Aroma (IND) – "Fight It Off"
11. Simio Albino – "Missing You"
12. Leonidas K. – "Amour Noir"
13. Nohan – "Las Trenzas a New You"
14. The AB Brothers – "AL SAHA"
15. DJ Phellix/Ablozé – "ZAL"

=== Buddha Bar XXVIII (2026) ===
Mixed by DJ Ravin

- CD1
1. Giuliano Rodrigues/Dubwve – "Echoes Flow" (Original Mix)
2. Andy Inchausti/El Remolón/Jazmín Prodan – "Amor De Primavera"
3. Eastern Wizard – "Chant of the Blue Wolf"
4. Berk Öcal – "Artsunkneri Gisher"
5. Nato (Fr) – "Lonely"
6. Momo Ryuk/Ksser Essouq/Funkky – "Ksser Essouk" (Funkky Afro Beldi Remix)
7. Maziri – "Mi Silencio"
8. Desert Raven – "Isfahan" (Adeil Airaki Remix)
9. Majnoon – "Mektep"
10. Isaya Neris – "Grace Kelly"
11. Tamer ElDerini – "Mawlay"
12. Pablo Denuit – "Timon"
13. Idin Gorji/Mahdis Soltani – "Sarv"
14. Lynk Lee – "Bon Gio Hai Muoi" (Nora B Remix)
- CD2
1. Røamr – "Crow"
2. A X L – "Awaly"
3. Ravin/D-Compost – "Champagne After Midnight"
4. Marsey/Chris Bell – "Reload"
5. Adán Dani – "Me Quedo Contigo"
6. Glender – "Canto De Xisto" (Original Mix)
7. The Saint – "Mozanda"
8. Christos Fourkis – "Aegean Myst"
9. Safar/Hind Ennaira – "Janguariye" (Original Mix)
10. Marco Tegui – "Huayna Cocha"
11. Rose Caviar/Merzzy – "Beba" (Extended Mix)
12. LennyTunes – "Mahabula"
13. Earthling/Orrell Williams/Michael Moloi – "Singabant" (Day Mix)
14. Bandish Projekt – "Beyond Ocean" (Remix)
15. Silvana Villanueva – "Bailarín" (Julio Posadas Remix)
