= List of festivals in Turkey =

More than 1000 festivals are held in Turkey every year. Along with festivals of local scale held in almost every city of the country, cultural events and other festivals of international reach are also organized in major metropolitan centers such as Istanbul, Ankara, İzmir and Antalya.

Istanbul is the most important center of festivals. In the summer months, a number of music festivals are held in Istanbul. Many are organized by and associated with prominent names in Turkey's private sector. Every year over 4.000 social dancers from 120 Countries attend to Istanbul Dance Festival (13th Anniversary in 2025) which promises an unforgettable week of dance with performances and workshops led by World-renowned artists from all around the World. The Efes Pilsen Blues Festival, which celebrated its 10th year in 2006, hosts well-known blues and jazz groups. The Akbank International Jazz Festival provides the opportunity of improvisation and jam sessions between Turkish musicians and jazz masters of the world. The Yapı Kredi Art Festival with its concerts ranging from rock and roll and pop music to classical music and jazz is actually a series of events around the year. Fuji Film World Music Days is yet another important music festival.

İzmir is notable for hosting the oldest festival activity in Turkey, within the frame of multi-theme İzmir International Fair held in the first days of September, and organized by İZFAŞ, a depending company of İzmir Metropolitan Municipality. The musical and other cultural events that take place at the same time as the commercial fair had started out as an auxiliary activity to attract popular interest for the fair, but over the years the festival became a school by itself.

Major festivals
Turkish Festival Guide
Istanbul International Dance Festival	Organized annually since 2011 (13th Anniversary in 2025)
International Bodrum Dance Festival	
International Ankara Film Festival	16th
Ankara International Music Festival	
Alanya International Culture and Art Festival	11th
Gümüşlük International Classical Music Festival	Annual since 2004
International Ankara Cartoon Festival	
Bilkent International Theater Meeting (Ankara)	
Bilkent International Anatolia Music Festival (Ankara)	
International Istanbul Film Festival	25th
International Istanbul Theater Festival	
Istanbul Fringe Festival	
Istanbul International Music Festival	
Istanbul International Jazz Festival	12th
International Istanbul Biennial	
Neon International Psychedelic Music & Art Festival	Bursa – July
Barışarock	
Rock'n Coke	
İzmir International Fair	Organized annually since 1927
İzmir European Jazz Festival	Organized annually since 1994
International Izmir Festival	Organized annually since 1987
İzmir Alacati International Child and Youth Theaters Festival	
İzmir Fair International Folk Dances Festival	
Cesme Sea Festivity and International Song Contest (İzmir)	
Nasreddin Hodja Festivities (Konya)	
Mevlana Memorial Celebrations (Konya)	
International Pamukkale Music and Culture Festival (Denizli)	
International Amateur Theaters Festival (Denizli)	
Traditional Manisa Mesir Festival	
Yunus Emre Culture and Art Week (Eskişehir)	
International Eskişehir Festival	11th
International Bursa Festival	
Adıyaman International Commagene Festival	
Traditional Kırkpınar Oil-Wrestling Festivities(Edirne)	
International Hacı Bektaş-i Veli Memorial Celebrations (Nevşehir)	
International Atatürk Dam Water Sports Feast (Şanlıurfa)	
Mersin International Music Festival	
Şanlıurfa International Culture and Art Week	
Antalya Demre International Noel Baba (St. Nicholas) Memorial Celebrations	
Aspendos Opera and Ballet Festival (Antalya)	
Turkish Choral Festival	Annual – since 1996
Alanya International Culture and Art Festival	3–5 October
Robert College Fine Arts Festival (Istanbul)	Organized annually since 1982
Kadirga Festival	Annual
Edirne International Kakava Festival	Annual on May 5
Cappadocia Music Festival	Annual on July
Teknofest Istanbul	September
