= Mo' Horizons =

Duo of DJs from Hanover, Germany

- Origin: Hanover, Germany
- Years active: 1998–present
- Labels: Stereo Deluxe; Agogo Records
- Members: Ralf Droesemeyer; Mark 'Foh' Wetzler
- Website: http://www.myspace.com/mohorizons

Mo' Horizons is a duo of DJs from Hanover, Germany. Their music can be described as a mixture of downtempo, acid-jazz, nu jazz, soul, funk, dub, trip hop, big beat, bossa nova, boogaloo and drum'n'bass. They first came to prominence on various compilation albums, including the Buddha Bar series. They are known for their extensive use of sampling and modern production techniques in Latin jazz. They are also known for recording a Portuguese version of the classic song "Hit the Road Jack".

Their tracks were remixed by many DJs, including Nicola Conte, Swag, Skeewiff, Bobby Hughes, Only Child and DJ Day.

Mo' Horizons were initially signed by the Stereo Deluxe label. After releasing their fourth studio album, Mo' Horizons decided to create their own label, Agogo Records. Apart from releasing their own albums, the label also looks for new talent from around the world, in order to help them with their first releases.

== Discography ==
=== Studio albums ===
- Come Touch The Sun (1999)
- Remember Tomorrow (2001)
- ...And The New Bohemian Freedom (2003)
- Sunshine Today (2007)
- Mo' Horizons and the Banana Soundsystem (2011)
- The Banana Remixes (2015)
- Music Sun Love (2019)
- Mango (2023)

=== Singles ===
- Yes Baby Yes (1999)
- Hit The Road Jack (2000)
- Ay Y N' Ama (2007)
- Lovely Day Inside EP (2008)

=== Compilations ===
- Some More Horizons (2005)
- Ten Years Of... (2008)

=== Appearances on compilations ===
- Buddha Bar, Volume 7
- Putamayo Presents:
  - Asian Groove
  - Cover the World
- hôtel costes, sept
