= Angel Tears (duo) =

Israeli musical duo

- Origin: Tel Aviv, Israel
- Genres: World fusion; electronica; new age
- Years active: 1998–present
- Labels: MP Master Production; LoveCat Music
- Members: Momi Ochion; Sebastian James Taylor

Angel Tears is a musical duo formed in 1998 and based in Tel Aviv, Israel. It is composed of Sebastian Taylor and Momi Ochion. Their music ranges from world fusion to electronica and new age. As of 2025, they have released five studio albums.

== Background ==
Formed in 1998, Angel Tears consists of Momi Ochion (Israel) and Sebastian Taylor (UK). Ochion's musical roots lie in Israeli pop and world fusion music, and Taylor is also involved with the electronic groups Kaya Project, Shakta, and Digitalis. The duo's music is a fusion of world, electronica, and new age, and they often incorporate instruments from a mix of cultures, such as the goblet drum, Tibetan flute, ney, sitar, violin, piano, and guitar. They also include various Asian, African, and Middle Eastern vocals in their compositions.

The duo have tracks on a number of global fusion compilations, including Buddha Bar II, Buddha Bar VIII, Lotus Lounge, Barramundi, and Mana Medicine. Their music can also heard on popular TV shows, including Sex and the City, The Sopranos, Third Watch, and The West Wing.

== Discography ==
- Way of the Mystic, Vol. 1 (1998)
- Harmony, Vol. 2 (2001)
- The Dreaming, Vol. 3 (2002)
- Vision, Vol. 4 (2004)
- Love, Vol. 5 (2008)
