= Claude Challe =

French DJ and club owner (born 1945)

Claude Challe (born Claude Chalom in 1945 in Tunisia) is a French DJ and club owner, the co-creator of the Buddha Bar restaurant/clubs and music compilations.

== Background ==
Challe moved to France at age three. He attended Rabbinical school as a young man. At the age of 19, he opened a hair salon in Paris, and became known as "the man with the golden scissors".

Challe then abandoned the salon and lived as an expatriate on the island of Sardinia, in a hippie commune. He subsequently traveled to India, Nepal and Indonesia. He uses Buddha statues for the interior design of his bar and restaurant.

Challe returned to France and was introduced to new-age music by the likes of Andreas Vollenweider and Ennio Morricone. He became involved in Parisian nightlife. He managed a series of French clubs, including Le Prive (1974), Le Centre Ville in Les Halles (1979), Les Bains Douches (1984), El Divino in Ibiza (1992), and Buddha Bar (1996). The restaurant/club became a popular destination and led to Challe's Buddha Bar mix compilations.

Challe produced the "Reveillon de Mondes", attended by 50,000 people, and held at Vincennes, in conjunction with Radio Nova.

Challe produces his music and others' on his Chall'o Music label. He has said, "I consider the art of DJing to be the passion of [my] life. When I'm DJing, I give myself to the people. When I play, I'm in the music."
