= Nora En Pure =

Swiss-South African DJ and music producer

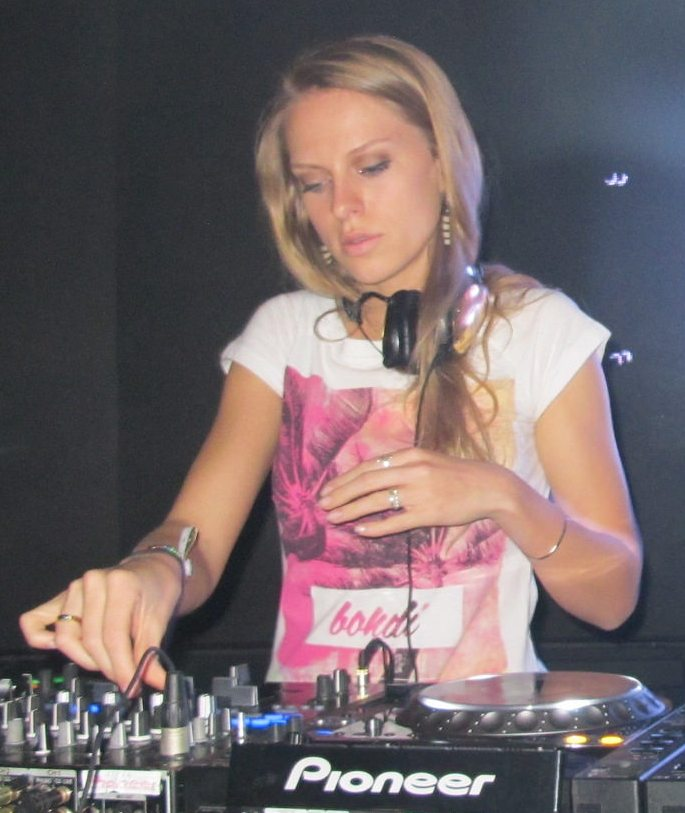
- Nora en Pure performing in Singapore, May 2016.

Background information
- Born: Daniela Di Lillo; 20 July 1990 (age 36); Johannesburg, South Africa
- Occupations: DJ; record producer; musician
- Years active: 2001–present
- Website: noraenpure.com
- Musical career
- Genres: Deep house; indie dance; tech house; Progressive house
- Instruments: DAW; flute; drums; piano
- Labels: Purified Records; Spinnin'; Enormous Tunes; Tokenish

Daniela Di Lillo (formerly Niederer, born 20 July 1990), better known by her stage name Nora En Pure, is a Swiss-South African DJ and deep house producer. She first received recognition for her 2013 single "Come With Me". Further popular releases are "Morning Dew", "Lake Arrowhead", and "Tears In Your Eyes." In July 2016, she was invited to put together a two-hour long mix for Pete Tong's radio show: "BBC's Essential Mix".

== Biography ==
=== Early life ===
Born to a South African mother and a Swiss father in Johannesburg, Di Lillo migrated to Switzerland during her infancy. Raised in a musical environment, she has learned to play musical instruments since childhood.

Before engaging in the electronic music scene, she used to listen to other musical genres including classical music, pop and rock.

=== Background ===
Being an outdoors enthusiast, Nora En Pure finds creative inspiration in nature and travels resulting in organic and nature-infused productions and sets. Weaving her influences of South African roots with the love for classical music and soundtracks, tracks often paint a certain scenery combining tribal percussion with traditional Western instrumentation, creating emotional melodies and harmonies with piano, strings, wind instruments and synthesizers.

Being part of the Helvetic Nerds in Switzerland, Nora En Pure has a year-long studio and label partnership with Enormous Tunes label owner Christian Hirt. Nora En Pure was one of the first artists of melodic and organic deep house sound when the genre gained popularity.

=== Musical career ===
Her first steps into the global scene she started with the single "Saltwater" which contains elements of "True" by Spandau Ballet, and was included in the 2012 compilation by Buddha Bar. In 2013 the success of "Come With Me" followed, which remained in the Top 100 of Beatport's download list for more than seven months.

She gained international recognition by touring, with appearances at Coachella Festival on the Yuma stage (which hosts the best artists of deep house and techno music), at the Tomorrowland "Daybreak Session" (a 3-hour set on the mainstage of alongside Joris Voorn, Carl Cox and others), or with a whole catalogue of EPs and remixes (for artists such as Faithless, Wretch 32, Klingande, Oliver Heldens, Paul Harris and his side project Dirty Vegas).

Nora plays the deep house radio show "Purified Radio" on Sirius XM Chill satellite radio every Saturday at 10pm. On Mondays the episodes get uploaded to iTunes, SoundCloud and YouTube. This radio show received a nomination for Best Radio/Podcast in the 2019 IDMA Award. In April 2024 the 400th episode was released.

In 2017, she released an extended play titled Conquer Yosemite.

In 2020, she ranked 73rd place in DJ Mag's top 100 worldwide DJs. In 2021 she ranked 59th on the same listing. In 2022 she ranked 57th, and in 2023 she ranked 53rd (6th among female DJs). In 2024 she ranked 65th, and in 2025 she ranked 58th.

Nora En Pure was part of the lineup for the 22nd Coachella Valley Music and Arts Festival in April 2023. In 2024, she was part of the lineup for Tomorrowland festival, where she has featured several times.

== Awards and nominations ==
=== International Dance Music Awards ===
Year	Category	Nominee / Work	Result	Ref.
2019	Best House Artist (Female)	Nora En Pure	Won	
2020	Best House Artist (Female)	Nora En Pure	Won	
