= Neon International Psychedelic Music & Art Festival =

Biennial music festival

Neon Festival
- Genre: Psychedelic trance, chill-out music, reggae, psybient, Goa trance, ambient, electronica
- Dates: 28.05.2022
- Location: Turkey / Bursa - Alacam
- Years active: 2014 - present
- Founders: Neonista's (past: FC Organization)
- Website: neonfestival.net

Neon Festival is a biennial music festival held in Turkey. The festival began in the 4th biggest city of Turkey, called Bursa in 2015.

== History ==
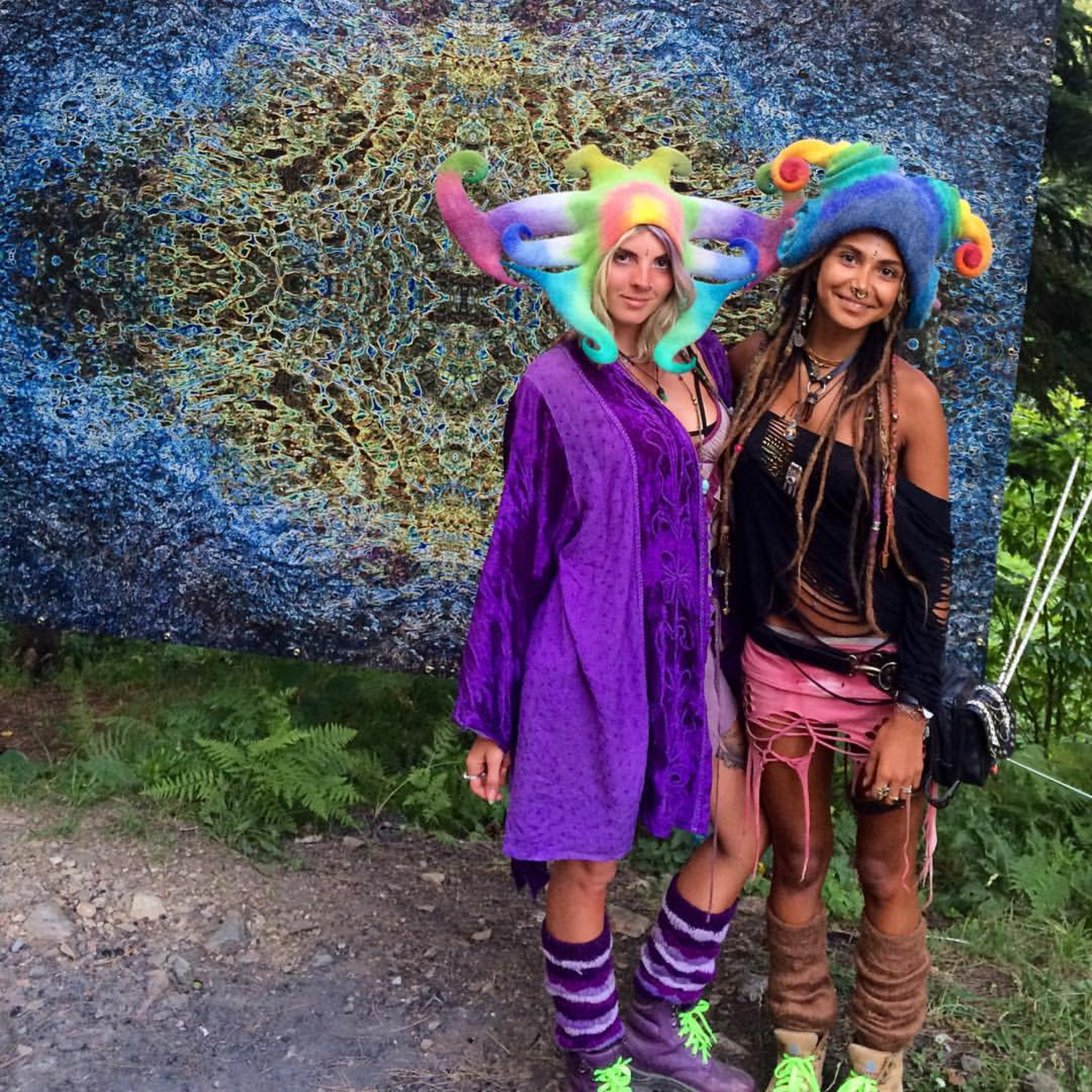
Neon Festival 2015

=== 2015 ===
The first edition of the festival took place on 13th of July to 19th of July in Alacam / Bursa. Inside of a magical forest with thousands of attendees

=== 2021 ===
Postponed to 2022 - The second edition of the festival will take place in Lifepark, Istanbul on 3rd of July 2021. It's a one-day festival with 18 hrs. performances.

=== 2022 ===
The second edition is a one day festival in Lifepark, Sariyer - Istanbul on 28 of May 2021.

== Overview / Stages ==
Neon Festival features a number of international psychedelic music acts from genres including psytrance, dark psy, Goa trance, full-on, forest, chill-out, psybient, ambient and reggae. There are two stages; Main Stage and Chill/Reggae Stage.

== Recycle and Sustainability / Stages ==
Neon Festival is also called a transformational festival, as almost every stage and art piece of the festival has been created by recycled products. Neon doesn't work with sponsor or any entertainment companies.

== Events and Installations ==
- 3D Sound System
- 4D Dance Floor
- Art Gallery
- Yoga and Healing Area
- Main Stage & Chill-Reggae Stage
- Attractions, Games and Water activities

== Decor, Sound and Stage Design ==
Fully designed atelier has been produced by Neon Festival design team, led by stage masters and artists. Funktion-One Sound System has been used in 2014 edition.

== Arts and Galleries / Artists ==
- Alex Grey
- Allyson Grey

=== Editions Summary ===
| Year | No. Visitors | Date | Headliners | Theme |
|---|---|---|---|---|
| 2015 | 3,500 | 13 July to 19 July | Ace Ventura, Captain Hook, Liquid Soul, Perfect Stranger, Loud, Kalya Scintilla, MerKaBa, Aphid Moon, Aliji, Kashyyyk, DigiCult, Kaya Project, E-Mantra, Earthling, ATMA, Boom Shankar, Justin Chaos, Suduaya, Shakta, Digitalis, Hibernation, Tristan, Animato, Avalon, Goasia, Killerwatts, Nirmal, Opsy, Sorian, Kanc Cover, Nick Sentience, Nikki S, Kukan Dub Lagan, Kukan Reggae, Reasonandu | —N/a |
| 2021 | | 03 July | Ace Ventura, Juno Reactor, Undercover, Freedom Fighters, Electic, Aslandj, | Fictional Universe |
| 2022 | | 28 May | Ace Ventura, Juno Reactor, Gaudi, Aslandj, TBA | Fictional Stage |

== See also ==
- List of electronic music festivals
- Boom Festival
- Ozora Festival
