= Bahramji =

Kurdish Iranian musician

Bahram Pourmand (بهرام پورمند), better known by his stage name Bahramji (born 1952 in Kermanshah) is a Kurdish New Age musician from Iran.

== Life ==
As a child he heard the old Sufi melodies, which now form the source of inspiration for his music. At the age of 13, he learned to play the Persian string instrument the santur and soon began to perform several shows in his home town. In 1977 he left Iran, traveled to India for study, and later emigrated to Europe. After few years, he decided to continue his journey in North America so he left Europe.

After his life and creative work in India, where he stayed for a long time, he discovered the island of Ibiza in Spain in 2003. There he met many other musicians, DJs and producers who inspired him to expand his style.

== Music style ==
By making music for hikers from different cultures, he has changed his style, which has been influenced by the traditional Persian music, and has thus found his own style. Particular to his music is that he pours old songs into a new form and through this fusion creates a meditative, musical era.

Bahram's instrument is the Persian santoor, a traditional stringed instrument of which it is said it could create the sound of emptiness. Besides the santoor, he began playing the Persian setar and the ney, a Persian bamboo flute. Soon afterwards, he began to sing to his music, which had hitherto been instrumental in character: he often quotes the poems and wisdom of mystical poets such as Rumi.

His music is a special combination between the old and the traditional, a fusion of Rumi's spiritual poems with modern and technical rhythms that invite to meditation. The fusion between spirituality and meditative rhythms, combined with traditional Persian instruments such as the santoor, has a hypnotic effect.

== Discography ==
- 1997: Sama
- 2004: Call of the Mystic (feat. Maneesh de Moor), Blue Flame Records
- 2007: Master & Disciple (feat. Bashir), Blue Flame Records
- 2007: Sufi Safir (feat. Mashti), Blue Flame Records
- 2009: Sufiyan (feat. Mashti), Blue Flame Records
- 2011: Divaneh (feat. Mashti), Blue Flame Records
- 2012: Celestial Doorways (feat. Swann), Blue Flame Records
- 2013: Inner Ji
- 2017: Four Dimensions
- 2018: Ambrosiah, Blue Flame Records
- 2019: Open Spirit, Blue Flame Records
- 2022: Mojoud
