= Christian Löffler =

German electronic musician

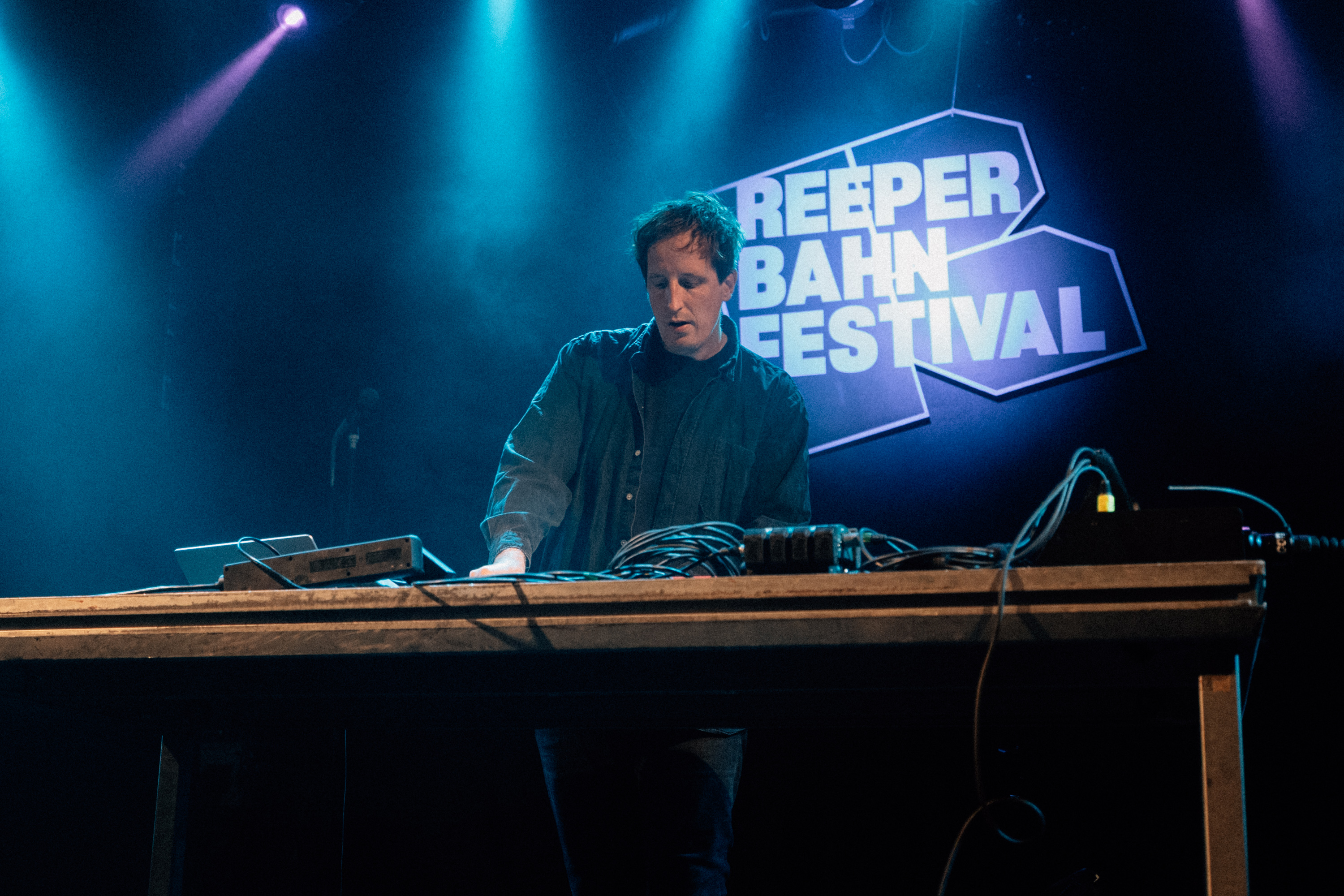
- Löffler performing in 2023

Background information
- Born: Greifswald, East Germany
- Genre: Electronic
- Occupation: Musician
- Years active: 2008-present

Christian Löffler (born in Greifswald) is a German musician who plays a mix of techno, deep house, ambient, and electronic. As of 2026, he has released six studio albums.

== Biography ==
Löffler was born in Greifswald, in the former East Germany, and he lives in Graal-Müritz, Mecklenburg-Vorpommern.

== Music ==
In his youth, Löffler began working on music and had his first performances in the Greifswald area. He started recording ambient sounds and noises from nature (known as field recordings), which he then processed on a drum machine. In 2009, he founded the music label Ki Records.

=== A Forest (2012) and Mare (2016) ===
For the work on his debut album A Forest, released in 2012, Löffler retreated to Usedom for three months. The album features collaborations with various vocalists; the song Swift Code also includes a collaboration with writer Marcus Roloff.

In 2016, Löffler released his second album, Mare, which contains 17 tracks. In addition to various collaborations, including four tracks with vocalist Mohna, Löffler also recorded his own vocals for the album. Mare was recorded on the Darß peninsula.

=== Graal (2019) and Lys (2020) ===
In April 2019, Christian Löffler initially released his third album Graal (Prologue), followed in March 2020 by his fourth album Lys. On Lys (Danish for "light"), Löffler collaborated with singers Josephine Philip and Mona Steinwidder, the latter of whom also frequently performs as a singer at Löffler's live shows. With Lys, Löffler entered the German album charts for the first time.

=== Parallels: Shellac Reworks (2021) and A Life (2024) ===
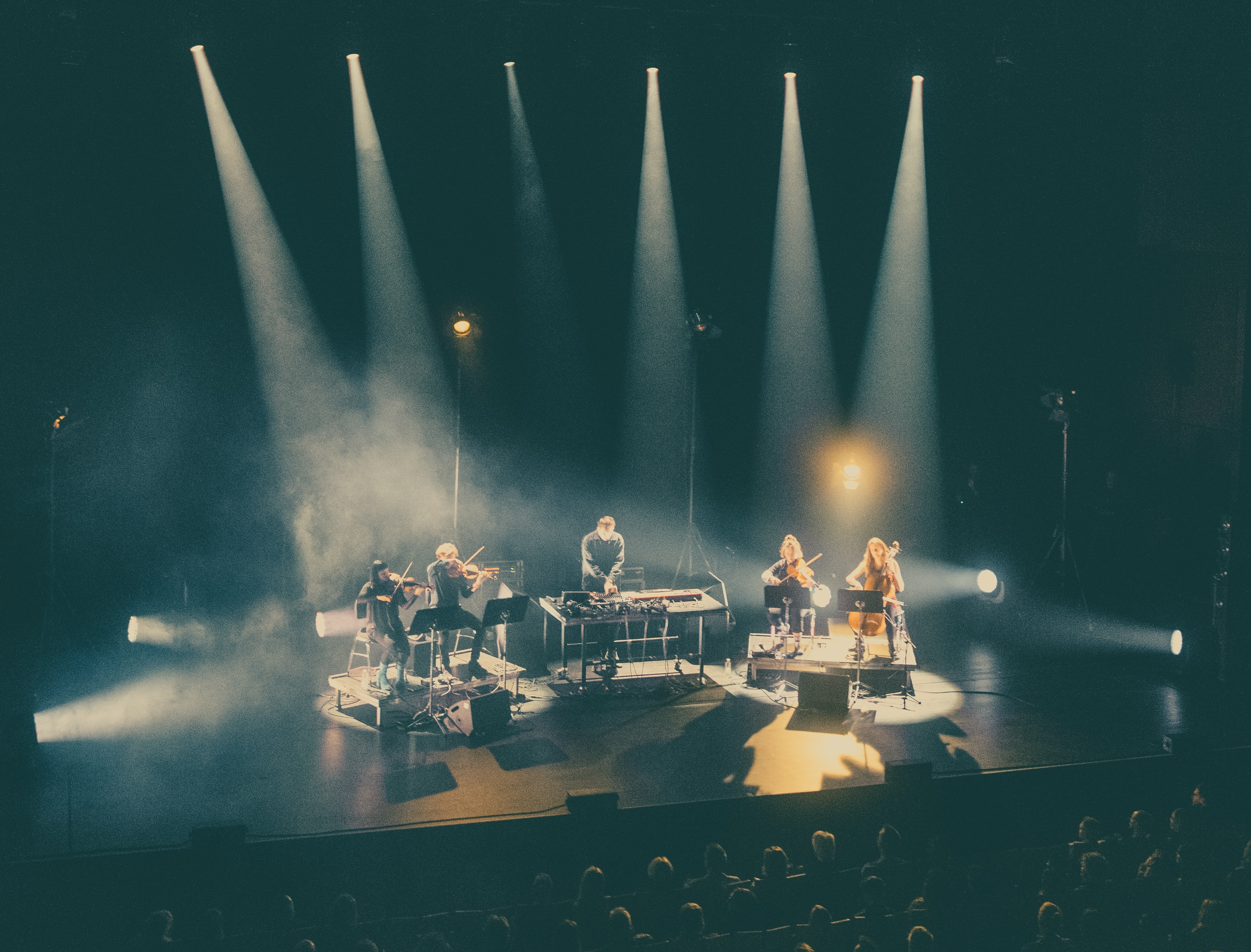
Christian Löffler performing with Detect Ensemble

Löffler's subsequent album Parallels: Shellac Reworks, 2021, was created during the COVID-19 pandemic, when he was unable to perform live. German classical music label Deutsche Grammophon offered Löffler access to shellac records from the label's archive to reinterpret the music works of the Baroque, Classical, and Romantic periods in his own style. The album, released by Deutsche Grammophon, includes adaptations of works by Beethoven, Bach, Wagner, Chopin, Smetana, and Bizet.

In 2022, Löffler performed Parallels at the BBC After Dark Festival at The Sage Gateshead with the Royal Northern Sinfonia chamber orchestra.

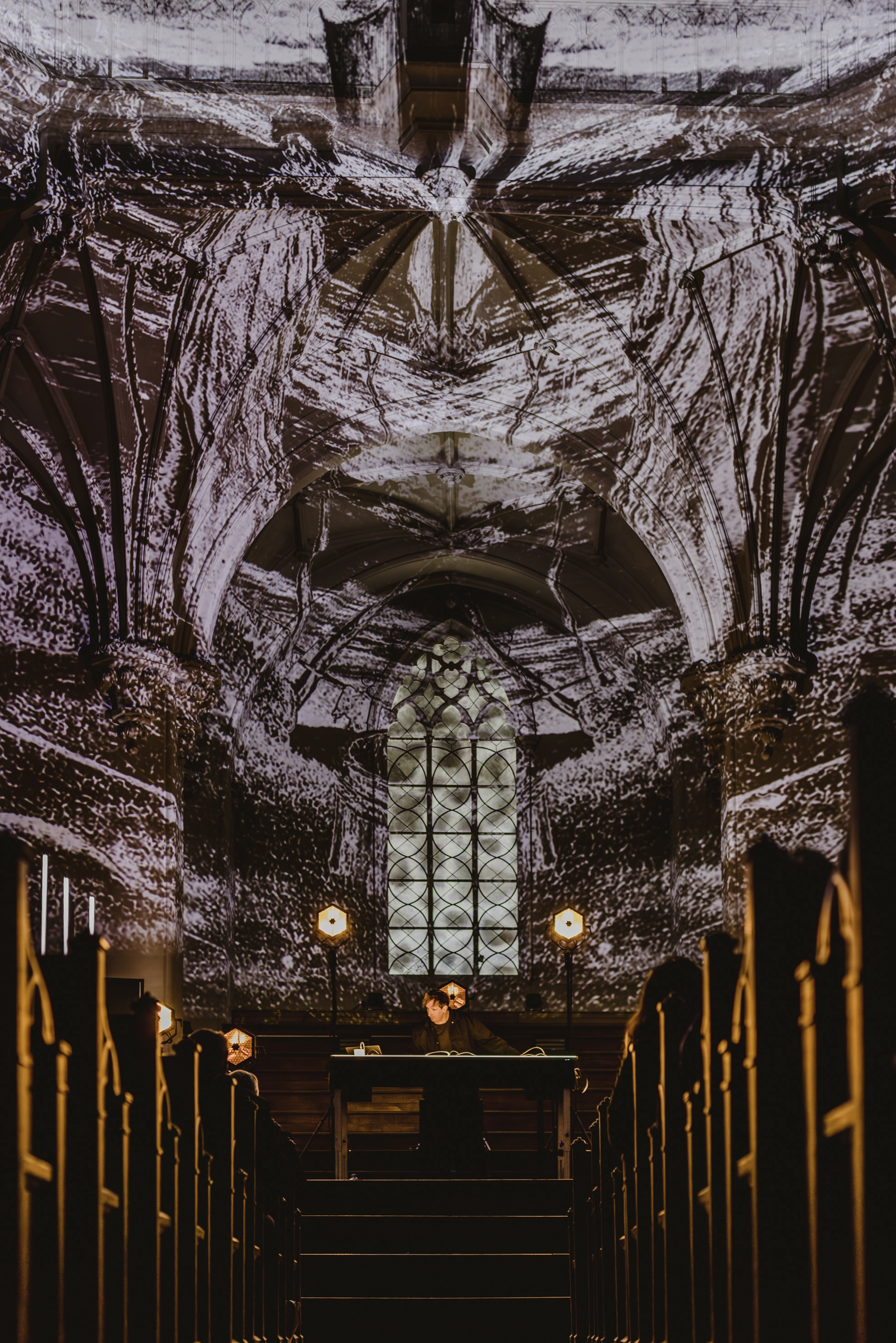
Christian Löffler performing at the opening of "Caspar David Friedrich Year" in the Greifswald St. Nikolai Church

In April 2024, Löffler released his sixth album, A Life. On the album, he collaborated with guest singers Malou and Mogli.

=== Live performance ===
Löffler tours for over three months per year, performing his compositions. He has a global audience and has previously performed in Europe, the United States, and Japan.

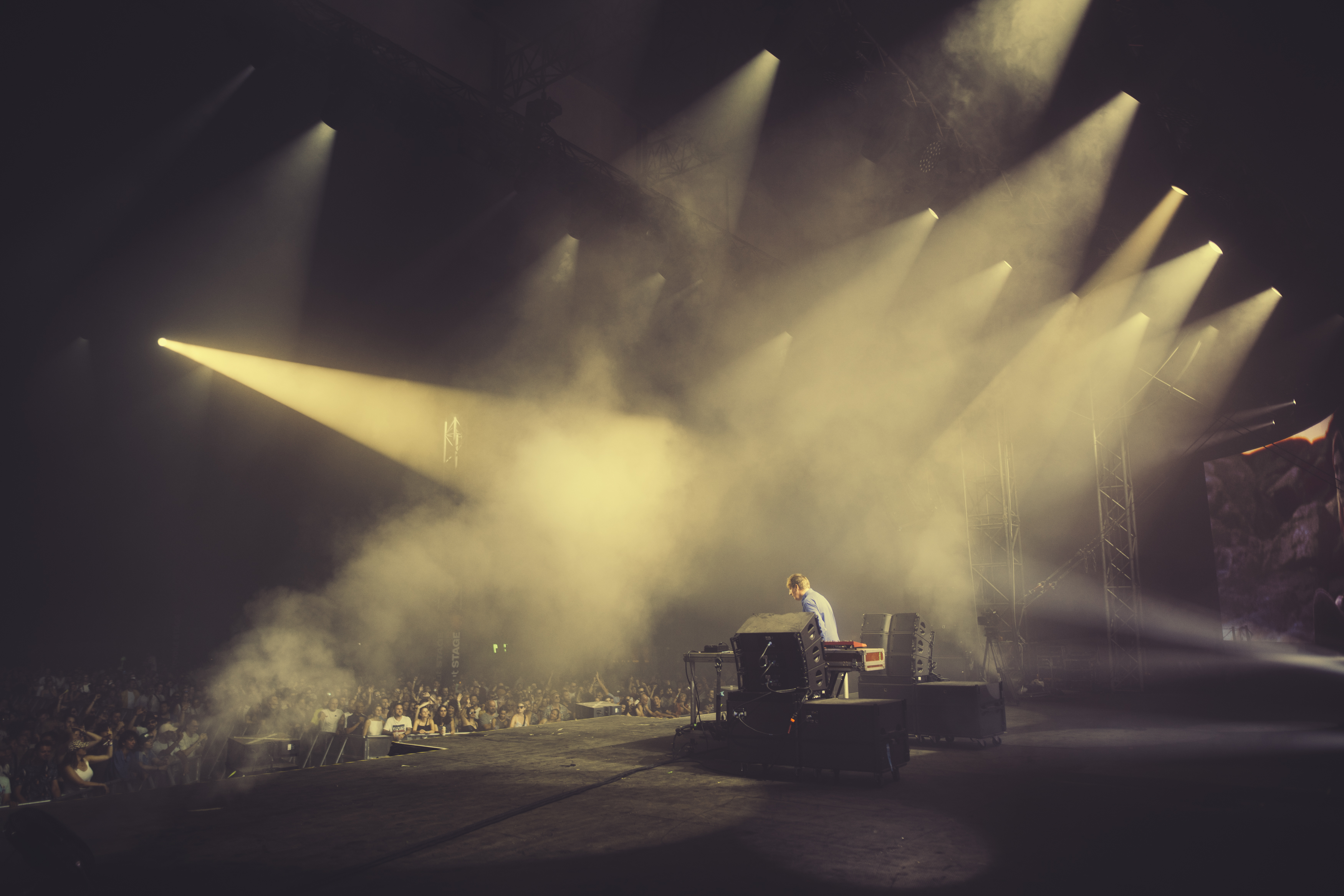
Christian Löffler live at Sziget Festival in Budapest 2024

== Reception ==
Philip Fassing wrote in the former German music magazine Intro that A Forest brings "the old liaison between kick drum and rustling leaves to the point without pretense" (Intro 203, 06/2012). Musikexpress compared Löffler's music to that of Erik Satie.

"Instead of making pop for the club, Christian Löffler from Greifswald does exactly the opposite. He programs house tracks that could be declared as—largely instrumental—introspective pop. [...] House as a backdrop for contemplation and introspection is also possible, as shown by Hamburg musicians Lawrence or Pantha du Prince before Löffler. 'A Forest,' which shares its title with an early hit by the band The Cure, is already a classic of contemplative house." – Tim Caspar Boehme, Der Spiegel

Dirk Domin of ByteFM noted in 2016 on the release of Mare, Löffler manages repeatedly to "combine techno, pop, melancholy, and exuberance under one hat." Laut.de describes in their artist portrait that Löffler's music "oscillates between ambient and dancefloor, yet always carries a strong melancholic impact."

Faze Magazine writes in their Records of the Month column for May 2024, Löffler positions himself with his album A Life "very consciously and clearly against the technical possibilities of AI and for human creativity as something profound and unique." The titles are "moody, expressive" and "a statement that music is much more than just a product."

AllMusic's Liam Martin describes Löffler's works as "emotionally charged, melancholic music that feels isolated yet strangely appealing."

== Discography ==
Title	Album details	Peak chart position
Title	Album details	GER
A Forest	2012, Ki Records	–
Mare	2016, Ki Records	–
Graal (Prologue)	2019, Ki Records	–
Lys	2020, Ki Records	89
Parallels: Shellac Reworks	2021, Deutsche Grammophon/Universal Music	78
A Life	2024, Ki Records	–
Until We Meet Again	2026, Ki Records	–

=== Singles and EPs ===
- 2008: A Hundred Lights (Orphanear)
- 2009: Heights (Ki Records)
- 2010: Raise (c.sides)
- 2011: Baltic Sea (feat. Steffen Kirchhoff; Ki Records)
- 2012: Aspen (Ki Records)
- 2014: All Comes (Ki Records)
- 2014: Young Alaska (Ki Records)
- 2015: York (20:20 Vision)
- 2015: Lost (Just This)
- 2016: Wilderness (feat. Mohna; Ki Records)
- 2016: Licht (Ki Records)
- 2016: Reubin (Ki Records)
- 2017: Haul (feat. Mohna; Ki Records)
- 2017: Haul (feat. Blackout Problems; Ki Records)
- 2019: Graal (Prologue) [Remixes] (Ki Records)
- 2020: Ronda (Cercle Records)
- 2022: Solo (Ki Records)
- 2022: Fjäll (feat. Fejká; Ki Records)
- 2022: New Fires (feat. Henry Green; Ki Records)
- 2023: Envy (feat. Mogli; Ki Records)
- 2023: Brave (Ki Records)
- 2023: Roused (feat. Malou; Ki Records)
- 2024: Ease (Ki Records)
- 2024: Portals (feat. Mogli; Ki Records)
- 2024: When Everything Was New (Ki Records)
- 2024: Felt (feat. Henry Green, Ki Records)
