= Jazzamor =

German music-artist duo

- Origin: Germany
- Genres: Lounge music
- Years active: 2002–present
- Labels: Blue Flame Records
- Members: Bettina Steingass (née Bettina Mischke); Roland Grosch
- Website: Official site

Jazzamor is a German musical duo which consists of vocalist Bettina Steingass (née Bettina Mischke) and keyboardist/producer Roland Grosch. Their music combines elements of lounge music, nu jazz and bossa nova.

== Discography ==
=== Albums ===
- Lazy Sunday Afternoon (2003 · Blue Flame Records)
- A Piece of my Heart (2004 · Blue Flame Records)
- Travel... (2006 · Blue Flame Records)
- Beautiful Day (2007 · Blue Flame Records)
- Selection – Songs for a Beautiful Day (2008 · Blue Flame Records/Rough Trade)
- Lucent Touch (2011 · Blue Flame Records/Rough Trade)
- Strange to be in Paradise (2017 · Blue Flame Records)
- Songs of a Silent Summer (2020 · Blue Flame Records)
