= Christian Rønn =

Danish musician

- Also known as: Ganga
- Born: 23 May 1969 (age 56)
- Origin: Denmark
- Genres: electronic, freeform, industrial rock, ambient drone, Filmmusic
- Occupations: Composer, Performer, music producer, Songwriter,
- Instruments: keys, electronics, guitars
- Years active: 1998–present
- Labels: Escho, Flinc Music, Wormland White, Kid Recordings
- Website: www.christianronn.dk, www.soundcloud.com/flincmusic,www.ganga.dk

Christian Rønn (born 23 May 1969 in Denmark) is a Danish musician and composer of electronic music, industrial rock, ambient drone, free form, film music and experimental music in general. As a soloist and in collaborations, Rønn has worked and played with a number of artists. F.ex. Peter Peter, Ikue Mori, Rhyse Chatham, Peter Peter, Ingrid Chavez, Karsten Vogel and many others.

Since 1998, he has scored more than 24 feature films and documentaries, and performed live scores to silent films like Metropolis and The Battleship Potemkin, the latter with Peter Peter (Peter Schneidermann). These were well received by the Danish press., and the new scores were performed 5 times in all on the Danish music festival Roskilde Festival. As a solo-artist, he has released "Time Charged Maneuvers", "Broken Air" (Insula Records, Flinc Music) and "Chordis et Machina" (Resipiscent Records, Nische, Tonometer), the latter with Ikue Mori.

His less experimental electronic music is primarily written under his moniker Ganga with tracks featured in more than 200 compilations worldwide. As "Ganga", he has released 7 CD albums, 4 EPs and 3 12" LPs. Other notable projects are Prox with Jørgen Teller, Blind Mans Band with Claus Poulsen and Panser with Peter Schneiderman.

== Discography ==
(On Insula Records) as Christian Rønn

- 2015: Time Charged Maneuvers (LP)
- 2016: Broken Air (LP)

( Insula Jazz)

- 2016: Blind Mans band (Christian Rønn, Claus Poulsen, Kevin Angboly) (Tape)
- 2017: Reveal (Claus Poulsen, Christian Rønn, Jenny Gräf) (Tape)

(Escho Records)

As Panser (Christian Rønn & Peter Peter)

- 2012: The Body & The Work a Sacred Unity (LP)(DIG)

( Flinc Music )

As Prox (Jørgen Teller and Christian Rønn)

- 2008: Evil Babies (DIG)
- 2010: On Off (DIG)
- 2014: Life of X (LP)(DIG)

As Ganga

- 2006: I Dream About Trees (CD)(DIG)
- 2009: More Light Please (DIG)
- 2009: Don't Wake Me Up (CD)(DIG)
- 2010: Gaia (CD)(DIG)
- 2011: Circle (CD)(DIG)
- 2012: Forget Gravity (LP)(CD)(DIG)
- 2015: Reptile Routine (DIG)

As Petrol (Christian Rønn, Helle Chirholm and Steen Kyed)

- 2008: Petrol (EP)(DIG)

( Wormland White)

- 2013: Wondrous Machine (CD)(DIG)

=== Film scores ===
(selective)

- 2000: State of Bliss
- 2002: Allahs børn
- 2003: Efterskoleliv - 300 dage på Samsø
- 2004: Hingitaq - de fordrevne
- 2005: Metropolis
- 2006: Battleship Potemkin
- 2007: Bronenosetj Potemkin (original in 1925)
- 2008: Så himmelsk anderledes
- 2011: Fortællingen om Rosa
- 2016: Xenia - en vognmands bekendelser
