= Rubin Steiner =

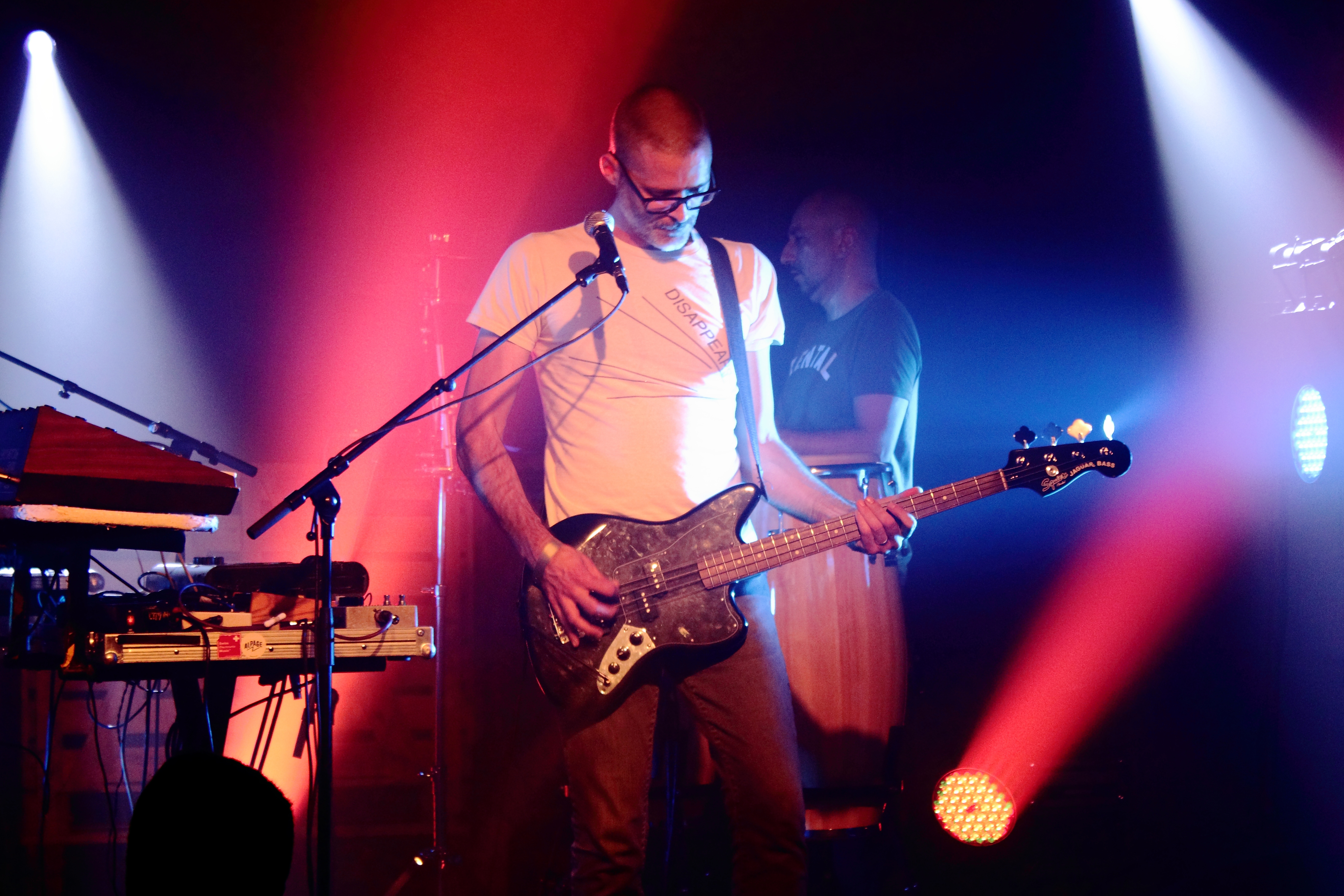
- Steiner performing in 2014

Background information
- Born: Frédérick Landier; 30 October 1974 (age 51); Tours, France
- Genre: Electronic music
- Occupations: Musician, DJ, radio presenter
- Instruments: Guitar, bass, keyboard
- Years active: 1997–present
- Website: www.rubinsteiner.com

Rubin Steiner (born Frédérick Landier, Tours, 30 October 1974) is a French guitar, bass, and keyboard musician, and disc jockey specialising in electronica.

He worked as a radio presenter between 1992 and 2002 for Radio béton in Tours, with a programme of free jazz, electro, punk, and experimental music.

He organized concerts in Tours, edited a music fanzine, and was a guitarist in the group Merz from 1996 to 1998.

His main influences are jazz, hip hop, punk rock, 1980s American music and pop, which he arranges into albums of electro-jazz, electronica, krautrock, pop, punk disco, post-punk, house music, and techno.

He was nominated for the Victoires de la musique in 2006 for his album Drum Major.

== Chronology ==
1999–2000 A bootleg sampler with Placido (of de Loo & Placido), then concerts with Placido, Boulez Republic, Horn Pusher, Volvo Traxx, and Francois Pirault under the name of Dance Hall Music Show.

2000–2001: Going solo with samplers and synthesizer, with videos by VJ François Pirault.

2001–2003: Samples, guitar, and singing in a quartet with Sylvestre Perrusson (bass), Benoit Louette (trombone), and François Pirault as VJ.

2003–2008: Played guitar, samples, synthesizer, and singing in a new quartet, Rubin Steiner Neue Band, with Boogers (drums), Olivier Claveau (guitar, trumpet, trombone), and Sylvestre Perrusson (bass).

2008–2009: Formed Neue Band with Lionel Laquerrière of Nestor Is Bianca, replacing Sylvestre Perrusson on bass.

2009: Recorded an album with the post-punk group The Finkielkrauts (released 2010 on Another Records [sic]).

2010: Made an old school hip hop album with Canadian rapper Ira Lee. Their title "Gay & Proud" was used as the official song of Gay Pride 2011 in Tours.

2010: Participated in Nublu Orchestra performance Conduction N°190, Tête-à-Tête, conducted by Butch Morris.

Since 2010 he has played with Olivier Claveau, Lionel Laquerrière, and Yann Dupeux in Rubin Steiner & The Simple Machines, using only analog synthesizers and rhythm boxes.

He has also continued as the programme planner of Le Temps Machine, playing in Tours.

== Discography ==
=== Albums ===
- 1998 – Lo-fi nu jazz (autoprod)
- 2000 – Lo-fi nu jazz vol.2 (Platinum records)
- 2001 – Lo-fi nu jazz vol.2 + remixes (Platinum records)
- 2002 – Wunderbar drei (Platinum records)
- 2003 – Test recordings (Platinum records)
- 2005 – Drum Major (Platinum records)
- 2008 – Weird hits, two covers & a love song (Platinum records)
- 2009 – More weird hits (Platinum records)
- 2010 – Play With The Tapes #1 (Platinum records)
- 2011 – We are the future (Platinum records) (With IRA Lee)
- 2012 – Discipline In Anarchy (Platinum records)

=== Remixes ===
- 2001 – Inséparable mais by Arthur H
- 2001 – Chépa by Ivan Hio
- 2001 – Le disco chinois by Julien Ribot
- 2001 – Donkey Racing by Mr Neveux
- 2001 – Satellite by Bosco
- 2002 – ? by Nestor Is Bianca
- 2002 – Les Poupons / B.O. by François de Roubaix
- 2004 – ? by Bless
- 2004 – You/You by Boogers
- 2005 – Oscar De La Hoya by Capt'ain K.Verne
- 2006 – Move by Dillinger Girl & Baby Face Nelson
- 2007 – 7 tracks by Bikini Machine
- 2009 – Target by Fortune
- 2010 – Push It To The Limit by Bosco, remix by The Motherbeepers (Rubin Steiner, Ira Lee & Funken)
- 2010 – Eagles don't Sparkle by We Are Enfant Terrible
- 2010 – Brothers & Sisters by Unison
- 2010 – I'm not John Mc Entire by Kid Francescoli
- 2012 – Eagles don't Sparkle by We Are Enfant Terrible
- 2012 – Future Echo by The Oscillation
- 2012 – Cum Operated by Jerri

=== Maxis and EPs ===
- 1999 – Easy Tune ep (UHS)
- 2001 – Midi Jazz 7" (Platinum records)
- 2001 – New Bossa 7" (Platinum records)
- 2001 – Tango 7" (Platinum records)
- 2002 – Guitarlandia Remixes remix by Bosco, Mr Neveux, Up, Bustel & Out, Dj Vadim, TTC, Mr Quark (Platinum records)
- 2003 – Test Recordings vol.1 (Platinum records)
- 2005 – Your life is like a Tony Conrad Concert (Platinum records)
- 2008 – Take Your Time (Platinum records)
- 2012 – Dexter (Platinum records)

=== Other ===
- 2002 – Camping Car for Camping Car - Rubin Steiner & Mme Douze (Travaux publics)
- 2004 – Oumupo 3 with Luz (Ici, d'ailleurs...)
- Compilations on the Travaux publics label
