= Oliver Shanti =

German New-age musician (born 1948)

- Born: Ulrich Schulz; 16 November 1948
- Origin: Hamburg, Germany
- Genre: New-age
- Occupation: Music producer
- Years active: 1987–2016
- Label: Sattva Music
- Member of: Inkarnation; Oliver Shanti & Friends

Oliver Shanti (born 16 November 1948), also known as Oliver Serano-Alve, is a German New-age musician best known for his work with the bands Inkarnation and Oliver Shanti & Friends.

== Discography ==
Main:

- 1987 – Licht-Prakash-Light (as Inkarnation)
- 1987 – Frieden-Shanti-Peace (as Inkarnation)
- 1987 – Listening to the Heart
- 1988 – Rainbow Way
- 1988 – Vila Nova Mellow Days (as Oliver Serano-Alve)
- 1989 – Walking on the Sun
- 1990 – Minho Valley Fantasies (as Oliver Serano-Alve)
- 1992 – Vida para Vida (as Oliver Serano-Alve)
- 1993 – Soft Motion Vol.1 (as Oliver Serano-Alve)
- 1993 – Tai Chi
- 1995 – Well Balanced
- 1996 – Tai Chi Too
- 1997 – Circles of Life: The Best of Oliver Shanti & Friends (compilation album including three new tracks)
- 1998 – Seven Times Seven
- 2000 – Medicine Power
- 2002 – Alhambra
- 2006 – Man Heaven Earth (compilation album featuring two tracks by Existence and Dahmani)

Projects:

- 1996 – Buddha and Bonsai Vol. 1
- 1997 – Shaman
- 2000 – Buddha and Bonsai Vol. 3
- 2000 – Shaman 2

Thematical compilations:

- Indiens: Sacred Spirits
- Shaman: Red Indian Chill
- 1997 – Spirit of Budo: The Power of Balance
- 1997 – 10 Years of Sattva Music
- 1998 – Meditative Music of Budo-Gala: The Magic of Martial Arts
- 1999 – Tibetiya (including 3 new tracks by Oliver Shanti)
- 2001 – 15 Years of Sattva Music
- 2001 – Reiki: Brightness Healing

Other:

- 2008 single – Oliver Shanti feat. N.i.M.i – Roo Be Asemoon (Olugu Zamba Remix)
- 2010 single – Oliver Shanti feat. DJ Sunf – The Tree (rmx)

== Conviction for child sexual abuse ==
In 2002, a warrant for Shanti's arrest was issued in Germany, with a €3000 reward offered, on suspicion of his having committed child sexual abuse. Shanti went missing at that time, and was reported to be living secretly in Germany or its neighbouring countries. He was arrested in Lisbon, Portugal, on 29 June 2008, and charged with 314 cases of child abuse on 20 April 2009. Shanti attempted suicide during his pre-trial custody. He was then sentenced to six years and ten months in prison on Friday, 4 December 2009—after a Munich court convicted him of 76 counts of child sexual abuse.

The remainder of Oliver Shanti & Friends continued performing and recording as Existence, with another Inkarnation co-founder, Margot Reisinger, replacing Shanti.
