= V-Sag =

Greek record producer and DJ

V-Sag Vasileios Nektarios Sagonas
- Βασίλειος Νεκτάριος Σαγώνας
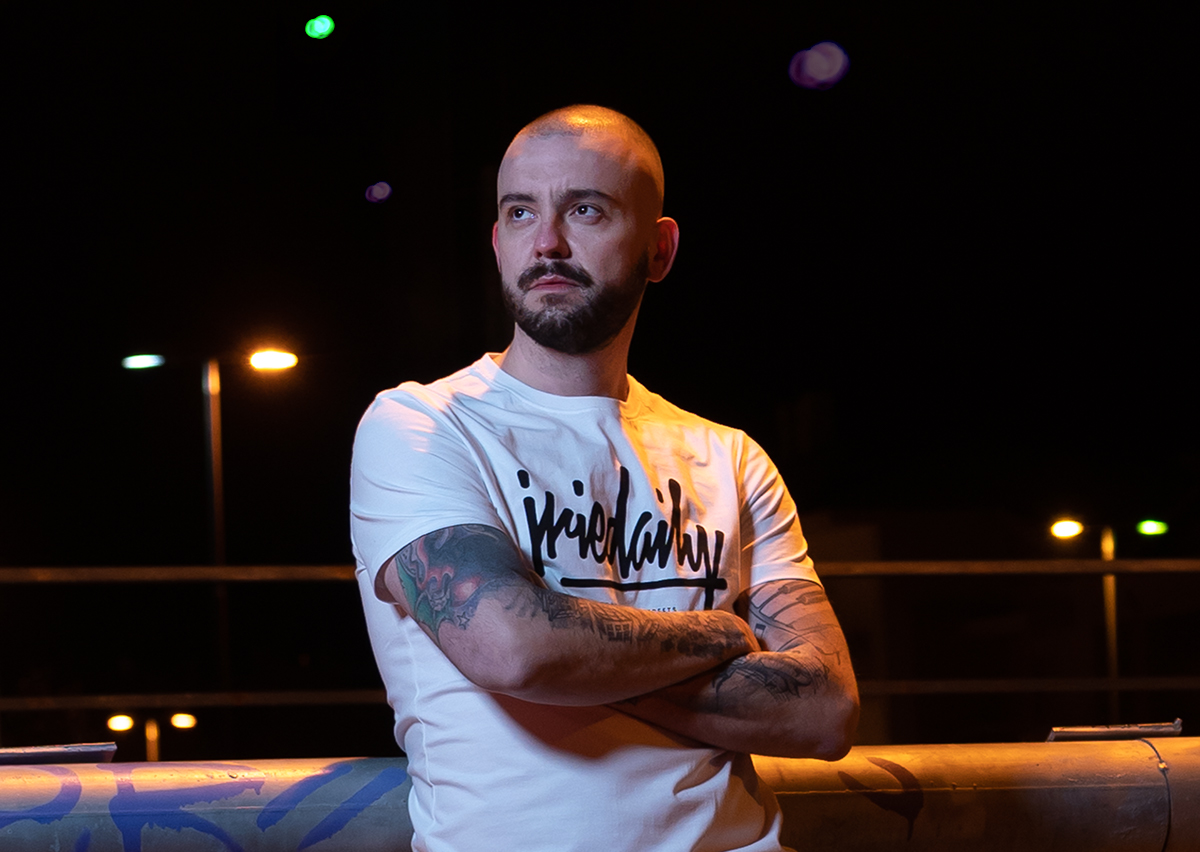
- V-Sag at Larissa, 2021
- Born: 28 January 1983 (age 43); Larissa, Greece
- Notable work: Feather (2008), Lonely (2017)
- Style: Electronica, Progressive House, Downtempo
- Website: www.v-sag.com

Vasileios Nektarios Sagonas (Greek: Βασίλειος Νεκτάριος Σαγώνας; born 28 January 1983) known professionally as V-Sag is a Greek music producer, pianist, DJ and music teacher.

== Early life ==
Sagonas learned how to use computers at an early age, and learned to compose music using Digital Audio Workstations. He came out as gay to his friends and family on his early teens and as a shy person he started expressing his feelings through music.

== Career ==
In 2006, Sagonas released a single Fossil at Pure Substance record label and started touring around the world. The same year, Hernan Cattaneo picked Sagonas' single I Wasn't Impressed Enough as one of his favorites which was released on Dave Seaman's record label, Audio Therapy (record label). In 2008, he collaborated with the record labels Armada Music, EMI and Universal and gained significance success with his release Feather. In the same year he composed the titles music of the soundtrack of the movie Alter Ego starring the Greek singer Sakis Rouvas. Quinlan Road, the record label of the singer Loreena Mckennitt signed V-Sag and released his remix of the song Marrakesh Nigh Market. He then recreated a version of I Totally Miss You of the 80s band Bad Boys Blue and included it on his album Feather with the official license of their label Universal Music Group. He composed the albums Heartfeels, Out Of My Way and Emotions.

In 2013 he performed live at Athens Concert Hall with Alexandra McKay and in 2017 with his release Lonely, gained attention of the Greek music industry, which was included as soundtrack at MEGA Channel Cinema prime advertisement spot and trended #1 on Greek Shazam and YouTube.

As of 2021, V-Sag collaborated with Shaya (singer) and has released 8 albums by The Sound Of Everything UK in collaboration with The Orchard and Sony Music. His latest album Offline has been characterised as innovating by being the first Dolby Atmos production that has been composed by a Greek music producer.

== Discography ==
Studio Albums
| Year | Title | Record label |
|---|---|---|
| 2006 | Fantasy Era | The Sound Of Everything UK |
| 2007 | Shakesperean Love | The Sound Of Everything UK |
| 2008 | Feather | The Sound Of Everything UK |
| 2010 | Heartfeels | The Sound Of Everything UK |
| 2013 | Out Of My Way | The Sound Of Everything UK |
| 2014 | Emotions | The Sound Of Everything UK |
| 2021 | Honestly I'm Dreaming | The Sound Of Everything UK |
| 2022 | Offline | The Sound Of Everything UK |

Singles
| Year | Title | Record label |
|---|---|---|
| 2006 | Fossil | Pure Substance Records |
| 2006 | A Morning After | Swift Records |
| 2006 | Thespian | Vapour Recordings |
| 2006 | I Wasn't Impressed Enough feat. Ilias T | Audiotherapy |
| 2008 | Feather feat. Alexandra McKay | The Sound Of Everything, Universal |
| 2008 | Remember Us (as Motehra) | Armada Music |
| 2010 | Sea Through (in collaboration with DJ Tarkan) | No Smoking Recordings |
| 2016 | Paragalo (in collaboration with DJ Tarkan) | No Smoking Recordings |
| 2017 | Lonely feat. Alexandra McKay | Zero10 Records |
| 2021 | Stranger (in collaboration with Shaya) | Swift Records |
| 2021 | Gravity (in collaboration with Shaya) | The Sound Of Everything UK |
| 2021 | 10.000 Whispers At Night | The Sound Of Everything UK |
| 2021 | Sea Waves | The Sound Of Everything UK |
| 2021 | We Are The Same (in collaboration with Shaya) | The Sound Of Everything UK |
| 2021 | Freak (in collaboration with Shaya) | The Sound Of Everything UK |
