= Kaya Project =

British electronic music project

- Origin: United Kingdom
- Genres: World fusion; electronic
- Years active: 2004–present
- Labels: Interchill Records
- Members: Sebastian James Taylor; Natasha Chamberlain

Kaya Project is a British electronic music project launched by Sebastian James Taylor (Angel Tears, Shakta, Digitalis, Hibernation) in the early 2000s, upon meeting Kazakh singer Irina Mikhailova, who subsequently sang on the debut Kaya Project album, Walking Through, published in 2004, as well as numerous subsequent releases. The second Kaya Project album, Elixir, features contributions from Turkish musician Omer Faruk Tekbilek and British Indian dhol drummer Johnny Kalsi. In 2010, the English singer Shahin Badar sang on the Kaya Project track "Ummah Oum", from the fourth album, Desert Phase. Tekbilek returned to sing on the 2016 Kaya Project track "Crossing the River", with a remix by Anglo-Italian musician Gaudi.

Kaya Project is signed to the Canadian record label Interchill, and his music has appeared on several editions of the Buddha Bar compilation albums, including Buddha Bar X (2008), Siddharta, Spirit of Buddha Bar Vol.5: Budapest (2009), Buddha Bar XIII (2011), and Siddharta Lounge by Buddha Bar (2015).

== Discography ==
Studio albums

- Walking Through (2004)
- Elixir (2005)
- ...& So It Goes (2008)
- Desert Phase (2010)
- Firedance (2014)
- Up from the Dust (2018)
- Body.Mind.Soul (2020)
- Defiance (2022)
- Back to Light Kaya Project, Lorenzo, and Squazoid (2022)
- Transforming Sorrow (2024)

EPs

- Seed EP (2020)
- Zheng '21 EP (2021)
- The Ghasi Ram Blues EP (2021)

Compilations

- KP01: Selected Guitar Works (2020)
- KP02: The Heavy Hitters (2020)
- KP03: Four to the Floor (2021)
- KP04: Featuring Irina Mikhailova (2021)
- KP05: Featuring Randolph Matthews (2021)
- KP06: The Drum and Bass Files (2024)

Remix albums

- Desert Phase Remixes (2010)
- Ummah Oum Remixes EP (feat. Shahin Badar) (2010)
- The Elixir Remixes (2013)
- The Ambient Mixes (2014)
- Firedance Remixes (EP, 2014)
- So It Was (...& So It Goes Remixed) (2016)
- Digital Archives Vol. 2 (2017)
- The Dust Remixes, Pt. 1 (2018)
- The Dust Remixes, Pt. 2 (2018)
- Ambient Mixes 2 (2019)
- Remixed: Body Mind Soul Pt. 1 (2020)
- Souls Entwined (ft. Pooja Tiwari) (EP, 2020)
- Defiance Remix EP Vol. 1 (EP, 2022)
- Ambient Mixes 3 (2023)
- Remixes Blue (2024)
- Remixes Red (2024)
- Remixes Green (2025)
- Remixes: Rust (2025)
