= List of Café del Mar compilations =

List of Café del Mar compilations are albums released by Café del Mar Music and other labels.

== Main Series ==
Volumes 1–6 compiled by Jose Padilla

=== Volume 1 (Volumen Uno) ===
Café del Mar: Volumen Uno

Compilation album by José Padilla
- Released: 1994
- Genre: Ambient music
- Length: 76:35
- Label: React

Café del Mar chronology
Café del Mar: Volumen Uno (1994)	Volumen 2 (Dos) (1995)

1994

#	Track	Time	Artist
1	"Agua"	7:39	José Padilla
2	"The Story of Light"	6:17	William Orbit (Strange Cargo)
3	"Smokebelch II" (Beatless mix)	4:17	The Sabres of Paradise
4	"Music for a Found Harmonium"	2:58	Penguin Cafe Orchestra
5	"Sundance"	4:28	Sun Electric
6	"Fanfare of Life"	6:07	Leftfield
7	"The Hypnotist"	9:01	Sisterlove
8	"Second Hand" (the packaging says "Featuring exclusive Underworld track")	9:01	Underworld
9	"Crazy Ivan"	6:35	Ver Vlads
10	"Estelle"	6:48	A Man Called Adam
11	"On The Rocks"	6:25	Obiman
12	"Sunset At The Café Del Mar"	6:53	Tabula Rasa

=== Volume 2 (Volumen Dos) ===
Café del Mar: Volumen Dos

Compilation album by José Padilla
- Released: 1995
- Genre: Ambient Music
- Length: 1:18:52
- Label: React

Café del Mar chronology
Volumen 1 (Uno) (1994)	Café del Mar: Volumen Dos (1995)	Volumen 3 (Tres) (1996)

1995

#	Track	Time	Artist
1	"Moment Scale"(Dubmaster X remix)	6:08	Silent Poets
2	"Tarenah" (Chill mix)	6:22	Psychedelic Research Lab
3	"D'Votion"	7:03	D*Note
4	"Easter Song"	8:05	A Man Called Adam with Eddie Parker
5	"Entre Dos Aguas"	6:01	Paco de Lucía
6	"Unity"	6:07	Marc Antoine
7	"Sabor de Verano" (The Way Out West Mix)	6:29	José Padilla
8	"Sargasso Sea"	7:18	Salt Tank
9	"(The Making of...) Jill"	4:42	Mark's & Henry's
10	"Everybody Loves the Sunshine"	3:36	R.A.M.P.
11	"Feel Good"	5:30	Deadbeats
12	"Blinky Blue Eyed Sunrise"	6:15	The Metaluna Mutant
13	"Haunted Dancehall"	5:46	The Sabres of Paradise

=== Volume 3 (Volumen Tres) ===
Café del Mar: Volumen Tres

Compilation album by José Padilla
- Released: 1996
- Genre: Ambient Music
- Length: 78:02
- Label: React

Café del Mar chronology
Volumen 2 (Dos) (1995)	Café del Mar: Volumen Tres (1996)	Volumen 4 (Cuatro) (1997)

1996

#	Track	Time	Artist
1	"Walking on Air"	6:11	José Padilla
2	"Tones"	6:16	Nova Nova
3	"Sueno Con Mexico"	5:54	Pat Metheny
4	"Blue Bar"	6:47	Afterlife
5	"Emotions Of Paradise"	7:56	Miro
6	"Nights Interlude"	3:25	Nightmares On Wax
7	"Panama Bazaar"	6:40	Eighth Wave
8	"Dusk"	5:42	Pressure Drop
9	"Asia"	5:23	Alex Neri
10	"Redemption Song"	6:38	Moodswings
11	"Dust Of Life"	7:16	Fazed Idjuts feat. Sally Rodgers
12	"My Freedom"	6:07	Beat Foundation
13	"Last Picture Show"	3:47	Heavyshift

=== Volume 4 (Volumen Cuatro) ===
1997

#	Track	Time	Artist
1	"Que Bonito"	5:57	José Padilla
2	"Sunshines Better" (Talvin Singh mix)	5:48	John Martyn
3	"Leo Leo"	4:47	Indo-Aminata
4	"Grillos"	5:14	Paco Fernandez
5	"Return Journey"	6:12	Voices of Kwahn A.D.
6	"Miracle Road"	6:54	Les Jumeaux
7	"No Sant" (Flytronix mix)	4:56	Wasis Diop feat. Lena Fiagbe
8	"Out of Time"	4:34	Levitation
9	"Place de la Concorde"	5:49	Fila Brazillia
10	"Offshore" (ambient mix)	7:01	Chicane
11	"5th & Avenida"	5:18	Afterlife
12	"Troubled Girl" (Spanish version)	4:19	Karin Ramirez
13	"Lula"	6:27	Phil Mison
14	"Street Tattoo"	5:18	Stan Getz

=== Volume 5 (Volumen Cinco) ===
1998

#	Track	Time	Artist
1	"Mumbai Theme Tune"	5:15	A. R. Rahman
2	"More Than Ever People"	7:21	Levitation
3	"Appreciation" (radio mix)	3:48	Jelly & Fish
4	"Paradise" (Tease mix)	5:01	Nookie feat. Larry Heard
5	"Penelope" (radio edit)	6:12	4 Wings
6	"Tout Est Bleu" (original Ame Strong A.A. remix)	3:44	Ame Strong
7	"Uschi's Groove"	3:25	The Ballistic Brothers
8	"Lubumba '98"	4:56	A New Funky Generation feat. Marika
9	"Face à la Mer" (Massive Attack remix – full version)	5:41	Les Négresses Vertes
10	"Talking with Myself '98" (Canny remix)	7:04	Electribe 101
11	"Pojo Pojo"	5:05	Cyberfit
12	"Transfatty Acid" (Kruder & Dorfmeister remix edit)	6:46	Lamb
13	"Angels Landing" (José Padilla & Sunchild remix)	5:36	Salt Tank
14	"Mani"	5:17	Paco Fernández
15	"Close Cover"	3:13	Wim Mertens

=== Volume 6 (Volumen Seis) ===
1999

1. Talvin Singh – "Traveller" (Kid Loco's Once upon a Time in the East mix) – 5:51
2. Afterlife feat. Rachel Lloyd – "Dub in Ya Mind" (beach club mix) – 5:14
3. A New Funky Generation – "The Messenger" – 3:48
4. dZihan & Kamien – "Homebase" – 7:15
5. Mandalay – "Beautiful" (7" Canny mix) – 4:34
6. Humate – "3.2 Bedrock" (ambient mix) – 7:01
7. Endorphin – "Satie 1" – 3:08
8. Nitin Sawhney – "Homelands" – 5:59
9. Rae & Christian – "A Distant Invitation" – 5:14
10. Bugge Wesseltoft – "Existence" (Edit) – 7:03
11. Paco Fernández & Levitation feat. Cathy Battistessa – "Oh Home" – 4:23
12. Marc Collin – "Les Kid Nappeurs Main Theme" – 4:12
13. Moonrock – "Ill Street Blues" – 3:46
14. Dusty Springfield – "The Look of Love" – 3:41
1. NOTE: The Australian release of "Café del Mar Volumen Seis" ((c)1999 Mercury Records Ltd (London)) does not contain the additional track 'José Padilla – "Adios Ayer" – 5:35 ' between tracks 12 and 13 in the track list above, that some other releases (such as the EU release) do.

=== Volume 7 (Volumen Siete) ===
Compiled by Bruno

2000

1. Lux – "Northern Lights"
2. Afterlife – "Breather 2000" (Arithunda mix)
3. Moby – "Whispering Wind"
4. Deep & Wide – "Easy Rider"
5. Bush – "Letting the Cables Sleep" (The Nightmares on Wax remix)
6. UKO – "Sunbeams"
7. Aromabar – "Winter Pageant"
8. Bedrock – "Beautiful Strange"
9. A New Funky Generation feat. Joy Rose – "One More Try"
10. Bent – "Swollen"
11. Underwolves – "68 Moves"
12. Øystein Sevåg & Lakki Patey – "Cahuita"
13. Slow Pulse feat. Cathy Battistessa – "Riva"

=== Volume 8 (Volumen Ocho) ===
Compiled by Luke Neville & Ben Cherill

2001

1. Goldfrapp – "Utopia" (New Ears mix)
2. Thomas Newman – "Any Other Name"
3. Afterlife – "Sunrise" (DJ Thunda & The K-20 Allstars remix)
4. Dido – "Worthless"
5. Mari Boine – "Gula Gula" (Chilluminati mix)
6. Lux – "100 Billion Stars"
7. Mark de Clive-Lowe – "Day by Day" (DJ Spinna remix edit)
8. Ben Onono – "Tatouage Bleu (Avec Chet)"
9. Illumination – "Cookie Raver"
10. Tiny Tunes – "Will You Catch Me" (Twin Tunes mix edit)
11. Skinny – "Morning Light" (A. H. mix)
12. Digby Jones – "Piña Colada" (jazz mix)
13. Scripture – "Apache"
14. Lamb – "Gabriel"

=== Volume 9 (Volumen Nueve) ===
Volumes 9–11 compiled by Bruno

2002

1. Jo Manji – "Beyond the Sunset"
2. Lovers Lane – "Island Memories" (original mix)
3. Blank & Jones – "Desire" (ambient mix)
4. Kalliope – "Lunar Landings"
5. So Fine – "A Day in the Sun"
6. Miro – "The Cure" (sunshine mix)
7. Rue du Soleil – "Troya"
8. Soft Wave – "Plenitude Part 2"
9. CDM – "Many Rivers to Cross"
10. Quantic – "Time Is the Enemy"
11. Trio Mafua – "Quente"
12. Lazybatusu – "8:00 AM"
13. Swen G* feat. Inusa – "Morning Light" (coffee shop remix)
14. Digitano & CDM – "Rajamanta" [interactive track for Win and Mac]

=== Volume 10 (Volumen Diez) ===
2003

1. Substructure – "Firewire"
2. Remote – "Postcard"
3. Future Loop Foundation feat. Michael Conn – "My Movie Is Like Life"
4. Lovers Lane – "Face of Beauty" (original mix)
5. DAB – "The Blues"
6. Rue du Soleil – "In My Heart"
7. Kinema – "Katia"
8. Rhian Sheehan – "Garden Children"
9. Terra Del Sol – "Sea Goddess"
10. Ohm-G & Bruno – "On Your Skin"
11. Nacho Sotomayor – "Remember You"
12. Vargo – "The Moment" (original mix)
13. Ypey – "Without You"
14. Blank & Jones feat. Anne Clark – "The Hardest Heart" (ambient mix)

=== Volume 11 (Volumen Once) ===
2004

1. Rhian Sheehan – "Te Karanga"
2. M-Seven – "Invisible"
3. Ludvig & Stelar – "Signal" (ambient mix)
4. Jens Gad – "Art Nouveau"
5. Ohm-G & Bruno – "In'Side"
6. Adani & Wolf feat. Praful – "Where Would I Be" (Memoria Vermelha mix)
7. Sonic Adventure Project – "Waters in Motion"
8. Miro – "Holding On"
9. Rue Du Soleil – "Estonia"
10. JP Juice – "Cette Planète"
11. Digby Jones – "Under the Sea"
12. Tactful – "No Fear"
13. Henrik T – "Sueño de la Montaña"
14. DAB – "Dream On"
15. POCCO – "Only T55"

=== Volume 12 (Volumen Doce) ===
2005

- CD 1
1. DAB feat. Enrique Bunbury – "Sácame de Aquí"
2. Slaven Kolak – "All Shades of Blue"
3. Elcho – "Lazy Summer Days"
4. Alessandro Boschi – "Empuriabrava"
5. New Beginning – "Another Day"
6. Melibea – "Antología Café del Mar"
7. Arnica Montana – "Sea, Sand and Sun"
8. Alejandro de Pinedo – "Aquarius"
9. Rafa Gas & F3R Delgado feat. Raúl Mendoza – "Quiéreme Otra Vez"
10. André Andreo – "South Beach Soul"
11. Chris Le Blanc feat. Liz June – "Enjoy Your Life"
12. Jo Manji – "Lazy Loungin"
13. Steen Thøttrup feat. Annette Berg – "Save a Little Prayer"
14. La Caina – "Bailando Va"
- CD 2
1. Blank & Jones feat. Mike Francis – "Someone Like You"
2. Viggo – "Eso Es"
3. Francesca M. – "Montreux Jazz"
4. Luminous – "Make It Happen"
5. Paco Fernández – "Junto Al Mar"
6. La Caina – "Le Vent m'a Dit"
7. Mahara MC Kay – "One Life"
8. Rafa Gas & F3R Delgado feat. Lucia Montoya – "Amanecer En Bolonia"
9. Friction – "Looking Down"
10. Pep Lladó – "Two Rivers, One World"
11. Yann Kuhlmann – "La Mauritia"
12. Nera & Felix – "Con Amor"
13. Koru – "Otis"
14. Light Of Aidan – "Lament"

=== Volume 13 (Volumen Trece) ===
2006

- CD 1
1. Steen Thøttrup feat. Annette Berg – "Heading for the Sunrise"
2. One Mind's Eye feat. Elsieanne – "Shiva"
3. Kitty The Bill – "Mister Mista"
4. Gary B – "Set Me Free"
5. Elenah – "Cositas de la Vida"
6. Ritmo Intacto – "Indígena"
7. E-Love – "Cause I Love You No More" (Alster Lounge chill out vocal mix)
8. Slaven Kolak – "Panonia"
9. Roberto Sol – "So Awesome"
10. DAB – "Pure Joy"
11. Ivan Tucakov – "Cinnabar Mix"
12. Triangle Sun – "Beautiful"
13. Gelka – "Os Pastores da Noitte"
14. Future Loop Foundation – "Monika's Summer"
15. Alejandro de Pinedo – "Capricorn"
- CD 2
1. Nera & Felix – "Del Mar"
2. La Caina – "No Talking"
3. Ibizarre – "Las Brisas"
4. Rue du Soleil – "Angel Eyes"
5. Singas Project – "Voice"
6. Melibea – "Lamento"
7. Yann Kuhlmann feat. Fuego – "Hablo del Amor"
8. Mads Arp feat. Julie Harrington – "The Meaning of Love"
9. Paco Fernández – "Flores de Libertad"
10. Jeff Bennett's Lounge Experience feat. Alexandra – "Sympathy"
11. Luminous feat. Julie Harrington – "Let You In"
12. Pep Lladó feat. Antonio "El Ñoño" Martinez – "Vai Vedere"
13. Hey Negrita – "One Mississippi" (Chris Coco mix)
14. Víctor G. de la Fuente feat. Óscar Portugués – "Tu Despertar" (original chill mix)
15. Viggo feat. Glow – "Rivers Flow"

=== Volume 14 (Volumen Catorce) ===
2007

- CD 1
1. Light of Aidan feat. Note for a Child – 'Loving You'
2. Andrey Denisov – 'Night Highway'
3. Kitty the Bill – 'Cabriolet Tour'
4. Tape Five – 'Longitude'
5. DAB – 'Genesis'
6. Deeper & Pacific Feat. Daniela Ferraz – 'Una Passion Perdida'
7. Mahara McKay – 'Soulsmooth'
8. Alexander Vögele & Jillene Luce – 'Soul Connection'
9. Rue du Soleil – 'Missing'
10. La Caina – 'Do Tara Alap'
11. Camino del Sol – 'Dans Les Rues de Barcelone...'
12. Elenah – 'Luz de Hielo'
13. Steen Thøttrup – 'El Alba'
14. Almadrava – 'Land of Eternal Sunset'
15. Michael Hornstein – 'Carma'
16. Elmara – 'Training'
- CD 2
1. Viggo feat. Anuska – 'Childhood'
2. Melibea – 'Jam'in Dawn'
3. Duo Mecanico – 'Love Luxury'
4. Agron – 'Love my Soul'
5. Schwarz & Funk – 'Remando al Viento'
6. Jazzy Pecada – 'Slow Down'
7. Gary B – 'Love Rain Down'
8. Alejandro de Pinedo – 'Wonderland'
9. Clélia Felix – 'Hidden Island'
10. Teri Richardson –'Shadows of my Love'
11. Ypey – 'Love in Spain'
12. Orgatronics – 'Viva Cuba Musica'
13. Nouvelle Vedette feat. Fleur Sanderson – 'With You'
14. Alessandro Boschi – 'Sentosa'
15. Koru – 'I Believe'

=== Volume 15 (Volumen Quince) ===
2008

- CD 1
1. Reunited – Sun is Shining
2. Melibea – Wake Up
3. Ludvig & Stelar – Relax
4. Jazzy Pecada – Avantguard
5. Nera – Life is a Wonder
6. Soula & Angela – Night Wave in Ibiza
7. Eleni – World
8. Clelia Felix – Smiling Faces
9. Villablue – One Step Away
10. Orgatronics – Tren Lento a Juliaca
11. Lento – Stop
12. Soulchillaz – Alright
13. Paco Fernández – What Are We Living
14. Gary B – I Will Be Waiting
- CD 2
1. DAB – Summer Memories
2. Alexander Vögele feat. Jillene Luce – Breakaway
3. Gary B – Eternally Yours
4. Gelka feat. Beth Hirsch – Under My Star
5. Alessandro Boschi – Tarifa: Colores en el Viento
6. Koru – Closer
7. Ensoul – Perfect Days
8. Aitor Escobar – Mi Keny
9. Santa Cruz – On the Shore
10. Duo Mecanico – Charade
11. Soul Electrico – Strangers No More
12. Marc Puig feat. Maria Collado – To Forget Me
13. Yuliet Topaz – Jesus in the Sun
14. La Caina – Indian Moon
- CD 3
1. Steen Thøttrup feat. Katie McGregor – Sunset People
2. Stigma – Eternity
3. Tape Five – Sandbank
4. Rue du Soleil – Higher
5. Kosta Rodríguez feat. Amy – Gale in the Waterglass (My Love)
6. Alejandro de Pinedo – Sax 4 Sex
7. Kotik – I See
8. Schwarz & Funk – Junto al Mar
9. Almadrava – Fly Away
10. Zaharamusic – Aire
11. The Birdstones – Closer
12. J.R. Haim – Sueño de una Gaviota
13. Fernando Marañón – Trocadero
14. Atlan Chill – Interface
15. Elmara – Skyline

=== Volume 16 (Volumen Dieciséis) ===
2009

- CD 1
1. Cécile Bredie – The Autumn Leaves / Les Feuilles Mortes
2. Noise Boyz feat. Io Vita – Declaration Of Love
3. Roberto Sol & Florito feat. Martine – Won't Give Up
4. Ivan Tucakov & Tambura Rasa – Gypsy Love Mix
5. Andreas Agiannitopoulos – Cause I'm Not Sorry...
6. Clélia Felix – Dancing With The Sun
7. Ingo Herrmann – Rain Of Love
8. Bas aka Stefano Baldetti – Aethalia
9. Aware – En Busca Del Sol
10. Yuliet Topaz – A Miracle
11. Sol Eléctrico – Come With Me
12. Romu Agulló – Sueños
13. Thomas Lemmer – Fatigué
14. Mark Watson – Long Flight Home
15. Future Proof – Sea Bird
16. Elmara – Sky In Your Eyes
- CD 2
1. Gary B – Stronger Love
2. Koru – Hear Me
3. DAB – You And Me
4. Valentin Huedo & Atfunk – Until The Sun Goes Down
5. Lenny Ibizarre – El Viejo Pescador
6. Alexander Vögele feat. Jillence Luce – Inner Music
7. Alejandro de Pinedo – Hotel Utopia
8. Ludvig & Stelar – How Does It Feel?
9. Villablue feat. Slide – On My Mind
10. Schwarz & Funk – Savannah Sunset
11. Steen Thottrup – If You Were Here Tonight
12. Soulchillaz – Promised Land
13. Rue du Soleil – Atlantis
14. Jesús Mondéjar – Acoustic Feeling
15. Paul Hardcastle – Don't You Know
16. Toni Simonen – Terrace

=== Volume 17 (Volumen Diecisiete) ===
2011

- CD 1
1. Glide & Swerve – Y Môr
2. Deep Josh & Jose Rodriguez feat. Lisa Rose – The Clouds
3. Stefano Carpi – After the Sea
4. Clélia Félix – Shine So Bright
5. Glenn Main – Message to Spain
6. Luis Hermandez – Smile
7. Joy Askew – Starlight
8. Paco Fernández – Mani in Da House
9. Bob Zopp – Mi Novia
10. Stéphanie Mathieu – Take Time
11. Music On Canvas feat. Tabitha – Upside Down
12. Michael Hornstein – Boom Boom
13. J. R. Haim – Lejos
14. Atlan Chill – September
- CD 2
1. Luminous – Forever
2. J. R. Haim – Puesta del Sol
3. Sabrina Carnevale – Nobody Can Say
4. Luis Hermandez – A Tu Lado (Instrumental Mix)
5. Glide & Swerve – Aasha
6. Alejandro De Pinedo – Raindrops
7. Mahara Mckay & Minus 8 – Beautiful Day
8. Ingo Herrmann – Inner Truth
9. Coastline – Adriatic Sea (Milews remix)
10. Gitano & Deep Josh feat. Koo – Residence Lounge
11. Crystin – Something Beautiful (Red Roses remix by Lemongrass)
12. Solaris Navis – Blissful Memories
13. Elimar – Prosody
14. Elmara – Transit

=== Volume 18 (Volumen Dieciocho) ===
Compiled by Toni Simonen 2012

- CD 1
1. D*Note – Love Is Wise
2. Blank & Jones with Jason Caesar – Hideaway
3. Chris Coco – Cape Clear
4. Bent – The Park
5. Ultra Naté – The Rush
6. Lux – Sunset Disco
7. Talvin Singh & Niladri Kumar – The Bliss
8. Chicane – Goldfish
9. Unkle – Trouble in Paradise (Variation of a Theme)
10. Moby – Lie Down in Darkness (Ben Hoo's Dorian Vibe)
11. Ben Onono – Big Blue Moon
12. Lamb – Dischord
- CD 2
1. Afterlife – Espalmador
2. Gelka – Have You Kept Your Ticket?
3. Ganga – Gymnastics
4. Faithless – Love Is My Condition (feat. Mia Maestro)
5. Aromabar – Simple Life
6. Kid Stone ft. Lovely Laura – Rio
7. Silent Way – The Cloud
8. James Bright – No Better Feeling
9. No Logo – Vibrafone
10. Hannah Ild – Right Beside You (Afterlife Mix)
11. Hybrid – Blind Side
12. Underworld – To Heal

=== Volume 19 (Volumen Diecinueve) ===
Compiled by Toni Simonen 2013

CD 1
1. Blank & Jones – Miracle Man (feat. Cathy Battistessa) [Beached]
2. Steely M – Summer Breeze
3. Gelka – Being You (feat. Phoenix Pearle)
4. Afterlife – Suddenly
5. Moya – Lost and Found (No Logo Remix)
6. The Ramona Flowers – So Many Colours
7. Ashley Height – Painkillers
8. Ben Onono – Small World
9. Bonobo – First Fires (feat. Grey Reverend)
10. Kate Bush – Running Up That Hill (A Deal With God 2012 Remix)
11. The xx – Sunset
12. Steve Miller & Rachel Lloyd – Salt Water Waves (feat. Rachel Lloyd)
13. Moby & Mark Lanegan – The Lonely Night (feat. Mark Lanegan) [Moby January 14 Remix]
CD 2
1. D*Note – Sylvia
2. Space Designers – Nothing Really Matters
3. Ziller – Pearl & Dean
4. James Bright – Be
5. Silent Way – Pretty Good
6. Lux – Golden
7. No Logo – Matter of Time
8. Kinobe – Lotus Eater
9. Aromabar – Renegade
10. Hazy J – Our Way
11. Chris Coco & Sacha Puttnam – Human
12. Jacob Gurevitsch – Lovers In Paris
13. Bliss – End Titles
14. Toni Simonen – Café del Mar, Vol. 19 (Continuous Mix 1)
15. Toni Simonen – Café del Mar, Vol. 19 (Continuous Mix 2)

=== Volume 20 (Volumen Veinte) ===
Compiled by Toni Simonen 2014

CD 1
1. So Here We Are (Nightmares on Wax)
2. Jo (Goldfrapp)
3. Look at the Sun (Seahawks Feat. Tim Burgess)
4. On the Beach (Nick Et Samantha)
5. Still Here (Rae & Christian Feat. Gita Langley)
6. Painting Silhouettes (Quantic)
7. Solaris (Penguin Café)
8. Unknown Touch (Henrik Schwarz)
9. A Case for Shame (Moby with Cold Specks)
10. Holograms (M83)
11. Hypnose (Sbastien Tellier)
12. Lower Your Eyelids to Die with the Sun (M83)
CD 2
1. Sea of Glass (Tom Middleton – Jon Hopkins Remix)
2. Perfume Suite (Trafik)
3. Memories of Love (Synkro)
4. Hawkmoth (Plaid)
5. Head Centre (Lux)
6. Flying Clouds (Gelka Feat. Phoenix Pearle)
7. North Star (Faithless)
8. Under the Ice (Morcheeba)
9. Doubter (Alex Barck Feat. Jonatan Bckelie)
10. Reach for the Dead (Boards of Canada)
11. Everything That Rises (Moby)
12. Finished Symphony (Soundtrack) (Hybrid)

=== Volume 21 (Volumen Veintiuno) ===
Compiled by Toni Simonen 2015

CD 1
1. Slip Into Something More Comfortable (Played Live Mix) (Kinobe)
2. If I Could Tell You (Nev Cottee)
3. Freedom Of The Floor (Open Space Remix) (Nautic)
4. Waterfall (Slow 2 Lounge Mix) (Atlantic Ocean)
5. Heavy Weather (Caia)
6. La Taza De Oro (Waldemar Schwartz)
7. Friday Freaks (Pig & Dan)
8. Ancestral Melody (No Logo)
9. Time Spent (Ganga)
10. Siempre (James Bright)
11. Hotel Odemark (Tommy Awards)
12. Over & Over (The Broken Orchestra & Natalie Gardiner)
13. Slow Breathing Circuit (A Winged Victory For The Sullen Remix) (Inventions)
CD 2
1. Gelis (Flako)
2. No. 1. (Lent Et Douloureux) (ISAN)
3. Rooftops (DeeB)
4. Distant Eyes (Synkro (2))
5. So Distant (Himalia)
6. Stockholmsnatt (Farbror Resande Mac)
7. Compendium (Brand New Start)
8. Raindust (Asura)
9. The Swimmer (Phil France)
10. Der Himmel U-ber Berlin (Solo Piano Version) (Raffaele Attanasio)
11. Stars (Yosi Horikawa)
12. Breakfast (Thomas Prime Featuring James Rose)
13. Million Nights (Gelka Featuring Phoenix Pearle)
14. She (Cmd Edit) (Pensees)
15. La Ritournelle (Cmd Edit) (T_Mo)

=== Volume 22 (Volumen Veintidós) ===
Compiled by Víctor Gomez 2016

CD 1
1. D.K. – Evening shadows
2. Bloom – Fall
3. Ash Walker – Bongo legs
4. D-Pulse – Velocity of love (Hot Toddy Mix)
5. Double Yellow – Feed you (Ambient Jazz Ensemble Rework)
6. Slowly Rolling Camera – Slowly Rolling Camera
7. All India Radio – Sunburst
8. Kasseo & Cordelia O'Driscoll – In your eyes
9. Yann Dulché – Faith (feat. Dinia)
10. Kinkajous – Vinam (Chpln Remix)
11. Lyves – Darkest hour
12. Gogo Penguin – Murmuration
13. Hecq – Night falls
14. Luke Howard – The ends
CD 2
1. Wilson Tanner – Sun room
2. Terrane & Thomas Prime – Carve our fate
3. Doc Daneeka & Abigail Wyles – Tobyjug
4. Furns – Fortress
5. Cathy Battistessa – Two eye's
6. Hazy J – Silver
7. James Bright – Low
8. Stratus – Oxwich
9. Helios – Every passing hour
10. Neeco Delaf – Anthropology
11. FM-84 & Clive Farrington – Goodbye
12. Pensees – Intro
13. Owsey – To the child drifting out at sea
14. Gidge – Norrland

=== Volume 23 (Volumen Veintitres) ===
Compiled by Toni Simonen 2017

CD 1
1. Télépopmusik – Breathe (Kartell Slow Remix)
2. Vincenzo – Today
3. Arms And Sleepers – Pan Am
4. Kraak & Smaak – Stumble (Blue Motel Remix)
5. Blue States – Vision Trail
6. Flo Morrissey And Matthew E. White – Everybody Loves The Sunshine
7. Bibio – Petals
8. Zero 7 – Last Light
9. Penguin Cafe – Cantorum
10. Ben Lukas Boysen – Nocturne 3
11. Bonobo – Second Sun
12. The Cinematic Orchestra – To Believe
13. Brian Eno – Fickle Sun (iii) I'm Set Free
CD 2
1. Sasha – Vapour Trails
2. Goldfrapp – Beast That Never Was
3. Blank & Jones – Snappiness (Afterlife Mix)
4. DJ Day – Four Hills
5. Stimulator Jones – La Mano
6. White Elephant (2) – Sir John
7. Calibre – Gentle Push
8. Moby & The Void Pacific Choir – Are You Lost In The World Like Me
9. Jimmy Whoo – Outro (My High)
10. Song Sung – I'm Not In Love
11. Gabin – Urban Night
12. Still-Life & Tim Laverack – Milieu
13. Afterlife – Blue Bar (Chris Coco Remix)
14. Sacha Puttnam – Abraham's Theme (On-U Sound Dub)

== Café del Mar – The Best of ==
Compiled By José Padilla 2003

- CD 1
1. Paco de Lucia – Entre dos Aguas
2. Karen Ramirez – Troubled Girl (Spanish Version)
3. Ben Onono – Tatouage Bleu (Avec Chet)
4. Mari Boine – Gula gula (Chilluminati Mix)
5. Lux – Northern Lights
6. José Padilla – Adios Ayer
7. Lamb – Angelica
8. The Sabres of Paradise – Smokebelch II (Beatles mix)
9. Phil Mison – Lula
10. Coldplay – God Put a Smile Upon Your Face (Def Inc. remix)
11. Moonrock – Ill Street Blues
12. The Ballistic Brothers – Uschi's Groove
13. A New Funky Generation – The Messenger
- CD 2
1. The Penguin Café Orchestra – Music for a Found Harmonium
2. Les Negresses Vertes – Face A La Mer (massive attack remix)
3. Zuell – Olas de sal
4. A. R. Rahman – Mumbai theme tune
5. A Man Called Adam – Easter song
6. John Martyn – Sunshine's Better (Talvin Singh remix)
7. José Padilla – Come Back
8. U2 – In a Little While (N.O.W. remix)
9. Moby – Whispering Wind
10. UKO – Sunbeams
11. Lamb – Trans Fatty Acid (Kruder & Dorfmeister Remix Edit)
12. Bush – Letting The Cables Sleep (N.O.W. Remix)
13. Nookie – Paradise
14. Electribe 101 – Talking With Myself

== Café del Mar – Dreams ==
- Volume 2–4 compiled by Bruno Lepretre

=== Volume 1 ===
Compiled by Ramón Guiral

1. A Man Called Adam – Estelle
2. D'Note – D'Votion
3. The Sabres of Paradise – Haunted Dancehall
4. Miro – Emotions of Paradise –
5. Nightmares On Wax – Nights Interlude (original version)
6. The Sabres of Paradise – Smokebelch II (Beatless Mix)
7. Afterlife – Blue Bar
8. Underworld – Second Hand
9. A Man Called Adam with Eddie Parker – Easter Song
10. Penguin Cafe Orchestra – Music for a Found Harmonium
11. Nacho Sotomayor – Café del Mar

=== Volume 2 ===
1. Sonic Adventure Project – Forty–Two
2. Vargo – Get Back to Serenity (Beach Mix)
3. Deep & Wide – Castillos de Arena
4. Trumpet Man & Cottonbelly – Don't Move
5. Ohm G – Chilli Conkani
6. Rue Du Soleil – Dreaming Of
7. Plastyc Buddha – Voyeur de Luxe
8. Racoon feat. Christine Lucas – Beautiful Smile
9. David Hertz – Believe
10. Jaffa – Do it Again
11. Cool Water feat. Time Passing – The Last Night
12. Orange & Tusnelda – Stay Asleep
13. Ypey – Mellow

=== Volume 3 ===
1. Zino & Tommy – Ain't Feel Nothing
2. Gelka – Please Keep Your Ticket Till the End of Your Trip
3. DAB – Have a Smoke
4. Luminous – Hold On
5. Deise Mikhail – Picasso Suite / Theme from the Summer of '42
6. André Andreo – Themes from New Earth
7. Buffalo Sánchez – By Your Side
8. OHM-G & Bruno – Electric Jungle
9. Martin Böttcher – Old Shatterhand Melodie
10. Hibiki Connection – Cha Ha Too
11. José Luis Zafra – Ritmo del Mar
12. Rue du Soleil – Manush
13. Gaia Project – Oasis

NOTE: The track listing is in a different order on later releases with an additional track "Bliss: Sleep Will Come" added at the beginning

1. Bliss – Sleep Will Come
2. OhmG & Bruno – Jungle Light
3. Gaia Project – Oasis
4. Luminius – Hold On
5. Silent Sounds By Deise Mikhail – The Picasso Suite-Theme From Summer Of 42
6. Zino & Tommy – Ain't Feel Nothing
7. Gelka – Please Keep Your Ticket Till The End
8. Martin Boettcher – Old Shatterhand ( orbient mix )
9. Rue Du Soleil – Manush
10. Buffalo Sanchez – By Your Side
11. Hibiki Connection – Cha-Ka-Too (sunset mix)
12. Andre Andreo – Themes From New Earth
13. DAB – Have A Smoke
14. Josè Luis Zafra – Ritmo Del Mar

=== Volume 4 ===
- CD 1
1. Gary B – It's Alright
2. DJ Ino Marcelino Galan – Linda
3. Luminous – Feel Safe
4. Mads Arp feat. Julie Harrington – Alive
5. Gelka – Rising
6. Psychodelic Farm – El Sonho
7. Sonic Adventure Project – Inner Journey (Remix)
8. Ludwig & Stelar – Sunset
9. Alejandro de Pinedo – Cancer
10. Melibea – Fusion
11. Florian Sagner's Groove Department – Deep Breath
12. Nouvelle Vedette feat. Fleur Sanderson – Dreaming
13. Koru – Submariner
14. Camino del Sol – L'Etoile d'Or (Estrela de Ouro)
- CD 2
1. Teri Richardson – Eyes Wide Open
2. Aisen – Another Day
3. Blank & Jones – Twilight
4. Aaron Taylor – Let You Go
5. Groove Lovers – Mediterranean Star
6. Alessandro Boschi – Cuevas del Drach
7. DAB – The Call
8. Alexander Vogele – Ibizarre
9. Rue du Soleil – In My Heart
10. Cardinal Zen – Far from Home
11. Vargo – Precious (Part One)
12. Ohm–G & M. Bussian – By Change
13. Aware – Esperando la Lluvia
14. La Caina – Bailando Va

== Café del Mar – Chillhouse Mix ==
- Café del Mar Chillhouse Mix – Vols. 1 to 5

Compiled by Bruno Lepretre

=== Volume 1 (1999) ===
- CD 1
1. Deep & Wide – private matter
2. Solaris Heights – Fusique
3. Frederik Stark & Citydreams – Loungin
4. Johnny Fiasco – Fallin
5. Arsenal – Release (Attaboy vocal mix)
6. Weekender – Hugo a Gogo
7. Trumpet Man – So Good
8. Lhk Productions – Changes
9. East West Connection – The More I Get, The More I Want (Teddy's House Groove)
10. Freil – Mississippi Rollcall
- CD 2
1. Sun Trust – How Intensitive
2. Bone City – Feeling Kinda Blue
3. Kerry Chandler – I Know
4. François K. feat. The Alchemist – On the Way
5. Deep & Wide – No Other Lover (Café del Mar Mix)
6. Kamasutra feat. Carrina Joseph – Burnin' (Baron's Vibes Mix)
7. Irving Project – Pick Me Up (Shroom Tea Mix)
8. Mateo & Matos – In the Mood
9. Terra Deva – Inside (Naked Lovers Dub)
10. Julius Papp & Dave Warrin – Come Morning (Jazz Excursion Mix)

=== Volume 2 (2001) ===
- CD 1
1. C&M Productions feat. Marcel – True House (Jask's Deep House–Apella)
2. Deep & Wide – Esa Magia
3. Solar House – Got 2 B U
4. Mark Grant – Jazzy Kinda Sum´N
5. Roy Davis Jr. – Michael (Love from San Francisco vocal mix)
6. Mimosa – Wind Chime
7. Little Green Men – Time Changes
8. Projekt: PM – When the Voices Come
9. Jamie Anderson – Oceanic
10. Petalpusher – Surrender
11. Stp feat. Kevin Yost – An American in Paris
12. Rubba J – Meeting Point
- CD 2
1. Mettle Music – Tranquility
2. Acuarian Dream – Love and Tears (Soul Creatures – reworked live mix)
3. Next Evidence – Blowin' Drums
4. Julius Papp – Control
5. Bebel Gilberto – Sem Contenção
6. Teddy G. – Brazilia City Mix
7. Joshua – Watch the Bass
8. To-Ka Project – Two Stones Ahead
9. Fish Go Deep – Flying Funk
10. Natural Calamity – And That's Saying a Lot (Groove Armada 2nd take)
11. Restless Soul feat. Nathan Haines – After Ours (Dennis F's Purgatory mix)

=== Volume 3 (2002) ===
- CD 1
1. Mettle Music – Moodswing
2. Duran & García – Dream Love
3. Primary Colors feat. Nicole – Say That U Love Me (F-Thing vocal mix)
4. Dave Barker – Meanwhile...
5. Solar House – Freedom
6. Patrick Green – Feel the Vibes (Path Session mix)
7. 75 Moods feat. Dexter Porter – My Love (Kiko Navarro's So Deep mix)
8. Mark Gorbulew – Manhattan Groove (Ernest Bonzet Start Stop remix)
9. Serjaye – Mahal Kita (I Love You) [Sounds of Soul's Funkessential remix]
10. East West Connection – East West (club mix)
11. Frankie Valentine – Moog Rock
- CD 2
1. The Amalgamation of Soundz – Maze [original mix]
2. Jay – J & Andrew Macari – Little Bit of Jazz
3. Khaimar – Music for the People (Vincent Kwok's mood funk remix)
4. Alexkid – Night Lines
5. Richard Les Crees – Until the Day
6. The Timewriter – So Free
7. Echomen – Thru 2 You (C.J. one vocal mix)
8. Trumpetman – Siempre
9. T-Kolai – The Most High (centric mix)
10. Lo-Motion – Give Me Your Soul
11. Minus 8 – Thaia

=== Volume 4 (2005) ===
- CD 1
1. The Defloristics – Back in the Days
2. John Dahlbäck – Magic Touch
3. Steven García – Rise & Fall
4. Brs – Spring Dom
5. Filur – Release
6. Numaro – Losing Control
7. Aya – Sean (Eric's 2 WFU Dub)
8. Wei-Chi – Faces and Places
9. Downtown Brooklyn, Inc. – 10 Jay Street (610 dub)
10. Inverse Cinematics – It's Music (Nightshift Meets Nujazsoul mix)
11. Lockhart – Looking Across the River (Physics Electro Light District mix)
- CD 2
1. Martínez – Antares Pt. 1
2. Eminence Feat. Syreeta Neal – Slave To The Poison (island groove remix)
3. Ross Couch – Feel It (Diesel, Desmet & Mai's Gimme Some remix)
4. Yoyo – Take It
5. J. T. Donaldson – Trust Me (Broadway & Wilson mix)
6. Gutbrod + Bruno feat. From Ibiza – Electric Blues
7. Soul Khula feat. Miss Identity – "Fire" (Native New Yorkers Sweet and deep dub)
8. Onda – Waiting For Your Love (François K. dub)
9. Colette – Didn't Mean to Turn You On" (Chuck Love remix)
10. Milesart Orchestra "Time For Peace" (Joan Ribas Musical mix)
11. Jerome Sydenham feat. Mikael Nordgren – Stockholm Go Bang! (club mix)

=== Volume 5 (2007) ===
- CD 1
1. Deep Collective – Lies
2. Steven García – Mesmeriz
3. DJ Ino – Maruxa Wanna Dance
4. Robin Masters Orchestra – Searching My Soul
5. Trouble feat. Ian Whitelaw & Meitz – Phonique
6. Dr. Deep House – Beautiful Morning
7. Dennis Ferrer feat. Malena Pérez – I Can't Go Under
8. François Dubois – I Try (Original Mix)
9. Two Armadillos – Tunnel of Light
10. Fat Freddy's Drop – Hope (3 Generations Walking Remix)
- CD 2
1. Sunshine Jones – Anywhere You Are
2. Hugo Giner – Dark Children
3. Valentín Huedo & C. Banx – German Boys
4. Franck Roger – Rebirth
5. Chubby Dubz – See it Thur (Machomovers remix)
6. Da Funk – Dig Dis (Cloudsteppers Remix)
7. Jean feat. Cochois – Electronique Love (remix)
8. Sendos Fuera – Running
9. Audio Soul Project – Community (Fish Go deep vocal mix)
10. Solar Sides – Booty Call

== Café del Mar – Aria (2004) ==
- Café del Mar Aria – Vols. 1 to 3 and Best of

=== Volume 1 ===
1. Willow
2. Un Bel Di
3. Secret Tear
4. Dido
5. Pace Pace
6. Pamina Blue
7. Habanera
8. Home

=== Volume 2 ===
1. Arianna
2. Ebben
3. Addio
4. Horizon
5. Barcarolle
6. Cantilena
7. Sviraj (Lullabye)
8. Interlude
9. Pavane
10. Ave Maria
11. Leiermann
12. Lullabye (Sviraj)

=== Volume 3 ===
1. Ombra mai fu – Based on the aria from Handel's Serse
2. Furioso – Based on Handel's "Sarabande", words from Psalm 7
3. Sogno – Based on the aria from Puccini's La rondine
4. Metamorphosis 2: Danae
5. Ballo – Based on an aria from Verdi's Ballo in maschera
6. Interlude: Lorchestre Engloutie
7. Amami – Based on the aria from Verdi's La traviata
8. Lascia – Based on the aria from Handel's Rinaldo
9. Farewell – Based on the aria from Puccini's Madama Butterfly
10. Metamorphosis 3: Cyane
11. Ascension – Based on the duet from Monteverdi's L'incoronazione di Poppea
12. Metamorphosis 1: Arachne
13. Furioso: Instrumental Mix
14. Ombra: Chilled Mix

=== Best Of 1999 ===
1. Secret Tear
2. Lascia
3. Habanera
4. Willow
5. Horizon
6. Furioso
7. Ascension
8. Pavane
9. Arianna
10. Pamina Blue
11. Ave Marie
12. Metamorphosis 2: Danae

== Café del Mar – Aniversario ==
=== 20th Aniversario (2000) ===
- CD1
1. Nimbus – Subconscious Mind
2. Deep & Wide – Seven Seas
3. Envers Du Plan – I Want Your Love
4. Trüby Trio – Prima Vera
5. Fluff – Mums
6. Afterlife – Falling
7. The Horns of Plenty – Altogether Blue
8. Almagamation of Soundz – Enchant Me
9. Single Cell Orchestra – Transmit Liberation
10. Ypey – Behind the Screen
11. Moodorama – Jazz Tip
12. La Rocca – Island of God
13. Solaris Heights – Elementis
- CD2
1. Mental Generation – Café del Mar
2. Jean Michel Jarre – Oxygene – Part 4
3. Dave A. Stewart feat. Candy Dulfer – Lily Was Here
4. Jon and Vangelis – So Long Ago, So Clear
5. Foundland – Cloud Pattern
6. Brightlight – Feeling Weird
7. Tony Stevens – Good Night the Sun
8. Andreas Vollenweider – Behind the Gardens – Behind the Wall – Under the Tree
9. Café del Mar – Irish Women
10. Christian Alvad – Rite
11. Garland Dr. feat. Svendasmuss – Offering of Love

=== 25th Aniversario (2005) ===
- CD1
1. Lovers Lane – Private Session (25th Mix)
2. Vargo – Talking One Language (Anniversary Mix)
3. Ludvig & Stelar – Reflection
4. Lumininius – I Believe in You
5. Jo Manji – Innocence
6. Henrik T. – Espiral
7. Zuell – Albariza
8. André Andreo – Sensual Bay
9. Digitano feat. Pepe Haro – El Kiosco
10. A Man Called Adam vs. Chris Coco – Knots
11. Gary B – Lead Me Home
12. Rue du Soleil – La Française
13. Gelka – Hidding Place
14. Digital Analog Band – The Call
15. Ypey – Life Time
16. Olaf Gutbrod – Moment of Passion
- CD2
1. Alessandro Boschi – Ojo de Vega
2. Tom Oliver – Free Your Mind
3. Azioni Musicali – Volviendo al Sur
4. Mic Max – Como el Viento
5. Omaya – Novo
6. Melibea – Boheme
7. Camiel – Take Me to This Place
8. Cold Valley – Another Day
9. Roberto Sol & Nera – Sensuality
10. Lemongrass – Bee
11. Glenn Maltman – Chillin'
12. DJ3 – Vertigo
13. Shiloh – The Gift
14. Alejandro de Pinedo – Sex on the Beach
15. H. Garden feat. Joi – Gentle Rain
- CD3
1. Leslie Round – Calling Back
2. Koru – The Meeting
3. Steen Thøttrup feat. Anne K – I Hope Yesterday Never Comes
4. Zednah – Voluptuous Sunrise
5. Marc Puig – To Start Anew
6. New Beginning – Nuevo Comienzo
7. Chrome vs. Reyne – Newex
8. The Light of Aidan feat. Zia Williams – Snowbird
9. Prodoxo – Bailanduna
10. Elcho – Stop the World (Aquatint Mix)
11. Arnica Montana – Memories of the Seas (Café del Mar Mix)
12. Joke Society – Morphing Morning
13. Deeper & Pacific feat. Geanine Marque – Breeze
14. Oleomusic – Lienzo

=== 30 years of Music (2010) ===
- CD1
1. Clélia Félix – Magical Moments
2. Gary B – Without You
3. Deep Josh & José Rodriguez Feat. Josephine Sweet – Strangers in the Night
4. Luminous – Good to Be Out of the Rain
5. Toni Simonen – Parasailing
6. Cécile Bredie – Circles
7. Javier Esteve – Rainbow Over Black & White
8. Paco Fernández – Pez Volador
9. Digital Analog Band – Waiting 4 You
10. Ive Mendes – What We Have Now
11. Bright Sun Spirit – White Sand
12. La Caina – A Child Is Born
13. Elmara – Central Station Ny
14. Motif – Give It Away
15. Elimar & Beach Messiah – Better World
16. Coastline – Mediterranean
- CD2
1. Lunatic Soul – Time to Remember
2. Gary B – Esta Noche
3. AGP band – Bailando con la luna
4. Paco Fernández – Almendros Chill
5. Digital Analog Band – I Promise
6. Javier Esteve – Hungry Heart
7. Sol Eléctrico – Nothing
8. Elmara – Slow Train
9. Ypey – Somewhere Else
10. Nerio Poggi – Season of Love
11. Solaris Navis – When the Sun Goes Down
12. Wasaby Ink – All My Love
13. Atlan Chill – Volar
14. Steve Xavier – One World
15. Toni Simonen – Endless Sea

=== 35th Anniversary (2015) ===
- CD 1
1. Cagedbaby – Marmalade
2. Kid Loco – A Grand Love Theme
3. Quantic – The 5th Exotic
4. Caia – Le Telecabine
5. Tom Middleton – Astral Projection
6. Nightmares On Wax – Les Nuits
7. A Man Called Adam – All My Favourite People (Stay With Me)
8. Skanna – This Way
9. Beanfield – Charles
10. Fortunato & Montresor – Imagine (Imagination 2)
11. Jakatta – Strung Out
12. Jon Hopkins – Candles
13. M83 – In The Cold I'm Standing
- CD 2
1. The Amalgamation Of Soundz – Textures
2. Raze – Break 4 Love (Skunk Dub)
3. Kama Sutra – Sugar Steps
4. Stonebridge Feat. Therese – Put ‘em High (Claes Rosen Lounge Mix)
5. Sydenham & Ferrer – Sandcastles (Afterlife Remix)
6. G Club Pres. Banda Sonora – Guitarra G (Afterlife Remix)
7. Chymera – Umbrella (Beatless Mix)
8. Mike Monday – When The Rain Falls
9. Bent – I Love My Man
10. Coco & The Lovebomb – Sunset
11. Chicane – Already There
12. Bliss – When History Was Made
13. Penguin Cafe Orchestra – Coriolis
- CD 3
1. Amorphous Androgynous – Mountain Goat
2. Young American Primitive – Sunrise
3. Art Of Noise – Moments In Love (Beaten)
4. Autechre – Nine
5. Aphex Twin – Untitled 3
6. John Beltran – Gutaris Breeze
7. Moby – My Beautiful Blue Sky
8. Turah – Reishi
9. Ian O’Brien – Vagalume
10. Detroit Escalator Co. – The Inverted Man Falling
11. Wim Mertens – Struggle for pleasure
12. Constance Demby – Waltz Of Joy
13. Steven Halpern – The Light In Your Eyes
14. John Williams – Cavatina

== Spin–off Albums ==
The series has since expanded with a number of spin-off albums:

- Café del Mar Classic – Vols. 1 to 3
- Café del Mar Essential Feelings
- Café del Mar Vue Mer
- Café del Mar Terrace Mix
- Café del Mar Terrace Mix 2
- Café del 30 Anniversary
- Café del Mar Dubai mixed by Smokingroove
- Café del Mar Aria – Vols 1 to 3
