= Simplicity Two Thousand =

- The original Simplicity cover

Studio album by Afterlife
- Released: 11 September 2000
- Recorded: 1996–1999, 2000 (Remixes)
- Studio: Steven Miller's home studio, Cheshire, England
- Genre: Downtempo, Balearic beat
- Length: 68:48 (Disc 1); 61:55 (Disc 2)
- Label: Hed Kandi (HEDK013)
- Producer: Steven Miller

Afterlife chronology
Simplicity (1999)	Simplicity Two Thousand (2000)	Speck of Gold (2004)

Simplicity is an album by British electronic music producer Steven Miller, known professionally as Afterlife. It was first issued in September 1999, but was quickly withdrawn and re-released on 11 September 2000 as the expanded two-disc set Simplicity Two Thousand, which added remixes and bonus tracks.

== Style ==
The album is said to capture the "hidden alter ego" of the island Ibiza. Miller, a British downtempo producer, who was in this period best known for his appearances on the previous years' Café del Mar compilations, said he was "deeply affected" by the island's people and scenery when he visited and made the album as a reflection of his time there. The album includes influences of trip hop, flamenco, and lullaby. Travel writer Iain Stewart called the album "Balearic music of real substance" and highlighted Rachel Lloyd's "mellifluous" vocal contributions.

== Production ==
According to Miller, Lloyd created and recorded the vocals for the track "Breather" as improvised single-take singing. She recorded additional vocals over several recording sessions, as a "stream of vocal consciousness": without listening to the instrumental track before doing her takes. He further states that, for the 2000 rerelease, this track was reworked into a Bossa nova-style remix, with the addition of guitar and other live instruments—at the suggestion of an NRK employee, who then handled the additional studio work, and engineered the mix. "Breather 2000" was subsequently included on Café del Mar Volume 7.

== Release ==
According to the label Hed Kandi: "Simplicity was originally released in Sept 1999 but ... it was quickly withdrawn to be repacked and re-marketed to a wider audience."

== Reception ==
Professional ratings
Review scores
Source	Rating
AllMusic	4/5 stars

A reviewer for The Press praised vocalist Rachel Lloyd's performance, and gave the album four and a half stars. He wrote: "Not many acts who appear on [Café del Mar compilations] are capable of keeping it up over a whole album, let alone two, as in this case, but Lloyd and her cohorts manage it and with original material, too. In the book The Mojo Collection, the album was called a "gorgeous feat of melancholy" with all twelve songs flowing "seamlessly into a beautifully executed narrative".

== Track listing ==
Disc one
No.	Title	Version / Remix	Length
1.	"Dub In Ya Mind"	Blue Water Mix	5:49
2.	"Never Before"		5:37
3.	"Show You Something"		6:28
4.	"Cry"	Brown Bear Mix	7:34
5.	"5th & Avenida"		5:21
6.	"Deeper (Into Places)"		4:17
7.	"Borneo Is Burning"		5:51
8.	"Glide"		5:33
9.	"Breather"	Original Version	5:18
10.	"La Nina"		4:48
11.	"Blue Bar"		7:06
12.	"Cry"	Original Version	5:06

Disc two
No.	Title	Version / Remix	Length
1.	"Dub In Ya Mind"	The Insatiable Mix	4:37
2.	"Makes Me Feel"		6:03
3.	"Falling"		5:39
4.	"Show You Something"	Chris Coco Balearic Beats Mix	6:31
5.	"Lo Delta"		5:39
6.	"Breather 2000"	Arithunda Mix	6:04
7.	"Cry"	Sunset Dream Remix	9:19
8.	"Deeper (Into Places)"	Silk Spinner Remix	6:34
9.	"Cry"	Spoon Wizard Mix	6:26
10.	"Show You Something"	Ambient Mix	5:03
