= Miromusic =

Danish electronic music duo

Miro
- Origin: Farum, Denmark
- Genres: Trance, techno, house, chill-out
- Years active: 1990-present
- Labels: Coma Records, Effective Records, Hooj Choons, Cafe del Mar, Dance Opera
- Members: Mads Arp; Steen Thottrup

Miro is a Danish electronic music duo consisting of Steen Thottrup and Mads Arp. Active since 1990, the group is known for producing trance, progressive house, and chill-out music. They gained international recognition with the release of Pure Silk on Effective Records, which charted in the UK and was named Pete Tong’s “Essential New Tune” on BBC Radio 1. Miro has released music on prominent labels such as Hooj Choons and has contributed to influential compilations including Café del Mar, Chilled Euphoria, and Global Underground. Their work spans club tracks, remixes, and downtempo compositions, with performances at major venues like the famous Ministry of Sound in London.

== Biography ==
Miro debuted in 1991 with the single Energy / Mystery on Coma Records. Their international breakthrough came after relocating to London and releasing Pure Silk on Effective Records. The track reached No. 78 on the UK Singles Chart and No. 17 on the UK Dance Chart, and was selected as Pete Tong’s Essential New Tune on BBC Radio 1.

Their track Spaceman was released multiple times, including on Effective Records and Dance Opera (Benelux).

In 1996, Miro made their ambient debut on Café del Mar Volume 3 with the track Emotions of Paradise, compiled by Ibiza-based DJ José Padilla. The track has been licensed to over 30 chill-out compilations worldwide.

Following this, Miro became a regular contributor to chill-out compilations including Café del Mar, Buddha Bar, and Les Bains Douches, contributing to over ten volumes of the Café del Mar series.

Miro released the tracks Paradise and By Your Side on the UK label Hooj Choons, both of which appeared on Global Underground compilations and peaked at the official Dance Singles Charts at number 26 & 34.

In 1999, Miro’s Vocal Radio version of Greece 2000 by Three Drives was released on Hooj Choons and peaked at Number 12 on the official UK Top 40 chart.

In 2002, they produced a chill-out remix of Battleship Grey by Tiësto, featuring Kirsty Hawkshaw, released by Virgin Records. In 2004, they collaborated with ambient composer Roger Eno on the album Remote – Opening Doors.

Miro have performed at venues such as Ministry of Sound in London, Pumpehuset in Copenhagen, The Big Chill Live Festival, as well as numerous raves throughout Europe.

=== Aliases and Solo projects ===
In addition to their work as Miro, the duo has released music under various aliases, including:

- Colours
- Remote
- Orange

Solo Projects:

- Mads Arp has recorded as Raoul Express, Arpiction and as a solo artist on Black Hole Recordings.
- Steen Thottrup has recorded as Professional Losers, Conamore, Twotrups and as a solo artist.

== Discography ==
=== Albums ===
- 2025: The Remixes
- 2025: The Techno Years 92-96
- 2024: The Highlights
- 2004: Remote - The Big Chill 2004 Live
- 2004: Remote - Opening Doors

=== Singles & EPs ===
- 2025 Colours EP
- 2024 Millenium Sounds EP
- 2015 Paradise Remixes
- 2013 By Your Side 2013 Remixes
- 2006 Live It Now
- 2005 Freeze The Moment
- 2003 By Your Side Remixes Euphonic
- 2003 The One I Run To
- 2003 Spaceman Remixes
- 2002 By Your Side Remixes Lost Language
- 1999 By Your Side
- 1998 Paradise
- 1997 Orient Express
- 1996 Spaceman Remixes
- 1995 Metropolis
- 1994 Spaceman
- 1994 Tour De Trance
- 1994 Celebrate
- 1993 Pure Silk / El Salvador
- 1991 Energy / Mystery

=== Other aliases ===
- 2004 Hello Dreamer as Remote
- 2004 Postcard as Remote
- 2002 Another One as Colours
- 2001 Remember Me as Orange
- 2001 The Guitar Track Remixes as Colours
- 2000 The Guitar Track as Colours

=== Selective Remixes ===
- 2001 Battleship Grey by Tiesto & Kirsty Hawkshaw
- 2001 Peace by Saints & Sinners
- 1999 Greece 2000 by Three Drives
- 1995 Naked People by The Overlords
- 1994 La Luna by Moving Melodies

=== Selective Appearances ===
- 2022 Emotions of Paradise on Café del Mar Essentials
- 2017 Paradise on The Sound of Café del Mar
- 2017 Spaceman on La Rocca Club Classics
- 2016 By Your Side on Café del Mar Ibiza Classics
- 2014 Spaceman on Age of Love Volume One
- 2012 Holding On on The Very Best Of Café del Mar Music
- 2010 Emotions of Paradise on Café del Mar Volumen Tres Y Cuatro
- 2009 By Your Side on Chilled Euphoria - Ministry of Sound
- 2007 By Your Side on Gatecrasher Immortal - Ministry of Sound
- 2004 Hello Dreamer on Jockey Club Salinas
- 2004 The One I Run To on Sa Trincha Volume 3
- 2004 Holding On on Café del Mar Volumen Once 11
- 2004 Sunrise on Beach Bar Culture
- 2003 Reach Out on Altitude The Art of Chill - Platipus
- 2003 The One I Run To on Ministry of Sound Summer Guide 03
- 2003 Postcard on Café del Mar Volumen Diez 10
- 2003 The Cure on Ultra Chilled - Ultra Records
- 2003 The One I Run To on Global Underground 25 Toronto - Deep Dish
- 2002 By Your Side on Gatecrasher Experience
- 2002 Another One on Is Harry On The Boat
- 2002 The Guitar Track on Perfecto Presents: Dfuse
- 2002 The Cure on Café del Mar Volumen Nueve 9
- 2001 Stay Asleep on Café del Mar Dreams 2
- 2001 The Guitar Track on Pacha Ibiza 2001 - Dj Pippi
- 2001 The Guitar Track on MTV Ibiza 2001
- 2001 By Your Side on Deep & Chilled Euphoria
- 2000 Emotions of Paradise on Café del Mar Dreams
- 1999 By Your Side on Global Underground Prototype 2 - Seb Fontaine
- 1998 Paradise on Renaissance Presents
- 1998 Paradise on Global Underground 007 New York - Paul Oakenfold
- 1996 Emotions of Paradise on Les Baines Douches - Claude Challe
- 1996 Emotions of Paradise on Café del Mar Volumen Tres 3
- 1995 Spaceman on Trance Five - Rumour Records
- 1993 Pure Silk on Energy Rush Phase 4 - Dino
- 1993 Pure Silk on Fresh Dance 93 - Telstar
- 1992 Cocoon on Mermaid Tracks - Coma Records
- 1991 Energy on BreaksBass & Bleeps 3 - Rumour Records
