= Vargo =

Vargo may refer to:

- Bruce Vargo, United States Army personnel
- Dianna Vargo, American academic administrator
- Mark Vargo (special effects artist) (born 1954), American special effects artist
- Stephen Vargo, American academic
- Trina Vargo, American politician scientist
- Vargö, an island in Sweden (Vargo is an anglicized alternate spelling without diacritics)
- Vargo (band), a German electronic music duo
