= Leave the Door Open (disambiguation) =

"Leave the Door Open" is the 2021 debut single by Silk Sonic, a duo consisting of Bruno Mars and Anderson .Paak.

Leave the Door Open may also refer to:

- Leave the Door Open (album), by Joel Harrison and Anupam Shobhakar, 2013
- Leave the Door Open, a 2015 album by Steve Dalachinsky and Eighty Pound Pug
