= A Man Called Adam =

A Man Called Adam may refer to:

- A Man Called Adam (group), a British electronic music group
- A Man Called Adam (film), a 1966 American drama musical film
