= Ivan Tucakov =

Serbian musician (born 1978)

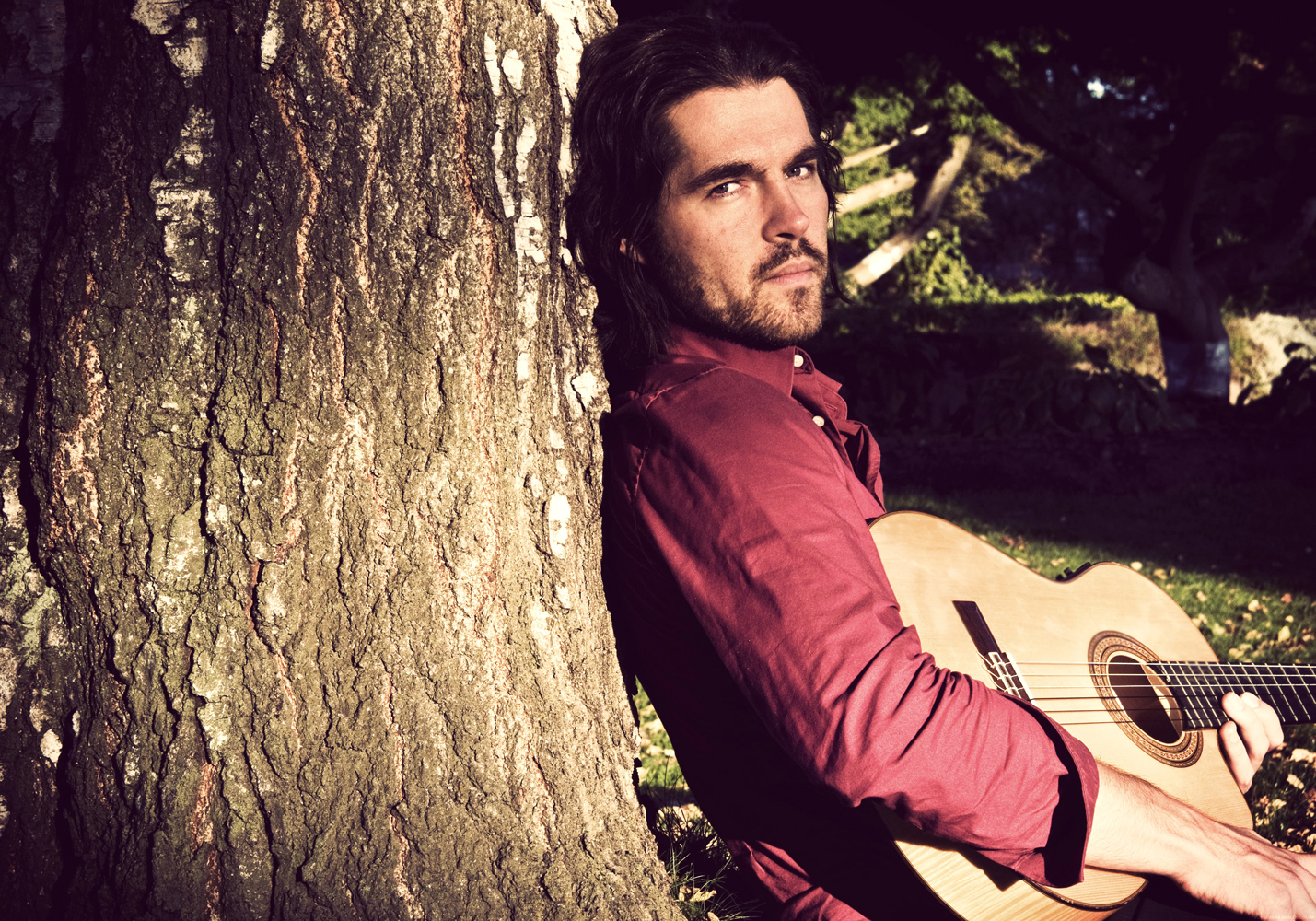
- Ivan Tucakov, 2011 Photo by: Mehtap Kızılırmak

Background information
- Born: 1978 (age 47–48); Belgrade
- Origin: Canada
- Years active: 2004–present
- Website: www.ivantucakov.com www.tamburarasa.com www.vinoandforte.com www.culturarasa.com

Ivan Tucakov production discography
- Studio albums: 8
- Internet albums: 1
- Live albums: 1
- Compilation albums: 2
- Soundtracks: 3

Ivan Tucakov (born 1978 in Belgrade) is a producer, composer and author currently living in Vancouver, British Columbia, Canada.

== Life ==
Tucakov, of Serbo-Croatian descent, spent the first eight years of his childhood in the plains of central Turkey, then moved to live in Serbia. He has travelled extensively around the world gaining exposure to various cultures, exploring the techniques of Balkan Music, Afro-Cuban jazz, Flamenco, Indian Classical Music, Cuban music, Persian Music, Fado, Roma music, and others.

Tucakov also graduated with an honours degree in Computer Science and Physics at the University of British Columbia, which led him down the path of authoring a number of books that explore novel ways of understanding the world.

=== Musical Projects ===
- In 2004, Tucakov formed the Tambura Rasa collective.

- In 2012 Ivan Tucakov and the classical pianist Oriana White created a world fusion duet called "Vino & Forte", classical on one side and Balkan-flamenco on the other.

=== Authored Works ===
- Mindful Connection Method (2010)

- Cultura Rasa (2019)

== Discography ==
=== Sunrise on a New World (2004) ===
Featuring: Delhi 2 Dublin's Tarun Nayar on tablas; Thomas Tumbach on violin.

1. Cinnabar
2. Plamen
3. Funky Bedouin
4. Isla Mujeres / Yuandao (featuring Chris Suen on Diao and Xia)
5. El Gharbi (featuring Aboubacar Camara - African singing)
6. Anadol
7. Hey Mister
8. Ningchen (featuring Chris Suen on Diao and Xia)
9. Makumba (featuring Aboubacar Camara - African singing)
10. Nada

=== Viaje (2006) ===
Featuring: Delhi 2 Dublin's Tarun Nayar on tablas.

1. Anadol (featuring Brian Poulsen on solo guitar)
2. Jovano Jovanke
3. Delirio (featuring David Sorroche with Flamenco singing)
4. Viaje (featuring Victor Chorobik on duduk and flutes)
5. TJango (featuring Dugg Schmidt on Bandoneon)
6. Ghazal (featuring Aditya Verma on Sarod)
7. Likeadazeickle (featuring Brian Poulsen on solo guitar)
8. Dulces Suenos (featuring Luis Gutierrez - Flamenco singing)
9. Mausim (featuring Victor Chorobik on duduk and flutes and Chris Suen on guzheng)
10. Party Song (featuring Brian Poulsen on solo guitar)

=== Kamanala (2008) ===
1. Gypsy Love (featuring Joseph 'Pepe' Danza on Percussion and Flute)
2. Tambura Pana
3. Bandido
4. Loved One
5. Ceo Svet (featuring Anupam Shobhakar on the Sarod)
6. Mujeres
7. Akşam (featuring Anupam Shobhakar on the Sarod)
8. Cintamani
9. Estrella (featuring Joseph 'Pepe' Danza on Percussion)
10. Hang On (featuring producer Chin Injeti - vocals)

=== Tambura Rasa Beats (2009) ===
A lounge electronica compilation of some of Tambura Rasa world fusion compositions from 2005-2009 (Includes Cafe del Mar's releases: Cinnabar Mix and Gypsy Love Mix). Tambura Rasa Beats was nominated for the Western Canadian Music Award 2010 World Recording of the Year.

1. Cinnabar Mix (Café del Mar XIII Mix)
2. Tambura Pana (Latin Dub Mix)
3. Isla Mujeres (Bossa Lounge Mix)
4. Mausim (Yoga Mix)
5. Ningchen (Tranquil Morning Mix)
6. Funky B (Desert Mirage Mix)
7. Ghazal (Indian Chill Mix)
8. Gypsy Love Mix (Café del Mar XVI Mix)

=== Adsum (2011) ===
Nominated for Western Canadian Music Awards 2011 Best World Recording. Featuring Michael Fraser on violin, Robin Layne on percussion, John Bews on bass, and Trevor Grant on drums.

1. Ardor Kadife (Baladi Buleria)
2. Miris Irisa
3. Se Smej
4. A Day With You
5. Oh! Belka
6. Vrcka
7. Soledad
8. Adsum
9. Lamento de Amistad (Siguirilla)
10. New World

=== In Concert (2012) ===
Nominated for Western Canadian Music Awards 2013 Best World Recording. Features the Black Dog String Quartet (Elyse Jacobson, Cameron Wilson, John Kastelic and Doug Gorkoff), Michael Fraser on violin, Colin Maskell on saxophone and flute, Kerry Galloway on bass, Elliot Polsky on drums, and Robin Layne on percussion.

1. Isla Mujeres (Live)
2. Türk Kahvesi (Live)
3. Ardor Kadife (Live)
4. Viaje (Live)
5. Ceo Svet (Live)
6. Loved One (Live)
7. Bandido (Live)
8. Miris Irisa (Live)
9. Mujeres (Live)
10. Lamento De Amistad (Live)
11. Adsum (Live)
12. Delirio (Live)
13. Anadol (Live)

=== Arribada (2014) ===
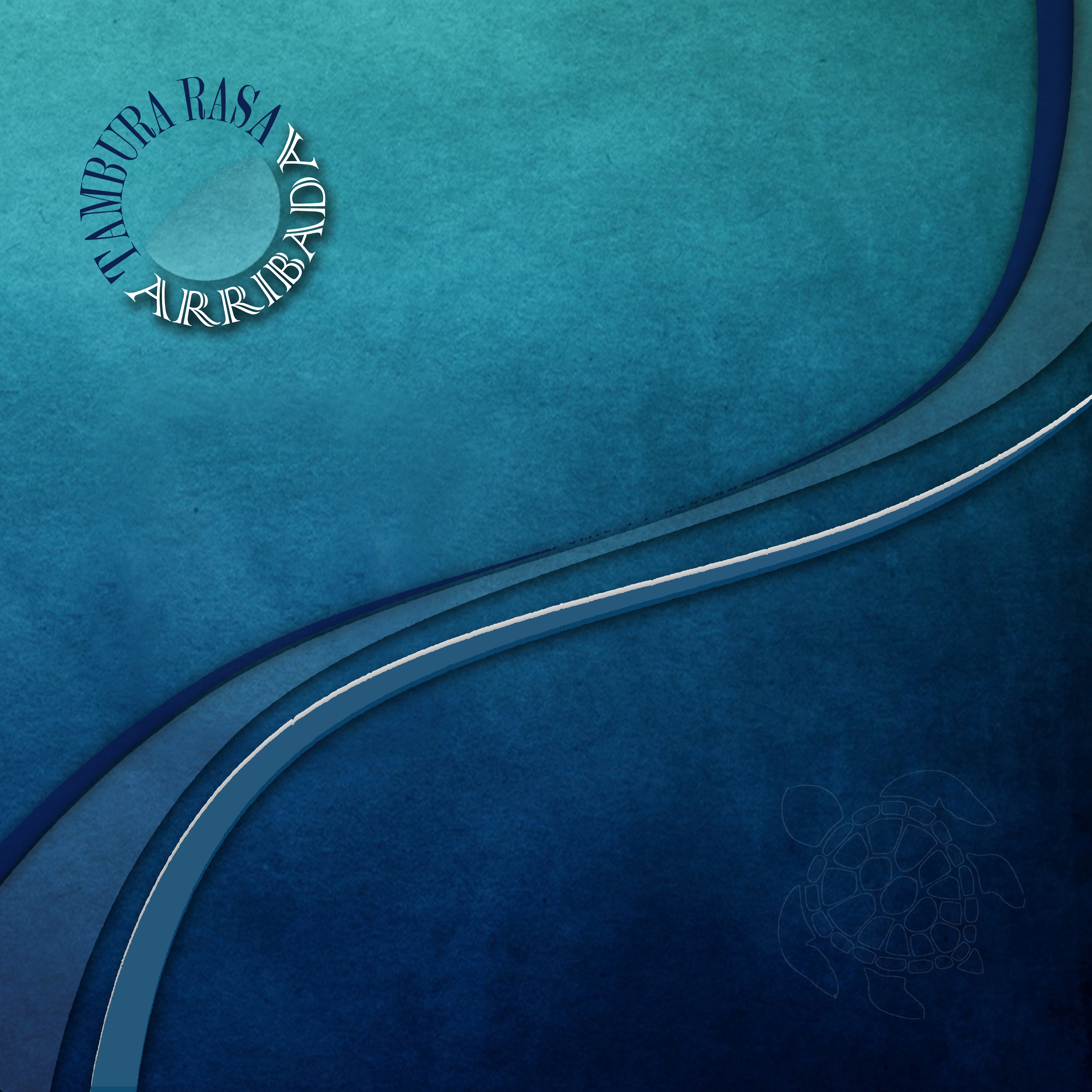
2014 Album Cover

Featuring the Black Dog String Quartet (Elyse Jacobson, Cameron Wilson, John Kastelic and Doug Gorkoff), Cameron Wilson on solo violin, Colin Maskell on bansuri, saxophone and flute, Kerry Galloway on bass, Randall Stoll on drums, and Robin Layne on percussion.

1. Shine On You Crazy Diamond (featuring Neelamjit Dhillon on tablas) - Pink Floyd cover
2. En la Vida (featuring Miguelito Valdez on vocals and trumpets)
3. Nada (guest vocalist: Maria Avila)
4. Türk Kahvesi (guest vocalist: Michael Antonakos)
5. Voz
6. Dulces Sueños (featuring Neelamjit Dhillon on tablas)
7. Ay Haiku (featuring Neelamjit Dhillon on tablas)
8. El Viento (guest vocalist: David Sorroche)
9. Arribada

=== Infinite ∞ (2021) ===
Featuring Ivan Tucakov on vocals and guitar, Emily Helsdon on violin, Soroush Shahres on viola, Oriana White on piano, Langston Raymond on trumpet, Robin Layne on percussion, JeanSe Le Doujet on bass & Randall Stoll on drums

Side A

1. Animae Īra 4:30
2. A Way 5:29
3. Told Ya! 4:37
4. Crystal Glass 3:29

Side B

1. Lemniscātus Anantya 4:02
2. Yume San 2:38
3. Dreams 5:09
4. Rêverie 5:52

=== Compilation Albums ===
- 2006 - "Cinnabar Mix" - Café del Mar Vol. 13. Tucakov's electronic mix of his song "Cinnabar" (from the first CD "Sunrise on a New World") was released on this compilation.
- 2009 - "Gypsy Love Mix" - Café del Mar Vol. 16. Tucakov's electronic mix of his song "Gypsy Love" (from the third CD "Kamanala") was released on this compilation.

=== Soundtracks ===
- 2004 - Golden Rush (documentary)
- 2005 - On the Bag (documentary)
- 2006 - Heartfelt Cafe (short movie)

== Authored Works ==
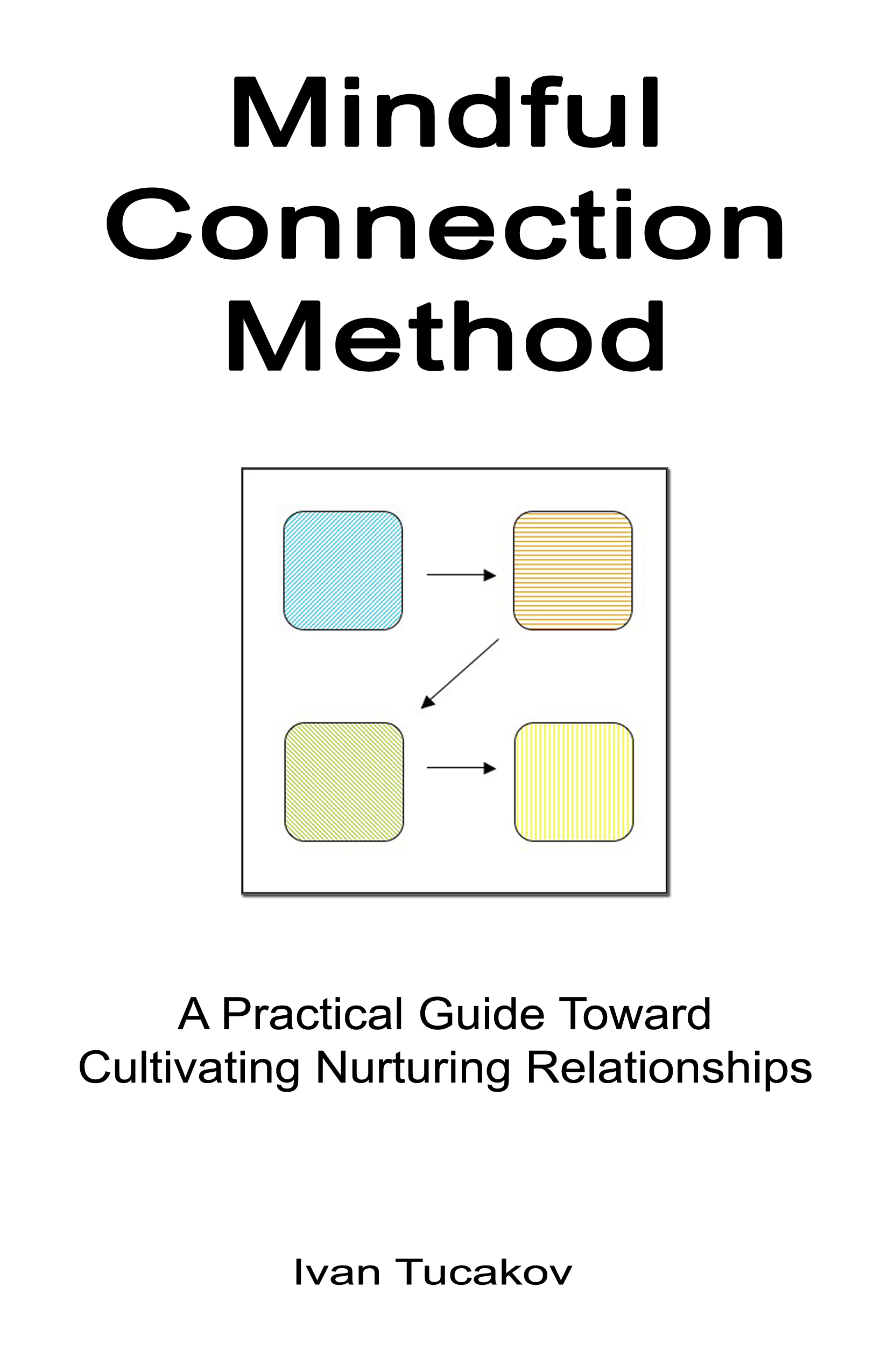
Ivan Tucakov - Mindful Connection Method

=== Mindful Connection Method (2010) ===
A Practical Guide Toward Cultivating Nurturing Relationships

In 2010 Ivan Tucakov released a book on social dynamics called The Mindful Connection Method, offering guidance in areas of personal growth, family dynamics, work settings, conflict resolution, counseling, education, community building, and social issues. In 2013, he released The Compass Within workbook, suggesting practical steps to breaking destructive, disconnecting habit loops and replacing them with restorative, connecting habits.

Tucakov maintains an active blog on related topics, runs discussion practice workshops and educational seminars, and offers private coaching through his organization, "The Compass Within".

ISBN 978-0-9865199-0-1

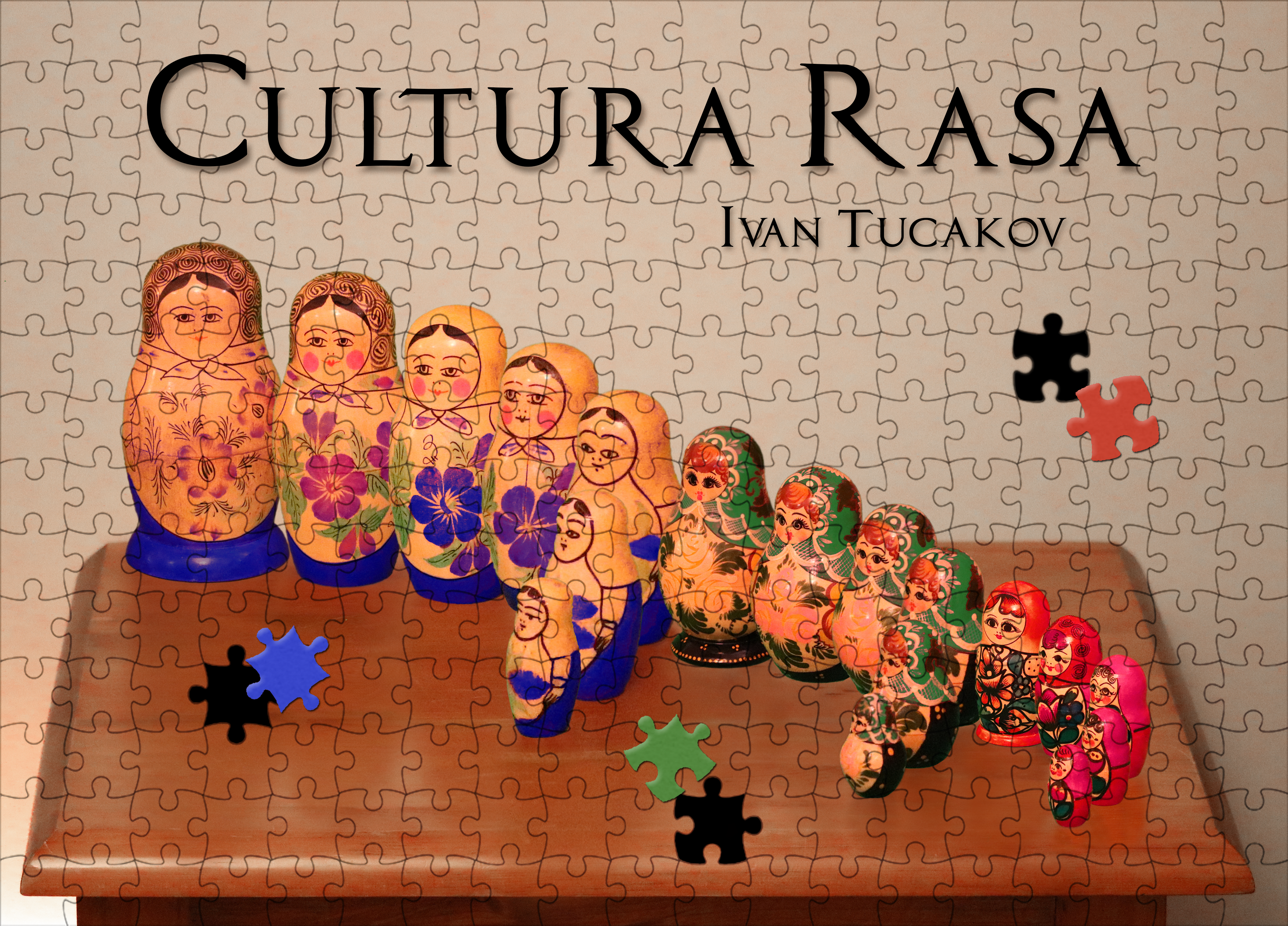
Cultura Rasa - Ivan Tucakov

=== Cultura Rasa (2019) ===
The Emergence and Replicative Nature of Socio-Cultural Societies

In 2019, after five years of study and research, Ivan Tucakov returns with a volume that explores the emergence and replicative nature of socio-cultural societies.

Cultura Rasa presents an integrated picture of all animal cultures, built from the bottom-up: starting from the world of atomic matter, over biological systems that they create, which further emerge into neural networks that ultimately build cultural systems. Cultura Rasa presents a dozen original hypotheses within the disciplines of science and philosophy, whilst also proposing a preliminary structure of the tree of culture.

Ivan’s intent with this primer is to create accuracy and consistency in concept definition, to offer a deeper understanding and tolerance of varying cultural worldviews.

ISBN 978-0-9865199-3-2
