= Anupam Shobhakar =

Indian musician

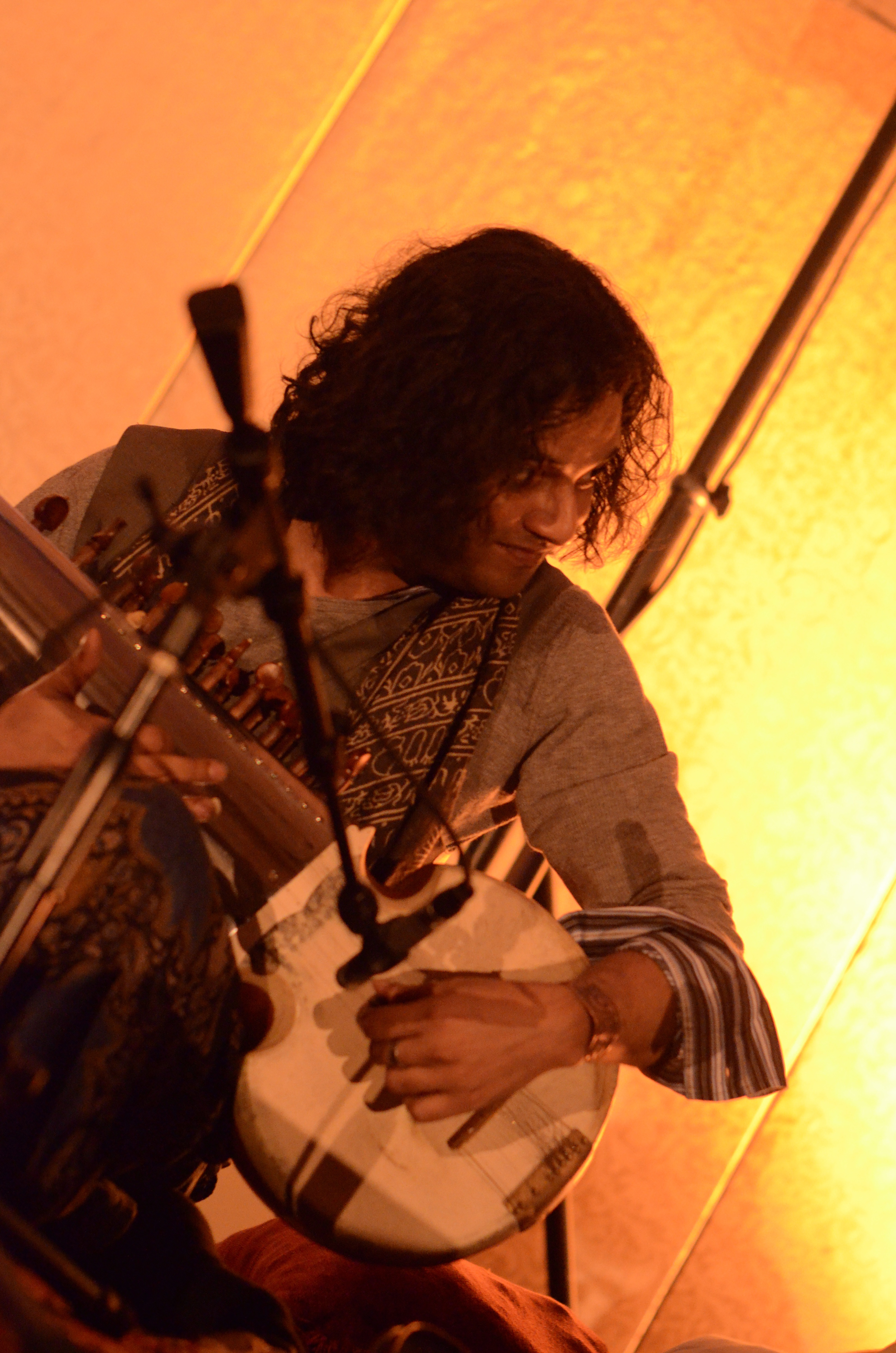
- Shobhakar playing the sarod

Background information
- Born: Anupam Shovakar
- Origin: Bombay, India
- Genres: Indian classical music, world fusion
- Occupations: Musician, composer, producer
- Instruments: Sarod, guitar
- Years active: 2002 – present
- Labels: Saregama, Times, Whirlwind
- Website: shobhakar.com

Anupam Shobhakar is an Indian musician, composer, instrumentalist, record producer, and classically trained sarodist currently living in Brooklyn, New York. He has released three world fusion albums, and one classical Indian music album. He has performed live around the world at various venues and for charitable causes. Shobhakar's track "Water" made it to the first round of the Grammy Awards.

== Early life ==
=== Musical influences ===
Shobhakar was born in the east Indian city of Kolkata (Calcutta), but was raised in India's financial capital city of Bombay. Although Shobhakar's parents are not musicians, they often played classical Indian records at home, which had an influence on Shobhakar. His grandfather, Shri Bhavani Shankar Shovakar, played sitar, tabla, and sang, hosting concerts at his residence.

Shobhakar's first brush with western music was listening to Led Zeppelin and Deep Purple, followed by Megadeth and Metallica. He was given a guitar, which he strung left-handed, and began practising, eventually forming a band named Dead Sea Scrolls, which played cover versions of songs by Megadeth, Joe Satriani, and Steve Vai. During this same time (before the age of thirteen), Shobhakar began experimenting with jazz and classical music.

=== Indian classical music and the sarod ===
In his early teens, Shobhakar began to listen to Indian classical music again – as he says, "What I was doing on the guitar was not enough to musically satisfy me. I heard a Shakti record...that re-ignited my interest in the deep melodic gravitas." Shobhakar experimented by crafting a fretless guitar but found that nothing could match the "microtonal subtleties of Indian Music" like the traditional sarod.

Shobhakar's first teacher was Suresh Vyas, who stressed practice and technical discipline. Shobhakar explains, "For three or four years it was only exercises – a lot of finger exercises, but no music. I got a little bit disillusioned, but that's okay: the philosophy behind it is, first you get your hands entirely ready, so that when the music comes to you, you don't have to worry about technique." The intense training process is known as "tayarri." He explains, "That word has been broadly translated as, like, 'technically great', but tayarri actually means 'to be ready'. To be ready when the creative thing comes to you, your fingers, your mind, your body, and your soul must be exactly in place for you to execute it."

Shobhakar met Ustad Aashish Khan briefly when he came to do a concert in Bombay and stayed at Shobhakar's apartment. Shobhakar states that he was "blown away by Khan's command over the sarod," and has been studying with him ever since. Shobhakar lists Khan, and his father, Ustad Allaudin Khan (guru to Ravi Shankar and Ali Akbar Khan), as his main playing style influences: "Slightly aggressive in approach, but never at the cost of the melodic charm."

== Musical career ==
Shobhakar was recognised for his talents as an Indian classical music performer by the Priyadarshni Academy, who awarded him the Best Young Artist Award. Shobhakar's current focus is world fusion and jazz fusion.

=== First album ===
Shobhakar recorded his first album Mysterious Awakening, in 2004. He handled every aspect of production on the record, including tracking the guitars with a "goose neck internet chat mic." Shobhakar describes the sound of the music on the album as "the best of both worlds." He explains, "Most Indian musicians do not understand harmony as it's not a part of the musical system — it's a melodic and rhythmic tradition — whereas a lot of western music is based on harmony." The album was released by Saregama.

=== World fusion ===
Shobhakar's album was his first major contribution to world fusion, something he feels very passionately about. He says, "Apart from being a traditional concert sarodist, I want to really explore world music, and I've been wanting to do that for a while. I've been pretty much producing on my own: making all the music, adding all the MIDI instrumentation in my studio at home. But here it's better, because I can meet a lot of different musicians, a lot of different, diverse people."

Shobhakar released a subsequent world fusion album, Wine of the Mystic in 2005. In 2009, he released an Indian classical album, Dream Theory.

In 2013, Shobhakar and American guitarist Joel Harrison released Leave the Door Open (Whirlwind Recordings).

=== International performer ===
Shobhakar has toured internationally, playing at major music festivals such as Canada's Vancouver Folk Festival, MTV's Independence Rock Festival in India, Oman's Muscat Festival, and Italy's Roma Rock. Shobhakar has also dedicated his talents to charitable events such as YWCA India's Concert for Peace, raising money for the survivors of the Gujarat earthquake.

Shobhakar has collaborated and played with musicians from all over the globe, including Joel Harrison, Dan Weiss, World Fusion Orchestra, Alessandro Gandola, Ivan Tucakov, Gordon Gridna, Heather Schmid, Rich Balmer, Juan de Marias, Joel Harrison.

== Awards and recognition ==
- Received title, “Surmani” (Jewel of Melody), awarded by Sursingar Samsad
- Felicitated by the Indian Armed Forces
- Awarded "Best Young Artist" by Priyadarshni Academy

== Major concert performances ==
=== International ===
Year	Festival Name	Place
2007	Bengali New Year Festival	Canada
2007	Delhi Nights Festival	Canada
2007	Mela Festival	Canada
2007	Jerrico Beach Music Festival	Canada
2007	Chinese New Year Festival	Canada
2007	Canada Day Festival	Canada
2007	Komasket Music Festival	Komasket, Canada
2007	Vancouver Folk Festival	Canada
2008	Roma Rock	Italy
2008	Muscat Festival	Saudi Arabia
2009	Sangati Center (Indian Classical Music Art House)	San Francisco, USA
2010	Komasket Music Festival	Komasket, Canada
2010	Phoenix Symphony Hall	Phoenix, USA
2010	Hiroshima Memorial Day	Phoenix, USA
2010	World Refugee Day	Phoenix, USA
2010	Phoenix Art Museum	Phoenix, USA
2010	World Music Festival	Gilbert, USA
2010	Skin and Steel Debut	New York City
2010	New York Guitar Festival	New York City
2010	Komasket Music Festival	Vernon, Canada
2010	3D Festival of Music	Prescott
2011	Indian/Persian Fusion Concert	Phoenix, USA
2011	Reese Auditorium	Columbus, USA
2011	World Music Museum	Phoenix, USA
2011	Canada Day Festival	Vancouver, Canada

=== Domestic (India) ===
Year	Festival Name
1996	MTV Independence Rock Festival
2002	Ms. Kerala Beauty Pageant
2003	Priyadarshani
2004	Concert for Peace
2006	Mehli Mehta Foundation Festival
2008	Brahma Kumaris Festival
2008	Whistling Woods Student Convention
2008	Young String Masters (Kala Ghoda Music Festival)
2008	Malhar Festival
2008	Sur Singar Samsad Festival
2009	Haridas Samelan
2010	Alternative Art Festival

=== Voluntary work ===
- Concert for Peace by YWCA – After Gujarat earthquake, India, 2008.
- Designed the Module to Teach Underprivileged Tribal Children in India, 2008.
