= Digby Jones (musician) =

British musician and producer

Digby Jones is a British musician and producer. He has written music which has appeared on albums such as Cafe Del Mar Vol.8 and Cafe Del Mar Vol 11, as well as in US TV shows such as The OC and ER, and commercials for companies such as Sony PlayStation, Banana Republic and British Airways. His music is mainly jazzy and funky, but he also produces other styles.

He is also the founder of Sublime Music in London, which producers and publishes music from other artists around the world. The company has music placed in popular films such as Tropic Thunder, trailers such as Madagascar, US TV shows including CSI, Grey's Anatomy, Nip Tuck, Without A Trace, as well as commercials for clients such as Microsoft, Gap, Kenco, P&O, Chevrolet, E&J Gallo and Kia.
