= Inusa Dawuda =

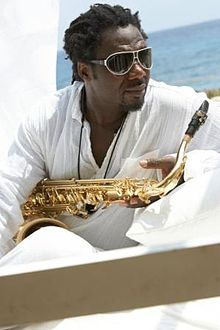
- Inusa Dawuda

Background information
- Also known as: Black Pharaoh
- Born: Inusa Dawuda; 12 August 1970 (age 56); Accra, Ghana
- Genres: Dance, house, reggae, chillout, lounge
- Occupations: Singer, saxophonist
- Instruments: Saxophone, percussion
- Years active: 1994–present
- Label: Kingdom of Music
- Website: www.inusagroove.com

Inusa Dawuda is an Afro-German musician, singer, record producer, and percussionist.

== Early life ==
Inusa Dawuda was born in Accra, Ghana, and as a teenager he moved with his parents to Hamburg, Germany. Inusa learned to play the saxophone during his youth, and he was also actively involved in sports. During the early 1990s he was a multiple boxing champion in Hamburg in the light heavyweight division.

The first successes in the field of music came to Inusa in the mid 1990s, when he traveled and played with several bands, playing cover versions of favorite hits from James Brown to Bob Marley. His primary musical influences include Manu Dibango, Fela Kuti, and Grover Washington, Jr.

== Career highlights ==
Inusa eventually embarked on a solo career embracing House music as his preferred performance genre. In 2006, he recorded the club single, Morning Light, with its Chillout version selling a million copies in the world-famous Café del Mar collection (volume 9).

From 2006 to 2010 Inusa recorded his most popular tracks Rumours (Digi Digi), Rub-A-Dub Girl, Down Down Down, and We Want More.

Inusa's track, "I Don't Know" (with Astero) was included on the album, VA Mega Dance Party: Hits of the Year, 2011 (Dance, Club category).

In 2012, the U.S.-based company, Hip Video Promotions, is officially promoting Inusa's summer hit, "Satisfaction" for nationwide exposure and rotation.

== Career accomplishments ==
Inusa is a collaborative artist, having enjoyed collaborations and support for his recordings from some of the biggest House giants like Erick Morillo, Paul Oakenfold, and radio rotations worldwide.

For 2009–10, Inusa was acknowledged as "Russia's Most Successful Foreign Artist", where to-date his single Rumours (Digi Digi) has received an excess of over a million radio plays, beating a stream of fellow foreign artists in a category that included Lady Gaga and David Guetta.

Inusa Dawuda's work is released on recording labels from BMG to Universal Music, Pacha Recordings, Tiger Records-Kontor Records, Hed Kandi and Kingdom of Music. He performs primarily in Germany, Russia, Turkey, Austria, Ukraine, Poland, Albania and other Scandinavian countries. Inusa's music is also renowned in other countries like Croatia, Italy, France and the UK, where his tracks often appear in playlists and club charts.

His 2011 releases I Don't Know, Now or Never and Walking on Sunshine continue to be popular tunes across the club and video scene. Dawuda's 2012 release, "Let's Do It" was a collaborative release from the UK label, Champion Records. His summer 2012 release, Satisfaction, was in collaboration with Khetama and EES.

Inusa Dawuda has also recorded in the lounge and chillout genres with some of his house tracks like Morning Light and You Are covered to cross-over as ballads. Lounge instrumentals like Reflections, Waterfalls, Nubian Memories, and African Nights, showcase Inusa's work as a vocalist, saxophonist, percussionist, and performer.

Inusa's single, "You Belong to the City (Niels Van Gogh Dub Mix)" (with Choc Choc Zoo), appears on the Best of Dance Music 2012 album.

For early 2013, Dawuda released "Hey Mr. DJ" which became a European hit, while his 2011 album "I Feel Beautiful" gained renewed recognition in the United States.

On 20 May 2013, Inusa's track, "Disco Flight", a collaboration with renowned House DJs Max Creative and DJ Beavis, reached the No. 2 slot on the Kings of Spins Top 20 club tracks list.

== Appearances ==
Inusa was a guest performer at the Gala Show of the Queen of Ukraine Pageant in 2010.

In 2011, Inusa appeared in Nigar Jamal's debut video, "Crush on You."

== Personal life ==
Inusa Dawuda currently resides in Hamburg, Germany.

== Discography – House / Dance / Reggae / Afro / ==
Track	Year	Collaborator	Label
"Disco Flight"	2013	Max Creative & DJ Beavis feat. Inusa Dawuda	Kingdom of Music
"Hey Mr. DJ"	2013	Inusa Dawuda & Violet Masters	Kingdom of Music
"In Music"	2012	Inusa Dawuda feat. Violet Masters	Kingdom of Music
"Let's Do It"	2012	Mr. Groove & Vergas feat.	ChampionRecordsUK
"Satisfaction"	2012	Khetama feat. EES	Kingdom of Music
"What's Wrong"	2012	Bryan Bax	Kingdom of Music
"You Belong to the City"	2012	Choc Choc Zoo	Need4Music
"Walking on Sunshine"	2011	Magnetix Project	Kingdom of Music
"You Are"	2011	DJ STJ	Kingdom of Music
"I Don't Know"	2011	Astero	Kingdom of Records
"All I Want"	2011	Impact	Kingdom of Music
"I Feel Beautiful"	2011	Various	Kingdom of Music
"Now or Never"	2011	DJ Salah	GaGa Records
"I Want Your Sax"	2011	Inusa Dawuda	F & S Records
"We Want More"	2010	DJ Chick	Kingdom of Music
"She Danced"	2010	DJ Chick	Pacha Recordings
"Believe"	2010	Inusa Dawuda.	Difruta Music
"Deep Down"	2010	Chris Montana Project feat.	S2G
"Down Down Down"	2009	No Tone feat.	Molto Records' Records
"Believe"	2009	Inusa Dawuda.	Hed Kandi
"If You Believe"	2009	Slin Project feat.	Join Hands Records
"Rub-A-Dub Girl"	2008	Whizzkids feat.	Kontor Records / Tiger Records
"Going Back to My Roots"	2008	Big World & Denise The Menace feat	SubliminalRecords
"Children of the Night"	2008	Sebastian courtier feat.	Molto Records
"Life Is Love"	2007	No Tone feat.	Molto Records' Records
"Rumours (Digi Digi)"	2006	Whizzkids	Kontor Records / Tiger Records
"Dance 4 Your Life"	2005	Jay feat.	Attractive
"Get Up (And Rock Da House)"	2004	Rhythm Divine Project feat.	Royal Flush Records
"Morning Light"	2001	Swen G feat.	BMG / Clubland

== Discography – lounge / chillout ==
Album	Year	Track	Featured Collaboration
n/a	2010	Morning Light with Mr. Swen G	The Best Songs of Ibiza, 1 (2010)
"DayDreams" (re-released 2011)	2009	Daydreams	
	2009	Reflections	
	2009	Autumn Winds	
	2009	Waterfalls	
	2009	Questions	
	2009	Runaway Horses	
	2009	On the Beach	
	2009	African Nights	
"Global Player"	2008	Making Love	
	2008	Dreamily	
	2008	You Are The Only One	
	2008	Global Player	
	2008	Space Child's Lullaby	
	2008	Nubian Memories	
n/a	2006	Life Train (Right in a Train)	Ibiza Chill Sensation, Vol. 1

See: Inusa Dawuda for complete discography.
