= Cardinal Zen (musician) =

Filipino musician

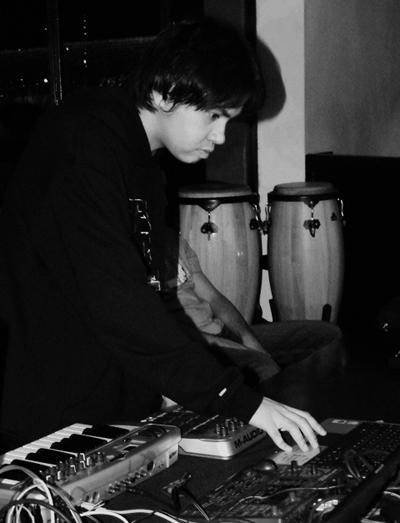

Background information
- Birth name: Ernest Jan Vincent Muñoz
- Also known as: Cardinal Zen; Makkina; Jv Munoz
- Born: Philippines
- Genres: Electronica, trip hop, downtempo, deep house, minimal techno
- Years active: 2002–present
- Labels: Café Del Mar Music, QED Records, Adope Recordings, Drizzly Music, Transcode Recordings

Cardinal Zen is a music producer based in France. He was part of the Café del Mar roster of artists and the founder of Transcode Recordings. He was born in San Fernando, Pampanga, Philippines.

== Biography ==
Cardinal Zen is one of the core members of the group of collective artists known as Electronica Manila. He is also one of the earlier pioneers of drum and bass in the Philippines under the names Makkina and Loop Theory. He cites Alias & Tarsier, DJ Krush, Aromabar, Mandalay, Mono, Massive Attack, Prefuse 73, and Enigma among his favorite artists.

== Discography ==
=== Albums ===
- Floppy Pillows EP (May 2005, QED Records)
1. Deep Within
2. I Dream of Hue
3. Wishing Well
- Summer Solstice (February 2013, Drizzly Music Gmbh)
1. Summer Solstice
2. Bent and Broken
3. Far from Home (Cafe Del Mar Dreams Vol.4 Edit)
4. Rain and Snow
5. Spider Dance
6. Warmth
7. Winter Sonnet
8. Midnite Sky
9. Subway Graffiti
10. Summoning the Winds
11. Wishing Well (Bonus Track)
12. Up Above and Down Below
13. Yukishiro (A Glimpse of Heaven)
14. Fast Like Bullets
15. Continuous Lounge Mix By Smooth Deluxe (feat. Smooth Deluxe) [60 Minutes Full of Pleasure]
- Winter in Paris EP (December 2014, Transcode Recordings)[3]
1. Winter in Paris (5:48)
- Tangerine Sunset EP (June 2015, Transcode Recordings)[4]
1. Tangerine Sunset (3:39)

=== Compilations ===
- Café Del Mar Dreams 4 (Various Artists) / (November 2006, Café Del Mar Music)[5]
- LaBoracay 2015 (Various Artists) / (April 2015, ToneDef Beats)[6]

=== Remixes ===
- Aromabar – Winter Pageant (Cardinal Zen Dreamy Remix)
- Garbage – Milk (Cardinal Zen Smoothie Remix)
- Sparkee – Inversion feat. Hazel Mae (Cardinal Zen Remix)
