= Yosi Horikawa =

Japanese musician and sound designer

Yosi Horikawa is a Japanese musician and sound designer. He is characterized by making music with nature sounds. Horikawa has released several EPs and two albums with music labels Eklektic Records, First Word Records, and Borrowed Scenery.

== Career ==
Yosi Horikawa grew up in Osaka in a family little involved in music. At the age of 12, he was interested in making music, but he did not have musical instruments. He sought things that sounded good around him, such as rice boxes, soup stock bags, and chopsticks, and he recorded them with home Tape decks. Horikawa's main influences were new jack swing, West Coast Hip-Hop, Pete Rock, Teddy Riley, and DJ Premier. He moved to Tokyo at 18 to study architecture and acoustics at a university.

His first EP, Touch, was released on French label Eklektic Records. In 2011, he contributed the track "Passion" to the Nihon Kizuna compilation for tsunami relief. In 2011, he participated in Red Bull Music Academy Madrid. In 2012, he launched the EP Wandering from London's First Word Records. In 2013, he launched its first album Vapor, considered by Fact Magazine and Japan Times as one of the Best Albums of 2013.

In May 2019 Horikawa and Daisuke Tanabe founded their own label, Borrowed Scenery. Horikawa would go on to release Spaces under the new Borrowed Scenery label.

In September 2025, Horikawa released the album Impulse.

=== Discography ===
EPs and Albums
Title	Release date	Label	Format
Touch	5 April 2010	Eklektik Records	EP, CD
Wandering	18 June 2012	First Word Records	EP
Vapor	24 June 2013	First Word Records	Album, CD, LP
Spaces	31 May 2019	Borrowed Scenery	Album, CD, LP
Impulse	26 September 2025	Borrowed Scenery	Album, CD, LP
