= José Padilla (DJ) =

Spanish DJ (1955–2020)

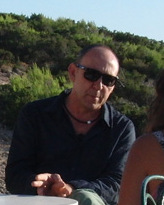
- José Padilla, Ibiza, July 2011

Background information
- Born: 4 December 1955; Barcelona, Spain
- Died: 18 October 2020 (aged 64) Ibiza, Spain
- Genres: Chill-out, easy listening, ambient, balearic
- Occupations: DJ, Producer
- Instruments: Synthesizer, drum machine, equalizer
- Years active: 1978–2020
- Labels: Café del Mar, Mercury Records
- Website: web.archive.org/web/20200925203446/https://www.josepadillaibz.com/

José María Padilla Requena (4 December 1955 – 18 October 2020) was a Spanish disc jockey and producer of ambient music, best known for his work as DJ in the Café del Mar bar on the island of Ibiza.

== Career ==
Born in Barcelona, Spain, Padilla moved to Ibiza in 1975. He took up the DJ residency at Café del Mar in 1991, after several years of selling his mixtapes to the venue. In 1994, he compiled the first Cafe del Mar album for the London-based React label, later claiming to have gone door-to-door in London looking for a record deal after selling 100 mixtapes a day. The series is now in its 25th volume and has spun off several related compilations, as well as leading to the creation of the bar's own eponymous label. Padilla selected tracks for the first six, as well as the 20th-anniversary commemorative release.

While several tracks of Padilla's appeared in his various compilations, it was not until 1998 that he released his first album, Souvenir, on Mercury Records label. The CD featured collaborations with several chill-out musicians, including Lenny Ibizarre and Paco Fernández. His second album, Navigator, was released in 2001. The album received a Latin Grammy nomination for Best Instrumental Album.

Padilla was no longer the resident DJ at Café del Mar, but toured around the world. However, in November 2007 a new compilation series called Bella Musica, unrelated to Café del Mar, was released.

In 2011, the new CD compilation "Here Comes the Sunset" (Volume 4) came out and after many years Padilla has been connected to another beach, this time in Italy, Fregene.

In 2015, Padilla made his new album So Many Colours available for streaming through Resident Advisor, before general release on International Feel. He later released the album Binary Sound.

Padilla returned to BBC Radio 1's Essential Mix decks in mid August 2015 for the first time in 20 years, with an eclectic two-hour "Masters" set.

Padilla revealed in July 2020 that he had been diagnosed with colorectal cancer at the age of 64.

Padilla died in Ibiza, Spain on 18 October 2020 at the age of 64, after suffering from colon cancer.

== Discography ==
Below are the albums compiled in part by José Padilla:

Year	Title
1993	Café del Mar, Vol 1
1994	Café del Mar, Vol 2
1995	Café del Mar, Vol 3
1996	Café del Mar, Vol 4
1997	Café del Mar, Vol 5
1998	Souvenir
1999	Café del Mar, Vol 6
2001	Navigator
2002	Navigator (Special Ed.)
2002	El Sueño de Ibiza
2005	Man Ray, Vol 4
2006	Café Solo
2007	Café Solo, Vol 2
2009	Café Mambo Ibiza 09
2010	Ibiza Classic Sunset
2010	Here comes the sunset vol.4- Singita, miracle beach
2012	Blue Note Beach Classics - presented by José Padilla
2015	So Many Colours
2017	Jose Padilla's House Party
