= Leave the Door Open (album) =

Studio album by Joel Harrison, Anupam Shobhakar
- Released: 10 March 2014
- Recorded: 28 December 2012
- Genre: Jazz
- Length: 59:04
- Label: Whirlwind Recordings
- Producer: Joel Harrison, Anupam Shobhakar

Leave the Door Open is an album by American jazz guitarist Joel Harrison and North Indian sarod player Anupam Shobhakar. It was released on 10 March 2014 on Whirlwind Recordings.

== Reception ==
Professional ratings
Review scores
Source	Rating
All About Jazz	4.5/5 stars
All About Jazz	4.5/5 stars
The Irish Times	4/5 stars
The Jazz Mann	3.5/5 stars

In a review for Jazz Times, Britt Robson wrote: "Harrison exhibits uncommon curiosity and endurance in his search for different ways to make his music beautiful and visceral... It is not often that 'world music fusion' is spelled out more explicitly or enjoyably than on the nine-song program for Leave the Door Open."

John Kelman of All About Jazz called the album "a heady brew that doesn't so much find a meeting point where East and West meet as it does blow the door open between the two, allowing the music to seamlessly ebb and flow from and towards both sides, creating something that's the sum total of both but equally reverent to their individual touchstones." AAJ's Chris M. Slawecki stated: "Leave the Door Open is more than evocative and expertly played music: It heralds the emerging age of global world jazz and the attendant possibilities with which it comes."

Writing for The Irish Times, Cormac Larkin noted that the album "sounds like an exploration of the deepest roots of all guitar-like instruments," and commented: "Harrison isn't too fond of categories. Jazz may be at the root of his musical language, but the tales he spins with it embrace American folk and country, traditional African, rock and popular music in ways that connect with their origins while sounding utterly new-fangled."

The Jazz Mann's Ian Mann remarked: "This is not simply a case of the 'world' musician acting as a guest soloist and basically 'doing what he always does' but in a jazz context, often as a kind of all star jam. Instead the co-leaders have worked together extensively to create a more integrated approach with each one buying into and learning from the others' culture... the music works brilliantly with Harrison and Shobhakar creating a convincing and beguiling cultural hybrid."

== Track listing ==
1. "The Translator" – 9:50
2. "Leave the Door Open" – 7:03
3. "Madhuvanti" – 8:04
4. "Multiplicity" – 11:26
5. "Spoonful" – 6:19
6. "Kemne Avul" – 3:17
7. "Turning World" – 3:23
8. "Devil Mountain Blues" – 3:47
9. "Deep River" – 5:47

== Personnel ==
- Joel Harrison – electric, national steel, acoustic and baritone guitars
- Anupam Shobhakar – sarode
- Gary Versace – piano, B3 organ and accordion
- Hans Glawischnig – double and electric bass
- Dan Weiss – drums and tabla
- David Binney – alto saxophone
- Todd Isler – percussion
- Bonnie Chakraborty – voice
- Chandrashekar Vase – voice
