= Café del Mar Aria =

Compilation album by Café del Mar

Compilation album by Paul Schwartz
- Released: 1997, 1999, 2005
- Genre: Ambient
- Label: Astor Place
- Producer: Paul Schwartz

Café del Mar Aria is a CD compilation series that combines chill-out music with opera arias, thereby expanding the existing Café del Mar series. The Café del Mar concept originated from the "sunset bar" with the same name in Sant Antoni de Portmany on the Mediterranean island of Ibiza. Café del Mar Aria is produced by Paul Schwartz.

== Aria Volume 1, 1997 ==
1. "Willow" (from Verdi's Otello)
2. "Un Bel Di" (from Puccini's Madama Butterfly)
3. "Secret Tear" (from Donizetti's L'elisir d'amore)
4. "Dido" (from Purcell's Dido and Aeneas)
5. "Pace Pace" (from Verdi's La forza del destino)
6. "Pamina Blue" (from Mozart's The Magic Flute)
7. "Habanera" (from Bizet's Carmen)
8. "Home" (from Verdi's Nabucco)

== Aria Volume 2, 1999 – New Horizon ==
1. "Arianna" (from Monteverdi's L'Arianna)
2. "Ebben" (from Catalani's La Wally)
3. "Addio" (from Verdi's La traviata)
4. "Horizon" (Paul Schwartz)
5. "Barcarolle" (from Offenbach's The Tales of Hoffmann)
6. "Cantilena" (Paul Schwartz)
7. "Sviraj (Lullabye)" (Clair Marlo, Paul Schwartz)
8. "Interlude" (Paul Schwartz)
9. "Pavane" (Fauré)
10. "Ave Maria" (Caccini's "Ave Maria")
11. "Leiermann" (from Schubert's Winterreise)
12. "Lullabye (Sviraj)" (Clair Marlo, Paul Schwartz)

== Aria Volume 3, 2004 – Metamorphosis ==
1. "Ombra mai fu" (from Handel's Serse)
2. "Furioso" (Sarabande by Handel)
3. "Sogno" (from Puccini's La rondine)
4. "Metamorphosis 2 – Danae" (Paul Schwartz)
5. "Ballo" (from Verdi's Un ballo in maschera)
6. "Interlude" (Paul Schwartz)
7. "Amami" (from Verdi's La traviata)
8. "Lascia" (from Handel's Rinaldo)
9. "Farewell" (from Puccini's Madama Butterfly)
10. "Metamorphosis 3 – Cyane" (Paul Schwartz)
11. "Ascension" (from Monteverdi's L'incoronazione di Poppea)
12. "Metamorphosis 1 – Arachne" (Paul Schwartz)
13. "Furioso (Instrumental Mix)" (Sarabande by Handel)
14. "Ombra (Chilled Mix)" (from Handel's Serse)
