= Vargo (band) =

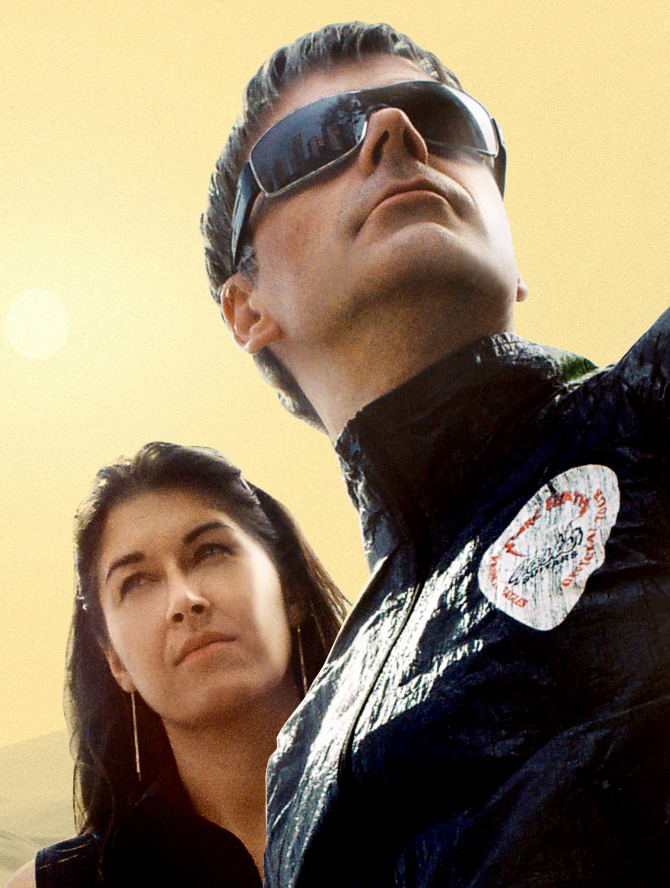

Background information
- Origin: Germany
- Genres: Electronica; Chill out Ambient music
- Years active: 2000–present
- Label: Ambient Domain
- Members: Ansgar Üffink
- Past members: Stephanie Hundertmark
- Website: vargoworld.com

Vargo is an electronic music band composed of producer Ansgar Üffink and vocalist Stephanie Hundertmark. The success of Vargo's 2001 single "Get Back to Serenity", released on several compilations, enabled the duo to produce their 2004 album, Beauty.

Vargo is associated with the Café del Mar, and was the first German act to be included in its compilations. Vargo's music has been included on over 50 compilations.

In 2014, Stefanie Hundertmark left the band. Vargo focused on DJing & initiated a new radio show called LOST IN MUSIC on Planet Radio.
