= Foundland =

2009 art collective by Ghalia Elsrakbi and Lauren Alexander

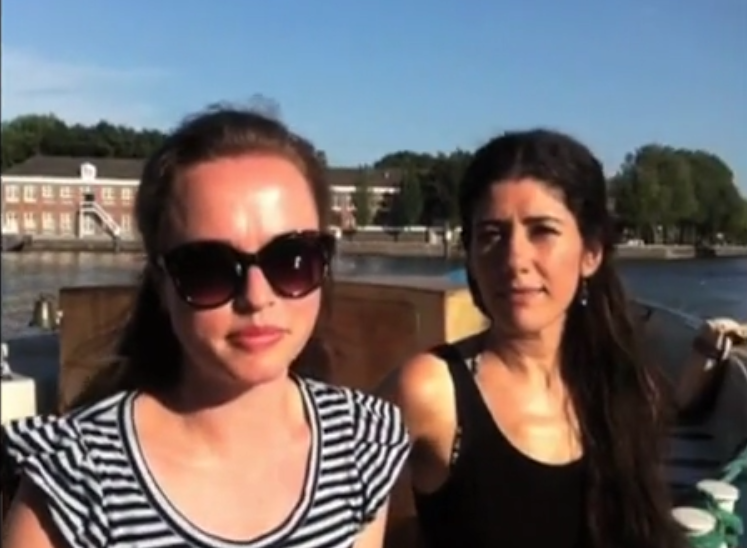
Lauren Alexander and Ghalia Elsrakbi

Foundland is an art collective founded in 2009 in Amsterdam by Syrian artist Ghalia Elsrakbi and South African artist, Lauren Alexander. The name Foundland was chosen by the two artists because it suggests using found objects and art, but also that it's about "reclaiming." The collective is based in Cairo and Amsterdam.

== About ==
Elsrakbi was born in Damascus in 1978 and lived in Syria until 2000. She studied in the Netherlands where she attended the Sandberg Institute in Amsterdam, graduating in 2009. Here she met South African artist, Lauren Alexander, and together they created the art group, Foundland. In 2007 she returned to Damascus and visited regularly until "it became too dangerous." She eventually moved to Cairo in 2012.

Alexander was born Cape Town in 1983. She has a bachelor's degree in graphic design from the University of Stellenbosch and a Masters in Design from the Sandberg Institute.

In 2015, Foundland was included on the shortlist for the Prix de Rome.

== Work ==
Elsrakbi feels that it is important to live in the Middle East so that she and her art collective can "be a bridge between two cultures." Elsrakbi and Foundland began to focus on themes relating to Arab politics after the 2011 Syrian uprising. Alexander feels that she and Elsrakbi have a similar approach to art and subject matter, which is what drew them together.

Foundland's work uses graphic design elements mixed with drawings, video and photography. Elsrakbi and Alexander find media and social media observations and reports about the Middle East, using these to create a database of both visual art and information. They then make connections based on the information they have found and "create alternate narratives to media reporting through innovative image making and personal interpretation."
