= Cathy Battistessa =

- Origin: United Kingdom
- Genres: Balearic, Chillout, Downtempo, Deep House, Electronica, UK Garage
- Years active: 1990s–present
- Labels: B The Label, B Chill, Universal, Defected, Café del Mar
- Website: cathybattistessa.co.uk

Cathy Battistessa is a British recording artist, songwriter, and visual artist known for her distinctive contributions to Balearic, chillout, and downtempo music genres. Hailed as "The Voice of Café del Mar," she is internationally recognized for her soulful vocals and multidisciplinary artistic work encompassing painting, sculpture, and installation art.

== Early life and education ==
Battistessa grew up in Ibiza, Spain, immersed in the island’s bohemian culture. She began drawing and creating sand sculptures from a young age. She later apprenticed under British painter and poet Paul Lake, whose mentorship significantly influenced her artistic development.

== Music career ==
Battistessa gained prominence in the 1990s collaborating on influential Balearic chillout tracks, including:

- "More Than Ever People" (Levitation)
- "Speck of Gold" (Afterlife)
- "Let It Go" (Afterlife)
- "Oh Home" (Paco Fernandez)
- "Happiness" (Blank & Jones)

Her voice became integral to the renowned Café del Mar compilation series.

In the UK, she achieved mainstream success co-writing and performing "A Little Bit of Luck" with DJ Luck & MC Neat, which peaked at number nine on the UK Singles Chart in January 2000. Battistessa has released music through labels such as Universal, Ministry of Sound, Sony, Defected, and Hed Kandi.

In 2019, she founded her own labels, B The Label and B Chill, the latter focusing on ambient and downtempo music.

== Visual art ==
Alongside music, Battistessa’s artistic practice includes painting, sculpture, glass installations, and land art, often exploring themes of spirituality and emotional journeys.

She has exhibited internationally at:

- Northcote Gallery, London
- Galeria Azur, Barcelona
- Blue Room Gallery, Miami
- Galleria San Rafael, Ibiza

In 2013, she participated in the GLASSTRESS exhibition at the Venice Biennale.

== Recognition ==
Battistessa has been recognized as:

- "The Voice of Café del Mar"
- "Queen of Ibiza" by global music press
- Multi-platinum award recipient for "More Than Ever People"
- Guest performer at H.H. the Dalai Lama’s birthday celebration
- Artist whose music has been licensed by Porsche, Sony PlayStation, TUI, and HBO
- Featured artist on Saatchi Art

== Personal life ==
Battistessa resides between Devon, London, and Ibiza, continuing her multidisciplinary creative endeavors.
