= Chris Coco =

British DJ and producer

Christopher Mellor, known by the stage name Chris Coco, is a British chill-out and Balearic DJ and producer.

He had a Saturday night residency at The Zap nightclub in Brighton, from the late 1980s to the mid-1990s. He was a member of Coco Steel & Lovebomb in the 1990s, with Lene Stokes and Craig Woodrow. Chris Coco was editor of DJ Mag from 1990 to 2000. From 2002 to 2006, he and Rob da Bank presented The Blue Room weekend music show on BBC Radio 1. He has released solo records on Distinctive Records as well as on his own label DSPPR.

== Discography ==
=== Albums ===
==== As Coco Steel & Lovebomb ====
- It! (Warp, 1994)
- New World (Other, 1997)
- Sun Set (Other, 1998)
- Remixed (Other, 1999)
- The Chillout Album (Melodica, 2014)

==== As Chris Coco ====
- Next Wave (Distinctive Breaks, 2002) – with contributions from Iain Banks, Patrick Bergin, Nick Cave, and Monica Queen
- Acoustic Chill 2 (Distinctive, 2003)
- Heavy Mellow (Distinctive, 2005)
- How To Disappear Completely (DSPPR, 2016)

==== As City Reverb ====
- Lost City Folk [And The Grace Reunion] (Dumb Angel, 2008) – with Micky Buccheri, Ben Burns, Nick Cornu and Sacha Puttnam
