= A Man Called Adam (group) =

British electronic music duo

A Man Called Adam (sometimes abbreviated to AMCA) are the British electronic music artists Sally Rodgers and Steve Jones, and are regarded by many in the electronic music field as pivotal in the development of the electronic music genres acid jazz, Balearic house, Chill Out and Nu British House. Test Pressing magazine described them as "Britain’s unsung pop heroes."

== Career ==
Recording for DJ Gilles Peterson’s fledgling Acid Jazz Records label, A Man Called Adam found that it was the remixed B-sides "Techno Powers" and "Amoeba" (electronic versions of the A-side tracks) that became cult records, bridging the divide between the jazz, rare groove and acid house scenes.

AMCA later moved to Big Life Records and released "Barefoot In The Head". Produced by Sally Rodgers, Steve Jones and sound engineer Mat Clark, the track features choral pads and strings coupled with bouncing Roland 909 and 727 rhythm tracks. The Channel 4 documentary A Short Film About Chilling... featured the band along with The Farm, DJs Andrew Weatherall, Terry Farley and Rocky and Diesel, and charted their journey to Ibiza with club promoter Charlie Chester, and a couple of hundred British ravers on the first organised clubbing holiday of its kind. The vocal sample, of American actor Rod McKuen intoning 'I put a seashell to my ear' to the sound of waves lapping the shore, meant the track would ever be associated with sun-drenched beaches and the term 'Balearic House' came into use.

Around the same time, Paul Daley left the band to join Leftfield. Rodgers and Jones went on to release their debut album The Apple in 1991. Following the release of several singles from the LP ("I Want To Know", "The Chrono Psionic Interface" and "Bread, Love And Dreams"), AMCA left Big Life to set up their own label, Other Records.

Through the mid-1990s, AMCA released several singles and contributed to The Café del Mar series of compilation albums, as well as creating a side project, Beachflea, and their Planet Jazz and Other Stuff compilations on Other Records. Rodgers and Jones also compiled High in a Basement for Heavenly Records, a selection of works from notable British artists and labels such as Faze Action and Reel Houze.

The second AMCA album, Duende, was released in 1998 and included the singles "Easter Song", "Que Tal America" and "All My Favourite People". It also featured the song "Estelle", which was never released as a single but continues to be included on multiple Chill Out compilations.

A third AMCA album, All My Favourite..., was released in 2004 on Norman Cooke's Southern Fried label, and featured a selection of songs from the two previous albums alongside several new songs. It also included an acoustic version of their signature song, "Barefoot In The Head", which was released as a single.

Rodgers has since earned a master's degree and PhD from the University of St Andrews; she describes her research as "an impact narrative about how capture and recording technologies have, over time, changed lyric forms... all the way from the Romantics to Bob Dylan and Hip Hop". Jones has a PhD in New Media at De Montfort University, as well as an M(Sc) in sound design from the University of Edinburgh. They have continued to work together as sound designers on museum, film and theatrical commissions, notably the BME (British Music Experience) — a museum charting the history of British pop music and The British Museum's exhibition Journey to the afterlife: The Egyptian Book of the Dead.

Reflecting their interest in avant-garde and art music, Rodgers and Jones recording and creating installation works as Discrete Machines, released an album and two EPs between 2011 and 2015.

In March 2019, A Man Called Adam bounced back into the scene with their album Farmarama. Lowdown magazine reviewed Farmarama as "born out of a mature union of individuals who understand themselves fully as artists and have complete awareness of where they want to take their music [...] A Man Called Adam are a great talent currently displaying an acute sense of creativity unhampered by the constraints of genre."

Ban Ban Ton Ton Blog says: "Mixing the resulting sometimes asymmetric building blocks with clank, glitch, and digital fizz, to reconstruct something fresh. Music that references their Acid Jazz origins, yet has all its beats broken in a 21st century way. While digging at the emptiness and selfishness of modern life, they are effectively a healing mantra. Embodying positivity and hope."

Rodgers is also an in demand DJ playing at clubs and festivals worldwide.

== Discography ==
=== Albums ===
- The Apple (1991, Big Life)
- Duende (1998, Other Records)
- All My Favourite A Man Called Adam (2004, Southern Fried Records)
- Collected Works Volume One (2014, Other Records)
- Collected Works Volume Two (2014, Other Records)
- Collected Works Volume Three (2014, Other Records)
- Sketches, Schleißen 7 (2018, Emotional Response)
- Farmarama (2019, Other Records)
- Farmarama Remixes, Vol. 1 (2019, Other Records)
- Farmarama Remixes, Vol. 2 (2019, Other Records)
- Farmarama – The Magnificent 7s (2020, Other Records)
- A Man Called Adam: Love Forgotten – Oddities & Rarities, Pt. 1 (2020, Other Records)
- A Man Called Adam : Love Forgotten – Oddities & Rarities, Pt. 2 (2021, Other Records)

=== Singles and EPs ===
Year	Single	Peak positions	Album
Year	Single	UK	Album
1988	"A.P.B."	—	singles only
1989	"Earthly Powers"	—	singles only
1989	"Musica De Amor"	—	singles only
1990	"Barefoot In The Head"	60	The Apple
1991	"I Want To Know"	—	The Apple
1991	"The Chrono Psionic Interface"	—	The Apple
1992	"Bread, Love And Dreams"	—	The Apple
1993	"I Am, Is The Way"	—	singles only
1993	"Love Come Down"	—	singles only
1995	"Easter Song"	—	singles only
1996	"Que' Tal America?"	—	singles only
1996	"The Jihad EP"	—	singles only
1998	"Que' Tal America?"	197	Duende
1999	"All My Favourite People (Stay With Me)"	—	Duende
1999	"Easter Song"	—	Duende
2004	"Love Forgotten"	—	All My Favourite...
2004	"Earthsings" (feat. Brenda Fassie)	—	All My Favourite...
2004	"Barefoot In The Head 04"	97	All My Favourite...
2019	"Farmarama Remixes Vols. 1 & 2"	—	All My Favourite...
