= Lenny Ibizarre =

- Born: Lennart Kisum Krarup; August 2, 1972 (age 54)
- Origin: Copenhagen, Denmark
- Genres: Electronic; Ambient; Chill-out music Progressive house
- Occupations: Producer; Disc Jockey
- Years active: 1995–present
- Labels: Warner UK; Ibizarre Records; Pacific Electronic Music
- Website: lennyibizarre.com

Lenny Ibizarre (born Lennart Krarup) is a Danish producer, DJ, composer and musician from Copenhagen. He is known for his work as a DJ and record producer in Ibiza. Lenny Ibizarre is also a remix artist, favoring multi-platinum artists such as The Doors, Bob Dylan, Bob Marley, Jefferson Airplane, Nat King Cole and Henry Mancini.

== History ==
From a young age, Lenny moved to Brussels for 7 years and got into EBM music and Metal. He claims that Belgium was a great place to witness the cultural development and evolution of clubbing of the 80s.In the clubs, he heard of Ibiza, where he visited for a short period before going to England to do his degree for 3 years.

After his last exam he flew back to Ibiza and partied with psytrance and LSD. The winter that followed, Lenny started creating ambient music as a way of mental restoration. Eventually, one of his friends suggested recording the songs and selling it on the beach, which he did.

In 1997, Lenny Ibizarre officially entered the music scene in Ibiza where he created his first album, The Ambient Collection, which was signed by Warner Music UK.

Since 1997, Lenny Ibizarre has produced 12 albums and is a multi-platinum selling artist. His chilled Ibiza compilations sold over 1.5 million copies in the UK. The Ambient Collection reached its 6th edition in 2006.

Ibizarre has also held residencies at Cafe Del Mar, Pacha, Khumaras, Ku (Privilege) and Amnesia.

In 1997, Lenny Ibizarre also founded his record label, Ibizarre Records and co-founded the annual international DJ Awards with Jose Pascual which held their 18th anniversary in 2015.

In 2009, Lenny Ibizarre stated in an interview with DV.FM that he had offers from Sony, BMG, Rondor Music and Xtravaganza Recordings but had turned them down. He created Ibizarre Records with his reason being that starting his own record label could make him a better living by licensing tracks to compilations with his main focus on local distribution in Ibiza.

In 2011, Lenny Ibizarre and Max Martire formed the "Aristofreeks" - an outlet for their remixing and producing. September 2013, Pacific Electronic Music record label was formed by Jerry L. Greenberg (former President of Atlantic Records), Max Martire & Lenny Ibizarre. Their first signing was Kathy Sledge of Sister Sledge.

In 2017, Lenny Ibizarre was chosen alongside other composers to form the soundtrack for the Polyphony Digital's Gran Turismo Sport. Later on, this would lead to him also creating exclusive tracks and Classical remixes for the game's successor, Gran Turismo 7.

== Discography ==
=== Studio Albums ===
- The Ambient Collection Vol.1 (1997)
- The Ambient Collection Vol.2 (1998)
- The Ambient Collection Vol.3 (1999)
- The Ambient Collection Vol.4 (2000)
- The Ambient Collection Vol.5 (2001)
- The Ambient Collection Vol.6 (2006)
- Just Musik (2005)

=== Singles and EPs ===
- Twilight Shufflery-EP (2009)

=== Compilation Albums ===
- Psycho Navigator (2010)
