= Café del Mar =

Bar in Ibiza, Spain

Coordinates: 38°58′50″N 1°17′46″E

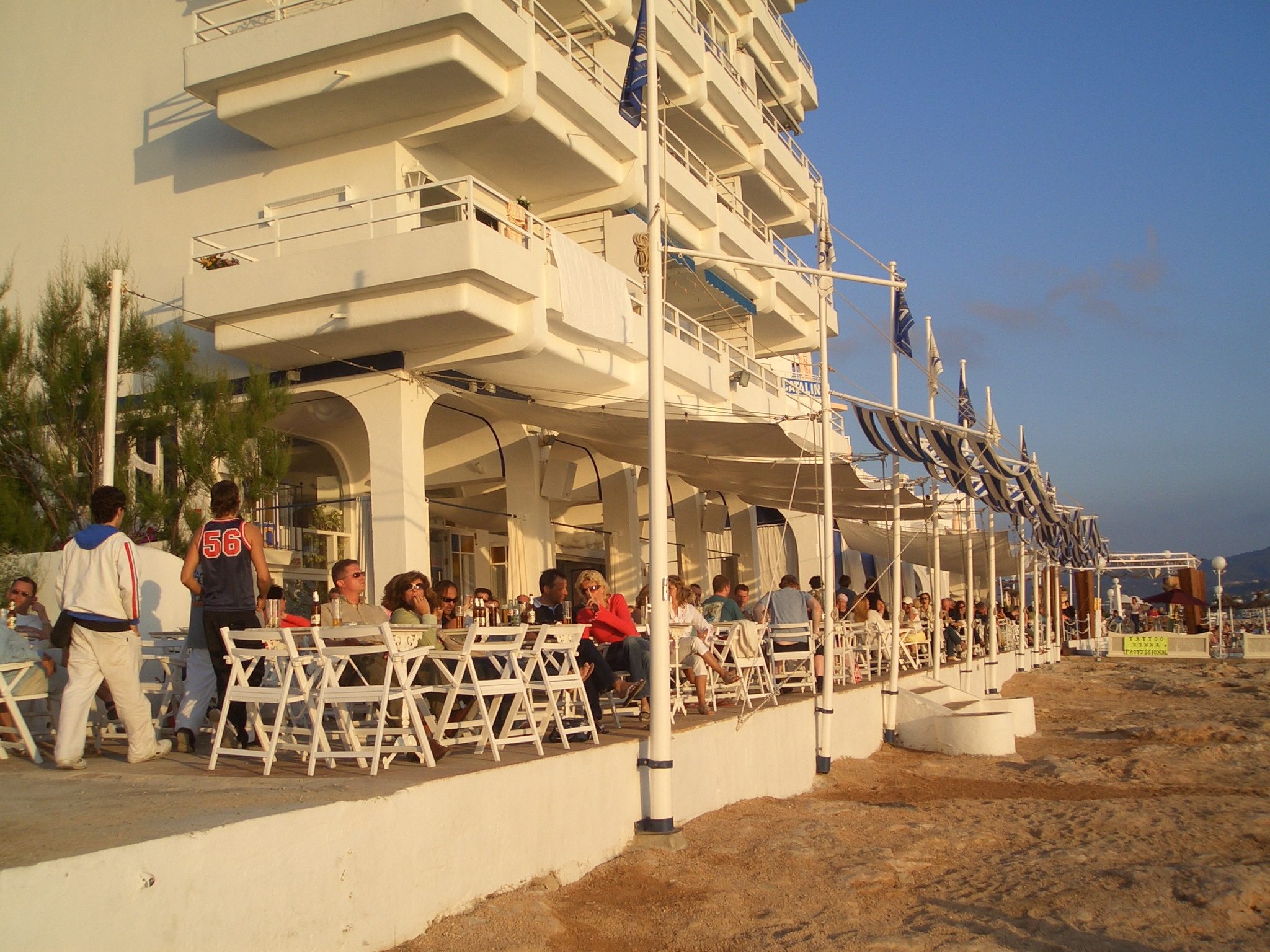
- Café del Mar in 2005, with flags celebrating its 25th anniversary
- Company type: Bar
- Founded: 1980
- Headquarters: Sant Antoni de Portmany, Ibiza
- Number of locations: 9 (3 in Spain, 6 international)
- Website: www.cafedelmar.com

Café del Mar (Spanish pronunciation: [kaˈfe ðel ˈmaɾ], Catalan: [kəˈfe ðəl ˈma]; "Sea Café") is a bar located in Sant Antoni de Portmany, Ibiza, established in 1980. In 1999, it founded the record label Café del Mar Music, known for its series of chillout CDs.

== History ==
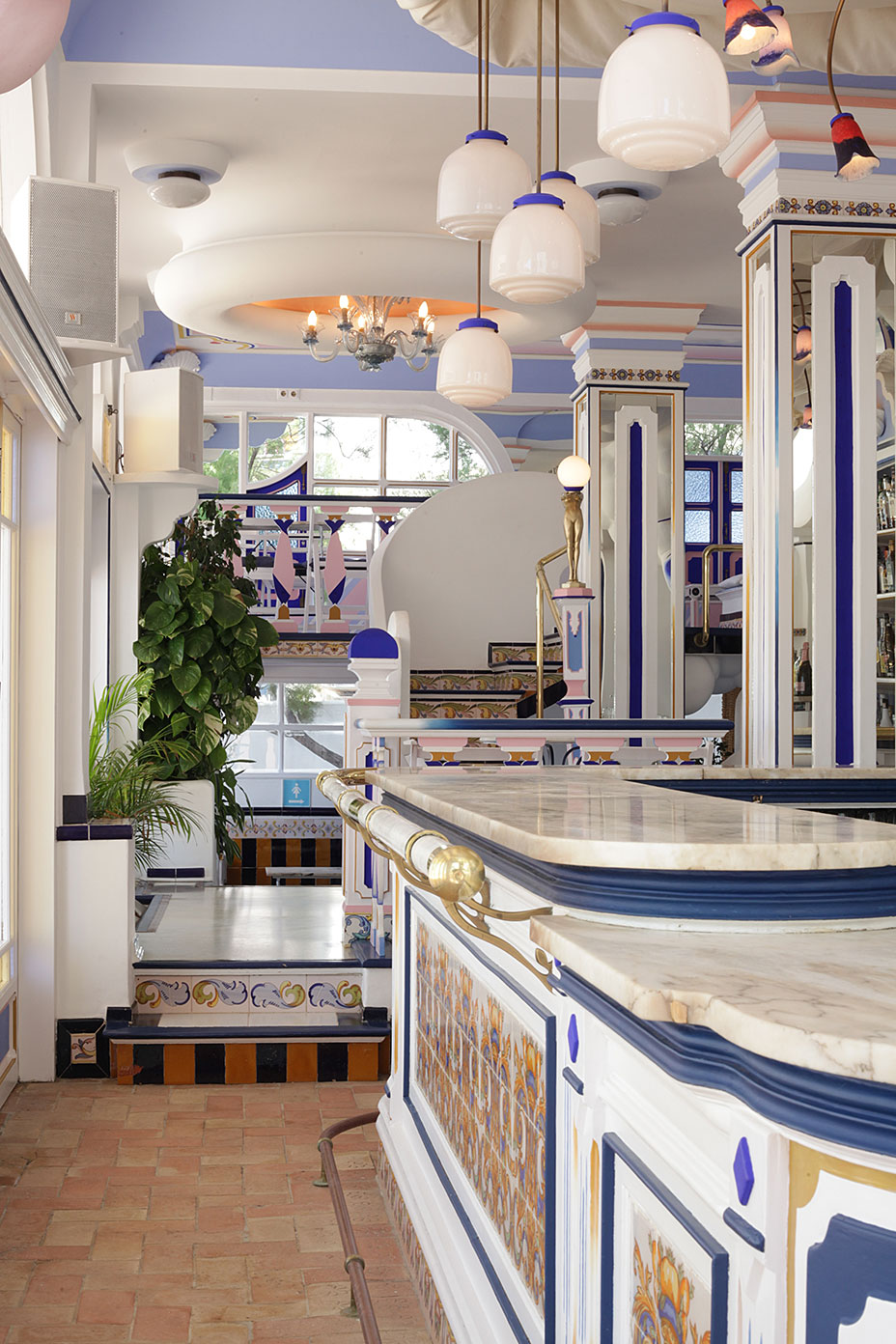
Interior of Café del Mar

The Café del Mar was founded on 20 June 1980. The look of the Café del Mar was designed by architect Lluis Güell. He was in charge of the design, decoration and architecture.

DJ José Padilla who became famous for his sunset sets that began in 1991 at Café del Mar also created the first six volumes of the Café del Mar compilation albums between 1994 and 1999. He died on 22 October 2020 of colon cancer.

Today, Café del Mar is a bar brand that includes a bar in Ibiza and seven bars elsewhere in the world, including Cartagena de Indias.

== Café del Mar Music ==
Café del Mar Music releases Balearic ambient, easy listening music. The collections of the music played at the café were first sold on cassette at the end of the 1980s. Starting circa 1994, Café del Mar compilation CDs have been released by various labels. In 1999, the owner of the café founded the Café del Mar Music label. As of April 2017, a total of 22 volumes of the main compilation series have been published.

Café Del Mar hosted the DJs Phil Mison, Jim Breese, and Chris Coco who recorded a few songs as 3 Balearos in 2012, including the single "Summer breezin'".

=== Artists ===
Café del Mar compilations contain music by Pat Metheny, A. R. Rahman, Moby, Jean Michel Jarre, Chicane, Underworld, Rhian Sheehan, Afterlife - Steve Miller, Gary B., Luminous, Linda Di Franco, Triangle Sun and Thomas Newman.

=== Releases ===
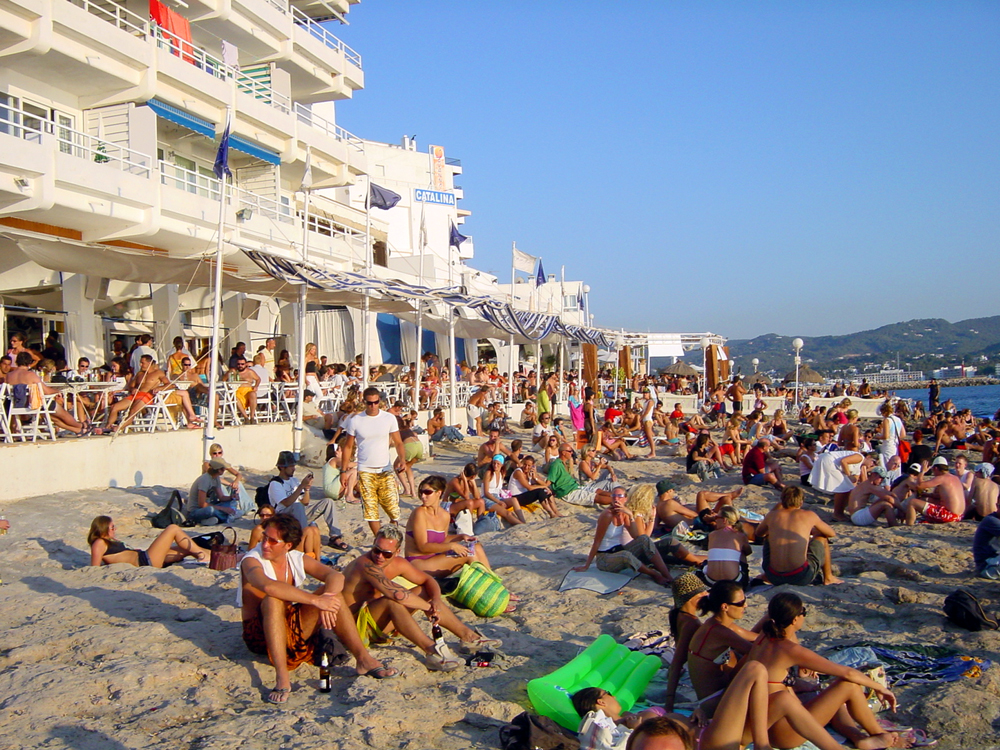
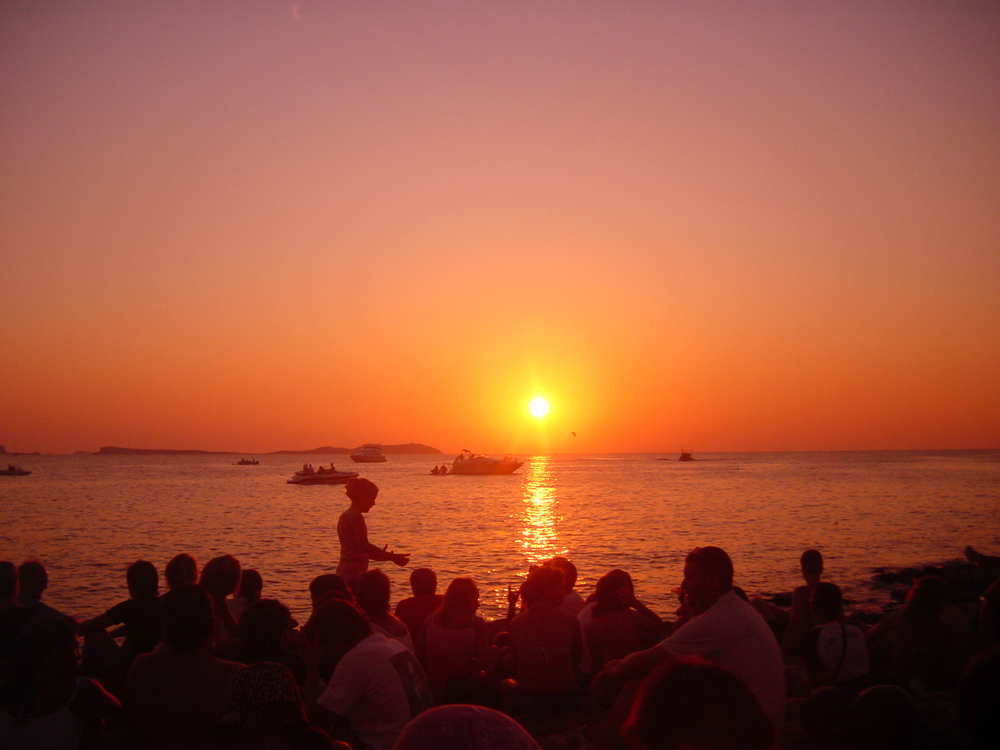
Groups gathered to witness a sunset at Café del Mar, August 2003

==== Other labels ====
- Café Del Mar, (January 1993) Eye Q Records
- Café Del Mar - Volumen Cuatro, (1999) Manifesto Records (UK)

==== Café del Mar Music releases ====
- Aria, (1999) produced by Paul Schwartz, (originally released in 1997 by Astor Place)
- Aria 2 - New Horizons, (1999) produced by Paul Schwartz
- Café Del Mar - Chillhouse Mix 5, (2007)

=== Radio and livestreaming ===
Café del Mar began live streaming via their YouTube channel on 28 September 2020. The live stream is titled "Café del Mar Ibiza Live Chillout Radio & Webcam 24/7" and streams purely chillout music without any vocal activity from a DJ. Common artists featured include Everything but the Girl, Groove Armada, Afterlife, Nightmares on Wax, Cathy Battistessa and Sade.
