= Garon (surname) =

Garon is a French surname. It is derived from the Germanic personal name Garo, meaning "ready", as well as from places in the Loire and Rhône departments.

== People with the name ==
- Alban Garon (1930–2007), Canadian judge
- Jesse Garon Presley (1935), Twin brother of Elvis Aaron Presley, creator of Rockabilly music.
- Jean Garon (1938–2014), Canadian politician, lawyer, academic and economist
- Jesse Garon (musician) (born 1962), French singer-songwriter
- Joseph Garon (1814–1890), Canadian notary and politician
- Mathieu Garon (born 1978), Canadian ice hockey player
- Paul Garon, American author, writer and editor
- Pauline Garon (1900–1965), Canadian-born American silent film actress
- Sheldon Garon, American historian
- Timothy Garon (1951–2008), American singer-songwriter

== See also ==
- Garo (name)
