= Kostabi =

Family name

Kostabi is a surname. Notable people with the surname include:

- Heino Kostabi (1933–2021), Estonian politician
- Mark Kostabi (born 1960), American artist and composer, brother of Paul
- Paul Kostabi (born 1962), American artist, musician, music producer and audio engineer, brother of Mark

== See also ==
- Kostabi World Trade Center, a proposed building by Mark Kostabi
