= LoveCat Music =

American independent music publisher

- Industry: Music publisher
- Genre: Rock, Latin, world, dance, French, Russian, Jazz, country
- Founded: 1999
- Headquarters: New York City
- Website: www.lovecatmusic.com

LoveCat Music is an American independent record company and music publisher. It was founded by Randy Frisch in 1999 and holds a catalog of over 10,000 songs. It originally focused on indie rock, notably promoting artists such as Evan Olson and Los Straitjackets. Since then the label has grown and diversified into many genres including Latin (Cesar Mora, Latin Soul Syndicate), French (Jacqueline Taïeb), Russian, Middle Eastern (Angel Tears, Zino & Tommy), and jazz (Bill Anschell, Four Piece Suit). Three of LoveCat's best-known rock artists are Reagan Youth, Joe Marson and The Go Getters.

The LoveCat Latina label specializes in Latin music, with writer-artists from Colombia, Mexico, Spain and Ecuador. Its roster includes Latin Soul Syndicate (USA), Los Niños de Sara (France), Cesar Mora (Colombia), La Palabra (Cuba-USA) and Damn (Sweden).

The RedCat Muzyka catalog has songs by notable Russian writer-artists including Gene Pritsker, Masha Shkonik (folk), Olga Alex (dance), Masha Pruss (rock) and the acclaimed Flying Balalaika Brothers (rock). LoveChat Musique publishes French songs by 1960s ye-ye chanteuse Jacqueline Taïeb, the rap duo La Caution and Parisian rockabilly singer Jesse Garon (musician), among others.

LoveCat Music's R&B and hiphop writer-artists include I.O.D. (Brooklyn), Rothstein (NYC), Thunny Brown (Brooklyn) and MisterrCha (London). The label's notable jazz artists include Bill Anschell, Mathias Landaeus, Four Piece Suit, Tobias Gebb and Doug Ferony.

Some artists are signed only to LoveCat's music publishing company (Los Niños de Sara, Madder Rose, Doug Kershaw, Mary Lorson & Saint Low, Seb Taylor aka Kaya Project, Nick Fowler, Athenaeum). Songs from the LoveCat catalog have been licensed in films and television shows including Deadpool, Beverly Hills Chihuahua, Lady Bird, The Sopranos, Sex and the City, The Devil Wears Prada and SpongeBob SquarePants.

== Artists ==
- Angel Tears
- Bill Anschell
- Nick Fowler
- Jesse Garon (musician)
- The Go Getters
- Evan Olson
- Matt Keating
- Khalil
- La Palabra
- Daniel Lemma
- Los Straitjackets
- Misisipi Mike Wolf
- Gene Pritsker
- Cree Rider
- Reagan Youth
- Mary Lorson & Saint Low
- Sandy Mouche
- Snuzz
- Jacqueline Taïeb
- Tracy Thornton
- Pierce Turner
- Chris Von Sneidern
- Zee Asher
- Zino & Tommy

== See also ==
- List of record labels
