= Jesse Garon =

Jesse Garon may refer to:

- Jesse Garon (disc jockey), Olean, New York radio host
- Jesse Garon and the Desperadoes, indie-pop group from Edinburgh, Scotland
- Jesse Garon (musician), French musician
- Jesse Garon Presley, stillborn twin brother of American singer and actor Elvis Presley
