= Alabina =

French music band

- Origin: Israel; France
- Genres: Middle Eastern world Arabic; Gypsy; Hebrew
- Years active: 1996–present
- Labels: Atoll; Profile; LoveCat; Astor Place
- Members: Ishtar; Los Niños de Sara
- Website: www.ishtaralabina.net

Alabina is a French-based band that performs a mix of world music: Middle Eastern, Arabic, French, Hebrew, and Spanish Gypsy music. Alabina consists of lead singer Ishtar, who does the female vocals, and the band Los Niños de Sara, who provide male vocals and music.

== Name ==
According to Alabina.org, the word is Arabic and Alabina has two meanings: "let's go" and "God is between us." The name comes from the title of Alabina's first song. It is also the name of the group's first album.

== Group ==
Alabina consists of lead singer Ishtar, who does the female vocals, and the band Los Niños de Sara, who provide male vocals and music.

=== Ishtar ===
Ishtar was born Eti Zach (Hebrew: אתי זך) in Israel. She grew up there to parents who are of Moroccan-Jewish and Egyptian-Jewish descent. She speaks and sings in Hebrew, Arabic, French, Spanish, and English; she also says she "half-speaks" "Moroccan." Ishtar began performing in clubs at age 15 and continued even after her high school graduation when she was enlisted to the Israeli military (IDF), where she served as a helicopter technician. Though she was born Eti Zak, she chose the professional name "Ishtar," a Mesopotamian goddess, because her grandmother called her Ester, which "with her Egyptian accent it sounded like Ishtar," she said.

As the lead singer of Alabina, Ishtar frequently sings in Arabic, complementing the Spanish of Los Niños de Sara. She often employs the use of gamakas and ululation. She also sings Hebrew songs, sometimes songs from her childhood, only alone, however — not with Alabina. Occasionally she joins Los Niños in Spanish. On her own, she frequently sings French. Nine out of twelve songs in her album The Voice of Alabina are in French — and she has two songs in English: "C'Est La Vie My Baby" (Truly (Emet)) and "Lady revolver" (The Voice of Alabina).

Ishtar is frequently featured on Alabina album covers. She has dyed blonde hair, which is sometimes curly, and dark brown eyes. She has been noted for her provocative dress in pictures and at concerts.

On her own, Ishtar has produced three albums: The Voice of Alabina (2000), Truly (Emet) (2003) and Je sais d'où je viens (2005). The first is mainly composed of French songs, the second is mostly in Hebrew, and Ishtar's last album is primarily in Arabic, with four songs in French, one in Spanish and significant chunks of English dispersed throughout.

Ishtar currently lives in France, but has also a home located in the southern city of Eilat in Israel.

=== Los Niños de Sara ===
Los Niños de Sara (in Spanish, "Sara's children") are Spanish-speaking Gypsies from Montpellier, France. The four cousins are named Antonio ("Tonio") (also written Antoine) Contreras, Ramón Compas, Santiago ("Santi") Lorente, and Coco. Though they speak both Spanish and French, they only sing in their native Spanish. Tonio, the lead male singer, plays guitar. In addition to all providing back-up vocals, Ramón and Santi play guitar and Coco plays percussion.

On their own, Los Niños have produced two CDs: La Cubanita (2001) and Gipsyolé (2003). Their songs often speak of family, love, and God. Los Niños are Catholic.

Their birthdays are: Tonio, March 27; Ramón, January 7; Santi, September 4; and Coco, September 5.

They currently live in France.

== Music ==
Alabina's music mixes many styles, cultures, and languages: Middle Eastern, Spanish music, French, raï, flamenco, gypsy, Arabic, and at times, Western pop. The group often takes older songs, for example, "Habibi Ya Nour El Ain" the Arabic song of Amr Diab, and adds a mix of styles and languages and Alabina's own flavor. The new version, "Habibi de Mis Amores" in both Arabic and Spanish, is one example. Another example is "Lolole (Don't Let Me Be Misunderstood)", which Alabina turned into an upbeat Arabic-Spanish song, which though it can be recognized from the melody, is far from its original: a Western pop song in English. "Habibi Ya Nour El Ain" performed by Alabina, Ishtar was used in a bollywood movie Agent Vinod (2012 film) scene background when Agent Vinod and Freddie Khambatta are seen walking out of Morocco Airport. However their song was not credited by the producers of Agent Vinod (2012 film). The song "Alabina" is well known in France for being the end credits music in the French comedies La Vérité si je mens! and La Vérité si je mens! 2. Their single "Ole y ola" reached number 19 on the French music charts in 1997 and was certified silver. The single "Alabina" spent 21 weeks on the charts, peaking at 29.

== Discography ==
=== Albums ===
- Alabina (1996) Astor Place
- The Album II (1998) Astor Place
- Sahara (1999)
- L'essentiel (2000)
- The Ultimate Club Remixes (2002)
- Baila (2016)

=== Songs ===
- "Amore de mis amore"
- "Pour toi et moi"
- "Alabina (De la noche a la mañana)"
- "Carnaval"
- "Lolai"
- "Lady Revolver"
- "Choukrane (Shukran)"
- "Habibi de Mis Amores"
- "Baila"
- "Tierra santa"
- Наши Ночи Наши Дни Alen Begl & Ishtar Alabina
