= Glint (band) =

US musical group

- Origin: New York City, New York, United States
- Genres: Dream pop, electronic, experimental, new wave, rock
- Years active: 2003–present
- Labels: Votiv, Rely Records
- Members: Jase Blankfort, Anders Fleming
- Website: www.glintonline.com

Glint is an American project founded in 2003 by Jase Blankfort. As its main producer, singer, songwriter, and multi-instrumentalist, Blankfort is accompanied by Anders Fleming. The band has since signed to Votiv and announced their new album Inverter, out March 11, 2016.

== History ==
Jase Blankfort was born and raised in Orangeburg, New York, a suburb of New York City; he began as a theatre actor in his early teens and appeared in several Broadway and off-Broadway productions in New York City (including works by Pam Gems, Anton Chekhov, Ricky Ian Gordon, Tina Landau, and Janusz Glowaki). After a departure from the stage and screen, Blankfort dropped out of high school, relocated to Los Angeles and began writing music. Various acoustic performances in Los Angeles, New York, and Boston showed a promising future for Blankfort and sparked the interest of an enthusiastic Boston University student and Blankfort's brother, Adam Jordan (Blankfort), who was eager to collaborate with his younger brother. Blankfort and Jordan founded Rely Records, an independent record label to serve as a platform for Blankfort’s budding songwriting career. During a short visit to their parents' house that ultimately resulted in a permanent move back east, Blankfort met percussive innovator Mateus Tebaldi, a native of Brazil who had recently arrived in the United States from Milan, Italy.

Glint caught the attention of producer-engineer Nic Hard (The Bravery, Aberdeen City, The Kin) on the night Glint was crowned winners of the 2007 Independent Music World Series, chosen by Billboard Magazine, and he went on to produce Sound in Silence in 2007. Sonically orientated as a quartet yet created as a duo, Tebaldi and Blankfort needed to fill in the blank spaces in order to do the record justice in live performances. A search to find like-minded individuals resulted in a touring lineup of Tebaldi, Blankfort, Kuperberg and special guests Alon Leventon (keys) and Dave Johnsen (Bass).

Glint toured Europe in 2009. The 2009 Sound in Sight tour brought them to 10 countries in 40 days, performing 30 shows across England, Scotland, Ireland, Germany, Czech Republic, Austria, and the Netherlands. Notable main stage festival appearances included Dockville in Hamburg, Germany, Noorderzon in Groningen, Netherlands, and Castlepalooza in Tullamore, Ireland. Half of the tour included support dates with The Airborne Toxic Event, MGMT, and the Crystal Antlers. The success of this tour put Glint on the radar of NME, Artrocker, and the UK Metro.

Jase Blankfort and Alon Leventon self-produced GLINT - EP, released July 2009 in the UK and February 2010 in the US, recorded in various New York studios, and mixed by Michael Brauer at Electric Lady Studios.

Matt Pinfield is a fan of the band and had them on his show, Matt Pinfield in the Mornings on 101.9 WRXP for an unplugged performance and interview on November 17, 2008. Glint had two live performances on Fearless Music which was aired on FOX TV in 2009. Glint toured the United States in March and April 2010, performing official showcases at SXSW and supporting the electronic artist BT.

After releasing the Introvert and Extrovert EPs in late 2015, Glint will be releasing their full-length album Inverter on March 11, 2016, on Votiv.

== Style ==
Glint's music has been described as emulative of early David Bowie and Eno-esque atmosphere, while their recent release has branched out in a new unique direction. Glint plays “Arena-ready Rock” that combines a wall of sound with pop sensibilities, finding the duality of dream pop softness with post rock edge.

In July 2009, the UK Metro stated “Muse's Matt Bellamy is a clear influence on Glint singer Jase Blankfort, but the New York outfit are arguably even more epic than the British band, full of glistening synths, massive hooks and orchestral swatches [...] This may be your only chance to catch them in relatively intimate surrounds before the inevitable arenas.”

"In the musical solar system of Glint's open and glimmering sound, vocals pull elements from Muse and a little bit of Bowie here and there" states The Deli Magazine, in a review of Sound in Silence.

Billboard called Glint's live show “air tight” and said that Jase Blankfort was “irresistible.”

Earmilk describes that the new release serves to “...capture a haunting ethereality in the context of alternative folk rock."

== Mode to Joy ==
Jordan Lehning, son of noted producer Kyle Lehning produced the band's first studio effort, Mode to Joy, recorded in an abandoned 1800s firehouse throughout 2005. “I almost look at 'Mode to Joy' as a memory…a lot of the songs on the first album I wrote when I was really young, in my early teens. Mode To Joy [serves as] a photo album of the past, once we were given the resources to basically…do anything sonically, we just naturally and organically progressed…” said Jase Blankfort. Contemporary artist Paul Kostabi created the album art.

== Sound in Silence ==
The band's first major studio effort, Sound in Silence, was recorded on over 1,000 acres (4.0 km^{2}) of rural land at the King Estate Vineyard in Eugene, Oregon on November 1–17, 2007 at Blackberry Hill Studios with producer/engineer Nic Hard. Contemporary renowned artist Mark Kostabi created the album art. Following the release of Sound in Silence, Kostabi invited Glint to play unplugged on two episodes for his NYC television show, Title This.

== Glint EP ==
With albums primarily known for their signature blend of lush melodies and climactic drumming, Glint released a self-titled 5-song EP in July 2009 (UK) and February 2010 (US), self-produced and mixed by Michael Brauer.

== Inverter ==
To create Inverter, Blankfort took a new approach to the record and set up his studio in empty warehouses in his hometown of Nyack, later completed at The Loft in rural Michigan. During the process Glint grew from essentially a solo project into a developed “wall of sound”, as well as being joined by Anders Fleming as percussionist and multi-instrumentalist. Inverter comes out March 11, 2016 on Votiv.

== Discography ==
=== Albums ===
- 2006: Mode to Joy
- 2008: Sound in Silence
- 2009: Glint EP
- 2015: Introvert EP
- 2015: Extrovert EP
- 2016: Inverter
