= Los Niños de Sara =

French Roma musical group

- Origin: Montpellier, France
- Genres: Rumba catalana, rumba flamenca
- Years active: 1990–present
- Labels: Atoll Music, LoveCat
- Member of: Alabina
- Members: Antonio Contreras; Ramón Campos; Santiago Lorente; Coco

Los Niños de Sara (in Spanish, "Sara's children") is a Spanish-speaking Gitano musical group from Montpellier, France. They perform on their own, but they are best known for the involvement in the musical group Alabina.

== Background ==
They are cousins from Nîmes, France, who have been playing together since they were 14 years old. Described as a cross between the Gipsy Kings and Buena Vista Social Club, the group blends Cuban music, rumba catalana and flamenco (primarily rumba flamenca) and features a touch of North African influence.

After backing flamenco artists including Manitas de Plata and Paco de Lucía, they formed the group Alabina with vocalist Ishtar. Alabina, which combined flamenco music and Arabic vocals, topped the World Music and Latin charts in Billboard magazine.

The four cousins are named Antonio ("Tonio") (also written Antoine) Contreras, Ramón Compas, Santiago ("Santi") Lorente, and Coco. Though they speak both Spanish and French, they only sing in their native Spanish. Tonio, the lead male singer, plays guitar. In addition to all providing back-up vocals, Ramón and Santi play guitar and Coco plays percussion.

On their own, Los Niños have produced two CDs: La Cubanita (2001) and Gipsyolé (2003). Their songs often speak of family, love, and God.

== Discography ==
=== Albums ===
- España Tiene Sabor (2006)
- La Cubanita [Bonus Tracks] (2005)
- Gipsyolé (2003)
- Cubanita (2001)

=== Compilations ===
- Oriental Night Club (2004)
- Club Prive: Excellent Night Life for Trendy People (2002)
- Jan des Bouvrie Limited (2002)
- Voile Rouge at St Tropez, Vol. 2 (2001)
- Latin Moderns, Vol. 2 (2007)
- L' Essentiel (1999)
- The Album (1996)

== See also ==
- Ishtar (singer)
