= The Go Getters =

Swedish rockabilly band

- Origin: Västerås, Sweden
- Genres: Rock and roll; blues; rockabilly; country
- Years active: 1988–present
- Labels: Goofin’ Records, LoveCat Music
- Members: Peter Sandberg; Jonny Andersson; Robin Johnson; Pascal Guimbard
- Past members: Paul Epailys; Tommy Leijdström
- Website: https://www.thegogetters.se/

The Go Getters is a Swedish neo-rockabilly band formed in 1988 by lead singer, standup drummer, and lyricist Peter Sandberg. Other members include Johnny Andersson, and Pascal Guimbard, a founding member of the French rockabilly band The Sprites. Guitarist Robin Johnson, who had joined the band in 1988 died in a motorcycle accident in 2011. In 2018 The Go Getters won the "Best Rockabilly Group" award at the Ameripolitan Music Awards show held in Memphis, Tennessee.

The Go Getters headline at major rockabilly events around the world and have amassed a global following. In 1993 The Go Getters released Real Gone, their first of eight albums and distributed by Part Records. Their most recent album Love & Hate, which includes a cover of "Ring of Fire (song)" by Johnny Cash was released in 2018 by the European rockabilly label Goofin’ Records. Over the years the group has recorded rockabilly versions of famous rock songs such as "Run Rudolph Run," "Should I Stay or Should I Go," "Blitzkrieg Bop," and "Tainted Love."

In November 2013, The Go Getters celebrated their 25th anniversary near Västerås, Sweden, the hometown of Peter Sandberg. In 2018 the band released their most recent album Love and Hate, which includes a tribute to Lemmy Kilmister the founder of the English rock band Motörhead. In 2019 The Go Getters performed at the Ameripolitan Awards in Memphis, Tennessee at The Guesthouse at Graceland. Two of their songs are heard in the TV series True Blood

== Band members ==
- Peter Sandberg (1988–current)
- Johnny Andersson (1988–current)
- Pascal Guimbard (1988–current)
- Robin Johnson (1988–2011)

== Discography ==
=== Albums ===
- Real Gone (1993)
- Hotter Than A Pepper (1996)
- Rockin Roll Is Everywhere (1998)
- Welcome To Sin City (2001)
- Motormouth (2003)
- Live! in Los Angeles (2008)
- Hot Rod Roadeo (2008)
- Love & Hate (2018)

=== Singles ===
- "You Don't Love Me" (1993)
- "Power Meet" (1994) split single with The High Winders
- "Gang War" (1995)
- "Mexigo" (1996)
- "Australian Tour" (1999)
- "Loud Pipes ‘n’ Lead Feet" (1999)
- "Brand New Cadillac"
- "Run Rudolph Run"

== Awards and achievements ==
In 2018 The Go Getters won the "Best Rockabilly Group" award at the Ameripolitan Music Awards show held in Memphis, Tennessee.
