= La Caution =

French Hip Hop Duo

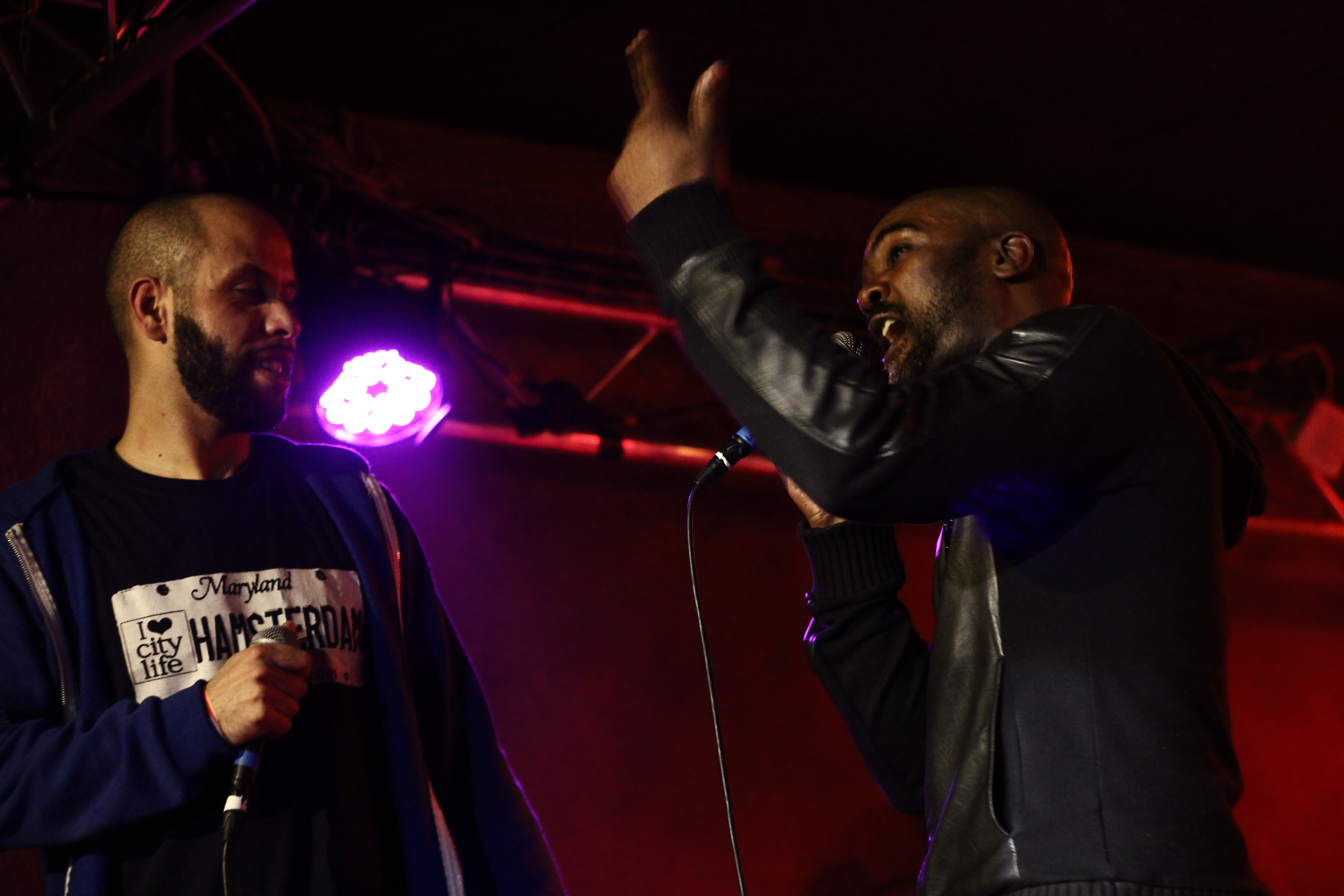
- La Caution performing in 2014

Background information
- Origin: France
- Genres: Hip hop; French hip hop
- Years active: 1999–present
- Labels: Kerozen; Wagram; Assassin; LoveCat Music
- Members: Mohamed "Hi-Tekk" Mazouz; Ahmed "Nikkfurie" Mazouz

La Caution is a French hip hop duo consisting of brothers Hi-Tekk and Nikkfurie, both of Moroccan descent. They are notable for creating the song "Thé à la Menthe" which is known for appearing (in instrumental form) in the 2004 American film Ocean's Twelve. The phrase "thé à la menthe" is French for "mint tea".

== History ==
La Caution's first single "Les rues électriques" ("electric streets") was released in 1999. They began to gain recognition participating in Assassin concerts. As a result, they secured the opening slot on the band's tour in 2000 and 2001; this enabled them to reach an increasingly larger audience. Encouraged by the success of "Les rues électriques", La Caution, shouldered by DJ Fab, released their first album Asphalte Hurlante ("Screaming Asphalt") in 2001. A year later, a version including seven new unreleased titles was released. Participating in many projects with other hip-hop groups, they released the Cadavre Exquis ("Exquisite Corpse") album in 2002, with the collective L'Armée des Douze (French for "Army of Twelve", a collective made up of La Caution and TTC, started in 1999). They also released the Crash Test EP with the electronic group Château Flight.

La Caution's musical style is seen to be a combination of energetic electronic sonorities and original and percussive words. Wanting to break away from the current French rap, they brought a revival that now tends to spread out further than the Parisian underground, along with groups such as TTC. After over three long years, the Peines de Maures / Arc-en-ciel pour Daltoniens double album was released on October 17, 2005. Peines de Maures, a play on words with "Peine de mort" (death penalty) and the Maure tribe, another way of describing people from North Africa, remains within a rather traditional rap style, whereas the second Arc-en-ciel pour Daltoniens ("Rainbow for the colorblind") has more of an electro sound.

The song "Thé à la Menthe" (subtitled "The Laser Dance Version" in its instrumental form) appeared in the 2004 American film Ocean's Twelve in a scene where the thief Nightfox dances in order to evade a series of randomly sweeping laser beams. The song appeared courtesy of Vincent Cassel who, alongside La Caution, is part of Kourtrajmé, an artistic collective. "Thé à la Menthe" was also used in the famous "Too Much for zBlock" a Counter-Strike: Source video/fragmovie by Phoon. La Caution also appeared as an imaginary group called Sheitan on the score to the eponymous film (directed by Kim Chapiron of Kourtrajmé), with the title "Bâtards de Barbares" in which they preach a violent style of rap, which is purely caricatural. The songs "Comme un Sampler" (Like a Sampler) and "Pilotes Automatiques" (Automatic Pilots), taken from the album Peines de Maures, also appear in the film. "Pilotes Automatiques," their French rap remix of the Tamil song "Ottagathai Kattiko" from the Tamil film Gentleman composed by A. R. Rahman was a huge underground success in France. Hi-Tekk and Nikkfurie are also part of the "Les Cautionneurs" collective, with Saphir the Jeweller, Izno (Hi-Tekk and Nikkfurie's little brother), and 16S64.

The latter also appears on both of La Caution's albums, on titles such as J'plante le décor or Révolver. Les Cautionneurs released the album Quinte Flush Royal on September 25, 2006. On November 13, 2006, came out the album entitled La Caution Rend Visite aux Gens et des Gens Revisitent La Caution ("La Caution visits people and people revisit La Caution"), an album on a CD/DVD set made up of remixes of the band's highlights, most notably produced EDA (Enhancer), Radioinactive, Drixxxé, and more. as well as extracts of live appearances and a documentary recalling their career.

La Caution has its own radio show called Les Cautionneurs on the French radio station Le Mouv, featuring two hours of hip hop music every Saturday night.

== Discography ==
- Asphalte Hurlante (Kerozen Music, 2001)
- Crash Test (Kerozen Music, Wagram Music, 2002)
- Peines de Maures / Arc-en-ciel pour Daltoniens ( Kerozen Music, Wagram Music, 2005)
- Peines de Maures / Arc-en-ciel pour Daltoniens - The Instrumental Version [digital-only release] (Kerozen Music, 2006)
- Des Gens Revisitent La Caution / La Caution Rend Visite aux Gens (Kerozen Music, Wagram Music, 2006) (CD/DVD)
