= Zino & Tommy =

Israeli musician

- Origin: Israel
- Genres: Folk, Heavy metal, Hard rock, Rock, Ambient, Electronic, Hip hop, Mizrahi music
- Years active: 1990's–present
- Labels: BNE Records; Helicon Records; LoveCat Music
- Members: Haim Zinovitch (vocals, guitar); Tomer Biran (drums, bass)
- Website: Zino & Tommy on MySpace

Haim Zinovitch, a.k.a. ZINO, is a musician in Israel.

His music encompasses a wide variety of musical genres, from folk to rock to ambient/electronica. With his partner Tomer Biran (TOMMY), he also creates music for films, TV shows, and commercials in Israel. Zinowitch was born of Russian and Moroccan descent.

== Early career ==
He was always interested in different cultures and music, blending his love of folk and rock with Celtic, Scandinavian, and Romanian music, among other influences. His career began with a stint in a military band. Afterward, he collaborated with Israeli musicians on various compilations before recording The Gibberish Album in 1992. This "half circus, half musical" brought 115 musicians and singers from different cultures together on one stage to sing in gibberish—what Zino describes as "folk songs for an imaginary village."

Zino's next album, A Bit of Lust, a Bit of Tenderness, a Bit of Love, (1993) was a major milestone in the development of Israeli alternative and hard rock music and made him the "bad boy" of Israeli rock. Zino's subsequent CDs range from alternative rock (Drive By) to hip-hop tracks featuring Zino's innovative production/sampler techniques (Zino Featuring Human Beatbox). Songs from his CDs have been heard in the hit TV shows The Sopranos, Sex and the City, and others.

== Recent career ==
In 2000, Zino became front-page news in the Israeli media when he disguised himself as a war-scarred singer. Dubbing himself "The Burned Man," he created a fictitious biography and appeared in public disguised as a burned, masked cripple. The Israeli media gave The Burned Man and his mysterious story prime-time coverage, during which Zino revealed his true identity. After this "artistic terror act", The Burned Man's first CD was released, becoming one of Israel's all-time best-selling albums with over 450,000 copies sold according to Haim. A second title followed soon after.

Zino began collaborating with Tomer Biran ("Tommy") in 1997. The duo released four CDs with songs ranging from funk to rock to trance and chill-out. Three of their song were heard in the HBO TV show The Sopranos. The duo's music is also heard in several films including Click, RV and Catwoman.

Their songs are heard on the compilation CDs Lotus Lounge, Buddha Bar, Happiness, and Café del Mar: Dreams. They also create music for many of Israel's prime-time TV dramas, as well as game shows, movies, multimedia projects, and computer games.

== Discography ==
=== Haim Solo Albums ===
- The Gibberish Album (1993)
- A Bit of Lust, a Bit of Tenderness, a Bit of Love (1994)
- Zino Featuring Human Beatbox (1997)

=== Ha'Saruf Albums ===
- Today's Tears are Tomorrow's Honey (2000)
- Let the Fire Burn (2001)

=== Zino & Tommy Albums ===
- Travels With My Amps (2005)
- Invisible Things (2006)
- Want To Funk You (2007)
- Symphonic Rock (2008)

=== Judean People's Front ===
- The Lost Songs (2006)

=== Zino & Noam ===
- Memories (2011) - single
