= Maclay School =

Prep school in Tallahassee, Florida, US

Location
- 3737 North Meridian Road; Tallahassee, Florida 32312; United States; 30°31′24″N 84°16′30″W

Information
- Type: Private
- Established: 1968
- NCES School ID: 00260954
- Principal: James Milford, Head of School
- Faculty: 118
- Grades: PreK –12
- Enrollment: 1051
- Student to teacher ratio: 11.2
- Colors: Blue and white
- Mascot: Marauders
- Annual tuition: Ranges from $9,600 (preschool) to $18,000 (international students)
- Website: www.maclay.org
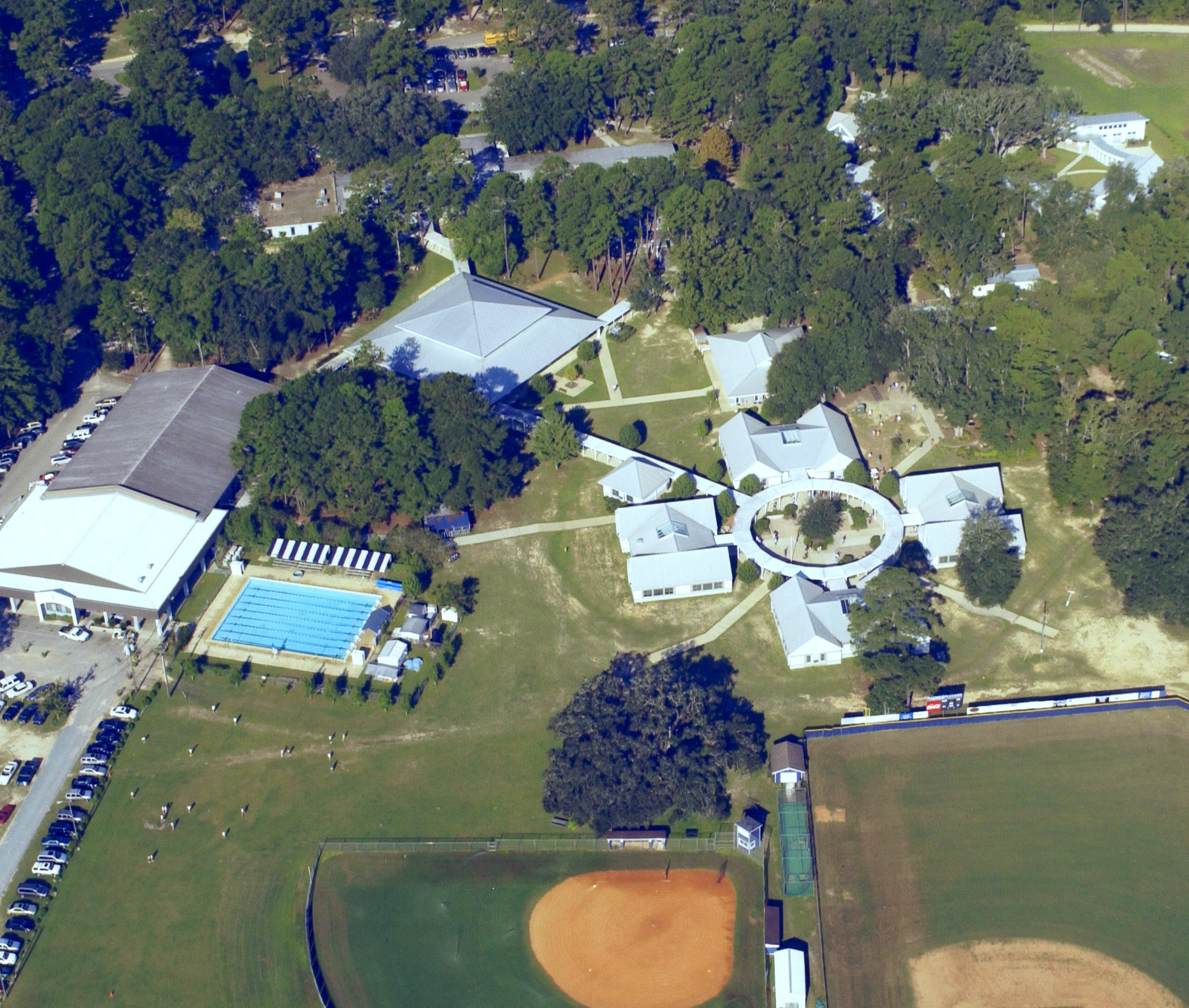
- aerial view

Maclay School is an independent, non-sectarian college-preparatory school in Tallahassee, Florida.

== History ==
In the late 1960s, a group of white parents raised funds to create a segregation academy in response to the federally mandated racial integration of Leon County Schools. Its working name was Capital City Day School, but this was changed before opening to Maclay School, after Alfred B. Maclay Jr., a World War II veteran whose mother was a major benefactor and whose father's estate became Alfred B. Maclay Gardens State Park. The school's campus is bounded on two sides by the park.

Construction on the first campus buildings was completed in a year and a half for $150,000 ($1,388,756 today), allowing the school to open on September 9, 1968, with eight teachers and 138 students. Headmaster William A.P. "Bill" Thompson Jr. said admission was open to anyone, based on I.Q., school transcripts, and ability to do college-prep work. In 1970, the school had 170 students, all white. Thompson told the Tallahassee Democrat newspaper that the school had a non-discriminatory admissions policy but that just one Black person had ever applied and that the prospective student was not accepted. He also said that although other local private schools had been rapidly expanding to accommodate white parents looking to move their children out of integrated schools, Maclay would stick to its plan for "orderly growth."

In 1973, when per capita personal income in Leon County was $4,815, annual tuition at Maclay was $775 for the lower school and $875 for the upper school. The school confirmed to the Tallahassee Democrat that no black yonungsters were enrolled there.

By 1974, the school's 394 students included at least one Black person: 14-year-old Deryk Jones, who told the Tallahassee Democrat that he had been warmly received. In 1976, the school had two Black students, and by 1979, when the student body had grown past 600, there were five. Assistant headmaster Robert Webster told the newspaper that he couldn't say whether the school had been "founded on principles that are prejudicial or biased" but said it had an open admissions policy since he had joined the school in 1970. "We'd like to have more blacks enrolled," he said. "Our problem is that we only get two or three applications a year."

The school added a new $150,000 building wing in 1970. In 1977, the senior class bought a used double-decker bus at auction for $601 ($3,193 today) and converted it for use as a campus lounge. In 1979, the 48-acre campus expanded to 75 acres.

In 2019, the school opened the Beck Family Research Center, which includes classrooms made of recycled shipping containers. In 2020, the school opened the 20,000-square-foot, $7.5 million Beck Family Innovation Center for the school's iTHINK curriculum. The center includes an aquarium, science labs, administrative offices, a common room, a coffee shop, and an art gallery.

== Academics ==
The school, as of the 2022-2023 academic year, offers 28 Advanced Placement classes. The SAT average for the class of 2021 was 1278, compared to the state-wide average of 999 and national average of 1058. The ACT average for the class of 2021 was 26.5, compared to the state-wide average of 20.1 and national average of 20.6.

== Student body ==
In 2022, the school had a student population of 1,051. Almost 30 percent of the student body was made up of minorities from various cultures and ethnicities. Some 6% of the student body was Black in a county whose population was 30% Black.

== Accreditations ==
- Southern Association of Colleges and Schools (SACS), since 1978
- Florida Council of Independent Schools (FCIS), since the mid-1970s
- Florida Kindergarten Council
- Southern Association of Independent Schools (SAIS)
- Florida High School Athletic Association (FHSAA)
- National Association of College Admissions Counselors (NACAC)
- Association of College Counselors in Independent Schools (ACCIS)
- Southern Association of College Admissions Counselors (SACAC)
- National Career Development Association (NCDA)

== Athletics ==
The Maclay Marauders participate in the Florida High School Athletic Association. The athletic teams have combined for 36 state titles and the school has been named the Sunshine State Top 3A/4A Private School Athletic Program in Florida 10 times.

Sports offered by Maclay School include:

- Boys: lacrosse, baseball, football, soccer, tennis, basketball, golf, cross country, swimming, weightlifting, track and field
- Girls: volleyball, soccer, lacrosse, tennis, basketball, cross country, golf, swimming, weightlifting, track and field

== Notable alumni ==
- Hudson Swafford, professional golfer on the PGA Tour
- Seth Roberts, former professional football player NFL
- Allison Miller, actress
- Liz Landers, journalist and news correspondent
- Mark Joseph Stern, journalist
- Nick Fowler, author and musician
