= A Thing (or Two) About Curtis and Camilla =

Novel (2002)

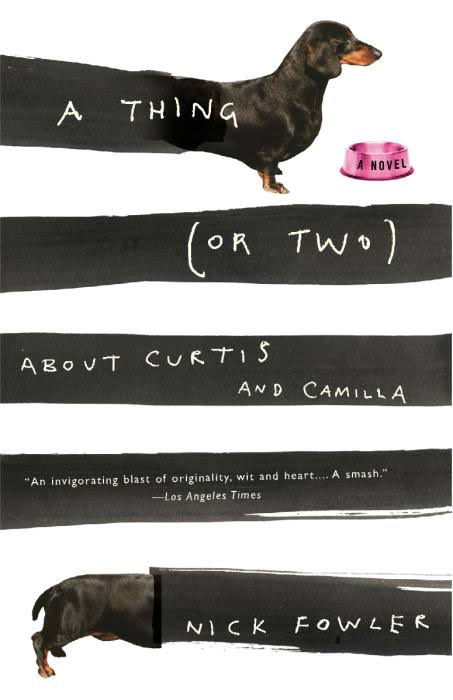
- U.S. Paperback Cover for A Thing (Or Two) About Curtis and Camilla
- Author: Nick Fowler
- Language: English
- Subject: Novel
- Genre: Christian
- Publisher: Pantheon
- Publication date: 2002
- Publication place: United States

A Thing (or Two) About Curtis and Camilla is the first novel by author Nick Fowler. It was published in 2002 and follows the life of a rocker and his girlfriend.

== Synopsis ==
In 2002, Fowler transitioned from the music industry to publishing with the release of his critically acclaimed A Thing (or Two) About Curtis and Camilla. The novel follows a rocker and his girlfriend, who works as a publicist. The hip romance follows the trials and tribulations of a wounded man pining for his partner. The downtrodden middle-class man is carefully explored by Fowler, who sums up relationship issues in a cold post-modern world in this compelling love story.

== Reception ==
The New York Times Book Review complimented Fowler's creative writing style, with short mini-chapters and footnotes to keep the reader's interest. The troubling characters are relatable in today's society and according to the NY Times review, make this a "ruefully funny novel." The review compared Fowler to Salinger, Fitzgerald and Hemingway.

The Los Angeles Times called Fowler's novel "a smash", an "irresistibly melodic debut" that "resonates like a perfect pop song", while the Tallahassee Democrat observed "few novels, let alone first ones, deliver such wisdom with as much talent, humor, and emotional force." While likening it to the novel, Harper Lee's To Kill a Mockingbird. Entertainment Weekly noted Fowler's "strong eye for the awkward interactions between the sexes," while The Orlando Sentinel said "...this love story is almost too good," hailing it as "...a tribute to the human spirit." Time Out London called the book "a deliriously funny first novel" with "genius observations." Joanne Harris, author of number-one UK bestseller Chocolat, called Fowler's roman à clef "Terrific--full of passion and energy, but at the same time literary, quirky and with the same oblique and self-mocking charm that makes Breakfast at Tiffany's such a hit."
