= Title This =

TV game show

The Kostabi Show, formerly known as Title This, Name That Painting and Paint That Naming, is a television game show where art critics and celebrities compete to title paintings by Mark Kostabi for cash awards.

Participants have included Ornette Coleman, Glen Matlock, Tommy Ramone, Lala Brooks, May Pang, Michel Gondry, Tony Middleton, Mark Bego, Randy Jones (of the Village People), Taylor Mead, Sylvia Miles, Ron Saint-Germain, Gary Indiana, Nicole Eisenman, Walter Robinson, Lee Klein, and Victor Bockris. The Kostabi Show has also featured guest musical performances by Ornette Coleman, Glen Matlock, Uncle Monk, Randy Jones, Derek Storm, Tony Middleton, The Willowz, The She Wolves and Glint.

From Lisa Paul Streitfeld's review in NY Arts of Thomas McEvilley's new book: The Triumph of Anti-Art: Conceptual and Performance Art in the Formation of Postmodernism:

"...Mark Kostabi's cynical conceptual art performance piece on his Manhattan cable television show where he invites critics to title his non-art objects (which proclaim their sole importance in not being painted by the artist). Those who once had a crucial role as adversary are now participants in the celebrity-obsessed shadow that has swallowed up authenticity in art. Kostabi has taken out a full-page ad in Art Forum as proof of this public triumph of the inauthentic. Is this public undermining of the critical apparatus the logical conclusion of Anti-Art?"
