= Ishtar (singer) =

French-Israeli vocalist (born 1968)

Ishtar אישתאר
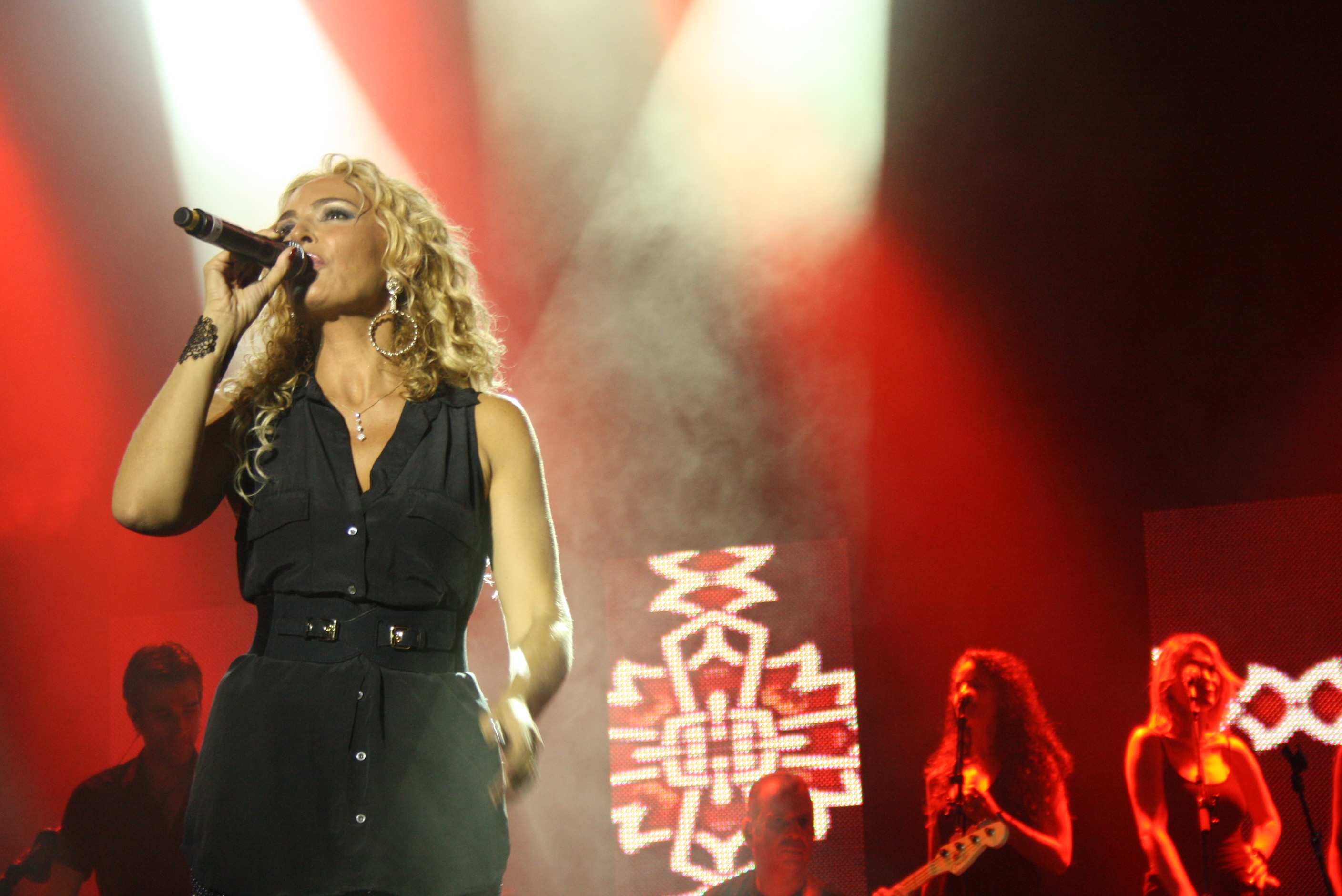
- Ishtar performing in 2010

Background information
- Born: Esther Zach; 10 November 1968 (age 57); Kiryat Ata, Israel
- Genres: Arabic pop music, pop, dance, rock, world music, flamenco
- Occupations: Singer, songwriter
- Years active: 1996–present
- Labels: Atoll Music Paris, Warner Music Group
- Website: Official site

Esther "Eti" Zach (Hebrew: אסתר "אתי" זך, known by her stage name Ishtar (אישתאר), is a French-Israeli vocalist best known for her work as the front vocalist of the French-based band Alabina, and her solo pop hits such as "C'est la vie", "Last Kiss", "Horchat HaEkaliptus" and "Habibi (Sawah)".

== Early life ==
Esther Zach was born on 10 November 1968 in Kiryat Ata, near Haifa, and was raised in Israel. She was born to an Egyptian-Jewish mother and a Moroccan-Jewish father, who had immigrated to Israel earlier. She speaks Hebrew, Arabic, English and French. She sings in Arabic, Hebrew, French, Spanish, Bulgarian, Russian, and English. In addition, she says she "half-speaks Moroccan Arabic".

Zach began performing in clubs at age 14 and continued even while enrolled in the IDF. She chose to use the stage name "Ishtar", the name of a Mesopotamian goddess, after what her given name sounded like with her grandmother's "Egyptian accent".

It was around this time a friend asked her to join her in France. She soon fell in love with the country and decided to make it her home.

== Career ==
=== Alabina years ===
At the age of 23, Ishtar moved to France and began to sing in clubs. She had her own group named Alef. She also performed as a backup vocalist for several famous artist and French singers such as Julien Clerc. In France, she was discovered by a producer who loved her voice. He introduced her to Los Niños de Sara. She joined the group as a lead vocalist and together they performed under the name Alabina.

Alabina soon became a worldwide success charting in the top 10 and top 40 several times in the US alone.

Alabina had found success mixing Flamenco, Arabic, Pop, and Dance sounds. Los Niños de Sara usually sang in Spanish while Ishtar would sing in Spanish, Arabic, French, Hebrew, or a mix of the languages – several songs were sung in Spanish and Arabic.

The message of peace and reconciliation between religions and cultures with modern and authentic rhythms with various cultural influences. Ishtar herself sings in Arabic, French, English, Spanish, Russian and Hebrew. The band enjoys great success in Europe and the United States, Latin America, Australia, India and various Arab countries in the second half of the 1990s and the early 2000s with the hit that was responsible for her meteoric rise around the world, "Alabina". Her debut album reached high chart positions in multiple regions, and she became the first Israeli singer to appear on music charts in countries such as Egypt, Lebanon, Morocco, and Tunisia.

In 1998, Ishtar and her band accompanied Carlos Santana and his band on his tour in France as an opening act. That same year, the band came to Caesarea for a rare and unique performance. Between 1996-2000, Ishtar and her band performed worldwide and crossed the globe length and breadth. The band participated in many festivals such as Wolf Trap in the US and New York in front of an audience of 150,000 Summer Stage. In Australia, India, Europe, Latin America and throughout the United States. As the daughter of a Moroccan father, Ishtar was a favorite of the Moroccan royal family and was invited several times to the Moroccan royal house to perform for them.

In the same year 1998-1999, the band released its third album "Sahara" in which the composer and singer Michael Sembello writes the song "Sahara". The song was recorded in his private studio recording at Michael Sembello's house in Beverly Hills.

=== Solo career ===
In 2000, Sony Columbia signed Ishtar to a contract and released her first album as a solo singer. The album was called "Ishtar". Starting in 2000, the two parts of the band began to develop separate careers while simultaneously maintaining the framework of the Alabina band and joint performances around the world. The album was arranged by the French musician Jacques Venerous (Cr.), who also composed some of the compositions for the album. In this album, Ishtar renewed "Horchat Hai Caliptus", written by Naomi Shemer, for the first time, and achieved great success worldwide. In this album, Ishtar wrote the hit "Last Kiss", which became a hit in many countries such as Russia, Greece, Bulgaria, Armenia, and more. In 2000, Ishtar wrote the theme song "C'est La Vie" for the film "La Vérité Si Je Mens", which is considered a historic blockbuster in France, Switzerland, Canada and Belgium. In this year (2000), Ishtar is asked to perform a duet with Turkish singer Burak Aziz and together they performed the anthem for the Turkish football team Galatasaray.

Despite Alabina's success, after two albums Ishtar decided to do a solo project of her own (though she was still a member of the group); Los Niños de Sara also began to release CDs of their own.

In November 2000, Ishtar, La Voix d'Alabina (The Voice of Alabina) was released. It stepped up the Oriental pop sound while mixing in some traditional Arabic sounds and dance beats. Nine out of the twelve songs were mainly in French though Arabic, Spanish, English, and Hebrew were mixed in on various songs (for example, Last Kiss was in English). Several of the tracks found dance floor success, including Last Kiss.

Ishtar also gave a visit to her fans in Israel, where she hosted a few television shows, singing duos with local stars such as Pablo Rosenberg, Avihu Medina, and David D'Or.

Ishtar continued to tour the world with Alabina for the next few years as she worked on her second album, Truly (Emet), which was released in August 2003 this time with most of the songs being in Hebrew. However she decided to sing more songs in mixes of Arabic and Hebrew to show that there could be harmony between the two cultures. Truly (Emet) was again a dance floor success especially with the songs C'est La Vie, and Last Kiss.

A few more performances were done with Alabina, though as of 2005, the group had seemed to disband by no longer actively performing or releasing new music.

Ishtar's third album, Je Sais D'où Je Viens (I know where I come from) was released in November 2005. This time the music was still Oriental pop, however much less dance. More hip hop-type beats were stirred in with the Arabic music. Most of the songs were sung in Arabic, four were sung in French, and a few in English, while Spanish and Hebrew could be found throughout the album. Again she found dance success with such singles as Habibi (Sawah), which for the first time in her career featured rapper JMI Sissoko.

Shortly after a greatest hits CD, The Alabina Years, was released, featuring a mix of Ishtar's solo hits, her Alabina hits, and some new English tracks as well.

In 2005, Ishtar joins a gypsy band called Chanelas and together they release an album called "Ragga Boom" which contains two international hits: "Ragga Boom", and the hit "Habibi (Sawah)" in which she reprises the song "Sawah" by Egyptian singer Abdel Halim Hafez in a reggae style in which she collaborates with rapper Jimmy Sissoko. The latter entered the charts in the Arab world from the first week and maintained its position in first place for 3 months on the Rotana music channel. In 2007, Ishtar gives birth to her twins Shira and Levi and takes a one-year break from the stage. In 2009, she released a duet with Kobi Peretz called "Yahad" (Together), which won To great success and the Big Apple Music Award. In 2011, she performs the version of the song together in Russian with the tenor singer Nicolai Baskov, a song that becomes a success in countries such as Russia, Uzbekistan, Dagestan and Azerbaijan. Ishtar is invited to perform in these countries and achieves great success. That year, she released a song called "Haor" (The Light), which she herself was also a co-composer of and is coming to tour Israel. Ishtar played a central role in Benny Torati's film, "Ballade for the Weeping Spring" which was released in 2012. In it, she plays a disabled singer and performs the film's theme song. Ishtar continues to perform in the United States and collaborates on stage with well-known stars such as Lionel Richie and David Foster. In 2012, Ishtar records her album "7", which features the American super producer Seven Aurelius, who is responsible for producing the song "Lady Revolver". In 2014, she participated in the series "6 Mothers" alongside other celebrities. In 2016, Ishtar signed a collaboration with the television and production company TF1, which led to the production of the album "Baila" and its first single is "À Paris", written by Doron Medley. The album was a success and reached number 5 on the French charts within a week. In 2018, Ishtar returned to live in Israel with her family.

In 2024, for the first time in six years, Ishtar released the song "Child (L'Enfant)". The song, which is a mix of Hebrew and French, was written and composed by Ishtar, Or Milstock and Omri Kasten and was written inspired by October 7. A song that expresses hope and rebuilding.

In 2025, Ishtar remade the song "Frozen" by Madonna in the Arabic version called "Enta".

== Discography ==
=== Albums ===
(Only solo CDs are listed)

- The Voice of Alabina (2000)
- Truly (Emet) (2003)
- Je Sais d'où Je Viens (2005)
- The Alabina Years
- Best of Ishtar Alabina
- 7 (2012)
- Baila (2016)

=== Singles ===
- "Lolaï" (1997)
- "Last Kiss" (2000)
- "C'est La Vie" (2001)
- "Ragga Boom" (2005)
- "Habibi (Sawah)" (2005)
- "Yahad" (2009)
- "Mi Amor" (2012)
- "À Paris" (2016)
- Baila
- Ça va craquer
- La Vida Es Un Carnaval
- Amore de mis amore
- Pour toi et moi
- Наши Ночи Наши Дни (Alen Begl & Ishtar Alabina)

=== DVDs ===
- Alabina on Tour 1997–2000 (released 2002)

== See also ==
- Alabina
- Los Niños de Sara
- Alen Begl
