= The Tufts Observer =

Student newsmagazine of Tufts University

Tufts Observer
- The Tufts Observer, October 1, 2012
- Editor-in-Chief: Sabah Lokhandwala
- Categories: News magazine
- Frequency: Bi-weekly
- Circulation: 1,500
- Publisher: TigerPress (Northampton, MA)
- First issue: 1895
- Company: Tufts University
- Country: United States
- Language: English
- Website: www.tuftsobserver.org

The Tufts Observer, founded as the Tufts Weekly, is an undergraduate student newsmagazine published at Tufts University. First published in 1895 Tufts' first student newspaper, the Observer is the oldest student publication on campus. The Tufts Weekly was renamed the Tufts Observer in 1969. Observer staff currently work out of the Media Advocacy Board (MAB) Lab, located on the second floor of Curtis Hall on College Avenue.

== Format ==
The publication is a tri-weekly, 32-page full-color magazine that is divided into seven sections: Feature, News, Opinions, Arts & Culture, Campus, Voices, and Poetry & Prose. The rotating editorial board chooses a theme for every issue, and every semester, the magazine devotes itself entirely to poetry and prose pieces with its "Creative" (Fall) and "Literary" (Spring) issues. These special editions feature student-written short stories and poems set against striking photography, original artworks, and graphic design.

== History ==
The Observer was founded in 1895 as the Tufts Weekly and would later bill itself as Tufts' "newspaper of record." Early issues prominently featured sports scores as well as campus news. The first issue was dated Tuesday, October 8, 1895, and was eight pages long. This issue contained an editorial titled "The New Departure" which stated, "With this number we begin the work of Tufts' first weekly. We realize the uncertainty of our position, the importance of the work, and the many difficulties attending it; but, believing that such a sheet is needed in our college, we step forth boldly, asking the attention and consideration of all connected with Tufts College in any capacity whatever."

The Weekly did not officially change its name to "The Tufts Observer" until the late 1960s, under the management of Editor-in-Chief Glenn Durfee, to reflect the paper's publication schedule. The paper also began to occasionally publish more than weekly because of major news events on campus. In the fall of 1969 the Observer, under Editor-in-Chief Phil Primack, was sometimes published as often as four times a week. In 2001, the editorial board of the Observer voted to adopt the newsmagazine format that the publication exists in today.

=== Controversy ===
In February 1987, Ian Kremer, a 19-year-old Observer journalist, was allegedly beaten because of anti-racist activist articles he wrote in the news magazine. The assailants allegedly called Kramer "nigger lover, jew boy and Commie pinko". The story was reported in Boston-area and other national newspapers as well as in the Associated Press. Several days after the alleged attack, eyewitnesses refuted the assault claims and Tufts President Jean Mayer also denied the allegation, saying that, "It is absolutely clear that no attack took place at the time and place that Kremer said". Kremer filed a libel suit against The Tufts Daily, Tufts police officials, and Jean Mayer in April 1987 because of the scandal. Later in 1987 Kremer transferred to another university and Tufts settled the case out of court on undisclosed terms in November 1989.

=== Today ===
Today, the Observer produces tri-weekly issues, distributed on Monday mornings throughout Tufts' Medford-Somerville campus. In addition to a feature article and a photo inset each issue, there are six other regular sections: news, opinions, arts & culture, campus, poetry & prose, and voices.
