= The Tufts Daily =

American student newspaper

- Where you read it first
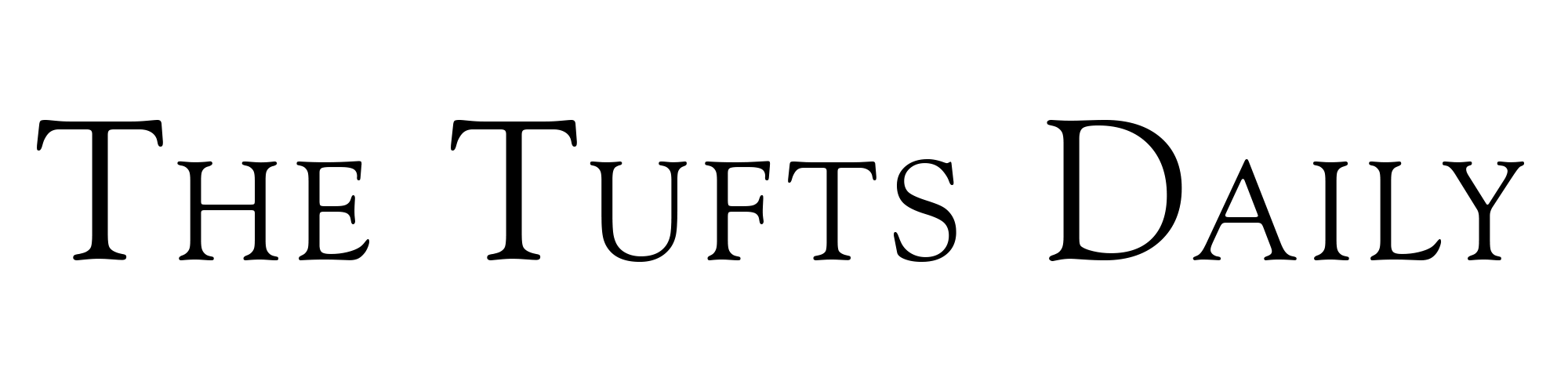
- The Tufts Daily, April 14, 2022
- Type: Daily student newspaper
- Format: Tabloid
- Publisher: TCI Press
- Editor-in-chief: Julian Glickman
- Associate editor: Maya Godard; Julia Segal
- Managing editor: Olivia Bye; Sadie Roraback-Meagher
- Directors of production and business: Angelina Moy and Joshua Solomon; Julia Critz
- Founded: February 25, 1980
- Headquarters: 474 Boston Avenue, Medford, Massachusetts 02155
- Website: tuftsdaily.com

The Tufts Daily, known on campus as the Daily, is the student newspaper of record at Tufts University in Medford, Massachusetts. The paper covers news, arts and sports both on campus and in the greater Boston area and allows members of the Tufts community to submit opinion pieces about campus, local and global issues. Unlike other student organizations and publications at Tufts, the Daily is financially self-sustaining and does not receive funding from the university.

The Tufts Daily has consistently ranked as one of the best college newspapers in the United States.

== History ==
The first issue of The Tufts Daily was published on February 25, 1980. During the Daily's first two decades, it was engaged in competition with a weekly campus newspaper, the Tufts Observer. The two newspapers co-existed until 2001, when The Observer changed to a biweekly news magazine format. Since then, the Daily has been the newspaper of record at Tufts.

The Daily made national headlines in November 2017 after publishing a series of op-eds written by Camilo A. Caballero, a graduate student at The Fletcher School of Law and Diplomacy, which voiced support for a student-led petition to remove former White House Communications Director Anthony Scaramucci from The Fletcher School's Board of Advisors. Caballero wrote that Scaramucci's "career and ideals are diametrically opposed to those ideas and who sullies the vision of the University." Claiming defamation, Scaramucci threatened to sue the Daily if it did not retract parts of the op-eds and demanded that both the paper and Caballero issue public apologies. Scaramucci resigned from the Board of Advisors on November 28 after the paper refused to comply with his demands, stating, "I thought it would be better for the school and better for me personally if we parted ways."

On November 1, 2018, the Daily broke a national story about the appearance of posters linked to white nationalism on college campuses across the United States. The paper reported that the posters, which were affixed to get-out-the-vote signs on Tufts' campus, bore the phrase "It's okay to be white" — a slogan adopted and promoted by white nationalists, including former Grand Wizard of the Ku Klux Klan David Duke.

The Daily published an investigative report in November 2018 detailing over $22 million in donations to Tufts from charitable organizations with histories of funding academically and racially controversial research, including the Charles Koch Foundation, the John Templeton Foundation, and the Sarah Scaife Foundation. The investigative series, titled "Dark Money at Tufts," cited examples in which the organizations have been given influence over hiring decisions and academic curricula after donating to other universities and reported that Tufts administrators and faculty are "often unaware of, or uninterested in, donors' philanthropic record and relevant interests."

In March 2022, Tufts Daily Deputy News Editor Emily Thompson and Editor in Chief Alexander Janoff were sued by local landlord and orthodontist Mouhab Rizkallah over Thompson's reporting on a protest against Rizkallah's negligent treatment of his tenants. Rizkallah accused Thompson and Janoff of defamation, saying Thompson's article misrepresented the comment he gave to the Daily for her story. Thompson and Janoff maintained that the article was accurate as published, and the suit was ultimately dismissed with prejudice. Prior to dismissal, it garnered coverage from the Boston Globe and Teen Vogue, among other publications.

The Daily published the first edition of The Tufts Daily Magazine on December 5, 2024. Its founding editor is Henry Chandonnet.

On March 26, 2024, the Daily published an op-ed co-authored by Rümeysa Öztürk, Fatima Rahman, Genesis Perez and Nicholas Ambeliotis. Öztürk was later arrested by federal agents from the United States Department of Homeland Security (DHS) in Somerville, Massachusetts on March 25, 2025. She was held in Louisiana for 45 days until a Vermont judge ordered her release on bail on May 9, 2025. An immigration judge later terminated her removal proceedings.

== Sections ==
The Daily has six sections of original written content (News, Features, Sports, Arts, Science and Investigative), as well as an Opinion section that includes op-ed submissions from community members, bylined content from Opinions staffers and editorials written by the paper's editorial board. The Daily has three multimedia sections — audio, video and photo — along with a production department that contains the layout, copy, graphics and social media sections.

=== News, features, arts, sports, science and investigative ===
The Daily's news section reports on Tufts events, campus politics, student life and breaking news. It also covers Tufts' host communities of Medford and Somerville.

The features section publishes in-depth explorations of student life and trends in academia, at Tufts and nationwide. It also publishes profiles of Tufts faculty and students. The section typically runs one feature-length article and one column each day.

The arts section began as a single article in the paper's first issue in 1980 and has since expanded to run three to four articles each day, covering on- and off-campus events. From 1987 until 2002, Arts ran its "Weekender" supplement once a week as an insert magazine. The Weekender was later relaunched as part of the paper, rather than an insert, and typically includes a lengthy profile of a local event, exhibition, or artist. It appears inside Thursday's paper.

The sports section provides in-depth coverage of the school's varsity teams and occasionally reports on club and intramural sports. The section regularly profiles Tufts athletes and explores issues and trends in major professional sports in its weekly columns.

The Science section was established in fall 2021 to cover new developments in public health and scientific research on Tufts' campuses, in the greater Boston area and beyond. The section publishes online only and is known for in-depth features as well as "bite-size" articles.

The investigative section produces comprehensive, long-form coverage of significant topics of interest, which often takes months to produce. In September 2019, the section covered a 2018 meeting among presidents of Boston-area colleges and the Saudi crown prince, focusing on the previously undisclosed attendance of Tufts University President Anthony Monaco. In 2022, the section published the results of a months-long investigation into Teaching Assistant pay discrepancies at Tufts, which found that TAs in some departments are vastly underpaid, including at least one below the university minimum wage.

=== Opinion and editorial ===
The Daily's opinion section accepts submissions from all members of the Tufts community on any campus, national, or global issue. It has become an important platform for campus debate, with particularly controversial pieces often leading to a series of back-and-forth op-eds. It was known as the Viewpoints section until fall 2007, when it merged with the Editorial department. The Viewpoints section was then relaunched in spring 2021 as subcategory of Opinion, and includes Opinion content written by staff or contributing writers.

The paper has traditionally run several editorials per week. Editorials are unsigned and, as such, represent the opinions of the Daily.

=== Audio, video, and photo ===
The Daily's audio section launched in 2018 and produces multiple podcasts, including The Rewind, Take Town, and A Blight on the Hill.

The video section releases videos on the Daily's YouTube channel. The Daily's Newsroom Concert Series, featuring performances from Tufts' own Veronica Stewart-Frommer of Melt and the members of Emperor Jones, was launched in spring 2022.

The photo section produces regular content, including daily photos that accompany articles and monthly photo spreads. Photo stories were launched in fall 2024.

=== Business, alumni liaison ===
The business department is responsible for print, digital, social media, and newsletter advertisement sales, supplying the Daily's main source of income.

The alumni liaisons coordinate fundraising and journalism education initiatives with the Tufts Daily Alumni Council, which was formed in 2020.

== Distribution ==
The Daily partners with the news aggregator applications Apple News and NewsBreak.

During the 2020–21 academic year, the Daily reduced print production to at most once per week due to the COVID-19 pandemic. However, the Daily continued to layout the paper nightly for online reading on Issuu. Due to the change in print schedule, the Daily focused on producing special edition issues, including the 2020 Election Guide, Jumbo Month edition, Commencement edition, and COVID-19 at Tufts: A Year in Review.

During the 2021–2022 academic year, the Daily increased print production to biweekly and continued printing special issues, such as the Community at Tufts edition and the 2022 Daily Week edition celebrating the paper's 42nd anniversary.

As of 2025, the Daily prints on a weekly basis.

== Notable alumni ==
- Daniel Barbarisi, The Athletic senior editor, former New York Yankees beat reporter for The Wall Street Journal
- Carrie Battan, The New Yorker staff writer
- Christopher Bodeen, Associated Press Beijing correspondent
- Kyle Chayka, The New Yorker staff writer and cultural critic
- Geoff Edgers, The Washington Post national arts reporter
- Bob Goodman, director of user experience and strategy at 829 Studios
- Patrick Healy, The New York Times Deputy Editor of Opinion
- Karen Israel, producer for Dateline NBC
- David J. Kramer, former United States Assistant Secretary of State for Democracy, Human Rights, and Labor
- Elizabeth Landers, journalist and news correspondent
- Tony Massarotti, former Boston Globe sportswriter and Boston sports radio personality
- Pierre Omidyar, founder of eBay
- Anthony Scaramucci, former White House Communications Director
- Caroline Schaefer, former executive editor of Us Weekly
- Remy Stern, New York Post chief digital officer and former editor-in-chief of Gawker
- Chris Stone, L.A. Times Executive Sports Editor, former editor-in-chief of Sports Illustrated
- Colin Woodard, author, POLITICO contributing editor and writer at the Portland Press Herald and Maine Sunday Telegram
- Matthew Sage, independent journalist
