= Kostabi World Trade Center =

Proposed unbuilt skyscraper in Manhattan, New York

General information
- Status: Proposed
- Type: Mixed-use (office, residential, showroom)
- Architectural style: Postmodern
- Location: Manhattan, New York City, New York, United States
- Construction started: 2030
- Completed: 2038

Height
- Height: 2,000 ft (610 m)

Technical details
- Structural system: Highrise with Sphere elements
- Material: Glass
- Floor count: 160
- Floor area: 200,000 sq ft (19,000 m^{2})

Design and construction
- Architect: Eli Attia Architects
- Developer: Mark Kostabi

Website
- Official Website

The Kostabi World Trade Center is an envisioned building in New York City, New York. Designed by Mark Kostabi in the 1990s, it would have had 160 floors and would have been 2,000 feet (609.6 m) high. It was one of many ideas for the World Trade Center site. The floor plates at the base of the building are designed to encompass more than 200,000 square feet. It was proposed in the late 1990s as the world's tallest building by developer Mark Kostabi.
