= Liz Landers =

American journalist (born 1990)

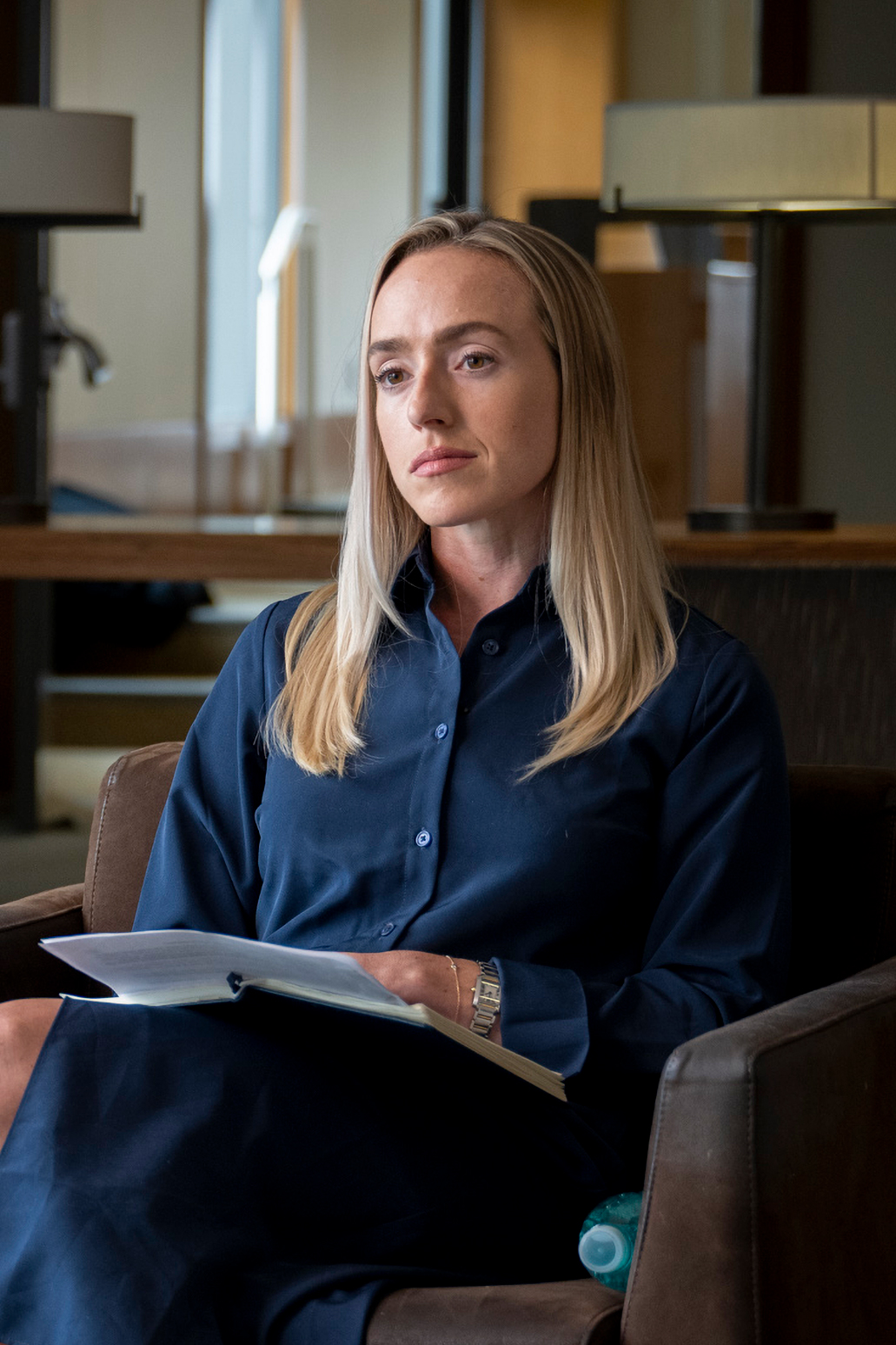
- Landers interviewing DHS Secretary Alejandro Mayorkas in July 2021
- Born: Elizabeth Landers; August 11, 1990 (age 36); Tallahassee, Florida, U.S.
- Education: Maclay School
- Alma mater: Tufts University (BA)
- Occupations: Journalist; news correspondent
- Years active: 2013-present
- Employer: PBS News
- Spouse: Jim Acosta (m. 2026)

Elizabeth Landers (born August 11, 1990) is an American journalist who has worked for CNN, Vice News, and E.W. Scripps. She is the White House correspondent for PBS News Hour.

== Early life and education ==
Elizabeth Landers was born on August 11, 1990. Her mother Pamela Forrester is a former television news anchor for WCTV and The Florida Channel. Her father Joseph W. Landers Jr. is a lawyer who worked as an environmental adviser in the Governor's Office during Reubin Askew's term as Florida governor. He also served as Secretary of the Florida Department of Environmental Regulation and executive director of the Florida Department of Natural Resources in the 1970s during Askew's term. Landers recalled the 2000 presidential election "when the entire national and international media descended on Tallahassee when the hanging chad happened" as a catalyst for an interest in politics.

From 2009 to 2013, Landers studied for a Bachelor of Arts degree in political science at Tufts University. While at Tufts, she competed in pole vault for the Tufts Jumbos track and field team. Landers also wrote on fashion for the Tufts student newspaper The Tufts Daily. From September 2012 to May 2013, Landers interned in the office of Massachusetts state representative Carl Sciortino where she investigated the use of conversion therapy in Massachusetts and helped draft legislation to outlaw it.

== Career ==
=== Early career ===
In August 2007, as a teenage writer, Landers interviewed Illinois Senator Barack Obama during his 2008 presidential bid when his candidacy was considered improbable. She also wrote on fashion and lifestyle for Glamour and Cosmopolitan while an online editorial intern. Landers wrote two articles for The Daily Beast on culture and fashion in 2014 and 2015.

=== CNN (2013-2019) ===
Landers joined CNN as a freelance news assistant in June 2013. She covered Senator Bernie Sanders' 2016 presidential campaign for CNN. Travelling with the Sanders campaign was a "dream gig" according to Landers. Following the end of the Sanders campaign, Landers became the White House Producer for CNN in January 2017, covering White House and Capitol Hill affairs as a news correspondent.

=== Vice News (2019-2023) ===
In April 2019, Landers joined Vice News as a guest anchor and political correspondent on the show Vice News Tonight. It was reported in March 2021 that she had been promoted to chief political correspondent at Vice News. Throughout the 2022 midterm election campaign, Landers covered efforts by Trump-endorsed candidates who deny the legitimacy of the 2020 presidential election to run for key election oversight positions like Secretaries of State, Attorneys General, and Governors. On April 27, 2023, Landers was included in the layoffs at Vice as the company cut 100 jobs and cancelled its Vice News Tonight program. She won an Emmy Award and Webby Award for her coverage at Vice News.

=== Scripps News ===
In 2024, she was appointed National Security Correspondent at Scripps News.

=== PBS News ===
On August 12, 2025, it was announced that Landers would become White House Correspondent for the PBS News Hour, beginning in September.

== Accolades ==
Year	Association	Category	Nominated work	Result	Ref.
2021	Emmy Awards	Outstanding Newscast	Vice News Tonight	Won	
