= Khalil (band) =

South African R&B band

Khalil lewis
- Origin: Johannesburg, South Africa
- Genres: R&B; South African music World Music
- Years active: 1995–present
- Labels: Gresham Records; LoveCat Music
- Members: Kay; B-King; Tshepo; J of K
- Website: Artist site

Khalil or Khalil Lewis is an R&B vocal quartet based in Johannesburg, South Africa. Their debut album "Let Me In" sold over 50,000 copies, earning the CD platinum status in South Africa. All four members of the band were born and raised in Temba, "Pretoria", and grew up in the church.

The band formed in 1995 and was later discovered by Carl Eaton (manager of South African stars Mandoza and Ernie Smith, Pitch Black Afro). In 2000 the band released their debut EP, Khalil, featuring the smash hit “Mama Said,” which quickly made it to Chart Breaker of the Week and #25 on YFM’s Top 100 singles for the year. The EP also spawned the hit single “Feel the Vibe” (featuring Loyiso), which was on Metro FM’s Local Top 20 for more than 12 weeks. The following year the group was nominated for two Metro FM awards for Best Duo/Group and Best R&B, and were featured in Cosmopolitan and Drum magazines, among others.

In 2005 Khalil signed to the David Gresham Record Company, a large indie label in South Africa. Their debut album, Let Me In, features harmonious rhythms, intelligently naughty lyrics, and tight production work. Guest rappers and singers include Ziggy, Aluta, Ill Scientist, and Capsolys. The album’s first single, “Reed Dancin’,” hit # 1 on South Africa’s FM Top 20 in 2005. in 2006 the album was released by LoveCat Music in the U.S.A.

Khalil has performed with international jazz and R&B superstars such as Kenny Latimore, Chanté Moore, Erykah Badu, and George Duke. In 2005 the group was nominated for two South African Music Awards, for Best R&B and Best Joined Composition.

== Discography ==
=== Albums ===
- Let Me In (2006)

=== EPs ===
- Khalil 2006
