= La Palabra (musician) =

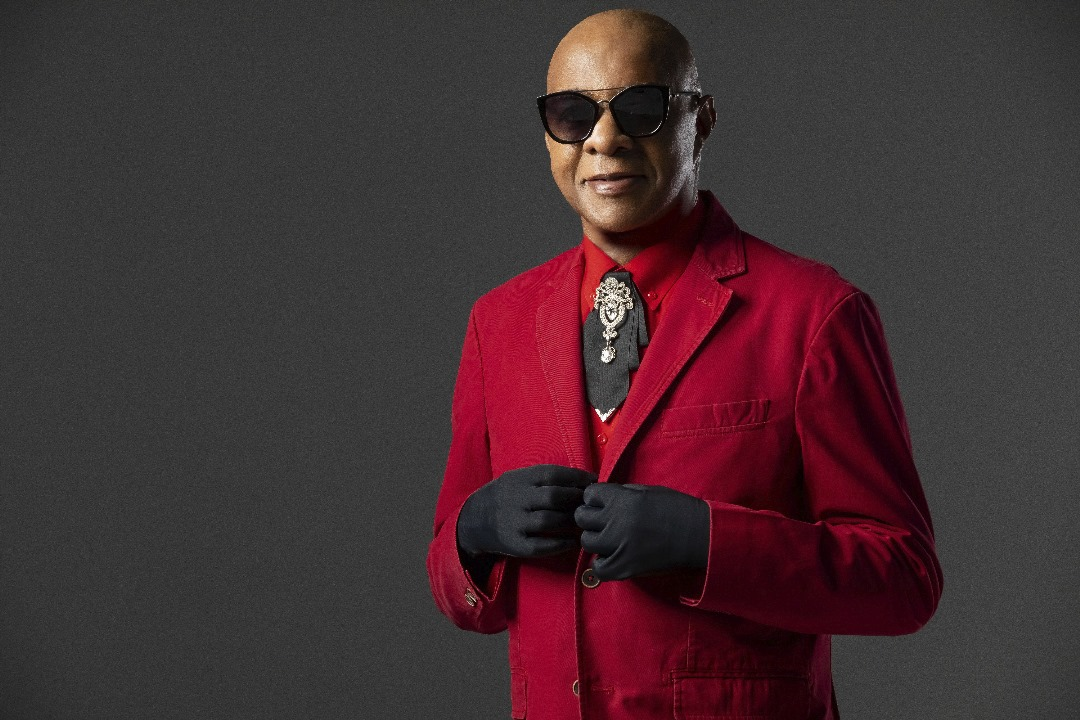
- La Palabra in 2025

Background information
- Also known as: Fito Foster, Orquesta La Palabra
- Born: Rodolfo M. Foster
- Origin: Cuba
- Genres: Afro-Cuban jazz, son montuno, guaracha, Salsa romántica
- Occupations: Songwriter, composer, arranger, producer, band leader, instrument piano
- Instrument: Piano
- Years active: 1951-present
- Labels: Tornillo Records, LoveCat Music
- Formerly of: Sensation 85, Orquesta Versalles, Orquesta La Palabra

La Palabra (born Rodolfo M. Foster in Caimanera, Cuba) is an American bandleader, singer-songwriter, pianist, record producer, and arranger, known for his versatile approach to music, particularly his invention of the Salsa romantica Latin music genre and his signature style of Afro-Cuban-influenced, sensual Latin jazz.

== Early life ==
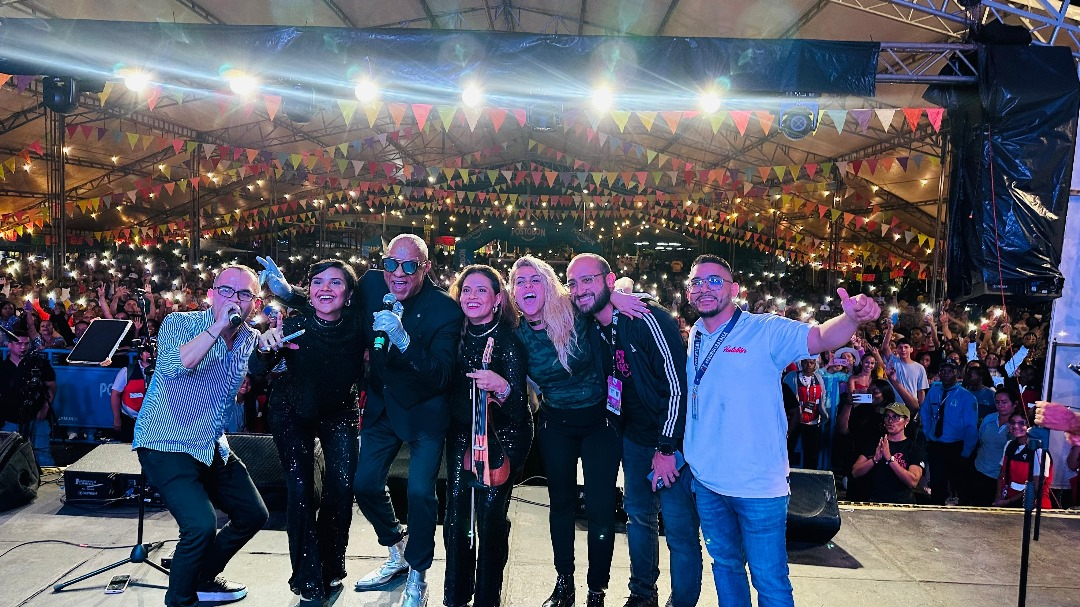
La Palabra at Buga Colombia 2024

La Palabra was born in Caimanera, Cuba, where he developed an early interest in music influenced by traditional Cuban genres and artists such as Orquesta Aragón, Estrellas Cubanas, Orquesta Pello el Afrokán, Tata Guines, and Félix Chappottín. From an early age, he was exposed to all genres of Cuban music.

He began piano lessons at age 11 with the help of his grandmother, inspired by Neno Gonzalez's song "El Cafe" and soon started composing his own arrangements. After winning an amateur music competition, he was invited to attend a state-controlled school of music in Havana, but his family declined, concerned about travel restrictions under Cuba's post-revolutionary government.

In 1966, he moved to New York City, where he joined the band Lalo y La New Yorkina later relocating to Detroit, where he was exposed to Motown, jazz, and R&B. In Detroit, he formed his high school's first integrated band, The Blazers. With this band, he shared the stage with the Jackson 5. His early experiences in Detroit's music scene led to performances with various groups and venues, including El Sol Supper Club, where he mixed Cuban rhythms with soul and rock. By the late 1970s, he was active in Detroit's club circuit, performing alongside artists like Anita Baker, Earl Klugh, and Marcus Belgrave.

== Godfather of Romantic Salsa ==
=== Musical Career and the Rise of Salsa Romántica ===
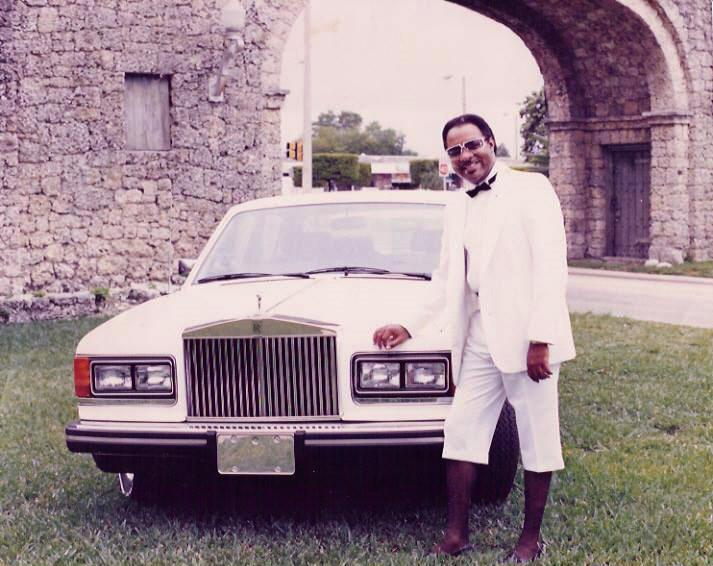
La Palabra 1985

In 1979, members of Stevie Wonder's band saw La Palabra performing with Norma Belle in Detroit and recommended him to Wonder, who invited him to Los Angeles to join a new project, Phoenix Rising. Although the project was still in early development, La Palabra moved west and supported himself by performing locally.

During this time, inspired by romantic hits from artists like Lionel Richie, Roberto Carlos, and Emmanuel, La Palabra began blending Cuban rhythms with romantic ballads, creating a style he called Ballada en Salsa, later known as salsa romántica.

That same year, he partnered with Jesús "El Niño" Alejandro Perez to form Orquesta Versalles, performing in venues like Club Candilejas and the Marina Hotel in Las Vegas. Their 1981 single featured "Me Voy Pa’ Puerto Rico" and "Todo Se Derrumbó" the latter becoming a club favorite.

"Todo Se Derrumbó" attracted music producer Joni Figueras, who proposed an album to showcase the new sound. Although La Palabra couldn't commit due to obligations with Stevie Wonder, Figueras proceeded with the concept, producing Noche Caliente using Louis Ramirez and Ray de la Paz who were later, and inaccurately, credited as salsa romántica pioneers.

After Phoenix Rising was shelved in 1982, La Palabra continued with Orquesta Versalles, releasing a debut album under Profono Records. His salsa version of Lionel Richie's "Lady" became an international dance hit.

In 1984, he moved to Miami with his band, seeking stronger exposure in the Latin music industry.

In 1985, now using the name "La Palabra," he formed a new group, Sensation 85, featuring flautist Nestor Torres and introducing Luis Enrique as a salsa vocalist. The group found success performing at major Miami venues, including Papa Grande and the Copacabana.

Despite growing popularity of salsa romántica, and even as former bandmates signed with major labels, La Palabra himself remained unsigned. Frustrated by the lack of recognition, he stepped away from the music scene in 1988 until his return in 1999, when he returned to Los Angeles.

At present, he's in many countries in Latin America, especially in Colombia.

== Orquesta La Palabra and Latin Jazz ==
In 1999, La Palabra began recording Rap-A-Salsa with Chuck Neustein but paused the project after reconnecting with George Balmaseda, who introduced him to Mel Morrow of Morrowland Records. Morrow offered to finance a new band, leading to the formation of Orquesta La Palabra, with Balmaseda and Angelo Pagan on vocals.

Together, they recorded the album On Fire in Los Angeles, featuring new versions of “Todo Se Derrumbó” and “Lady.” The latter gained international airplay, reviving interest in La Palabra's music across the U.S., Europe, Latin America, and Asia.

In 2003, he released Breakthrough under Tornillo Records. The album included the hit “El Tun Tun de Tu Corazón,” which topped Colombian radio charts for 12 consecutive weeks in 2006. This success led to international tours and performances, including at the 2008 Beijing Olympics, in Beijing, China, He also wrote a song for the city of Shenzhen, titled "I'm Going to Shenzhen" (which was specifically requested by the mayor of Shenzhen) for the opening ceremonies for the city. La Palabra also played at the International Salsa Festival, and the 2008 Salsa Congress in Beijing

La Palabra returned to his Afro-Cuban roots with the 2009 album Musicholic, showcasing a sophisticated blend of traditional Cuban rhythms and Latin jazz influences. His evolving style drew inspiration from legends like Bebo Valdés, Chucho Valdés, and Eddie Palmieri, while honoring the foundations of Afro-Cuban jazz.

== Discography ==
- Earthquake (unreleased), 1974
- "Todo Se Derrumbó" single, 1981
- with Orquesta Versalles:
- with Sensation '85:
- Sensation 85, 1985
- with Orquesta La Palabra:
- On Fire (Morrowland Records), 2000
- Breakthrough (Tornillo Records), 2003
- Musicholic (Tornillo Records), 2009 Estoy En Ti (Tornillo Records,) 2017 Single EL Mejor Momento (Tornillo Records) 2023 Single Angel Desolado (Tornillo Records) 2025

== Sources ==
- "Orquesta Versalles", Diario Las Américas, June 6, 1984, page 9B.
- "Black Cubans: Apart in Two Worlds", The New York Times, December 2, 1987, page 13.
- "Calendar Weekend: La Vida Loca", Los Angeles Times, July 1, 1999, page 6.
- "Salsa de Hollywood para el Mundo", La Opinión, October 18, 2000, page 6B.
- "Palabra and Salsa Romantica", Latin Beat Magazine, October 2001.
- "La Palabra Turns a Concept into An Identity", Sabor Magazine, March 2001, page 30.
- "Salsa Para Apagar La Luz", Al Borde, September 25, 2003.
- "On Deck", Los Angeles WAVE, October 2, 2003.
- "Orquesta La Palabra", Billboard, January 17, 2004.
- "Palabra's Sound Goes On", Latin Beat Magazine, May 2005, page 29.
- "La Palabra: A Taste of Cuba", Estreno de Musica Y Video, December 2005, page 6.
- "Salsa De Hollywood Para El Mundo", 20 De Mayo, April 15, 2006, No. 2384.
- "La Palabra", Que Pasa Bulletin, April 2006.
- "Chango Tiene La Palabra", El País (Cali Colombia), August 2, 2006, page D3.
- "La Palabra por Primera Vez en Cali", Diario Occidente (Cali Colombia), July 28, 2006, page 20.
- "Sazón Cubano en Hollywood", La Voz Libre, November 23, 2006.
