= Misisipi Mike Wolf =

American singer, songwriter and musician

- Also known as: Misisipi Mike
- Born: Michael James Wolf
- Genres: roots rock, country
- Occupations: Musician, singer-songwriter
- Instrument: Guitar
- Years active: 2009–present
- Label: LoveCat Music
- Website: www.instagram.com/misisipi_mike_wolf/

"Misisipi" Mike Wolf is an American singer, songwriter and musician. He grew up in the state of Mississippi, United States, and moved to San Francisco, California as an adult. He currently resides in Duluth, Minnesota. His music has been compared to that of Johnny Cash, Willie Nelson and Waylon Jennings. His music has been featured on nationally broadcast radio and television and has been twice voted as "Best Singer/Songwriter" by readers of the San Francisco Bay Guardian.
