= Gene Pritsker =

Guitarist and rapper (born 1971)

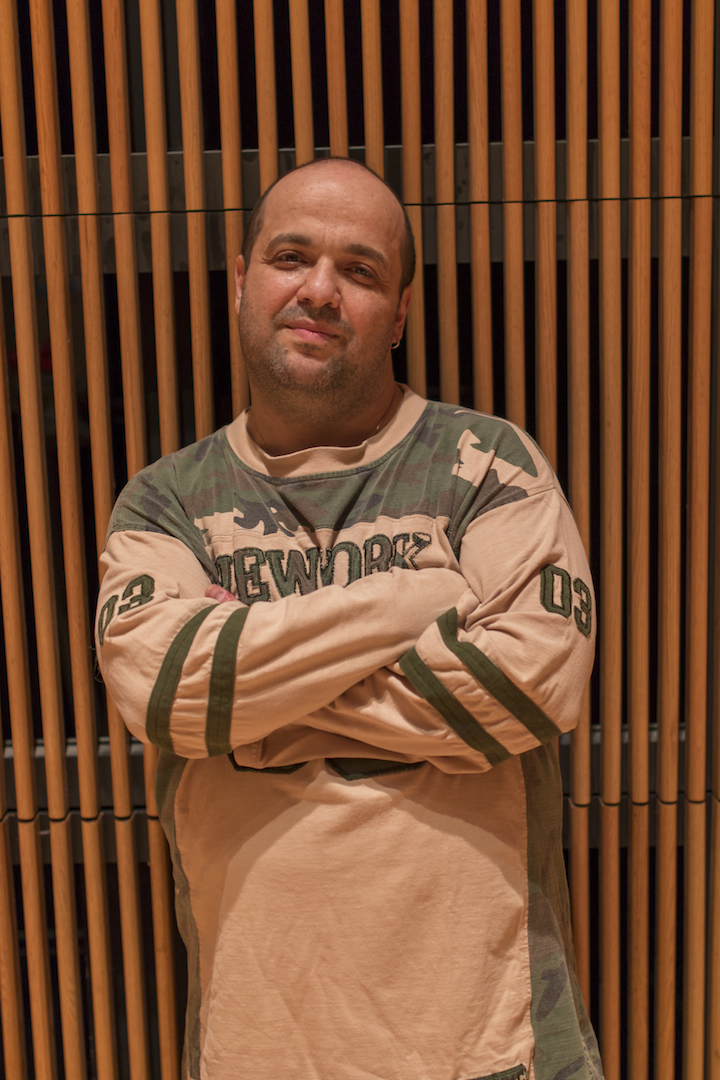

Background information
- Born: 1971 (age 54–55)
- Genres: Various
- Occupations: Composer, guitarist, rapper
- Instrument: Guitar
- Labels: Composers Concordance Records, LoveCat Music, Col Legno, Enja Records, Eutrepe, Wergo, Innova Recordings

Gene Pritsker (born 1971) is a composer, guitarist, rapper and record producer living in New York City. He moved to the United States with his family in 1978 and lived in Sheepshead Bay, Brooklyn. He attended the Manhattan School of Music from 1990 to 1994 where he studied composition with Giampaolo Bracali.

While attending Manhattan School of Music he co-founded the Absolute Ensemble with Kristjan Järvi and formed Sound Liberation, which has released CDs on Col-legno, Composers Concordance Records and Innova Recordings. Pritsker's music has been performed by the Adelaide Symphony Orchestra, MDR Symphony Orchestra, Athens Camarata, Brooklyn Philharmonic and the Berlin Philharmonic. He worked closely with the Austrian-American jazz keyboardist and composer Joe Zawinul and has orchestrated Hollywood movies.

His compositions are published by Falls House Press, Gold Branch Music, Periferia Sheet Music and Calabrese Brothers Music, LLC.

His compositions and performances can be heard on Col Legno, Enja Records, Eutrepe, Wergo, Innova Recordings, Composers' Concordance Records, and Capstone Records labels. He is a member of Broadcast Music, Inc.

== Reception ==
Pritsker contributed to Absolute Bach Reinvented, a collection of works based on Johann Sebastian Bach's keyboard inventions. His "Bach-derived framework" was always evident in his Reinventions as he played an "art-metal guitar solo" that included "flamboyant tango rhythms."

Pritsker's 2006 composition, Self Laceration, was positively reviewed in The New York Times, which noted that it "begins with a rhythmically insistent, irresistibly zesty movement in which the focus moves briskly around the ensemble."

Another 2006 citation in The New York Times, by Brian Wise, cited Pritsker's Cauldron of Unsatisfied Hatred as the "highlight of the evening" and referred to the piece as a "pulsating duet". Wise went on to say, "Mr. Pritsker expressed skepticism about whether a deep connection could be drawn between music and pugilism."

During a performance of Terry Riley's In C at Governors Island, The New York Times noted, "Probably no one had more fun than the guitarist Gene Pritsker."

In 2012 he released the chamber opera William James's Varieties of Religious Experience with Composers Concordance Recordings. In a review for NewMusicBox, Frank J. Oteri described its blurring of boundaries as "the only possible reaction to being surrounded by all of these sounds and the musical styles from which they [composers] originate."

== Compositions – selected ==
Samplestra is pre-recorded electronics (as in an orchestra of samples, notated in score format.)

=== Solo ===
- Modified #4 (2012) for clarinet and samplestra or triggered samplestra – composed for Marianne Gythfeld
- Deep Time (2009) for multiple percussion solo – composed for Peter Jarvis
- A 21st Century Reconstruction of J. S. Bach (2005) for bass trombone and samplestra – composed for David Taylor
- 'Sorrow, Like Pleasure, Creates Its Own Atmosphere' for flute and samplestra – composed for Margaret Lancaster
- 'Mysterious Restlessness' for clarinet and samplestra – composed for Michiyo Suzuki
- 'Electrically Tragic' for electric bassoon and samplestra – composed for Martin Kuuskmaan
- 'Never found Again' for solo cello and drone – composed for David Gotay
- 'Ta-Ka-Ki-Ga-Wa' for solo piano – composed for Taka Kigawa
- Scars, Wounds, & Lacerations + Snow to numb the Effect (4 Guitar Pieces) – composed for Greg Baker
- She's so chaconne (violin)
- Picasso's Blues (piano)
- Time Here Becomes Space II (piano)
- What Occurred in the Light, Goes on in the Dark (solo cello)
- Dead Souls (solo guitar)
- Modified #1 (French horn and samplestra) for John Clark
- Modified #2 (electric guitar and samplestra)
- Modified #3 (bassoon and samplestra)
- Kandinsky's Improvisations (piano and samplestra) for Kai Schumacher
- Never Found Again (solo cello and drone) for David Gotay

=== Chamber ===
- 'Variations on Sakura, sakura' for violin and piano – composed for Anne Akiko Meyers
- Recycle (2012) for soprano, baritone, electric guitar, double bass and percussion – composed for Composers Concordance Ensemble
- Herky-Jerky (2012) for chamber ensemble – composed for Composers Concordance Ensemble
- Roundelay (2011) electric guitar and drum set – composed for the Jarvis/Pritsker Duo

=== Chamber orchestra ===
- Songs So Wild and Wayward (2012) for chamber orchestra – composed for the Composers Concordance Chamber Orchestra
- 40 Changing Orbits (2012) for chamber orchestra – composed for the Absolute Ensemble

=== Concertos ===
- Songs so Wild and Wayward (2012) for solo violin and chamber orchestra – composed for Lara St. John
- Incantation (2011) for solo violin and chamber orchestra – composed for Miltiades Papastamou
- 'Reinventions' for piano and chamber orchestra – composed for Simone Dinnerstein
- Flammenschrift A Fanfare for the Natives of this Earth (orchestra)
- Variations on Sakura, Sakura II (orchestra)

=== Orchestra ===
- Cloud Atlas Symphony (2012) for full orchestra – composed for the MDR Symphony Orchestra
- 40 Changing Orbits (chamber orchestra)
- 3 Poems from Flowers of Evil (chorus, chamber orchestra, Di.J.) – composed for the Absolute Ensemble and the Latvian State Choir
- Pretty maidens slam dancing (full orchestra) – composed for the Manhattan Composers Orchestra
- Massacre, 20th century style (full orchestra) – composed for the Absolute Ensemble
- I'm afraid you might ask for my soul (full orchestra)
- Animals (chamber orchestra, narrator)
- PUNK (string orchestra)
- All I want now is to look at life (string orchestra and trumpet)
- Destined (chamber orchestra and samplestra)
- Hologram Spiritual (string orchestra)

=== Operas ===
- William James' Varieties of Religious Experience (2009) – libretto by Gene Pritsker
- Money (2007) – libretto by Gene Pritsker
- Manhattan in Charcoal (chamber opera) – libretto by Jacob Miller
- De Maupassant's Cheaters (chamber opera) – libretto by Gene Pritsker
- The Tell-Tale Heart (chamber opera) – libretto by Gene Pritsker
- The Devil and Superman (chamber opera) – libretto by Gene Pritsker
- Nietzsche the Madman (chamber opera) – libretto by Gene Pritsker

== Discography – selected ==
- Solo-Duo-Trio-Quartet-Quintet: Chamber Electronic Music of Gene Pritsker performed by Sweet Plantain String Quartet (Artist), International Street Cannibals. Composers Concordance Records #comcon003
- Manhattan in Charcoal a chamber opera with libretto/poetry by Jacob Miller – Concordance Records #comcon021
- William James's Varieties of Religious Experience: a chamber opera by Gene Pritsker performed by – Sound Liberation. Concordance Records #comcon07
- 'Samplestra' released on Composers Concordance Records, focusing on electro – acoustic compositions
- 'Melodies Alone Can Proudly Carry Their Own Death' released on Composers Concordance Records, focusing on Chamber music
- 'Eclectic Music eXtravaganza (EMX)' released on Composers Concordance Records, focusing on Chamber music
- '‘Operatic Electric' with Countertenor Juecheng Chenreleased on Composers Concordance Records, focusing on electronic music
- 'Maggots and other Chamber music of Gene Pritsker' released on Composers Concordance Records, focusing on Chamber music
- 'Eroicanization' with ensemble KONTRASTreleased on Composers Concordance Records, Di.J. Concerto
- 'Cloud Atlas Symphony' with Kristjan Jarvi - conductor

MDR Leipzig Radio Symphony, NEscapes Records

- 'Sound Liberation' albums: 'Days' (CCR), 'Open Up Your Ears and Get Some' (Col Legno), 'VRE Suite' (Innova), 'Sound Liberation' (self release), 'Rite Through an Eclectic Spectrum' (CCR), 'Let's Save The World Suite' (CCR)

== Film DVDs – selected ==
- 2012: Cloud Atlas

Pritsker was invited to orchestrate and compose additional music for the screenplay adaption of the novel Cloud Atlas by David Mitchell. The screenplay was written by Lana Wachowski, Tom Tykwer and Lilly Wachowski. This resulted in the Cloud Atlas Symphony.

- 2021: The Matrix Resurrections

Pritsker is the supervising orchestrater and composed additional music for the 2021 Lana Wachwoski film 'The Matrix Resurrections'.

== Bibliography ==
- Pritsker, Gene (2014): Composing Cloud Atlas Symphony. In: Stoppe, Sebastian (ed.), Film in Concert: Film Scores and their Relation to Classical Concert Music, pp. 145–160. ISBN 978-3-86488-060-5. doi:10.25969/mediarep/16802.
- Pritsker, Gene (2014): On Film Music in the 21st Century. In: Stoppe, Sebastian (ed.), Film in Concert: Film Scores and their Relation to Classical Concert Music, pp. 125–130. ISBN 978-3-86488-060-5. doi:10.25969/mediarep/16802.
