= Mark Kostabi =

American artist and composer (born 1960)

Kalev Mark Kostabi
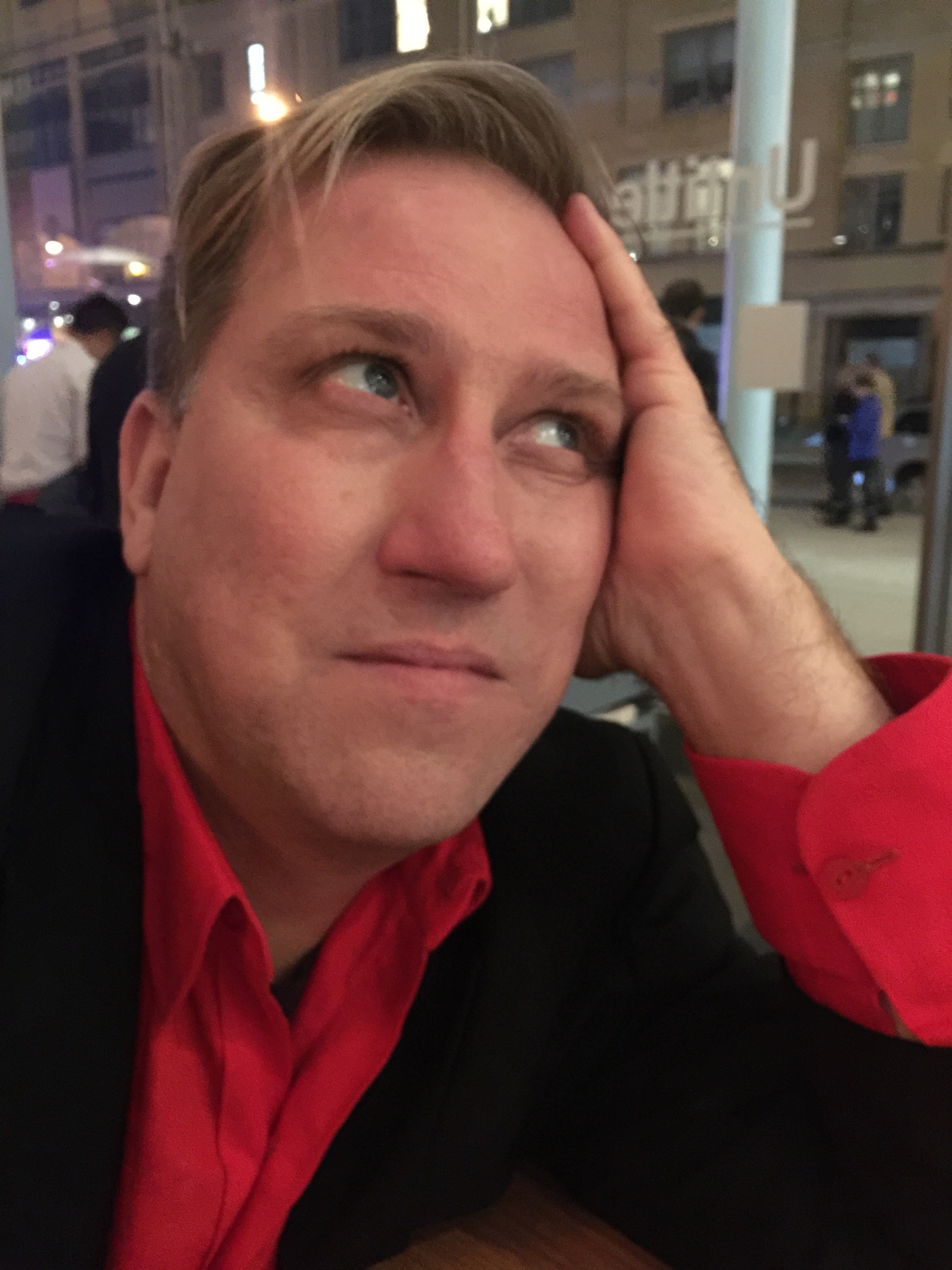
- Kostabi in 2016.
- Born: Kalev Mark Kostabi; November 27, 1960; Los Angeles, California, U.S.
- Education: Studied at California State University, Fullerton
- Known for: Painting, sculptor, composer

Kalev Mark Kostabi (born November 27, 1960) is an American painter, sculptor and composer.

== Early life ==
Kostabi was born in Los Angeles on November 27, 1960, to Estonian immigrants Kaljo and Rita Kostabi. He was raised in Whittier, California and studied drawing and painting at California State University, Fullerton. In 1982 he moved to New York and by 1984 he became a prominent figure of the East Village art scene, winning the "Proliferation Prize" from the East Village Eye for being in more art exhibitions than any other New York artist.

== Artwork ==
Kostabi is most known for his paintings of faceless figures which often comment on contemporary political, social and psychological issues, and which have visual stylistic roots in the work of Giorgio de Chirico and Fernand Léger. Beyond traditional art world exposure, Kostabi has designed album covers for Guns N' Roses (Use Your Illusion) and The Ramones (¡Adios Amigos!), Seether (Holding Onto Strings Better Left to Fray), Jimmy Scott (Holding Back The Years), Glint (Sound in Silence), RK: Roman Klun (Kingsway), Psychotica (Espina) and numerous products including a Swatch watch, Alessi vases, Rosenthal espresso cups, Ritzenhoff milk glasses, and a Giro d'Italia pink jersey.

Kostabi is also known for his many collaborations with other artists including Enzo Cucchi, Arman, Howard Finster, Tadanori Yokoo, Enrico Baj and Paul Kostabi.

Retrospective exhibitions of Kostabi's paintings have been held at the Mitsukoshi Museum in Tokyo (1992) and the Art Museum of Estonia in Tallinn (1998). Kostabi's work is in the permanent collections of the Museum of Modern Art, the Metropolitan Museum of Art, the Guggenheim Museum, the Brooklyn Museum, the National Gallery in Washington D.C., the Museum of Contemporary Art, Los Angeles the Corcoran Gallery of Art, the Yale University Art Gallery the National Gallery of Modern Art in Rome and the Groninger Museum in the Netherlands.

His work was published on the cover of the book East Village '85 published by Pelham Press and his paintings were included prominently in numerous East Village shows in museums and galleries internationally. Matteo Editore published a book on Kostabi titled Mark Kostabi and the East Village scene 1983–1987 written by Baird Jones. During the mid-1980s he developed a media persona by publishing self-interviews which commented on the commodification of contemporary art, which led to theories on Kostabi's cultural relevance in various sociology books including "Life: The Movie: How Entertainment Conquered Reality" by Neal Gabler and "Culture or Trash?: A Provocative View of Contemporary Painting, Sculpture, and Other Costly Commodities" by James Gardner.

In 1986, Kostabi designed the Bloomingdales shopping bag. By 1987 his works were widely exhibited in New York galleries and throughout the United States, in Japan, Germany and Australia.

In 1988, inspiring extensive international press coverage, he founded Kostabi World, his large New York studio known for openly employing numerous painting assistants and idea people. In 1996 he began dividing his time between New York and Rome and consequently his work's already strong presence in the Italian art scene became much more prominent. The influential Italian critic and curator Achille Bonito Oliva included Kostabi in several major exhibitions including at the Galleria Nazionale d'Arte di Roma. The critic, curator and TV personality Vittorio Sgarbi curated a 150 painting Kostabi show at the Chiostro del Bramante in Rome in 2006.

His permanent public works include a mural in Palazzo dei Priori in Arezzo, Italy, a large bronze sculpture in the central square of San Benedetto del Tronto, Italy, a bronze portrait of Pope John Paul II in Velletri, Italy and a large bronze sculpture, "Eternal Embrace," in Largo Villa Glori in Terni, Italy.

In Kostabi's works there is an extensive range of citation and self-citation, which are typically postmodern techniques.

== Music ==
Kostabi has performed his musical compositions as a soloist and with other musicians including Ornette Coleman, Jerry Marotta, Tony Levin, Stefano di Battista, Gene Pritsker, Mark Egan, Lukas Ligeti, Dave Taylor (trombonist), Chris Parker, Tommy Campbell, Lara St. John, John Clark, Adam Holzman, Aaron Comess, John Lee and Paul Kostabi. His compositions have also been performed independently by Kathleen Supové, Rein Rannap, Kristjan Järvi, Mark Berman, Michael Wolff (musician), Marko Martin, Peter Jarvis, Kai Schumacher and the Estonian National Symphony Orchestra.

His debut album, I Did It Steinway, was released on Artists Only Records in October 1998. Produced by Dale Ashley and Charles Coleman, the album features original compositions by Kostabi, and was recorded at Merkin Concert Hall in New York City.

Kostabi's other releases include: Songs For Sumera, New Alliance, The Spectre Of Modernism, Kostabeat, Grace Notes "Closer To First" and "In Between and Beyond."

== Media/cable/TV/film ==
Kostabi has been profiled on 60 Minutes, Eye to Eye with Connie Chung, A Current Affair, Nightwatch (with Charlie Rose), The Oprah Winfrey Show, Lifestyles of the Rich and Famous, Nonsolomoda, West 57th, CNN, MTV and numerous television programs throughout Europe and Japan. In print he has been featured in various publications such as The New York Times, People, Vogue, Architectural Digest, The Face, The Sunday Telegraph and Tema Celeste.

In 1989, Kostabi was mentioned in the TV series Miami Vice, in Season 5, episode 14: "The Lost Madonna".

In 1991, Kostabi was also mentioned in the controversial novel American Psycho, by Bret Easton Ellis.

From the year 2000 to 2010 Kostabi wrote an advice column for artists, "Ask Mark Kostabi", for Artnet Magazine.

Kostabi is the subject of numerous documentary films, most notably Bottom Line: The Kostabi Phenomenon directed by Peter Bach, Con Artist directed by Michael Sladek, and Jedermann directed by Paul Tschinkel. Kostabi has a prominent role in the Emmy award-winning documentary The Art of Failure: Chuck Connelly Not for Sale directed by Jeff Stimmel. "Full Circle: The Kostabi Story", directed by Sabrina Digregorio.

Kostabi produces a cable TV show, The Kostabi Show, where noted art critics and celebrities compete to title his paintings for cash awards. The Kostabi Show was previously known as both Name That Painting and Title This. Kostabi received significant backlash for his remarks about gay men during the AIDS crisis. In a 1989 issue of Vanity Fair, Kostabi said, "These museum curators, that are for the most part homosexual, have controlled the art world in the '80s. Now they're all dying of AIDS, and although I think it's sad, I know it's for the better. Because homosexual men are not actively participating in the perpetuation of human life." While Kostabi apologized in Newsday, saying, "I feel terrible for saying something that was an unfair generalization based on a few specific experiences with gay curators and critics that left me very angry," he retracted the apology ten days later, stating that he was pressured to apologize by Abbeville Press, the publisher of the then upcoming Kostabi: The Early Years. Kostabi told the Post's Page Six, "They made me write all these phony apologies." He reaffirmed his previously stated opinions on gay men, arguing again that gay men dominate the art world and "that's why there's so much bad art in the world."The author, Anthony Haden-Guest, of the original Vanity Fair article, which included the controversial quote, later wrote in Whitehot Magazine: "Another such jaunty provocation got Kostabi accused of being anti-gay. This though was untrue... I know Kostabi and he ain’t no homophobe, indeed believes, like most reasonable folk, that what consenting adults do with their bodies is their own business."

== Literature ==
- Mark Kostabi (self published), "Kostabi", 1980.
- Kostabi, Mark (1985). Upheaval. Pelham Press., First edition 2,000 copies.
- Kostabi, Mark (1986). Office suite. New York: Strother/Elwood Arts. ISBN 9780940515000., First edition 2,000 copies.
- Kostabi, Mark (1988). Sadness because the video rental store was closed & other stories. New York: Abbeville Press. ISBN 9780896598003.
- Chattington, Basil; Mark Kostabi (1990). Kalev Mark Kostabi: the early years. New York: Vanity Press. ISBN 9780962836602.
- Kostabi, Mark (1992). Kostabi: one hundred +. Los Angeles, Calif., USA: Martin Lawrence Limited Editions. ISBN 9780929460116.
- Kostabi, Mark (1996). Conversations with Kostabi (1st ed.). Boston: Journey Editions. ISBN 188520325X.
- Kostabi, Mark; Sam Hunter (1998). Kostabi, the poetry of silence. Philadelphia, Pa.: Jenkintown Press. ISBN 9780929460123.

Others include: The Rhythm of Inspiration, Mark Kostabi and the East Village Scene 1983–1987 and Mark Kostabi in the 21st Century.
