= Tracy Thornton =

American steelpan musician

- Genres: World, Rock, Reggae, Heavy Metal, Punk, Calypso
- Occupations: Musician, Recording Artist, Clinician, Songwriter/Arranger, Producer, Teacher
- Instruments: Steel Drum, Drums, Percussion
- Years active: 1989 — present
- Label: Steel Pandemic Records
- Website: Official site

Tracy Thornton is a steelpan player from the U.S.A.

== Career ==
Tracy Thornton is the Steel Pandemic Records founder and CEO, alongside being creator of “Pan Rocks” has been performing as a professional steelpannist for more than 20 years. Thornton is also a full-time composer, arranger and producer. As a national and international guest artist/clinician for many universities, colleges, public schools and community steel bands, Thornton brings with him his steel pan style, his wealth of knowledge as a musician, and his insights and experiences on the realities of the music business. With 15 solo CDs under his belt, many of Thornton's compositions have become popular to play for steel bands throughout the U.S. and around the world.

Thornton has performed across the continental U.S., as well as Hawaii, Europe, Japan, Hong Kong, China, Mexico, Canada and throughout the Caribbean. He has also performed in several annual Carnival celebrations in Trinidad and Tobago, including Panorama — the world's largest steel band competition, and with Phase II, Potential Symphony, NGC Couva Joylanders, Lavantille's Uni Stars and Tobago's Hope Pan Groove. Tracy also works with New Philadelphia City Schools in Ohio, for concerts with the students. ¬

Thornton has been featured in DRUM! Magazine, Spin magazine, Modern Drummer, Global Rhythm, Billboard Online and MTV.com. His internationally acclaimed “Pan For Punks, A Steelpan Tribute to The Ramones” CD was voted as one of the top 10 CDs of 2006 by Global Rhythm magazine.

Thornton's music has also been featured in television shows including CBS’ drama “NCIS LA”, Comedy Central's hit “Workaholics”, “Keeping Up With The Kardashians” and a Trini Tunes cartoon short “De Wild Meat Famalee”.

Thornton is also well known as the founder and director of the youth steel band “Sons of Steel.” Sons of Steel toured with the original Wailer's Band and performed at Walt Disney World's Epcot Center, as well as with Trinidad and Tobago's soca king Machel Montano, Iwer George and Shadow, to name a few. Sons of Steel also performed on Univision's Variety show “Sabado Gigante,” which has more than 100 million viewers worldwide.

Tracy is also the founder of “Pan Rocks!”. He has recorded and released “Pan Rocks”, “Pan Rocks II…Pan Bangerz Ball” and “Pan Rocks lll…Ska Punk’d” where they cover many popular songs in steel drum. He also puts on “Pan Rocks” concerts that combine steel bands and musicians nationally and internationally to form 30 to over 100 piece steel orchestras strictly to perform and rock out the music from his trilogy of “Pan Rocks” CDs.

“Pan Rocks” was tapped to do a showcase concert at PASIC 2015 in San Antonio, TX with over 80 players strong. Tracy was part of the faculty at KoSA Drum Camp 2015 and performed Pan Rocks style with John Blackwell of Prince/Justin Timberlake. Tracy's was also featured at South Carolina's PAS Day with over 100 steelpannist and famed drummer Greg Bissonette of Ringo Starr's All Star Band and David Lee Roth. Most recently, Tracy has also shared the stage (with a small Pan Rocks group) with Jane's Addiction's stickman Stephen Perkins a few times including the world-famous "Whisky A Go Go in Hollywood!"

One of Tracy's most recent ventures is “Pan Rocks Project LA” where Tracy gathered pan players from all over the US and Canada to meet in Hollywood to record a promotional/documentary of Pan Rocks that was shot in cutting edge 360 video. The project was produced by Matt Starr (Ace Frehley/Mr. Big) and included drummer Stephen Perkins (Jane's Addiction), bassist Billy Sheehan (Mr. Big/David Lee Roth), guitarist Tracii Guns (LA Guns), guitarist Bruce Kulick (Kiss/Grand Funk Railroad), and cellists Emil & Dariel from America's Got Talent fame. The project was mixed by Smiley Sean (Tommy Lee) and mastered award-winning engineer Dave Collins (Metallica, The Police, Jane's Addiction).

Tracy co-founded the "Ensoul Pan Pickup," which is a pickup for a pan, and lets you plug into an amp.

== Discography ==
=== Albums ===
- Tracy Thornton's Steeling Christmas, 1994
- Been Caught Steelin, 1996
- Steel & Brass, 1998
- Outta The Blue 1999
- Carpe Diem, 2000
- Just Me and My Pan, 2002
- Steel Drum Fever, 2006
- Pan For Punks...A Steelpan Tribute To The Ramones, 2006
- Pan Can Jam! 2007
- Been Caught Steelin'...A Steelpan Tribute To Jane's Addiction, 2008
- Under The Caribbean Sun, 2010
- Pan On The North Shore...A Steelpan Tribute To Jack Johnson, 2011
- The Pan Police...A Steelpan Tribute To The Police, 2012
- Baked In The Sun...The 420 Pan Sessions, 2013
- Pan Rocks, 2013
- Pan Rocks...Pan Bangerz Ball, 2015
- Pan Rocks...Ska Punked!, 2017
- Pan Rocks...Project LA 2017
- Pan Rocks Rush, 2018
