= Timothy Garon =

American musician

Timothy Dean Garon (September 13, 1951 – May 1, 2008) was an American singer/songwriter who was denied a liver transplant by the University of Washington Medical Center due to his legal use of cannabis.

Garon contracted the hepatitis C virus (HCV) and received medical cannabis under the supervision of a physician in compliance with Initiative 692 of the State of Washington's Medical Use of Marijuana Act of 1998. The law makes it legal for patients to use, possess and cultivate cannabis with a medical certificate according to state law, but not according to U.S. federal law. Garon's physician "authorized Garon to smoke pot to alleviate nausea and abdominal pain and to stimulate his appetite."

The issue raises ethical concerns regarding future transplants. The American Civil Liberties Union and the Marijuana Policy Project posted blogs on the internet addressing Garon's story.

== Music ==
Tim Garon recorded two albums: "Drunk in the Arms of Love" with Nashville producer/guitarist Cam King, and "Silence of Her Heart" with T-Bone Wolk of SNL fame and who played with Hall & Oates.
