= Kai Schumacher =

German pianist

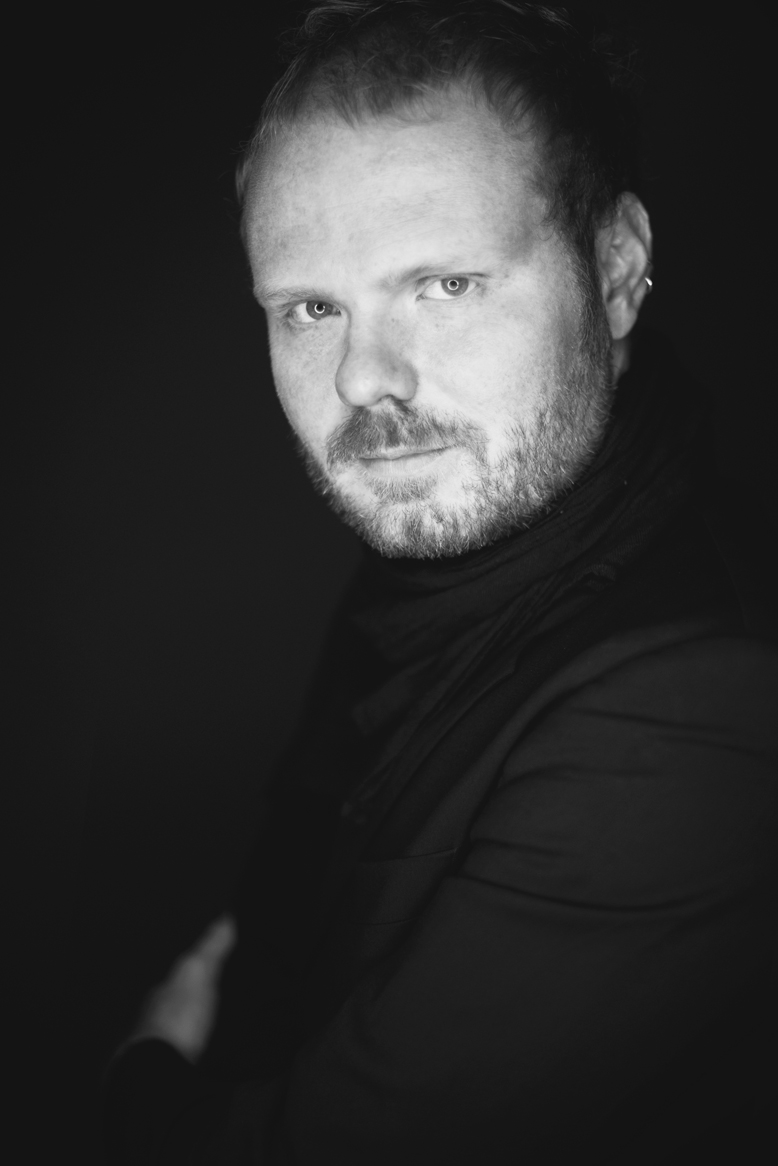

Kai Schumacher (born 18 November 1979) is a German pianist. He specializes primarily in American piano music of the 20th and 21st century, as well as music for piano and electronics

== Life ==
Kai Schumacher received his first piano lessons when he was five years old. In 1995 he made his debut at the age of 15 years as a soloist with the Baden-Baden Philharmonic performing the Second Piano Concerto by Dmitri Shostakovich. After graduating from the Gymnasium Hohenbaden Baden-Baden he began studying at the Folkwang University of the Arts in Essen in the piano class of Prof. Till Engel. Following his final concert examination, he graduated "with distinction" in 2009.

His first recording, a performance of The People United Will Never Be Defeated!, a large-scale set of variations by the American composer Frederic Rzewski on a Chilean revolutionary song, was made the same year and released by Wergo. The album received good reviews both nationally and internationally and was awarded the "Star of the Month" (Stern des Monats) by Fono Forum magazine. Kai Schumacher later reprised his performance as part of a live 'art action' organized by Friedrich von Borries in Berlin and at the Bayerische Akademie der Schönen Künste in München (Bavarian Academy of Fine Arts). In 2013, he released his second album "Transcriptions" featuring his original arrangements of grunge, heavy metal, and indie rock songs for solo piano. He has performed this program widely, in both classical concert halls as well as at pop and rock music festivals such as the Traumzeit-Festival. In June 2015, Kai Schumacher released "Insomnia" on the SWRmusic/hänssler CLASSIC label, featuring a program of works by George Gershwin, John Cage, George Crumb, Brian Belet and Bruce Stark.

From 2010-2014 Kai Schumacher was the keyboardist for folk-pop band Mobilee.

== Discography ==
- Frederic Rzewski: The People United Will Never Be Defeated! (2009) (Wergo)
- Transcriptions (2013) (Intuition)
- Insomnia (2015) (SWRmusic/HänsslerClassic)
- Walking on a twine (mit Mobilée) (2012) (Island Records / Universal)
