= Sheldon Garon =

American East Asian scholar and historian

- Born: Minnesota
- Education: Yale University
- Occupation: Academic
- Known for: historian of modern Japan, household savings

Sheldon Garon is the Nissan Professor in Japanese Studies, professor of history, and professor of East Asian studies at Princeton University. He specialized in modern and contemporary Japanese history with interests also in transnational history and the history of ideas between Asia, Europe, and the United States. His prior research has also focused on the relationship between the state and society.

He has been described as "the world's leading historian on household saving." He is the recipient of a number of prestigious of awards for academics, including the National Endowment for the Humanities Fellowship, the Harry Frank Guggenheim Foundation grant, and the Abe Fellowship from the government of Japan.

== Background ==
Garon was born and brought up in Minnesota. He graduated from the University of Minnesota, summa cum laude, in 1973. He then received a master's degree in East Asian studies from Harvard in 1975, followed by a doctorate in history from Yale in 1981. At Yale, he was the recipient of the Sumitomo Prize Fellowship.

== Career ==
In 1980, Garon became an assistant professor of history at Pomona College. He then joined the department of history at Princeton University in 1994.

His first book, The State and Labor in Modern Japan, traced the history of the Japanese labor movement. In 1997, he published Molding Japanese Minds: The State in Everyday Life, an account of the Japanese state’s success at mobilizing its people to act in the perceived interest of the nation in.

In Beyond Our Means: Why America Spends and the World Saves (2011), he argues that the current savings imbalances between the United States and other developed nations are not the result merely of different individual choices. Beyond Our Means tells for the first time how other nations aggressively encouraged their citizens to save by means of special savings institutions and savings campaigns. The U.S. government, meanwhile, promoted mass consumption and reliance on credit through policies such as tax breaks on borrowing, which culminated in the global credit crunch.

== Books ==
- The State and Labor in Modern Japan (1987) University of California Press, Berkeley. ISBN 9780520059832
- Molding Japanese Minds: The State in Everyday Life (1997) Princeton University Press. ISBN 978-0-691-04488-0
- Beyond Our Means: Why America Spends and the World Saves (2011) Princeton University Press. ISBN 978-0-691-13599-1

== Articles ==
- Garon, Sheldon (November 25, 2011). "Why We Spend, Why They Save". The New York Times. p. A25.
- “Transnational History and Japan’s ‘Comparative Advantage,’” Journal of Japanese Studies 43, no. 1 (Winter 2017): 65-92.
- "Rethinking Modernization and Modernity in Japanese History: A Focus on State-Society Relations." The Journal of Asian Studies 53, no. 2 (1994): 346-66. doi:10.2307/2059838.
