= Nick Fowler =

American musician (born 1967)

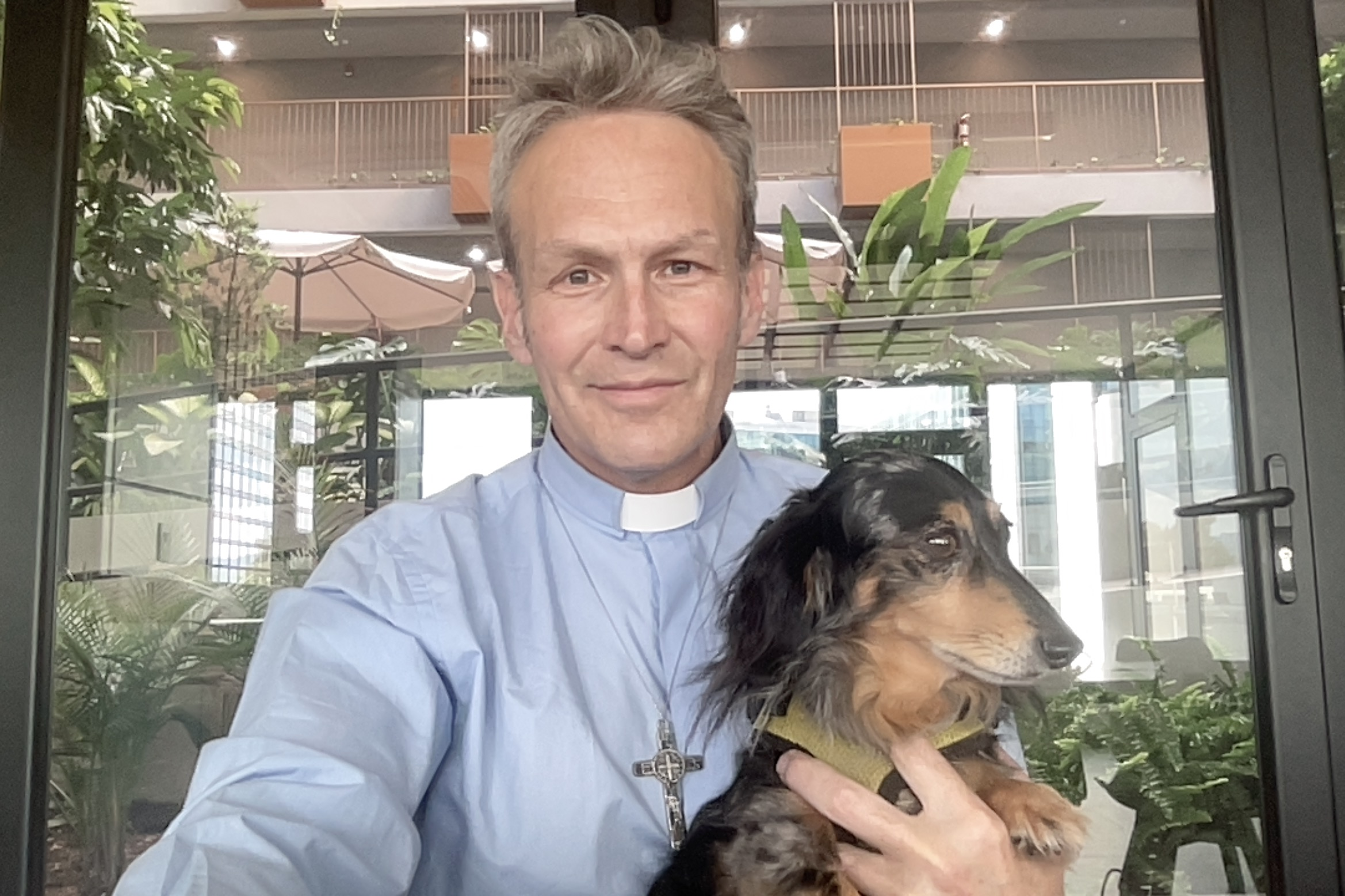
- Born: Nicholas Russel Fowler; May 11, 1967 (age 59)
- Education: Cornell University (BA)
- Occupations: Author; singer; songwriter
- Years active: 1992–present

Nick Russel Fowler (born May 11, 1967) is an American author and musician who began making music while studying at Cornell University. In 1989, he moved to New York City and teamed up with Gregg Wattenberg, Michael Haar, and Greg Smith to form Tonto Tonto. Fowler has published two novels. His first was released in 2002 entitled A Thing (or Two) About Curtis and Camilla and was published by Pantheon Books in the U.S. and by Hodder & Stoughton in the U.K. This novel was followed by My Virtuous Sister. He has also published an essay collection entitled Master of DiviniTy: Collected Essays.

== Early life ==
Fowler grew up in Tallahassee. He attended Maclay School before attending Cornell University, where he studied English literature, creative writing and music theory.

After graduating with a Bachelor of Arts degree in English literature, he moved to New York City.

== Music career ==
Fowler formed the four-piece band Tonto Tonto with Gregg Wattenberg, drummer Michael Haar, and bassist Greg Smith. The band secured a recording contract with Victory, who at the time was a division of Polygram. The band released their debut album Mirror for the Blame produced by Ric Wake, which led Fowler and his three bandmates to appear in an episode of The Tonight Show.

In 2009, Fowler formed the pomp-rock band Maximilian is King with Arthur Lynn and keyboardist Rob Clores. The band released an extended play album, Music For The Fire, which was mixed by Steve Thompson and placed on rotation on Anything Anything with Rich Russo, featured on New York City's largest rock radio station, WRXP 101.9. Maximilian Is King's debut full-length Songs To Kill Yourself With was released shortly after. The album was notably mixed by Roy Thomas Baker, produced by Arthur Lynn with drum programming by Carlos Alomar. On September 15, 2011, Maximilian is King performed at The Low Down With Hoyle Jackson at Bloomingdale's 59th Street in Manhattan. In November 2011, Fowler began performing live with guitarist and songwriter Steve Stevens. In April 2013, Fowler performed the song "Sleep Walking" included in the motion picture The Right Kind of Wrong. On May 27, 2020, Fowler released two songs he recorded with the band Velvet Revolver entitled "Long Way Down to Gehenna" and "This Is Not America."

Fowler is a founding member of the non-profit Musicians on Call.

== Author ==
In 2002, Fowler's first novel, titled, A Thing (or Two) About Curtis and Camilla was published in North America by Pantheon Books, and by Hodder & Stoughton in the UK. He contributed illustrations to the novel. Fowler's second novel, entitled My Virtuous Sister, was published in 2019. Fowler's book of essays, entitled Master of DiviniTy: Collected Essays, was published in December 2022.

His story, "Innocence," was published in The Encyclopedia of Exes, edited by Meredith Broussard. Fowler has also written fiction for Vice-Versa online journal and Pulse Berlin. Fowler's journalism has been published in GQ and POZ. He has taught fiction writing at mediabistro, The New School and NYU in the Holocaust Museum. During this time, his short story, "A Spider's Diary" was published in the NYU literary magazine, Epiphany. His academic criticism has been published in The Antioch Review and his poetry in The Tribecca Poetry Review.

== Actor ==
In 1999, Fowler appeared on The Sopranos in the 10th episode of the first season, "A Hit Is a Hit". Fowler played the part of Richie Santini, an ex-boyfriend of Adriana La Cerva. In the episode, he performed in the fictional band Visiting Day, created by Fowler and Gregg Wattenberg.

== Bibliography ==
- A Thing (or Two) About Curtis and Camilla
- Fowler, Nick (2019). My Virtuous Sister. New York: Upper Hand Press. ISBN 978-0998490687.
- Master of DiviniTy: Collected Essays published on Amazon.
- "Innocence" (short story)– Published in The Encyclopedia of Exes.
- "A Spider's Diary" (short story) – Published in Epiphany.
- Chase Reprise (short story) published in Pulse Berlin
- Ember Days (short story) published in Vice Versa
- Bruce Jay Friedman:Making Sense of Entropy-published in The Antioch Review
- Getting Laid in Tinseltown-GQ
- Timothy Older, By Design-Tribeca Poetry Review

== Discography ==
- Tonto Tonto - Mirror for the Blame (1992) released by Victory Records
- Maximilian is King-Songs to Kill Yourself With (2011)
- Real Today – featured in the motion picture and video game Dr. Giggles
- Heroine Girl – featured in the motion picture Undocumented
- You Don't Remember – featured in the 90210 episode Winter Wonderland
- Goodbye – featured in the motion picture Mercy
- Sleep Walking-featured in the motion picture The Right Kind of Wrong
- Hold On Me –DJ Riddler Enigma
- Long Way Down to Gehenna –Nick Fowler The Messiah and Velvet Revolver (2020)
- This Is Not America –Nick Fowler The Messiah and Velvet Revolver (2020)

== Recognition ==
Fowler appeared in CODE NYC's first issue.
