= Jesse Garon (musician) =

Jessé Garon'
- Birth name: Bruno Julien André Fumard dit Jessé Garon’ Desaint-Henry
- Born: 1 August 1962 (age 63); La Rochelle, France
- Genres: Rock'n'roll, Country, Blues,
- Occupation(s): Singer, composer; author-songwriter / painter
- Years active: 1983–present
- Labels: Polydor, Sony Music
- Website: www.bruno-jessegaron-fumard.com

Jessé Garon (born 1 August 1962 in La Rochelle, France) is a French artist, composer, singer-songwriter, and multi-instrumentalist of blues, country, rock'n'roll.

== Career ==
He became known in 1983 with songs including "C'est Lundi" (1st prize Interpress of French Song, 1984), "Lucky Dom Dom", "Nous Deux "("With You" in English; clip n° 1 in New York and Tokyo in summer 1985), "Le Prince du Rock'n'roll" (1986), "Elle n'a pas dit Oui" (1993), "Je Suis un Bohème" (2004) and others.

He is a student of the Bible of the High Medieval [EPHE-Sorbonne, 1993–2003] and has a degree in medicinal science, with a specialization in naturopathy [AMCC of Montreal, in February 2002 to 20 March 2006]. From 2003 to 2004 he was scientific director for Publishing Harnois.

== Discography ==
- Jesse Garon et l'âge d'or (Polydor 1984)
- Hommage (Polydor 1985)
- Prince du Rock 'n' Roll (Polydor 1986)
- Être Jeune (Polydor 1988)
- Complèt'ment Chiffré (A/B 1993)
- Best Of Jessé Garon' (Choice Of Music 2002)
- Je Crois En La Vie (Sony Music – FGL 2004)
- D'un Commun Accord (Sony Music 2006)
- Le Coffret : Jessé Garon’ – L'essentiel du Prince du Rock 'n' Roll (FGL 2010)
- Jessé Garon’ Live : Rock’n’roll aux Issambres (Naïve 2012)

== DVD ==
- Jessé Garon’ Hillbilly French Cat (FCLP – 2005)
- Big Beat Story Volume 2 (BBR – 2011 – participatif)

== Filmography ==
- A nous les garçons (Michel Lang – 1985)
- La nuit du clown (François Chayé – 1994)

== Some french articles in Historical Sciences ==
- Introduction to Medieval Bible (Harnois éd. 03.2001, p. 50–51)
- The Bible of Alcuin (Harnois éd. 05.2001, p. 50–53)
- Medieval Paleography (Harnois éd. 07.2001, p. 6–9)
- The Ancient Monarchies (Harnois éd. 11.2002, p. 22–31)
- Introduction to the life of Prophet Mohamed (Harnois éd. 10.2003, p. 28.31)
- The Veterans poliorcetics Hebrews (Harnois éd. 12.2003, p. 58–61)
- The Book of the Dead Ancient Egyptians (Harnois éd. 12.2003, p. 62–71)
- The Tibetan Book of the Dead (Harnois éd. 02.2004, p.18-21)
- The Bible of Saint Thomas Aquinas (Harnois éd. 03.2004, p. 64–70)
