= Salomé Breziner =

American film director

Salomé Breziner or Salome Breziner is a film director, screenwriter, and script supervisor, known for directing Helicopter Mom starring Nia Vardalos in 2014, and The Secret Lives of Dorks.

== Personal life ==
Born in Belgium and raised in Miami Beach, Florida, by Holocaust survivor parents, Salomé is a multi-lingual director and writer and producer of award-winning shorts, music videos, and feature films - both narrative and documentary. Based in Los Angeles and Edinburgh, she is in development with Screen Scotland, on her first Created By TV series, LANDED. LANDED is an ecological thriller and drama set in Scotland and LA that she will direct from a screenplay she wrote based on the novel LANDED by Louise Ramsay. She developed the series with Steven J Wolfe (500 Days Of Summer) and Kim DeVenne (101 Productions) to cement her message of rewilding and stopping damaging ecological practices, and bring it to the screen with magical realism elements to begin her foray into international streaming content.

== Influence ==
With a keen eye for quirky talent and dark comedy Salomé has directed 6 feature films, produced 9 feature films and various commercial and Music Video projects for clients like: Corona Light (for their Rutbuster Campaign), Goodby, Silverstein & Partners, GDefy, Matthew McConaughey And Butch Walker, Black Widows, Lisa Loeb, Foxy Shazam, and many more. Acting as a producer and creator through her company REALM, she produced and wrote SYNTHESIZERS, which was nominated for best music video award VH1 and has earned several million internet views. Salomé's films have screened at 30+ festivals around the world and won numerous awards, beginning with her first feature film TOLLBOOTH that premiered in Cannes to great reviews. “Cut from the same cloth as David Lynch’s Twin Peaks with a dash of Wim Wenders... and Samuel Beckett” Variety, A Best Documentary win in 2013 at the Nashville Film Festival for producing her documentary BUTCH WALKER: OUT OT FOCUS and going on to direct Helicopter Mom starring Nia Vardalos in 2014.

== Filmography ==
Director

Year	Title	Director	Writer
2014	Helicopter Mom	Yes	No
2013	The Secret Lives of Dorks	Yes	No
2001	Fast Sofa	Yes	Yes
1996	An Occasional Hell	Yes	No
1994	Tollbooth	Yes	Yes
1992	Lift	Yes	Yes

Script supervisor

- Paint it Black (1989)
- Midnight Crossing (1988)
- The Unholy (1988)

Acting roles

- Look (2007)

Producer

- Feeling Randy (2022)
- Butch Walker: Out of Focus (2013)
- The Ganzfeld Haunting (2012)
- King Of Beasts (2018)

== Accolades ==
Her films have garnered awards and special attention at Cannes, Oldenburg International Film Festival, Palm Springs International Film Festival, Seattle Film Festival, Dallas International Film Festival, Cork International Film Festival, CIFF to name a few. Salomé's film Helicopter Mom opened OUTFEST with a special Ford Amphitheater Premiere in 2014. She is a visual storyteller who elicits powerful performances from actors such as Stephen Lang, Fairuza Balk, Matthew McConaughey, Tom Berenger, Crispin Glover, Riley Voelkel, Jennifer Tilly, Jim Belushi, Eric Roberts, Valeria Golino, Natasha Lyonne, to name just a few. Salomé frequently blurs the lines between comedy and drama. Salome is currently a show runner on various television shows 2021–2022. Salome Breziner recently helped produce the 2023 comedy Feeling Randy, starring Reid Miller, Marguerite Moreau, and Johnathan Silverman.
