= Vadim Kapustin =

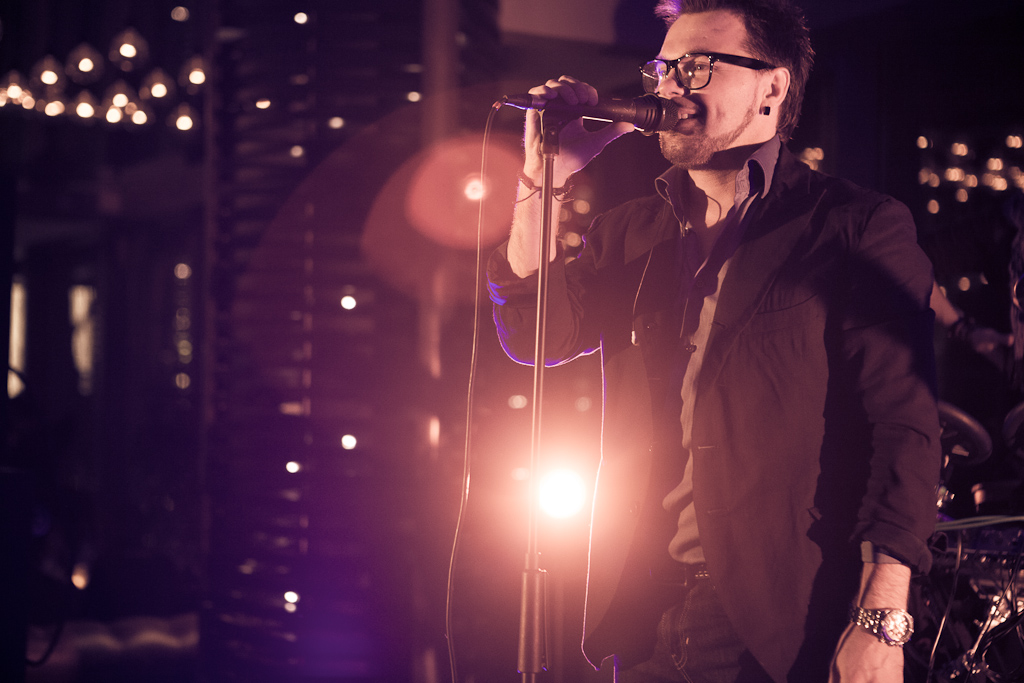

Background information
- Born: 19 September 1972 (age 53)
- Genres: Electronic, Slowdance, Easy listening
- Labels: TSM
- Website: http://www.trianglesun.com

Vadim Kapustin (born 19 September 1972, Barnaul) is a Russian singer, songwriter who sings in English.

== Biography ==
Born in Barnaul. Graduated from Barnaul musical school with major in Academic choir conductor, but due to high interest in singing and composing, he parted from conducting. In 1995 Vadim leaves for Berlin where he was working as a composer in Russian chamber theater "Nostalgia". He wrote music for plays, his most famous works are - a "Crime without punishment", "Labyrinth of the Russian soul". Several ballet stars were working on productions, including Bolshoi Theater's soloist Michael Shannon (USA)

In Berlin Vadim starts to perform as jazz and soul singer. He works a lot with different musicians at famous Berlin's clubs, such as "Kwazimodo" and "Shlot".

In 2000 Vadim returned to Moscow, where he continues to be engaged in music and working in studios.

== Triangle Sun ==
In 2003 in Moscow, Vadim meets Aleksandr Knyazev (composer and sound producer).

Vadim, after listening to some of Aleksandr's tracks, decides to write vocals and lyrics, after that Aleksandr's electronic tracks become songs. Musicians decide to work together and creating a project, now known as Triangle Sun.

In 2004 the band wins in Russian festival Cafe Del Mar Lounge. After that Triangle Sun went to the Spanish coast of Ibiza where they played their music in world's famous Cafe Del Mar (Ibiza). Russian performers were noticed by Cafe Del Mar Music label's owners by whom the composition “Beautiful” was included in their 13th compilation. Popularity of the band is growing and in 2005 Triangle Sun performs at Parliament Lounge festival as headliners.

Triangle Sun was the first Russian band included in series of Cafe del Mar compilations, and later, became the first Russian band who played at Global Gathering 2007 festival in London.

Triangle Sun's debut album titled "Diamond" was released in September 2007, on Diamond records.

One of the band's notable achievements of 2010 was when the world's largest chocolate manufacturer Mars licensed unreleased track - "Moments", as a soundtrack for Dove's advertising campaign on the US market.

In the same year managers of the German Sony music division included their composition "Diamond" into 9th compilation of Erotic lounge which at various times included music bands such as Air, Tosca, Thievery corporation, Kruder & Dorfmeister, Jazzanova, Yanderboi, Blank&Jones, Groove Armada and many other world known masters of downtempo. Compilation was released in October 2010.

Beginning of 2011 was a successful one for the band. One of the major French label's Wagram included song "When going forward" ("Когда идешь вперед") in Buddha Bar's 13th compilation.

In 2013 Triangle Sun received the Golden Gargoyle (Золотая Горгулья) Club Award in the category "Best electronic project of the year".

In 2015 the band was invited to perform at "Formula - 1" Grand Prix of Russia in Sochi during entertaining part of racing.

== Discography ==
Triangle Sun's music has been included in the world's famous compilations, their songs can be heard on several radio stations worldwide, the music videos can be seen on MTV, and other music channels worldwide. Triangle Sun has released 3 albums: "Diamond" ,"the Iris", "Born in the silence" and is working on their 4th album.

== Studio albums ==
Year of release	Title	Label	Country
2007	Diamond	Diamond records	Russia
2010	Iris	World club music/ TME	Russia
2011	Diamond / Iris	Tyranno	Germany
2014	Born in the Silence	TSM	Russia

== Other projects ==
Vadim is also actively working outside of Triangle Sun. He's cooperating with famous DJs and sound producers Steve Brian, Bitoko, Saterna, Valiko and others. Remix on his song "I believe in life" written with co-author Saterna was played by Armin Van Buuren in his program A State of Trance. The song was dedicated to Vadim's brother, Roman, who died.

== Awards ==
Golden gargoyles, 2013 - "Best electronic project of the year"

== Music videos ==
Triangle Sun shot 2 music videos on singles from both albums. In 2011 both albums entered a global MTV. Both of the videos are also being rotated on VH1 Brazil and VIVA TV Germany and Poland.
