= Campbell McGrath =

American poet (born 1962)

Campbell John McGrath (born January 26, 1962) is an American poet. He is the author of twelve full-length collections of poetry, including Seven Notebooks (Ecco Press, 2008), Shannon: A Poem of the Lewis and Clark Expedition (Ecco Press, 2009), In the Kingdom of the Sea Monkeys (Ecco Press, 2012), and XX: Poems for the Twentieth Century (Ecco Press, 2016), for which McGrath was a finalist for the Pulitzer Prize in Poetry.

== Life ==
McGrath was born in Chicago, Illinois, and grew up in Washington, D.C., where he attended Sidwell Friends School; among his classmates was the poet Elizabeth Alexander. He received his B.A. from the University of Chicago in 1984 and his MFA from Columbia University's creative writing program in 1988, where he was classmates with Rick Moody and Bruce Harris Craven. He currently lives in Miami Beach, Florida, and teaches creative writing at Florida International University, where his students have included Richard Blanco, Susan Briante, Jay Snodgrass and Emma Trelles. He is married to Elizabeth Lichtenstein, whom he met while he was an undergraduate; they have two sons.

== Music ==
In the early 1980s, while a student at the University of Chicago, he was a member of the punk band Men From The Manly Planet.

== Awards ==
McGrath has been recognized by some of the most prestigious American poetry awards, including the Kingsley Tufts Poetry Award (for "Spring Comes to Chicago", his third book of poems), a Pushcart Prize, the Academy of American Poets Prize, a Ploughshares Cohen Award, a Guggenheim Fellowship, a Witter Bynner Fellowship from the Library of Congress, and a MacArthur Foundation "Genius Award." In 2011, he was named a Fellow of United States Artists. In 2017, McGrath was a finalist for the Pulitzer Prize in Poetry, along with Adrienne Rich.

== Works ==
While primarily known as a poet, McGrath has also written a play, "The Autobiography of Edvard Munch" (produced by Concrete Gothic Theater, Chicago, 1983); a libretto for Orlando Garcia's experimental video opera "Transcending Time" (premiered at the New Music Biennalle, Zagreb, Croatia, 2009); collaborated with the video artist John Stuart on the video/poetry piece "14 Views of Miami" (premiered at The Wolfsonian, Miami, 2008); and translated the Aristophanes play The Wasps for the Penn Greek Drama Series.

== Bibliography ==
=== Poetry ===
Collections and chapbooks

- Dust (Ohio Review Press, 1987)
- Capitalism (Wesleyan University Press, 1990)
- American Noise (Ecco Press, 1993)
- Spring Comes to Chicago (Ecco Press, 1996)
- Road Atlas (Ecco Press, 1999)
- Mangrovia (chapbook, Short Line Editions, 2001)
- Florida Poems (Ecco Press, 2002)
- Pax Atomica (Ecco Press, 2004)
- Heart of Anthracite: New & Collected Prose Poems (Stride Press, UK)
- Seven Notebooks (Ecco Press, 2008)
- Shannon: A Poem of the Lewis and Clark Expedition (Ecco Press, 2009)
- The Custodian & Other Poems (chapbook, Floating Wolf Quarterly, 2011)
- In the Kingdom of the Sea Monkeys (Ecco Press, 2012)
- XX: Poems For The Twentieth Century (Ecco Press, 2016)
- Nouns & Verbs: New and Selected Poems (Ecco Press, 2019)
- Fever of Unknown Origin: Poems (Knopf, 2023)

List of poems

Title	Year	First published	Reprinted/collected
Saying no	2014	McGrath, Campbell (April 14, 2014). "Saying no". The New Yorker. 90 (8): 30.	
The Mercy Supermarket	2022	McGrath, Campbell (May 23, 2022). "The Mercy Supermarket". The New Yorker. 98 (13): 34–35.	
