= Fast Sofa =

2001 American road-trip comedy film

- Film poster
- Directed by: Salomé Breziner
- Written by: Salomé Breziner; Peter Chase; Bruce Craven
- Screenplay by: Bruce Craven, Peter Chase, Salome Breziner
- Based on: Fast Sofa by Bruce Craven
- Produced by: Christopher Figg; Steven J. Wolfe
- Starring: Jake Busey; Adam Goldberg; Natasha Lyonne; Crispin Glover; Bijou Phillips; Eric Roberts; Jennifer Tilly
- Cinematography: Dean Lent
- Edited by: Paul Heiman; Anthony Redman
- Music by: William V. Malpede
- Release date: June 14, 2001 (Method Fest)
- Running time: 109 minutes
- Country: United States
- Language: English

Fast Sofa is a 2001 American road-trip comedy film directed by Salomé Breziner and starring Jake Busey, Adam Goldberg, Natasha Lyonne, Crispin Glover, Bijou Phillips, Eric Roberts and Jennifer Tilly. It is based on Bruce Craven's novel of the same name.

== Plot ==
Rick loses his girlfriend to his friend when he spends a night with his favorite porn star. He moves out, picks up a weirdo and goes on a wild road trip to find the porn star again.

== Cast ==
- Jake Busey as Rick Jeffers
- Crispin Glover as Jules Langdon
- Jennifer Tilly as Ginger Quail
- Natasha Lyonne as Tamara Jenson
- Adam Goldberg as Jack Weis
- Bijou Phillips as Tracy
- Eric Roberts as Mr. Robinson
- Glenn Shadix as Apartment Manager
