= The Secret Lives of Dorks =

- Film poster
- Directed by: Salomé Breziner
- Written by: Nicholas Brandt; Johnny Severin
- Produced by: Dominic Ianno; Stephen Israel; Steven J. Wolfe
- Starring: Gaelan Connell; Vanessa Marano; Riley Voelkel; Beau Mirchoff; Jim Belushi
- Cinematography: Mark Mervis
- Edited by: Jacob Chase; David Heinz
- Music by: Jeff Cardoni
- Production companies: Indomitable Entertainment; School Pictures
- Distributed by: Gravitas Ventures
- Release date: September 27, 2013
- Running time: 91 minutes
- Country: United States
- Language: English

The Secret Lives of Dorks is a 2013 American independent comedy film directed by Salomé Breziner and starring Gaelan Connell, Vanessa Marano, Riley Voelkel, Beau Mirchoff and Jim Belushi.

== Plot ==
Samantha, a dork, loves Payton, also a dork, who loves Carrie, a cheerleader, who dates Clark, the football captain. When Clark seeks out Payton for lessons about comic books, Payton sees a chance to be with Carrie, but Carrie wants to set Payton up with Samantha.

== Cast ==
- Gaelan Connell as Payton
- Vanessa Marano as Samantha
- Riley Voelkel as Carrie
- Beau Mirchoff as Clark
- Jim Belushi as Bronko
- Jennifer Tilly as Ms. Stewart
- William Katt as Mr. Thomas Gibson
- Kay Lenz as Mrs. Susie Gibson
- Seymour Cassel as Principal
- Kara Taitz as Bernice

== Reception ==
On review aggregator Rotten Tomatoes, the film holds an approval rating of 11% based on 9 reviews, with an average rating of 3.91/10. On Metacritic, the film has a weighted average score of 32 out of 100, based on 7 critics, indicating "generally unfavorable reviews".

Noel Murray of The Dissolve and S. Jhoanna Robledo of Common Sense Media both awarded the film two stars out of five. Mike D'Angelo of The A.V. Club graded it a C−.

Annlee Ellingson of the Los Angeles Times gave the film a positive review and wrote "...Johnny Severin and Nicholas David Brandt's otherwise clever and original script takes an unexpected turn at nearly every intersection, resulting in a funny and big-hearted coming-of-age romance."
