= Ray Meets Helen =

- Theatrical release poster
- Directed by: Alan Rudolph
- Screenplay by: Alan Rudolph
- Produced by: Ernst Etchie Stroh; Steven J. Wolfe
- Starring: Keith Carradine; Sondra Locke; Keith David; Jennifer Tilly; Lenny Von Dohlen; Samantha Mathis
- Cinematography: Spencer Hutchins
- Edited by: Jason Erickson
- Music by: Shahar Stroh
- Distributed by: Moonstone Entertainment
- Release dates: October 9, 2017 (Haifa International Film Festival); May 4, 2018 (USA)
- Running time: 100 minutes
- Country: United States
- Language: English

Ray Meets Helen is a 2017 romantic drama film directed by Alan Rudolph. It is Sondra Locke's last acting appearance before her death in 2018.

== Plot ==
Ray and Helen each happen upon large sums of money which enable them to reinvent themselves. Helen comes by a drunk woman in a bar in the morning and tries to dissuade her from driving away. Later she sees the car at the side of the road out in a barren location. The woman is sat under a tree and has shot herself leaving a note inviting the person who finds her to take possession of her flat and effectively her old life. Ray is an insurance investigator who is treated badly by work. He vomits and goes to hospital for tests. His blood sample is wrongly labelled and later he gets a call suggesting bad health news.

When Ray is out on his latest job - the turnover of a bank van carrying cash - he sees a boy putting wads of money into a rucksack. Later he tracks the boy to his house. He tells him about his life as boxer before a stray bullet injured his hand. The boy shows him the rest of the money he has under lock and key.

Ray and Helen return to a fancy French restaurant where they ate when 'poor' and were moved on in favour of richer customers. Ray approaches Helen, this time wearing a suit, and offers her champagne. They go out dancing and give money to homeless people, clearly enjoying themselves. But the money they leave behind them seems to cause arguments.

The two kiss and then go to Helen's new apartment. Ray is reluctant when he sees the location because he knows a woman who lives there (Ginger). Inside the apartment Mary's ex-lover appears on the intercom shouting. Helen tries to explain that Mary is dead and how she came to 'have' the apartment. She becomes upset as she feels she cannot be a new person despite trying. Ray kisses her regardless.

Helen asks Ray to wait in the hall while she makes a call. In the corridor, Ray sees his boss, Harve, leave Ginger's apartment - they seem to be breaking up but also talk about Ray. Helen has rung the police (presumably to report Mary's death) but changes her mind. Ray goes back into the apartment and Helen says she wants to go home. Ray suggests she sleep but Helen invites him back for sex. Next morning he gets up before her. They still like each other.

Ray goes to his place and Harve comes round. He's worried that Ginger wants to go public with their relationship and he is nervous. Ray gets a taxi back to the boy's neighbourhood and removes a bike and bag from the trunk. He meets a woman, Rita, he saw before who says she'd like to raise the boy (and she used to be in the army). Ray gives the boy the bike. The boy's parents aren't there and the money is gone. To Ray's surprise the boy says the money is in the bank and gives Ray a few wads. Ray tells the boy to pack his favourite things in his backpack and go next door to Faye and Rita's. Then Ray plays with the boy as he learns to ride his bike.

Ray heads off to his hospital appointment. Four masked guys who may or may not be neighbourhood watch chase Ray, who scatters money as he runs to slow them down. The police then pull over by Ray and the cop says 'stop or I'll shoot'.

At Helen/ Mary's apartment, the ex-lover arrives demanding to see Mary. Helen explains she's gone and throws him out. Ray gives too much cash to a nurse and the doctor arrives to say they must do more tests. Helen reports the car accident so Mary will be found. Ray sits in a cab and watches Helen leave the apartment block in her own clothes. Thinking he is ill and he doesn't want to ruin her life he asks the cab to drive off. Then he asks the cabbie to drive to Kildare County where Helen said she lived. The cabbie makes off with lots of money.

Helen drives herself home and finds a cash note in the drive and a bloody handprint on the door - Ray's. She picks up a hammer but finds the door is still locked, so goes inside. She hasn't seen Ray lying on the grass. Ray wakes up and tries the door. Helen picks up a gun. She fires at him, hitting a cupboard. Ray collapses.

== Cast ==
- Keith Carradine as Ray
  - Cade Carradine as Young Ray
- Sondra Locke as Helen
- Keith David as Harve
- Samantha Mathis as Mary
- Jennifer Tilly as Ginger
- Joshua Caleb Johnson as André
- Kim Wayans as Lizzie Faye
- Cynda Williams as Dr. Harris
- Jack Noseworthy as Loomis
- Lenny von Dohlen as Armond
- Tyson Ritter as Woody
- Susan Misner as Jane
- Neil Jackson as Russ
- Steven J. Wolfe as Mr. Rich

== Production ==
Rudolph wrote the script fifteen years before it was made. It was based on several newspaper articles, one about an armored-truck crash where the truck had gone off the freeway into a poor neighborhood, and another one about a woman who found another woman’s identity and decided to become her. Rudolph said "I didn’t want to make a movie about either of those specifically, but they just kind of tangled with each other, so I wrote the screenplay but left the ages of the main characters unknown." He added, "I wanted to make a film about how souls entwine, how surfaces attract, and yet there’s something underneath that really attracts them, that keeps them together."

Rudolph had a chance to make the film fifteen years after he wrote the script. He decided to cast long time collaborator Keith Carradine in the male lead opposite Lesley Ann Warren as Helen. Warren but she was replaced by the older Sondra Locke, who came out of retirement to do the role. Rudolph said "Locke is known for all those movies she did with Eastwood... and I thought, well, [casting her] is like discovering someone of a certain age.",

It was Alan Rudolph's first feature film in 15 years.

The film uses the track of the Triangle Sun group by composer Alexander Knyazev. The director really liked the sound of the instrumental track "Buddha" conveying the concept and mood of the film.

According to the moderator of Alan Rudolph's fan club, the director knew that Locke was dying but never let on and was complicit in allowing her death to go unreported for a month and a half.

== Release ==
The film premiered at the Haifa International Film Festival on October 9, 2017. It had a limited theatrical release on May 4, 2018 in only three theaters in Manhattan, Beverly Hills, and Bainbridge Island, Washington.

Rudolph said "I love it. I couldn’t be more proud of it... It was the purest experience I could ever have making a film, and that was exactly what I was after."

== Reception ==
On the review aggregator website Rotten Tomatoes, 43% of 7 critics' reviews are positive, with an average rating of 7.5/10. Metacritic, which uses a weighted average, assigned the film a score of 64 out of 100, based on 5 critics, indicating "generally favorable" reviews.

In a mixed review, John DeFore of The Hollywood Reporter wrote that "the movie succumbs to one false note after the other — contrivances both fortunate and un- that increasingly test our willingness to accept what has come before as simply the strange vibes of a filmmaker accustomed to another age."

Jeannette Catsoulis of The New York Times wrote that the film "has a wistful, whimsical sophistication that has all but disappeared from movies. Filled with imaginative visuals populated by the ghosts of the gone and hopes for the future, the movie is wonderfully, magically humane."
