= Bandslam =

2009 film by Todd Graff

- Theatrical release poster
- Directed by: Todd Graff
- Screenplay by: Josh A. Cagan; Todd Graff
- Story by: Josh A. Cagan
- Produced by: Elaine Goldsmith-Thomas
- Starring: Aly Michalka; Vanessa Hudgens; Gaelan Connell; Scott Porter; Lisa Kudrow
- Cinematography: Eric Steelberg
- Edited by: John Gilbert
- Production companies: Walden Media; Goldsmith-Thomas Productions
- Distributed by: Summit Entertainment
- Release dates: August 6, 2009 (Mann Village Theatre); August 14, 2009 (United States)
- Running time: 111 minutes
- Country: United States
- Language: English
- Budget: $20 million
- Box office: $12.2 million

Bandslam is a 2009 American musical romantic comedy drama film directed by Todd Graff, who co-wrote the screenplay with Josh A. Cagan, based on a story by Cagan. The film stars Aly Michalka in her feature film debut, Vanessa Hudgens, Gaelan Connell, Scott Porter, and Lisa Kudrow. The story revolves around Will (Connell) and Charlotte (Michalka), who form an unlikely bond through their shared love of music. Assembling a like-minded crew of misfits, the friends form a rock group and perform in a battle of the bands competition called "Bandslam".

Principal photography took place in Austin, Texas. During filming, the film underwent multiple title changes, including Will and Rock On.

Bandslam premiered at the Mann Village Theatre in Westwood, Los Angeles, on August 6, 2009, and was released in the United States on August 14, by Summit Entertainment. The film received generally positive reviews from critics, with many praising the acting and soundtrack. However, the film was a commercial failure, grossing only $12.2 million worldwide against a $20 million budget. Insiders panned the film's marketing, which many cited as a primary reason for the film's underperformance at the box-office. In a brief cameo appearance, this was David Bowie's final film appearance before his death in 2016.

== Plot ==
Will Burton is a music enthusiast and a David Bowie fan. When Will's mother Karen finds a new job, he switches to a new school, which he is eager to do since he was bullied at his previous one. During lunch one day at his new school, he meets a girl who says her name is written Sa5m (pronounced Sam; the 5 is silent). She tells him about Bandslam, an annual music competition in which the winning band gets a recording contract. Will and Sa5m quickly become friends but, shortly after, he is sought after by an older girl named Charlotte Barnes. Impressed by his eclectic knowledge of music, Charlotte, who is a gifted singer-songwriter, asks Will to manage her rock/ska band.

Will agrees to help Charlotte's band (later called I Can't Go On, I'll Go On) which includes Bug and Omar, eventually expanding it with more like-minded outcasts. The group's sound starts to come together and their prospects for success look bright. Will starts losing his "loser-status", but the band gets in the way of completing a class project he was doing with Sa5m. After spending a day with Sa5m, Charlotte teaches Will how to properly kiss a girl, by demonstrating on him that night. Will takes Sa5m to the overlook and, after an awkward start, successfully kisses her, after which Sa5m shyly asks Will to accompany her to a movie screening, to which he agrees. However, Will stands up Sa5m, instead going to a concert with Charlotte. After that, Sa5m starts ignoring Will at school; so he visits her house, hoping to apologize. Her mom shows him a video of a younger Sa5m performing "Everything I Own", but when Sa5m arrives home she is outraged and orders Will to leave. As an apology, he makes a touching documentary short about her for his Human Studies project and she eventually forgives him.

After Will accidentally ruins Ben's attempt to reconcile with Charlotte, Ben decides to do a little research on him, in order to ruin his image. He finds out about Will's father, who was sent to prison years ago when he accidentally killed a child while driving drunk. Ben then starts to call Will "Dewey" (just as other students did at his old school), which stands for "DWI" ("Driving While Intoxicated"). Will detests this nickname because it reminds him of his father, of whom he is ashamed. Soon after, Charlotte's father dies, and she decides to quit the band. Her father hated how she acted when she was with her ex-boyfriend, so after he got sick, she decided to change her image and be nicer to "people like Will." The band members are hurt by this discovery, but they decide to go on nonetheless, with Sa5m taking over as lead singer.

On the night of Bandslam, Charlotte comes backstage to apologize to the band for her behaviour. Will and the band accept her apology. Right before going on stage, however, they see Ben's band (the "Glory Dogs") playing the same song that I Can't Go On, I'll Go On were planning to perform, forcing them to change their act at the last minute. Will suddenly remembers the video Sa5m's mother showed him earlier and suggests that they perform "Everything I Own", since it is the only other song Sa5m knows. To buy some time, Will comes out first onstage, but at first, he is embarrassingly silent. The students begin to chant "Dewey". He starts to walk off the stage, but then comes back and decides to chant with them instead. After carrying the chant for a while, he finally changes it to, "Do we wanna ROCK?!". The band then takes the stage and performs "Everything I Own".

Although they fail to win the competition, a YouTube video of their performance gains the band popularity at school. David Bowie sees the video and sends an e-mail to Will, explaining that he is starting an indie music label and is interested in having the band as one of their first acts. Will is so excited and overwhelmed that he falls down in the middle of the school hallway.

Will and Sa5m, happily together, attend Charlotte's graduation ceremony.

== Cast ==
- Aly Michalka as Charlotte Barnes
- Vanessa Hudgens as Sa5m (pronounced Sam, with a silent number 5)
- Gaelan Connell as Will Burton
- Scott Porter as Ben Wheatley
- Lisa Kudrow as Karen Burton
- Ryan Donowho as Basher Martin
- Charlie Saxton as Bug
- Tim Jo as Omar
- Lisa Chung as Kim Lee
- Elvy Yost as Irene Lerman

In addition, David Bowie has a cameo appearance as himself.

== Production ==
=== Development ===
In January 2007, Walden Media and Summit Entertainment announced that they would co-finance the film at the time titled Will, written by Josh A. Cagan and Todd Graff, who would also serve as director. Before filming, the cast had two weeks of music rehearsals, with the actors and actresses designated to play their instruments. Ryan Donowho and Aly Michalka had extensive experience with the drums and guitar, respectively, so they were used to their instruments, but Lisa Chung, Scott Porter, and Vanessa Hudgens were not. Hudgens revealed she didn't expect there to be as much music, and "they are like, 'We are going to have two weeks of music rehearsals,' and I was like, 'What?' But it was really cool. It's definitely not the kind of music I do normally."

=== Casting ===
David Bowie began talks in early January 2007 to be in the film. Bowie had a vital role as Will Burton's idol, to whom Burton frequently wrote e-mails. He makes a short cameo in the end of the film. Liam Aiken was originally chosen to play Will, but ultimately the role was given to Gaelan Connell. When Connell auditioned for Will, he was recommended to try out for the cellist because of his background playing cello. Graff watched his cello audition, and decided to give him the starring role. Originally, Hudgens wanted to play the role of Charlotte, but she was cast for the role of Sa5m. Hudgens sang "Rehab" by Amy Winehouse for her audition, and was inspired by Wednesday Addams from The Addams Family to portray her character.

=== Filming ===
Principal photography began on February 9, 2008, in Austin, Texas. Although the film is set in New Jersey, Graff felt strongly that it was important to shoot in a place with a wide array of great live music to choose from.

Because Aly Michalka was on tour with her sister AJ Michalka and Miley Cyrus, she did not arrive in Austin until midway through rehearsals. Conveniently, the tour's last stop was in Austin, where rehearsal and filming for the movie took place. All of the instruments and singing in the movie were recorded by the actors, with the exception of the guitar parts of Vanessa Hudgens and Scott Porter, as well as Lisa Chung's piano parts. Although Hudgens and Porter learned how to play their songs, they were dubbed by guitarists Jason Mozersky and JW Wright. Music supervisors Lindsay Fellows and Linda Cohen sourced and cleared all music. Adam Lazus produced all on camera song performances at a local studio in Austin.

== Release ==
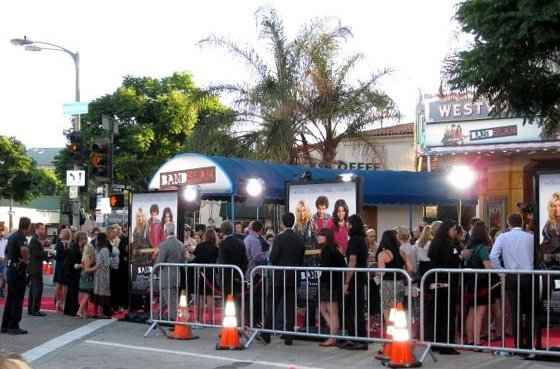
The premiere night in the Mann Village Theatre in Westwood, Los Angeles, on August 6, 2009

Bandslam held its world premiere in Westwood, California, on August 6, 2009. The film was first theatrically released on August 12, 2009, in the United Kingdom, Ireland, and France. It was released on August 13, 2009, in Australia, and on August 14 in the United States and Canada. The film was originally intended to be released on April 10, 2009. However, it was pushed back to July 31, 2009, which was the original release date once production started. It was finally moved to its eventual release date of August 14, 2009. The film was previously titled Will during production. However, it was renamed to Rock On, ultimately ending up being called Bandslam. The film was rated PG in the US for some thematic elements and mild language. In the Philippines, it was rated PG.

=== Marketing ===
Summit Entertainment spent an estimated $10 million to produce and market Bandslam. The full-length trailer was released in the internet on March 25, 2009. On June 3, 2009, the official poster was released. A novelization of the movie written by Aaron Rosenberg was released by Penguin Books on July 9, 2009. Michalka, Hudgens and Connell hosted a Bandslam Reel Thinking event at the Grammy Museum to promote the importance of music to middle-schoolers. In partnership with Magic 106.7, Summit Entertainment conducted a band contest in Boston's Burlington Mall. Hudgens and Connell attended the contest as judges. Mike Ryan won the contest and performed his original song on August 1, 2009. On August 7, 2009, Hudgens and Michalka were inducted as an honorary girl scouts by the Girl Scouts of Greater Los Angeles. During the induction, a special screening was held for the scouts present. In the United Kingdom, browser game Stardoll started a campaign which lets users dress Vanessa Hudgens in Bandslam outfits, view the film trailer, and create their own band using Stardoll scenery and virtual guitars to gift friends.

Summit Entertainment's marketing strategies have been criticized. The studio apparently received calls and e-mails from other studios' heads of marketing, saying the film's campaign may be the worst job they have seen from positioning, title, marketing tie-ins, and targeting audiences. Deadline Hollywood editor Nikki Finke released an e-mail from a Bandslam insider who pointed out that Summit's marketing have basically sold it based on their stars Hudgens and Michalka instead of selling the concept. The e-mail also claims that "they Disneyfied this movie with glitter paint". The insider commented that the bad marketing was particularly unfortunate, in result of the good reviews. Yale Daily News marked that the film had the "Worst Marketing", pointing out that "Summit Entertainment, which has a done an admirable job marketing the Twilight films, completely ruined what should have been a sleeper hit."

=== Home media ===
Bandslam was released on DVD on March 16, 2010.

== Reception ==
=== Box office ===
Despite receiving positive reviews, the film was not a box office success. Debuting at 2,121 theaters, the film only grossed $890,000 on its first day and failed to chart in the top 10. In its opening weekend, Bandslam grossed $2,231,273 in the United States and Canada, ranking #13 at the box office. The film eventually reached the top 10 and grossed $50,000 more on the same day. By the end of its run, Bandslam grossed $5,210,988 domestically and $7,014,035 internationally, totaling $12,225,023 worldwide.

=== Critical response ===
Bandslam was well-received critically, before and after it was released. The Broadcast Film Critics Association gave it an 81 rating score and a 4/4 stars rating. As of August 15, 2009, based on 20 reviews collected, Metacritic gave the film a 66% "metacritic" score, indicating generally favorable reviews. Rotten Tomatoes gives a score of 82% "fresh" rating based on 103 reviews collected; 84 "fresh" and 19 "rotten" with the reported consensus "Bandslam is an intelligent teen film that avoids teen film cliches, in an entertaining package of music and coming-of-age drama." With the positive critical response from the review Rotten Tomatoes collected, it ranked #9 in the 10 Tomatoemeters of the Summer. Comparatively, Yahoo! Movies gives a grade of "B−" averaged from 7 critic reviews. Entertainment Weekly's Lisa Schwarzbaum gave the film a "B", and praised Hudgens' and Michalka's performances as well.

Variety said that "Bandslam" will make its cracking voice heard amid the summer's boy-based blockbuster clique while Joe Williams remarked, "Although it's the wimpy teen musical that prevails, it's the misfit coming-of-age story that leaves an impression." Roger Ebert wrote on his review, that though this isn't a breakthrough movie, it's charming, and not any more innocuous than it has to be. Fort Worth Weekly revealed in their review, "The comedy subsides into some unusually heavy drama in the second half, and only Graff's assured direction keeps it from tipping over into weepiness." Empire and Digital Spy all gave Bandslam a three out of five rating while Independent Weekly and the Deseret News both gave the film two out of four.

Rene Rodriguez of The Miami Herald revealed that the film was from "the John Hughes playbook of high-school comedies but lack the heart and insight Hughes invested in his pictures.", but still praised the teenage cast saying "The performances in Bandslam are uniformly strong – good enough to make you wish this bunch of charismatic, talented kids had been given better material." Time Out reviewer Derek Adams said that Bandslam is far from exceptional, but is saved by decent character development, a cluster of engaging performances and several amusing deadpan moments. Canada's The Globe and Mail reviewer's conclusion follows: "Bandslam offers some nice observational and comedy moments, and director and co-writer Todd Graff deftly deliver the coming-of-age goods for the three main characters." The Daily Telegraph's reviewer Leight Paastch says that the film gives the genre a right old spin thanks to some lively performances and sharp pacing.

Bandslam was The Washington Post's critic choice, having a perfect score of 4/4 stars. Bandslam was somehow associated with High School Musical in a couple of reviews. However, the reviews concluded the comparisons positively, saying that Bandslam was "actually a lot quirkier than the posters would have you believe." New Jersey's local newspaper, The Star Ledger says that the plot is nicely skewed: "Basically, it's the standard teen picture – girl torn between bad boy and nice guy – with a gender switch." Michael Phillips of the Chicago Tribune praised the film by saying: "Bandslam is a pretty good movie given that the odds of it having been a pretty bad movie were steep." Andy Webster of The New York Times said that Bandslam may not entirely break new teen-movie ground, but it does offer intriguing glimpses of performers ready to bolt from the Disney stable.

Hudgens received an amount of praise from reviewers, emphasizing her transition from being associated with her previous commercial character, Gabriella Montez, multiple times. Reviewers also cited her impressive performance in the film. Even though Connell and Michalka each received their fair amount of enthusiastic press, David Waddington of North Wales Pioneer claims that Hudgens "outshines the rest of the cast, failing to fit in with the outcast narrative and making the inevitable climactic ending all the more expected." Hudgens was praised with her performance in the film that The Observer critic, Philip French said that she looks like the young Thandie Newton and "wisecracks like Dorothy Parker." French then adds that "Bandslam is a witty, touching, cleverly plotted film with excellent music."

Reviewers asserted that the film's music mainly lifted to the success of Bandslam from reviews, especially the ska version of "Everything I Own", that the film is full of unexpected pleasures set to a surprisingly retro soundtrack. Similarly, Michael Rechtshaffen of The Hollywood Reporter emphasized the effect of the film's music-driven comedy set against the backdrop of a high school battle of the bands competition which manages to come up with a fresh backbeat for the familiar alienated teen refrain, boosted by a talented cast and authentic soundtrack.

=== Accolades ===
Awards
Year	Award	Category	Recipients and nominees	Result
2009	11th Annual Golden Tomato Awards	Best Musical	Bandslam	Nominated
2010	Scribe Awards	Young Adult Novel – Best Adaption	Bandslam: The Novel	Won
2010	Gabriel Awards	Family Film of the Year	Bandslam	Won
Recognitions
Year	Award	Category	Recipients and nominees	Result
2009	indieWIRE	Best Film	Bandslam	10th
2009	indieWIRE	Best Supporting Performance	Aly Michalka	5th

== Soundtrack ==
The soundtrack was released under Hollywood Records on August 11, 2009. The soundtrack features tracks from Wilco, The Burning Hotels, Velvet Underground, Peter Bjorn and John, Seventeen Evergreen, Honor Society, the Daze, Nick Drake and David Bowie.

== The Masked Singer season 11 ==
On The Masked Singer season 11, Vanessa Hudgens as Goldfish defeated Scott Porter as Gumball to win the Golden Masked Trophy.
