= Level Up (American TV series) =

Television series

- Genre: Adventure; Science fantasy; Teen sitcom; Comedy
- Created by: Derek Guiley; David Schneiderman
- Written by: Derek Guiley & David Schneiderman; Matt Burnett; Matt Goldman; Ben Levin; Julie Whitesell; Peter Murrieta
- Directed by: Peter DeLuise; Victor Gonzalez; Savage Steve Holland; Alex Winter; Michael Robison
- Starring: Gaelan Connell; Jessie T. Usher; Connor Del Rio; Aimee Carrero; Lonny Ross
- Composers: Paul Robb; Michael Gatt; Michael Kotch
- Country of origin: United States
- Original language: English
- No. of seasons: 2
- No. of episodes: 35

Production
- Executive producers: Derek Guiley; David Schneiderman; Peter Murrieta; Brian A. Miller (Note: executive producer for Alive and Kicking, Inc.); Mark Costa; Gregg Goldin (Note: executive producer for Alive and Kicking, Inc.); Nick Weidenfeld; Rob Sorcher
- Producers: Peter Lhotka; Karen Mayeda-Vranek (Note: co-producer); Peter DeLuise (Note: supervising producer)
- Production locations: Vancouver, British Columbia, Canada
- Cinematography: Philip Linzey
- Editors: Geoffrey O'Brien; Lee Haugen; Scott Richter; David Kaldor; Pam Marshall
- Camera setup: Film; Single camera
- Running time: 22 minutes
- Production companies: D and D Productions; Alive and Kicking, Inc. Cartoon Network Studios

Original release
- Network: Cartoon Network
- Release: January 24, 2012 – February 19, 2013

Level Up is an American adventure comedy television series that aired on Cartoon Network. A film with the same title, which served as a pilot for the series, premiered on November 23, 2011. The series aired from January 24, 2012, to February 19, 2013. Level Up was the second Cartoon Network show spawned from a live-action film, with the first being Out of Jimmy's Head.

== Premise ==
After high schoolers Wyatt, Lyle, Dante and Angie unwittingly open a portal from a video game called Maldark: Conqueror of All Worlds, characters from the game and the Internet start leaking into the real world. The group consequently finds itself balancing their everyday lives with the extraordinary things that show up in their town from the virtual world, which always resorts to using NeverFail to help send the monsters back into the game by "barding" them.

== Characters ==
=== Heroes ===
- Wyatt Black (portrayed by Gaelan Connell) – Wyatt is a brilliant "techno-geek" who attains perfect grades at school. He is often shown to be a know-it-all and cannot stand when someone bests him at anything he is good at. His game avatar is "Black Death," a strong warrior with a bronze right arm. Wyatt's weapon is the "Blast-a-Ton," a weapon capable of firing almost anything as ammunition.
- Lyle Hugginson (portrayed by Jessie Usher) – Lyle plays American football and is the high school quarterback. He's a charming, popular "jock" who purposefully conceals his love of online fantasy games from other people. His video game avatar is a Dread Orc named Wizza, who wields a staff called the Thunder Pole.
- Dante Ontero (portrayed by Connor Del Rio) – Fearless and impulsive, Dante is the rebellious member of the group. He loves causing trouble to get attention as well as eating junk food or anything gross. He frequently engages in dangerous stunts on his skateboard in order to make internet videos. His video game avatar is Sir Bickle, a knight who wields a club called the Skull Cracker.
- Angie Prietto (portrayed by Aimee Carrero) – Angie is portrayed as a smart, spunky, and tenacious character, but her inquisitive nature occasionally results in problems for her. Angie does not have an avatar as she does not play the game, but her weapon from the video game is the "Fist of Schoolage," a glove that becomes an armored fist.
- Max Ross (portrayed by Lonny Ross) – Max Ross created the online fantasy game "Conqueror of All Worlds." He's an eccentric multi-billionaire with a taste for conspiracy theories. Following the events of Maldark's attack, Max has become an associate to the kids. He was previously portrayed by Eric André in the film.
  - Laserbot (voiced by Andrea Fraser-Winsby) – A robot created by Max Ross.
- Joaquin Prietto (portrayed by Isaiah Lehtinen) – Angie's little brother who is a prodigy at everything he does as the guys are jealous when their talents are outdone. He befriends the guys when they babysit him and is also a fan of "Conquer of All Worlds." In "The 4 Harolds! What? Oh. The 4 Heralds!" Joaquin finally learns the truth about the Leaks. He later officially joined NeverFail and began using his video game character's weapon, "The War Hammer of Splat."

=== Villains ===
- Maldark (portrayed by John Novak) – The main antagonist of the series. He is a ruthless and narcissistic sorcerer from the "Conqueror of All Worlds" video game whose sole mission is to seek out new worlds and either destroy them or conquer them. He was portrayed by George Faughnan in the film.
- Hideo Nojima (portrayed by James Rha) – A Japanese multi-billionaire game designer of the mobile game "Mystery Puzzle Puncher." He is the rival of Max Ross whose rivalry has gone on since an early career in game designing, college, and elementary school. He came to Daventry Hills to destroy Max Ross with his business.

=== Leaks ===
Some of the Leaks are creatures from "Conqueror of All Worlds" that have leaked into Earth. There are also other Leaks that come from anything associated with the Internet. The following are listed in order of appearance:

- Holiday Orcs – A group of Christmas-themed orcs. They were "barded" by the male Mountain Barbarian.
- Mountain Barbarians – The Mountain Barbarians are human warriors that have curiosity and strength. After the male Mountain Barbarian (portrayed by Mark Gibbon) helped to defeat the Holiday Orcs, Dante and his friends had the male Mountain Barbarian pass off as an exchange student named Bob Arian when they are unable to send it back into the game. The Mountain Barbarian's wife (portrayed by Hailey Birnie) leaked onto Earth and managed to get the Mountain Barbarian back into the game.
- Morthorn Worm – A creature from the "beta" version of the game. Its home was deleted by Max, which caused it to break through to the real world and make wormholes.
- Black Death (portrayed by Dave Collette) – Wyatt's avatar. He was sent to the human world when Wyatt accidentally spills his soda onto his keyboard. Because he is an avatar, he cannot move on his own, requiring somebody to control him via keyboard.
- Bicyclops (portrayed by Jason Simpson) – A cyclops with two eyes. The Bicyclopes have poor vision and must wear special glasses that can read people's emotions, feelings, and thoughts to see.
- Silversmith Dwarf
- Scorcaling Forest Goracal
- Exploding Meemees
- Fewards of Flail Land
- Hampire (portrayed by Andy Nez) – A creature that is part vampire, part hamster. The Hampire has the appearance of a vampire and can turn into a hamster. He was created by Maldark and sent to the human world to spy on the NeverFail clan.
- Rainbow Rider – A high-speed rainbow sprite.
- Snotling Goggler
- Habanero Dragon – A Lvl. 72 dragon who is the boss of Scofield Dungeon.
- Max's Profile (portrayed by Lonny Ross) – A dating profile of Max Ross that leaked out from the Internet. When the gang deleted the profile, he disappeared.
- Dupligänger – A two-headed monster with one side of its body being red while the other side of its body is yellow. It needs to be attacked with two weapons simultaneously or else it will split into two.
- Trash Troll – A troll who will trash anything. They resemble Swamp Trolls, but have mud, dirt, and green splatter all over them. He is known for stealing everything from players he beats in the game, and putting the people themselves inside his sack.
- Jack (portrayed by Morgan Roff) – The main character from Jack and the Beanstalk who leaked out of Dante's eBook. After NeverFail got Jack to listen to reason upon bringing out the Big Bad Wolf, Dante manages to get Jack and the Giant to work on their aggression by using foam bats.
- Giant (portrayed by John DeSantis) – A giant from Jack and the Beanstalk who leaked out of Dante's eBook. Dante always thought of him as a bad guy, but after he finds out that Jack is a thief, he realizes that the Giant has a reason to hate Jack. Dante manages to get Jack and the Giant to work on their aggression by using foam bats.
- Snow White (portrayed by Kendra Anderson) – The titled story book character who leaked out to help negotiate with Jack.
- Sherlock Holmes (portrayed by Tariq Leslie) – NeverFail leaked him out in order to help find Jack.
- Big Bad Wolf – NeverFail had to bring out the Big Bad Wolf in order to negotiate with Jack.
- Jester – An odd humanoid creature with a bugle for a mouth. It rewards players for completing its fetch quest.
- Woodland Fairy
- Acid-Spitting Mini Dragon – A miniature dragon of blended purple-red color that flies and spits acid. Their weakest spots are their wings.
- Sir Guy (portrayed by Christopher Gauthier) – An NPC nobleman who needs Dante's help to complete a side quest so he can level up.
- Five-Armed Blood Marauder (portrayed by Michasha Armstrong) – A marauder with five arms.
- Skunkbear (portrayed by John DeSantis) – A humanoid creature that is part skunk, part bear.
- Bounty Hunter (portrayed by Jud Tylor) – A female shape-shifting bounty hunter with horns who leaks from the game after Angie accidentally pastes a photo of Wyatt on a wall of wanted people in the game.
- Merchant (portrayed by Richard Newman) – The 10th evilest character in "Conqueror of All Worlds". He was purposely leaked by Max Ross to promote his new expansion pack.
- Swirling Giver (portrayed by Tony Alcantar) – Also known as "Swirly", the Swirling Giver is a leak that hands out gold and in return demands to be paid back.
- Invizio (portrayed by Nolan Prasad) – A ghost who leaks into the high school. He lived in a ghost town until NeverFail brought all the ghosts back to life. Invizio wanted revenge on them for that action. When Lyle managed to bring him back to life, Wyatt defeats him in order to bard him back into the game.
- Courtesy Cat (portrayed by Brian McCaig) – A talking humanoid cat wearing a blue sweater who offers helpful advice to people. When angered from his warnings being ignored, he turns into the Heckfire Tiger (portrayed by Paul Lazenby), a tiger-themed wrestler.
- Asp (portrayed by Laura Soltis) – A servant of Maldark with a snake-like appearance. She searches for a weak spot in order to get Maldark to get to Earth while posing as the vice principal of Crosstown High School.
- Vomit Varmit – A small purple troll that emits blue vomit.
- Glamazons – A group of Amazonian warriors who seek out and challenge the strongest people called "The Glamazonian Death Challenge". The challenge consists of three events that involve speed, hand-to-hand combat, and accuracy. The winner receives a prize, while the loser loses their head. The prize is to be sacrificed to Rhea. Once Rhea was defeated, the Glamazons were freed from Rhea.
  - Glamazon Queen (portrayed by Karen Holness) – The Queen of the Glamazons.
  - Grinella (portrayed by Sharon Taylor) – Member of the Glamazons.
- Rhea (portrayed by Karin Konoval) – A Gorgon that the Glamazons have been menaced by. She often accepts sacrifices that involve giving up the winner of the Glamazon Death Challenge to her.
- Dwarven Butler – A dwarf butler who wears 16th-century/steampunk-based attire.
- Potions Wizard (portrayed by Jay Brazeau) – A wizard who makes potions that leaked out of the game and gave Dante a free potion in exchange for not leaking him. His plan is to put everyone sleep with sleep powder and to shrink the Earth like he's done with several other planets. He was barded by Lyle.
- Wachupa – A small reptilian creature in the game that is based on a fictional urban legend. In the game, it is a pet created by Max Ross to be a pet that reviews constant love and attention. If it does not receive love and attention, it will explode.
- Moo Man (portrayed by Patrick Sabongui) – A man with bull-like hooves, horns, and tendencies who wears a nose ring. The Moo Men are known to attack villages and take breaks in their attacks by grazing in the fields.
- Hugo Vega Soro (portrayed by Reinaldo Zavarce) – A leak that felt like an outcast in his world due to him being the son of a Moo Man. He left the game to live a peaceful life. Hugo eventually became an author of Wyatt's favorite comic book "The Peaceful Prince," a book based on his life in the game. After dealing with Hugo's father, NeverFail allowed Hugo to remain in the real world.
- Dante Jr. – A web cartoon created by Dante on Max's computer that leaked out of the game and went on a rampage. He kidnapped Dante's history teacher after giving a Dante a bad grade. Dante Jr. was barded by NeverFail.
- Thomas Jeffer: Son of Frankenstein (portrayed by Rodger Barton) – A Frankenstein's monster-themed 18th Century revolutionary who was another web cartoon created by Dante as a part of a history class assignment. He was leaked out by Dante to take on Dante Jr. by using his non-sensual creativity and genius. After Dante Jr. was defeated, Max decided to put Jeffer in "Conqueror of All Worlds".
- Puzzle Puncher Boxer (portrayed by Darcy Hinds) – A boxing character from "Mystery Puzzle Puncher".
- Mystery Puzzle Cube – A puzzle cube leaked out by Hideo.
- Evil Hideo (portrayed by James Rha) – A leak designed by Hideo in his own image as a wizard. He was barded by Max and his Laserbot.
- John (portrayed by Sean Tyson) – A blacksmith that was leaked out by Dante to pose as his dad when meeting with Vice-Principal Elmhurst to talk about Dante's suspension. He was known to feud with Nessus who was in love with John's horse Cinnamon. Once John and Nessus were in the same area, Wyatt barded both of them with a single missile.
- Nessus (portrayed by Matt Ward) – A centaur who once sold his magic horseshoe to Lyle. He has been in love with a horse named Cinnamon and was hunted by John the Blacksmith. When Barbara caught a glimpse of him, she fainted at first sight. Once John and Nessus were in the same area, Wyatt barded both of them with a single missile. He was named for the centaur who killed the Greek hero Hercules.
- Ochi (portrayed by Alex Zahara) – An orc who is the former right-hand man of King Okavango. He cleaned up NeverFail's hideout and worked as their servant. NeverFail took him for granted and Ochi ended up being an unwitting pawn in Okavango's revenge scheme.
- King Okavango (portrayed by Mark Acheson) – An orc king who was overthrown by NeverFail.
- Titocona (portrayed by Mig Macario) – An NPC zen monk that Lyle had taken pacifist lessons from. Titocona leaked out of the game in order to set Mr. Cochrane straight. He chased after Mr. Cochrane until he was barded by Angie. Afterwards, Mr. Cochrane believed that Titocona's attack was part of Prank Week.
- Cactus Kaiser (portrayed by Andy Thompson) – A humanoid cactus that comes from the Deutsch Desert and possesses poisonous spines.
- Heralds of the Maldarkian Apocalypse – A group of four monster that bring about the Maldarkian Apocalypse (also known as the Maldarkalypse).
  - Ice Titan (portrayed by Fraser Aitcheson) – An ice-elemental monster.
  - Fire Titan (portrayed by Aidan Pringle) – A fire-elemental monster.
  - Wind Titan – A wind-elemental monster.
  - Water Titan (portrayed by Paul Lazenby) – A water-elemental monster.
- Momcubus (portrayed by Chelah Horsdal) – A six-armed monster created by Dante on Max's computer. The Momcubus was modeled after Barbara. She was barded by Joaquin.
- Lord of the Pies (portrayed by Jeremy Raymond) – A human with a pie-shaped hat. He comes to NeverFail when his son had leaked onto Earth and couldn't find him. NeverFail was able to reunite him with his son offscreen.
- Bard (portrayed by Michael Teigen) – A bard that NeverFail leaked out to help convince Joaquin into helping NeverFail.
- Insult Slug (voiced by Pat Fraley) – A pink slug that can perform insult comedy upon anyone. It was leaked by Dante to help convince Joaquin into helping NeverFail.

=== Other characters ===
- Principal Storms (portrayed by Lorne Cardinal) – The Principal of Daventry Hills North High School.
- Vice Principal Elmhurst (portrayed by Sarah Strange) – The vice-principal of Daventry Hills North High School.
- Coach Farber (portrayed by Kurt Evans) – The football coach of Daventry Hills North High School.
- Dave (voiced by Keith Blackman Davis) – The janitor of Daventry Hills North High School.
- Barbara (portrayed by Chelah Horsdal) – The mother of Dante, who calls her by her first name. She and Dante have a poor relationship. Barbara was previously portrayed by Rhoda Griffs in the film.
- Teddy Black (portrayed by Tobias Slezak) – The father of Wyatt.
- Mayor Hugginson (portrayed by Peter James Bryant) – The father of Lyle and the Mayor of Daventry Hills. He was previously portrayed by Geoffrey Williams in the film.
- Big Joe (portrayed by Kurt Ostlund) – Big Joe is the school bully who picks mainly on Wyatt.
- Reggie (portrayed by Sunee Dhaliwal) – Reggie is on the football team and is Lyle's friend.
- Weird Karl (portrayed by Albert Ageman) – Karl is a creepy-looking kid who makes his own choices, and is suspicious about Wyatt and his friends.
- Gus (portrayed by Erik McNamee) – Gus is an awkward acting boy who has a major crush on Angie though she doesn't return the feelings.
- Philbert (portrayed by Samuel Patrick Chu) – Philbert is a daredevil who is always seen with Dante or Wyatt, and is Angie's crush.
- Natalie (portrayed by Chanelle Peloso) – A overachieving school girl that speaks in a lisp. She is suspicious of the gang and also runs the "Conspiracy Club" a club dedicated to solving the town's conspiracy aka the Leaks (including the recent Skunkbear sightings) and come close until her group is discredited on live TV.
- Davis (portrayed by Michael Warren Choi) – A small kid with black hair. He is best friends with Jim and they always seen together. They are part of the "Conspiracy Club".
- Jim (portrayed by Luke McAndless-Davis) – He is a tall kid with curly brown hair. He is best friends with Davis. Also is member of Natalie's "Conspiracy Club".
- Ginger (portrayed by Siobhan Williams) – Ginger is the know-it-all sassy member of student council and Wyatt's Quiz Bowl Team.
- Roxanne – A Canadian girl who Wyatt has a crush on. But she dates with Gus in the finale due to she really liking cowardly boys.
- Leroy (portrayed by Aren Buchholz) – Lyle's old friend who moved back to town he is aware that Dante hangs out with the guys and loves to play "Conqueror of All Worlds." He enjoys pranking and goes completely overboard such as wrecking the running man in HQ, framing Wyatt for using a freeze ray, ruining Lyle's quest in game, and standing up Angie. He ends up getting payback after a run in with a leak, but the gang plays it off as a joke. Leroy is suspicious and swears vengeance.
- Mr. Cochrane (portrayed by Panou) – A strict teacher who had previously left to attend an anger management class. He was so strict that even Principal Storms was afraid of him. When Lyle finally stood up to him, Titocona attacked and chased after Mr. Cochrane.

== Episodes ==
=== Series overview ===
Season	Episodes	Originally released	
Season	Episodes	First released	Last released
Pilot film		November 23, 2011	
1	22	January 24, 2012	September 18, 2012
2	13	October 23, 2012	February 19, 2013

=== Pilot film (2011) ===
Title	Directed by	Written by	Original release date	U.S. viewers (millions)
Level Up	Peter Lauer	Derek Guiley & David Schneiderman	November 23, 2011	2.549
Four completely different regular high school teenagers take on a dark leader named Maldark, who goes haywire by escaping from a video game and brings in havoc by bringing in various different monsters (such as ghouls, trolls, etc.) to the real world, and where a battle becomes released. Now the four teens must fight together for experience, take out Maldark and his minions and save the real world.

=== Season 1 (2012) ===
No. overall	No. in season	Title	Directed by	Written by	Original release date	Prod. code	U.S. viewers (millions)
1	1	"Barbarian"	Michael Rohl	Derek Guiley & David Schneiderman	January 24, 2012	106	2.09
The gang decide to make use of a barbarian who has made his way to the real world.
2	2	"A Heart-Worming Tale"	Michael Robison	Matt Burnett & Ben Levin	January 31, 2012	110	1.77
The gang find a network of magic passageways, but using them soon leads to chaos.
3	3	"Wyatt Presents: Avatar in 3D"	Michael Robison	Julie Whitesell	February 7, 2012	109	1.68
Wyatt's avatar Black Death leaks from the game, and he decides to capitalize on the situation by having the avatar help him impress a girl.
4	4	"Bicyclops"	Victor Gonzalez	Natalie Antoci & Gretchen Enders	February 14, 2012	112	1.75
The gang want to keep a pair of magic glasses (that can detect other people's thoughts), but a Bicyclops from the game has other plans.
5	5	"Leroy"	Savage Steve Holland	Matt Goldman	February 20, 2012	108	1.40
Lyle's old friend Leroy comes to town and treats everyone badly. Note: This episode originally aired after the 2012 Hall of Game Awards on Cartoon Network, and after that did not air again until March 6, 2012 and was advertised as a new episode.
6	6	"Hampire Weeknight"	Jonathan Judge	Derek Guiley & David Schneiderman	February 21, 2012	116	1.70
Maldark sends a Hampire (a creature that's part vampire, part hamster) to Earth where it is let loose in the school by accident by Angie.
7	7	"Sole Provider"	Savage Steve Holland	Peter Murrieta	February 28, 2012	107	1.53
After defeating a Rainbow Rider from the game, the trio finds a pair of magical super-speed boots. Instead of storing them, however, Dante decides to use them for his own purposes.
8	8	"Max Squared"	Peter DeLuise	Matt Burnett & Ben Levin	March 13, 2012	102	1.51
Dante is having problems with his mom constantly bugging him. When an internet dating profile of Max Ross leaks out, it solves one problem while creating a new one.
9	9	"Blast-a-ton 2.0"	Peter DeLuise	Matt Burnett & Ben Levin	April 3, 2012	113	1.41
Wyatt obtains a new weapon upgrade that makes him mad with power.
10	10	"Charm Bracelet"	Michael Rohl	Julie Whitesell	April 10, 2012	105	1.18
Lyle's dad wants him to run for class president, but Lyle does not want to. So Angie runs for class president, and the guys decide to give her a boost with a magic bracelet from the game.
11	11	"You Don't Know Jack"	Victor Gonzalez	Peter Murrieta	April 17, 2012	111	1.27
Dante's favorite story character Jack from Jack and the Beanstalk leaks from an e-book into the real world, and Dante is soon disappointed by Jack when it turns out that he still continues stealing even when the giant from the story leaks into the real world in pursuit of Jack to get back the items that were stolen from him.
12	12	"Headquarters"	Henry Chan	Matt Goldman	April 24, 2012	103	1.46
The guys set up shop in Max's warehouse and decide to throw a party that doesn't go as planned. Note: This episode occurs after "Wanted" but before the rest of the episodes in the timeline due to episodes being aired out of production order.
13	13	"Acid Spittin' Mini Dragon"	Jonathan Judge	Matt Goldman	June 5, 2012	115	1.89
While Wyatt spends time hanging out with Angie's little brother, Dante and Lyle face off against a tough new enemy in the form of an Acid-Spitting Mini Dragon.
14	14	"Leveling Up"	Peter DeLuise	Peter Murrieta	June 12, 2012	101	1.54
When Dante's procrastinating causes an NPC named Sir Guy to leak from the game, he is forced to take the responsibility for it in the form of helping Sir Guy complete side quests to defeat an elite Five-Armed Blood Marauder.
15	15	"The Conspiracy Club"	Michael Robison	Derek Guiley & David Schneiderman	June 26, 2012	114	1.74
The boys must join a new club at school to see how close they are to exposing their secret lives while at the same time pursuing a dangerous Skunkbear.
16	16	"Wanted"	Henry Chan	Derek Guiley & David Schneiderman	July 3, 2012	104	1.22
In a prequel to the TV series, Wyatt finds a bounty hunter trying to kill him, but no matter how hard he tries, he can't convince Lyle or Dante that it even exists. Note: This episode occurs after the pilot but before "Headquarters" in the timeline due to episodes being aired out of production order.
17	17	"The Dark Marts"	Jon Rosenbaum	Julie Whitesell	July 31, 2012	118	1.18
A merchant leaks out from the game, and Max uses him to announce his new expansion pack. But when he tries to rule the world, NeverFail has a tough time defeating him.
18	18	"The Swirling Giver"	Jon Rosenbaum	Julie Whitesell	August 14, 2012	117	1.31
A leak from the game lends Lyle some gold. Then, in order for Lyle to repay him, the Swirling Giver tells him to bring in Dante so he can eat his face.
19	19	"Invizio's Revenge"	Alex Winter	Matt Burnett & Ben Levin	August 21, 2012	119	1.19
A ghost leaks into the high school where it ends up haunting it. Meanwhile, a television crew does a story on Lyle.
20	20	"Heckfire Tiger"	Alex Winter	Richard Goodman	September 4, 2012	120	1.25
The high school football team starts to get involved in the game and cause an automated moderator to leak from it.
21	21	"Wyatt Crosses Over"	Peter DeLuise	Natalie Antoci & Gretchen Enders	September 11, 2012	121	1.11
Wyatt gets a chance to transfer over to Cross Townhigh where his genius can be accepted. It's really a trick as a leak named Asp plans to weaken Never Fail on Maldark's behalf and beat them without their leader.
22	22	"So You Think You Can Go to the Dance?"	Peter DeLuise	Peter Murrieta, David Schneiderman & Derek Guiley	September 18, 2012	122	1.06
The gang plans a night off by attending the school dance. Unfortunately for them, Maldark has found a way to get to Earth so that he can attack it again.

=== Season 2 (2012–13) ===
No. overall	No. in season	Title	Directed by	Written by	Original release date
23	1	"Little HQ of Horrors"	Savage Steve Holland	Derek Guiley & David Schneiderman	October 23, 2012
Wyatt leaks out a vine to defeat Joaquin when his being good at everything gets him into a high school class, but it soon barrels out of control.
24	2	"Lice Guys Bathe Last"	Alex Winter	Matt Burnett & Ben Levin	October 30, 2012
A zombie-like outbreak occurs when lice leak from the game.
25	3	"Should She Stay or Should She Go"	Peter DeLuise	Matt Goldman	November 6, 2012
Angie competes in a Glamazonian death challenge.
26	4	"Intelligence Potion #9"	Peter DeLuise	Julie Whitesell	November 13, 2012
Dante becomes extremely smart from a magic potion that a wizard gave him, but the wizard wants to take over the world.
27	5	"A Wizza's Best Friend"	Peter DeLuise	Matt Goldman	November 20, 2012
Lyle takes in a pet leaked from the game, but soon the government has custody of the creature. Yet Max had designed the pet so that if it doesn't receive proper love, it will explode.
28	6	"A Leak Among Us"	Alex Winter	Derek Guiley & David Schneiderman	November 27, 2012
After secretly being aided by a mysterious leak that's blend itself amongst the citizens of Daventry Hills, Wyatt later becomes fast friends with his favorite author but this comic writer has a secret that Wyatt must hide from the gang.
29	7	"Thomas Jeffer, Son of Frankenstein"	Peter DeLuise	Peter Murrieta & Matt Goldman	December 4, 2012
Dante creates a bizarre monster for a school video project. But when the teacher gives Dante an 'F', he accidentally leaks out Dante Junior (a monstrous version of himself). So the gang has to leak out the original monster to help.
30	8	"Max vs. Hideo"	Peter DeLuise	Matt Burnett & Ben Levin	January 22, 2013
Max's rival Hideo Nojima comes to town to destroy Max's business.
31	9	"All Lies That Ends Lies"	Peter DeLuise	Peter Murrieta	January 29, 2013
Lyle obtains a magic horseshoe from a centaur named Nessus in order to be good at the horseshoe toss during the Daventry Hills Father and Son Berrylympics. Wyatt tries to cover up the truth about his father. After getting suspended by Vice-Principal Elmhurst, Dante leaks out a blacksmith named John to pose as his dad for a Parent-Teacher Conference with her while trying to keep his mom from finding out what happened at school. Angie protests against the unfairness of girls not being able to compete in the Berrylympics.
32	10	"A Little Help Please"	Savage Steve Holland	Julie Whitesell	February 5, 2013
When NeverFail defeats an orc named King Okavango in "Conqueror of All Worlds", his former right-hand Orc Ochi leaks into Earth and manages to clean up NeverFail's hang-out.
33	11	"Dante and Angie's Mascor Skating Video"	Victor Gonzalez	Peter Murrieta	February 12, 2013
The gang braces themselves when angry teacher Mr. Cochrane returns to school, but Lyle is convinced that a zen approach can handle the problem.
34	12	"The 4 Harolds! What? Oh. the 4 Heralds!"	Peter DeLuise	Matt Goldman	February 19, 2013
When the Heralds of the Maldarkian Apocalypse leak onto Earth, NeverFail turns to Joaquin for help. Note: Joaquin finally learns the truth about the Leaks in this episode.
35	13	"War Hammer Time"	Victor Gonzalez	Gretchen Enders	February 19, 2013
Joaquin questions his decision to join NeverFail as they try to help Joaquin make up his mind.

== Home media ==
Region 1

DVD title	Aspect ratio	Time length	Bonus features	Release date
Level Up: The Movie	1.78:1	90 minutes	A never before seen episode of Level Up titled "Wanted" and a music video from the series.	May 1, 2012
