= Helicopter Mom =

2014 film

- Film poster
- Directed by: Salomé Breziner
- Written by: Duke Tran
- Produced by: Salomé Breziner; Josh Cole; Stephen Israel; J.M.R. Luna
- Starring: Nia Vardalos
- Cinematography: Chris Squires
- Edited by: Jacob Chase; Colleen Halsey; Richard Halsey
- Music by: Jeff Cardoni
- Production company: American Film Productions
- Distributed by: Entertainment One
- Release date: June 4, 2014 (Seattle)
- Running time: 81 minutes
- Country: United States
- Language: English

Helicopter Mom is a 2014 American comedy film directed by Salomé Breziner and starring Nia Vardalos.

The overbearing mother (Nia Vardalos) of a sexually undecided teenager (Jason Dolley) tells everyone that he's gay to submit an application on his behalf for a college scholarship for LGBT students.

== Plot ==
High school senior Lloyd's mother Maggie Cooper constantly fawns all over him. Taking him to Venice Beach for his 17th birthday, she's already talking about eventually losing him when he'll meet a girl, get married etc. and forget her.

When Lloyd says perhaps he'll turn out to be gay, Maggie outs him by pushing him into a group of tough-looking motorcycle riders. One in particular is very aggressive, so she slaps him so they have to run.

At his high school, Lloyd discovers his mother has plastered the halls with a poster announcing his birthday. In English class his teacher insists he read his poem in a larger school function but he, and his close friend concurs, that he can't do public speaking. Classmate Carrie asks him to show her some of his poetry.

At home Maggie relentlessly pesters Lloyd about his sexuality. He suggests she join the PTA, like other moms if she insists on knowing about things at school. At Maggie's first meeting, she butts heads with the bossy PTA chair Barbara Wolfe.

Talking with her friend Norma after the meeting, Maggie discovers the high cost of college tuition. Realizing Lloyd will need a scholarship, as Norma lists gays as an eligible minority groups, she gushes about how great having a gay son would be.

At his school's Festival of the Arts, Lloyd tries to recite his poem, but is mortified when overbearing Maggie gets on stage. She publicly confronts a heckler, and is removed by security.

Lloyd's dad Max has to bail Maggie out of jail. Later, at the house as Lloyd sleeps, she asks him to reach out to their son as she's convinced he's gay. At the next PTA meeting, the chair continues to be condescending. Afterwards, as she's assigned cleanup, she stuffs the ballot box with votes for Lloyd for prom king.

The next day, Lloyd is embarrassed to be one of the many candidates for the prom court. He finds himself with Carrie, who feels they have a special bond as her also crazy mom is the PTA chair and greatly dislikes his mom.

Max takes Lloyd for his first drink. The teen doesn't want to be labeled, as he's yet to have even kissed anyone, and is unsure if he'd prefer to be with a male or female.

Maggie and Max take Lloyd out to celebrate his acceptance at NYU. She invites Parker, a young gay man, to meet Lloyd. He wants to leave, but his mom convinces him to stay to try and get to know a gay man. As Parker very dramatically describes his love life, Max helps Lloyd leave by staging a food allergy.

As father and son hang out, seeing Carrie, Max sees she is flirting with Lloyd. As they walk, he shows his son spots where he and Maggie had memorable moments, as they were high school sweethearts there. Max insists Lloyd be less self-deprecating.

At a preliminary scholarship interview, Maggie tags along, uninvited. Trying to coach him, she loudly prompts Lloyd to mention the prom king nomination, so she introduces herself.

At school, Preston's ex attacks Lloyd as he believes he's trying to steal him, and Carrie defends him. Afterwards, talking about the prom, she says she's going stag. He hasn't got a date, so proposes they go together. Carrie is surprised, believing him to be gay. He lists a few reasons he likes and admires her, so she accepts.

When Maggie hears that Lloyd is taking Carrie to the prom, she gets angry at Max, believing he's corrupted him. She chews him out, calling him a deadbeat dad although she's discouraged contact between them for the last decade.

As Lloyd leaves for the prom, Max arrives to make Maggie dinner. She sneaks off to prom and tries to pay Carrie to leave, as she's organized a gay date for Lloyd. Finding out, Lloyd defiantly kisses him then Carrie passionately. He then tells the scholarship rep that it was his mother who had applied. As he's unsure of his sexual orientation he suggests he find someone else.

Lloyd and Carrie leave together, and when Maggie says he blew the scholarship he doesn't care. He had chosen NYU to be far from her. Ironically, it's revealed they won king and queen.

Lloyd heads off to NYU, and once he's settled both of his parents surprise him. Back together, they invite him out to dinner.

== Cast ==
- Nia Vardalos as Maggie
- Jason Dolley as Lloyd
- Mark Boone Junior as Max
- Kate Flannery as Norma
- Scott Shilstone as Brad
- Skyler Samuels as Carrie

== Promotion ==
A single by Lisa Loeb, "3, 2, 1, Let Go", was released in support of the film on February 17, 2017. The b-side, "The Disappointing Pancake", featured actor Steve Martin and bass player Leland Sklar. Loeb herself also made a cameo appearance in the film.

== Reception ==
The film has a 29% rating on Rotten Tomatoes, based on 7 critical reviews. Sandie Angulo Chen of Common Sense Media gave the film two stars out of five.
