= California Burrito (India) =

Indian fast casual restaurant chain

- A California Burrito outlet
- Type: Private
- Industry: Restaurants
- Genre: Fast casual restaurant
- Founded: 2012; 14 years ago (Bangalore, Karnataka, India)
- Founder: Bert Mueller; Dharam Khalsa; Gaelan Connell
- Headquarters: Indiranagar, Bengaluru, Karnataka, India
- Number of locations: 128 (2026)
- Area served: Bangalore; Hyderabad; Delhi; Noida; Gurugram; Chennai
- Products: Burritos; tacos; salads; nachos; rice bowls
- Number of employees: 2,060 (2025)
- Website: californiaburrito.in

California Burrito is an Indian fast-casual restaurant chain specialising in Mexican cuisine, founded in 2012. As of 2025, California Burrito operates over 100 stores across Bangalore, Hyderabad, Delhi, Noida, Gurugram, and Chennai.

== History ==
California Burrito was founded in 2012 by Bert Mueller, Dharam Khalsa, and Gaelan Connell. In October 2012, Mueller returned to India with $250,000 from personal connections and the founders' savings to open the first outlet at Embassy Golf Links in Bangalore. The outlet generated 0.5 million dollars in revenue in the first year.

In 2020, it had 37 stores and ₹4 crore in monthly revenue before a COVID-19-induced dip to ₹25 lakh. In 2024, California Burrito reported $23 million in revenue according to a CNBC report. In 2025, California Burrito launched its 100th store.

== Operations ==
The company collaborates with Indian farmers to cultivate avocados, tomatillos, beans, and chipotle chilies.

In 2024, the chain employed 1,405 staff and served an average of 2,404 burritos and 4,321 tacos daily.

As of 2025, California Burrito operates 110 outlets with about 2000 employees across six Indian cities: Bangalore (its headquarters), Hyderabad, Delhi, Noida, Gurugram, and Chennai.
