= Jeff Cardoni =

Musical artist

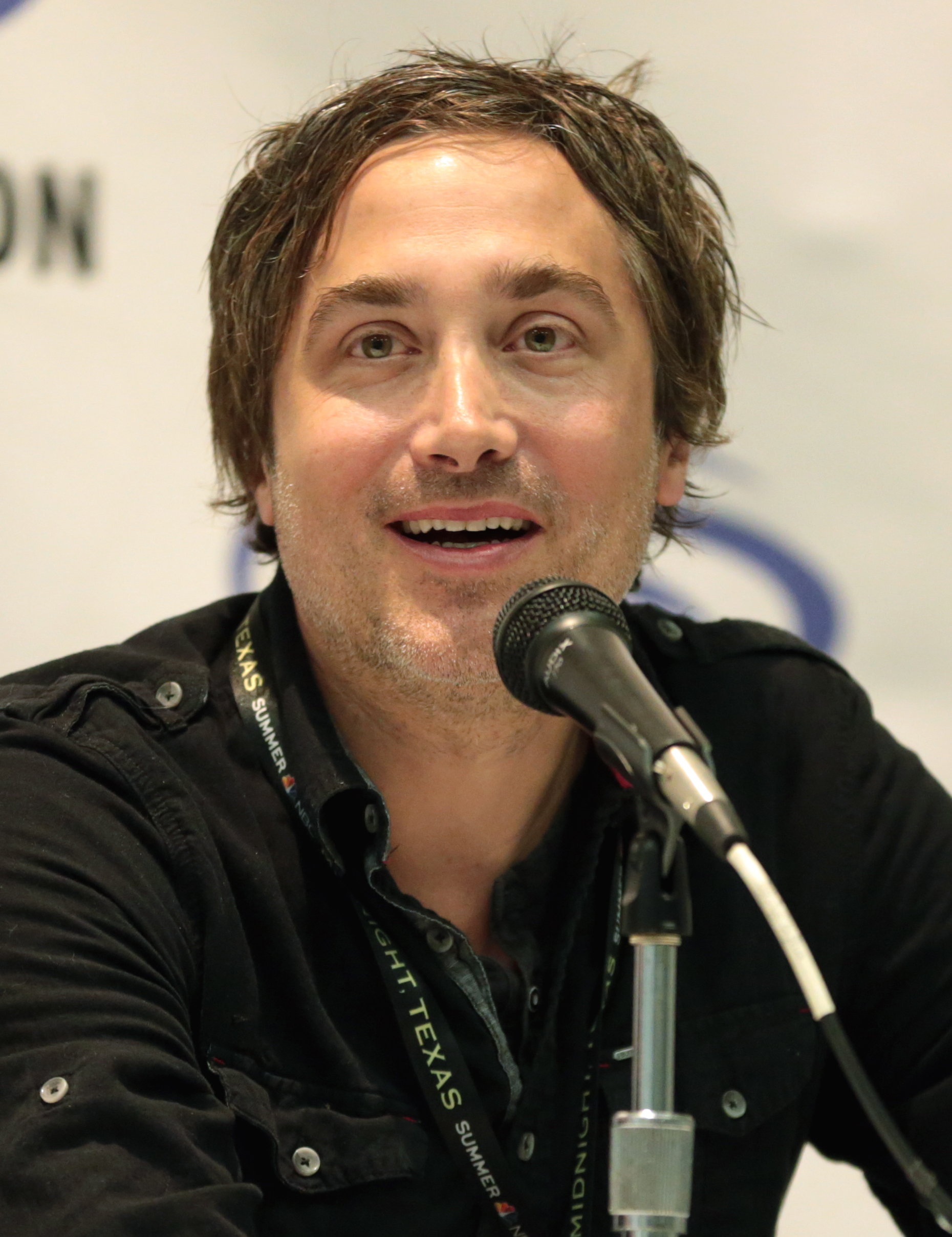
- Cardoni in 2017

Background information
- Born: Jeffrey E. Cardoni; Wilkes-Barre, Pennsylvania, U.S.
- Origin: United States
- Genres: Film score, electronic, rock
- Occupations: Composer, Songwriter, Arranger, Musician
- Instruments: Piano, keyboards, synthesizer, guitar, percussion, musical saw, autoharp
- Years active: 2000–present
- Formerly of: Alien Crime Syndicate
- Website: jeffcardoni.com

Jeffrey E. Cardoni is an American composer. He is a multi-instrumentalist who studied classical piano before playing drums and guitar in numerous bands, including a brief stint with the rock band Alien Crime Syndicate. He also wrote the theme song for "Young Sheldon" "Mighty Little Man."

== Biography ==
After graduating James M. Coughlin High School, Cardoni studied engineering at Pennsylvania State University. Cardoni is best known for his work on television projects such as CSI: Miami, Silicon Valley (TV series), Ghosts (American TV series), Heels (TV series), The League, Wilfred, and film scores, such as Me Time (film), Step Up: All In, The Vicious Kind, Just Friends, Firehouse Dog, and many others. Cardoni also did the score for Open Season 3.

Cardoni studied classical piano beginning age 7. While touring with Alien Crime Syndicate, the group's manager suggested he enroll in UCLA film scoring classes. It was these courses that piqued Cardoni's interest in the film music industry.

Cardoni has stated that his classical training has greatly informed his compositional style—whereas many composers prioritize computer technology in their scores and workflows, he prefers to work with musical instruments whenever possible, and continues to hand notate themes in his scores whenever taking on a new project. He also identifies himself as partial to "old-fashioned" scores that put melody above ambient sonic textures. Despite this proclivity, he recognizes that the current nature of the film music industry necessitates familiarity and fluency with various pieces of software and technology, which he includes in his current studio setup. Cardoni has explained that the meeting point between the worlds of technology and melodic counterpoint has informed some of his scores, including The Secret Lives of Dorks (2013).

Depending on the project, Cardoni is known to use a variety of unique instruments, including bowed xylophones, bowed saws and autoharps.

== Awards and nominations ==
Cardoni was nominated in 2006 for a Silver Ariel Award for Best Original Score.

== Selected filmography ==
Year	Title	Notes
2026	I'm Chevy Chase and You're Not	Composer
2025	Playdate	Composer
2024	Players	Composer
2022	Me Time	Composer
2021	Ghosts	Composer
2021	Young Sheldon	Composer
2021	Heels	Composer
2020	LA's Finest	Composer
2019	Can You Keep a Secret?	Composer
2019	The Kominsky Method	Composer
2018	Furlough	Composer
2017	Training Day	Composer
2017	Girlboss	Composer
2017	The Female Brain	Composer
2017	Once Upon a Time in Venice	Composer
2017	Bad Kids of Crestview Academy	Composer
2016	Mike and Dave Need Wedding Dates	Composer
2016	Cooper Barrett's Guide to Surviving Life	Composer
2016	I Voted	Composer
2016	Middle School: The Worst Years of My Life	Composer
2016	Speechless	Composer
2016	Fantastic Lies	Composer
2016	The Confirmation	Composer
2015-2016	The Grinder	Composer
2015	The Better Half	Composer
2014-	Silicon Valley	Composer
2014	Miss Meadows	Composer
2014	Step Up: All In	Composer
2014	Married	Composer
2014	Helicopter Mom	Composer
2014	Atari: Game Over	Additional music
2014	The Lottery	Composer
2014	The Michael J. Fox Show	Composer
2013	The Secret Lives of Dorks	Composer
2013	Finding Joy	Composer
2012	Guns, Girls and Gambling	Composer
2012	Time Machine Chefs	Composer
2011-2014	Wilfred	Composer
2010	Undercover Boss	Composer
2010	Open Season 3	Composer
2009-2015	The League	Composer
2009	The Vicious Kind	Composer
2008	Miss Guided	Composer
2007-2009	The Drinky Crow Show	Composer
2007	Firehouse Dog	Composer
2005	Just Friends	Composer
2005	30 Days	Composer
2005	Love for Rent	Composer
2004-2011	Entourage	Composer
2004-2007	Pimp My Ride	Composer
2004	House of Clues	Composer
2003	Where the Red Fern Grows	Composer
2003-2012	CSI: Miami	Composer
1995-2016	MADtv	Composer
