= Gaelan Connell =

American actor, director (b. 1989)

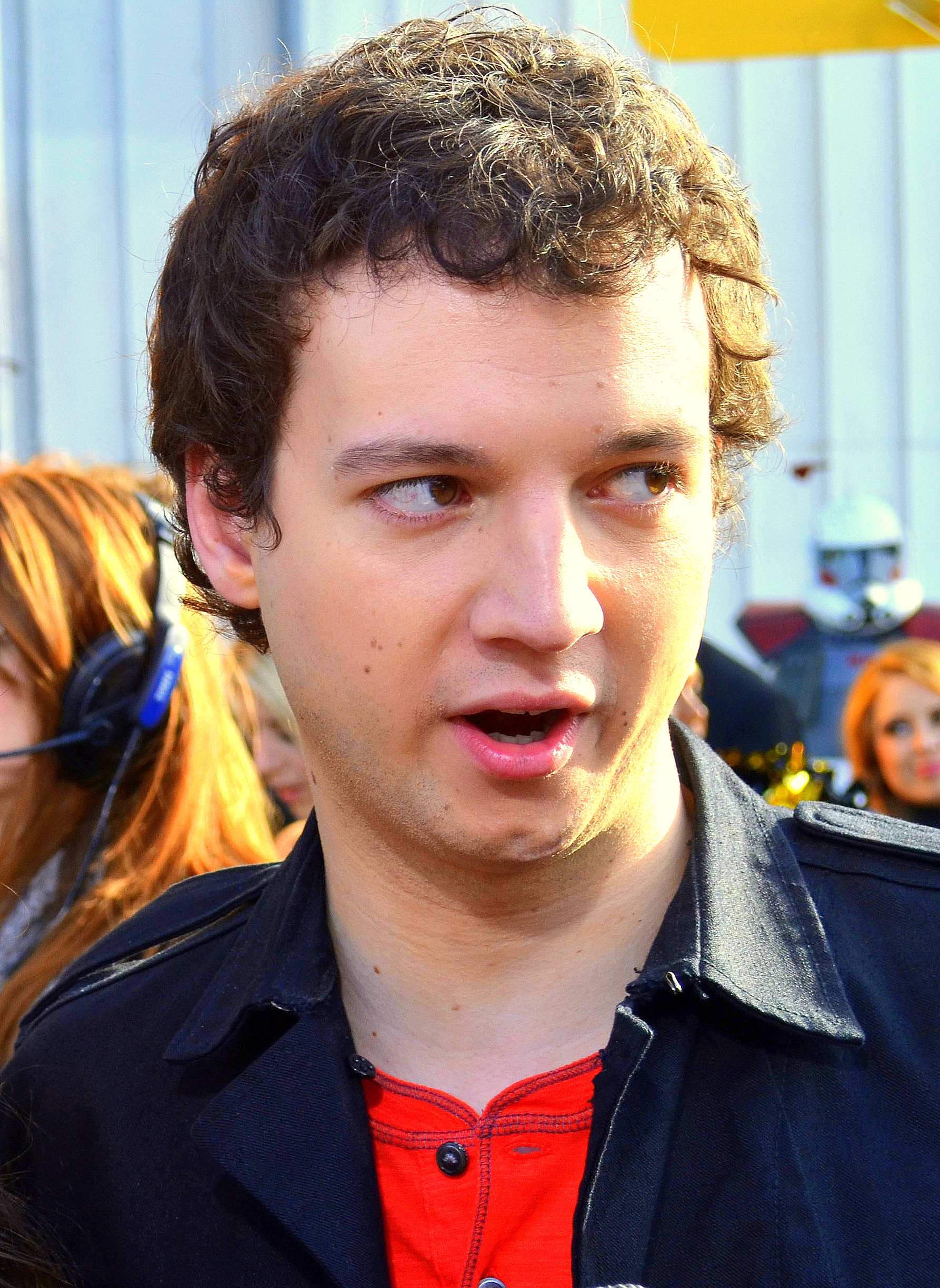
- Connell at the Hall of Game Awards 2012
- Born: Gaelan Alexander Connell; May 19, 1989 (age 37); Washington, D.C., U.S.
- Education: New York University
- Occupations: Actor, director
- Years active: 2000–present
- Spouse: Meryl Draper (m. 2018)
- Children: 1

Gaelan Alexander Draper (formerly Connell, born May 19, 1989) is an American actor and director.

== Early life and education ==
Connell was born in Washington, D.C., and raised in Silver Spring, Maryland. He has two brothers, Brendan and Shawn. He graduated from Bethesda-Chevy Chase High School and attended the New York University Tisch School of the Arts.

== Career ==
Connell appeared in 2000 in Chocolat as Didi Drou and in A Dirty Shame as "Horny Kid". He also guest starred in an episode of Law & Order. He played the lead role in Bandslam - a high school nerd who becomes popular after he manages a band and discovers he doesn't have to change himself to fit in. In an interview with The Washington Post, Connell stated that he drew on his personal experiences of being bullied by his older brothers to play the character of Will Burton,“this character I’m playing now in ‘Bandslam’ is a little too close to home, being awkward and nerdy.”

In 2011 he appeared as Wyatt Black in Cartoon Network's TV Movie Level Up.

In 2012, he was one of the founders of California Burrito, a quick-service restaurant chain in southern India.

In addition to acting, Connell is also a film director, having directed award-winning commercials for various brands as well as the independent feature film Blood, Sand and Gold, which was shot in six countries on a micro-budget. In a 2017 interview with Salon, actor Aaron Costa Ganis, discussed the risks and danger present on set. He described stunt performers working without crash pads and expressed concern that he thought a stuntman would die on set. Ganis also expressed frustration towards Connell for leaving out a sex scene with his co-star from the script, stating that he’s angry and has not forgiven Connell for the decision.

== Personal life ==
In 2018, Connell married Meryl Draper, co-founder and CEO of Quirk Creative. Following his marriage to Draper, Connell adopted his wife's surname.

== Filmography ==
=== Film ===
Year	Title	Role	Notes
2000	Chocolat	Didi Drou	
2004	A Dirty Shame	Horny Kid	
2007	Notes from the Rogues Gallery	Jared	
2009	Bandslam	Will	
2013	The Secret Lives of Dorks	Payton	

=== Television ===
Year	Title	Role	Notes
2008	Law & Order	Jackson	Episode: "Betrayal"
2011	Level Up	Wyatt Black	Television film
2012–2013	Level Up	Wyatt Black	31 episodes
