= Riley Voelkel =

American-born Canadian actress (born 1990)

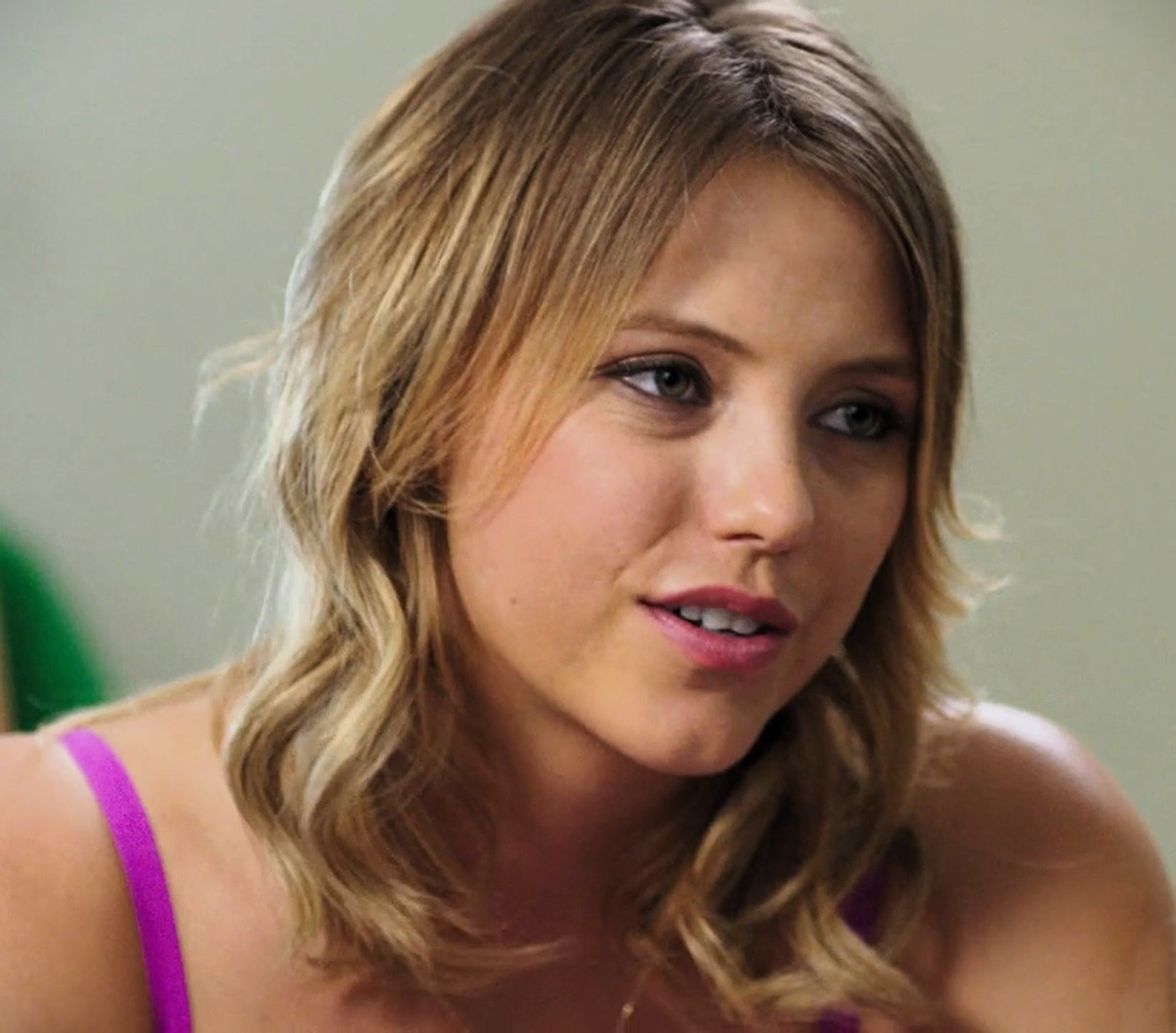
- Born: Riley Emilia Voelkel; April 26, 1990 (age 36); Elk Grove, California
- Occupation: Actress
- Years active: 2010–present
- Notable work: American Horror Story: Coven (2013); The Originals (2014–2018); Hightown (2020–2024)
- Spouse: Mike C. Robertson (m. 2022)
- Children: 1

Riley Emilia Voelkel (born April 26, 1990) is an American-born Canadian actress. She is known for portraying Freya Mikaelson on The CW television series The Originals and Legacies. Voelkel also played the role of Jenna Johnson on the HBO television series The Newsroom. In 2013, she played the younger version of Jessica Lange's character, the witch Fiona Goode in the FX series American Horror Story: Coven.

== Early life ==
Voelkel was born in Elk Grove, California but raised in Calgary, Alberta.

Just a month away from going to college, a modeling scout came to her town and she decided to try her luck. The scout picked her and she went to Los Angeles where she was very much liked by several agents. She moved to Los Angeles to model, but, soon after, she joined an acting class recommended by an agent.

== Career ==
Voelkel's first role was of a club girl in The Social Network, winning the part by audition. Afterwards, she signed with an agent, and booked her first starring role, as Carrie in the independent film, The Secret Lives of Dorks, released in 2013. In 2012, she joined the HBO series The Newsroom only for the pilot episode, but later became the character of Jenna. In 2014, she was cast as one of the leads in the Amazon pilot Point of Honor.

In the fall 2014, Voelkel was cast in an unnamed recurring role on The CW series The Originals during its second season. Her character on The Originals, Freya Mikaelson, was upgraded to a series regular for the show's third season.

== Personal life ==
Since 2022, Voelkel has been married to her longtime partner, photographer Mike C. Robertson. In September 2025, she announced the birth of her first child.

== Filmography ==
=== Film ===
Year	Title	Role	Notes
2010	The Social Network	Final Club Girl	Uncredited
2011	Prom	Claire	
2012	Hidden Moon	Christine Brighton	
2013	Synthesizers	Club Girl	Short film
2013	The Secret Lives of Dorks	Carrie Smith	
2016	Scrambled	Cristina	

=== Television ===
Year	Title	Role	Notes
2010	Glory Daze	Caroline	Episode: Pilot
2012	The Mentalist	Tristan	Episode: "Red is the New Black"
2012–14	The Newsroom	Jenna Johnson	Recurring, 15 episodes
2013	American Horror Story: Coven	Young Fiona Goode	3 episodes
2014	Glee	Sam	Episode: "New New York"
2014–2018	The Originals	Freya Mikaelson	Recurring role (season 2); Series regular (season 3–5); 60 episodes
2015	Point of Honor	Lorelei Sumner	Unsold television pilot
2016	Advance & Retreat	Alison Sinclair	TV movie
2019–2022	Roswell, New Mexico	Jenna Cameron	Recurring role
2019–2022	Legacies	Freya Mikaelson	Special guest star (3 episodes)
2020–2024	Hightown	Renee Segna	Series regular
2022	Chicago Med	Milena Jovanovic	Recurring role (season 7); Guest role (season 8); 9 episodes
