= Bruce Harris Craven =

American novelist

Bruce Craven
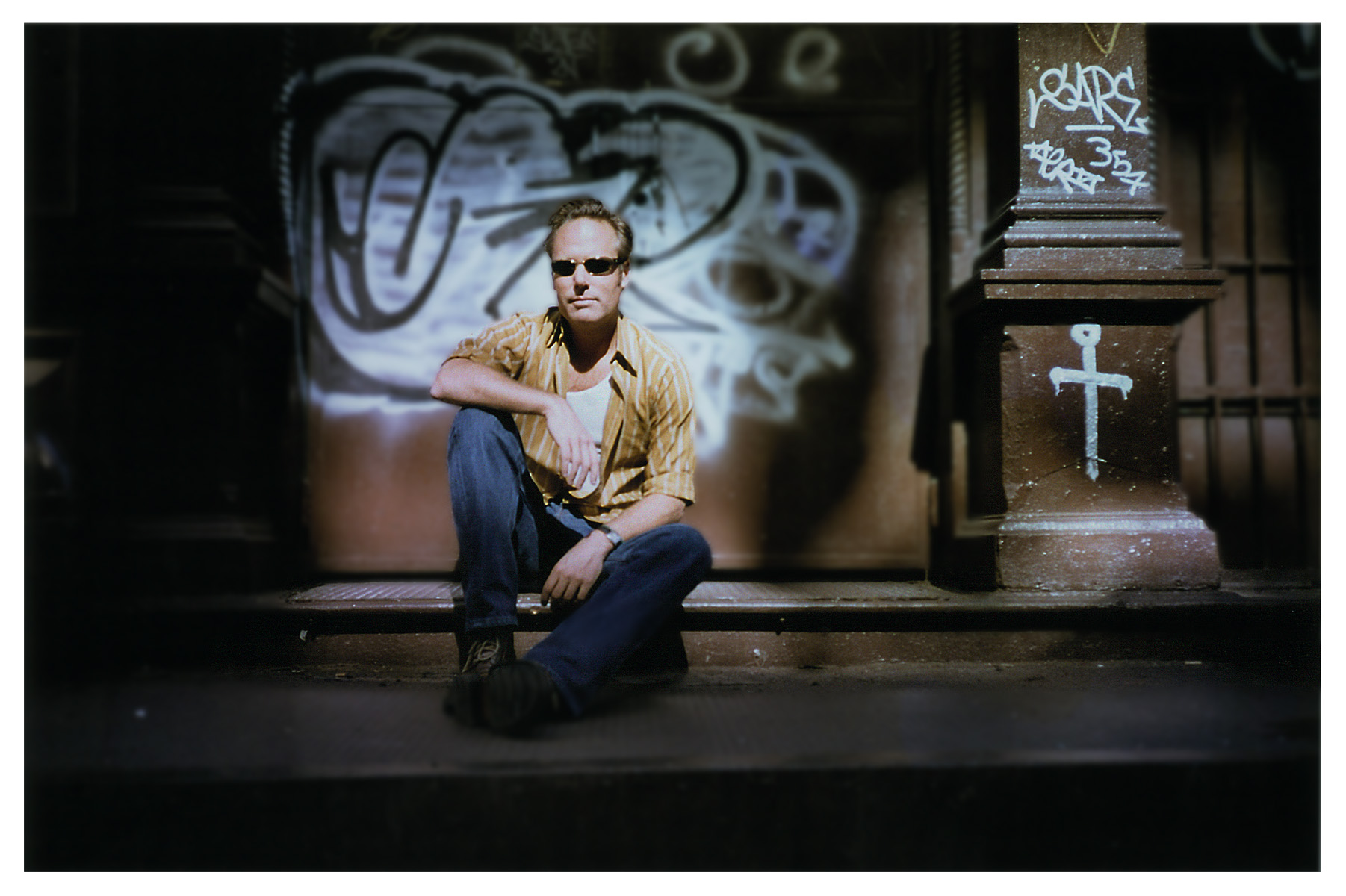
- Born: Bruce Harris Craven; October 15 1960; Burbank, California
- Education: University of California, Santa Cruz (B.A.); Columbia University (M.F.A.)
- Occupations: Educator; Novelist; Poet; Nonfiction writer; Screenwriter
- Writing career
- Period: First published book -- 1994 Most recent published book -- 2021
- Notable works: Win or Die: Leadership Secrets from Game of Thrones; Fast Sofa (Novel & Screenplay)
- Website: https://cravenleadership.com/

Bruce Craven is an American novelist, poet, non-fiction writer and screenwriter. He works as a management teacher, advisor and faculty director in the field of leadership development.

== Education ==
Craven received a B.A. in politics and literature from the University of California, Santa Cruz and an M.F.A. in poetry from Columbia University.

== Education work ==
Craven is Academic Director and Adjunct Associate Professor at Columbia Business School. His work focuses in leadership. He teaches and runs leadership programs with business leaders from public and private companies around the world. He also teaches the MBA course: Leadership Through Fiction, a management course based on novels, plays, films, shows and poetry.

== Published works ==
Craven published Win or Die: Leadership Secrets from Game of Thrones (2019, St. Martin's Press, reprinted by 2023, (Codhill Press). He also published the novel Sweet Ride (2021, Codhill Press) and the poetry collection Buena Suerte in Red Glitter (2019, Red Dirt Press)

Craven wrote the novel Fast Sofa (1993, William Morrow and Company) and later co-wrote the screenplay for the movie of the same name (2001, Lionsgate Studios) The movie starred Jake Busey, Jennifer Tilly, Crispin Glover, Natasha Lyonne, Adam Goldberg and Eric Roberts. The punk band Fear (band) appear in the film. The novel included a flexidisc with music from the punk band The Flesh Eaters.

== Sources ==
- Exploring Media Culture: A Guide
- Columbia Business School Directory : Detail : Bruce+Craven
- The New York Times Movies
