= Triangle Sun =

Russian pop/downtempo band

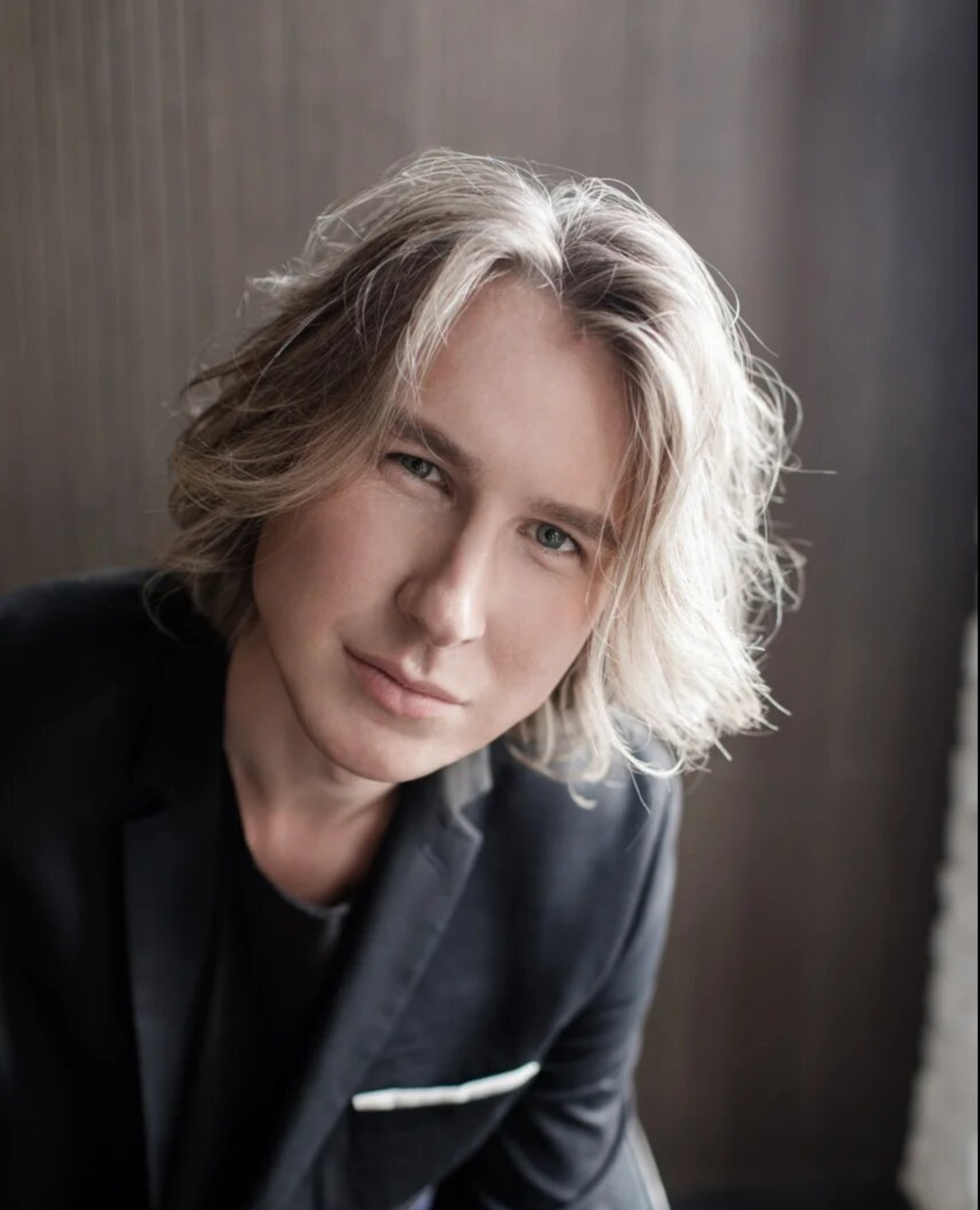

Background information
- Origin: Moscow, Russia
- Genres: electronic music, lounge, downtempo, chillout, pop, indie
- Years active: 2004–present
- Label: TSM
- Members: Alexander Knyazev
- Website: www.trianglesun.com

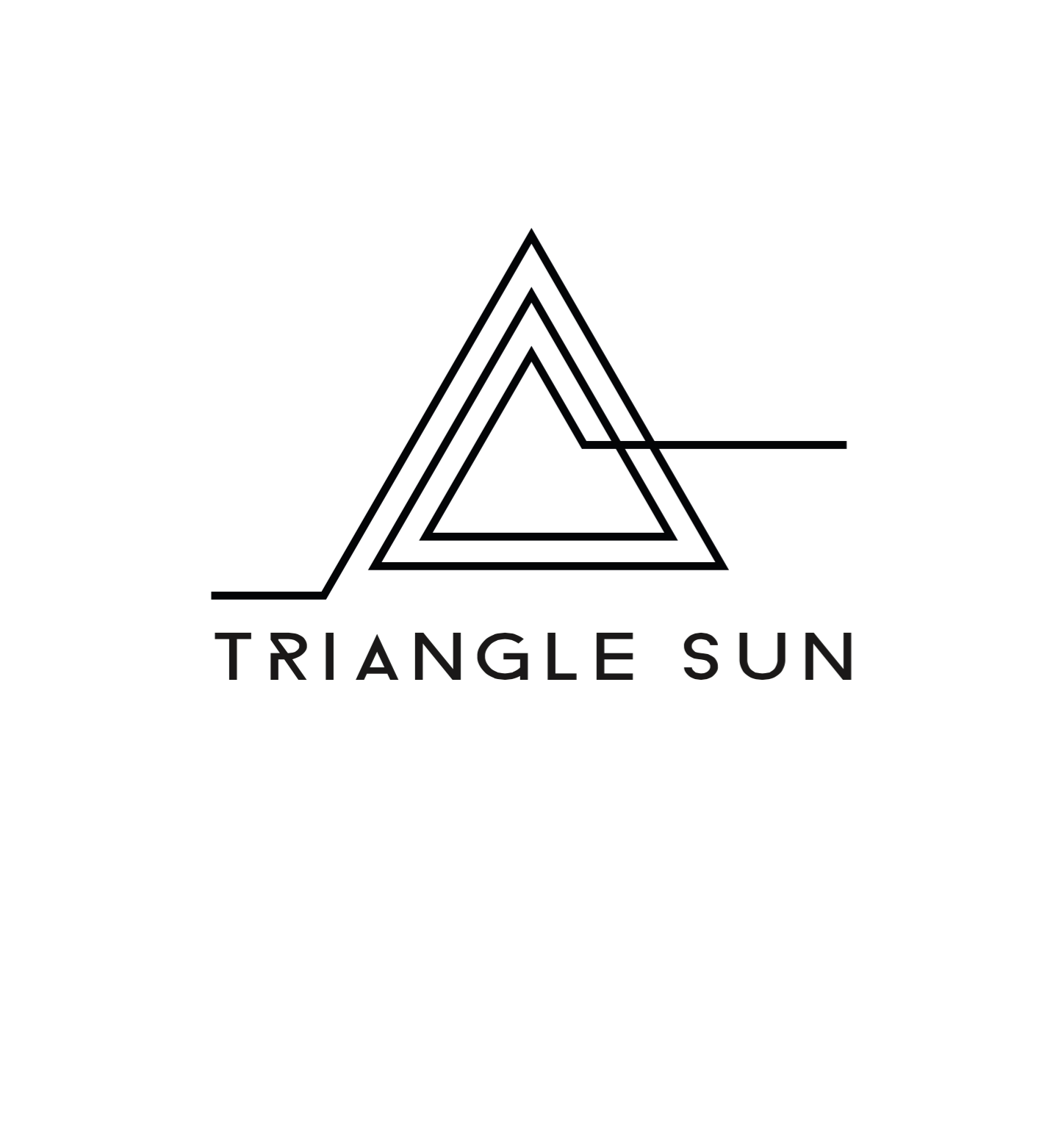
The band's logo.

Triangle Sun is an international electronic band, created in 2004 by Russian composer Alexander Knyazev and based in Los Angeles.

The compositions of the project are included in the world music collections Café del Mar, Buddha Bar, Mykonos 2019 and more than two dozen collections. Triangle Sun songs are rotated in 53 countries.

== History ==
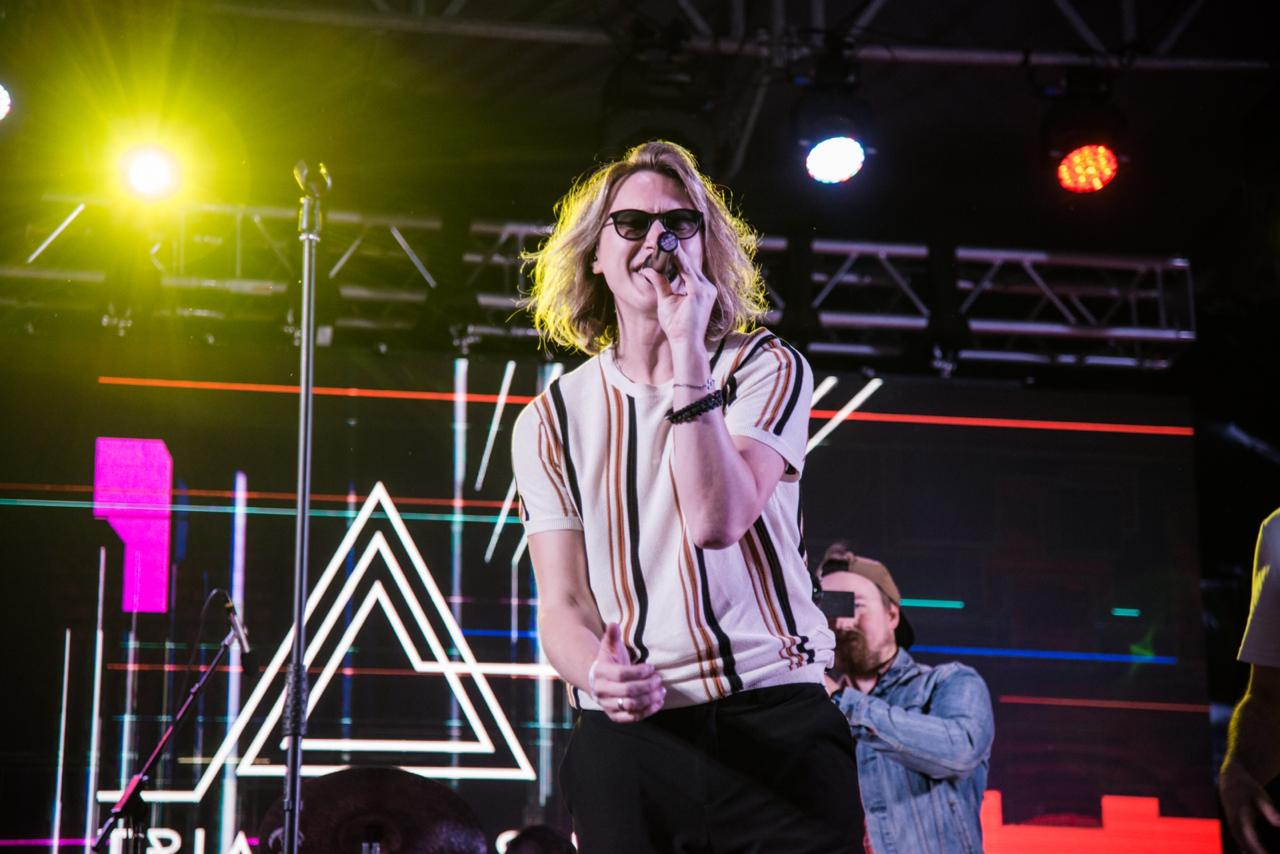

In 2004 Triangle Sun began the ascension on a musical scene. Same year they have won the Russian festival Cafe Del Mar Lounge. Then went to Spanish coast of Ibiza to play in world famous Cafe Del Mar (Ibiza) and won there too. Soon the track Beautiful was licensed by Cafe Del Mar XIII, thanks to which Triangle Sun has become popular in Europe and America.

As a result, in summer 2005, Triangle Sun performed as headliner at festival Parliament Lounge.

Thus, Triangle Sun became a project included in the series of compilations Cafe del Mar, and then a project that performed at the festival Global Gathering 2007 in London.

The debut album of Triangle Sun under the name Diamond was released in September 2007 on Diamond Records.

In 2009 Alexander Knyazev have found their own musical label TSM.

In 2010 Mars licensed a track by Triangle Sun founder Alexander Knyazev, called "Moments" as a soundtrack for the TVC of chocolate Dove on the American market.

Same year managers of German division Sony music have included their composition "Diamond" in 9th vol. of Erotic lounge, among such musical collectives as Air, Tosca, Thievery Corporation, Kruder and Dorfmeister, Jazzanova, Yonderboi, Blank&Jones, Groove Armada and many other well-known masters of international downtempo scene which figured throughout previous issues. The release took place in October 2010.

In 2011 French label, Wagram has included a composition "When you go forward" to the 13th volume of Buddha Bar compilation series.

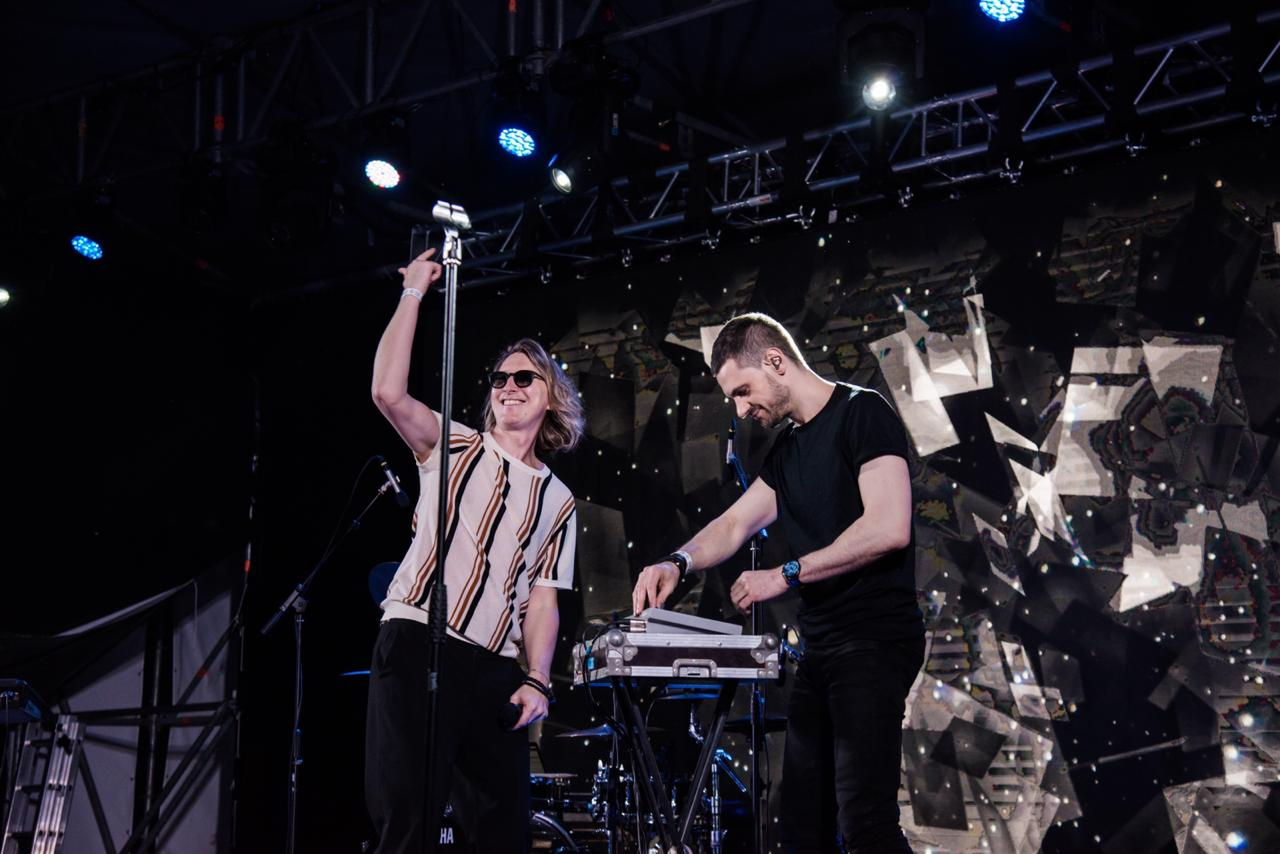

Since 2011, Triangle Sun has been in MTV's global rotation. Also the project rotated on VH1 in Brazil, VIVA TV in Germany and Poland.

In 2013, the project received the club's Golden Gargoyle award in the category "Best electronic project of the year".

In 2015, the band members were invited to Sochi to perform in the cultural and entertainment part of the Formula 1 Russia Grand Prix.

In 2016, Triangle Sun became a headliner at the largest fashion events of the year in Russia — "Vogue Fashion's Night Out 2016" and "SNC NET DAY 2016".

In 2017, Triangle Sun headlined GQ's "100 most stylish" and Maxim magazine's "100 sexiest women in Russia" event.

In 2018, the project became the headliner of ELLE magazine's event in Russia.

== Members ==
- Alexander Knyazev (founder of the project) — vocal, composer, programming. He was born in Moscow, 21 April 1984. Lives in Los Angeles. Permanent member of the jury of the Russian National Music Award. The author of the music of the main video of the opening ceremony of the Winter Olympic Games in 2014 in Sochi. Host on the radio Relax FM his author's program Relax Single. The author of the music of the world exhibition Expo 2017 in Astana. Composer of the opening ceremony of the historical stage of the Bolshoi theatre of Russia. In parallel writes music for television shows (TEFI, The King of the Ring) and commercials (Beeline, Dove, Philips, Panasonic, OBI, Samsung etc.).
- Pavel Kovan — drummer.

== Discography ==
=== Studio albums ===
Year of release	Title	Label	Country
2007	Diamond	Diamond Records	Russia
2010	Iris	World Club Music	Russia
2011	Diamond / Iris	Tyranno	Germany
2014	Born in the Silence	TSM	Russia
2015	EP «YOUR little CLOWN»	TSM	Russia
2016	The Red Line	TSM	Russia
2016	CRAVE	TSM	Russia
2016	Hidden Home	TSM	Russia
2016	My Magic Book	TSM	Russia
2017	How Can I	TSM	Russia
2019	In My Head	TSM	Russia
2019	No One	TSM	Russia

=== Compilations ===
Year of release	Compilation	Label	Country
2005	Good Karma. Volume 2	Langues	Russia
2006	Cafe del Mar vol. 13	Cafe del Mar Music	Spain
2006	Light seasons 05	Langues	Russia
2007	Relax Volume 3	S.B.A./GALA Records	Russia
2007	Stavedo II	The Sound Of Everything	Greece
2008	Klassik Lounge Werk 7	High Music	Germany
2008	Wavemusic vol. 11	Wave Music	Germany
2009	Klassik Lounge Summer	High Music	Germany
2009	Relax Volume 7	S.B.A./GALA Records	Russia
2010	Huvafen Fushi Maldives by Ravin	Avril	Thailand
2010	Chillout after midnight	Magic Records/Warner Music Group	Poland
2010	Diamonds & Pearls vol.4	Tyranno Records	Germany
2010	Dubaï Eklektic	Avril	Thailand
2010	Erotic Lounge 9	Sony Music	Germany
2011	Bar Lounge Classic 2	Sony Music	Germany
2011	Buddha Bar vol. 13	Wagram / George V Records	France
2011	Luxury Session Ibiza	Daredo	Germany
2011	Ibiza Chillout Paradise	Sony Music	Germany
2011	A Night @ Buddha-Bar Hotel	Wagram / George V Records	France
2012	Public chill	Wave Music	Germany
2012	Siddharta, Spirit of Buddha-Bar Vol. 6	Wagram / George V Records	France

== Awards ==
- 2013 — Golden Gargoyle — "Best electronic project of the year".

== Festivals ==
- 2015 — Bosco Fresh Festival;
- 2015 — Wake Weekend;
- 2015 — VK Fest;
- 2017 — Alfa Future People;
- 2019 — Super MEGA Fest.

== Soundtracks ==
In 2006, a film Slide was released, directed by Anna Kelchevskaya, where the composition "Buddha" was chosen to be the main musical theme.

In 2012, song "When you go forward" has been licensed for the feature film Everything is simple directed by Sonia Karpunina.

In 2016, song "When you go forward" has been licensed for the feature film Box directed by Eduard Bordukov.

In 2018, the composition "Buddha" was licensed by a film Studio in Los Angeles, which released the film Ray Meets Helen and made this composition the soundtrack to the film.

== Music videos ==
Triangle Sun shot 2 music videos on singles from both albums. In 2011 both albums entered a global MTV and now are on air in such regions as:

- United Kingdom;
- Germany;
- France;
- Netherlands;
- Belgium;
- Denmark;
- Sweden;
- Hungary;
- Poland;
- Israel;
- South Africa;
- Brazil;
- Australia;
- South Korea.

Both of the videos are also being rotated on VH1 in Brazil, VIVA TV in Germany and Poland, A-One, Music Box, BRIDGE TV in Russia, M1 in Ukraine.

=== Videography ===
Release: 15 January 2010 Beautiful

Director: Roman Jirnih
DOP: Marat Adelshin
Producer: Anton Kirillov
Cut: Ivan Gaev
Color grading Salamandra

Where will you go

Release: 19 September 2010

Director: Charley Stadler (DE)
DOP: Charley Stadler (DE)
Producer: Anton Kirillov
Cut: Cutting Edge (GB)
Color grading: Scanwerk (DE)

== Remixes ==
Beautiful

- 2007 — BarBQ;
- 2010 — Wamdue project;
- 2010 — Santerna

Label: SongBird, Netherlands.

Upside Down

- 2014 — Betoko & Jose Maria Ramon;

Your little Clown

- 2015 — Sasha Knyazev;

The Red Line

- 2016 — Sasha Knyazev.

== Rotations ==
Triangle Sun tracks are rotated on more than 100 Russian and European radio stations, such as Radio Record, Relax FM, Radio Jazz, Silver Rain Radio, Radio Mayak, Radio Maximum, Hit FM, Ibiza Sonica (Spain), Klassik Radio (Germany), Lounge FM (Austria), Radionotte (Italy) and others.
