= Steven J. Wolfe =

American film producer

- Born: United States
- Occupation: Film producer
- Notable work: Twin Falls Idaho

Steven J. Wolfe is an American film producer. He is a producing partner and owner of Sneak Preview Entertainment, a Hollywood film production and talent management company. He founded the company in 1993 with Lynette Prucha Chavez, where he continues to develop independent film projects.

Wolfe is perhaps best known for his film Twin Falls Idaho, which was acquired by Sony Pictures Classics at its world premiere at the 1999 Sundance Film Festival. The debut feature film of the Polish brothers, it is the story of a young woman who finds herself with feelings for one of two adult conjoined twins. Twin Falls Idaho won the Special Jury Prize at the Deauville Film Festival and was nominated for two Film Independent Spirit Awards, including Best First Film over $500,000.

== Filmography ==
Year	Title	Role	Notes
1987	Hunk	associate producer	
1988	Deathrow Gameshow	supervising producer	
1989	Night Club	supervising producer	
1989	My Mom's a Werewolf	producer	
1991	Scorchers	producer	
1992	I Only You	co-producer	
1994	Tollbooth	producer	
1995	Bird of Prey	executive producer	
1998	Relax...It's Just Sex	producer	
1999	Twin Falls Idaho	producer	
1999	Clean and Narrow	co-producer	
2001	Fast Sofa	producer	
2001	Circuit	producer	
2004	Hellbent	producer	
2005	When Do We Eat?	producer	
2005	The Civilization of Maxwell Bright	producer	
2006	Phat Girlz	producer	
2007	A Dennis the Menace Christmas	producer	
2008	Beautiful Loser	executive producer, producer	
2009	500 Days of Summer	producer	
2009	Miss March	producer	
2010	Our Family Wedding	producer	
2012	What My Husband Doesn't Know	associate producer	
2013	The Secret Lives of Dorks	producer	
2013	Baggage Claim	producer	
2017	Ray Meets Helen	producer	
2019	Everything But a Man	producer	
2019	Sallywood	producer	
2019–2020	Landed	producer	TV series
2020	Fatherland	producer	
2020	Valley Girl	producer	
