= Communicate (Sasha & John Digweed album) =

Remix album by Sasha & John Digweed
- Released: 26 June 2000
- Recorded: 1999
- Genre: Progressive house
- Length: 148:00
- Labels: INCredible, Kinetic Records
- Producers: Sasha; John Digweed

Sasha & John Digweed chronology
Northern Exposure: Expeditions (1999)	Communicate (2000)	Sasha & John Digweed present Delta Heavy (2005)

Sasha chronology
Global Underground: Ibiza (1999)	Communicate (2000)	Airdrawndagger (2002)

John Digweed chronology
Global Underground: Hong Kong (1999)	Communicate (2000)	Global Underground: Los Angeles (2002)

Communicate is the fifth mix album by British DJ duo Sasha & John Digweed. It is the first since 1994 to not be part of the Northern Exposure concept album series.

== Critical reception ==
Professional ratings
Aggregate scores
Source	Rating
Metacritic	53/100
Review scores
Source	Rating
Allmusic	3/5 stars
Pitchfork	4/10

Communicate was met with "mixed or average" reviews from critics. At Metacritic, which assigns a weighted average rating out of 100 to reviews from mainstream publications, this release received an average score of 53 based on 7 reviews.

In a review for AllMusic, Jason Birchmeier wrote: "Communicate can be seen as the duo's best mix CD to date with its striking consistency at all levels, ranging from track selection to mixing to mood to tempo. Rather than moving through a broad palette of sounds, moods, tempos, and styles, the two British DJs choose to remain consistent. At Exclaim!, Venk Chanran wrote: "Communicate may not be as challenging and as boundary pushing as the earlier albums, but it still pleases the ear. The second disc is a lot harder, pushing rhythms and layering melodies over each other with technical precision.

== Track listing ==
Disc One
No.	Title	Length
1.	"Like A Bitch" (feature Jaimy and Kenny D)	8:23
2.	"Get Lost" (featuring Eric Clapton) (David Morales remix)	5:56
3.	"True" (featuring Morel) (16B Remix)	6:47
4.	"Roaches" (featuring Trancesetters) (Peace Division Remix)	9:38
5.	"Voices" (featuring Bedrock (Slacker's Dumbstruck Mix)	4:25
6.	"Fusion" (featuring Slacker)	5:57
7.	"Pushing Too Hard" (featuring Saints & Sinners)	5:56
8.	"Musak" (featuring Trisco) (Wonderland Avenue Remix)	5:16
9.	"West On 27th" (featuring Killahurtz) (A Tribe Called KHz Mix)	10:39
10.	"Tyrantanic" (featuring Breeder) (Slacker's Kingdom Come Mix)	3:09
11.	"The Baguio Track" (featuring Luzon) (Digweed & Muir's Bedrock Mix)	4:52

- The US version features the track Sven Väth - "Barbarella (Deep Dish Mix)" in place of track 3

Disc Two
No.	Title	Length
1.	"Narcotic" (featuring Mainline)	8:13
2.	"The Blue Hour" (featuring Killer Loop)	7:15
3.	"Lifestyles (Part 2)" (featuring King Of Spin)	4:43
4.	"Voices" (featuring Bedrock) (Freelance Icebreaker's Mix)	5:19
5.	"Once More" (featuring The Orb) (Bedrock Dub Mix)	6:03
6.	"ECI-PS" (featuring Jimmy Van M)	7:16
7.	"Waah!" (featuring P.O.B.) (Seismix)	6:03
8.	"Force 51" (featuring Austin Leeds)	7:16
9.	"Ruhe" (featuring Schiller) (Humate Mix)	8:15
10.	"Put Your Earphones On" (featuring Proper Filthy Naughty)	6:45
11.	"Enjoyed" (featuring The Chemical Brothers)	6:52
