= Morgan King =

English musician (born 1961)

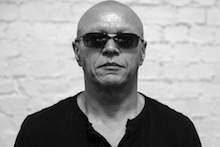

Background information
- Born: 28 March 1961 (age 65)
- Origin: Spitalfields, London, England
- Genres: Electronic, synth-pop, ambient, alternative, house
- Occupations: Musician, songwriter, producer, photographer
- Instruments: Vocals, drums, bass, synthesizer, drum machine
- Years active: 1979–present
- Label: Accidental Music
- Website: Morganking.net

Morgan King (born 28 March 1961) is an English singer, songwriter, record producer and photographer.

== Musical career ==
Born in Spitalfields, London, King's musical career began in 1979 as drummer for Manchester band Illustration, who were subsequently signed by the indie label, "Some Bizzare" featuring on the Some Bizzare Album. After several years immersed in the UK indie scene, King's musical direction changed considerably with the advent of house music in the late 1980s. In 1988, King moved to Chicago and started writing with Kym Mazelle and Marshall Jefferson on Mazelle's first album, Crazy, which was released the following year. In 1989, King joined his third band, the Manic MCs who had a UK top thirty hit with their first release, "Mental".

In 1990, King started collaborating with BTech record's Jan Ekholm after being introduced by DJ/production duo Quartz, working in Sweden on a series of dance releases under various pseudonyms, including Technoir, Backbeat, Groovement, Bassrace and others. "Clubland" originally formed by Dave Rawlings and Ronnie Herel of Quartz with Jan Ekholm. During the first album Quartz left and the two remaining members were joined by Zemya Hamilton on vocals. Clubland recorded three albums, winning a Swedish Grammy for their second album Adventures Beyond Clubland, plus received three gold discs. Together they also topped the US Billboard Dance chart three times with "Lets Get Busy", "Hold On (Tighter to Love)" and "Hypnotized" respectively. It was also during this period he recorded his solo record, the Balearic anthem "I Am Free".

In 1991, King partnered with Nick Hook to form Om records in London and the band Soundsource, The duo released the house and rap track "Take Me Up", later recycled by "Lock 'N Load" for their 2000 top ten UK hit "Blow Ya Mind". This single was followed up by the 1992 club hit "One High". Again, King started writing and recording under a variety of pseudonyms at Om including, Al Hambra, VFN Experience, Om and Obiman. Obiman went on to feature on the seminal Cafe Del Mar compilation series. On the same album he also co-wrote and produced José Padilla's first solo recording "Agua".

Around 1994/1995, King took a break from the music scene, eventually resurfacing in 2003 to co-write Trybe's "Sarah Said" with Fragma. In 2007 he opened his Accidental Music label so he could make his archive available in the digital realm for the first time, and to collaborate on new dance projects. Also around the same time he became a professional photographer after he was invited to do a one off project in Iran. To date he is still working as an artist releasing solo albums and playing live, plus since 2012 he joined Lene Lovich as part of her band.

== Selected discography ==
=== Morgan King ===
Albums

- Grains & Grams (2016), Accidental Music
- Old Skin (2019), Accidental Music

Singles and EPs

- "I'm Free" (1991), BTech Records
- "I am Free" (1993), Om Records
- "I'm Free" (1998), Excession Records
- "I'm Free" (Anniversary Edition) (2011), Accidental Music
- "I'm Free" (Anniversary Edition 2) (2012), Accidental Music
- "Boy Called George" (2012), Morgan King Media
- Zero (EP) (2012), Morgan King Media
- "Breathing in Air" (2014), Accidental Music
- "Grains & Grams" (2016), Accidental Music
- "Alien" (2016), Accidental Music
- "Sex Shop" (2018), Accidental Music
- "Janet & John" (2018), Accidental Music
- "From The Fade" (2021), Accidental Music
- "Beautiful Miserable" (2021), Accidental Music
- "The Snow in Moonlight" (2025), Accidental Music
- "Love Tsunami" (2025), Accidental Music
- "Bring me Flowers" (2025), Accidental Music
- "She Came From The Dead" (2026), Accidental Music

=== Morgan King & Lene Lovich ===
Singles

- "Retrospective" – 2018 Accidental Music

=== Morgan King / La Serrena ===
Singles

- "I'm Free" – 1992 Sony

=== With Clubland ===
(King / Ekholm / Hamilton)

Albums

- Themes From Outer Clubland – 1991
- Adventures Beyond Clubland – 1992
- Secrets of Inner Clubland (Clubland featuring Zemya Hamilton) – 1995

Selected singles

- "Let's Get Busy (Pump It Up)" – 1990 US Hot Dance No. 1 UK No. 86
- "Hold On (Tighter To Love)" – 1991 US Billboard "Hot Dance" No. 1, US No. 79
- "(I'm Under) Love Strain" – 1992
- "Come Rain Come Shine" – US Hot Dance No. 39 1992
- "Hypnotized" – 1992 US Hot Dance No. 1
- "Set Me Free" – 1992 US Hot Dance No. 1, US No. 90
- "Peace of Luv" – 1995
- "Gimme Love, Gimme All" – 1995

=== With Manic MC's ===
(King / Cottle / Hudd)

Singles

- "Mental" – 1989 RCA UK No. 30
- "The Beat" – 1990 UK No. 96 MCA

=== With Soundsource ===
(King / Hook)

Singles

- "Take Me Up" – 1991 FFRR UK No. 62
- "One High" – 1992 Om records

=== Obiman ===
Singles

- "Rising" – Om Records 1993
- "On the Rocks" – Accidental Music 2016
- "The Dunes" – Accidental Music 2016
- "Life Without Pavements" – Accidental Music 2024
- "Agua" – Cafe Del Mar 2026
- "View From The Lighthouse" – Accidental Music 2026
- "The Other Side Of The Lighthouse" – Accidental Music 2026

Compilations

- "On the Rocks" – Included on Cafe Del Mar Vol 1 album React Records 1994

=== With VFN Experience ===
(Nasty / King)

Single

- "Vol 1" – Om whites 1994

=== Morgan King & Max Julien ===
Singles

- "Lifetime of Understanding" – 2009 Deepsound Records
- "Building A Dream" – 2011 Accidental Music

=== Morgan King vs Charma ===
Singles

- "Justify" – 2010 Accidental Music
- "Justify" (Dirty Rhythm Syndicate Remixes) – 2011 Accidental Music

=== Morgan King vs Lyla D'Souza ===
Singles

- "I Want Now" – 2010 Accidental Music

=== Remixes ===
- Backbeat – "Love and Happiness" (Gasmatron mix) 1991
- Clubland – "Ride the Groove" (With Billy Nasty) 1992
- Clubland – "Hypnotized" (The Soundsource Seduction) 1992
- Alhambra – "Sonar Remix" (with Nick Hook) 1992
- MDA – "Take an E" (Roofon remix) (with Nasty / Hodgson) 1992
- Hypernature – Flow "The Morgan King mixes" (King Full Force Effect, Kingdub and Kingdeep mixes)1992
- Elimar – "Prosody II" (Morgan King Reprise) 2007
- Sami Dee – "Da Fly" (Morgan King Remix) 2008
- Max Julien feat Yohan Knight – "We're the Angels Alive!" (Morgan King Remix) 2008
- Marco Zappala feat Claudio Pinhero – "Wherever You Go" (Morgan King Remix) 2009
- Clubland – "Let's Get Busy" (Morgan King Remix) 2009

=== Compilation appearances ===
- Some Bizzare Album - 1981 (Illustration - Tidal Flow) Some Bizzare Records
- Trance 3 – 1993 (Morgan King – I Am Free – Soma Mix) Rumour Records
- Cafe Del Mar – Cafe Del Mar Vol 1 – 1994 (Obiman – "On the Rocks", Co-Written and produced Jose Padilla's "Agua") – React Records
- Sound of the Absolute – 1994 (I Am Free – Soma Mix, Soundsource – One High – Bump Mix, Alhambra – Alhambra – Otama Mix, I Am Free – Leftfield Escape From Da Da Mix, Obiman – Rising – Rosi Ryder Mix, Om – Older Brother From the Rock)
- Northern Exposure – Sasha and Digweed – 1996 (I'm Free – The Full Length La Serrena Mix and Playdo's Minimalist Mix) Ministry of Sound / Ultra Records
- Renaissance Worldwide – Singapore 1997 I'm Free (William Orbit Mix) – Renaissance
- Sasha – Global Underground #009: San Francisco" – 1998 (I'm Free – William Orbit Mix) Boxed
- GU Mixed – 2007 Sound Source "One High" Global Underground
- Snapshot (The Singles) – 2008 Accidental Music
- Cafe Mambo – 2008 "I'm Free" compiled by Andy Cato, Defected Records
- 90's House – 2010 – Accidental Music
- Cafe Del Mar Essentials – 2019 (Obiman – "On the Rocks").
- The Tears of Technology - 2020 (Illustration - Tidal Flow) - Ace Records
- Cafe Del Mar 40th Anniversary – 2020 (Morgan King – "I'm Free").
- Cafe Del Mar - Volume 30 - 2024 (Obiman – "On the Rocks" Sunset Diorama Remix).
