= List of awards and nominations received by Sasha =

Sasha awards and nominations
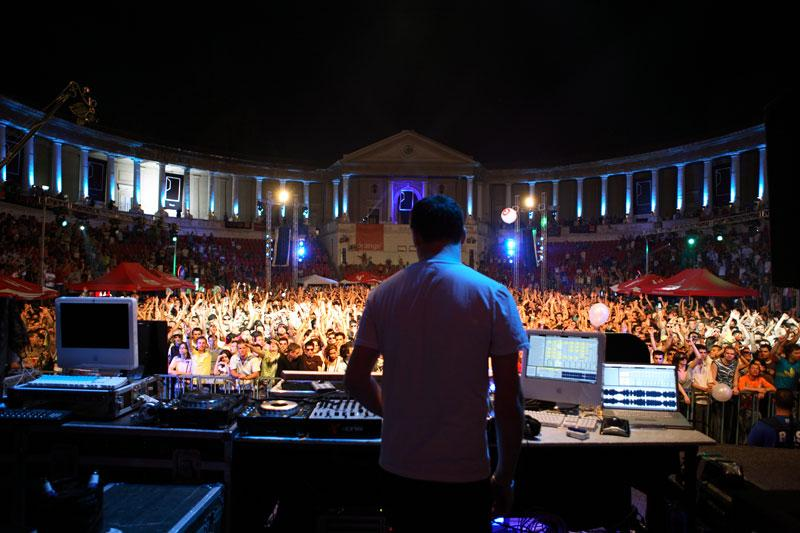
- Sasha performing in 2006
Awards and nominations
| Award | Wins | Nominations |
| Grammy | 0 | 1 |
| DJ Awards | 4 | 11 |
| DJ Magazine Awards | 1 | 11 |
| International Dance Music Awards | 4 | 6 |
| Musik Awards | 2 | 0 |
| Electronic Music Awards | 1 | 2 |

Totals (Note: Certain award groups do not simply award one winner. They acknowledge several different recipients, have runners-up, and have third place. Since this is a specific recognition and is different from losing an award, runner-up mentions are considered wins in this award tally. For simplification and to avoid errors, each award in this list has been presumed to have had a prior nomination.)
- Wins: 12
- Nominations: 31

The following is a list of awards and nominations received by Sasha, a Welsh DJ and record producer.

== DJ Awards ==
The DJ Awards organises the annual electronic music DJ awards event it is the only international ceremony for DJs and also the oldest, the awards are held once a year at Pacha club in Ibiza Spain it is one of the most important accolades an artist can win or be honoured by.

Sasha has won the Best Progressive House DJ Award 3 times, Best Tech House/Progressive DJ Award1 time and received 11 nominations overall.

Selected awards
| Year | Award | Nominated work | Category | Result |
|---|---|---|---|---|
| 2000 | DJ Awards | Sasha | Best Trance DJ | Nominated |
| 2002 | DJ Awards | Sasha | Best Progressive House DJ | Nominated |
| 2003 | DJ Awards | Sasha | Best Techouse/Progressive DJ | Nominated |
| 2004 | DJ Awards | Sasha | Best Techouse/Progressive DJ | Nominated |
| 2005 | DJ Awards | Sasha | Best Techouse/Progressive DJ | Won |
| 2006 | DJ Awards | Sasha | Best Techouse/Progressive DJ | Nominated |
| 2007 | DJ Awards | Sasha | Best Techouse/Progressive DJ | Nominated |
| 2008 | DJ Awards | Sasha | Best Progressive House DJ | Won |
| 2009 | DJ Awards | Sasha | Best Progressive House DJ | Won |
| 2010 | DJ Awards | Sasha | Best Progressive House DJ | Won |
| 2013 | DJ Awards | Sasha | Best Tech House DJ | Nominated |

== DJ Magazine Awards ==
Artists are nominated to the DJ Magazine Top 100 DJ's list each year the public votes to decide who they rank as the World's No 1 DJ at the end of the poll.

Sasha achieved the World's No 1 ranking DJ in 2000 and he stayed in the top 5 for 8 consecutive years, the top 10 for 11 consecutive years.

| Year | Nominee/work | Award | Result | Ref. |
|---|---|---|---|---|
| 1997 | Sasha | World's Top 100 DJs | 3 | |
| 1998 | Sasha | World's Top 100 DJs | 5 | |
| 1999 | Sasha | World's Top 100 DJs | 3 | |
| 2000 | Sasha | World's Top 100 DJs | 1 | |
| 2001 | Sasha | World's Top 100 DJs | 2 | |
| 2002 | Sasha | World's Top 100 DJs | 2 | |
| 2003 | Sasha | World's Top 100 DJs | 4 | |
| 2004 | Sasha | World's Top 100 DJs | 4 | |
| 2005 | Sasha | World's Top 100 DJs | 4 | |
| 2006 | Sasha | World's Top 100 DJs | 7 | |
| 2007 | Sasha | World's Top 100 DJs | 5 | |
| 2008 | Sasha | World's Top 100 DJs | 7 | |
| 2009 | Sasha | World's Top 100 DJs | 13 | |
| 2010 | Sasha | World's Top 100 DJs | 27 | |
| 2011 | Sasha | World's Top 100 DJs | 63 | |

== Electronic Music Awards ==
Sasha has won one award at the Electronic Music Awards.

| Year | Category | Nominated Artist/Work | Result |
|---|---|---|---|
| 2017 | Record of the Year | Rufus Du Sol - "Innerbloom" (Sasha Remix) | Won |
| 2017 | Remix of the Year | Rufus Du Sol - "Innerbloom" (Sasha Remix) | Nominated |
| 2017 | Producer of the Year | Sasha | Nominated |

== Grammy Awards ==
In 2005, the Grammy committee debated whether Sasha's mix compilation album, Involver, was eligible for nomination as Best Electronic/Dance Album. The Recording Academy decided that the album was eligible, but Involver did not receive a nomination. Sasha did receive a Grammy nomination for his remix of Felix da Housecat's "Watching Cars Go By", which was featured on Involver.

| Year | Nominated work | Category | Result |
|---|---|---|---|
| 2005 | Felix da Housecat's "Watching Cars Go By" | Best Remixed Recording, Non-Classical | Nominated |

== International Dance Music Awards ==
At the annual Winter Music Conference, Sasha has won the "Best Techno/Trance 12" award (1999) for the Xpander EP, and "Best CD Compilation" awards for Global Underground: Ibiza (1999, 2000) and Involver (2004). He was also nominated in the categories "Best European DJ" (2004) and "Best Remixer".

Sasha has achieved 4 wins from 10 nominations overall.

Selected awards
| Year | Award | Nominated work | Category | Result |
|---|---|---|---|---|
| 1999 | IDMA | Xpander | Best Techno/Trance 12" | Won |
| 2000 | IDMA | Global Underground: Ibiza | Best CD Compilation | Won |
| 2001 | IDMA | Global Underground: Ibiza | Best CD Compilation | Won |
| 2004 | IDMA | Involver | Best CD Compilation | Won |
| 2004 | IDMA | Sasha | Best European DJ | Nominated |
| 2005 | IDMA | Sasha | Best European DJ | Nominated |
| 2005 | IDMA | Sasha | Best European DJ | Nominated |
| 2005 | IDMA | Sasha | Best Remixer | Nominated |
| 2006 | IDMA | Sasha | Best European DJ | Nominated |
| 2006 | IDMA | Sasha @ Alavon – Instant Live | Best Full Length DJ Mix CD | Nominated |

== Muzik Awards ==
At the 1999 Ericsson Muzik Awards, he received an award for "Outstanding Contributions to Dance Music".

Selected awards
| Year | Award | Nominated work | Category | Result |
|---|---|---|---|---|
| 1999 | Muzik | Sasha | Outstanding Contribution to Dance Music | Won |
| 2001 | Muzik | Sasha | Best DJ | Won |
