= NE3 =

NE3, or NE-3, or similar may refer to:

- National Expressway 3 (India)
- Nebraska's 3rd congressional district
- Nebraska Highway 3, now U.S. Route 136
- New England Interstate Route 3, now U.S. Route 6
- Northern Exposure: Expeditions, a 1999 album by British disc jockeys Sasha and John Digweed
- Outram Park MRT station, Singapore
- NE3, a postcode district in Newcastle upon Tyne, England; see NE postcode area
