= Together as One (festival) =

Electronic music festival in the United States

Together As One
- Dates: New Year's Eve
- Locations: Los Angeles, California, U.S. Tacoma, Washington, U.S.
- Years active: 1998–2011, 2015, 2023 -
- Founders: Go ventures Insomniac
- Website: www.NewYearsEveLA.com

Together as One was an electronic music festival. It was held on New Year's Eve in Los Angeles. It was a joint production by promoters Go Ventures and Insomniac Events through 2010, but is now promoted solely by Go Ventures. Taking place in downtown Los Angeles, Together As One attracts audiences of over 40,000 dance music enthusiasts each year.

== Headliners ==
- 1999/2000: Frankie Bones
- 2000/2001: Mark Farina
- 2006/2007: Paul Van Dyk, Deep Dish, Christopher Lawrence, Danny Howells, and Steve Angello.
- 2007/2008: Ferry Corsten, Sasha & John Digweed
- 2008/2009: Armin Only performance from Armin van Buuren, a 9-hour show that has been taken around the world by van Buuren in support of his new album, Imagine, which featured its highest attendance of party goers of nearly 50,000
- 2009/2010: David Guetta, John Digweed, Dubfire, and Sander Kleinenberg.
- 2010/2011: Laidback Luke, Major Lazer, Wolfgang Gartner, and Rusko.
- 2011/2012: Duck Sauce, The Bloody Beetroots, Dirty South, Diplo, and Felix da Housecat.
- 2023/2024: Seven Lions, The Chainsmokers, Above & Beyond, and Tiësto.

== History ==
Rival Los Angeles promoters Go ventures and Insomniac both had separate New Year's Eve festivals in 1997 called Encore and Countdown, respectively. In 1998, on the eve of 1999, the two promoters joined to start Together As One. A commemorative compilation CD was released by Moonshine Records that year.

In 2011, after creative conflicts between the leaders of the two promoters, Insomniac announced that it would pull out of the partnership. The same year, Insomniac began to organize its own New Year's Eve concert at the Anaheim Convention Center known as White Wonderland. Go Ventures continued to organize the event on its own for 2011–12. However, the 2012–13 edition was abruptly cancelled, with Go Ventures citing unforeseen issues in their attempt to book the Shrine Auditorium for the event.

In 2023, Insomniac announced a one-off revival of Together as One for 2023–24; this event took place at the Tacoma Dome in Tacoma, Washington, headlined by Above & Beyond, The Chainsmokers, Seven Lions, and Tiësto among others.

== See also ==
- List of electronic music festivals
