= NE2 =

NE2, or NE-2, or similar may refer to:

- Nebraska's 2nd congressional district
- Nebraska Highway 2
- New England Interstate Route 2, now U.S. Route 5
- the NE2 postal district, part of the NE postcode area centred on Newcastle upon Tyne
- National Expressway 2 (India)
- Northern Exposure 2, a mix album by Sasha & John Digwee
- a type of neon lamp
