= Northern Exposure (disambiguation) =

Northern Exposure is an American television series

Northern Exposure may also refer to:

- Northern Exposure (album), a 1996 album by Sasha & John Digweed
- Northern Exposure, BBC Northern Ireland TV series showcasing locations throughout Northern Ireland
- Daylighting (architecture), the placing of windows in buildings in the Northern Hemisphere such that they face away from direct sunlight, providing a weaker but more consistent light
