= Northern Exposure: Expeditions =

Compilation album by Sasha & John Digweed
- Released: 21 June 1999
- Recorded: 1998–99
- Genre: Progressive trance
- Length: 140:27
- Labels: INCredible, Ultra Records
- Producers: Sasha, John Digweed

Sasha & John Digweed chronology
Northern Exposure 2 (1997)	Northern Exposure: Expeditions (1999)	Communicate (2000)

Sasha chronology
Xpander (1999)	Northern Exposure: Expeditions (1999)	Global Underground: Ibiza (1999)

John Digweed chronology
Bedrock (1999)	Northern Exposure: Expeditions (1999)	Global Underground: Hong Kong (1999)

Northern Exposure: Expeditions is the fourth mix album by British DJ duo Sasha & John Digweed. Released on 21 June 1999, it is the third and final album in their Northern Exposure series, preceded by Northern Exposure in 1996 and Northern Exposure 2 in 1997. The UK release was featured on INCredible whereas the United States edition was released by Ultra Records. The United States version does not contain the track "Silence"; the UK version does.

Professional ratings
Review scores
Source	Rating
Allmusic	4.5/5 stars

== Track listing ==
=== Disc one ===
1. Breeder – "Tyrantanic (Breeder's Underexposed Mix)" – 9:16
2. Space Manoeuvres – "Stage One (Total Separation Mix)/(Separation Mix)" – 8:09
3. Union Jack – "Morning Glory" – 4:26
4. Jayn Hanna – "Lost Without You (Edge Factor Dub)/(Edge Factor Journey)" – 8:09
5. The Light – "Expand The Room (Four Storeys High Mix)" – 7:28
6. Sasha – "Belfunk" – 7:55
7. Delerium featuring Sarah McLachlan – "Silence (Sanctuary Mix)" – 10:05
8. Chris Raven – "I Know You Love Me Too! (Van Bellen Remix)" – 5:45
9. Blue Planet Corporation – "Micromega" – 4:19
10. Mono Culture – "Free (Extended Vocal Mix)" – 6:50

=== Disc two ===
1. Head Honcho – "Waters of Jericho" – 8:48
2. Mouvement Perpétuel – "Sexuel Mouvement" – 4:09
3. Stef, Pako & Frederik – "Seaside Atmosphere" – 5:15
4. Der Dritte Raum – "Polarstern" – 7:51
5. Voyager – "Pure (Frictions Groove)" – 4:24
6. Red Devil – "Gamelan" – 5:08
7. RR Workshop – "Mess With Da Bull" – 5:54
8. Humate – "Love Stimulation (Oliver Lieb's Softmix)" – 4:24
9. Breeder – "Rockstone" – 6:22
10. Delta Lady – "Anything You Want (The Delta Belter Vocal Symphony)" – 8:04
11. Mike Koglin – "The Silence (Tekara Remix)" – 7:46

== Reception ==
The critical reception of the album was very positive (Allmusic gave the album a higher score than previous Northern Exposure albums).

== Charts ==
UK Compilation Chart: #6 (CD version)
UK Compilation Chart: #37 (Vinyl version)

The many differences between the CD and vinyl versions caused two different entries for the album into the Top 40.
