= Renaissance: The Mix Collection =

1994 mix album by Sasha & John Digweed

Compilation album by Sasha & John Digweed
- Released: 14 October 1994
- Recorded: 1994
- Genre: Progressive house
- Length: 225:32
- Label: Renaissance Records
- Producer: Sasha, John Digweed

Sasha & John Digweed chronology
Renaissance: The Mix Collection (1994)	Northern Exposure (1996)

Sasha chronology
The Qat Collection (1994)	Renaissance: The Mix Collection (1994)	Essential Mix (1995)

John Digweed chronology
Renaissance: The Mix Collection (1994)	Northern Exposure (1996)

Renaissance: The Mix Collection is the debut mix album by British DJ duo Sasha & John Digweed. It was released on 14 October 1994 and was the first in a series of mix albums released under the brand of the Renaissance nightclub. Containing music from the house, progressive house and trance genres, it was intended as a sampler of the kind of music played by the club.

The album was a critical and commercial success, charting and certifying silver in the UK, and considered by many to be one of the greatest mix albums of all time. The release was succeeded by numerous follow-ups, starting with Renaissance: The Mix Collection Part 2 in 1995 mixed by John Digweed solo.

In 2004, on the tenth anniversary of the album's release, a remastered version with a slightly altered track listing was released.

== Background and release ==
Renaissance: The Mix Collection is a mix of house, progressive house and trance house of the early 1990s. The album was mixed by Alexander Coe (aka Sasha) and John Digweed who were both resident DJs at Renaissance in 1994, and the songs chosen were supposed to give the listener "an idea of what [the club] was all about".

The album was released in a triple CD digipack case. The album cover is a renaissance painting of the Hebrew prophet Zechariah, by Michelangelo in the Sistine Chapel. A landscape portrait of a coliseum under a bright blue sky stretches inside the packaging. The CDs are arranged by colour; blue, orange, and green. The story behind Renaissance, the club, between 1992 and 1994 is written on top of the CD flaps.

== Critical reception ==
Resident Advisor said the album was a "landmark CD of its kind" and "the great Daddy of all DJ mix compilations – the cornerstone for all things progressive, and a massive influence for legions of DJs to follow." The Quietus said the album marked the point of when the "second wave of dance music crossed over to a wider audience" and said the album was "arguably one of the first – and best - DJ mixes of its kind to be released on CD", referring to the album's "then upcoming talents of Sasha and John Digweed blended effortlessly a heady and hedonistic miasma of progressive house and early trance that included Leftfield, Underworld, and Age of Love to freeze in time forever the euphoric nights that would become days that would become euphoric nights again," featuring the album in their unordered 2015 list of their "Favourite DJ Mix Albums". In 1996, Mixmag ranked the album at number 26 in its list of the "Best Dance Albums of All Time". In 1997, Q ranked the album in their list of "The 10 Best DJ Mix Albums...Ever!". DJ Mag included it on their list of "5 of the Best DJ Mixes of All Time".

== Remastered 10th anniversary reissue ==
Renaissance: The Mix Collection Remastered 10th Anniversary Edition

Compilation album by Sasha & John Digweed
- Released: 15 November 2004
- Recorded: 2004 (mixed)
- Genre: Progressive house
- Length: 222:18
- Label: Renaissance Records
- Producer: Sasha, John Digweed

Sasha & John Digweed chronology
Communicate (2000)	Renaissance: The Mix Collection Remastered 10th Anniversary Edition (2004)	Sasha & John Digweed present Delta Heavy (2005)

In 2004, to mark the 10th anniversary of its original release, Renaissance reissued the album in a remastered version featuring a slightly altered track listing.

Both M People tracks were removed from this release and replaced with other contemporaneous dance singles: "Renaissance" with "Stand Above Me" by OMD, and "How Can I Love You More" with "I Can't Forget You" (Fathers of Sound Pleasure mix) by Anthony White. These changes were due to copyright issues from the record labels.

The re-issued album is not a straight re-mastering, but a whole new session. Though the original blend sequences remain the same, as do all the original elements, Sasha and Digweed re-created the album using Apple G4 laptops to create, what they considered, a better quality version of the original mix, with recording techniques simply not available in 1994.

== Track listing ==
Track listing as given on the sleeve (although there are errors and omissions which can be seen on Discogs):

=== Disc one ===
1. Leftfield – "Song of Life" (Lemon Interrupt mix) – 5:26
2. Leftfield – "Song of Life" (Dub for Life mix) – 4:02
3. Leftfield – "Song of Life" (Steppin' Razor mix) – 2:16
4. Bedrock featuring KYO – "For What You Dream Of" (Full On Renaissance mix) – 6:19
5. Rhythm Invention – "Chronoclasm" – 2:37
6. Disco Evangelists – "De Niro" (Spaceflight remix) – 6:06
7. Memphisto – "State of Mind" (Quiet mix) – 1:43
8. Moonchild – "V.O.A.T" (original mix) – 5:28
9. Sunscreem – "Perfect Motion" (Heller & Farley's Boy's Own mix) – 10:09
10. River Ocean – "Love & Happiness" (X-Press 2's Junior Boy's Own Super dub) – 4:27
11. That Kid Chris – "Keep on Pressin' On" (Didn't I Show You Luv mix) – 5:48
12. Remake – "Bladerunner"/Inner City – "'Til We Meet Again" (Brothers in Rhythm Perkappella) – 4:24
13. Bump – "House Stompin'" (Big Bump mix) – 7:02
14. F Machine – "Child Bride" (Feedback Max mix) – 4:28
15. M People – "Renaissance" (John Digweed's Full on mix) – 7:41

=== Disc two ===
1. Fluke – "Slid" (PDF mix) – 4:43
2. Funk Machine – "Let's Get This Party Started" (Party mix) – 5:20
3. Fluke – "Slid" (Justin Robertson's Scat & Frenzy) – 5:01
4. Corrado – "Trust" (Pink mix) – 5:02
5. MBG – "Trance 1" (Oriental Psycho Estmix) – 2:01
6. Hysterix – "Talk to Me" (Sasha's Full Master mix) – 7:04
7. Annadin – "Angel" – 7:18
8. Virtualmismo – "Mismoplastico" (Dirtysyncomix) – 3:30
9. Virtualmismo – "Mismoplastico" (original remix) – 5:29
10. Fishbone Beat – "Always" (Psychedelic Martini remix) – 3:39
11. Grace – "Not Over Yet" (Perfecto mix) – 5:47
12. Secret Life – "She Holds the Key" (H.A.L.F. I'm a Believer mix) – 4:16
13. Funtopia featuring Jimi Polo – "Do You Wanna Know" (Gut Drum mix) – 5:07
14. V.F.R. – "Tranceillusion" (Original mix) – 3:16
15. Kym Mazelle – "Was That All It Was" (David Morales' Def mix) – 7:07

=== Disc three ===
1. M People – "How Can I Love You More" (QAT mix) – 7:20
2. Moby – "Go" (Nighttime mix) – 5:19
3. Jaco – "Show Some Love" (original dub) – 6:38
4. Spooky – "Little Bullet" (High Velocity mix) – 6:20
5. Havana – "Sublime Theme" (dub) – 3:48
6. Shawn Christopher – "Another Sleepless Night" (Bassman mix) – 4:17
7. Unity 3 – "Age of Love" (Trance Dub & Fantasy mix) – 4:48
8. EMF – "They're Here" (D:Ream Dream) – 6:10
9. Solar Plexus – "Solar Plexus" – 3:31
10. Havana – "Ethnic Prayer" (Euro mix) – 5:32
11. 2 Bad Mice – "Bombscare" – 3:32
12. Age of Love – "The Age of Love" (Jam & Spoon's Watch Out for Stella mix) – 6:14
13. My Friend Sam featuring Viola Wills – "It's My Pleasure" (Rick van Breugel's club mix) – 5:24
14. Lemon Interrupt – "Dirty" – 4:03

== Charts ==
Chart (1994)	Peak position
UK Compilation (Official Charts Company)	9
Chart (2004)	Peak position
UK Compilation (Official Charts Company)	47

== Certifications ==
Region	Certification	Certified units/sales
United Kingdom (BPI)	Silver	60,000^{^}
^{^} Shipments figures based on certification alone.
