= Airdrawndagger =

2002 album by Sasha

Studio album by Sasha
- Released: 5 August 2002
- Recorded: 2001–02
- Genres: Ambient; house; progressive house; breaks
- Length: 68:25
- Labels: Kinetic; BMG; Deconstruction
- Producers: Sasha; Charlie May; Junkie XL

Sasha chronology
Communicate (2000)	Airdrawndagger (2002)	Involver (2004)

Singles from Airdrawndagger
- 1. "Wavy Gravy" Released: 19 August 2002

Airdrawndagger is the second studio album by Welsh DJ Sasha. It was released on 5 August 2002 through Kinetic Records and BMG, with a digital download release issued by Deconstruction Records. The album features co-production from Charlie May, Junkie XL and James Holden. It was released with one single, "Wavy Gravy", on 19 August 2002, which had an amateur remix contest held in 2003. Despite the release of The Qat Collection in 1994, Airdrawndagger was advertised as Sasha's "debut artist album". Upon release, the album charted on the UK and US Albums Charts, peaking at number 18 and 157 respectively.

== Background ==
The album is named after the term "air-drawn dagger", which was used in William Shakespeare's Macbeth to characterise an emotional outburst. The album is entirely instrumental, and has a different sound from Sasha's other work, such as the Xpander EP. Its tone is more atmospheric and relaxed compared to his mix albums. In a 2013 interview with Dubspot, Sasha stated that the production of this album had relied heavily on use of the Roland JD-800 and the Waldorf WAVE synthesizers, describing them as "the sound of Airdrawndagger". In press releases and marketing, the album was advertised as Sasha's "debut artist album", despite The Qat Collection's release in 1994. Sources reviewing the album largely acknowledged this and described Airdrawndagger as his debut, with notable exceptions including The Guardian, who wrote that "he released [his debut album] in 1994, the underwhelming Qat Collection, but that has been erased, Stalin-style, from his history".

== Release ==
The album was announced in July 2002 with live performances of it scheduled for 24 and 31 August 2002. The album was first released on 5 August 2002. It was released in the UK and Europe through Arista Records, a former subsidiary of BMG. The album was distributed in the US by Kinetic Records on 6 August 2002. The CD versions of the album were continually mixed, with each song segueing into the next, while the vinyl versions were unmixed and featured extended versions of a number of tracks, but lacked "Cloud Cuckoo" and "Requiem". The vinyl release of the album was also given a variant album cover, with a grey spike ball shown.

A digital download version of the album was issued on 17 May 2010 by Deconstruction Records. The album was re-released on 3xLP vinyl in 2020 and 2023 by Music On Vinyl in limited edition runs. These versions featured all 11 tracks, with "Cloud Cuckoo" and "Requiem" taken directly from the CD master.

The album's single, "Wavy Gravy" was released on 19 August 2002 through BMG and Kinetic, and promoted by a remix contest held in 2003. The single charted on the UK Singles Chart at position 64, and on the UK Dance Singles Chart at position 4.

== Critical reception ==
Professional ratings
Aggregate scores
Source	Rating
Metacritic	64/100
Review scores
Source	Rating
AllMusic	4/5 stars
Alternative Press	4/5 stars
Mixer	3.5/5 stars
Music Emissions	3.5/5 stars
Pitchfork	2.5/10
Progressive-Sounds	9/10
Resident Advisor	5/5 stars
URB	3.5/5 stars

Airdrawndagger received generally positive reviews from critics. AllMusic reviewer Glenn Swan gave it four stars out of five, summarising his review with "Airdrawndagger has a sharp blade, and hovers with threat, but it takes almost half the album before it draws blood" although stated that "[when given his mix albums and remixes], Airdrawndagger sounds a bit anticlimactic by comparison". BBC Music reviewer Christian Hopwood noted that "[the] album might come as a disappointment to anyone expecting something akin to a DJ mix CD" but praised the album, describing it as a "glittering, euphoric masterpiece". Robbie Y from Resident Advisor wrote a very positive review, rating the album 5.0 out of 5, describing it as "mixed and produced to perfection, not one stone in the making of this album has been left unturned". However, Pitchfork gave the album a 2.5 out of 10 score, though the review does not discuss the music itself in any form.

== Track listing ==
Airdrawndagger track listing (CD)
No.	Title	Writer(s)	Length
1.	"Drempels"	Alexander Coe; Charlie May	1:24
2.	"Mr. Tiddles"	Coe; May	4:54
3.	"Magnetic North"	Coe; May	5:18
4.	"Cloud Cuckoo"	Coe; May; Tom Holkenborg	8:27
5.	"Immortal"	Coe	4:55
6.	"Fundamental"	Coe	9:14
7.	"Boileroom"	Coe; May	7:04
8.	"Bloodlock"	Coe; James Holden	7:54
9.	"Requiem"	Coe; May; Holkenborg	6:09
10.	"Golden Arm"	Coe; May; Holkenborg	5:45
11.	"Wavy Gravy"	Coe; May	7:30
Total length:			68:25

Airdrawndagger track listing (3xLP)
No.	Title	Writer(s)	Length
1.	"Wavy Gravy"	Coe; May	7:56
2.	"Immortal"	Coe	4:55
3.	"Mr. Tiddles"	Coe; May	4:54
4.	"Bloodlock"	Coe; James Holden	10:14
5.	"Fundamental"	Coe	11:13
6.	"Boileroom"	Coe; May	10:48
7.	"Drempels"	Coe; May	1:29
8.	"Magnetic North"	Coe; May	5:44
9.	"Golden Arm"	Coe; May; Holkenborg	5:55
Total length:			63:08

== Personnel ==
- Alexander Coe (Sasha) – writing, production (all tracks)
- Charlie May – writing, production (all tracks except "Immortal", "Fundamental" and "Bloodlock"), piano, organ
- Tom Holkenborg (Junkie XL) – writing, production ("Cloud Cuckoo", "Requiem" and "Golden Arm"), mixer (all tracks)
- James Holden – writing, production ("Bloodlock")
- Geoff Pesche – mastering (all tracks)
- Iain Roberton – recording
- Simon Wright – additional programming
- Luis Jardim – percussion
- Greg Knowles – instruments
- Steve Lewinson – bass guitar
- Dave Arch – celestia, harpsichord

== Charts ==
Chart performance for Airdrawndagger
Chart (2002)	Peak position
Australian Albums (ARIA)	78
UK Albums (Official Charts Company)	18
US Billboard 200	157
US Dance/Electronic Albums (Billboard)	5
US Heatseekers Albums (Billboard)	5

== Release history ==
Release history and formats for Airdrawndagger
Region	Date	Format	Label	Ref.
UK and Europe	5 August 2002	CD	Arista Records; BMG	
UK and Europe	5 August 2002	Vinyl	Arista Records; BMG	
Russia	5 August 2002	Cassette	BMG Russia	
United States	6 August 2002	CD	Kinetic	
United States	6 August 2002	Vinyl	Kinetic	
UK and Europe	17 May 2010	Digital download	Deconstruction	
