= Bedrock (album) =

Remix album by John Digweed
- Released: 4 October 1999
- Genres: Progressive house, trance, house
- Length: Disc One 73:45, Disc Two 67:54
- Labels: INCredible, Ultra Records, Bedrock Records

John Digweed chronology
Global Underground: Sydney (1998)	Bedrock (1999)	Global Underground: Hong Kong (1999)

Bedrock is a DJ mix album produced by John Digweed. It was released in the United Kingdom on INCredible and in the United States on Ultra Records. The album was based on the music Digweed would play at the long running and successful club night, Bedrock. At the time of the album's release the club night was held at Heaven, London and The Beach, Brighton.

Professional ratings
Review scores
Source	Rating
Allmusic	4.5/5 stars
Pitchfork Media	(7.9/10)

== Track listing ==
=== Disc one ===
1. Raff 'N' Freddy – Listen – 7:41
2. Tiny Trendies – The Sky Is Not Crying (Beutel Bill's Peak-Hour News Mix) – 5:40
3. B.P.T. featuring Danny Morales – Moody (Montreal Men Vocal Dub Remix) – 7:04
4. C12 featuring Jole – Judy (Montreal Men Remix) – 6:02
5. Los Diablos Locos – El Locomotion – 4:01
6. Science Department – Repercussion – 8:20
7. Morel – True (The Faggot Is You) (Deep Dish Poof Daddy Dub) – 3:44
8. Morel – True (The Faggot Is You) (Deep Dish Poof Daddy Remix) – 7:39
9. Jondi & Spesh – We Are Connected (Active Love Mix) – 6:27
10. ABA Structure – Illusion – 5:32
11. Funk Function – Odysseus – 5:02
12. Science Department – Persuasion – 6:24

=== Disc two ===
1. Pob & Taylor – Ba Ba (Human Movement Remix) – 9:19
2. Escape – Salina – 5:57
3. Dakota – Swirl – 6:26
4. Heller & Farley – The Rising Sun (Bedrock Remix) – 9:25
5. Interstate – CC16 – 4:10
6. Voyager – Time Travel – 5:57
7. Sandra Collins – Flutterby – 8:20
8. Mark Hunt – Over & Out – 4:31
9. Slacker – Flying – 6:26
10. Bedrock – Heaven Scent – 7:17
