= Northern Exposure 2 =

- Original UK 2-disc edition cover

Compilation album by Sasha & John Digweed
- Released: 14 July 1997
- Recorded: 1996–1997
- Genres: Progressive house, trance, progressive breaks
- Length: 143:31
- Labels: Ministry of Sound (UK); Ultra (U.S.)
- Producers: Sasha, John Digweed

Sasha & John Digweed chronology
Northern Exposure (1996)	Northern Exposure 2 (1997)	Northern Exposure: Expeditions (1999)

Sasha chronology
Northern Exposure (1996)	Northern Exposure 2 (1997)	Global Underground: San Francisco (1998)

John Digweed chronology
Northern Exposure (1996)	Northern Exposure 2 (1997)	Global Underground: Sydney (1998)

Northern Exposure 2 is the third mix album by British DJ duo Sasha & John Digweed. Released on 14 July 1997, it is the second in their Northern Exposure series, preceded by Northern Exposure in 1996 and succeeded by Northern Exposure: Expeditions in 1999. In the United Kingdom, it was released by Ministry of Sound as a double CD package, whereas in the United States, it was on Ultra Records as two separate CDs — a "West Coast Edition" and an "East Coast Edition".

Like its critically acclaimed predecessor, Northern Exposure 2 is a concept album of specially selected tracks to set up two different "journeys". The first is around the East Coast and the second around the West Coast.

Professional ratings
Review scores
Source	Rating
East: Allmusic	4/5 stars
West: Allmusic	4/5 stars

== Track listing ==
Disc 1: East Coast
No.	Title	Artist(s)	Length
1.	"Believe" (16B Remix)	GusGus	4:06
2.	"Soothe" (Chicane Jazz / Cyanide Ride)	Furry Phreaks	4:58
3.	"Burn the Elastic"	Violet vs. Mantronik	2:01
4.	"Geomantik"	Prana	3:56
5.	"Cycles of Time"	The Acoustic Hoods	4:53
6.	"Dammerung"	Frontside	5:31
7.	"Blue" (LP Mix / Original Mix)	The Experiment / Doi-Oing	6:39
8.	"Little Bullet" (Live Version)	Spooky	5:35
9.	"Botz" (Synthetik Mix)	Überzone	5:43
10.	"Reeferendrum"	Fluke	4:06
11.	"Angel"	Lost Tribe	5:37
12.	"Purple"	GusGus	6:40
13.	"Symphony"	Hybrid	12:40

Disc 2: West Coast
No.	Title	Artist(s)	Length
1.	"Positron"	Cygnus X	5:18
2.	"Fusion" (Live)	Speedy J	8:53
3.	"3.2"	Humate	8:15
4.	"An Accident in Paradise" (William Orbit and Spooky Remix)	Sven Väth	5:26
5.	"Panfried" (Original Mix / Mind Over Matter Mix)	The Light	7:41
6.	"Solar Cycle" (Arrangement Two)	Third Man	4:12
7.	"Netherworld" (Jules Verne mix)	L.S.G.	6:43
8.	"Waters" (Phase III)	Taucher	5:29
9.	"Teach Me" (Clean & Serene Remix by Mantra)	Art of Silence	6:23
10.	"Enervate"	Transa	4:48
11.	"Blue Fear"	Armin	7:58

=== Notes ===
Some tracks are incorrectly listed on the album release, see Northern Exposure 2 at Discogs. These include tracks 03, 08, 10 and 11 (Disc 1); 01 and 08 (Disc 2)

== Charts ==
Chart	Peak position
UK Compilation (Official Charts Company)	15
