= Secret Life (band) =

British R&B band

- Origin: United Kingdom
- Genres: R&B, house, pop
- Years active: 1991–1996
- Labels: Cowboy; Pulse-8
- Past members: Andy Throup; Paul Bryant; Jim Di Salvo; Charlton Antenbring

Secret Life was a British R&B/house and pop band active from 1991 to 1996, particularly popular in the UK and Europe.

== History ==
The first release by Secret Life was a white label recording called "Spanish Lullaby", written and produced by Andy Throup and Jim Di Salvo. This was their first release from their "No Fixed Abode" recording studio, set up in South London. The band then increased in size with the addition of Charlton Antenbring and Paul Bryant. Antenbring was a fashion student, disc jockey and reporter for The Big Issue. Jim Di Salvo contributed on guitars, cubase programming, sampling and music production. Throup was a classically trained pianist and contributed to cubase programming and music production. Bryant was the vocalist. Bryant and Throup co-wrote most of Secret Life's material.

Contemporaneous to the development of Secret Life, Throup was also working with others involved with techno and house music, such as noted techno and house DJ Lenny Dee.

The band toured extensively, particularly in the United Kingdom, and performed on three popular UK TV music shows: The Beat, Dance Energy and The Hitman and Her. They also released several music videos. Di Salvo left the band in 1993 to set up "Bass Boom" recording studios. Di Salvo then released numerous singles and albums under his own name, and the alias act names of "The Juggler", "Bong Brothers" and "Salvo Jets", during the 1990s.

One of Secret Life's first singles "As Always", a 1992 dance arrangement of Stevie Wonder's "As", was one of the most successful records issued by their then label, Cowboy Records, associated with their manager, Charlie Chester. After house producers Masters At Work remixed Secret Life's "Borrowed Time" (1994), Chester moved the band to Pulse-8 Records, with a view to enhanced pop appeal. He was able to obtain an eight album deal from the label. The group was now a core duo of Bryant and Throup. A pop-oriented single, "Love So Strong", previously issued by Cowboy Records in 1993, was remixed and released by Pulse-8 in 1994. Three other singles were released in 1994, followed by an album, Sole Purpose, in 1995. According to one reviewer, "Production from Brothers in Rhythm, Chris Porter and Pete Gleadall give Sole Purpose an R&B and house feel, and the album is topped off with... thoughtful lyrics and smooth vocals."

From 1992 to 1996, the group released eight singles and one album. Five of the singles reached Number 1 on the Coolcuts and Mixmag dance charts in the United Kingdom. Two of the singles were also Top 40 hit record on the UK Singles Chart.

Pulse-8 Records subsequently went bankrupt, ending prospects of further releases through that label. Throup, now known as Andrew Grainger, moved to New York in 2000, and became a lounge pianist and recording studio owner. In 2007, Grainger relocated to Austin, Texas, to continue lounge work. After spending some time in the late 1990s contributing vocals to the work of others, Bryant left the music industry, becoming a support worker for disabled adults in South Gloucestershire, England.

== Discography ==
=== Singles ===
- "As Always" (1992) Cowboy
- "Love So Strong" (1992) Cowboy
- "Love So Strong" (1993) Cowboy
- "I Want You" (1994) Pulse-8
- "Love So Strong" (1994) Pulse-8
- "She Holds The Key" (1994) Pulse-8
- "Love Love Love" (1996) Pulse-8
- "Vehicle" (1996) Pulse-8

=== Albums ===
- Sole Purpose (1995) Pulse-8

==== Compilation inclusions ====
- Sonic System (1992) Telstar; includes "As Always"
- Remix Culture 12/92 (1992) DMC; includes "As Always" (The Greed Remix), plus remixes of Spandau Ballet, Chic and Dina Carroll
- DMC CD Collection 127 (1993) DMC; includes "Love So Strong" (Play Boys Remix)
- Energy Rush Factor 5 (1993) Dino Entertainment; includes "Love So Strong" (Radio Edit)
- Energy Rush Level 3 (1993) Dino Entertainment; includes "As Always"
- Full-On Dance '93 (1993) Cookie Jar 2 CD compilation; includes "Love So Strong"
- Full-On Dance: 20 Kickin' Dance Hits (1993) Cookie Jar; includes "Love So Strong"
- Hey Mr. DJ...The 4th Compilation (1993) Epic; includes "Love So Strong" (Play Boys Arena Dream)
- The Megamix Album 128 (1993) DMC; includes "Love So Strong"
- Underground Selection 8/93 (1993) DMC; includes "Love So Strong" (Play Boys Fully Loaded Mix)
- The Voice of Dance 3 (1993) EVA Belgium 2 CD compilation, includes "As Always" (Gospel Radio Edit)
- Club Together: The Club Sound of 1994 (1994) React/EMI; includes "I Want You"
- Pulsating Rhythms 5 (1994) Pulse-8; includes "Love So Strong" (Play Boys Arena Dream)
- Renaissance: The Mix Collection (1994) Renaissance 3 CD compilation; includes "She Holds The Key" (H.A.L.F. I'm A Believer Mix)
- Club Together 2: The Club Sound of 1995 (1995) React/EMI; includes "Love So Strong"
- Cowboy Records - The Album Volume 1 (1995) RPM/Rodeo; includes "I Want You" (Morales Def Classic 12")
- Cowboy Records - The Album Volume 2 (1995) Rodeo; includes "I Want You" (Morales Def Classic 12")
- United DJs of America, Volume 4: David Morales & Frankie Knuckles (1995) Moonshine 2 CD compilation; includes "Love So Strong"
- United DJs of The World Volume 1 - David Morales & Frankie Knuckles (1995) DMC; includes "Love So Strong"
- United DJs of The World - Frankie Knuckles (1995) DMC; includes "Love So Strong"
- Club Classics '95 (1995) Recurrent; includes "Love So Strong" (Brothers in Rhythm Experience)
- Dance 95 (1995) Circa; includes "Love So Strong" (Brothers in Rhythm Mix)
- Dance Mania 95 Volume 1 (1995) Pure Music; includes "Love So Strong" (Brothers in Rhythm Mix)
- DJs At Work Vol. 1. A Mix by David Seaman (1995) Pimp; includes "Love So Strong" (Brothers in Rhythm Experience)
- Energy Rush K9 (1995) Dino Entertainment; includes "Love So Strong" (Brothers in Rhythm Mix)
- Hit Man 3 (1995) EMI; includes "Love So Strong"
- Para Para Non-Stop Vol. 4 (1995) Meldac; includes "Can I Believe"
- Pulsating Hits - The Best of Pulse-8 1990-1995 (1995) Quality/Indisc/Critique; includes "I Want You"
- Avex Dance Vol 2 (1996) Avex Trax; includes "Love So Strong"
- Climax 2 (1996) Edisom; includes "I Want You" (Play Boys Remix)
- Housemeister (1996) Club Tools 2 CD compilation; includes "Love Love Love" (Frankie Knuckles Classic Radio Mix), included in Megamix by House-Crack Sandro.
- National Anthems (1996) Firm Music 3 CD compilation; includes "Love So Strong" (Brothers in Rhythm Experience) as closing song to the compilation, with Megamix by Chris & James.
- Taneční Liga Vol. 3 (1996) Popron Music; includes "Love Love Love" (Frankie Knuckles Classic Radio Mix)
- The Best of Dance Party Volume 2 (1996) Quality; includes "As Always"
- Circuit Party Spins by DJ Julian Marsh (1997) Rhino; includes "Love Love Love" (Frankified Club Mix)
- Remix Culture 170 (1997) DMC; includes "She Holds The Key" (Remix by Bill Hamel, Neil Kolo & Michael Lacy)
- Pride 1998 by DJ Julian Marsh (1998) Centaur Music 2 CD compilation; includes "Love So Strong"
- 1000 Original Hits - 1992 (2001) EMI; includes "As Always"
- Cowboy Records - The Album (2002) Cowboy 2 CD compilation; includes "As Always" (Old School House Mix)
- Oldskool Ibiza (2002) Decadance 3 CD compilation; includes "As Always" (Gospel Mix)
- Rave Anthems 2: Old Skool Classics (2002) Decadance 3 CD compilation; includes "As Always"
- Best Of The 90s (2003) Disky 2 CD compilation; includes "I Want You"
- Renaissance: The Mix Collection (2004) Renaissance 10th anniversary reissue; includes "She Holds The Key" (H.A.L.F. I'm A Believer Mix)
- Back to Love 03.04 (2004) Hed Kandi 2 CD compilation; includes "As Always" (Gospel Radio edit)
- Renaissance: The Classics (2005) Renaissance 2 CD compilation; includes "As Always"
- Cowboy Records EP - Volume 1 (2005) Simply Vinyl; includes "As Always"
- Cowboy Records EP - Volume 2 (2005) Simply Vinyl; includes "As Always" (Gospel Mix)
- F.E.A. Version.Dosmilcuatro (2007) Sinnamon; includes "Self Delusion"
- The Ultimate 90s Album (2008) Decadance; 3 CD compilation; includes "Love Love Love"
