= Wavy Gravy (instrumental) =

2002 instrumental piece by Sasha

Single by Sasha

from the album Airdrawndagger
- B-side: "4DJS"; "Fundamental"
- Released: 19 August 2002
- Genre: Electronic
- Length: 7:59
- Label: BMG; Kinetic Records
- Songwriter(s): Sasha; Charlie May
- Producer(s): Sasha; Charlie May

Sasha singles chronology
"Scorchio" (2000)	"Wavy Gravy" (2002)	"Artificial Heart" (2003)

"Wavy Gravy" is an instrumental by Welsh DJ Sasha, released as the single from his second studio album, Airdrawndagger. The song features co-production from Charlie May and Simon Wright. It peaked at number 64 on the UK Singles Chart. It is well known for the amateur remix contest which led to the track being remixed by hundreds of producers.

== Background ==
In 2003, a remix contest was announced for the song. Troy Stoner of Tallahassee won first place for his drum 'n' bass remix. After the success of the remix contest, the individual parts of every track from Airdrawndagger were released for remixing by anyone. The single was released with an alternative mix of "Wavy Gravy" (named "4DJS") as well as "Fundamental", an instrumental also from Airdrawndagger.

== Track listing ==
CD
No.	Title	Length
1.	"Wavy Gravy"	7:59
2.	"Fundamental"	11:15
3.	"Wavy Gravy" (4DJS)	6:08

Vinyl – UK
No.	Title	Length
1.	"Wavy Gravy"	7:59
2.	"Wavy Gravy" (4DJS)	6:08
3.	"Fundamental"	11:15

Vinyl – US
No.	Title	Length
1.	"Wavy Gravy"	7:59
2.	"Wavy Gravy" (4DJS)	6:08

== Charts ==
Chart (2002)	Peak position
UK Singles (OCC)	64
UK Dance Singles (Official Charts Company)	4
