= Essential Mix (album) =

Compilation album by Tong, Cox, Sasha and Oakenfold
- Released: 23 November 1995
- Genre: Electronic
- Label: FFRR
- Compiler: Pete Tong; Carl Cox; Sasha; Paul Oakenfold

Pete Tong chronology
The Annual (1995)	Essential Mix (1995)	The Annual II (1996)

Carl Cox chronology
Fantazia presents The DJ Collection Carl Cox (1994)	Essential Mix (1995)	F.A.C.T (1995)

Sasha chronology
Renaissance: The Mix Collection (1994)	Essential Mix (1995)	Northern Exposure (1996)

Paul Oakenfold chronology
Perfection: A Perfecto Compilation (1995)	Essential Mix (1995)	Perfecto Fluoro (1995)

Essential Mix is a mix album by Pete Tong, Carl Cox, Sasha and Paul Oakenfold (all credited mononymously), released on 23 November 1995 through Tong's FFRR. The album charted on the UK Compilation Chart at position 22, and was certified gold by the British Phonographic Industry in 2013.

== Track listing ==
Mix One – Pete Tong
No.	Title	Artist(s)	Length
1.	"Hide-a-Way"	Nu Soul	4:09
2.	"Over & Over"	Plux	4:22
3.	"Nakasaki"	Ken Doh	5:35
4.	"Tempo Fiesta (Party Time) (Roll Fiesta)"	Itty Bitty Boozy Woozy	4:01
5.	"Dancing Daffodils"	The Beat Syndicate	3:52
6.	"Are You Out There"	Crescendo	4:09
7.	"I Need You"	Pendulum	4:41
8.	"Access"	DJ Misjah & DJ Tim	5:20
9.	"Are You Ready to Fly" (Jimmy Miller Remix)	Dune	4:02
10.	"Neurodancer"	Wippenberg	4:43

Mix Two – Carl Cox
No.	Title	Artist(s)	Length
1.	"Harmonic Groove"	Laurent Garnier	3:11
2.	"Outage"	DJ Power Out	2:23
3.	"Dance 2 the Music"	Men with Rhyth	4:33
4.	"Education"	Pox and Cowell	3:39
5.	"Mantra to the Buddha" (Hardfloor Remix)	Hyperspace	3:59
6.	"Cut For Life"	Leftfield	4:28
7.	"Static"	Markey	2:04
8.	"Step Back"	Slam	4:00
9.	"Thunder"	Dave Clarke	2:58
10.	"Let's Turn On"	Doof	2:02

Mix Three – Sasha
No.	Title	Artist(s)	Length
1.	"Paradise Regime"	Blue Amazon	9:27
2.	"Save Me"	Beat Foundation	7:24
3.	"Wired"	Tenth Chapter	8:09
4.	"Rays Of The Setting Sun" (D&D Mix)	Mozaic	10:32

Mix Four – Paul Oakenfold
No.	Title	Artist(s)	Length
1.	"Runaway"	E'voke	8:04
2.	"Coma Aroma" (Perfecto Dub)	Inaura	5:44
3.	"Survive"	Brothers Grimm	2:57
4.	"Skylined"	The Prodigy	5:18
5.	"Floor Essence" (Dayglo Mix)	Man with No Name	3:58
6.	"Down to Earth" (Oakenfold & Osborne Dub Mix)	Grace	3:31
7.	"Star" (Red Jerry Mix)	Utah Saints	4:37
8.	"Sun" (Jam El Mar Mix)	Virus	5:40

== Charts ==
Chart	Peak position
UK Compilation (Official Charts Company)	22
US Independent Albums (Billboard)	38

== Certifications ==
Region	Certification	Certified units/sales
United Kingdom (BPI)	Gold	100,000^{*}
^{*} Sales figures based on certification alone.
