= Union City Recordings =

British electronic music record label

- Founded: 1992
- Location: West London

Union City Recordings was an electronic music record label set up by Circa Records in 1992, from their operations in West London. The label was managed by Rob Manley and specialised in deep house music, which was popular in clubs at the time. The label's catalogue ran to 29 releases across the various formats of the time (12" vinyl singles, CD singles and one compilation album, Colours). The label is best remembered for releases by RuPaul and Sasha's first single, "Appolonia" (under the name "B.M. EX"). Other artists to record for the label included M.A.N.I.C., 4 Love ("Hold Your Head Up High"), Mark Kinchen, Sure is Pure and TC 1992 ("Funky Guitar"). The first releases had sleeves designed by Union Design of Shoreditch, but were later replaced by non-branded white label bags, which were intended to increase popularity with DJs and specialist record stores such as Black Market.

== See also ==
- List of record labels
