= Structures (John Digweed album) =

Compilation album by John Digweed
- Released: 12 July 2010
- Genre: Progressive house
- Label: Bedrock Records

John Digweed chronology
Bedrock Eleven (2009)	Structures (2010)

Structures is a compilation album by English progressive house DJ and producer John Digweed, released on 12 July 2010 by Digweed's own label Bedrock Records.

== Track listing ==
Disc 1
No.	Title	Artist	Length
1.	"Colache" (Sometimes Mix)	Luis Junior
2.	"Babylon" (John Daly Remix)	Alex Dolby & Santos
3.	"My Real Name Is"	Wiretappeur
4.	"On and Amp" (Vincenzo Remix)	Mutant Clan
5.	"No Walls" (Maher Daniel Remix)	Alex Dolby & Santos
6.	"Cream" (Wiretappeur Remix)	Dirty Mongrel
7.	"Alameda Jau Dub"	King Roc & Dimitri Nakov
8.	"Colmedream"	Cristian Verela
9.	"Put It to Bed"	Rowdent
10.	"Boom Boom"	Quivver
11.	"Perras A Tutti"	Cristian Verela
12.	"2000000 Dubs"	King Unique
13.	"2000000 Suns" (John Digweed & Nick Muir Remix)	King Unique
14.	"In Your Boat"	Quivver

Disc 2
No.	Title	Artist	Length
1.	"In Search of Silver" (Structures Edit)	Nick Warren
2.	"Esperanza" (Umbral Aguir Remix)	Guy J
3.	"Unexpiritualized" (Pete Heller Remix)	Marc Marzenit
4.	"Meteor" (Beats)	John Digweed & Nick Muir
5.	"Aurora Borealis"	Ian O'Donovan
6.	"Jungle Laps" (John Digweed & Nick Muir Remix)	Marco Bailey
7.	"Neo Galaxy"	Marc Marzenit
8.	"Pushin' Too Hard" (Nic Fanciulli Remix)	Saints & Sinners
9.	"Tangent" (Marco Bailey Remix)	John Digweed & Nick Muir
10.	"Flyertalk" (Wehbba Remix)	Christian Smith
11.	"Persuader" (Psycatron Remix)	Mutant Clan
12.	"Etiam"	Cristian Verela
13.	"Dreams Are Maps"	Sian
14.	"Rayavadee"	Marco Bailey & Tom Hades
15.	"Feniksas"	King Unique
16.	"BG" (Beats)	Luis Junior
17.	"Collusion"	Erphun & Thee O
18.	"Esperanza" (Sistema Remix)	Guy J
19.	"Satellite" (EFX)	John Digweed & Nick Muir

DVD
No.	Title	Length
1.	"Eye of the Storm" (Documentary by Pablo Casacuberta)
2.	"John Digweed – Live at the Vagabond" (Recorded at the Bedrock/Creations Party at Vagabond Miami 27 March 2010)
3.	"Slideshow"
4.	"Documentary Slideshow"
5.	"Vagabond Slideshow"
6.	"Bedrock Artwork Slideshow"
