= Northern Exposure (album) =

Compilation album by Sasha & John Digweed
- Released: 27 September 1996
- Recorded: 1990–96
- Genres: Progressive house; trance
- Length: 146:45
- Labels: Ministry of Sound (UK); Ultra (U.S.)
- Producers: Sasha; John Digweed

Sasha & John Digweed chronology
Renaissance: The Mix Collection (1994)	Northern Exposure (1996)	Northern Exposure 2 (1997)

Sasha chronology
Essential Mix (1995)	Northern Exposure (1996)	Northern Exposure 2 (1997)

John Digweed chronology
Renaissance: The Mix Collection (1994)	Northern Exposure (1996)	Northern Exposure 2 (1997)

Professional ratings
Review scores
Source	Rating
Allmusic	(Single disc version)
Muzik	4/5 stars
Pitchfork	8.7/10

Northern Exposure is the second mix album by British DJ duo Sasha & John Digweed. Released on 27 September 1996, it is the first in their Northern Exposure series, followed by Northern Exposure 2 in 1997 and Northern Exposure: Expeditions in 1999. There is both a British edition released by Ministry of Sound and an American edition released by Ultra Records in 1997. The British package contains both CDs, whereas the American only has the first disc. In 2013, the album was certified silver in the UK.

== Background ==
The album is a concept album of tracks specially selected and mixed as two different "journeys", the first being the north journey, and the second being the south journey. The DJ duo's following mix albums are also concept albums.

Another version of Northern Exposure was also released as a quadruple vinyl LP in the UK released with the record label of Ministry of Sound. It differs greatly from the CD in that the tracks are not mixed, lacking any DJ-driven transition between tracks. Sasha and Digweed also removed some of the tracks and shuffled the remaining tracks around, to make a new "journey" experience to the listeners. Some tracks are also changed from the North disc to the South disc and vice versa.

== Reception ==
The album reached number 7 initially in the UK Compilation Chart. In The Mix ranked Northern Exposure the 5th best mix album of all time in its list of the top 30 ever, saying it's "considered the pinnacle of Sasha and Digweed’s joint efforts, Northern Exposure confirmed the mastery of both DJs. It’s what every mix-CD wants to be: timeless" Rolling Stone ranked the album as the 25th "greatest EDM album ever", saying "good DJs take you on a journey, and Welsh and English icons Sasha and John Digweed (respectively) – whether working together or separately – specialized on rolling the listener through Nineties Progressive House and Trance's most bucolic landscapes. Their best-loved mix CD is a trippy traipse through the verdant world of progressive house, a genre with one foot in the rave and the other somewhere in the great beyond. Track titles like "Raincry" (by God Within) and "Out of Body Experience" (by Rabbit in the Moon) tell you plenty about where this music's head is at. Also on this nature hike: William Orbit, well before he met Madonna."

== Track listing ==
Disc 1: 0° North
No.	Title	Artist(s)	Length
1.	"Satellite Serenade" (The Orb's Transasianexpress Mix)	Keiichi Suzuki	10:40
2.	"Cascade (Part 1)"	The Future Sound of London	7:05
3.	"These Waves"	Young American Primitive	4:24
4.	"Raincry (Submerged)"	God Within	7:51
5.	"Out of Body Experience"	Rabbit in the Moon	7:07
6.	"I Am Free" (Playdo's Minimalist Mix / The Full-Length La Serrena Mix)	Morgan King	7:22
7.	"Kites" (Purple Haze's Fantasy Flite Part One)	Ultraviolet	4:11
8.	"Obsession" (William Orbit's Quantum Loop Mix)	Fuzzy Logic featuring Erire	4:59
9.	"Water from a Vine Leaf" (Spooky's Xylem Flow Mix)	William Orbit	6:49
10.	"Liquid Cool" (Deep Forest's Ice Cold @ the Equator Mix)	Apollo 440	6:25
11.	"Last Train to Lhasa"	Banco de Gaia	10:45

Disc 2: 0° South
No.	Title	Artist(s)	Length
1.	"Wave Dub"	Dope on Plastic	5:59
2.	"Sound System" (Underworld Mix)	Drum Club	7:02
3.	"The Gloom"	Castle Trancelott	6:38
4.	"Wavespeech" (Junior Vasquez Mix)	Pete Lazonby	6:08
5.	"Phoenix"	Evolution	7:07
6.	"Dusk"	The Light	3:48
7.	"Plan 94 (The Voyage)"	X Tracks	5:46
8.	"I Can't Stop (Parrot Trance)"	Mellow Mellow	4:32
9.	"Heliopolis" (Eedupolis Dog Mix)	Banco de Gaia	3:33
10.	"East" (Opium Den Mix)	Humate and Rabbit in the Moon	7:36
11.	"Dark & Long" (Dark Train)	Underworld	10:58

== Charts ==
Chart	Peak position
UK Compilation (Official Charts Company)	7

== Certifications ==
Region	Certification	Certified units/sales
United Kingdom (BPI)	Silver	60,000^{^}
^{^} Shipments figures based on certification alone.
