= Trancesetters =

Trancesetters is a Dutch electronic music duo of Gaston Steenkist and Alex Dijksterhuis. They are best known for their singles "Roaches" and "Synergy", released on Hooj Choons, both of which reached the UK Singles Chart. Their work has featured on numerous remix albums by DJs such as Carl Cox, Sasha & Digweed, and the Global Underground series. Alex Dijksterhuis died on February 27, 2023.

== Singles ==
- "Roaches" (2000) - UK #55
- "Synergy" (2001) - UK #72
