= The Qat Collection =

Studio album by Sasha
- Released: 23 August 1994
- Recorded: 1993–94
- Genre: Electronic; progressive house
- Length: 70:37
- Label: Deconstruction
- Producer: Sasha; Tom Frederikse

Sasha chronology
The Qat Collection (1994)	Renaissance - The Mix Collection (1994)

Sasha studio album chronology
The Qat Collection (1994)	Airdrawndagger (2002)

Singles from The Qat Collection
- 1. "Higher Ground" Released: 1994; 2. "Magic" Released: 1994

Professional ratings
Review scores
Source	Rating
Music Week	3/5 stars
Select	2/5 medals

The Qat Collection is the debut studio album by Welsh DJ Sasha. It was released on 23 August 1994 through Deconstruction Records. The album features co-production from Tom Frederikse and was released with two singles: "Magic" and "Higher Ground", both featuring vocals from Sam Mollison. Upon release, the album charted on the UK Albums Chart, reaching position 56. Later in 1994, an extended revision of the album was released, titled The Qat Collection Version 2.

== Background ==
The release's classification as an album has been disputed. In a review of Sasha's second studio album, Airdrawndagger, Paul Cooper from Pitchfork stated "don't call it an album nor an EP" in reference to The Qat Collection. In a 2005 review of Armin van Buuren's second studio album, Shivers, BBC Music reviewer Jack Smith noted that "we'll discount 2003's 76 [van Buuren's debut] as that would be like saying Sasha's first full-length album was The Qat Collection". Dorian Lynskey from The Guardian cited the album as his debut, writing that "he released [his debut album] in 1994, the underwhelming Qat Collection, but that has been erased, Stalin-style, from his history".

Despite The Qat Collection's release, Sasha's 2002 album, Airdrawndagger was advertised as his "debut artist album".

== Release ==
The album's two singles, "Higher Ground" and "Magic" were produced by Sasha and Tom Frederikse, featured vocals from Sam Mollison, and were released through Deconstruction Records. The first single, "Higher Ground", was released in 1993 and peaked at number 19 on the UK Singles Chart. The album's second single, "Magic", was released in 1994 and peaked at number 32 on the UK Singles Chart, and number 11 on the UK Dance Singles Chart. The album was released on 23 August 1994 and charted on release, peaking at number 56.

== Track listing ==
No.	Title	Writer(s)	Length
1.	"Minimal Qat"	Alexander Coe; Tom Frederikse	9:45
2.	"Magic" (with Sam Mollison)	Coe; Frederikse; Sam Mollison	12:36
3.	"Animal Qat"	Coe; Frederikse	13:12
4.	"Higher Ground" (with Sam Mollison)	Coe; Frederikse; Mollison	10:16
5.	"Vegetable Qat"	Coe; Frederikse	10:57
6.	"(As If By) Magic" (Dub)	Coe; Frederikse; Mollison	13:49
Total length:			70:37

The Qat Collection Version 2
No.	Title	Length
1.	"Minimal Qat"	9:43
2.	"Higher Ground"	10:13
3.	"Magic" (Sasha's Black Magic Mix)	7:21
4.	"Animal Qat"	13:09
5.	"Magic" (Pob's Seismix)	7:12
6.	"Higher Ground" (Big Brothers Mix)	9:59
7.	"Vegetable Qat"	10:18
8.	"Magic" (Junior's Factory Mix)	10:03
Total length:		78:05

== Personnel ==
Adapted from liner notes.

- Alexander Coe (Sasha) – writing, production (all tracks)
- Tom Frederikse – writing, production (all tracks)
- Sam Mollison – writing, vocals ("Magic" and "Higher Ground")
- Donna Gardier – vocals ("Vegetable Qat")
- Ray Mann – trumpet ("Minimal Qat")
- Gaëtan Schurrer – additional production

== Charts ==
Chart	Peak position
UK Albums (Official Charts Company)	56
