= Sasha & John Digweed =

British DJ duo

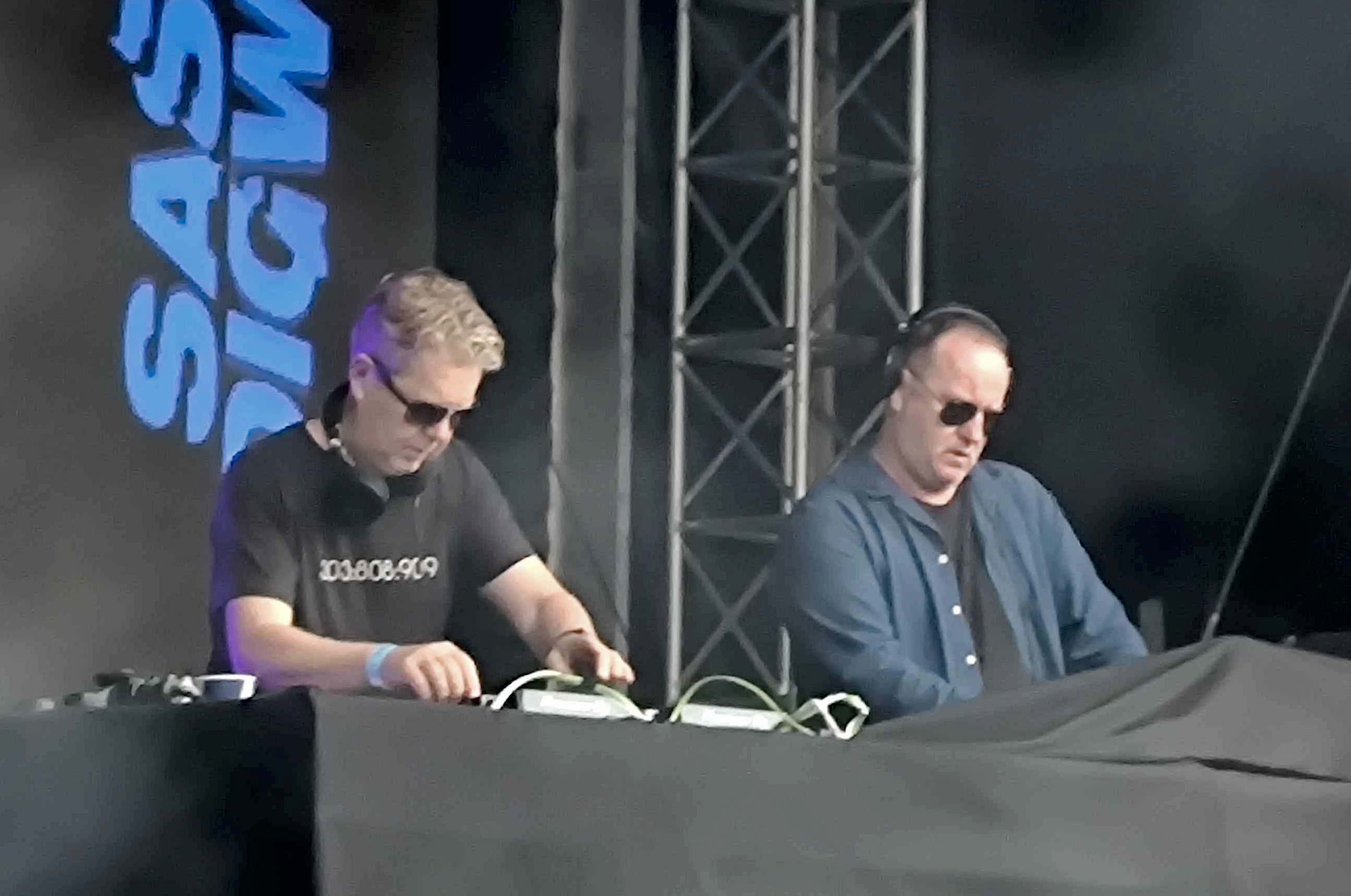
- Sasha (right) and John Digweed (left) in 2025

Background information
- Origin: Mansfield, England (at the Renaissance club)
- Genres: Progressive house, Progressive trance, deep house, techno
- Instruments: Digital audio workstation; synthesiser; sampler; drum machine; turntables; keyboards
- Years active: 1993–present
- Labels: Renaissance; Ministry of Sound; INCredible; Ultra; Kinetic; System
- Members: Sasha; John Digweed

Sasha & John Digweed are a British DJ duo comprising Sasha and John Digweed. Digweed had been DJing for ten years before getting a gig at Renaissance where he met Sasha, who had been working the past few years in various acid house music clubs and raves. Together, they honed their DJ skills, focusing on track selection and technical mixing abilities. In 1994, they released the triple CD mix album Renaissance: The Mix Collection on Renaissance Records. It contained many popular dance hits of the time from artists such as Leftfield, Fluke, and 2 Bad Mice as well as original productions and remixes from themselves. Two years later, the duo became "true superstars" (AllMusic) with the release of their double CD Northern Exposure on mega-label Ministry of Sound. This release was brought to the United States the next year in a single CD package on Ultra Records. 1997 saw the release of the Northern Exposure 2 double CD mix album, again on Ministry of Sound. Sasha and Digweed toured internationally, helping define the sound of progressive house & trance music in the late 1990s. In 1998, both John Digweed and Sasha released separate mix albums on Boxed as part of the Global Underground series with Digweed's GU 006: Sydney and Sasha's GU 009: San Francisco release.

In the late 1990s, Digweed and Sasha took up residency at New York City's famous Twilo nightclub as well as releasing their third edition in the Northern Exposure series: Northern Exposure: Expeditions. They both continued their success in the Global Underground series with Digweed's GU 014: Hong Kong and Sasha's GU 013: Ibiza. In addition to their residency, they toured the United States, especially to promote their DJ mix Communicate in 2000. Shortly thereafter, they embarked on their international Delta Heavy Tour in 2002. They have collaborated little since Delta Heavy. They appeared together at the 2007 Bonnaroo Music Festival, and counted down the new year during a four-hour set in Los Angeles at Together As One.

In 2008, Sasha & Digweed announced their plans to do another tour of North America taking in 21 cities in one month, as they announced the Sasha and John Digweed Spring Club Tour 2008. The tour began at the Winter Music Conference on 27 March at the club Mansion. This was the first time they toured North America together in six years.

In 2009, Sasha & Digweed headlined the SW4 festival in London's Clapham Common.

== History ==
=== Early years and Renaissance (1993–1995) ===
In early 1993, Renaissance DJs Sasha and John Digweed teamed up for DJ sets together. The pair had honed their DJing skills, often performing in tandem and focusing on track selection and technical mixing abilities. Renaissance was pleased with their performances together. Renaissance decided to let the duo compile the triple mix album, entitled Renaissance - The Mix Collection, releasing it on the club's own Renaissance Records label in April 1994, by which point Sasha had already left Renaissance. Sasha had been featured on the cover of Mixmag with the tagline "SON OF GOD?", though he did not welcome the accolade. The album featured tracks from such artists as Leftfield, Fluke, and 2 Bad Mice, and original productions and remixes from Sasha and Digweed, and was successful in the UK Compilation Chart where it peaked at #9. Another album, Renaissance: The Mix Collection Part 2, acting as the second part to Renaissance: The Mix Collection, was released in 1995. As Sasha had left Renaissance, John Digweed mixed this album alone.

=== Northern Exposure (1996–2000) ===
After touring together for a further two years, the duo became "true superstars" with the release of their next mix album, the double Northern Exposure on the Ministry of Sound's record label. The album was designed as a concept album of two "journeys", disc one being 0° North and the second, 0° South. A special unmixed version of the album with a highly altered track list was released on vinyl. The album was critically acclaimed and is generally considered a landmark in the history of progressive house.

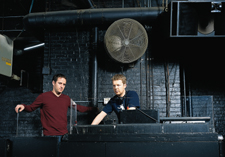
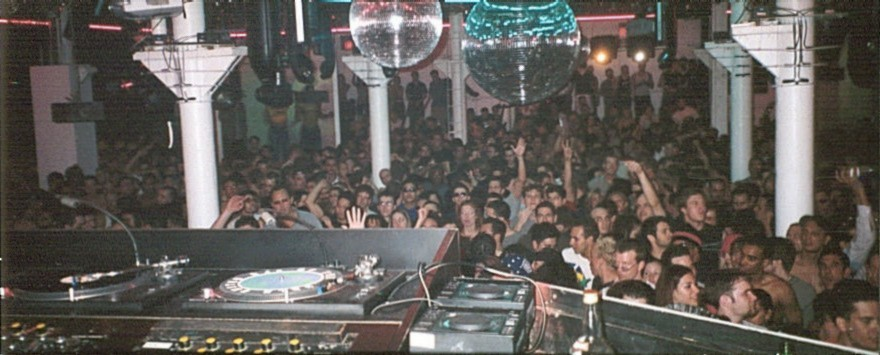
Sasha and Digweed took up residency at Twilo nightclub.

In 1997, the duo worked on a follow-up to Northern Exposure, again following the concept album theme, with one disc representing the West Coast and the other disc the East Coast. It was released in 1997 on the Ministry of Sound label as Northern Exposure 2. The album only charted at #15 in the UK Compilation Chart but it was again a critical success. To support the album, the duo toured internationally, and in the process helped to define the sound of trance music in the late 1990s. After extensive touring, Digweed and Sasha took up residency at New York City's famous Twilo nightclub, where they would DJ for the entire night. In 1998, the two released separate mix albums on the Boxed label, as part of the Global Underground series: Digweed's Global Underground 006: Sydney, and Sasha's Global Underground 009: San Francisco, which drew from Sasha's experience touring on the West Coast of the United States. Both DJs formed their own record labels that year: Sasha created Excession Records and Digweed started Bedrock Records. Excession released fewer than ten records, the last in 1998; the experience, however, led Sasha to found the management agency "Excession: The Agency LTD." Excession remains a booking agency for many DJs, including Hybrid, Nick Warren, and Steve Lawler.

In 1998, Sasha and Digweed reunited in the studio to record their third and final album for the Northern Exposure series, Northern Exposure: Expeditions, which saw the duo voyage into exploring vocal trance. Popular with critics, it charted better in the UK Compilations Chart than their previous albums, the CD version charting at #6 (the vinyl edition of the album, largely different from the CD version, charted at #37).

=== Communicate (2000–2001) ===
In between touring and producing original material, Sasha and Digweed released the mix album Communicate in 2000, prompting them to temporarily leave their Twilo residency for a promotional tour of the United States. Communicate had reasonable commercial success, but it received mixed reviews: Spin stated that despite a "few stellar moments, [Communicate] is ultimately a let-down". LAUNCHcast, too, described Communicate as "boring and lackluster...stalled in a monochrome world of dead beats". To promote the album, the duo toured the United States.

During the late 1990s, the increased popularity and visibility of "superstar DJs" led to the creation of superclubs such as Liverpool's Cream and Sheffield's Gatecrasher. By 2003, however, electronic dance music clubs languished. Though dance music had been declared "dead" by many in the dance industry, Sasha continued to tour—despite the closing of many superclubs, including his resident club Twilo in May 2001. Sasha was unable to play their last gigs at Twilo due to an ear injury, leaving Digweed to perform alone.

=== Delta Heavy tour and hiatus (2002–2006) ===
Sasha and Digweed began their ambitious Delta Heavy Tour of the United States in 2002, following the closing of Twilo. The tour featured veteran tour producer Kevin Lyman and opening act Jimmy Van M, the tour covered 31 cities and played to 85,000 people. Sasha and Digweed performed at Water Street Music Hall in Rochester, New York in April 2002. The appearances were complete with laser shows and video production, were similar to rock concerts than to typical DJ events. This motif was new to the DJing scene, and compelled other DJs to host similar concerts.

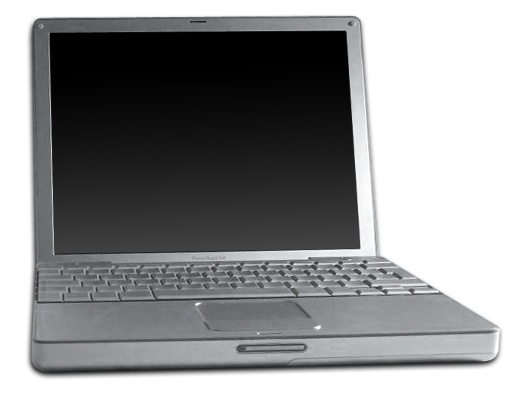
In 2004, Sasha and Digweed recreated Renaissance: The Mix Collection on PowerBook G4 laptops for its tenth anniversary.

2004 marked the tenth anniversary of Renaissance: The Mix Collection, which had been out of print for years prior. Sasha and Digweed decided to release an anniversary edition of the album. However, rather than re-release the album straight forward, they recreated the album in a brand new session. Two tracks by M People that featured on the original 1994 release had to be dropped due to licensing issues, so they were replaced by a track each by Orchestral Manoeuvres in the Dark and Anthony White respectively. Though the original blend sequences from the original album remained the same, Sasha and Digweed re-created the album using Apple G4 laptops in order to create, what they considered, a better quality version of the original mix, with recording techniques simply not available in 1994, as well as the advantage of crystal clear audio, and spatial separation of frequencies within the song, making it sound more dynamic.

The duo's next release was based on Delta Heavy. The release was a Region 1 DVD of performance highlights, interviews, and behind-the-scenes footage, Sasha & John Digweed present Delta Heavy, released on System Recordings. Ben Turner, creator of the DanceStar awards, retrospectively described the Delta Heavy tour as "a landmark moment for electronic music".

Though the duo of Sasha and Digweed never explicitly split up, demanding schedules and frequent independent touring prevented any substantial collaboration for a long period after Delta Heavy.

=== Reunion (2006–present) ===
Though frequent performing and other activities prevented them from working together for several years, Sasha and Digweed announced that they would reunite for a few Australian performances, starting in November 2006. The duo performed at several venues, including Sydney, Brisbane, and Melbourne as well as numerous tour dates which had followed throughout 2007. In 2008, Sasha and Digweed started an American tour with a performance at the Winter Music Conference. The duo played at mainly larger venues on the weekends and smaller (750-1000 people) shows on weekdays. Sasha described their music as "driving and dark" with "a little throwback of Twilo sounds". They appeared together at the 2007 Bonnaroo Music Festival, and counted down the new year during a 4-hour set in Los Angeles at Together As One. Another extensive hiatus as a live duo took place after the 2010 WMC Miami Boat Cruise set. After a surprise b2b performance on Easter of 2016, Sasha and Digweed confirmed via Twitter that a world tour was in the works beginning in September which commenced on 9 September at the Social Festival in Kent, UK. They have toured intermittently and extensively on a global scale together since.

== Discography ==
=== Mix albums ===
| Title | Information | Peak chart positions | | | | Certifications (sales thresholds) |
| Title | Information | UK Comp | US | US Heat | US Ind | Certifications (sales thresholds) |
|---|---|---|---|---|---|---|
| Renaissance: The Mix Collection | Released: 14 October 1994; Label: Renaissance Recordings; Format: CD, digital download, cassette | 9 | — | — | — | BPI: Silver |
| Northern Exposure | Released: 27 September 1996; Label: Ministry of Sound, Ultra; Format: CD, cassette, digital download, vinyl | 7 | — | — | — | BPI: Silver |
| Northern Exposure 2 | Released: 14 July 1997; Label: Ministry of Sound, Ultra; Format: CD, cassette, digital download | 15 | — | — | — | |
| Northern Exposure: Expeditions | Released: 21 June 1999; Format: CD, digital download, vinyl | 6 | — | — | — | |
| Communicate | Released: 26 June 2000; Label: INCredible, Kinetic; Format: CD, digital download, vinyl | 13 | 149 | 5 | 10 | |
"—" denotes a recording that did not chart or was not released in that territory.

=== Video albums ===
| Title | Information |
|---|---|
| Sasha & John Digweed present Delta Heavy | Released: 7 February 2006; Label: System Recordings; Format: DVD |
