= Proper Filthy Naughty =

Proper Filthy Naughty is a musical production duo consisting of John Ross and Joe Williams, who have also worked under the names Salamander and The Light. They have had releases on Platipus Records, FFRR, and Hooj Choons. Their single "Expand the Room" (done as The Light) was featured on several compilations such as Sasha & John Digweed's Northern Exposure: Expeditions. In the 2000s, they changed their name to Proper Filthy Naughty and have since released several singles on 10 Kilo.

== Discography ==
Albums:

- 2003: Proper Filthy Naughty - Fascination (10 Kilo)

Singles:

- 1996: Salamander - "Going Home" (AAA Recordings)
- 1996: The Light - "Dusk" (AAA Recordings)
- 1996: The Light - "Panfried" (AAA Recordings)
- 1997: The Light - "Expand the Room" (AAA Recordings, Hooj Choons)
- 2000: The Light - "Opium" (City of Angels)
- 2000: Proper Filthy Naughty - "Put Your Earphones On" (10 Kilo)
- 2000: Proper Filthy Naughty - "Stitch Up" (10 Kilo)
- 2003: Proper Filthy Naughty - "To the Beat" (10 Kilo)
- 2000: Proper Filthy Naughty - "Flow" (10 Kilo)
- 2000: Proper Filthy Naughty - "Make a Move/Coils" (10 Kilo)

=== Remixes ===
- Gus Gus - "Purple (Sasha vs. The Light Remix)" (4AD)
- Orbital - "Belfast (Sasha vs. The Light Remix)" (FFRR)
- The Crystal Method - "Comin' Back (The Light's Southern Grit Remix)" (Outpost)
- 2003: Fascination (the Droyds remix)
