= Involver =

Compilation album by Sasha
- Released: 14 June 2004
- Recorded: 2003
- Genre: Progressive house; breaks
- Length: 77:37
- Label: Global Underground
- Producer: Sasha; Charlie May; Simon Wright

Sasha chronology
Airdrawndagger (2002)	Involver (2004)	Fundacion NYC (2005)

Professional ratings
Review scores
Source	Rating
AllMusic	3.5/5 stars
Progressive-Sounds	4/5 stars
Resident Advisor	4.5/5 stars

Involver is a mix album by Welsh DJ Sasha. It was released on 14 June 2004 through British record label Global Underground. Tracks by other artists which Sasha admired were chosen for the album and have each been remixed to give his own interpretation of them. It received generally favorable reviews for its track selection and creative mixing techniques. The compilation features additional co-production from British producers Charlie May and Simon Wright. It is Sasha's only mix album to chart on the UK and US Albums Chart, peaking at numbers 61 and 200 respectively on release.

== Background ==
In 2005, the Grammy committee debated whether Involver was eligible for nomination as Best Electronic/Dance Album. The Recording Academy decided that the album was eligible, but Involver did not receive a nomination. Sasha did receive a Grammy nomination for his remix of Felix da Housecat's "Watching Cars Go By", which was featured on Involver.

On 11 September 2013 Sasha made the entire album available for streaming on his personal YouTube channel.

== Track listing ==
No.	Title	Artist(s)	Length
1.	"Talk Amongst Yourselves"	Grand National	10:22
2.	"Dorset Perception"	Shpongle	9:31
3.	"These Days"	Petter	2:54
4.	"What Are You to Me?"	Unkle	4:07
5.	"Smile"	The Youngsters	9:33
6.	"Belong"	Spooky	7:37
7.	"In a State"	Unkle	5:39
8.	"Burma"	Lostep	12:01
9.	"Watching Cars Go By"	Felix Da Housecat	8:11
10.	"On My Own"	Ulrich Schnauss	7:42
Total length:			77:37

== Charts ==
Chart (2004–08)	Peak position
UK Albums (Official Charts Company)	61
UK Dance Albums (Official Charts Company)	7
US Billboard 200	200
US Dance/Electronic Albums (Billboard)	1
US Heatseekers Albums (Billboard)	9
US Independent Albums (Billboard)	14
