= John Digweed =

British DJ, record producer and actor

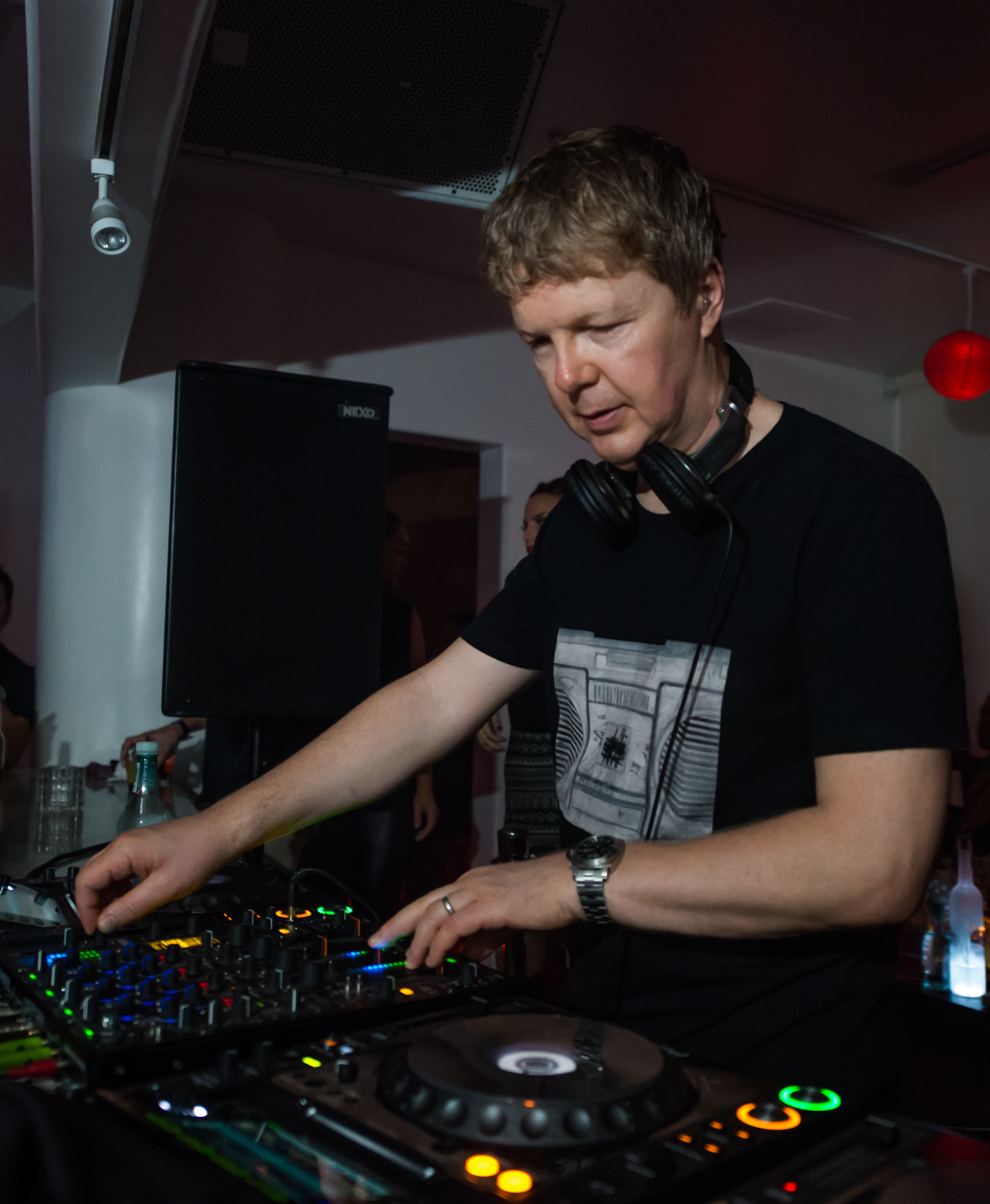
- Digweed in 2014

Background information
- Born: Thomas John Digweed; 1 January 1967 (age 59); Hastings, England
- Genres: House; progressive house; tech house; techno; progressive trance
- Occupations: Disc jockey; record producer; record label owner
- Years active: 1989–present
- Labels: Bedrock Records; Global Underground; Pioneer; Renaissance
- Member of: Sasha & John Digweed; Bedrock
- Website: johndigweed.com

John Digweed (born 1 January 1967) is a British DJ and record producer. As well as achieving success as a solo act, he has collaborated with Sasha as Sasha & John Digweed, and with Nick Muir as Bedrock. Digweed was voted as No. 1 DJ in DJ Mag in 2001.

== Biography ==
Digweed began DJing at the age of 15, and made a name for himself in his home town of Hastings, where he put on successful club nights, the most famous of which were his successful raves on Hastings Pier, where the likes of Carl Cox and The Prodigy performed. His breakthrough came in 1993, when he sent a mixtape demo to Geoff Oakes, founder of the Renaissance nightclub in Mansfield, who played it to fellow DJ Alexander Coe (aka Sasha). The two DJs struck up a long-term friendship and working relationship, despite Sasha twice failing to turn up for gigs that Digweed had booked him for in Hastings.

In partnership with Sasha, Digweed is known for promoting progressive house and notable for producing the first commercial compilation for a nightclub, when they released their 1994 compilation of mixes from Renaissance entitled Renaissance: The Mix Collection. Until then, mixtapes from clubs had only been circulated by DJs on an amateur basis. The Renaissance CD was the first time that a compilation CD had been planned strategically for marketing, from artwork to promotion. The two DJs famously followed this up with their Northern Exposure compilations and those on Global Underground.

Digweed then started the record label Bedrock Records to further promote the music that he was playing at the time. He and his friend Nick Muir went on to produce under the Bedrock alias, getting their big break when their first track "For What You Dream Of" was used in the film Trainspotting. The Bedrock duo also produced the soundtrack for the MTV adult cartoon superhero drama series, Spider-Man: The New Animated Series in 2003. In his sets, Digweed is noted for adopting tracks with new and different styles.

Between 2000 and 2005, Digweed promoted his "Bedrock" sound with monthly club nights for club members and newcomers to the electronic music scene. He played on Thursday nights at Heaven in London, and on Friday nights in a smaller club night at The Beach in Brighton. These nights featured numerous guest DJs, including Danny Howells, Phil Thompson, Hernan Cattaneo and Chris Fortier. As Digweed's international schedule increased, these events drew to a close, although occasional reunions have been held at Heaven since. He celebrated ten years of his Bedrock club night on 10 October 2008 at Matter in London, with a near on ten-hour set.

Digweed has enjoyed popularity throughout North America as well as Europe. He and Sasha established a monthly residency at the now defunct New York club Twilo, which proved a key location for the American electronic music scene. The residency began in 1997 with a lukewarm reception, but grew into one of the most popular club nights in New York City by the end of its run in 2001. He also played in 2001 for 11 hours at the Cavo Paradiso, located at the island of Mykonos in Greece. Sasha and Digweed played at Twilo on the last Friday of every month, playing sets that lasted between eight and twelve hours. In early 2001, Sasha suffered an ear injury and was unable to play for their last four dates before Twilo was closed by the New York City authorities. Digweed continued to play the time-slot by himself until 6 May 2001, when Twilo was raided by the NYPD and subsequently forced to close down.

Digweed has a cameo of himself playing music in Greg Harrison's 2000 movie Groove, which tells the story of an all-night rave in San Francisco.

In early 2002, Digweed along with Sasha and Jimmy Van M undertook a six-week countrywide tour of the United States called Delta Heavy. The tour was promoted by Clear Channel and attendance reached 85,000. It took place in a variety of venues but was completely self-reliant from a technical point of view; sound, lights, and visual setups were brought along to every gig of the tour. Also in 2002, Digweed curated and compiled the soundtrack to the film Stark Raving Mad.

From September 2000 to January 2011, Digweed hosted a weekly two-hour radio show on Kiss 100 in the UK, in which he played the first hour of music and a guest DJ played the second hour. Beginning in September 2006, his show was available on all three Kiss radio stations. By that time, the show's name had become Transitions, which was also the name of a four-volume series of mix albums by Digweed that was released every six months during 2006–2008. In January 2011, Transitions aired for the last time on Kiss 100, but the show continues to be broadcast online. On 27 December 2019, Transitions aired its 800th episode.

2008 saw Digweed and Sasha reuniting for a Spring Club Tour that once again featured performances all over North America. In 2011, Digweed's music was featured in the film movie adaptation of Irvine Welsh's best-selling novel Irvine Welsh's Ecstasy.

He featured among the top ten artists from 1998 to 2008 and was voted DJ Mag's number 1 DJ in 2001. In 2010, he was voted number 29 in DJ Mag's annual Top 100 DJs vote. In 2013, Digweed was ranked the number 17 best DJ in the world in Resident Advisor's top 100 DJ charts; he was number 43 in June 2016.

John is the brother of 28 times World Clay Shooting Champion George Digweed, MBE.

== Discography ==
=== Compilation albums ===
- 1994: Journeys by DJ Volume 4: Silky Mix (Music Unites)
- 1994: Sasha & John Digweed – Renaissance: The Mix Collection (Renaissance)
- 1995: Renaissance: The Mix Collection Part 2 (Renaissance)
- 1996: Sasha & John Digweed – Northern Exposure (Ministry of Sound)
- 1997: Sasha & John Digweed – Northern Exposure 2 (Ministry of Sound)
- 1998: Global Underground 006: Sydney (Boxed)
- 1999: Sasha & John Digweed – Northern Exposure: Expeditions (INCredible)
- 1999: Global Underground 014: Hong Kong (Boxed)
- 2000: Sasha & John Digweed – Communicate (INCredible) (Billboard 200 No. 149)
- 2001: Global Underground 019: Los Angeles (Boxed)
- 2002: MMII (Bedrock Records) (Billboard Top Electronic Albums No. 7)
- 2003: Stark Raving Mad (soundtrack)|Stark Raving Mad (Thrive Records) (Billboard Electronic No. 9)
- 2004: Layered Sounds (Bedrock Records)
- 2005: fabric 20 (fabric) (Billboard Electronic No. 13)
- 2005: Choice – A Collection of Classics (Azuli Records)
- 2005: Layered Sounds 2 (Bedrock Records)
- 2006: Transitions (Renaissance) (Billboard Electronic No. 16)
- 2007: Transitions Vol. 2 (Renaissance)
- 2007: Transitions Vol. 3 (Renaissance)
- 2008: Transitions Vol. 4 (Renaissance)
- 2008: Bedrock 10: Past Present Future (Bedrock Records)
- 2009: Bedrock Eleven (Bedrock Records)
- 2010: Structures (Bedrock Records)
- 2010: Bedrock Twelve (Bedrock Records)
- 2011: Structures Two (Bedrock Records)
- 2012: Live in Cordoba (Bedrock Records)
- 2012: Bedrock 14 (Bedrock Records)
- 2012: Live in London (Bedrock Records)
- 2013: Live in Slovenia (Bedrock Records)
- 2013: John Digweed & Nick Muir – Versus (Bedrock Records)
- 2013: Live in Argentina (Bedrock Records)
- 2014: Live in Miami (Bedrock Records)
- 2014: Live in Toronto (Bedrock Records)
- 2015: Live in South Beach (Bedrock Records)
- 2016: Live in Montreal (Bedrock Records)
- 2016: Live in Montreal - Finale (Bedrock Records)
- 2016: Bedrock 18 - Signals (Bedrock Records)
- 2017: Live in Brooklyn (Bedrock Records)
- 2018: Bedrock XX (Bedrock Records)
- 2018: Live in Tokyo (Bedrock Records)
- 2019: Last Night at Output (Bedrock Records)
- 2020: Quattro (Bedrock Records)
- 2021: Quattro II (Bedrock Records)
- 2022: Quattro III (Bedrock Records)
- 2023: Futuro (Bedrock Records)
- 2024: Live In Stereo (Bedrock Records)

=== Singles ===
- 1993: Bedrock – "For What You Dream Of" (Stress Records) (UK No. 25)
- 1997: Bedrock – "Set in Stone" / "Forbidden Zone" (Stress Records) (UK No. 71)
- 1999: Bedrock – "Heaven Scent" (Bedrock Records) (UK No. 35)
- 2000: Bedrock – "Voices" (Bedrock Records) (UK No. 44)
- 2001: Bedrock – "Beautiful Strange" (Bedrock Records)
- 2002: Bedrock – "Emerald" (Bedrock Records)
- 2003: Bedrock – "Forge" (Bedrock Breaks)
- 2005: Bedrock – "Santiago" (Bedrock Records)
- 2006: Bedrock – "Warung Beach" (Bedrock Records)
- 2007: John Digweed – "Gridlock" (Renaissance)
- 2009: John Digweed & Nick Muir – "Tangent" (Bedrock Records)
- 2010: John Digweed & Nick Muir – "Satellite / Meteor" (Bedrock Records)
- 2010: John Digweed & Nick Muir – "Satellite / Meteor (Remixes)" (Bedrock Records)

=== DJ Magazine Top 100 rankings ===
- 1997: No. 12 (First year that DJ Mag poll was changed to a readership vote)
- 1998: No. 7 (Up 5)
- 1999: No. 6 (Up 1)
- 2000: No. 3 (Up 3)
- 2001: No. 1 (Up 2)
- 2002: No. 3 (Down 2)
- 2003: No. 5 (Down 2)
- 2004: No. 8 (Down 3)
- 2005: No. 6 (Up 2)
- 2006: No. 8 (Down 2)
- 2007: No. 3 (Up 5)
- 2008: No. 9 (Down 6)
- 2009: No. 17 (Down 8)
- 2010: No. 29 (Down 12)
- 2011: No. 55 (Down 26)
- 2012: No. 98 (Down 43)
- Since 2013: Not on List

=== DVD ===
- Sasha & John Digweed present Delta Heavy (System Recordings)
- A Tale of Two Cities, Live in Argentina 2013 (Bedrock Records & Ourmaninthefield)
- A Tale of Two UK Cities, 2015 (Bedrock Records & Ourmaninthefield)

Awards and achievements
Preceded by Sasha	DJ Magazine Number 1 DJ; 2001	Succeeded by Tiësto
