= Humate =

Humate was until 1996 a German trance group, then just the German record producer Gerret Frerichs, who has released singles with record labels such as MFS and Superstition. His work has been featured on many compilation albums including the Global Underground series, Sasha and John Digweed's Northern Exposure series and the Cafe Del Mar series. Oliver Huntemann and Patrick Kjonberg are former members of Humate.

The reissue of the track, "Love Stimulation" peaked at #18 in the UK singles chart, in January 1999.
