= Xpander (EP) =

EP by Sasha
- Released: 5 July 1999
- Genres: Progressive trance; progressive house; breaks; ambient
- Length: 49:16
- Label: Deconstruction Records
- Producers: Sasha; Charlie May; Andy Page; Gaëtan Schurrer

Sasha chronology
| Global Underground: San Francisco (1998) | Xpander (1999) | Northern Exposure: Expeditions (1999) |

Professional ratings
Review scores
| Source | Rating |
|---|---|
| Allmusic | 3/5 stars |

Xpander is an extended play (EP) by Welsh DJ Sasha. It was released on 5 July 1999 through Deconstruction Records, and features co-production from Charlie May, Andy Page and Gaëtan Schurrer. The EP charted on release, peaking at number 18 on the UK Albums Chart. In 1999, the EP won an award at the International Dance Music Awards for "Best Techno/Trance 12"".

== Background ==
The title track, "Xpander", was featured on compilations such as Global Underground: Ibiza, Pete Tong's Essential Selection, Hooj Choons' Nu Progressive Era, and many other DJ mix compilations. It is considered a seminal release within the trance music community. It was voted the 9th best dance track of all time, by readers of Mixmag. In 2021, the song was ranked #233 in A State of Trance's Top 1000.

The song "Belfunk" was originally created as a remix of Orbital's song "Belfast", but Orbital "hated it" due to it having little-to-no resemblance to the original. A remix of "Belfast" by Sasha and The Light (as opposed to "Belfunk" by Sasha and Charlie May) was released by Orbital that same year.

The title track and the EP were named after the Oberheim Xpander synthesizer, prominently used in the song. The title track was featured in the 1999 racing video game Wipeout 3, the music of which was chosen by Sasha himself. In 2017, an orchestral version of the recording was released as a single, titled "Xpander: Refracted" and saw several live performances.

== Track listing ==
| No. | Title | Writer(s) | Producer(s) | Length |
|---|---|---|---|---|
| 1. | "Xpander" (Edit) | Alexander Coe; Duncan Forbes; Charlie May | Coe; Charlie May | 3:52 |
| 2. | "Xpander" | Coe; Forbes; May | Coe; May | 11:30 |
| 3. | "Belfunk" | Coe; May | Coe; May | 11:08 |
| 4. | "Rabbitweed" | Coe | Coe; Andy Page; Gaëtan Schurrer | 10:23 |
| 5. | "Baja" | Coe | Coe; Page; Schurrer | 12:33 |
| Total length: | | | | 49:16 |

== Accolades ==
| Award | Year | Category | Result |
|---|---|---|---|
| International Dance Music Awards | 1999 | Best Techno/Trance 12" | Won |

== Charts ==
| Chart (1999) | Peak position |
|---|---|
| UK Albums (Official Charts Company) | 18 |
| Irish Albums (IRMA) | 30 |
