= Renaissance (club) =

British electronic dance music club brand

Renaissance is a British electronic dance music club brand and record label. Renaissance was started by Geoff Oakes at Venue 44 in Mansfield, England in March 1992. Renaissance was Geoff Oakes' antidote to the sci-fi imagery and dressed down clubbers of the 'rave' scene. Early resident DJs at Renaissance were Ian Ossia, Sasha, John Digweed and Nigel Dawson; other DJs with long-time attachments include Dave Seaman, Nick Warren, David Morales, Anthony Pappa and Hernán Cattáneo.

In 1993, Renaissance moved to a newly renovated former print works in Derby called The Conservatory. The Conservatory was only just finished in time for opening of Renaissance on the Saturday night but was decorated with the (by then) signature gold cherubs and velvet drapes which have become indicative of the opulent style of Renaissance events. In 1995, Renaissance put on their first international show at Womb in Tokyo. Other international dates soon followed, and in 2007, Renaissance hosted over 150 shows in more than 25 countries around the world. The Renaissance monthly residency at the Cross nightclub in London was one of the longest running continuous club nights in the world, and ended in November 2007 when the venue closed permanently to make way for new development. They are known for their use of classical imagery in their packaging and advertising.

Renaissance is also renowned for their special shows in stately homes and castles, including Shugborough Hall, Allerton Castle, and several others around the UK. In late June 2007, Renaissance hosted "Wild in the Country" at Knebworth House in Hertfordshire. The event featured the only summer appearance in the UK of the electronic band Underworld, as well as a lengthy DJ set by Sasha and John Digweed. Other major artists on the line up included Hot Chip, François K, and Ricardo Villalobos.

Renaissance has also been resident during the summer season in Ibiza for more than 15 years, and has played on the Spanish island in venues such as Pacha, Privilege, and Amnesia.

In early 2010, Renaissance ceased operations and entered into administration. Ministry of Sound acquired the copyrights to the Renaissance brand, although under MOS ownership the brand was not active until recently. In July 2011, original founder Geoff Oakes once again took control of the brand and both the label and events are now fully operational again. A series of special events and record releases to celebrate Renaissance's 20th Anniversary was announced in 2012.

In late 2018, a controlling stake in the promotion and associated record label was acquired by media and finance entrepreneur, Scott Rudmann. Rudmann had been a small shareholder of the company since 2000, was formerly a non-executive director of the company, and had remained close with Geoff Oakes over many years.

Beginning in 2018, Renaissance's event calendar began again, with the promotion staging events in Birmingham, United Kingdom with artists including Tale of Us, Sasha, Dixon, Solomun, and Amelie Lens.

In January 2020, Renaissance made its debut in Tulum, Mexico, at leading Tulum outdoor venue Zamna, with a groundbreaking line up including artists who had ever performed in Tulum previously, among them Adam Beyer, Ida Endberg, Charlotee DeWitte, Danny Tenaglia, Nicole Moudaber, Dubfire, Blancah, and Sirsax. The promotion has announced a return to Zamna, Tulum in January 2021.

== Record label ==
Renaissance has an associated record label which has featured releases from artists such as John Digweed, Sasha, Dave Seaman, Hernan Cattaneo, David Morales, Faithless, Satoshi Tomiie, James Zabiela and BT. Sasha and John Digweed met while resident DJs at Renaissance. Two years into their Renaissance residencies, they produced their first mix album, Renaissance: The Mix Collection, which was released on the club's label 1994. This 3-CD set became the first mix compilation to achieve gold record status.

== See also ==
- List of electronic dance music venues
- Lists of record labels
