= Slacker (producer) =

British electronic music producer

Shem McCauley, known professionally as Slacker, was a British electronic music house, hip hop and R&B producer. He was the DJ for UK Hip Hop band The She Rockers. He owned Jukebox in the Sky record label. He was also known under the names "Head Honcho", "Ramp" "Live It!" and "DJ Streets Ahead". Slacker, who was based in England, had released records on many labels including XL Recordings, Loaded Records, and Perfecto Records.

Shem McCauley died in Bangkok, Thailand, in January 2012.

== Discography ==
=== Album ===
- Start a New Life (2010)

=== Singles ===
List of singles, with selected chart positions
Title	Year	Peak chart positions	
Title	Year	UK	AUS
"Feel Space"	1995	—	—
"Flying"	1996	—	—
"Scared"	1996	36	99
"Your Face"	1997	33	—
"Psychout"	1998	97	—
"Looky Thing"	2002	—	—
"Turning to Air"	2004	—	—

=== Remixes ===
- Was (Not Was) - "Spy in the House of Love (Streetsahead mix)" (1987)
- Blur - "Entertain Me (The Live It! Remix)" (1995)
- The Prodigy – "Smack My Bitch Up" (1998)
- Golden Girls – "Kinetic" (1998)
- Junkie XL – Zerotonine" (1999)
- Bedrock – "Voices" (2000)
- Dave Kane – "Clarkness" (2001)

== Notable collaborators ==
- Norman Cook (aka Fatboy Slim)
- Carl Cox, DJ
- Tim Westwood, BBC Radio 1 DJ, England.
- The Prodigy
