= Twilo =

Former American nightclub

Coordinates: 40°45′2.4″N 74°0′13.8″W

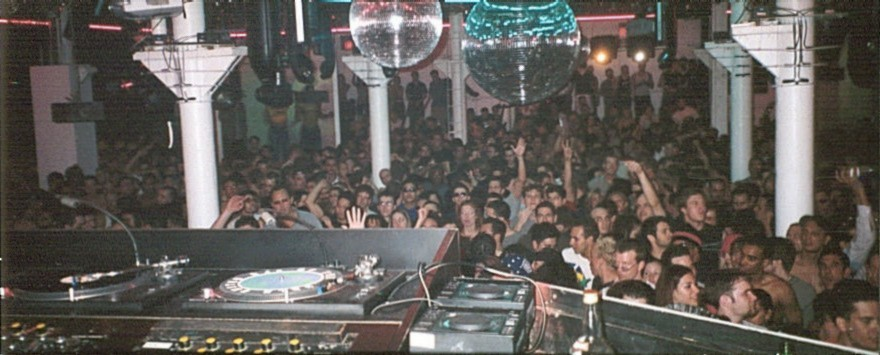
View of the dance floor from the DJ booth

Twilo was an American nightclub in operation from 1995 to 2001 in New York City, and from 2006 to 2007 in Miami. It was located at 532 West 27th Street, in the same building that housed The Sound Factory from 1989 to 1995.

== Closing ==
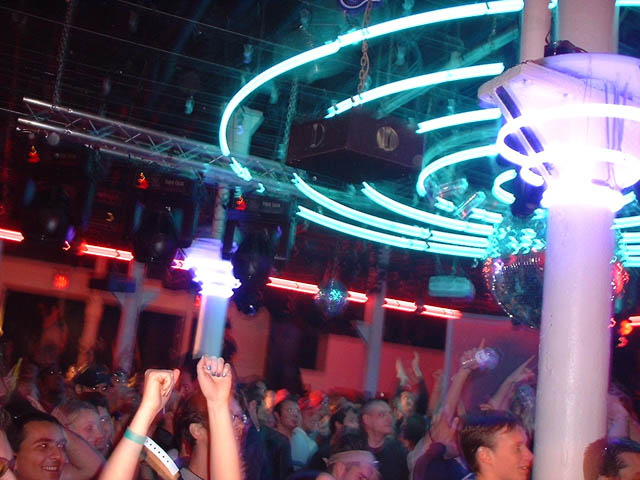
View of the lighting from the dance floor

Twilo had been under pressure to close from then-Mayor Rudy Giuliani ever since the launch of his controversial quality-of-life campaign. Still, the club managed to hold onto its cabaret license until early 2001, when a spate of previous allegations re-surfaced in connection with a claim by city authorities that the club had misused private ambulances to hide victims of drug overdoses. Club management claimed that the ambulance was obtained by recommendation of the city.

The space on West 27th Street was reused as various other nightclubs over the following years, including Spirit and B.E.D., the latter of which shuttered in 2007 shortly after an incident where manager Granville Adams pushed Orlando Valle to his death down the elevator shaft. In 2011, the space was bought by immersive theater company Emursive as the home of Sleep No More in a venue called the McKittrick Hotel.

Twilo was briefly revived for two nights only at its original location in March 2026.
