= Jimmy Van M =

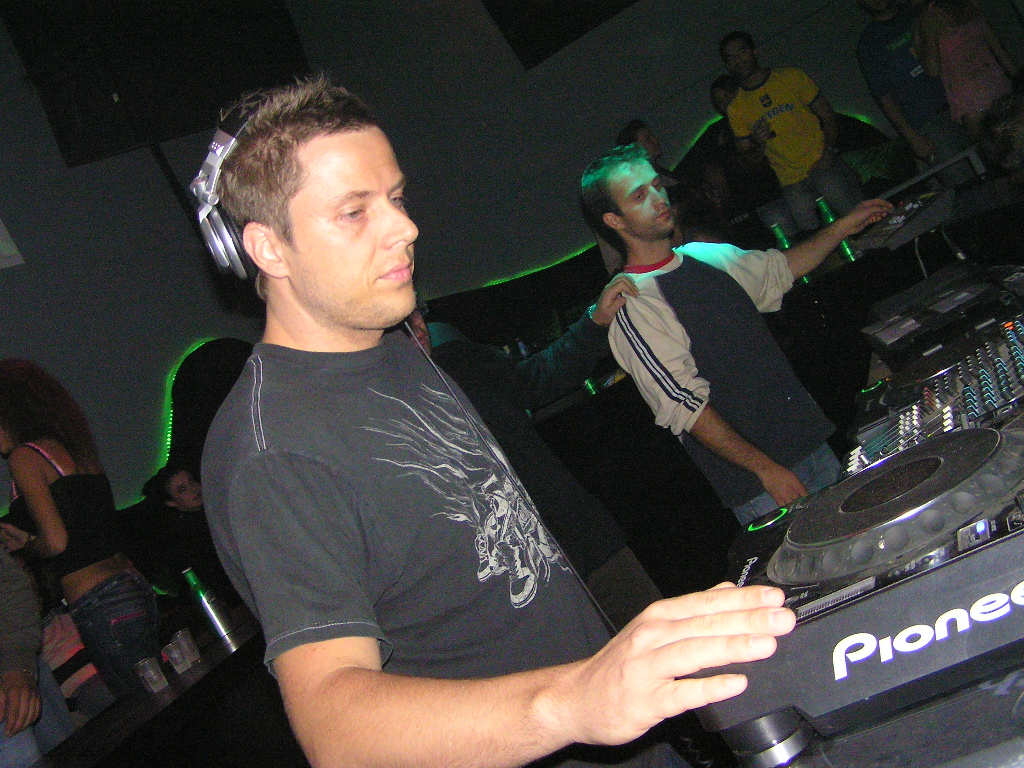
- Jimmy Van M performing at the club Luv

Background information
- Born: James Van Malleghem
- Origin: Ghent, Belgium
- Genres: Downtempo, progressive house
- Occupations: Disc jockey, Record producer, Promoter
- Years active: 1992–present
- Website: https://www.jimmyvanm.com/

Jimmy Van Malleghem, known by his stage name Jimmy Van M, is a Belgian DJ and progressive house and downtempo music producer.

He was a large part of the "Delta Heavy Tour" with Sasha & John Digweed, in addition to performing with many other DJs, such as James Zabiela and Lee Burridge. He has released a few singles as well as mix albums on Ultra Records and Bedrock Records. He is more known for his warm up set than his peak time performances.

Jimmy Van M was born in Belgium, but moved to Orlando, Florida in the United States at age 10. In 1995, he founded the Balance Promote Group, a DJ booking agency and record pool. In 2000, he released his first mix compilation Trance Nation America and followed this up with 2001's Bedrock: Compiled & Mixed album. His third album, Balance 010 of EQ / Stomp's Balance series, is a three disc compilation featuring a "downtempo" disc, a "midtempo" disc, and an "uptempo" disc, with the tempo building throughout the three. The first disc starts at 65 beats per minute and the third ends at 126 beats per minute.
