= Lexicon Avenue =

British electronic music group

- Also known as: Lex Ave, Lexicon Ave, Lexicone Ave
- Origin: Newcastle upon Tyne, England
- Genres: Progressive house, tech house, house, electronica
- Years active: 1997, 2014-present
- Labels: Forensic Records; Saw Recordings; Yoshitoshi
- Members: Scott Bradford; Chris Scott
- Past members: Scott Bradford, Mark Armstrong, and Chris Scott
- Website: Lexicon Avenue

Lexicon Avenue is an electronic music group from Newcastle upon Tyne, consisting of Scott Bradford, Mark Armstrong, and Chris Scott. Their own Forensic record label began with the first Lexicon release, "Here I Am", and with releases and remixes on Satoshi Tomiie's Saw Recordings, Hooj Choons, Renaissance Recordings, Yoshitoshi.

== History ==
Lexicon Avenue have performed in Japan, South America, Portugal, Lithuania, Romania, Croatia, Australia, Singapore, South Korea, Jakarta, Dubai, India, Israel, Norway, Spain, and the United States.

They have released singles on labels including Forensic Records, Saw Recordings and Yoshitoshi. Much of their work has been done as remixes for other artists including Medway, Habersham & Phil K, Dave Gahan and Depeche Mode for whom they remixed the 2003 track "Only When I Lose Myself". They also released an entry in NRK Sound Division's Nite Life series. Aside from Lexicon Avenue, Bradford and Scott partner each other on the New Phunk Theory, Little Green Men and Third Movement projects as well as recording with Satoshi Tomiie as Fishead. Chris Scott also fronts the Echomen and Mooncat projects with Anton Fielding, and have released EPs on the Hooj Choons and The End Recordings labels. Chris Scott was also the producer behind the massive Happy Clappers single "I Believe" which had huge chart success in 1995.
