= PQM =

Australian DJ (1972–2021)

- Born: April 20, 1972; Brooklyn, New York
- Died: March 15, 2021 (aged 48)
- Cause of death: ALS
- Genres: Progressive house, deep house
- Labels: Renaissance, Yoshitoshi
- Formerly of: Nubian Crackers

Manuel Napuri, known professionally as PQM (short for Prince Quick Mix) was an Australian electronic musician and DJ.

== Career ==
Born in Brooklyn, he was a member of the hip-hop group Nubian Crackers and had released records on labels such as Renaissance Recordings and Yoshitoshi Recordings. He was known for his singles, "The Flying Song" and "You Are Sleeping", which have been featured on multiple compilations, such as James Holden's Balance 005 release, Hernan Cattaneo's South America 2CD EP set, and Deep Dish's Global Underground 025: Toronto DJ mix. He also recorded & produced the vocals for Steve Lawler's "Rise In", which reached #50 on the UK Singles chart. He released the track "Nameless", which featured vocals from Pilgrim Soul.

His single "You Are Sleeping" was first released in June 2002. It was released on Yoshitoshi Recordings and featured collaborated remixes with artists such as Luke Chable. It contains an unlicensed sample of poet John Harris's "The Gospel According to John", incorrectly credited as "Hoes Gotta Eat Too" by DJ Xenamorph.

== Illness and death ==
After being diagnosed with ALS in 2018, PQM died on March 15, 2021.
