= Balance (series) =

Compilation album and DJ mix series

Balance Music
- Parent company: EQ Recordings
- Founded: 2001; 25 years ago
- Founder: Tom Pandzic
- Distributor: Warner
- Genre: Progressive house, Progressive breaks
- Country of origin: Australia
- Location: Melbourne
- Official website: https://balancemusic.com.au

Balance is a compilation album and DJ mix series launched in 2000 by Melbourne-based independent record label Balance Music.

== Content ==
Balance's sound has been described as progressive house and progressive breaks. Each issue is mixed by a featured artist and typically comes with two CDs, though certain mixes may be packaged with more discs, such as Balance 007 and 010.

== History ==
Balance Music, a sublabel for EQ Recordings, was founded in 2000 by Tom Pandzic. The Balance series started with Balance 001 mixed by local Australian DJ Sean Quinn and Balance 002 by Kasey Taylor. The series then expanded, featuring international DJs starting with Balance 003 mixed by Bill Hamel. The series garnered attention in 2002, with Balance 004 by Phil K receiving a Dance Music Awards' compilation of the year honor. Released in 2003, Balance 005 by James Holden received critical acclaim and propelled the series further into prominence. Balance 007 became the first compilation to be packaged with three CDs. During the 2010s, Balance Music started the Balance Presents mix series. They have since also held music festivals, with the Croatia festival in 2025 celebrating the label's 25th anniversary.

== Reception ==
Resident Advisor stated that Balance has "arguably become one of the leading mix series in the progressive genre", opining that the series maintained a more consistent standard of quality compared to mixes by Global Underground and Renaissance Recordings and putting Balance 005 and 014 in the top 50 mixes of the 2000s at number 5 and 28 respectively. Similarly, LA Weekly put Balance 014 in the top 10 dance albums, describing it as "edgy, postmodern blur of sampl-adelic art".

== Discography ==
| Title | Artist | Release date | Notes |
|---|---|---|---|
| Balance 001 | Sean Quinn | 6 November 2001 | |
| Balance 002 | Kasey Taylor | 2001 | |
| Balance 003 | Bill Hamel | 22 April 2002 | |
| Balance 004 | Phil K | 14 October 2002 | |
| Balance 005 | James Holden | 6 October 2003 | |
| Balance 006 | Anthony Pappa | 24 May 2004 | |
| Balance 007 | Chris Fortier | April 2005 | |
| Balance 008 | Desyn Masiello | November 2005 | |
| Balance 009 | Paolo Mojo | April 2006 | |
| Balance 010 | Jimmy Van M | October 2006 | |
| Balance 011 | Luke Fair | April 2007 | |
| Balance 012 | Lee Burridge | October 2007 | |
| Balance 013 | SOS | April 2008 | |
| Balance 014 | Joris Voorn | March 2009 | |
| Balance 015 | Will Saul | October 2009 | |
| Balance 016 | Agoria | March 2010 | |
| Balance 017 | Timo Maas | October 2010 | |
| Balance 018 | Nick Warren | April 2011 | |
| Balance 019 | Henry Saiz | 10 June 2011 | |
| Balance 020 | Deetron | November 2011 | |
| Balance 021 | Nic Fanciulli | May 2012 | |
| Balance 022 | Funk D'Void | October 2012 | |
| Balance Presents Jozif | Jozif | February 2013 | |
| Balance 023 | Radio Slave | 10 June 2013 | |
| Balance Presents Guy J | Guy J | July 2013 | |
| Balance 024 | Danny Howells | November 2013 | |
| Balance 025 | Danny Tenaglia | September 2014 | |
| Balance 026 | Hernán Cattáneo | October 2014 | |
| Balance 027 | Magda | February 2015 | |
| Balance Presents Fur Coat | Fur Coat | 18 May 2015 | |
| Balance 028 | Stacey Pullen | November 2015 | |
| Balance 029 | James Zabiela | February 2018 | |
| Balance 030 | Max Cooper | May 2018 | |
| Balance 031 | Tim Green | 5 May 2023 | |
| Balance 032 | Henry Saiz | 17 November 2023 | |

== See also ==
- DJ-Kicks
- In Search of Sunrise
