= Renaissance: Sequential Vol. 2 =

Compilation album by Hernán Cattáneo
- Released: May 11, 2007
- Genre: Progressive House; House
- Label: Renaissance Recordings
- Producer: Hernán Cattáneo; Martin Garcia Engineer

Hernán Cattáneo chronology
Renaissance: Sequential (2006)	Renaissance: Sequential Vol. 2 (2007)

Renaissance: Sequential Vol. 2 is the second release from Hernán Cattáneo's Sequential Series in Renaissance Recordings. A competition was created online to give out signed copies from the compilation.

== Track listing ==
Disc 1
No.	Title	Length
1.	"Blue Foundation - Sweep (Hernán Cattáneo & John Tonks Little Intro Mix)"	2:19
2.	"Crowdpleaser & St. Plomb - 18 Years"	5:28
3.	"Livio & Roby Featuring George G - Monochrome (Reprise) "	4:42
4.	"François DuBois - I Try (Nic Fanciulli Remix) "	3:04
5.	"Hernán Cattáneo & John Tonks - Anime (Sequential Mix) "	5:22
6.	"Xplore - Time Travel"	4:51
7.	"DP6 - Summer Time"	4:05
8.	"Kosmas Epsilon - Paranoid (Eelke Kleijn Remix) "	5:57
9.	"16 Bit Lolitas - Goodbye Pluto"	5:22
10.	"Guy J - Agent Blue"	5:14
11.	"Itamar Sagi - Sparta (Original Mix) "	6:23
12.	"X-Green - In Place Solo"	6:00
13.	"TG - Rhythm Acupuncture (Martin Buttrich Remix) "	4:22
14.	"Chaim Featuring Shy - Popsky"	5:29
15.	"Marco Bailey - Smooth Drive (Danny Howells & Dick Trevor Mix)"	8:02

Disc 2
No.	Title	Length
1.	"Oliverio - The Second Angel Is Here (Sequential Mix)"	4:55
2.	"Spencer Parker - Neon (Guy Gerber & David K Mix)"	3:46
3.	"James Harcourt - Arachnofunk"	4:09
4.	"Steve Mill - Lia"	7:03
5.	"Anil Chawla - Everyone Loves Candy"	3:31
6.	"Layo & Bushwacka! - Saudade (Remix)"	6:55
7.	"Merkins - I Sleep In Sellotape"	4:37
8.	"Martin Eilbahn - Nobody Beats The Biz"	4:35
9.	"Nick Muir - Airtight (Sequential Mix)"	7:49
10.	"Martin Garcia - Paper Dove (Sequential Mix)"	7:36
11.	"Alex Dolby - Prodax"	6:37
12.	"Graham & Blades - Argie Bargie"	7:25
13.	"Stel - Infinity"	8:42

== Reviews ==
Professional ratings
Review scores
Source	Rating
Amazon	4.5/5 stars
Discogs	(4.4/5)
Play	5/5 stars

This is a mix that mirrors Volume 1, beginning on an atmospheric, emotive tip, rising toward more peak-time fare. Along the way, I hope to have captured the aforementioned diversity, alongside a few pleasant surprises and, most importantly, a true reflection of my current sound.

— Hernán Cattáneo.

The album features a two disc house style by Hernán Cattáneo, the compilation features tracks from all over the world, from Scandinavia, Belgium, Germany, Israel, Greece, Argentina, England and the United States. The difference between it and other DJ Mixes is that an intro remix from Hernán Cattáneo and studio team mate John Tonks was included on the first disc, in total there are six exclusive tracks from fellow producers. Between those, Nick Muir's track "Airtight", Oliverio's "The Second Angel Is Here", and Martin Garcia's "Paper Dove" which provided a "(Sequential Mix)", Garcia was the engineer during the production of the album. Other tracks were "Anime", a creation between Cattáneo and Tonks.
