= Renaissance Recordings =

British record label

Renaissance
- Parent company: Renaissance Music
- Founded: 1994
- Founder: Geoff Oakes
- Genre: House, progressive house, tech house, electro house, deep house
- Country of origin: England
- Official website: renaissance.dj

Renaissance Music (formerly called Renaissance Recordings) is a British record label and live events promotion company, founded by the club Renaissance in 1994. It went into administration in September 2010 and the back catalogue was sold to Phoenix Music International Ltd.

In July 2011, after a year of inactivity, it was announced that Renaissance had been reborn, with founder and original owner Geoff Oakes guiding the brand. After a large period of activity, they ceased operations once again on 23 September 2014. In July 2017, they released a new digital remix of Age of Love's song "The Age of Love" by Solomun that went to world No. 1 on the electronic music charts.

In 2018, media and finance entrepreneur Scott Rudmann acquired a majority stake in the label and began working in partnership with Oakes. Renaissance label released a series of remixes of iconic dance music singles in collaboration with some of the world's leading electronic music producers, all of which went to a chart position of No. 1, No. 2, or No. 3. These singles include Cafe del Mar (Tale of Us remix), Bladerunner (Maceo Plex remix), Sacred Cycles (Adam Beyer and Bart Skills remix). [needs to be updated with additional remix list]

Since 2018, the record label has released over forty singles on the main label and new Bauhaus sublabel, with over thirty top ten singles on various Beatport genre lists. The company has arranged and promoted over forty events since 2018, including large scale festival style events in Tulum, Mexico in partnership with Zamna. Renaissance has arranged club nights in over ten countries, including Israel.

In 2024, the operations of the business, catalog, and trademark ownership were acquired in full by Scott Rudmann in a new company named Renaissance Music. Marcus James has been the head of AnR and the lavel operations for twenty years and continues in his role to date.

In October 2024, the label announced that for the first time, its library of over one hundred mixes dating from 1994 would be made available on the Apple Music Dj Mixes platform. The first release 'The Mix Collection; Volume One consists of a three-CD set of three mixes by Sasha (DJ) and John Digweed and was the first album in the history of electronic music to become a gold record with over 100,000 copies sold in 1994. The mixes comprise a three-hour and forty minute electronic music composition, recorded using vinyl records and the most advanced sound technology of the time.

== Sublabels ==
- emFire
- USR (Underground Sound of Renaissance)
- Bauhaus (commenced in January 2023)

== Catalogue ==
=== Series ===
Current

- 3D
- Digital
- Masters Series
- Mix Collections
- Sequential
- Sidetracked
- The Sound of Renaissance
- This Is...
- Transitions
- Viva
- Focus On
- Platform

Discontinued

- Anthems
- Frontiers
- Ibiza
- James Zabiela
- Nic Fanciulli
- Progression
- Silk
- Therapy Sessions
- Worldwide
- Presents...

=== Albums, compilations and DJ mixes ===
Key information	Tag
10 year anniversary re-issue.	Y10
The Masters Series.	#
Studio albums and Long Plays.	LP
Unreleased.	—

No.	Artist	Title	Format	Date	Tag
REN01CD	Dave Seaman	Renaissance: The Masters Series, Part 1: Awakening	2×CD	14 March 2000	1
REN02CD	Deep Dish	Renaissance: The Masters Series, Part 2: Ibiza	2×CD	14 August 2000	2
REN03CD	Various Artists	Renaissance: Progression, Vol. 1	2×CD	14 November 2000	
REN04CD	Dave Seaman	Renaissance: The Masters Series, Part 3: Desire	2×CD	1 May 2001	3
REN05CD	Various Artists	Renaissance: Ibiza 2001	3×CD, Comp	14 July 2001	
REN06CD	Nick Warren & Danny Howells	Renaissance: The Masters Series, Part 4: Revelation	2×CD	14 November 2001	4
REN07CD	Various Artists	Renaissance: Anthems 2002	3×CD, Comp	14 December 2001	
REN08CD	Various Artists	The Sound of Renaissance, Vol. 1	2×CD	20 May 2002	
REN09CD	Marcus James	The Sound of Renaissance, Vol. 2	2×CD	23 June 2003	
REN10CD	Sander Kleinenberg	Everybody	2×CD	20 October 2003	
REN11CD	Hernán Cattáneo	Renaissance: The Masters Series	2×CD	16 February 2004	5
REN12CD	Dave Seaman & Phil K	The Therapy Sessions	2×CD	29 March 2004	
REN13CD					—
REN14CD	Various Artists	Renaissance Presents Pacha Ibiza	3×CD	21 June 2004	
REN15CD	James Zabiela	Renaissance ALiVE	2×CD	2004	
REN16CD	Sander Kleinenberg	This Is Everybody Too	2×CD	27 September 2004	
REN17CD	Sasha & Digweed	Renaissance: The Mix Collection	3×CD	8 November 2004	Y10
REN18CD	Hernán Cattáneo	Renaissance: The Masters Series 2	2×CD	14 February 2005	6
REN19CD	Dave Seaman & Luke Chable	The Therapy Sessions, Vol. 2	2×CD	28 March 2005	
REN20CD	Various Artists	Renaissance Presents Pacha Ibiza, Vol. 2	3×CD	11 July 2005	
REN21CD	James Zabiela	Utilities	2×CD	20 June 2005	
REN22CD	Yousef & Behrouz	Renaissance Presents Frontiers	2×CD	22 August 2005	
REN23CD	Nic Fanciulli	Renaissance Presents Nic Fanciulli	2×CD	19 September 2005	
REN24CD	Satoshi Tomiie	Renaissance: 3D	3×CD	30 January 2006	
REN25CD	Dave Seaman	Renaissance: The Masters Series, Part 7	2×CD	13 March 2006	7
REN26CD	Hernán Cattáneo	Renaissance: Sequential	2×CD	8 May 2006	
REN27CD	John Digweed	Transitions	CD	5 June 2006	
REN28CD	Faithless	Renaissance: 3D	3×CD	10 July 2006	
REN29CD	Various Artists	The Sound of Renaissance, Vol. 3	2×CD	31 July 2006	
REN30CD	Sandy Rivera	Renaissance: The Masters Series, Part 8	2×CD	4 September 2006	8
REN31CD	Nic Fanciulli	Renaissance Presents Nic Fanciulli, Vol. 2	2×CD	23 October 2006	
REN32CD	John Digweed	Transitions 2	CD	29 January 2007	
REN33CD	Satoshi Tomiie	Renaissance: The Masters Series, Part 9	2×CD	12 March 2007	9
REN34CD	Hernán Cattáneo	Renaissance: Sequential, Vol. 2	2×CD	7 May 2007	
REN35CD	Various Artists	The Sound of Renaissance, Vol. 4: Ibiza	2×CD	2007	
REN36CD	Sander Kleinenberg	This is... Sander Kleinenberg	2×CD	30 July 2007	
REN37CD	John Digweed	Transitions 3	CD + CD-ROM	24 September 2007	
REN38CD	Shlomi Aber	State of No One	CD, Album	October 2007	LP
REN39CD	Steve Lawler	Viva London	2×CD	22 October 2007	
REN40CD	Tom Middleton	Renaissance: 3D	2×CD	28 January 2008	
REN41CD	Dave Seaman	Renaissance: The Masters Series, Part 10	2×CD	10 March 2008	10
REN42CD	John Digweed	Transitions 4	CD	14 April 2008	
REN43CD	Steve Lawler	Viva Toronto	2×CD	14 July 2008	
REN44CD	Danny Tenaglia	Futurism	2×CD	8 August 2008	
REN45CD	Danny Howells	Renaissance: The Mix Collection	2×CD	8 September 2008	
REN46CD	Satoshi Tomiie	Renaissance: The Masters Series, Part 11	2×CD	3 November 2008	11
REN47CD	Roger Sanchez	Renaissance: 3D	3×CD	26 January 2009	
REN48CD	James Zabiela	Renaissance: The Masters Series, Part 12	2×CD	23 February 2009	12
REN49CD	Tom Middleton	One More Tune	2×CD	27 April 2009	
REN50CD	Hernán Cattáneo	Renaissance: The Masters Series, Part 13	2×CD	25 May 2009	13
REN51CD	Hercules & Love Affair	Sidetracked	2×CD	13 June 2009	
REN52CD	Christian Smith	Platform	2×CD	7 September 2009	
REN53CD	Dave Seaman	Renaissance: The Masters Series, Part 14	2×CD	28 September 2009	14
REN54CD	M.A.N.D.Y.	Renaissance: The Mix Collection	2×CD	26 October 2009	
REN55CD	Gui Boratto	Renaissance: The Mix Collection	2×CD	15 February 2010	
REN56CD	Paul Woolford	Platform	2×CD	22 March 2010	
REN57CD	James Zabiela	Renaissance: The Masters Series, Part 15: Life	2×CD	19 April 2010	15
REN58CD	Hernán Cattáneo	Renaissance: The Masters Series, Part 16: Parallel	2×CD	5 July 2010	16
REN59CD	La Roux	Sidetracked	1×CD	26 July 2010	
RENEW01CD	Dave Seaman	Renaissance: The Masters Series, Part 17	2×CD	10 October 2011	17
RENEW02CD	Hernán Cattáneo	Renaissance: The Masters Series, Part 18	2×CD	8 October 2012	18
RENEW03CD	Tale of Us	Renaissance: The Mix Collection	2×CD	25 February 2013	
RENEW04CD	Nick Warren	Renaissance: The Masters Series, Part 19	2×CD	21 January 2013	19
RENEW05CD	Francois K	Renaissance: The Masters Series, Part 20	2×CD	22 April 2013	20
RENEW06CD	Tiefschwarz	Renaissance: The Mix Collection	2×CD	8 July 2013	

Mix Collection

- RENMIX1CD Sasha & Digweed – Renaissance: The Mix Collection
  (3×CD) Release Release Date: 14 October 1994
- RENMIX2CD John Digweed – Renaissance: The Mix Collection Part 2
  (3×CD) Release Date: 14 September 1995
- RENMIX3CD Fathers of Sound – Renaissance: The Mix Collection Part 3
  (3×CD) Release Date: 14 May 1996
- RENMIX4CD Dave Seaman & Ian Ossia – Renaissance: The Mix Collection Part 4
  (3×CD) Release Date: 14 October 1996

Digital Mix

- RENDIGMIX1 Paolo Mojo – Renaissance Digital 01
  (File, MP3) Release Date: 3 September 2007

Silk Mix

- S RENAISSANCE 01 Various – The Silk Mix
  (CD) Release Date: 1996

World Wide Mix

- RENWW1CD Dave Seaman & Robert Miles – Renaissance Worldwide: London
  (2×CD) Release Date: 14 April 1997
- RENWW2CD David Morales, Dave Seaman & BT – Renaissance Worldwide: Singapore
  (3×CD) Release Date: 14 October 1997

Presents

- RENUK1CD Ian Ossia & Nigel Dawson – Renaissance Presents... Volume One
  (2×CD) Release Date: 1998
- RENUK2CD Anthony Pappa & Rennie Pilgrem – Renaissance Presents... Volume Two
  (2×CD) Release Date: 1999

Focus On

- RENFOC1 Neil Quigley – Focus On: Renaissance
  (1×CD) Release Date: 7 September 2009 (was never released on CD according to Neil Quigley himself)

=== Vinyl ===
- RENX001 Fathers of Sound Featuring Sharon May Lynn – Water
- RENX001 Sandstorm – The Return of Nothing
- RENX002 BT – Godspeed
- RENX002 Freefall Featuring Jan Johnston – Skydive
- RENX003 Memnon Featuring Seroya – Desire
- RENX004 PQM Featuring Cica – The Flying Song
- RENX005 Human Movement – Love Has Come Again
- RENX006 Luzon – The Baguio Track
- RENX007 H-Two – Release
- RENX007 Polekat – Dancing Queen (You Know What I Mean?)
- RENX008 JSJ – Deep Love 9
- RENX009 Origin – Rage/Refined Intricacy
- RENX010 Science Department – Breathe
- RENX011 Luzon – Underground Sound of Renaissance EP Special Edition
- RENX012 Pure Funk – Elektrik
- RENX013 JSJ – Ghost of You
- RENX014 Angel Moraes – Turn It Up
- RENX015 H-Two Burnin' – Fire
- RENX016 I-Jack – Falling
- RENX016 When Is Dark – The Love You Need (Part 1)
- RENX017 Latoro – Electric Sky
- RENR018 Origin – Killing Me
- RENX019 Trendroid Presents CMPM – Rastafari
- RENX020 The Mud Men – Mud Chant
- RENX021 Sharpside – Belgian Resistance 2004
- RENX022 Montero – Brazilia
- RENX023 21st Century Planet Smashers – Underground Night Music
- RENX024 Randall Jones – Cultural Assertion
- RENX025 Aldrin & Akien – Maybe Tomorrow
- RENX026 Sound Alliance – Instead of ...
- RENX027 Chris Cargo – Cityscape
- RENX028 Bionic Rockers – Code 0320
- RENX029 James Zabiela – Utilities
- RENX030 Montero – Captain Hook
- RENX031 The Skeleton Key – The Conjure
- RENX032 Nic Fanciulli – The Squirreled
- RENX033 PJ Davy – Bollyfella
- RENX034 Phonique – For The Time Being
- RENX035 Last Rhythm – Last Rhythm
- RENX035OMT Last Rhythm – Last Rhythm (Tom Middleton Remodel)
- RENX036 Montero – Hairy Hits
- RENX037 Hernán Cattáneo & John Tonks – Sirocco
- RENX038 Cult 45 – True To Life
- RENX039 Nic Fanciulli – Lucky Heather & Cat Out of The Bag
- RENX040 James Zabiela – Weird Science
- RENX041 Sarah McLeod – He Doesn't Love You
- RENX042 Charlie May vs. Sasha – Seal Clubbing
- RENX043 Shlomi Abe Pres. Bao Crop Duster
- RENX044 Marcella – Stabbing Sally
- RENX045 Blue Foundation – Sweep
- RENX046 Solaris Heights – Vice
- RENX047 Martin Eyerer & Stephan Hinz – The Tucan
- RENX048 James Zabiela – Human
- RENX049 Shlomi Aber Feat. Lemon – Moods
- RENX050 Pete Tong & Superbass – Wonderland
- RENX051 John Digweed – Gridlock
- RENX051DIGHSX John Digweed – Gridlock (Remixes)
- RENX052 Steve Lawler – Courses For Horses
- RENX053 James Zabiela – The Perseverance
- RENX054 Solaris Heights – No Trace
- RENX055 Ralph Falcon – The Dig
- RENX056 Umek – Utopia
- RENX057 Zoo Brazil & Nic Fanciulli – Ide
- RENX058 Future Shock – Tiger Dust
- RENX059 Henry Saiz – Artificial Paradises
- RENX060 Shlomi Aber – State of No One
- RENX061 TG – Creature
- RENX062 Christian Smith & John Selway – Updraft
- RENX063 Andy Chatterley & Clinton Brown – Sabotage
- RENX064 Abyss – Hiccups
- RENX065 James Zabiela – Darkness EP
- RENX066 Sasha vs. Adam Parker – Highlife EP
- RENX067 Dave Seaman – Attack of the Abalones/Wrong Side Business
- RENX068 Tom Middleton – One More Tune
- RENX069 Yousef feat. Derrick Carter – Legacy
- RENX070 Egostereo – Paeonia
- RENX071 Patch Park feat. Joeri Jamison – Threshold
- RENX072 Various Artists – The Neil Quigley EP
- RENX073 Spooky – The Nebula EP
- RENX074 Henry Saiz – Madre Noche EP
- RENX075 Sahar Z & Audio Junkies – Beyond Detroit
- RENX076 Robytek – Tribute To E2-E4 (Sueno Latino)
- RENX077 Yousef feat. Derrick Carter – Legacy (Yousef Terrace Remake)
- RENX077 Solee – Dubtale/Ice
- RENX078 Gui Boratto – Trills
- RENX079 Yousef – Afrika
- RENX080 Gabe & Marcello V.O.R. – Funky Zeit
- RENX081 Jim Rivers – 7 Days
- RENX082 Magitman – All Bets Off
- RENX083 Spooky – Little Bullet
- RENX084 Jack Rose/Bloody Mary – Monaque
- RENX085 Henry Saiz – The Rider EP
