= The Inheritors (album) =

Studio album by James Holden
- Released: 24 June 2013
- Genres: Techno; experimental
- Length: 75:33
- Label: Border Community
- Producer: James Holden

James Holden chronology
The Idiots Are Winning (2006)	The Inheritors (2013)	The Animal Spirits (2017)

The Inheritors is the second studio album by British electronic music producer James Holden, released on 24 June 2013 by Border Community.

Holden had not intended to perform live, but he put together a live show after Thom Yorke requested he support on a North American tour with Atoms for Peace. He recruited drummer Tom Page (of experimental electronic duo Rocketnumbernine and The Memory Band) and has worked with him ever since.

== Critical reception ==
Professional ratings
Aggregate scores
Source	Rating
AnyDecentMusic?	7.7/10
Metacritic	82/100
Review scores
Source	Rating
Exclaim!	9/10
Fact	4/5
Financial Times	4/5 stars
Mixmag	4/5
Mojo	4/5 stars
The Observer	3/5 stars
Pitchfork	8.2/10
Resident Advisor	4.5/5
Uncut	8/10
XLR8R	8/10

Many critics noted a stylistic departure from Holden's debut and praised his innovations within electronic music. The Quietus wrote, "If Holden was already starting to push the boundaries on his debut, The Inheritors is techno music not so much fragmented as smashed into tiny pieces; rocks ground into sand and cast into the ether." Derek Miller of Resident Advisor portrayed the music on the album as experimental.

The Inheritors was named Resident Advisor's album of the year and featured on several other year-end lists, including those of The Quietus, The Wire, Drowned in Sound and Bleep.

== Track listing ==
All tracks are written by James Holden, except where noted.

No.	Title	Length
1.	"Rannoch Dawn"	4:24
2.	"||: A Circle Inside A Circle Inside :||"	6:09
3.	"Renata"	5:56
4.	"The Caterpillar's Intervention" (featuring Etienne Jaumet of Zombie Zombie on saxophone; writers: Holden, Jaumet)	4:03
5.	"Sky Burial"	4:26
6.	"The Illuminations"	3:12
7.	"Inter-City 125"	5:29
8.	"Delabole"	3:43
9.	"Seven Stars"	5:49
10.	"Gone Feral"	6:22
11.	"The Inheritors"	4:53
12.	"Circle of Fifths"	3:02
13.	"Some Respite"	4:30
14.	"Blackpool Late Eighties"	8:38
15.	"Self-Playing Schmaltz"	4:47
