= A Cambodian Spring (soundtrack) =

Soundtrack album by James Holden
- Released: 25 January 2019
- Genre: Electronic music
- Length: 39:05
- Label: Border Community
- Producer: James Holden

James Holden chronology
| The Animal Spirits (2017) | A Cambodian Spring (2019) | Imagine This Is a High Dimensional Space of All Possibilities (2023) |

A Cambodian Spring is a 2019 studio album by British electronic musician James Holden that is a soundtrack to the film of the same name.

== Reception ==
Tom Beedham of Exclaim! rated this album an 8 out of 10, writing that "taken apart from the film, track-to-track, the mix of styles and tones across the soundtrack's different themes can be emotionally jarring and overwhelming" and "without falling back on the instrumental emotional manipulation film scores so frequently default to, Holden simply grounds those scenes of uprise and upheaval with that, foregoing crescendos and tension and simply riding out the moments with sober contemplation". In The Irish Times, Donald Clark reviewed the film A Cambodian Spring and wrote that this soundtrack helps the film "against the odds, justif[y] its place on the big screen". Resident Advisor's Layla Fassa states that this release shows "a subtle side to Holden's sound", allowing Holden to explore other genres than "proggy electronica or psychedelic trance".

== Track listing ==
All songs written by James Holden.

1. "Srey Pov's Theme" – 2:53
2. "Monk's Theme Part I" – 1:28
3. "Downturn (medley)" – 2:19
4. "Solidarity Theme (Villagers)" – 1:34
5. "Monk's Theme II" – 0:52
6. "The Villagers" – 2:00
7. "Disintegration Drone I" – 2:18
8. "Solidarity Theme (Release)" – 3:25
9. "Monk's Theme Part III (Exit)" – 2:24
10. "Reprise" – 1:26
11. "Disintegration Drone II (Torn Cone)" – 5:19
12. "Disintegration Drone III (Death Rattle)" – 3:05
13. "Self-Playing Schmaltz" – 4:46
14. "Srey Prov's Theme (End Credits)" – 5:16

== Personnel ==
- James Holden – modular synth, Prophet 600, Hammond organ, recording, mixing, production
- Darran Anderson – liner notes

== See also ==
- List of 2019 albums
