= Echomen =

Electronic musical group

Echomen is an electronic music production duo, which specialises in progressive house, consisting of Chris Scott and Anton Fielding. They are also known as Mooncat, Unarmed Forces and Time Design.

They have released singles on labels such as Hooj Choons, Forensic Records and Saw Recordings. These singles have received much play from DJs and have been featured on compilations from Global Underground's Nubreed series as well James Zabiela's Sound in Motion. They have also made several guest mix appearances, both together and some individually, on John Digweed's flagship progressive house radio show (today called Transitions) on Kiss FM and Proton Radio.

== Discography ==
- 2000: "Orient"/"One Way" (End Recordings)
- 2001: "Havana"/"Once More" (End Recordings)
- 2001: "Thru 2 You" (Disc 1) (Airtight)
- 2002: "Substance" (Forensic Records)
- 2002: "Truth" (Hooj Choons)
- 2003: "Cure" (Saw Recordings)
- 2003: "Perpetual" (Saw Recordings)
- 2003: "Thru 2 You" (reissue) (Hooj Choons)
- 2004: "Radar" (Forensic Records)
- 2004: "Spirit" (Forensic Records)
- 2005: "Womb" (Forensic Records)
- 2006: "Rain" (Dot Com Recordings)
- 2008: "Estella" (Forensic Records)
- 2010: "Cylo" (MCGroove Records)
- 2012: "Satellites" (Mesmeric Records)
- 2013: "Don't Hold Back" ft. Mark Nigrelli (Saw Recordings)
- 2014: "Fission" (Alola Records)
- 2014: Omid 16B "On The Outside" (Echomen remix) (SexOnWax Records)
