= 2002 (disambiguation) =

2002 was a common year starting on Tuesday of the Gregorian calendar.

2002 may also refer to:

== Albums ==
- 2002 (Tha Dogg Pound album)
- 2002 (Gary album)
- 2002 (Brazzaville album)
- Cusco 2002, an album by the German New Age band Cusco
- MMII (album), a DJ mix by John Digweed

== Other uses ==
- 2002 (band)
- "2002" (song), a 2018 song by English singer Anne-Marie
- 2002 (film), a Hong Kong science fiction film
- BMW 2002, a range of cars produced by the automaker
- Prefix used for the 6to4 IPv6 transition mechanism
