= Renaissance: The Masters Series, Part 9 =

The Masters Series, Part 9

Compilation album by Satoshi Tomiie
- Released: March 12, 2007
- Genre: Minimal; House; Tech House
- Length: 2:29:20
- Label: Renaissance Recordings
- Producer: Satoshi Tomiie

Satoshi Tomiie chronology
Renaissance: The Masters Series, Part 8 (2006)	The Masters Series, Part 9 (2007)	Renaissance: The Masters Series, Part 10 (2008)

Renaissance: The Masters Series, Part 9 is the ninth installment from the Masters Series from Renaissance Recordings mixed by Satoshi Tomiie. A competition was also created to give away signed copies from the compilation to promote Tomiie as an artist as well as the label itself. Other promotions included a world wide tour of Tommie and the Masters Series. The compilation was featured as number 6 in the "Textura 2007 TOP 20 Compilations/Mixes".

== Track listing ==
Disc 1
No.	Title	Length
1.	"Ripperton - Farra"	5:12
2.	"Bot'Ox Meets Showgirls - The 16th Machine"	6:45
3.	"Phonogenic - Air Moves (Freestyle Man Discotronix Mix)"	4:56
4.	"Jimpster - Don't Push It"	4:56
5.	"King Roc - Welcome To Zion"	6:30
6.	"Vernon - Don't Be Lonely (An2 Remix)"	6:45
7.	"Nick Chacona - The Right Wing"	7:48
8.	"Opus Ink - Darkroomboot (Sasse Elkatronix Rework)"	5:43
9.	"Herlihy & Torrance - So That's What Happens"	7:22
10.	"DJ Yellow & King Britt - Alienation 3 - Beyond The Forest"	6:08
11.	"Jim Rivers - I Go Deep"	5:35
12.	"Art of Tones - Praise (Llorca Remix)"	4:57
13.	"Motorcitysoul - Aura (Jimpster Mix)"	6:32

Disc 2
No.	Title	Length
1.	"Thugfucker - Ahh (D'Julz Remix)"	5:28
2.	"Marc Romboy vs. Robert Owens - I Need (DJ Fex Fexperimented Mix)"	5:50
3.	"Matt O'Brien - Serotone (Radioslave's Panorama Garage Remix)"	6:36
4.	"Lance De Sardi - Lose Control"	5:35
5.	"Planet Funk - It's Your Time (Different Gear Remix)"	6:36
6.	"Shlomi Aber Feat. Lemon - Moods"	5:35
7.	"Pablo Akaros - Celofans"	8:22
8.	"D'Julz - Flick It"	5:20
9.	"Guy Gerber & Patrik K - Sleeping In The Bass Box"	7:37
10.	"Shlomi Aber Pres. Bao - Crop Duster"	6:51
11.	"Estroe - Driven"	6:11

== Reviews ==
Professional ratings
Review scores
Source	Rating
Amazon	4/5 stars
Clubbing Magazine	6/10 stars
Discogs	4/5 stars
In The Mix	5/5 stars

I really wanted to create an accurate portrayal of my club sets; I felt it important that the segue throughout each disc worked, almost as if they were two seventy-minute songs in their own right.

— Satoshi Tomiie.

The album features a two disc electro house style by Satoshi Tomiie, his latest effort from mixing the 3D compilation on Renaissance aimed at music for home, club and studio; unlike other DJ Mixes the Masters Series are meant to be only for clubs. The first disc features a precise measured set that is as clean as the second disc is dark and moody. The discs contain a variety of strings with funked-up basslines creating a distinctly mellow feel. The cd can be easily compared to the style of Danny Howells, with a warm house feel and funky progressive sounds. The second is techier, more energetic and dance floor oriented, but definitely not trivial. The best tracks that confirm this are the fabulous remixes of ‘I Need’ and ‘It’s Your Time’, together with the last three numbers on the album. Disc two shows a darker view with more noise including artists like King Britt, DJ Yellow and D'Julz, as well as Radioslave, Aber, Shlomi and Jim Rivers. It also features Tomiie's Opus Ink co-production with Audiofly. The artwork on the front cover of the album shows a mysterious confusion and abstract nature of the music inside the cd. The disc has an energetic and dance floor oriented feel with tracks like "I Need" and "It's Your Time", including the closing tracks; Guy Gerber & Patrik K's "Sleeping In The Bass Box", Shlomi Aber which presents Bao with "Crop Duster" and Estroe's track "Driven".
