= Renaissance: The Masters Series, Part 10 =

The Masters Series, Part 10

Compilation album by Dave Seaman
- Released: March 10, 2008
- Genre: Progressive House; Tech House
- Length: 02.9:55
- Label: Renaissance Recordings
- Producer: Dave Seaman

Dave Seaman chronology
Renaissance: The Masters Series, Part 9 (2007)	The Masters Series, Part 10 (2008)	Renaissance: The Masters series, Part 11 (2009)

Renaissance: The Masters Series, Part 10 is the tenth installment from the Masters Series from Renaissance Recordings mixed by Dave Seaman. The release is supported by an extensive touring schedule, to create awareness of the product in all the major territories, the tour is consistent with the artwork from the album to create an authentic Renaissance feel in the clubs. The Masters Series is one of the most famous compilation series in the dance music industry like Global Underground, with Seaman's contributions to series they have collectively sold over 130,000 copies globally.

== Track listing ==
Disc 1
No.	Title	Length
1.	"Apparat - Not A Number"	2:04
2.	"Fairmont - I Need Medicine"	2:04
3.	"Dusty Kid - Cowboys"	4:53
4.	"Wally López - Go Ahead (Patric La Funk Mix)"	2:26
5.	"Peter Edison & George Skanderberg - Patterns of Thought"	4:21
6.	"Gui Boratto - Mr. Decay (Robert Babicz Universum Disco Mix)"	4:59
7.	"Stel - Godthab"	4:05
8.	"Christian Fischer - Karatschai Lake"	3:33
9.	"Joe T. Vannelli - Harlem (Mark Knight Dub)"	4:19
10.	"Skylark - Escalator"	3:40
11.	"Eelke Kleijn - It All Comes Together / Couture Feat. Rachelle - Afterglow (Acapella)"	6:10
12.	"Sennh - I Am With You"	5:02
13.	"Sasha - Who Killed Sparky?"	6:53
14.	"MOS - Waterhølle"	5:04
15.	"Underworld - Beautiful Burnout (Mark Knight Remix)"	6:22

Disc 2
No.	Title	Length
1.	"Johannes - Heil The Coming"	1:28
2.	"Tim Deluxe Feat. Sam Obernik - You Got Tha Touch (Martin Buttrich Vox Mix)"	5:15
3.	"Mugwump - Memory Lane Refund (Acid Retraxion Mix)"	5:07
4.	"Groove Garcia - Trip To Amaltea"	4:51
5.	"Solomun - Deadman"	3:34
6.	"Sol & Grimm - Exuma"	8:07
7.	"Josh Gabriel - Azora"	4:17
8.	"Popof & Nina - Blablabla"	4:32
9.	"Popof - Brain On The Side"	3:00
10.	"Jamie Stevens - Keep Her Space"	5:45
11.	"Oliver Huntemann - Bakery / Meat Katie & D. Ramirez Feat. Odissi - Stop The Revolution (Dubfire's Arrowhead Dub) [Acapella]"	4:29
12.	"Rekorder - Rekorder 10.2"	2:14
13.	"Solaris Heights - No Trace (Popof Remix)"	5:35
14.	"Umek - Faithful Nights"	5:40

== Reviews ==
Professional ratings
Review scores
Source	Rating
Amazon	4.5/5 stars
3D World Magazine	9/10 stars
Wiki Music	5/5 stars

I’ve always viewed the Masters Series as a lasting snapshot of the very best the scene has to offer at that time; Getting the balance right is never an easy task, so it’s always a long, hard process, but that only serves to make the end result more rewarding. As ever, my greatest hope is the fans and all who listen to it enjoy it too.

— Dave Seaman.

The album features a two disc electro house style by Dave Seaman, with smooth transitions and deep bass from artists like Fairmont, Gui Boratto, Wally López, Samim, Sasha, MOS and Underworld, which show his growing electronic style since his "Therapy Sessions". The album begins with the bass monster of Apparat's - "Not A Number", with the keyboards tones like those from The Doors that blend in with the atmosphere of the keyboard synth from Fairmont & Dusty Kid's "Cowboys". Later Wally López's is included with Patric La Funk’s remix which standsout with hazy tech edges with a solid beat. Seaman changes his style into more tech, with the likes of Gui Boratto, Stel and Christian Fischer making the sound more minimal house. Skylark’s track "Elevator" combines progressive house with disco, tech house and tribal. The entrance of disc two with Johannes Heil's "The Coming" is a piece including tribal drumbeats compounding slowly, followed by synth-and-bass lines of Tim Deluxe's "You Got Tha Touch (Martin Buttrich Vox Mix)" with smooth beats interlaced and funked-up vocals which rise to high pitch sounds increasing and later fading melodically. Later he mixes Mugwump with "Memory Lane Refund (Acid Retraxion Mix)" with tech funk and later ranging to sounds from Solumun's moody song "Deadman", Sol & Grimm's "Exuma" and Josh Gabriel's recent track "Azora" which will be featured in his first solo album since the separation of Gabriel & Dresden in 2008. Seaman also includes three works from Popof, his collaboration with Nina on "Blablabla", his track "Brain On The Side" and a remix of Solaris Heights' "No Trace". Seaman's mash-up of Oliver Huntemann's "Bakery" with Meat Katie & D. Rameriz's "Stop The Revolution (Dubfire Mix)" changed the style of the compilation into more epic sci-fi deep leading progressive sounds similar to those from Nubreed 001. The compilation finishes with Umek's "Faithfull Nights" track which sounds like techno-trance from the late 90s.
