= The Universe Will Take Care of You =

Studio album by Holden & Zimpel
- Released: 13 June 2025
- Recorded: July–September 2022
- Length: 50:36
- Label: Border Community

Holden & Zimpel chronology
Imagine This Is a High Dimensional Space of All Possibilities (2023)	The Universe Will Take Care of You (2025)

The Universe Will Take Care of You is a collaborative studio album by English composer James Holden and Polish avant-garde jazz clarinetist Waclaw Zimpel, under the alias Holden & Zimpel. It was released on 13 June 2025 via Border Community Recordings in LP, CD and digital formats. The album was recorded from July to September 2022.

== Reception ==
Professional ratings
Review scores
Source	Rating
Clash	8/10
Jazzwise	4/5 stars
Le Devoir	3/5 stars
The Line of Best Fit	8/10
Pitchfork	8.0/10
PopMatters	8/10
Uncut	8/10 stars

In a three-star review for Le Devoir, Philippe Renaud remarked, "Clarinet manipulated by electronic effects, heterogeneous percussion, keyboards vintage, we imagine the duo seizing everything that was lying around in the studio to give free rein to their instinct and the fantasy that emerges from these jam sessions."

René Passet of Oor observed that the album encompasses "sliding tones that last thirty seconds, colorful fountains of arpeggios from modular synthesizers and crazy time signatures." Writing for the Quietus, Jared Dix stated, it "gazes out into the void until a chord pattern begins to resound, strengthening as it repeats, returning us to the hum of the universal choir." The album received a four-star rating from Jazzwise reviewer Nick Hasted, who opined, it "covers shared ground from minimalism to Moroccan Gnawa, and Zimpel's absorption of Carnatic music as part of Indo jazz fusion band Saagara."

In a review for Uncut, Sharon O'Connell described it as "accordingly freeform and exultant" and "nuanced in its trippy, kosmische inclinations and broad-spectrum in its impact." Clash's Nick Roseblade noted it as "a delightful album" with "strong melodies", "great tones" and "the overall feeling of togetherness and optimism." Ray Honeybourne of the Line of Best Fit remarked, "There is considerable range here, yet there is also so much nuance on what is a challenging and simultaneously rewarding record." PopMatters reviewer J. Simpson referred to it as "a sprawling, heady, hypnotic 50-minute odyssey that falls somewhere between raga, gamelan, new age, and an Atari 2600 murmuring itself to sleep." The album received a rating of 8/10 from Uncut, Clash, the Line of Best Fit and PopMatters.

It was given a 8.0 score by Pitchfork, whose reviewer Philip Sherburne called it an album that "feels bigger and more consequential in every way, folding more ideas, intensities, moods, and dimensions into its freeform sprawl."

== Track listing ==
The Universe Will Take Care of You track listing
No.	Title	Length
1.	"You Are Gods"	8:30
2.	"Sunbeam Path"	9:19
3.	"Time Ring Rattles"	5:56
4.	"Sparkles, Crystals, Miracles"	9:46
5.	"Incredible Bliss"	7:04
6.	"The Universe Will Take Care of You"	10:01
Total length:		50:36
