= Flash Brothers =

Israeli electronic music duo

The Flash Brothers are a group of Israeli brothers who produce electronic music, mostly house or progressive trance. The group consists of Ruven, Ilan, and Shmuel Flaishler. They have featured releases on labels such as Hooj Choons, Silver Planet, and Bedrock Records.

They gained their first publicity in 1997 after they were signed to Agnosia Records, and gained further exposure after their track "Protect the Sense" was part of John Digweed's MMII. Their first full vocal track was 2004's "Amen".

In 2004, they released Fear of a Silver Planet Vol. 2, a sequel to James Holden's mix on Silver Planet Recordings. The Flash Brothers also work closely with Holden.
