= Toolroom Knights (Gabriel & Dresden album) =

Compilation album by Gabriel & Dresden
- Released: October 22, 2007
- Genre: Electronic; house; electro; progressive house
- Label: Toolroom
- Producer: Gabriel & Dresden

Toolroom Knights is the second release of Toolroom Records mixed by Gabriel & Dresden.

This compilation includes the collaboration of many artists. It includes the remix of the Killers' "Read My Mind" and the hit by D. Ramirez & Mark Knight, "Colombian Soul".

== Toolroom Knights (Mixed By Gabriel & Dresden) ==
CD 1

1. Intro
2. Junior Boys - In The Morning (Hot Chip Remix)
3. Above & Beyond - Good For Me (King Roc Dub Mix)
4. Claude VonStroke - Who's Afraid Of Detroit?
5. The Knife - Like A Pen (Thomas Schumacher Remix)
6. D. Ramirez & Mark Knight - Colombian Soul (Gabriel & Dresden Reconstruction)
7. Stephan Bodzin - Fahrenheit
8. The Egg - Nothing (Dusty Kid Loves Rock Mix)
9. Josh Gabriel - Crosstalk
10. Özgür Can - 84 Shots
11. Gabriel & Dresden Feat. Molly Bancroft - Tracking Treasure Down (Wippenberg 128 Mix)
12. Merkins - Nesk
13. Trentemoller - Moan (Trentemoller Remix)

CD 2

1. Intro
2. Monochrome - Pearl (Gabriel & Dresden Thirst Remix)
3. Shlomi Aber & Itamar Sagi - Blonda
4. Eyerer & Namito - Quipa (Etienne De Crecy Remix)
5. James Holden vs Christopher Norman Feat. 3pm - A Break In The Clouds / Turn On The Lights (Acappella)
6. Gabriel & Dresden & Scarlett Etienne - Eleven
7. Dubfire - Roadkill
8. Gabriel & Dresden Feat. Jan Burton - Enemy (Gabriel & Dresden 2007 Remix)
9. Dusty Kid - Tsunamy
10. The Killers - Read My Mind (Gabriel & Dresden Unplugged Mix)
11. Josh Gabriel - Summit
12. 68 Beats - Replay The Night (Gabriel & Dresden Remix)
13. Mark Knight & Dave Spoon - Sylo
14. Apparat - Fractales, Pt. 1
