= Transitions Vol. 2 =

Compilation album by John Digweed
- Released: 29 January 2007
- Genre: Electronic
- Length: 1:12:00
- Label: Renaissance
- Producer: John Digweed

John Digweed chronology
Transitions (2006)	Transitions Vol. 2 (2007)	Transitions Vol. 3 (2007)

Professional ratings
Review scores
Source	Rating
AllMusic	3.5/5 stars
Resident Advisor	4/5 stars

Transitions Volume 2 is a DJ mix compilation album of tech house music by John Digweed, released by Renaissance Records.

== Track listing ==
1. Abyss - "Mind Games (Digweed Cheeky Edit)" (3:37)
2. Abyss - "The Dreamer" (5:24)
3. Chaim EP - "Dana (Guy Gerber Mix)" (5:35)
4. Antena - "Camino del Sol (Joakim Remix)" (8:20)
5. Williams - "The Shivering (Pitch and Hold in Camera Obscura Remix)" (6:46)
6. Evil Hinko - "Gedankenhochsprung (Babicz Remix)" (4:49)
7. Bruce Aisher & G-Stylz - "Belong to Me (Dub - Digweed Cheeky Edit)" (3:02)
8. David K - "Boul de Nerf" (5:35)
9. Felix Houzer - "Mandolina" (5:17)
10. Dirk Technic - "I Love You (Smallboy Remix)" (6:34)
11. Guy Gerber - "Digital Memories" (3:00)
12. Bruce Aisher & G-Stylz - "Can't Get Enough" (4:04)
13. Dose3 - "Minds (Toby Neumann Mix)" (3:41)
14. Jackmate - "Manray (Digweed Cheeky Edit)" (6:10)
