= Andy Horsfield =

British entrepreneur

Andy Horsfield is a British entrepreneur best known for founding Global Underground in 1996. In 2007 the record label was partially acquired by Ministry of Sound and Horsfield remained as head of the company. In 2008 he partnered with James Palumbo to start MOSHK America. Horsfield became the president of Ministry of Sound and Hed Kandi for the US, Canada, and Mexico. In 2008 Ministry of Sound America released "Let Me Think About It", the longest running track on the Top 50 Dance Airplay chart and one of Horsfield's first achievements as President of Ministry of Sound America. He also owns Ruthless Entertainment, an Entertainment and New Tech company based in Singapore.

== See also ==
- Hot Dance Airplay
