= Fabric 21 =

Compilation album by DJ Heather
- Released: March 2005
- Genre: Electronic
- Length: 73:47
- Label: Fabric
- Producer: DJ Heather

Fabric Mix Series chronology
| Fabric 20 (2005) | Fabric 21 (2005) | Fabric 22 (2005) |

Professional ratings
Review scores
| Source | Rating |
|---|---|
| About.com | 4/5 stars |
| Allmusic | 2.5/5 stars |
| JIVE | 5/5 stars |
| Resident Advisor | 3.5/5 stars |
| Tiny Mix Tapes | 1.5/5 stars |

Fabric 21 is a DJ mix compilation album by DJ Heather, as part of the Fabric Mix Series.

== Track listing ==
1. Marko Militano - Good People (Dub) - Bananza Music
2. 2 Or More - I Got Your Love - Bombay Records
3. D'Julz - Ze Theme - 2020 Recordings
4. Mario Fabriani - Release - Nightshift Recordings
5. Mr. Hall Lee - Jump To The Funk - Cadang Recordings
6. DJ Mes - Back To The Program - Blackcherry Recordings
7. 2 Utes - Bumpin The BQE (2-Utes Massive Mix) - Abitare
8. Olivier Desmet - Just Like Heaven - Amenti Music
9. Kaskade - Steppin' Out (Member's Only Mix) - Om Records
10. Mike Delgado - Byrdman's Revenge - Henry Street Music
11. Mike Delgado - Antonio's Groove - Kenlou Records
12. Justin Martin - Snow Day (JT Donaldson Remix) - Utensil Recordings
13. C Pen - Puffin Stuff (JT's Flashback Rework) - Utensil Recordings
14. Magik Johnson feat. Sandy Mill - Feel Alright (Dub Mix) - NRK Music
15. Maxx Renn - Acid Jack (Original Mix) - Jamayka Recordings
16. DJ Rhythm - Brazilian Soul (The Jazzy Joint Mix) - Deep Touch
17. Joey Youngman - Memories - Freaked Records
18. Overtone - Cat's Eyes - Kushi Music
