= The Animal Spirits (James Holden album) =

Studio album by James Holden and the Animal Spirit
- Released: 3 November 2017
- Recorded: mid-2016
- Studios: Sacred Walls, London, England, United Kingdom
- Genres: Electronic; jazz
- Length: 48:38
- Label: Border Community
- Producer: James Holden

James Holden and the Animal Spirit chronology
| The Inheritors (2013) | The Animal Spirits (2017) | A Cambodian Spring (2019) |

The Animal Spirits is a 2017 studio album by British electronic musician James Holden. It features the musician performing jazz-influenced music with a live band, in a break from his usual studio work and has received positive reviews from critics for this experimentation.

== Reception ==
Professional ratings
Aggregate scores
| Source | Rating |
|---|---|
| AnyDecentMusic? | 7.7/10 |
| Metacritic | 81/100 |
Review scores
| Source | Rating |
| AllMusic | 4/5 stars |
| Exclaim! | 8/10 |
| The Financial Times | 4/5 stars |
| The Guardian | 3/5 stars |
| The Line of Best Fit | 8/10 |
| The Observer | 3/5 stars |
| Pitchfork | 7.4/10 |
| Record Collector | 4/5 stars |
| The Skinny | 5/5 stars |

Editors at AnyDecentMusic? scored this album a 7.7 out of 10, aggregating 17 reviews. According to the review aggregator Metacritic, The Animal Spirits received "universal acclaim" based on a weighted average score of 81 out of 100 from 15 critic scores.

Editors at AllMusic rated this album 4 out of 5 stars, with critic Liam Martin writing that "each track contain enough creative vitality to grow into unique forms" and that the music "feels very organic, brought about by the spontaneity of the performances, the brief window of time in which it was recorded, and Holden's own evolutionary arc". In Exclaim!, Daniel Sylvester gave this album an 8 out of 10 for being a "gorgeous, absorbing and wonderfully unkempt mix of psych, jazz, folk and electronic to infiltrate the listener's psyche". Ludovic Hunter-Tilney of The Financial Times rated it 4 out of 5 stars, calling it "an impressive testament to Holden’s artistic restlessness" and praising Holden's choice to use a full band for this album. John Lewis of The Guardian gave this album 3 out of 5 stars, favorably comparing this work to Alice Coltrane, but critiquing Etienne Jaumet's saxophone playing. At The Line of Best Fit, Janne Oinonen rated The Animal Spirits 8 out of 10, stating that "it says something of the success of Holden's new approach that the tracks where the ensemble is more subdued are the least effective" and calling this a "triumph" that is "simultaneously more overtly experimental yet more easily accessible" than most of Holden's work. Loud and Quiet's Sam Walton rated this release a 9 out of 10, characterizing it as "50 minutes of undeniably chopsy playing" that has "the emotive range of Holden’s compositions that lend the album its lasting appeal beyond knockabout jam-band fun".

Emily Mackay of The Observer gave this album 3 out of 5 stars, calling it "a giddy maelstrom of cosmic prog, krautrock, techno and psych-folk". Chal Raven's review for Pitchfork scored The Animal Spirits a 7.4 out of 10, calling this "colossal" leap from Holden's earlier work, leaving him "now a bandleader of a live ensemble rather than a solitary synth programmer, [so] he has opened the door to an entirely different sort of career for himself, one where concerns for the dancefloor shrink away to nothing, and the possibilities of repetition are infinite". Editors of The Quietus chose this for Album of the Week and critic Anna Wood called it "brilliant" for melding jazz and rave music, calling it "quite a feat to create something so universal, something that uses so many influences to push outside of time and place, without erasing any of the specifics". In Record Collector, Alex Neilson scored this release 4 out of 5 stars, stating that it "sticks to a broadly similar blueprint [as Holden's previous work] – kaleidoscopic electronics, abstract tonescapes and ethnographic samples – but this album owes more to cosmic jazz than its Pagan Britain-inspired predecessor". Paul Clarke of Resident Advisor called this "as close as [Holden has] come to transcendence". In a five-star review for The Skinny, Corrie Innes called this album "a dizzying, immersive work which blends natural and synthetic sounds together – shot through with jazz and Moroccan influences – to create a cinematic world that’s as expansive and diverse as it is terse and claustrophobic, and it's stunning". For Spin, Andy Cush wrote that The Animal Spirits is "a remarkable album, both in its hybridized acoustic-electric sonics and its atmosphere of communal celebration".

== Track listing ==
All songs written by James Holden, except where noted.

1. "Incantation for Inanimate Object" – 1:42
2. "Spinning Dance" (Liza Bec and Holden) – 5:30
3. "Pass Through the Fire" – 6:26
4. "Each Moment Like the First" – 4:57
5. "5 The Beginning & End of the World" – 6:40
6. "Thunder Moon Gathering" (Marcus Hamblett and Holden) – 7:28
7. "The Animal Spirits" – 5:38
8. "The Neverending" – 4:30
9. "Go Gladly into the Earth" (Etienne Jaumet) – 5:52

== Personnel ==
"Incantation for Inanimate Object"

- Reef Caribbean – vocals
- James Holden – percussion, modular synth, vocals
- Gemma Sheppard – percussion, vocals

"Spinning Dance"

- Liza Bec – recorder
- Reef Caribbean – vocals
- Lascelle Gordon – percussion
- James Holden – modular synth, vocals
- Tom Page – drums

"Pass Through the Fire"

- Marcus Hamblett – cornet
- James Holden – modular synth
- Etienne Jaumet – saxophone
- Tom Page – drums

"Each Moment Like the First"

- James Holden – modular synth
- Tom Page – drums

"The Beginning & End of the World"

- Lascelle Gordon – percussion
- Marcus Hamblett – cornet
- James Holden – modular synth
- Etienne Jaumet – saxophone
- Tom Page – drums

"Thunder Moon Gathering"

- Liza Bec – Ghaita mizmar
- Lascelle Gordon – percussion
- James Holden – modular synth
- Etienne Jaumet – saxophone
- Tom Page – drums

"The Animal Spirits"

- Liza Bec – Tenore recorder
- Lascelle Gordon – percussion
- James Holden – modular synth
- Etienne Jaumet – saxophone
- Tom Page – drums

"The Neverending"

- Marcus Hamblett – cornet
- James Holden – modular synth
- Etienne Jaumet – saxophone
- Tom Page – drums

"Go Gladly into the Earth"

- Marcus Hamblett – cornet
- James Holden – modular synth
- Etienne Jaumet – saxophone
- Tom Page – drums

Technical personnel

- Jack Featherstone – layout
- James Holden – recording, mixing, production, art direction
- Eric James – mastering at Philosophers Barn Mastering
- Katherine Mager – photography
- Gemma Sheppard – art direction

== See also ==
- List of 2017 albums
