= Fabric 20 =

Compilation album by John Digweed
- Released: 17 January 2005
- Genre: Electronic
- Length: 71:00
- Label: Fabric
- Producer: John Digweed

Fabric Mix Series chronology
Fabric 19 (2004)	Fabric 20 (2005)	Fabric 21 (2005)

John Digweed chronology
MMII (2002)	Fabric 20 (2005)	Transitions (2006)

Professional ratings
Review scores
Source	Rating
365mag	link
About.com	link
Allmusic	link
Exclaim!	Mixed link
Jive	link
PopMatters	link
Pitchfork Media	6.9/10 link
Prefix Magazine	link
Resident Advisor	link

Fabric 20 is a DJ mix compilation album by John Digweed, as part of the Fabric Mix Series. It was whittled down from a five-hour set based on Digweed's time at Fabric.

== Genre ==
Fabric 20 is more similar to Digweed's Kiss FM radio show, rather than his previous progressive and house mixes. The first half is punctuated with a techy, electro vibe. The second half of the set features more of Digweed's uplifting sound that helped make him and Sasha a global phenomenon in the late 1990s.

== Critical reaction ==
Many fans have commented that Digweed is "too commercial" or mainstream for an entry in the Fabric series. It received generally positive reviews, but some critics such as Pitchfork Media found the mix to be nothing particularly special.

== Track listing ==
1. Pete Moss - Strive To Live (16b Mix) - Alola Records
2. Adam Johnson - Traber - Merck/Narita
3. Repair - Forgive + Forget (Richard Davis Remix) - Sub Static Records
4. DJ Rasoul - True Science - DJ Rasoul
5. The Glass - Won't Bother Me (20:20 Mix) - Fine/Four Music
6. Billy Dalessandro - In The Dark - Kompute Musik
7. Bobby Peru - Venom - 20/20 Vision
8. Martin Solveig - Rocking Music (Martin Solveig Dub) - Defected Records
9. Slam - Lie To Me (FreestyleMan Thirsty Monk Dub) - Soma Records
10. Angel Alanis - Knob Job - A Squared Muzik
11. Infusion - Better World (Wink Interpretation) - BMG
12. Superpitcher - Happiness (Michael Mayer Mix) - Kompakt
13. Joel Mull - Emico - Elp
14. Matrix - Vertigo (Goldtrix Remix) - Metro Recordings
