= Global Underground =

British record label and compilation series

- Founded: 1996
- Founder: Andy Horsfield
- Genre: Trance, progressive house, trance house
- Country of origin: United Kingdom
- Location: London
- Official website: globalunderground.co.uk

Global Underground is a British record label and compilation series founded in 1996 by Andy Horsfield and James Todd. The label has symbolized the international explosion of dance music during the 1990s, 2000s, and 2010s and has featured DJs such as Tony De Vit, Sasha, Paul Oakenfold, John Digweed, Danny Tenaglia, Nick Warren, Dave Seaman, Darren Emerson, James Lavelle, Carl Cox, and Solomun.

The name Global Underground originally refers to a series of electronic music compilation albums which reflect the performances of various DJs in venues around the world. The Global Underground series was released by a record label formerly known as Boxed which featured several sister series such as Nubreed and Electric Calm. Boxed closed in 2001 and was superseded by Global Underground Ltd. Since its first release in 1996, the series was well received and became a hallmark in the progressive house world. The dance music style featured is mostly progressive house, but there is some house, trance house, hard house, techno and breakbeat included in the releases. The first five installments were live recorded from respective clubs, while the rest are mixed and recorded in a studio.

== Background ==
Each issue in the series is based on the idea that Global Underground would take DJs to play a party in one of the most unusual, exotic clubbing locations on Earth. The set is then released in a 2CD format that is formatted to capture the night of the party and the overall feel of the DJ visit in music, contemporary photography by photographer Dean Belcher and extensive sleeve notes.

There are consistent characteristics in almost every album in the series including:

- Each album being mixed by a globe-trotting DJ.
- The prominent influence of the location on the music and packaging.
- Extensive sleeve notes describing local clubbing scene and/or venue often written by Mixmag Editor Dom Phillips.
- Each album consisting of two discs.
- The song list is edited from the complete set based on a retrospective view of the performance.
- Photography by Dean Belcher

== International recognition ==
Billboard has recognized Global Underground as the first DJ mix compilation to place high-quality photographs of DJs on the album covers. This, it further asserted, played a part in turning DJs into superstar figures within the culture of electronic dance music.

Thrive Records was the U.S. distributor for some of the early Global Underground releases. Global Underground albums had an alternate numbering sequence and had different artwork, but were otherwise the same.

== Catalogue ==
This is the complete listing of available albums in the Global Underground main series which includes the sequential number of the album in the series, the performing DJ/producer, the location in which the performance took place and the official release date. The listed catalog numbers are for the British releases. The numbers on the albums distributed by Thrive in the United States are shown in parentheses - those without such labels do not have a differing release number. Global Underground also has several "sub-series" entitled Nubreed, Prototype, 24:7, Electric Calm, Afterhours, Select, Adapt, and most recently Global Underground DJ.

=== GU official ===
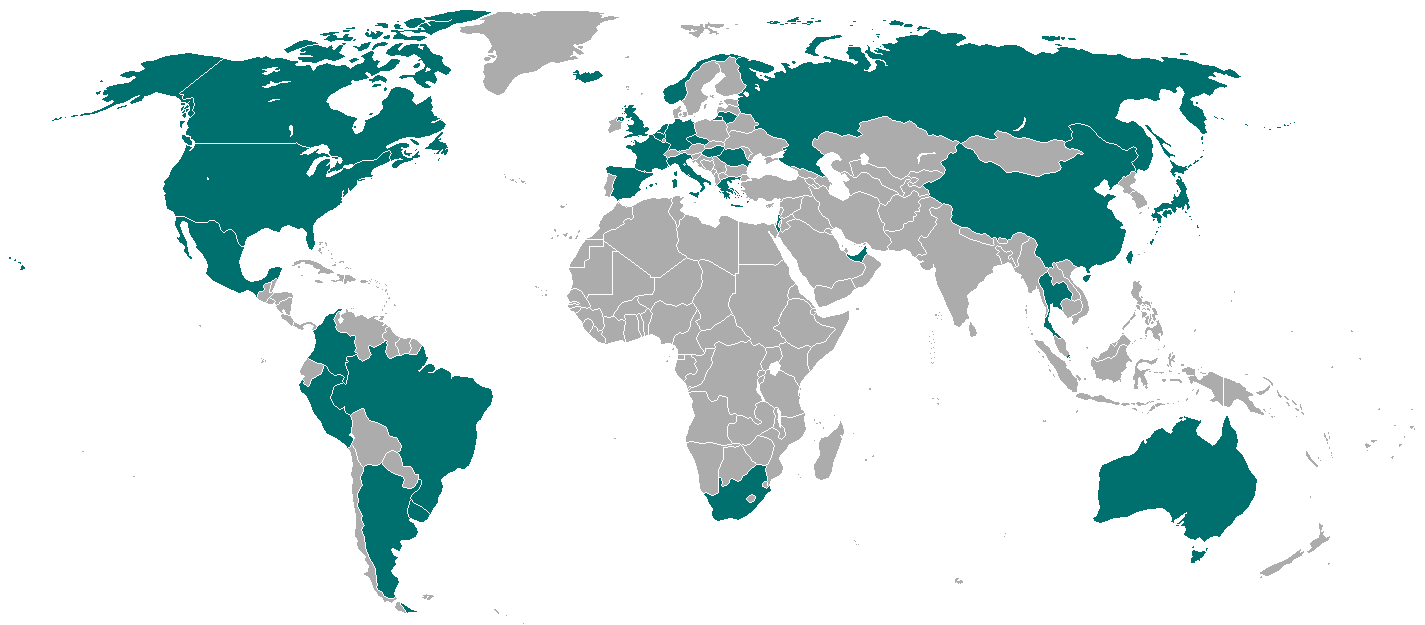
This map shows the countries which have been featured in the GU series through GU043.

Title	Artist	Release date	Peak chart positions			
Title	Artist	Release date	UK Comp	UK Dance	US Dance	NL
001: Tony De Vit, Live in Tel Aviv	Tony De Vit	11 November 1996	—	—	—	—
002 (Note: See #GU002)	None	Not released				
003: Nick Warren, Live in Prague	Nick Warren	24 March 1997	39	—	—	—
004: Paul Oakenfold, Live in Oslo	Paul Oakenfold	9 June 1997	21	—	—	—
005: Tony De Vit, Tokyo	Tony De Vit	6 November 1997	68	—	—	—
006: John Digweed, Sydney (Note: Numbered 001 in the US release.)	John Digweed	13 April 1998	16	—	—	—
007: Paul Oakenfold, New York (Note: Numbered 002 in the US release.)	Paul Oakenfold	25 May 1998	12	—	43	—
008: Nick Warren, Brazil	Nick Warren	27 July 1998	27	—	—	—
009: Sasha, San Francisco (Note: Numbered 003 in the US release.)	Sasha	9 November 1998	18	—	—	—
010: Danny Tenaglia, Athens (Note: Numbered 004 in the US release.)	Danny Tenaglia	15 February 1999	16	—	—	—
011: Nick Warren, Budapest (Note: Numbered 005 in the US release.)	Nick Warren	31 May 1999	20	—	—	—
012: Dave Seaman, Buenos Aires	Dave Seaman	23 August 1999	26	—	—	—
013: Sasha, Ibiza	Sasha	28 September 1999	12	—	—	—
014: John Digweed, Hong Kong	John Digweed	14 December 1999	24	—	—	—
015: Darren Emerson, Uruguay	Darren Emerson	15 May 2000	20	—	—	—
016: Dave Seaman, Cape Town	Dave Seaman	14 August 2000	22	—	—	—
017: Danny Tenaglia, London	Danny Tenaglia	18 September 2000	21	—	—	—
018: Nick Warren, Amsterdam	Nick Warren	6 November 2000	24	26 (Note: UK Dance Albums chart positions prior to 2005 were not counted. This album re-entered the chart in 2007.)	—	—
019: John Digweed, Los Angeles	John Digweed	26 February 2001	14	—	11	—
020: Darren Emerson, Singapore	Darren Emerson	2 July 2001	33	—	—	—
021: Deep Dish, Moscow	Deep Dish	29 October 2001	25	37 (Note: UK Dance Albums chart positions prior to 2005 were not counted. This album re-entered the chart in 2007.)	13	—
022: Dave Seaman, Melbourne	Dave Seaman	29 April 2002	31	—	8	—
023: James Lavelle, Barcelona	James Lavelle	30 September 2002	18	—	19	—
024: Nick Warren, Reykjavik	Nick Warren	24 March 2003	34	—	25	—
025: Deep Dish, Toronto	Deep Dish	2 June 2003	33	30 (Note: UK Dance Albums chart positions prior to 2005 were not counted. This album re-entered the chart in 2007.)	1	—
026: James Lavelle, Romania	James Lavelle	1 March 2004	27	—	26	—
027: Danny Howells, Miami	Danny Howells	28 March 2005	33	—	14	—
028: Nick Warren, Shanghai	Nick Warren	12 July 2005	44	—	14	—
029: Sharam, Dubai	Sharam	2 October 2006	35	1	—	—
030: Nick Warren, Paris	Nick Warren	19 February 2007	44	2	20	—
031: Dubfire, Taipei	Dubfire	2 April 2007	42	2	—	—
032: Adam Freeland, Mexico City	Adam Freeland	4 June 2007	42	3	—	—
033: Layo & Bushwacka!, Rio	Layo & Bushwacka!	8 October 2007	44	4	—	—
034: Felix Da Housecat, Milan	Felix Da Housecat	13 May 2008	53	11	—	—
035: Nick Warren, Lima	Nick Warren	13 October 2008	57	1	—	—
036: Darren Emerson, Bogotá	Darren Emerson	9 February 2009	71	11	—	—
037: James Lavelle, Bangkok	James Lavelle	3 August 2009	31	8	—	—
038: Carl Cox, Black Rock Desert	Carl Cox	1 February 2010	38	12	—	28
039: Dave Seaman, Lithuania	Dave Seaman	27 September 2010	39	24	—	—
040: Solomun, Hamburg	Solomun	31 August 2014	72	25	—	—
041: James Lavelle, Naples	James Lavelle	6 November 2015	41	5	23	—
042: Patrice Bäumel, Berlin	Patrice Bäumel	29 March 2019	48	5	—	—
043: Joris Voorn, Rotterdam	Joris Voorn	30 October 2020	—	—	—	—
044: Amelie Lens - Antwerp	Amelie Lens	25 November 2022	—	—	—	—
045: Danny Tenaglia - Brooklyn	Danny Tenaglia	22 November 2023	—	—	—	—
046: ANNA - Lisbon	ANNA	June 2024	—	—	—	—
047: Joseph Capriati - Montreal	Joseph Capriati	March 2025	—	—	—	—
048: Guy J - Córdoba	Guy J	November 2025	—	—	—	—
049: Deep Dish - Dublin	Deep Dish	22 May 2026	—	—	—	—
"—" denotes a recording that did not chart or was not released in that territory.

=== Prototype ===
Prototype was the first of a sub-series of releases separate from the mainline albums, was given to DJ Seb Fontaine to test if a spin-off series would be successful which after decent sales led to other series being produced like nubreed.

- PRO:001 Seb Fontaine, release date: 29 April 1999
- PRO:002 Seb Fontaine, release date: 2 November 1999
- PRO:003 Seb Fontaine, release date: 18 April 2000
- PRO:004 Seb Fontaine, release date: 29 May 2001

=== Nubreed ===
Nubreed features mix albums from what Boxed considers "up-and-coming DJs", though it has featured experienced DJs such as Satoshi Tomiie.

NuBreed series releases

- Nubreed 001 (2000) by Anthony Pappa
- Nubreed 002 (2000) by Danny Howells
- Nubreed 003 (2000) by Steve Lawler
- Nubreed 004 (2001) by Sander Kleinenberg
- Nubreed 005 (2001) by Lee Burridge
- Nubreed 006 (2002) by Satoshi Tomiie
- Nubreed 007 (2009) by Jim Rivers
- Nubreed 008 (2009) by Sultan
- Nubreed 009 (2016) by Habischman
- Nubreed 010 (2017) by Oliver Schories
- Nubreed 011 (2018) by Theo Kottis
- Nubreed 012 (2018) by Denney

=== 24:7 ===
24:7 is a series where DJs are asked to put together a set of two notably contrasting halves, based on the conceptual opposites of 'day' and 'night'.

24:7 series releases

- GU247001 Danny Howells, release date: 21 July 2003
- GU247002 Lee Burridge, release date: 15 September 2003

=== Lights Out ===
In 2002, former NuBreed DJ Steve Lawler was given his own imprint on the Global Underground label that he titled "Lights Out". The concept of the series of mixed CDs was to bring the darker, grittier side of the dancefloor into the spotlight.

Lights Out series releases

- GULO001 Steve Lawler, release date: 24 June 2002
- GULO002 Steve Lawler, release date: 27 October 2003
- GULO003 Steve Lawler, release date: 3 October 2005

=== GU DJ ===
Similar to nubreed a spin off series of albums given to newer DJs within the scene.

- GUDJ001 Nic Fanciulli, release date: 27 April 2009
- GUDJ002 Plump DJs, release date: 12 October 2009
- GUDJ003 Wally Lopez, release date: 27 April 2009
- GUDJ004 Tom Novy, release date: 15 November 2010

=== GU Music ===
In 2003, the Global Underground franchise began their "GU Music" imprint. Up until this time, they were strictly a label that dealt in DJ compiled and mixed CDs. GU Music allowed Global Underground to get into full length artist albums and Vinyl/CD/MP3 single releases. The GU Music team commented: "Having nurtured some of the worlds finest DJs we have applied this expertise to original music, cherry picking the coolest future talent from across the globe..." They have featured releases from such artists as UNKLE, Lostep, and Trafik. In 2007, it expanded with the release of the compilation GU Mixed which started a series of the same name that consisted of music sought from GU Music.

GU Sampler series releases

- GUSAM001 The Forth, Departures, release date: 27 October 1998
- GUSAM002 The Forth, Arrivals, release date: 1999
- GUSAM003 The Forth, Destinations, release date: 29 January 2001
- GUSAM004 The Forth, Locations, release date: 2001
- GUSAMUS001 The Forth, Passport, release date: 2001
- GUSAM005 The Forth, Exposures, release date: 2004
- GUSAM006 The Forth, Synchronised, release date: October 2005
- GUSAM007 Dubfunk, Synchronised 2, release date: 6 November 2007

GU Music album releases

- GUMU001 Pako & Frederik - Atlantic Breakers, release date: 20 October 2003
- GUMU002 Trafik - Bullet, release date: 4 October 2004
- GUMU003 Lostep - Because We Can, release date: 17 April 2006
- GUMU004 The Remote - Too Low to Miss, release date: 26 June 2006
- GUMU005 Sissy - All Under, release date: 2006
- GUMU006 Dark Globe - Nostalgia for the Future, release date: 2006
- GUMU007 Trafik - Club Trafikana, release date: 6 August 2007
- GUMU008 Roland Klinkenberg - Mexico Can Wait, release date: 20 August 2007
- GUMU009 Eelke Kleijn - Naturally Artificial, release date: 2 October 2007
- GUMU010 Pako & Frederik - The Alert, release date: 5 November 2007
- GUMU011 Rogue Audio - Haphazard, release date: 21 April 2008
- GUMU012 Alex Dolby - Psiko Garden, release date: 17 June 2008
- GUMU013 The Last Atlant - A Cloudburst of Colors, release date: 25 August 2008
- GUMU014 Anil Chawla & Dale Anderson - Roadhouse, release date: 23 February 2009
- GUMU015 Trafik - None But the Brave, release date: 21 June 2010

GU Mixed Releases

- GUMIX1CD CD1, CD2, CD3 In mixed and unmixed formats, release date: 21 May 2007
- GUMIX1CDX CD1, CD2, CD3, CD4 Limited Edition in mixed and unmixed formats, release date: 21 May 2007
- GUMIX2CD CD1, CD2, CD3 In mixed and unmixed formats, release date: 3 September 2007
- GUMIX2CDX CD1, CD2, CD3, CD4 Limited Edition in mixed and unmixed formats, release date: 3 September 2007
- GUMIX3CD CD1, CD2, CD3 In mixed and unmixed formats, release date: 16 June 2008
- GUMIX3CDX CD1, CD2, CD3, CD4 Limited Edition in mixed and unmixed formats, release date: 16 June 2008
- GUMIX4CD CD1, CD2, CD3 In mixed format, release date: 25 May 2009

Anniversary compilations

- GUXCD GU10 10th anniversary compilation release date: 15 May 2006
- GU: Twenty - 20th anniversary compilation release date: 28 October 2016
- GU: Thirty - 30th anniversary compilation release date: 16 October 2026

=== Fundacion ===
Fundacion series releases

- GUFUN001C Sasha - Fundacion NYC, release date: 13 June 2005

=== Chill out compilations ===
Electric Calm is a series in the chill or "calm" side of electronica while Afterhours is similar to the Back to Mine series. Both Afterhours and Electric Calm, along with GU "Sampler" CDs, were compiled and mixed by Global Underground themselves.

Electric Calm series releases

- GUEC001 The Forth, release date: 30 September 2002
- GUEC002 The Forth, release date: 25 August 2003
- GUEC003 The Forth, release date: 13 February 2006
- GUEC004 Dubfunk, release date: 1 October 2007
- GUEC005 Trafik, release date: 7 December 2009
- GUEC006 Trafik, release date: 21 August 2015
- GUEC007 Trafik, release date: 19 May 2017

Afterhours series releases

- GUAF001 The Forth, release date: 11 November 2002
- GUAF002 Trafik, release date: 21 February 2005
- GUAF003 Trafik, release date: 29 January 2007
- GUAF004 Trafik, release date: 16 July 2007
- GUAF005 Unknown, release date: 30 March 2008
- GUAF006 Unknown, release date: 28 July 2008
- GUAF007 Unknown, release date: 22 April 2016
- GUAF008 Unknown, release date: 20 April 2018

== GU002 ==
In Boxed's UK releases, GU002 was the never released second installment in the Global Underground series (in Thrive's US re-numbered releases, Paul Oakenfold's New York mix was released as GU002). Global Underground jumped directly from GU001: Tony De Vit - Live In Tel Aviv to GU003: Nick Warren - Prague, which resulted in a lot of controversy and rumours on the nature of GU002. However, GU002 does exist in form of the tape pack of Tony De Vit's Tel Aviv CD as the actual catalogue number of the release is GU002T. When Boxed started the GU series in 1996, they did not have a clear vision about the numbering scheme (later to become part of their image), which resulted in the "missing" release.

== See also ==
- Balance (series)
- DJ-Kicks
- In Search of Sunrise (series)
