= MMII (album) =

Compilation album (Mixtape) by John Digweed
- Released: 2002
- Genre: Progressive house
- Length: 71:03
- Label: Bedrock Records
- Producer: John Digweed

John Digweed chronology
GU 019 (2001)	MMII (2002)	Fabric 20 (2005)

Professional ratings
Review scores
Source	Rating
Allmusic	3/5 stars
Progressive-Sounds	10/10 stars
Rolling Stone	(favorable)
Resident Advisor	5/5 stars

MMII is a DJ mix mixed by John Digweed and released on Bedrock Records. Progressive-Sounds calls it a "cornucopia of sound" and a mix of "dark, spacey grooves".

== Track listing ==
1. Pollon - "Lonely Planet" – 7:09
2. Pole Folder & CP - "Dust" – 8:19
3. Bermuda Triangle - "Mooger Fooger" – 5:32
4. Sean Q6 - "Of Course" – 4:59
5. Flash Brothers - "Protect The Sense" – 4:48
6. 108 Grand - "Te Quiero (Darren Emerson Remix)" – 9:21
7. Shakespear's Sister - "Black Sky (Dub Extravaganza part 2)" – 8:20
8. James Holden - "I Have Put Out The Light" – 4:43
9. Spooky - "Belong (Vocal Club Mix)" – 8:54
10. Mandalay - "Deep Love (Charlie May Remix)" – 8:58
