= Transitions (John Digweed album) =

Compilation album by John Digweed
- Released: 5 June 2006
- Genre: Electronic
- Label: Renaissance
- Producer: John Digweed

John Digweed chronology
| Fabric 20 (2005) | Transitions (2006) | Transitions Vol. 2 (2007) |

Professional ratings
Review scores
| Source | Rating |
|---|---|
| Progressive-Sounds | 4.5/5 stars |
| Resident Advisor | 4/5 stars |

Transitions is a DJ mix compilation album by John Digweed released on Renaissance Records in 2006.

== Track listing ==
1. Partial Arts - "Cruising" (6:13)
2. Every - "Feelin'" (5:26)
3. Popnoname - On The Run (5:52)
4. Margot Meets The Melody Maker - "Torch (Extrawelt Remix)" (4:45)
5. Tigerskin - Neontrance (5:23)
6. Catwash - "Plastic Rubberband" (5:18)
7. David K - "Beautiful Dead" (4:00)
8. Diringer - "Flake Escape" (4:05)
9. Rocco* - "Roots 4 Acid" (5:46)
10. Trick & Kubic - "Easy (John Digweed Edit)" (3:56)
11. On Spec - "Knights of Columbos (Original Mix)" (4:55)
12. John Digweed - "Warung Beach (Lützenkirchen Remix)" (5:17)
13. Michel De Hey - "Jetchi (John Digweed Edit)" (4:02)
14. Dana Bergquist - "McEnroe" (4:17)
15. Paul Kalkbrenner - "Gebrünn Gebrünn" (5:38)
