= Hernán Cattáneo =

Argentine house DJ (born 1965)

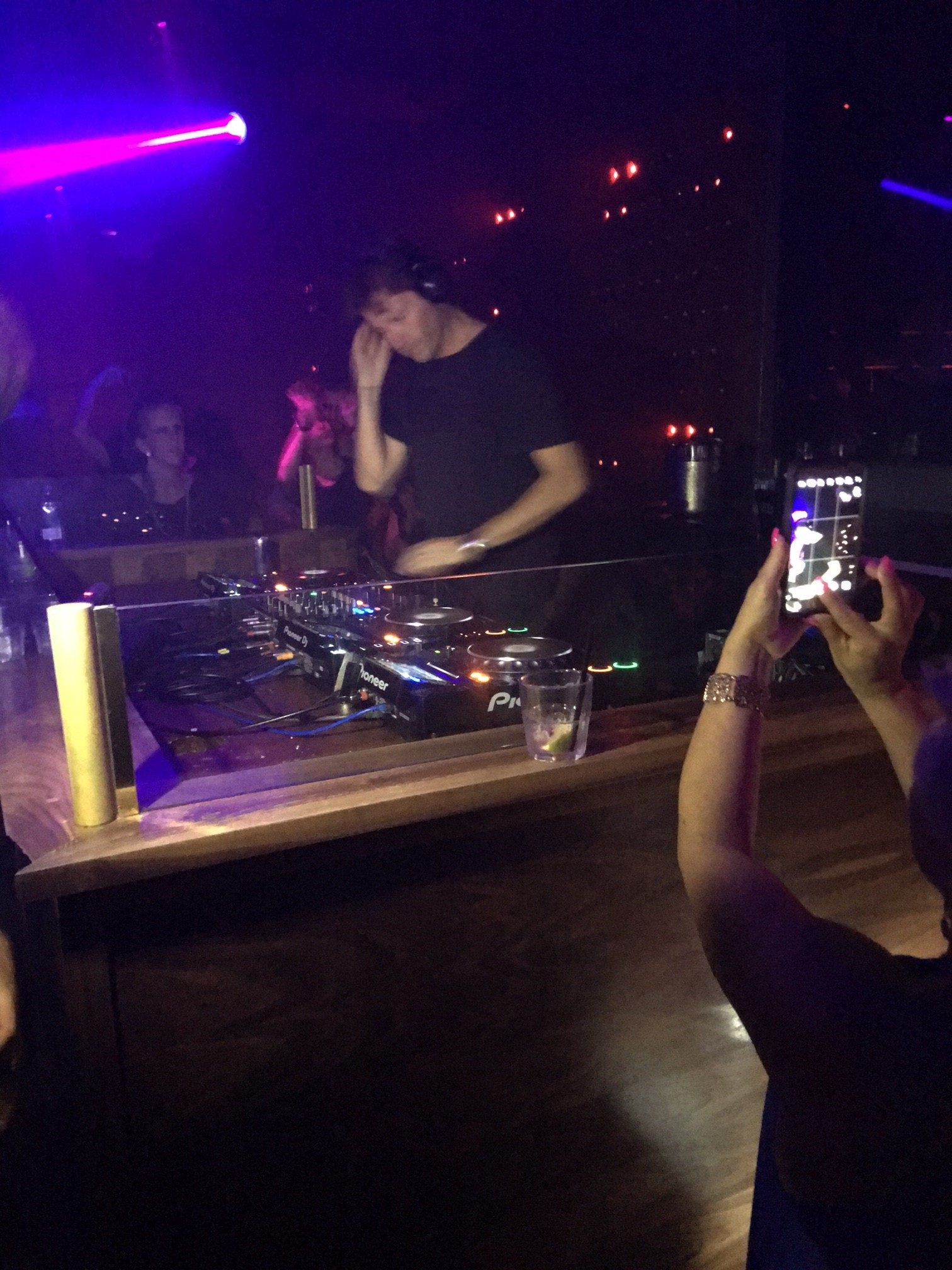
- Hernán Cattáneo in San Francisco 9/23/16

Background information
- Born: 4 March 1965 (age 61)
- Origin: Buenos Aires, Argentina
- Genres: Progressive house; Deep house; Tribal house
- Occupations: DJ; record producer; remixer; radio host
- Years active: 1983–present
- Labels: Sudbeat; Balance Music; Perfecto Records; Renaissance Recordings
- Website: www.hernancattaneo.com

Hernán Cattáneo (Spanish pronunciation: [eɾˈnaŋ kaˈtaneo]; born 4 March 1965), known as "El Maestro", is an Argentine DJ and record producer associated with progressive house. He is known for long DJ sets. He founded the record label Sudbeat in 2009 and hosts the weekly radio show and podcast Resident.

== Early life and influences ==
Cattáneo was born in Buenos Aires. His father was a lawyer and the son of Italian immigrants. His father did not think DJing could support a family. Cattáneo first saw a DJ play at 15, when Alejandro Pont Lezica played a party at his school.

As a teenager he listened to Depeche Mode and New Order. Detroit techno artists such as Derrick May, Kevin Saunderson and Juan Atkins made him want to become a DJ. In 1987 a friend brought him Chicago house records from New York. Through them he discovered Frankie Knuckles, who became a major influence. In the early 1990s he travelled abroad just to see Knuckles play.

He started out playing at quinceañera parties. He has said he sold a car to pay for a trip abroad to hear international DJs and learn how they worked.

== Musical career ==
External audio
- Resident / Episode 299 28 January 2017

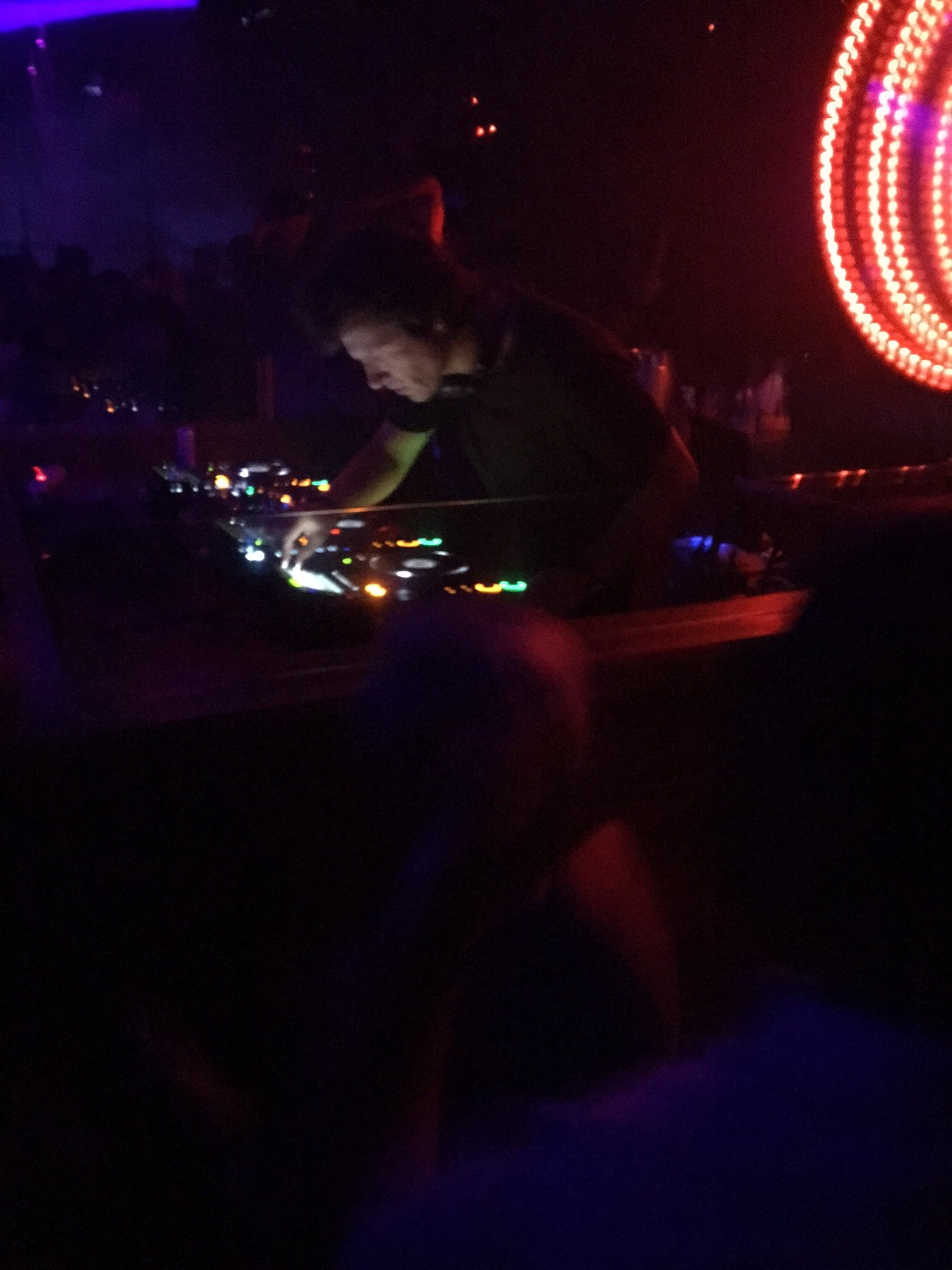
Hernán performing

=== Buenos Aires and Oakenfold ===
Cattáneo began his professional career playing in the early 1990s for FM Z95, a local radio station largely responsible for the diffusion of electronic dance music in Argentina. He was named DJ of the Year in Argentina in 1996 and 1997.

In 1996, he won the residency at Clubland Pacha in Buenos Aires. During his residency, DJ Paul Oakenfold performed at Pacha while on tour. Oakenfold then asked Hernán to open for him on his global tours. This exposed him to an international crowd that he otherwise may not have reached outside of Argentina. Shortly thereafter, he signed to Paul Oakenfold's Perfecto Records, which later led him to become a Cream resident in Liverpool, England and Ibiza, Spain. He toured the world with Oakenfold in 1999 and 2000. He told Pacha's owners he would be gone for three months, but did not return to the residency for 15 years.

=== Perfecto and Renaissance ===
His first single on Perfecto was "Deep Funk" in 2001. "Satellites" followed in 2002 and "Hubbub" in 2003. In 2002 he mixed South America, his first mix album released outside Argentina. From 2004 he mixed albums for Renaissance, including several volumes of The Masters Series and two Sequential albums.

In May 2007, he released Sequential Volume 2, which was once again followed by another worldwide tour to promote the compilation.

=== Sudbeat and Balance ===
Cattáneo started his own label, Sudbeat, in 2009. It releases music by new producers, many from Argentina, as well as established artists such as Nick Warren and Dave Seaman. He has said he started it to support artists he liked and help young producers, as others had helped him. Guy J's 2014 remix of "Altair", by Cattáneo and Soundexile, became one of the label's best-known releases. Between 2014 and 2019 he mixed three albums for Balance Music: Balance 026, Balance Presents Sudbeat and Balance Presents SunsetStrip.

=== Resident ===
In the 2000s he hosted Metrodance, a weekly show on 95.1 FM in Buenos Aires. He now hosts Resident, a weekly radio show and podcast that also airs in Buenos Aires on Urbana Play (104.3 FM). Each episode has ten new tracks, and he does not repeat tracks between episodes. The 787th episode aired in June 2026.

=== Connected ===
In February 2018 Cattáneo played four nights at the Teatro Colón in Buenos Aires with a 50-piece orchestra conducted by Gerardo Gardelin, in a show called Connected. A week later the same show was staged for about 40,000 people at the free UNICOS festival in Buenos Aires. A 40-minute documentary about the show was released on Netflix in 2021.

=== Sunsetstrip ===
In 2019 Cattáneo started Sunsetstrip, an outdoor event held at the Campo Argentino de Polo in Buenos Aires. The second edition, in February 2020, was billed with a seven-hour set by Cattáneo. The event has since been held in other cities, and a Madrid edition was announced for 2026.

=== Touring ===
At his busiest he took up to 150 flights a year. His publisher states that over more than 30 years he has used fifteen passports and taken about 3,000 flights. By 2025 he had played more than 4,000 shows in over 300 cities. He has played at Creamfields, Exit, and Refresh Festival.

== Style ==
Cattáneo is known for long sets. He has played sets of 14 and 24 hours. In Córdoba, Argentina, he played two nights at the Forja venue, for five hours and then nine hours, to a combined audience of over 30,000. He has said he enjoys long sets and plays them when the venue and crowd suit it.

His sets mix progressive house with house, techno and deep house, with a strong emphasis on melody.

== Collaborations ==
Cattáneo often plays back-to-back with Nick Warren, including a regular joint show in Belgrade. The two also shared a show in Auckland in 2022.

In April 2011 he played with Danny Howells inside Liverpool Cathedral. The two later played an all-night show at Koko in London, which ended with a two-hour back-to-back set. In July 2024 he played an extended back-to-back set with Sasha at Las Dalias in Ibiza.

== Support for new artists ==
Cattáneo uses Sudbeat and Resident to promote young DJs and producers. Many of the artists on Sudbeat are new Argentine producers, such as Mariano Mellino and Marcelo Vasami, and he has brought them to play at his own shows. The label also releases music by other South American producers. Electronic Groove has described him as a mentor as well as a DJ and label owner.

== Reception ==
AllMusic's Jason Birchmeier called him Argentina's most famous superclub DJ, and placed him alongside Paul Oakenfold, John Digweed, Danny Tenaglia, Danny Howells and Sasha. The writer Juan Data called him "the Maradona of Argentine DJs". As a DJ, he rose to No. 22 and then to No. 6 on the DJ Mag poll of the Top 100 DJs. He was at No. 82 in 2011.

== Memoir ==
His memoir, El Sueño del DJ: Memorias, was presented in Barcelona on 10 August 2021. It covers his early years, his trips to New York to see Frankie Knuckles, his residency at Pacha and his tours with Oakenfold. An updated edition was published by Booket in April 2026.

== Honours and awards ==
- DJ of the Year (Argentina), 1996 and 1997
- Best Progressive DJ, Ibiza DJ Awards
- Personalidad Destacada de la Cultura (Outstanding Cultural Personality) of the City of Buenos Aires
- Konex Award – Platinum, DJ/Electronic, 2025

== Discography ==
=== Compilations ===
- Clubland, Volume 1 (1999)
- Clubland, Volume 2 (2000)
- Ministry Magazine Presents Hernán Cattáneo: Funky Deep 'N' Tribal (2001)
- Perfecto Presents Hernán Cattáneo: South America (2002)
- Renaissance The Masters Series: Hernán Cattáneo, Volume 1 (2004)
- Renaissance The Masters Series: Hernán Cattáneo, Volume 2 (2005)
- Renaissance Presents Hernán Cattáneo: Sequential (2006)
- Renaissance Presents Hernán Cattáneo: Sequential, Volume 2 (2007)
- Renaissance The Masters Series: Hernán Cattáneo, Volume 3 (2009)
- Renaissance The Masters Series: Parallel: Hernán Cattáneo (2010)
- Renaissance The Masters Series: Part 17 (2012)
- Balance 026: Hernán Cattáneo (2014)
- Balance Presents Sudbeat – Hernán Cattáneo (2017)
- Balance Presents Hernán Cattáneo: SunsetStrip (2019)

=== Singles ===
- Hernan Cattáneo & Soundexile – Citycism [Sudbeat]
- Hernan Cattáneo & Soundexile – Infoxication [Sudbeat]
- Hernan Cattáneo & Soundexile – Teleport [Sudbeat]
- Hernan Cattáneo & Soundexile Feat Tomomi Ukumori – Cripsis [Sudbeat]
- Hernan Cattáneo & Soundexile – Altair [Sudbeat]
- Hernan Cattáneo & John Tonks – July / Fereek [Sudbeat]
- Hernan Cattáneo & Soundexile – The Remixes EP [Sudbeat]
- Hernan Cattáneo & John Tonks – Anime [Urbantorque]
- Hernan Cattáneo & John Tonks – Sirocco [Renaissance]
- Hernan Cattáneo & John Tonks – Warsaw [Bedrock Breaks]
- Hernan Cattáneo & Dean Coleman – Behind The Music [Renaissance Masters CD]
- Cattáneo/Cass/Mangan – Hubub [Perfecto Records]
- Hernan Cattáneo – Satellites/Deeper Layers [Perfecto Records]
- Hernan Cattáneo – Landing [Southamerica CD]
- Hernan Cattáneo – Deep Funk/Alone [Perfecto Records]

=== Remixes ===
- Alex Savanin – InFlight [Highway Records]
- Lonya & Hakimonu – Sea saw [Sudbeat]
- Ioan Gamboa – Spiral [Sudbeat]
- M.O.D.E. – Circles [Sudbeat]
- Fefo & Dario Arcas – Take Me Away [Sudbeat]
- Antix – Let The Right One In [Sudbeat]
- Abyss – Amore [Sudbeat]
- Henry Saiz – They Came From The Light [Natura Sonoris]
- Applescal – Describe The Doc [Deep Focus Records]
- Schoenbrunn & Pfenning – Mind Groove [Observe Records]
- James Harcourt – Arachnofunk [Twisted Frequency Records]
- Tomomi Ukomori – With You [Indigo CD]
- Nick Muir – I Feel Real [Mashtronic Records]
- Funk Harmony Park – Crystal Sky [Arctic Wave Records]
- Phonique Featuring Erland Oye – For The Time Being [Renaissance]
- Bedrock – Santiago [Bedrock Records]
- M.M.M – Enter The Club [Lifetime Records]
- Cascade – Escape [Fluid]
- Oliverio & MOS – Break My Mind [Off Side Recordings]
- Atmos – Raumwelt Signal [Spiral Traxx]
- Jeff Bennett – Strange Items [Hearing Aid]
- Morgan Page – All I Know [Bedrock Records]
- Transluzent Feat. Odessa – I Need You [Ark Records]
- Dope Smugglaz – The Word [Perfecto Records]
- Pako & Frederik – Beatus Possessor [Coded Records]
- Liquid State – Falling [Perfecto Records]
- Stella Brown – Never Knew Love [Perfecto Records]
- Alto Camet – Pasión descalza [Shinichi Records]
- Soulfire – Eris [Soulfire Downloads]

== See also ==
- List of DJ Awards winners and nominees
- List of house music artists
- List of progressive house artists
