= Imagine This Is a High Dimensional Space of All Possibilities =

Studio album by James Holden
- Released: 31 March 2023
- Studio: Sacred Walls, London, England, United Kingdom
- Genre: Electronic music
- Length: 64:39
- Label: Border Community
- Producer: James Holden

James Holden chronology
A Cambodian Spring (2019)	Imagine This Is a High Dimensional Space of All Possibilities (2023)

Imagine This Is a High Dimensional Space of All Possibilities is a 2023 studio album by British electronic musician James Holden. It has received positive reviews from critics.

== Reception ==
Editors at AnyDecentMusic? scored this album an 8.1 out of 10, aggregating nine reviews. According to the review aggregator Metacritic, Imagine This Is a High Dimensional Space of All Possibilities received "universal acclaim" based on a weighted average score of 86 out of 100 from 11 critic scores.

Editors at AllMusic rated this album 4 out of 5 stars, with critic Paul Simpson writing "Imagine This Is a High Dimensional Space of All Possibilities is perhaps the furthest-out release in a discography full of inventive, inspired music, and it's some of Holden's most exciting and impressive work". Clash Music's Lee Wakefield rated this album a 7 out of 10, writing that Holden's "ability to convey transcendence through his music is unmatched". Ludovic Hunter-Tilney of The Financial Times rated it 4 out of 5 stars, writing that "distortion and drones cause the different musical elements to bleed together". At The Line of Best Fit, Janne Oinonen rated this album 9 out of 10, stating that it "packs a bewildering and borderline disorientating (in a very good way) array of musical ideas, with results that combine dense layering and wealth of detail with plenty of alluring spaces between the notes for the listener to get lost in". Dominic Haley in Loud and Quiet scored Imagine This Is a High Dimensional Space of All Possibilities a 7 out of 10, noting that "an atmosphere of hauntology looms over" the recording and is made up of "a hypnotic world of pulsing bass and blissful noise".

Ben Hogwood of musicOMH rated this album 4.5 out of 5 stars, comparing this work to artists as varied as Can and The Orb, summing up his review that "Holden has created a life-affirming hour in the musical heavens, just as the title promises". The Observer's Kitty Empire gave this album a five-star review for "integrating all that has gone before" in Holden's career, with a result that "is magnificent: "dance" music that bursts out of the grid with retro textures, prelapsarian oscillations, birdsong and bells". Writing for Pitchfork, Andy Cush rated this album a 7.8 out of 10, noting that Holden has returned to the rave music after experimenting with other genres and that it lets users "sense a magical world" in the music. Bernie Brooks of The Quietus likened this album to a playful childhood memory and states that the album has "a sort of beauty and sensitivity, even when at its most challenging or strange". The editors of Resident Advisor chose this as a recommendation, with critic Dash Lewis calling this Holden's "most spiritually moving music yet" and continuing that "Holden finds a way to incorporate an incredible amount of ideas into every piece".

Mojo ranked this the 18th best album of 2023. Editors at The Quietus chose it for the 59th best album of 2023. Editors at Pitchfork included this in a list of the best electronic music of 2023. Editors at AllMusic included this on their list of favorite electronic albums of 2023.

== Track listing ==
All songs written by James Holden.

1. "You Are in a Clearing" – 2:51
2. "Contains Multitudes" – 9:15
3. "Common Land" – 5:21
4. "Trust Your Feet" – 6:43
5. "The Missing Key" – 3:36
6. "In the End You'll Know" – 6:28
7. "Continuous Revolution" – 5:46
8. "Four Ways Down the Valley" – 3:55
9. "Worlds Collide Mountains Form" – 3:35
10. "The Answer Is Yes" – 6:32
11. "Infinite Fadeout" – 4:59
12. "You Can Never Go Back" – 5:43

== Personnel ==
- James Holden – instrumentation, recording, mixing, production, layout
- Eric James – mastering at Philosophers Barn
- Jorge Velez – artwork, illustration

== See also ==
- List of 2023 albums
