= Saw Recordings =

House music record label

- Founder: Satoshi Tomiie, Hector Romero
- Country of origin: United States

Saw Recordings is a house music record label created by Satoshi Tomiie and Hector Romero. It has featured releases from artists such as Guti, Nathan Fake, Lexicon Avenue, SLOK, Medway, and Gabriel & Dresden.

== See also ==
- List of record labels
