= The Idiots Are Winning =

Studio album by James Holden
- Released: 2006
- Genre: Electronic
- Label: Border Community

Professional ratings
Review scores
Source	Rating
The Guardian	4/5 stars

The Idiots Are Winning is the debut album by English electronic music producer James Holden. It was released in 2006 as the fourteenth record on Holden's own record label, Border Community.

The title of the album is a quote from British comedy series Nathan Barley.

== Track listing ==
1. "Lump"
2. "Quiet Drumming Interlude"
3. "10101"
4. "Corduroy"
5. "Flute"
6. "Idiot"
7. "Lumpette"
8. "Intentionally Left Blank"
9. "Idiot Clapsolo"
10. "Quiet Drumming"

== Reception ==
The album received a positive review in The Guardian which called it "the most invigoratingly coherent blast of pure electronic sound since the Boards of Canada last remembered to set their alarm clock."

A reviewer for Drowned in Sound gave the album a score of 10/10, calling it "masterful" and stating that it "raises the bar for producers in all fields of electronica and opens up new doors to what the field can actually achieve."

Writing for Pitchfork, Matthew Herbert named The Idiots Are Winning as one of his top five albums of 2006.

A review in Stylus Magazine gave the album a rating of 'B+', calling it "gorgeously magisterial."
