= Darran Anderson =

Irish writer (born c. 1980)

- Born: Derry, Northern Ireland
- Occupation: Writer
- Writing career
- Period: 2009–present
- Genres: Creative nonfiction, memoir, cultural criticism, poetry
- Subjects: Cities, architecture, music, the Troubles
- Notable works: Imaginary Cities (2015); Inventory (2020)

Darran Anderson is an Irish writer of creative nonfiction, known for his books on cities, architecture, music and memory. He is the author of Imaginary Cities (2015) and the memoir Inventory (2020). Imaginary Cities was named a book of the year by the Financial Times and The Guardian. He was a co-editor of the literary webzine 3:AM Magazine, and earlier of Dogmatika. He also published a number of poetry collections.

Anderson was born and raised in Derry, Northern Ireland, where he grew up during the closing years of the Troubles. The city, the River Foyle and his family's experience of the Troubles became central subjects of his later work.

== Bibliography ==
Non-fiction

- Imaginary Cities: A Tour of Dream Cities, Nightmare Cities, and Everywhere in Between. London: Influx Press, 2015; Chicago: University of Chicago Press, 2017. ISBN 978-0226470306.
- Inventory: A Memoir. London: Chatto & Windus, 2020; New York: Farrar, Straus and Giroux, 2020. ISBN 978-1784741501.

Poetry

- Tesla's Ghost. Blackheath Books.
- The Fool.
- The Magnetic Mountain.
