= Mixmag =

British music magazine

- Editor: Patrick Hinton
- Managing Director: Nick Stevenson
- Categories: Music magazine
- Frequency: Monthly
- First issue: 1 February 1983; 42 years ago
- Company: Wasted Talent Ltd
- Country: United Kingdom
- Based in: London
- Language: English
- Website: mixmag.net
- ISSN: 0957-6622
- OCLC: 780074556

Mixmag is a British electronic dance and clubbing magazine published in London. Launched in 1983 as a print magazine, it has branched into dance events, including festivals and club nights.

== History ==
The first issue of Mixmag was printed on 1 February 1983 as a 16-page black-and-white magazine published by Disco Mix Club, a DJ mailout service. The first cover featured American music group Shalamar.

When house music began in the 1980s, editor and DJ Dave Seaman turned the magazine from a newsletter for DJs into a magazine covering all dance music and club culture. Mixmag, in association with its original publishing company, DMC Publishing, released a series of CDs under the "Mixmag Live" heading. The magazine, which reached a circulation of up to 70,000 copies, was later sold to EMAP Ltd. in the mid-1990s.

In 1996, an American version titled Mixmag USA was launched. It was renamed Mixer after the UK edition of Mixmag was sold to EMAP. It ceased publication altogether in 2003.

After a fall in sales in 2003, Mixmag was acquired by Development Hell, in 2005. In 2007, Nick DeCosemo became editor. Duncan Dick became editor in April 2015. Patrick Hinton became editor in August 2022. In 2012, The Guardian collaborated with Mixmag on a survey of British drug-taking habits.

The magazine ended its print edition in April 2020 during the COVID-19 pandemic, and as of 2025 is now online only.

Mixmag is owned by Wasted Talent Ltd, a company which changed its name from Mixmag Media Ltd in May 2017.
