= Dave Seaman =

British DJ and record producer (born 1968)

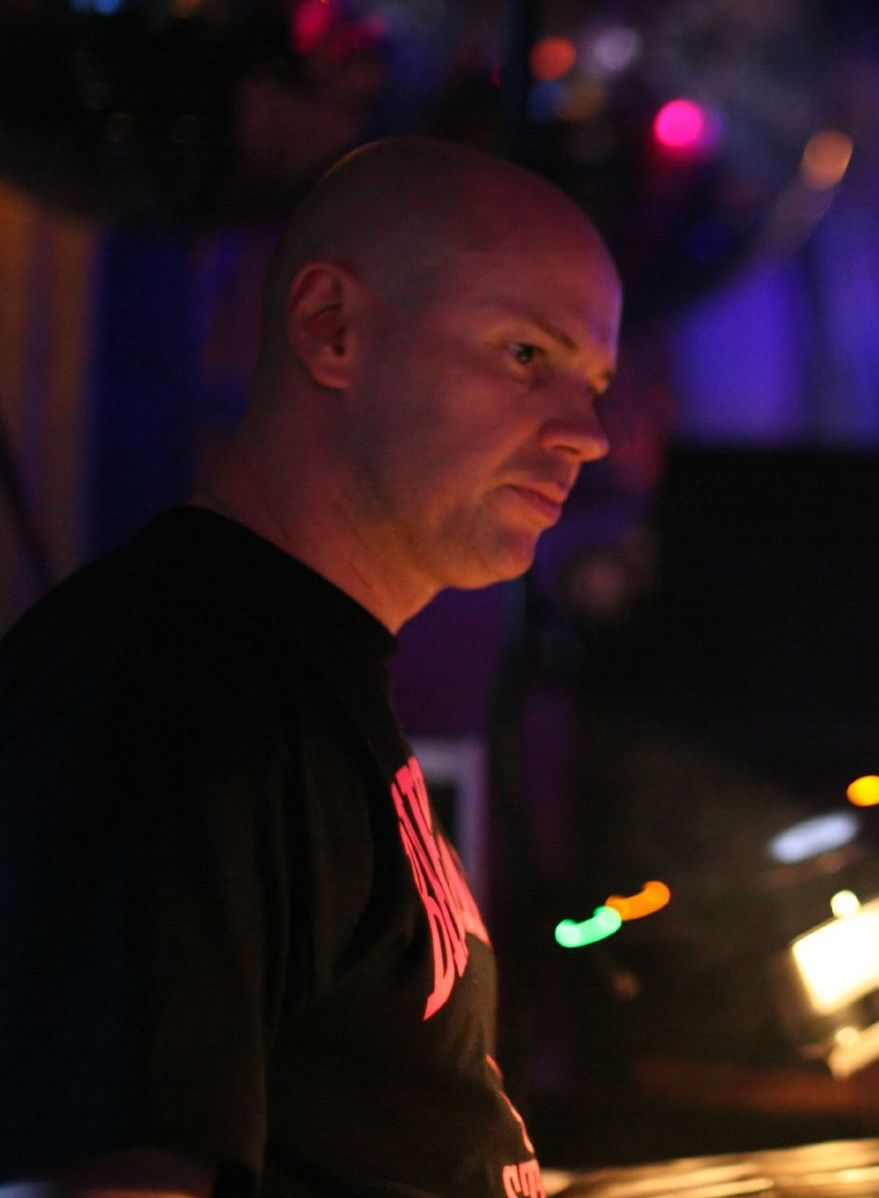
- Dave Seaman in Melbourne in 2006.

Background information
- Born: 29 April 1968 (age 58)
- Origin: Leeds, West Yorkshire, UK
- Genres: Electronic, tech house, techno, deep house, progressive house
- Occupations: DJ, record producer
- Years active: 1990–present
- Labels: Audio Therapy, Selador Recordings
- Member of: Brothers in Rhythm
- Website: djdaveseaman.com

Dave Seaman (born 29 April 1968) is a British DJ and record producer. He was formerly a member of the DMC Publishing, and editor of music magazine Mixmag.

== Biography ==
He formed Brothers in Rhythm with Steve Anderson and they were later joined by Alan Bremner, doing production work for (amongst others) Pet Shop Boys and Kylie Minogue and remixes for David Bowie, New Order, U2, Michael Jackson and more.

He has since founded Audio Therapy record label and now runs Selador Recordings with Steve Parry. He is also well known for his releases in the famed Renaissance Masters Series and a number of releases for Global Underground.

== Early life ==
He went to school in Garforth, West Yorkshire.

== Discography ==
=== Mix albums ===
- 1991: Mixmag, Vol. 1 with Carl Cox (DMC)
- 1993: DJ Culture, Vol. 1 with Sasha and John Digweed (Stress Records)
- 1995: DJ Culture, Vol. 2 with Nick Warren (Stress Records)
- 1995: Mixmag, Vol. 10 with Masters at Work (DMC)
- 1995: DJs at Work, Vol. 1 (Pimp Music)
- 1996: Renaissance Vol. 4 (Six 6)
- 1996: Renaissance The Silk Mix
- 1997: Renaissance Worldwide: London with Robert Miles (Renaissance)
- 1998: Renaissance Worldwide: Singapore with David Morales and BT (Renaissance)
- 1999: Global Underground: Buenos Aires (Boxed)
- 1999: Back to Mine (DMC)
- 1999: Renaissance Worldwide: America (Renaissance)
- 2000: Renaissance: Awakening (Renaissance)
- 2000: Global Underground: Cape Town (Boxed)
- 2001: Renaissance: Desire (Renaissance)
- 2002: Global Underground: Melbourne (Global Underground)
- 2004: Therapy Sessions with Phil K (Renaissance)
- 2005: Therapy Sessions, Vol. 2 with Luke Chable (Renaissance)
- 2005: This is Audiotherapy (Audio Therapy)
- 2006: Renaissance: The Masters Series, Part 7 (Renaissance)
- 2007: Therapy Sessions, Vol.3 with Lexicon Avenue (Audio Therapy)
- 2007: Therapy Sessions, Vol.4 (Audio Therapy)
- 2008: Renaissance: The Masters Series, Part 10 (Renaissance)
- 2009: Renaissance: The Masters Series, Part 14 (Renaissance)
- 2010: Global Underground: Lithuania (Global Underground)
- 2011: Renaissance: The Masters Series, Part 17 (Renaissance)
- 2013: The Selador Sessions (Selador)
- 2015: Beyond Borders: Berlin (Armada)

=== Singles ===
- 2013: "The Holy Ghost" (Tulipa)
- 2013: "Everything Come in Threes" (Tulipa)
- 2014: "Naughty Forest" (Selador)
- 2014: "Justified Replacement of Lulu" (Selador)
- 2014: "Distraction Tactics" (Sullivan Room)
- 2015: "Right Side of Wrong" (Sudbeat)
- 2015: "Sparkle Motion" (Tulipa)
- 2015: "Dance in Tongues/Strobelight Symphony" (Noir)
- 2015: "Private Education" (Suara)
- 2015: "Gumball" (Hive Audio)
- 2016: "Nightfalls" (Selador)
- 2016: "Do Geese See God/Devil Never Even Lived" (Carioca)
