= Paolo Mojo =

London-based DJ

- Born: Paul Bimson
- Genres: Progressive House, Techno, Tech House
- Occupations: DJ, producer, remixer
- Years active: 2001–present
- Label: Oosh Recordings
- Website: http://www.paolomojo.com/

Paolo Mojo, originally from St. Helens, Merseyside, but now based in London, United Kingdom, is an English electronica DJ. His style incorporates the genres of house, funk, techno, breaks, electro, disco, and acid music. He was the mixer behind the Renaissance label's Renaissance Digital 01: Paolo Mojo, which was the first DJ mix to be made exclusively for an iTunes release. He also compiled the 9th in the Balance series of DJ mix compilations, released by EQ Recordings since 2001.

== Releases ==
- Back In The Day (12") Sabotage Systems 2003
- Dirty Bwaad (12", Ltd) Orc Music 2004
- Kunteebumm (12") Music Is Freedom 2004
- Discotech EP (12") Honchos Music 2005
- Motor Strings (12") Sensei 2005
- 1983 (12") Pryda Friends 2006
- Balance 009 (2xCD) EQ Recordings 2006
- Everybody (Drop Kick) (12") Oosh 2006
- Rukus (12") Saved Records 2006
- Darkplace (12") Oosh 2007
- JMJ (12", Single) Oosh 2007
- Renaissance Digital 01 (File, MP3) Renaissance 2007
- "Interstellar" (2008), Oosh
- Remixes:
- Cosmic Cons (12")
