= Satoshi Tomiie =

Satoshi Tomiie 富家 哲
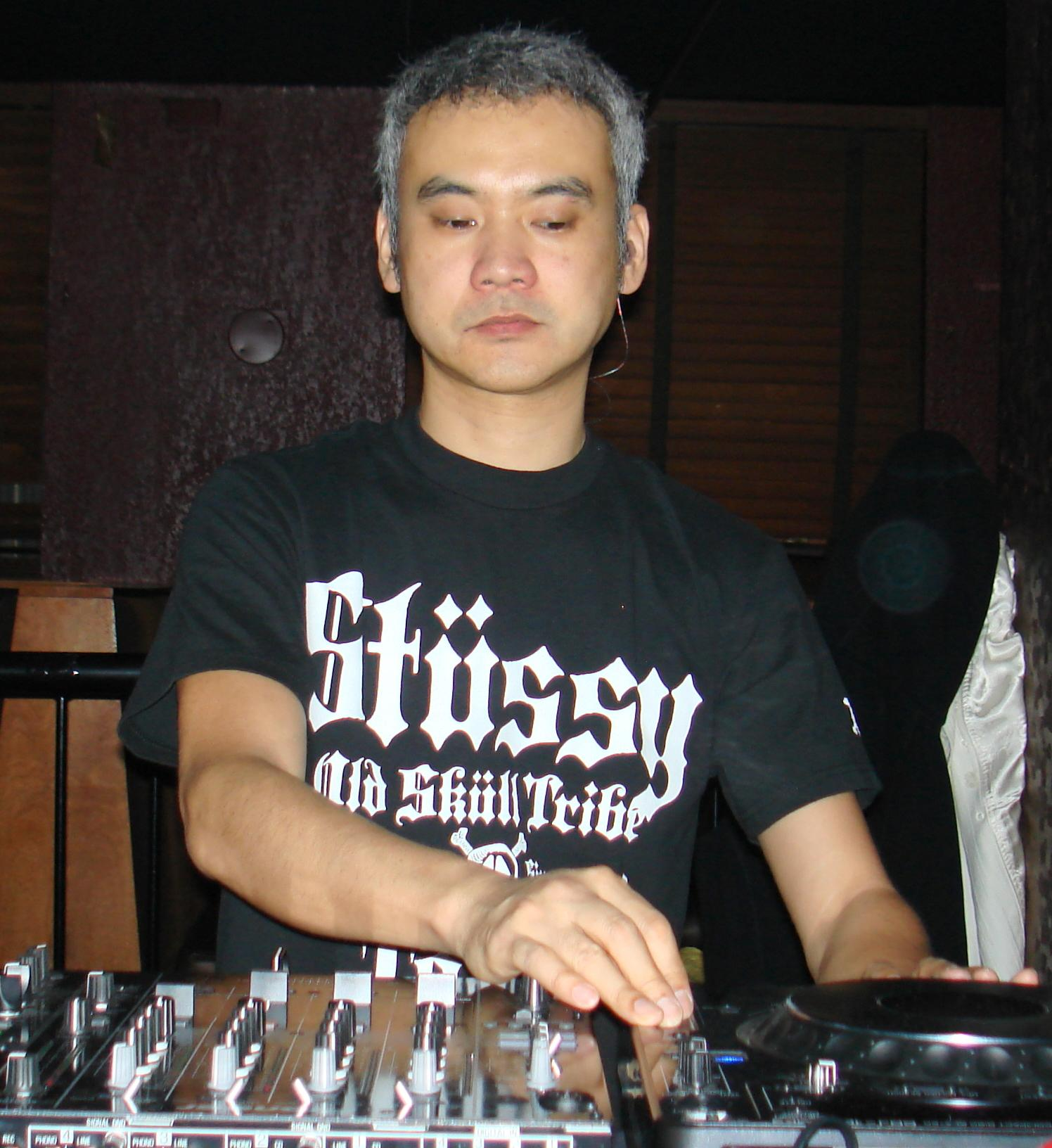
- Satoshi Tomiie in 2007

Background information
- Born: November 22, 1966 (age 59); Tokyo, Japan
- Genres: House
- Occupations: DJ, record producer
- Years active: 1984-present
- Labels: Abstract Architecture, Saw Recordings, C2, Columbia, SME Records
- Website: www.satoshitomiie.com

Satoshi Tomiie (富家 哲, Tomi'ie Satoshi; born November 22, 1966 in Tokyo, Japan) is a Japanese DJ and record producer.

== Biography ==
A lifelong student of jazz and classical piano, Satoshi had an influential impact from his very first record. His debut single "Tears", which he co-produced in 1989 with Chicago's "Godfather of House" Frankie Knuckles, was an instant club hit.

In the early 1990s, he toured and played keyboard for Japanese composer Ryuichi Sakamoto (of Yellow Magic Orchestra fame). His reputation for crafting meticulous club rhythms led to him remixing some of pop's biggest names including U2, Mariah Carey, Photek, Simply Red and David Bowie.

At the turn of the millennium, Satoshi introduced a new club sound via 2000's Full Lick album. The long-player featured dark twisted electronic rhythms, haunting vocals, and hypnotic grooves.

Another source of house music renovation, Satoshi and Hector Romero's record label SAW Recordings has continued to refine the Chicago and New York City house blueprint over the last 10 years.

== Discography ==
=== DJ mixes ===
- Renaissance: The Masters Series, Part 9 (2007)
- Global Underground: Nu Breed 6 box set (July 22, 2002)
- Cavo Paradiso
