= Danny Howells =

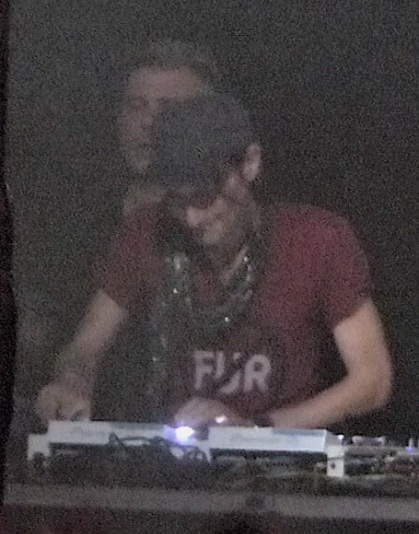
- Danny Howells (front) in 2017

Background information
- Born: 24 November 1970 (age 55)
- Origin: Hastings, England
- Genre: Electronic music
- Occupations: Disc jockey Record producer
- Years active: Late 1980s – present

Danny Howells (born 24 November 1970) is an English producer and DJ. His music is often described as progressive house, though he prefers to associate more with tech house and is sometimes described simply as "deepsexyfuturistictechfunkouse". At performances, he is well known to interact personally with the audience. Howells has mixed several albums for Global Underground in addition to his Nocturnal Frequencies series. Howells is also a member of the duo Science Department with Dick Trevor, which has produced the singles "Breathe" and "Persuasion"/"Repercussion" as well as remixes for artists such as BT. From 2008 he has run his own record label, Dig Deeper - named after his long running club night.

== Biography ==
Danny Howells was born in the South East England town of Hastings in 1970. Howells's first event DJing came in the late 1980s and he began to perform at local clubs. In 1991, Bedrock founder John Digweed heard one of Howells's mix tapes and invited Howells to join the Bedrock club nights. Howells traveled with Bedrock until they settled at the club Heaven in London. He would spend nine years as warm-up DJ for Digweed at Bedrock.

In 1995, Howells began producing experimental techno tracks with fellow Hastings native, Tim Cross, under the moniker Squelch. Over the next two years, Squelch produced several singles and attracted the attention of the record label Jackpot, who released what would be Cross's and Howells's final single together. In 1997, Cross and Howells split, though Howells stayed with Jackpot. Jackpot teamed Howells up with Rob Green to produce a remix of React 2 Rhythm's "Intoxication". Howells performed for the first time outside of the UK, traveling to the Netherlands for his first gig abroad, which gained him a large fan base there. Following his international tour, Howells signed with Dutch record label ID&T to create his debut mix album, Nightlife Report 1: Mick Boskamp Presents Danny Howells. Howells and Green continued to work together, including on a remix of Robbie Williams's "South of the Border". Howells began to produce solo as well, taking on projects such as Ashtrax's "Kafka" and BT's "Dreaming".

In 1999, Howells began his Nocturnal Frequencies series of mix albums on the record label Obsessive. He also began remixing with Dick Trevor, and the two soon adopted the name Science Department for their original productions. Howells continued his live DJing, playing regularly at clubs including Bedrock, Renaissance, Cream, and Ministry of Sound. After the release of his next Nocturnal Frequencies album, Howells left Bedrock and Ministry of Sound, taking a residency at Twilo in New York City. After finishing the Science Department track "Breathe", Howells compiled his next mix album Nubreed 002. The second entry in Global Underground's Nubreed series, Howells's album consisted largely of funky, progressive, tech house. Howells was voted number ten of the world's top DJs in DJ Magazine's 2001 Top 100 DJs poll.

Howells continued his relationship with Global Underground, releasing the first album in their 24:7 series in July 2003. The first disc features a primarily downtempo or chill out music, similarly to Nick Warren's Global Underground 024: Reykjavik, while the second is more of a club mix. In 2005, Global Underground brought in Howells for the 27th entry in their series. Howells entry, Global Underground 027: Miami, is based on his 31 October 2004 performance at Club Space in Miami, Florida. The first disc is based on his morning set and the second disc on his late night set. In 2008 he launched his own record label "Dig Deeper", initially as a means of showcasing his own productions, but more recently featuring many new and established artists. In 2011 he released the first compilation on this imprint, entitled "Phase One".

== Genre and style ==
Up until the late 1990s, DJs such as Howells allowed themselves to be categorised under genres like "deep trance". However, with the commercialisation of trance, Howells and others began to be classified as progressive house, tribal house, or tech house.

Howells is also known for his unique clothing styles, including wearing eye liner and "loud" Paisley shirts, which he buys from vintage stores or thrift shops.

== Selected discography ==
Albums

- 1998: Nightlife Report 1: Mick Boskamp Presents Danny Howells (ID&T)
- 1999: Nocturnal Frequencies (Obsessive)
- 1999: Danny Howells Presents Jackpot Records (Jackpot)
- 2000: Nocturnal Frequencies 2 (Obsessive)
- 2000: Nubreed 002 (Boxed)
- 2001: Renaissance: Revelation (Renaissance)
- 2001: Nocturnal Frequencies 3 (Obsessive)
- 2003: 24:7 (Boxed) (Billboard Top Electronic Albums #10)
- 2005: Global Underground 027: Miami (Global Underground Ltd.) (Billboard Top Electronic Albums #14)
- 2006: Choice - A Collection of Classics (Azuli Records)
- 2008: Renaissance: The Mix Collection (Renaissance)
- 2009: Dig Deeper: The New Label
- 2013: Balance 024(EQ Recordings)

Remixes

- Felix da Housecat - ("We All Wanna Be Prince") (2009)
