= James Holden (producer) =

English electronic musician

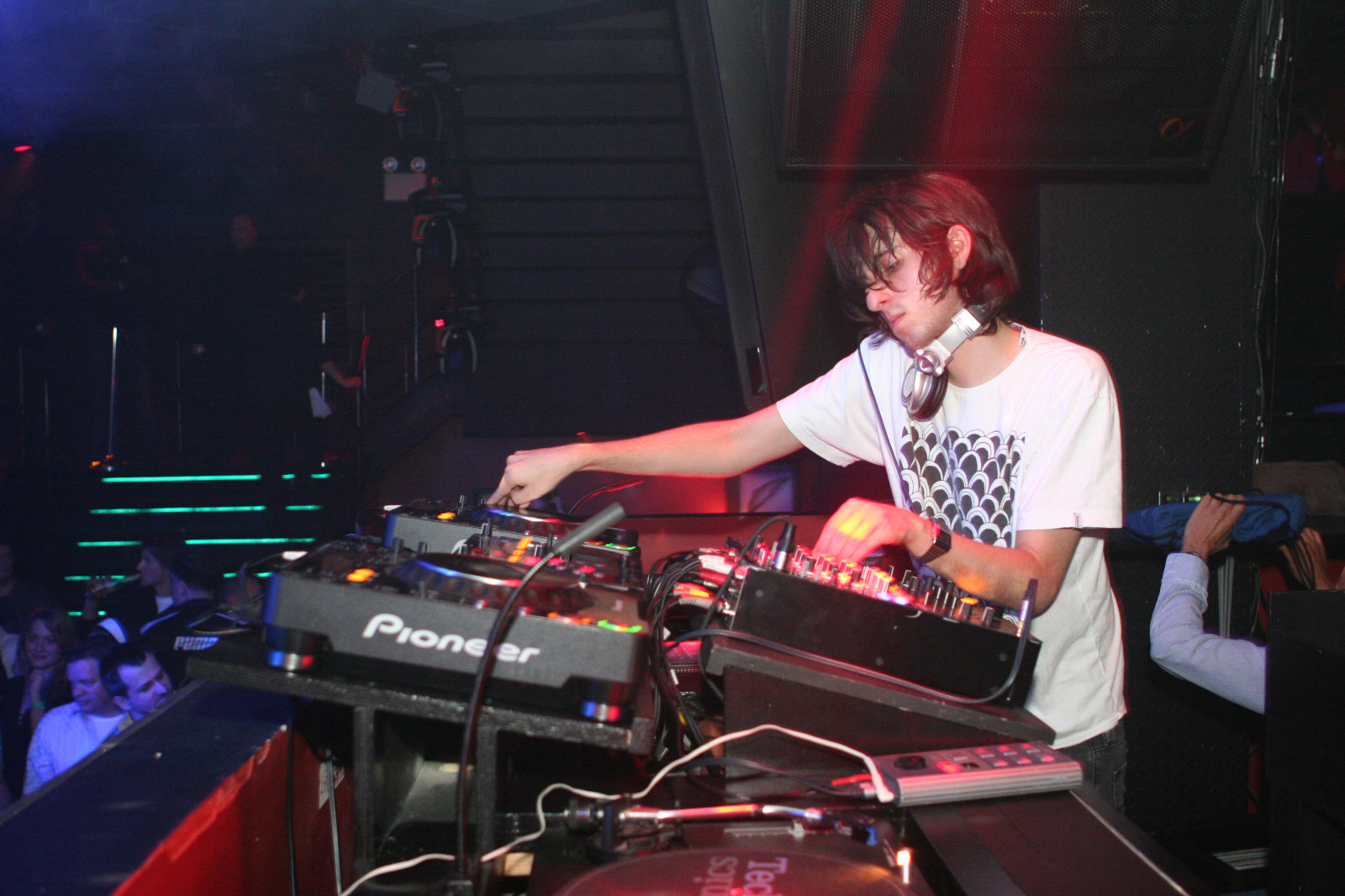
- Holden in 2006

Background information
- Also known as: Ariane, Holden
- Born: 7 June 1979 (age 47); Exeter, Devon, England
- Genres: IDM; electronic; trance; progressive electronic; minimal techno
- Occupations: DJ; record producer
- Years active: 1999–present
- Labels: EQ Recordings; Border Community; Loaded; Silver Planet
- Website: jamesholden.org

James Alexander Goodale Holden (born 7 June 1979) is an English electronic music artist and DJ. After beginning his career as a DJ and producer, Holden has moved extensively into live performance and founded his own record label, Border Community.

== Early career ==
Holden grew up in Market Bosworth, Leicestershire, and was first introduced to electronic music by a physics teacher at school. Holden studied mathematics at Oxford University.

He started his career in 1999 at age 19 and swiftly gained wider recognition with the release of trance single "Horizons", which he created with the freeware software Buzz. This "crossover anthem of the summer of 1999" was picked up by Pete Tong, John Digweed and Nick Warren, quickly propelling Holden to a wider audience.

In the subsequent years Holden released numerous singles and remixes on various labels including Lost Language, Perfecto Recordings, and Positiva Recordings. He was also one-third of Mainline (alongside Duncan Ellis and Hywel Dunn-Davies) and worked with singer Julie Thompson as Holden & Thompson. His remix credits for this period include artists such as Madonna, Britney Spears, Depeche Mode, New Order, Nathan Fake and Kieran Hebden & Steve Reid. In April 2006, his mix album James Holden At The Controls was Mixmag's 'Album of the Month'.

== Border Community ==
Holden's label Border Community was founded in 2003, and made its debut with Holden's single 'A Break in the Clouds'. Border Community has gone on to kickstart the careers of many young artists, including Nathan Fake, Fairmont, Luke Abbott and The MFA. James Holden often performed alongside his labelmates at his Border Community label nights at Corsica Studios in London.

His 2004 remix of Nathan Fake's "The Sky Was Pink" garnered attention for both Holden, Fake and Border Community. The track was described as containing "an epic universalism that fans of any genre coalesce around" and was placed at number 10 in the Resident Advisor 'Top 100 Electronic Tracks of the '00s'.

In 2006, Border Community released Holden's debut album The Idiots are Winning. This album of "loose, twisted and atmospheric...electronic music" was described by The Guardian as "the most astonishing debut in electronic music since Boards of Canada's Music Has the Right to Children.'

== Live performance ==
In 2013, Holden released his second album The Inheritors, a "revealing and intriguing" album of "buzzy pastoral beauty and harsh rhythmic duress". After the record's release, Thom Yorke invited Holden to support Yorke's band Atoms for Peace on their US tour. These shows consisted of Holden performing on modular synth alongside drummer Tom Page (of experimental electronic duo Rocketnumbernine and The Memory Band). This transition from DJing to live performance would be a significant development in Holden's career and would spark a long term musical relationship with Page.

The significance of Holden's embracing of live performance was clear to see in his third album, The Animal Spirits. Recorded at Holden's London studio Sacred Walls, the album saw Holden leading a five-piece band spanning live drums, saxophone, other woodwinds and North African instruments. This array of musicians allowed Holden to create a “spiritual jazz band playing folk / trance music” whilst keeping his "ever strident synth... front and centre". The music was recorded live, without edits or overdubs, and was influenced both in sound and concept by the works of Don Cherry, Alice Coltrane and Pharoah Sanders.

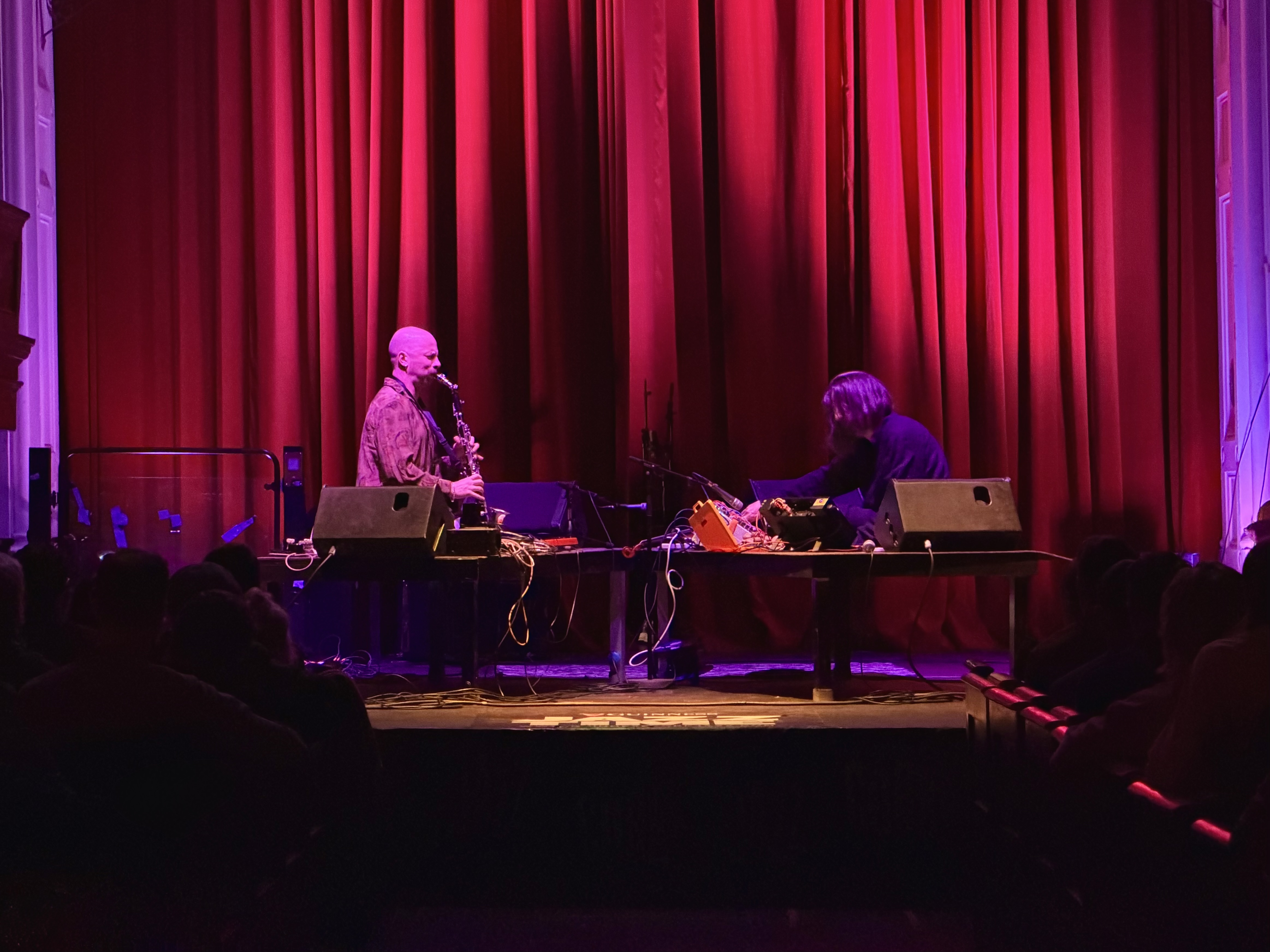
James Holden (on the right) performing with Wacław Zimpel in Triskel Arts Centre, Cork

== Collaborative releases ==
Animal Spirits also drew on Holden's immersion in Moroccan Gnawa music. In 2014, Holden travelled to Morocco for a week-long artistic residency to study and collaborate with the late master Mahmoud Guinia, culminating in the collaborative EP "Marhaba"; one of many that Holden would release in this period.

Other collaborative releases include Outdoor Museum of Fractals with Camilo Tirado, Three Live Takes with Houssam Gania and Long Weekend with Wacław Zimpel.

== Discography ==
=== Albums ===
- The Idiots Are Winning (2006, Border Community)
- The Inheritors (2013, Border Community)
- The Animal Spirits (2017, Border Community)
- A Cambodian Spring (2019, Border Community)
- Imagine This Is a High Dimensional Space of All Possibilities (2023, Border Community)

=== Collaborations ===
- Marhaba w/ Floating Points and Maalem Mahmoud Guinia (2015, Border Community)
- Outdoor Museum Of Fractals w/ Camilo Tirado (2016, Border Community)
- Three Live Takes EP w/Houssam Guinia (2018, Border Community)
- Long Weekend EP w/Waclaw Zimpel (2020, Border Community)
- The Universe Will Take Care of You w/Waclaw Zimpel (2025, Border Community)

=== Singles ===
- "Horizons" (INCredible)
- "One For You" (Direction Records, Silver Planet)
- "Solstice/I Have Put Out the Light" (Silver Planet)
- Holden & Thompson – "Nothing" (Loaded Records) – UK #51
- "A Break in the Clouds" (Border Community)
- Holden & Thompson – "Come To Me" (loaded)
- Milky Globe & James Holden – "Sun Spots" (LoEB)
- James Holden – "The Wheel" (Cocoon Recordings)
- "Renata" (Border Community)

=== Remixes ===
- 3 Phase feat. Dr. Motte – "Der Klang Der Familie" (James Holden Wet & Fucked Mix)
- Aaron-Carl – "Dance Naked" (James Holden Remix)
- Accadia – "Into the Dawn" (James Holden Remix)
- André Kraml – "Safari" (James Holden Remix)
- Avus – "Fancy Arse" (James Holden's Sunday Night Remix)
- Black Strobe – "Nazi Trance Fuck Off" (Holden Mix)
- Blue Amazon – "Breathe" (James Holden Remix)
- Blu Peter – "Funky Suite" (James Holden Remix)
- Britney Spears – "Breathe on Me" (Holden Dub)
- Britney Spears – "Breathe on Me" (Holden Vocal Mix)
- Caribou – "Bowls" (Holden Remix)
- The Coffee Boys – "The Touch" (James Holden Remix)
- Depeche Mode – "The Darkest Star" (James Holden Remix/Dub)
- Dextro – "Do You Need Help" (Holden Acoustic/Noise Tool)
- Electrique Boutique – "Revelation" (James Holden Remix)
- Joshua Ryan – "Pistolwhip" (James Holden Remix)
- Kieran Hebden and Steve Reid – "The Sun Never Sets" (Holden Remix)
- Kirsty Hawkshaw – "Fine Day" (James Holden Remix)
- Loki – "NYC Underground" (James Holden Inertia Remix)
- Madonna – "Get Together" (James Holden Mix)
- Meerkat – "Colours" (James Holden Re-edit)
- Mercury Rev – "Senses On Fire" (Holden Mix)
- Mogwai – "The Sun Smells Too Loud" (Holden Mix)
- Misstress Barbara – "Barcelona" (Holden Bass Tool)
- Misstress Barbara – "Barcelona" (Holden Bell Dub)
- Nathan Fake – "The Sky Was Pink" (Holden Remix)
- Nathan Fake – "The Sky Was Pink" (Holden Noise Tool)
- New Order – "Someone Like You" (James Holden Heavy Dub)
- Radiohead – "Reckoner" (Holden Mix)
- Roland Klinkenberg – "Inner Laugh" (James Holden Remix)
- Solid Sessions – "Janeiro" (James Holden Remix)
- System 7 – "Planet 7" (James Holden Remix)
- Timo Maas presents Mad Dogs – "Better Make Room" (James Holden Remix)
- Ultra Violet – "Heaven" (James Holden's Ariane Dub)
- Watergate – "Heart of Asia" (James Holden Remix)

=== Mix albums ===
- Fear of a Silver Planet (Silver Planet)
- Balance 005 (EQ (Grey))
- At the Controls (Resist Music)
- Dj-Kicks: James Holden (!K7)
