= Dependent and Happy =

Studio album by Ricardo Villalobos
- Released: August 29, 2012 (parts 1 & 2); September 5, 2012 (part 3); September 19, 2012 (CD); October 2012 (part 4)
- Genre: Techno
- Length: 78:22 (CD); 151:31 (LP)
- Label: Perlon
- Producer: Ricardo Villalobos

Ricardo Villalobos chronology
Re:ECM (2011)	Dependent and Happy (2012)

Dependent and Happy is the third studio album by Ricardo Villalobos. It was released by Perlon on LP and CD over three dates in August and September 2012. The album is Villalobos' first solo studio album since 2004's Thé au Harem d'Archimède; several previous albums have either been DJ mixes (2007's fabric36), compilations (2006's Salvador and 2008's Vasco) or collaborations (2011's Re:ECM, with Max Loderbauer).

Dependent and Happy was originally issued as five LP set, released in three parts: part one contained sides A-D; part two, sides E-H; and part three, sides I and J, a single vinyl release. Parts one and two were released on August 29, 2012, while part three followed on September 5. The CD pressing was released two weeks later, on September 19. The CD omits three songs and combines the remaining eleven songs into a DJ mix by Villalobos himself. Neither pressing will be issued digitally.

In October 2012, Villalobos released a fourth part of the album on vinyl, containing two additional songs and upping the album to a six LP set. Originally limited to 300 copies available only at Perlon pop-up stores, this fourth part has been repressed for wide release as of February 23, 2013. Both tracks are listed as sides K and L below.

"Koito" heavily samples "(Holon) Slo Motion" by Atom Heart, while "Two Kids Set Off" notably includes interviews and phonecalls related to the Columbine High School massacre.

Professional ratings
Review scores
Source	Rating
Dusted Magazine	Positive link
Pitchfork	8.2/10 link
Resident Advisor	link

== Track listing ==
All tracks are written by Ricardo Villalobos, except as noted.

CD pressing
No.	Title	Length
1.	"Mochnochich"	5:11
2.	"Timemorf"	7:16
3.	"Grumax" (Villalobos, Max Loderbauer)	5:05
4.	"Ferenc"	4:53
5.	"I'm Counting"	5:46
6.	"Put Your Lips"	7:34
7.	"Samma" (Villalobos, Loderbauer)	6:43
8.	"Tu Actitud" ("Your Attitude"; Villalobos, Washington Miranda)	9:00
9.	"Zuipox"	10:06
10.	"Koito" (Villalobos, Atom Heart)	12:00
11.	"Die schwarze Massai" ("The Black Maasai"; Villalobos, Loderbauer)	4:48

Vinyl pressing
Dependent and Happy – One

Side A
No.	Title	Length
1.	"Tu Actitud" ("Your Attitude"; Villalobos, Washington Miranda)	11:46

Side B
No.	Title	Length
1.	"Timemorf"	10:25

Side C
No.	Title	Length
1.	"Grumax" (Villalobos, Max Loderbauer)	5:13
2.	"I'm Counting"	6:35

Side D
No.	Title	Length
1.	"Das Leben ist so anders ohne dich" ("Life Is So Different Without You")	5:00
2.	"Mochnochich"	8:22

Dependent and Happy – Two

Side E
No.	Title	Length
1.	"Zuipox"	14:21

Side F
No.	Title	Length
1.	"Kehaus"	9:41
2.	"Die schwarze Massai" ("The Black Maasai"; Villalobos, Loderbauer)	4:52

Side G
No.	Title	Length
1.	"Put Your Lips"	11:01

Side H
No.	Title	Length
1.	"Samma" (Villalobos, Loderbauer)	9:05
2.	"Ferenc"	4:42

Dependent and Happy – Three

Side I
No.	Title	Length
1.	"Defixia"	13:13

Side J
No.	Title	Length
1.	"Koito" (Villalobos, Atom Heart)	12:30

Dependent and Happy – Four

Side K
No.	Title	Length
1.	"Precox"	11:21

Side L
No.	Title	Length
1.	"Two Kids Set Off"	13:18

== Credits ==
- Ricardo Villalobos – writer, producer, main performer
- Max Loderbauer – additional production on "Grumax", "Die Schwarze Massai" and "Samma"
- Atom Heart – additional production on "Koito"
- Andrew Gillings – vocals on "Put Your Lips"
- Oliver Weidenthaler – chair solo on "Put Your Lips"
- Rashad Becker – mastering
- Double Standard – sleeve artwork
