= Sasha (DJ) discography =

Sasha discography
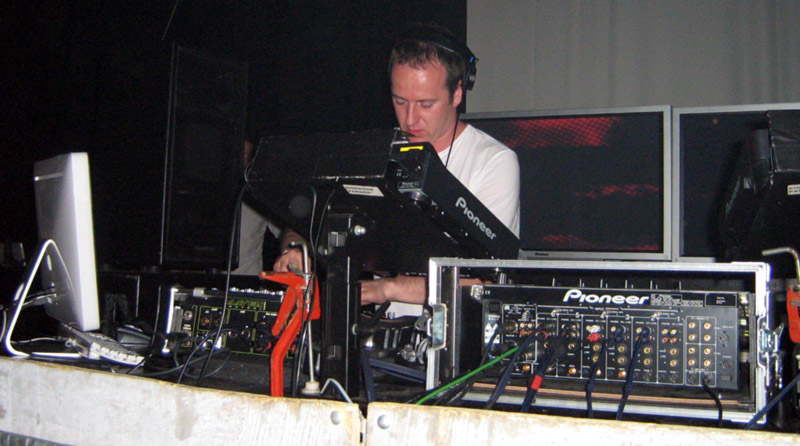
- Sasha using Ableton Live at a 15 July 2006 performance at Panama, an Amsterdam nightclub.
- Studio albums: 3
- Extended plays: 4
- Live albums: 2
- Compilation albums: 3
- Singles: 22
- Video albums: 1
- Mix albums: 13

This is a comprehensive discography of Welsh DJ and record producer Sasha. His discography comprises three studio albums, three compilation albums, two live albums, thirteen mix albums, four extended plays and twenty two singles. He has also released five mix albums and one video album with John Digweed as Sasha & John Digweed.

== Albums ==
=== Studio albums ===
Title	Information	Peak chart positions					
Title	Information	UK	UK Dance	AUS	US	US Dance	US Heat
The Qat Collection	Released: 23 August 1994; Label: Deconstruction; Format: CD, digital download, vinyl	56	—	—	—	—	—
Airdrawndagger	Released: 5 August 2002; Label: BMG, Kinetic; Format: CD, cassette, digital download, vinyl	18	—	78	157	5	5
Scene Delete	Released: 1 April 2016; Label: Late Night Tales; Format: CD, digital download, vinyl	34	3	—	—	6	—
"—" denotes a recording that did not chart or was not released in that territory.

=== Compilation albums ===
Title	Information
The Remixes	Released: 1993; Label: Arctic; Format: Cassette
The emFire Collection: Mixed, Unmixed & Remixed	Released: 14 April 2008; Label: emFire; Format: CD, digital download
Scene Delete: The Remixes	Released: 19 May 2017; Label: Late Night Tales; Format: CD, digital download, vinyl

=== Live albums ===
Title	Information
Avalon Los Angeles CA 24/06/06	Released: 24 June 2006; Label: Instant Live; Format: CD, digital download
Refracted: Live	Released: 3 October 2017; Label: Late Night Tales; Format: Blu-ray, digital download, vinyl

=== Mix albums ===
Title	Information	Peak chart positions							Certifications (sales thresholds)
Title	Information	UK	UK Dance	UK Comp	US	US Dance	US Heat	US Ind	Certifications (sales thresholds)
DJ Culture (with Dave Seaman)	Released: 1993; Label: Stress; Format: CD	—	—	60	—	—	—	—	
Essential Mix (with Pete Tong, Carl Cox and Paul Oakenfold)	Released: 23 November 1995; Label: FFRR; Format: CD, cassette	—	—	22	—	—	—	—	BPI: Gold
Global Underground 009: San Francisco	Released: 9 November 1998; Label: Global Underground; Format: CD, digital download	—	—	18	—	—	—	—	
Global Underground 013: Ibiza	Released: 28 December 1999; Label: Global Underground; Format: CD, digital download	—	—	—	—	—	—	—	
Involver	Released: 14 Jun 2004; Label: Global Underground; Format: CD, digital download, vinyl	61	7	—	200	1	9	14	
Fundacion NYC	Released: 13 June 2005; Label: Global Underground; Format: CD, digital download, vinyl	—	3	33	—	4	28	37	
Invol2ver	Released: 8 September 2008; Label: Global Underground; Format: CD, digital download	—	1	19	—	9	10	40	
Involv3r	Released: 18 March 2013; Label: Ministry of Sound; Format: CD, digital download, vinyl	—	1	6	—	23	44	—	
Luzoscura	Released: 7 May 2021; Label: Alkaane; Format: CD, digital download, vinyl	—	—	27	—	—	—	—	
"—" denotes a recording that did not chart or was not released in that territory.

== Extended plays ==
Title	Information	Charts	
Title	Information	UK	IRL
Xpander	Released: 5 July 1999; Label: Deconstruction; Format: CD, digital download, vinyl	18	30
Highlife (vs. Adam Parker)	Released: 10 May 2009; Label: Renaissance; Format: Digital download, vinyl	—	—
The Midnight Eclipse (with Charlie May)	Released: 3 January 2010; Label: Renaissance; Format: Digital download	—	—
Bring On the Night (with James Teej)	Released: 12 March 2012; Label: Last Night on Earth; Format: Digital download	—	—
"—" denotes a recording that did not chart or was not released in that territory.

== Singles ==
Title	Year	Peak chart positions				Album
Title	Year	UK	UK Dance	IRL	NED	Album
"Someday" (with M People)	1992	—	—	—	—	Non-album singles
"Together" (with Danny Campbell)	1993	57	—	—	—	Non-album singles
"Higher Ground" (with Sam Mollison)	1994	19	—	—	—	The Qat Collection
"Magic" (with Sam Mollison)	1994	32	11	—	—	The Qat Collection
"Arkham Asylum"	1996	—	—	—	—	Non-album singles
"Be as One" (with Maria Nayler)	1996	17	1	—	—	Non-album singles
"Scorchio" (with Darren Emerson)	2000	23	1	26	88	Non-album singles
"Wavy Gravy"	2002	64	4	—	—	Airdrawndagger
"Artificial Heart"	2003	—	—	—	—	Non-album singles
"Seal Clubbing" (with Charlie May)	2006	—	—	—	—	Non-album singles
"Coma"	2007	—	—	—	—	The emFire Collection: Mixed, Unmixed & Remixed
"Park It in the Shade"	2007	—	—	—	—	The emFire Collection: Mixed, Unmixed & Remixed
"Mongoose"	2007	—	—	—	—	The emFire Collection: Mixed, Unmixed & Remixed
"Who Killed Sparky"	2008	—	—	—	—	The emFire Collection: Mixed, Unmixed & Remixed
"3 Little Piggys"	2008	—	—	—	—	Invol2ver
"Cut Me Down" (featuring Krister Linder)	2011	—	—	—	—	Non-album singles
"Smoke Cone" (featuring Kastis Torrau, Donatello, Arnas D and Knox)	2012	—	—	—	—	Non-album singles
"Ether"	2015	—	—	—	—	Non-album singles
"Vapourspace"	2015	—	—	—	—	Non-album singles
"View2"	2016	—	—	—	—	Scene Delete
"Warewolf"	2016	—	—	—	—	Scene Delete
"Bring on the Night-Time" (featuring Ultraista)	2016	—	—	—	—	Scene Delete
"Pontiac"	2016	—	—	—	—	Scene Delete
"Rivaldo"	2016	—	—	—	—	Non-album singles
"Out of Time" (featuring Poliça)	2017	—	—	—	—	Non-album singles
"GameOvr"	2017	—	—	—	—	Non-album singles
"Xpander: Refracted"	2017	—	—	—	—	Refracted: Live
"True" (featuring Dems)	2017	—	—	—	—	Non-album singles
"El Jefe" (with Alan Fitzpatrick)	2017	—	—	—	—	Non-album singles
"Singularity"	2018	—	—	—	—	Non-album singles
"HNDI"	2021	—	—	—	—	Luzoscura
"—" denotes a recording that did not chart or was not released in that territory.
