= San Proper =

Dutch electronic music producer

San Proper is an electronic music producer and DJ based in Amsterdam. His work is characterized by a diverse mix of different genres, and has been released on the record labels Rush Hour, Perlon, and Dekmantel.

== Beginnings ==
San Proper grew up in Amsterdam playing in many bands, with guitar as his primary instrument. In 1995, he founded The Mindmenders, a six-person band that fuzed influences from R&B, Funk, and Hip Hop. After gaining considerable popularity and even winning the prestigious Grote Prijs van Nederland (Grand Prize of the Netherlands), Proper left the group to pursue his a solo career. After leaving The Mindmenders, Proper started DJing in clubs in Amsterdam and experimenting with analogue equipment to create his own music. His unpredictable DJ sets, as well as eccentric presence, built a strong local following in the early 2000s.

== Rush Hour, Perlon, and Animal LP ==
After becoming friendly with members of local independent record label Rush Hour Recordings, he began his Proper A’dam Family Series for the label in 2007 to showcase up and coming talent from his home city. The first of five in the series, a collaboration with Awanto 3, caught the attention of Ricardo Villalobos and Zip of the label Perlon, who asked him to remix “Electronic Water” for Villalobos' LP Vasco. After signing to the label, San Proper released Keep It Raw in 2009.

San Proper toured DJ sets extensively through the 2010s, making appearances at the festivals Mysteryland, Mutek and Sónar. In 2011, he took a hiatus from touring to focus on his first LP. "Animal" was released by Rush Hour the following year. The album was praised for its diversity of styles, including Funk, Jazz, and Psychedelia, as well as 'live' feel. After touring in support of the album with his new live band, Proper returned to Amsterdam to become a resident DJ at newspaper plant turned nightclub Trouw. Between his residency, collaborations with fellow locals like Tom Trago, and hosting duty of his show for Red Light Radio, San Proper continues to be a fixture of the Amsterdam House Music scene.
