= Leave Luck to Heaven =

Studio album by Matthew Dear
- Released: November 25, 2003
- Genre: Electronica; minimal techno; microhouse
- Length: 53:54
- Label: Spectral Sound
- Producer: Matthew Dear

Matthew Dear chronology
Leave Luck to Heaven (2003)	Backstroke (2004)

Leave Luck to Heaven is the first studio album by Matthew Dear. It was released on Spectral Sound, a sub-label of Ghostly International, in 2003.

== Critical reception ==
Professional ratings
Review scores
Source	Rating
AllMusic	4.5/5 stars
BBC	7/10
Dusted Magazine	favorable
Pitchfork	7.8/10
Prefix	7.0/10
Stylus Magazine	C+
XLR8R	favorable

Andy Kellman of AllMusic gave the album 4.5 stars out of 5, saying, "Formatted like a pop record intended for home listening, with most tracks falling somewhere in the four- to five-minute range, Leave Luck to Heaven has a flow unlike any other single-artist microhouse album to date." Scott Plagenhoef of Pitchfork gave the album a 7.8 out of 10, calling it "his most satisfying release to date" and "(along with Ricardo Villalobos' Alcachofa) another techno-dub record that deftly straddles the line between home listening and the dancefloor."

== Track listing ==
All tracks are written by Matthew Dear.

No.	Title	Length
1.	"Nervous Laughter (Intro)"	2:40
2.	"Fex"	5:07
3.	"Just Us Now"	4:37
4.	"The Crush"	4:42
5.	"But for You"	5:13
6.	"In Unbending"	4:34
7.	"Dog Days"	5:53
8.	"Huffing Stuff"	5:18
9.	"Reason and Responsibility"	5:38
10.	"You're Fucking Crazy"	4:43
11.	"It's Over Now"	5:42
12.	"Machete (Outro)"	0:27
Total length:		53:54

== Personnel ==
Credits adapted from liner notes.

- Matthew Dear – production
- SV4 – executive production
- Rashad – mastering
- Michael Doyle – design
- Will Calcutt – photography
