= Asa Breed =

Studio album by Matthew Dear
- Released: June 5, 2007
- Genre: Electronic
- Length: 40:51
- Label: Ghostly International
- Producer: Matthew Dear

Matthew Dear chronology
Backstroke (2004)	Asa Breed (2007)	Black City (2010)

Asa Breed is the third studio album by American music producer Matthew Dear. It was released via Ghostly International in 2007. It peaked at number 20 on the Billboard Top Dance/Electronic Albums chart. The title of the album comes from a character in the Kurt Vonnegut novel, Cat's Cradle.

== Critical reception ==
Professional ratings
Aggregate scores
Source	Rating
Metacritic	73/100
Review scores
Source	Rating
AllMusic	3/5 stars
The A.V. Club	B−
Entertainment Weekly	B
The Guardian	3/5 stars
The Irish Times	4/5 stars
NME	7/10
Pitchfork	7.9/10
PopMatters	8/10
Resident Advisor	4.0/5
Spin	3.5/5 stars

At Metacritic, which assigns a weighted average score out of 100 to reviews from mainstream critics, Asa Breed received an average score of 73, based on 15 reviews, indicating "generally favorable reviews".

Resident Advisor named it the 39th-best album of the decade.

== Track listing ==
All tracks are written by Matthew Dear.

No.	Title	Length
1.	"Fleece on Brain"	4:15
2.	"Neighborhoods"	3:10
3.	"Deserter"	3:55
4.	"Shy"	3:44
5.	"Elementary Lover"	3:19
6.	"Don and Sherri"	3:25
7.	"Will Gravity Win Tonight?"	2:41
8.	"Pom Pom"	2:39
9.	"Death to Feelers"	2:47
10.	"Give Me More"	2:41
11.	"Midnight Lovers"	4:28
12.	"Good to Be Alive"	3:47
13.	"Vine to Vine" (not included on vinyl edition)	3:31
Total length:		40:51

Asa Breed (Black Edition) bonus tracks
No.	Title	Length
14.	"Deserter" (Four Tet Remix)	5:45
15.	"Don and Sherri" (Hot Chip Version)	4:17
16.	"You Know What I Would Do"	2:29
17.	"Down on You" (digital edition exclusive)	5:14
Total length:		56:55

== Personnel ==
Credits adapted from liner notes.

- Matthew Dear – production
- Mobius Band – guitar (5), bass guitar (5)
- Collin Dupuis – drums (11), drones (11), selected recording
- Dave Cooley – mixing (2, 3, 5, 8, 10, 11)
- Tony Gillis – mastering
- Sam Valenti IV – executive production
- Will Calcutt – artwork

== Charts ==
Chart (2007)	Peak position
US Top Dance/Electronic Albums (Billboard)	20
