= Alcachofa =

Alcachofa may refer to:

- The Spanish word for Artichoke
- Alcachofa (album), an album by Ricardo Villalobos
