= Ignis (album) =

Studio album by Paul Giger
- Released: 2000
- Recorded: June 1998
- Studio: Niguliste Church; Tallinn, Estonia
- Genre: Medieval music; contemporary classical music
- Length: 72:41
- Label: ECM; ECM 1681
- Producer: Manfred Eicher

Paul Giger chronology
Schattenwelt (1993)	Ignis (2000)	Vindonissa (2003)

Ignis is the fourth album by Swiss violinist and composer Paul Giger, recorded at St. Nicholas Church, Tallinn, Estonia in June 1998 and released on ECM in 2000.

== Reception ==
Professional ratings
Review scores
Source	Rating
AllMusic	4/5 stars

The AllMusic review by Mark W. B. Allender awarded the album 4 stars stating "The pieces on Ignis form a body of old-world sacred music with an avant-garde sensibility."

== Track listing ==
All compositions by Paul Giger except as indicated

1. "Organum" (Anonymous) – 6:26
2. "Karma Shadub" – 21:01
3. "Tropus" (Notker Balbulus, Tuotilo) – 14:00
4. "Alleluja" (Notker Balbulus, Tuotilo) – 3:31
5. "O Ignis" (Hildegard von Bingen) – 27:43

=== Note ===
- In 2011, Ricardo Villalobos and Max Loderbauer used samples of Ignis as the basis for the track "Reshadub" on the remix album Re:ECM.

== Personnel ==
- Paul Giger – violin, viola d'amore
- Marius Ungureanu – viola (tracks 1 & 3–5)
- Beat Schneider – cello (tracks 1 & 3–5)
- Tõnu Kaljuste – conductor (tracks 2–5)
  - Estonian Philharmonic Chamber Choir
