= Tati (album) =

Studio album by Enrico Rava
- Released: 4 October 2005
- Recorded: November 2004
- Studio: Avatar (New York, New York)
- Genre: Jazz
- Length: 54:49
- Label: ECM; ECM 1921
- Producer: Manfred Eicher

Enrico Rava chronology
Montreal Diary/B (2004)	Tati (2005)	Chanson (2005)

Tati is an album by jazz trumpeter and composer Enrico Rava recorded in November 2004 and released on ECM October the following year. The trio features Stefano Bollani on piano and Paul Motian on drums.

In 2011, Ricardo Villalobos and Max Loderbauer used samples of Tati as the basis for the track "Rebird" on the remix album Re:ECM.

== Reception ==
The AllMusic review by Michael G. Nastos awarded the album 3½ stars stating "On what is certainly a late-night offering for most listeners, Rava and friends have provided a beautiful organic dream of a recording, appropriate for various dining, resting, or romantic activities when the sun goes down and the breeze is nil."

Professional ratings
Review scores
Source	Rating
Allmusic	3.5/5 stars
The Penguin Guide to Jazz Recordings	3.5/4 stars

== Track listing ==
All compositions by Enrico Rava except as indicated

1. "The Man I Love" (George Gershwin) – 6:01
2. "Birdsong" (Paul Motian) – 2:19
3. "Tati" – 4:40
4. "Casa di Bambola" (Stefano Bollani) – 3:45
5. "E Lucevan le Stelle" (Giacomo Puccini) – 5:40
6. "Mirrors" – 5:56
7. "Jessica Too" – 3:57
8. "Golden Eyes" – 4:26
9. "Fantasm" (Motian) – 4:06
10. "Cornettology" – 6:36
11. "Overboard" – 3:09
12. "Gang of 5" (Motian) – 4:07

== Personnel ==
- Enrico Rava – trumpet
- Stefano Bollani – piano
- Paul Motian – drums
