= Vasco (album) =

EP by Ricardo Villalobos
- Released: May 26, 2008 (part 1); September 8, 2008 (part 2); October 6, 2008 (CD)
- Genre: Minimal techno, microhouse
- Length: 70:04 (CD); 66:50 (2xLP)
- Label: Perlon; PERL 69-1; PERL 69²; PERL 69CD
- Producer: Ricardo Villalobos

Ricardo Villalobos chronology
Enfants
(2008)
Vasco
(2008)
Re:ECM
(2011
)

EP covers
- Part one

Alternative cover
- Part two

Vasco is a two-part EP by Ricardo Villalobos. It was released by Perlon on LP and CD in the spring and fall of 2008. The original 12" vinyl pressings include "Minimoonstar", "Electronic Water" and "Amazordum", alongside remixes of each song by Shackleton, San Proper and Baby Ford. The CD release discards the remixes, but adds "Skinfummel" and the full 32 minutes of "Minimoonstar", extending the song by over twice its length.

Professional ratings
Review scores
Source	Rating
Dusted Magazine	Positive link
Pitchfork Media	(7.2/10) link
Resident Advisor	link

== Track listing ==
Vinyl pressing - Part One

All tracks are written by Ricardo Villalobos, except as noted.

Side A
No.	Title	Length
1.	"Minimoonstar"	13:10

Side B
No.	Title	Length
1.	"Minimoonstar (Shackleton remix)"	9:46

Side C
No.	Title	Length
1.	"Electronic Water"	12:57

Side D
No.	Title	Length
1.	"Electronic Water (San Proper's 'It Ate My Quarter' mix)"	8:23

Vinyl pressing - Part Two

Side A
No.	Title	Length
1.	"Amazordum"	12:03

Side B
No.	Title	Length
1.	"Amazordum (Baby Ford remix)"	10:31

CD pressing

No.	Title	Length
1.	"Minimoonstar (full session)"	31:43
2.	"Electronic Water"	12:58
3.	"Amazordum"	12:06
4.	"Skinfummel"	13:17

== Credits ==
- Ricardo Villalobos - writer, producer, main performer
- Rashad Becker - mastering
- Double Standard - sleeve artwork
