= Matthew Dear =

American music producer, DJ and artist

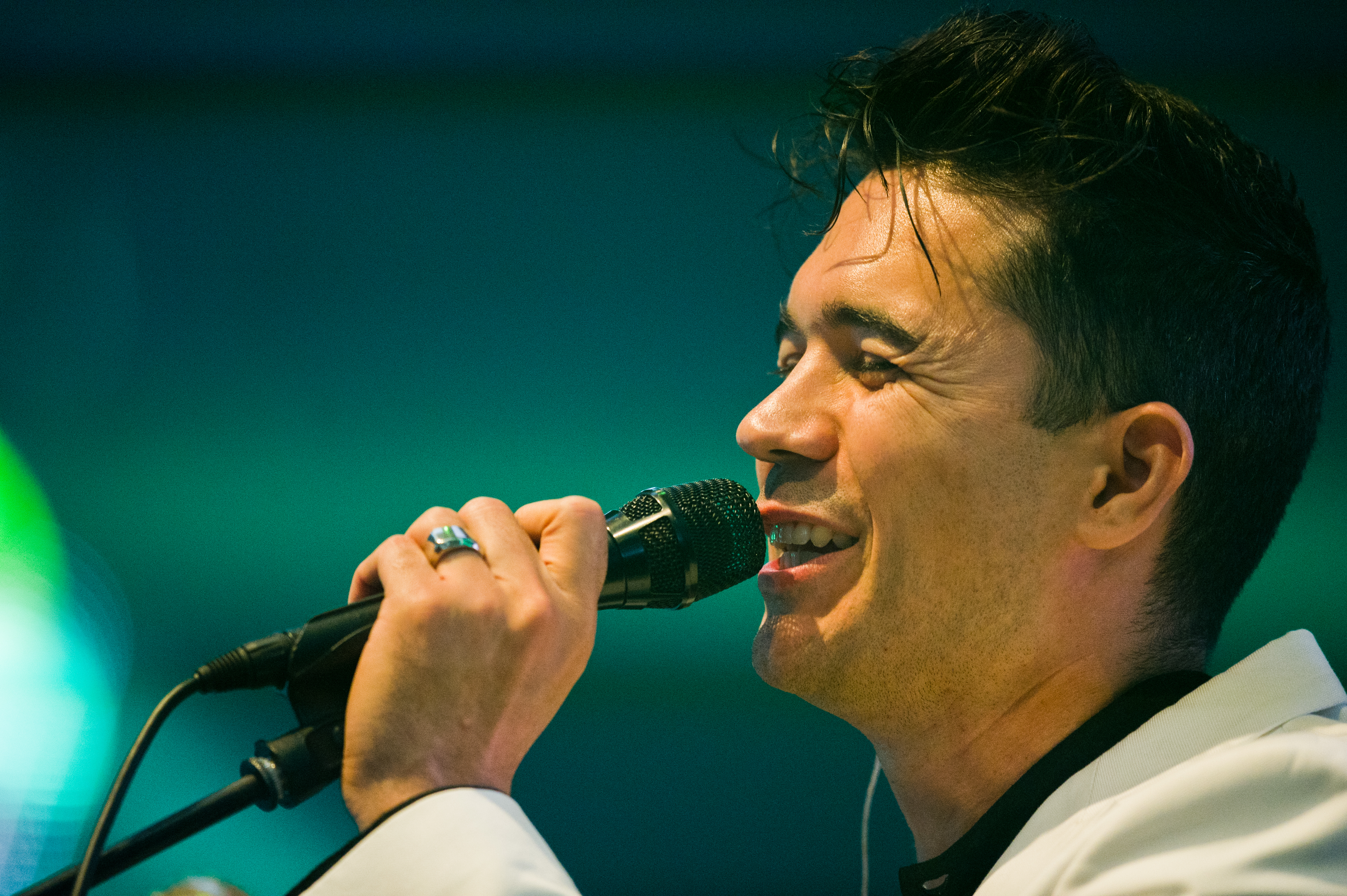
- Dear performing at Roskilde Festival, 2011.

Background information
- Also known as: False, Audion, Jabberjaw
- Born: April 4, 1979 (age 46); Kingsville, Texas, United States
- Origin: Detroit, Michigan
- Genres: Synth-pop; indietronica; microhouse; tech house; avant-pop; techno
- Occupations: Producer; DJ
- Years active: 1999–present
- Labels: Ghostly International; Spectral Sound; Minus; Perlon; Plus 8
- Website: matthewdear.com

Matthew Dear (born April 4, 1979) is an American electronic music producer and DJ.

== History ==
Texas-born Dear moved to Michigan as a teenager, where he was inspired by the sound of Detroit techno. Dear met Sam Valenti IV at a party while attending the University of Michigan, after which the two started the record label, Ghostly International, based on a shared love of electronic music. Dear's first single was 1999's "Hands Up For Detroit" (co-produced by ghettotech pioneer Disco D, who performed under the name Daisha). Successive singles, such as "Stealing Moves" and the chart-topping "Mouth to Mouth" (as Audion) were issued on Spectral Sound, Ghostly's offshoot that focuses on dancefloor music.

Dear's first album Leave Luck to Heaven appeared in 2003 and was praised widely as a seminal fusion of pop and minimal techno. The album's single "Dog Days" became one of Spectral's best sellers and a favorite of international DJs like Richie Hawtin.

Dear followed the album with Backstroke in 2004 and has also begun working under the harder-edged Audion alias, apart from additional monikers False and Jabberjaw.

In 2007, Dear released his sophomore full-length, Asa Breed. Matthew and his band, Matthew Dear's Big Hands, then began a US promotional tour and a European tour as the opening act for Hot Chip. 2008 saw the re-release of Asa Breed as the Asa Breed Black Edition. This re-release added 5 new songs, including a remix of Don and Sherri from Hot Chip and the video for the song, shot in downtown New York City.

In 2011, Dear opened for Interpol, performing on their first three dates in the UK.

Dear's fourth album, Black City, was released on August 17, 2010. It conceptualizes a futuristic metropolis that never sleeps. Dear describes 'Black City': "Well, there's a kind of timelessness to it in the sense that I don't want things to run on a 24-hour clock. It seems like a city that's always awake, maybe always dialed in electronically, and cannot be turned off. It's this imaginary weird never-sleeping town. But yeah it's full of lust, and love, and dark shadows. Weird things around the corner…" Black City was met with near-unanimous critical praise, earning top marks from Mojo, Uncut, Q, URB, and the Village Voice, ending up on countless year-end lists, and earning Pitchfork's Best New Music nod. A worldwide tour followed.

On stage, Dear performs with a multi-pieced live band. They have supported Interpol, Hot Chip and Depeche Mode on their world tours.

Dear revived his Audion alias in 2013, celebrating the tenth anniversary of the first Audion release with a compilation, Audion X, and a series of new singles and DJ performances leading up to the release of the second Audion album, Alpha, in 2016. In early 2017 he released an entry into the well-regarded DJ-KiCKS mix series, along with his first single under his own name in five years, "Wrong With Us". The song was produced during a writing and recording session with the English duo Simian Mobile Disco, which also yielded several other songs. In June, he released "Modafinil Blues", the first single from his upcoming album, and announced tour dates, where he will be performing without a band for the first time.

== Influences ==
Dear has listed Talking Heads, David Bowie, Adonis, Nitzer Ebb, and Roman Flügel as inspirations.

When asked who he is influenced by Dear replied, "Definitely I'm influenced by Brian Eno and a lot of his work. I've said it before but he is one that is so interesting to listen to on all formats whether it be his production with other bands, whether it's his solo work or whether it's his collaboration work with other artists. He's probably the number one."

== Discography ==
=== As Matthew Dear ===
==== Solo ====
Albums

- 2003 Leave Luck to Heaven (Spectral Sound)
- 2004 Backstroke (Spectral Sound)
- 2007 Asa Breed (Ghostly International)
- 2008 Asa Breed Black Edition (Ghostly International)
- 2010 Black City (Ghostly International)
- 2012 Beams (Ghostly International)
- 2018 Bunny (Ghostly International)
- 2021 Preacher's Sigh & Potion: Lost Album (Ghostly International)

EPs

- 2003 EP1 (Spectral Sound)
- 2003 EP2 (Spectral Sound)
- 2007 Don and Sherri (Ghostly International)
- 2012 Headcage

Singles

- 2000 Irreparably Dented (Spectral Sound)
- 2001 Stealing Moves (Spectral Sound)
- 2003 Dog Days (Spectral Sound)
- 2004 Anger Management / Future Never Again (Spectral Sound)
- 2007 Deserter (Ghostly International)
- 2008 Free To Ask (Get Physical)
- 2008 Pom Pom (Ghostly International)
- 2013 Pale Shelter [with Tegan and Sara]
- 2017 Wrong With Us (DJ-KiCKS) [with Simian Mobile Disco] (!K7)
- 2017 Modafinil Blues (Ghostly International)
- 2017 Bad Ones [feat Tegan and Sara]

Compilations

- 2008 Beginning of the End: Spectral Sound Singles (Spectral Sound)

Mixes

- 2008 Body Language Vol. 7 (Get Physical)
- 2008 BBC Essential Mix (BBC)
- 2012 RA.306 (Resident Advisor)
- 2017 DJ-Kicks (!K7)

==== Tracks featured on ====
- 1999 Hands Up For Detroit (Ghostly International)
- 2003 Idol Tryouts: Ghostly International Vol. 1 (Ghostly International)
- 2003 State of the Union EP (Spectral Sound)
- 2005 Spectral Sound Vol. 1 (Spectral Sound)
- 2006 Idol Troyouts: Ghostly International Vol. 2 (Ghostly International)
- 2007 Chuck (TV series) Season 1, Episode 4 (NBC)
- 2007 "Gossip Girls (TV series) Season 1, Episode 1"
- 2008 Life Beyond Mars: Bowie Covered
- 2015 "Undercover" (Lane 8) [Anjunadeep]

==== Remixing ====
- 2004 DJ Minx A Walk In The Park (M_nus)
- 2004 Håkan Lidbo Clockwise Rmxs (Shitkatapult)
- 2004 L'usine Flat Remixes (Ghostly International)
- 2004 Monobox The Remixes (Logistic Records)
- 2004 Osborne Bout Ready to Jak Remixes (Spectral Sound)
- 2004 Someone Else + Miskate Rip It Cookie Muenster EP (Foundsound)
- 2005 Circlesquare / Colder 7 Minutes / Shiny Star (Remixes) (Output)
- 2005 The Postal Service We Will Become Silhouettes (Sub Pop)
- 2006 Hot Chip No Fit State (EMI)
- 2006 The Chemical Brothers Do it Again (EMI)
- 2007 Black Strobe "I'm a Man" (Playlouder)
- 2007 Terence Fixmer "Electrostatic" (Planete Rouge)
- 2007 Dubfire "I Feel Speed" (SCI + TEC Digital Audio)
- 2008 Matt John "Olga Dancekowski" (Bar25)
- 2008 Sasha "Park It In The Shade" (emFire)
- 2008 Kieran Hebden, Steve Reid "People Be Happy/Rhythm Dance" (Domino)
- 2008 Spoon "Don't You Evah" (Merge Records)
- 2008 Liquid Liquid "Optimo" (Domino Records)
- 2009 The Juan MacLean "Happy House" (DFA Records)
- 2010 The XX "VCR" (XL Recordings, Young Turks)
- 2010 Charlotte Gainsbourg "Time Of The Assassins" (Because Music)
- 2010 The Drums "Me And The Moon" (Moshi Moshi/Island)
- 2012 Ultraísta "Smalltalk" (Temporary Residence Ltd.)
- 2013 Depeche Mode "Heaven" (Columbia Records)
- 2013 Kylie Minogue "Skirt" (Rising Music)
- 2017 Tourist "We Stayed Up All Night" (Monday Records)
- 2018 MGMT "Little Dark Age (Matthew Dear Album Remix)" (Columbia Records)

=== As Audion ===
Singles & EPs

- 2004 Kisses EP (Audion I, Spectral Sound)
- 2004 The Pong EP (Audion II, Spectral Sound)
- 2005 Just Fucking (Audion III, Spectral Sound)
- 2006 Mouth to Mouth (Audion V, Spectral Sound)
- 2006 Just a Man / Just a Woman [with Ellen Allien] (Audion VI, Spectral Sound)
- 2007 Mouth to Mouth (Remixes) (Audion R1, Spectral Sound)
- 2007 Noiser/Fred's Bells (Audion VII, Spectral Sound)
- 2008 Billy Says Go (Audion VIII, Spectral Sound)
- 2009 I Am The Car (Audion IX.I, Spectral Sound)
- 2009 Look At The Moon (Audion IX.II, Spectral Sound)
- 2009 It's Full of Blinding Light EP (Audion IX.III and X, Spectral Sound)
- 2009 Stoplight (Audion IX.IV, Spectral Sound)
- 2009 Instant In You (Audion IX.V, Spectral Sound)
- 2009 That's That (Audion IX.VI, Spectral Sound)
- 2009 Push (Audion IX.VII, Spectral Sound)
- 2010 Document Part 2 [with Mike Parker] (Spectral Sound)
- 2013 Sky (Spectral Sound)
- 2013 Mothermouth (Spectral Sound)
- 2013 Let's Go Dancing [with Tiga] (Turbo)
- 2014 Fever [with Tiga] (Turbo)
- 2014 Dem Howl [with Troels Abrahamsen] (Spectral Sound)

Albums

- 2005 Suckfish (Audion IV, Spectral Sound)
- 2016 Alpha (!K7)

Compilations

- 2013 Audion X (Spectral Sound)
- 2016 Mouth to Mouth 10 (Spectral Sound)

Mixes

- 2006 Fabric 27 (Fabric)
- 2016 BBC Essential Mix (BBC)

=== As Jabberjaw ===
- 2003 Girlfriend (Perlon)
- 2009 The Connie Shake (Spectral Sound)
- 2009 The Garden Of Eden (Spectral Sound)

=== As False ===
Singles/EPs:

- 2002 .WAV Pool (Plus 8)
- 2002 Warsaw Bread (Plus 8)
- 2003 You Wouldn't/Beginner's Luck(Plus 8)
- 2004 Sink the Ship EP (M_nus)
- 2005 River Camping (M_nus)
- 2007 Fed on Youth (M_nus)
- 2009 Love Letters (M_nus)

Albums:

- 2003 False (Plus 8)
- 2007 2007 (M_nus)
