= 2007 (disambiguation) =

2007 was a common year starting on Monday of the Gregorian calendar.

2007 may also refer to:

- 2007 (number)
- 2007 (album), by False, 2007
- "2007", a song by JID from the album The Forever Story, 2022
