= Bunny (Matthew Dear album) =

Studio album by Matthew Dear
- Released: October 12, 2018
- Length: 61:54
- Label: Ghostly International
- Producer: Matthew Dear; Greg Ahee; James Ford

Matthew Dear chronology
Beams (2012)	Bunny (2018)	Backstroke (2020)

Professional ratings
Aggregate scores
Source	Rating
AnyDecentMusic?	6.9/10
Metacritic	76/100
Review scores
Source	Rating
AllMusic	3.5/5 stars
Clash	7/10
Exclaim!	6/10
The Guardian	3/5 stars
Loud and Quiet	5/10
MusicOMH	3.5/5 stars
Pitchfork	7.5/10
PopMatters	8/10
The Skinny	4/5 stars
Under the Radar	8/10

Bunny is the sixth studio album by American DJ and producer Matthew Dear. It was released on October 12, 2018 under Ghostly International. It is Dear's first album in six years following from Beams in 2012.

== Release ==
On July 3, 2017, the first single "Modafinil Blues". The track was written with Frank Ocean collaborator Troy Nōka.

The second single "Bad Ones" was released on August 29, 2017. The single features a collaboration with Canadian duo Tegan and Sara.

On August 8, 2018, Dear announced the release of the new album. He explained the reasoning for title: "I'm calling this one Bunny. As always, it’s got a little bit of everything that makes me who I am. Why Bunny? Fundamentally, I love the way the word looks and sounds. I love the way it rolls off the mind and onto the tongue". Alongside the album, single "Bunny's Dream" was also released.

The next single "Horses", which featured Tegan and Sara in the second collaboration, was released on September 18, 2018.

== Critical reception ==
Bunny was met with "generally favorable" reviews from critics. At Metacritic, which assigns a weighted average rating out of 100 to reviews from mainstream publications, this release received an average score of 76, based on 14 reviews. Aggregator Album of the Year gave the release a 70 out of 100 based on a critical consensus of 14 reviews.

Paul Simpson from AllMusic explained that the album is "as sprawling and ambitious as his other long-players", admiring that it "features some of [Dear's] most forthright songwriting and catchiest hooks". Simpson also noted the album "seems more like an album to mentally pick apart than dance to, yet it's not hard to lose one's self in the rush of Dear's inventive rhythms. Jill Guthrie from Clash said of the album: "in its entirety is quintessentially disparate, a fleeting repertoire of the avant, and a keeper of both the nostalgic and the progressive", explaining that the songs drift from "the ethereal" to the "gritty reality". Skye Butchard from Loud and Quiet explained that the album "goes just about everywhere in its hour-long runtime, from ’80s Bowie camp to shimmering alt-pop, to ’90s guitar rave. He’s been tinkering with club music and alt-rock his whole career, but this is by far his most bubbly outing. Despite that, his oddball baritone stays intact, which sadly makes for a mixed bag of experiments". Ben Devlin from MusicOMH said the album "is a worthwhile return for Matthew Dear, showcasing the production chops that have made him a familiar name for 15 years now. It sags in places, but this isn’t such a crime when the album also contains highlights like Electricity, Horses, Modafinil Blues and Bunny’s Dream, which are highly recommended for any electronic music fan.

=== Accolades ===
Accolades for Bunny
Publication	Accolade	Rank
MusicOMH	MusicOMH's Top 50 Albums of 2018	39

== Track listing ==
Bunny track listing
No.	Title	Writer(s)	Length
1.	"Bunny's Dream"	Greg Ahee; Matthew Dear	7:06
2.	"Calling"	Matthew Dear	3:27
3.	"Can You Rush Them"	Matthew Dear	4:22
4.	"Echo"	Matthew Dear	4:11
5.	"Modafinil Blues"	Antoine Collins; Matthew Dear	5:00
6.	"What You Don't Know"	Matthew Dear; James Ford; James Shaw	4:15
7.	"Horses" (featuring Tegan and Sara)	Matthew Dear; Sara Quin; Tegan Quin	5:08
8.	"Moving Man"	Matthew Dear	4:17
9.	"Bunny's Interlude"	Matthew Dear	1:23
10.	"Duke of Dens"	Matthew Dear	3:15
11.	"Electricity"	Matthew Dear	3:29
12.	"Kiss Me Forever"	Matthew Dear	5:08
13.	"Bad Ones" (featuring Tegan and Sara)	Matthew Dear; Sara Quin; Tegan Quin	4:32
14.	"Before I Go"	Matthew Dear	6:21
Total length:			61:54

== Personnel ==
Musicians

- Matthew Dear – primary artist, producer
- Antoine Collins – backing vocals
- Sara Quin – backing vocals
- Tegan Quin – backing vocals

Production

- Greg Ahee – producer
- James Ford – producer
- Joe Lambert – mastering
- Michael Cina – artwork
