= Peter Dijkstra =

Dutch conductor (born 1978)

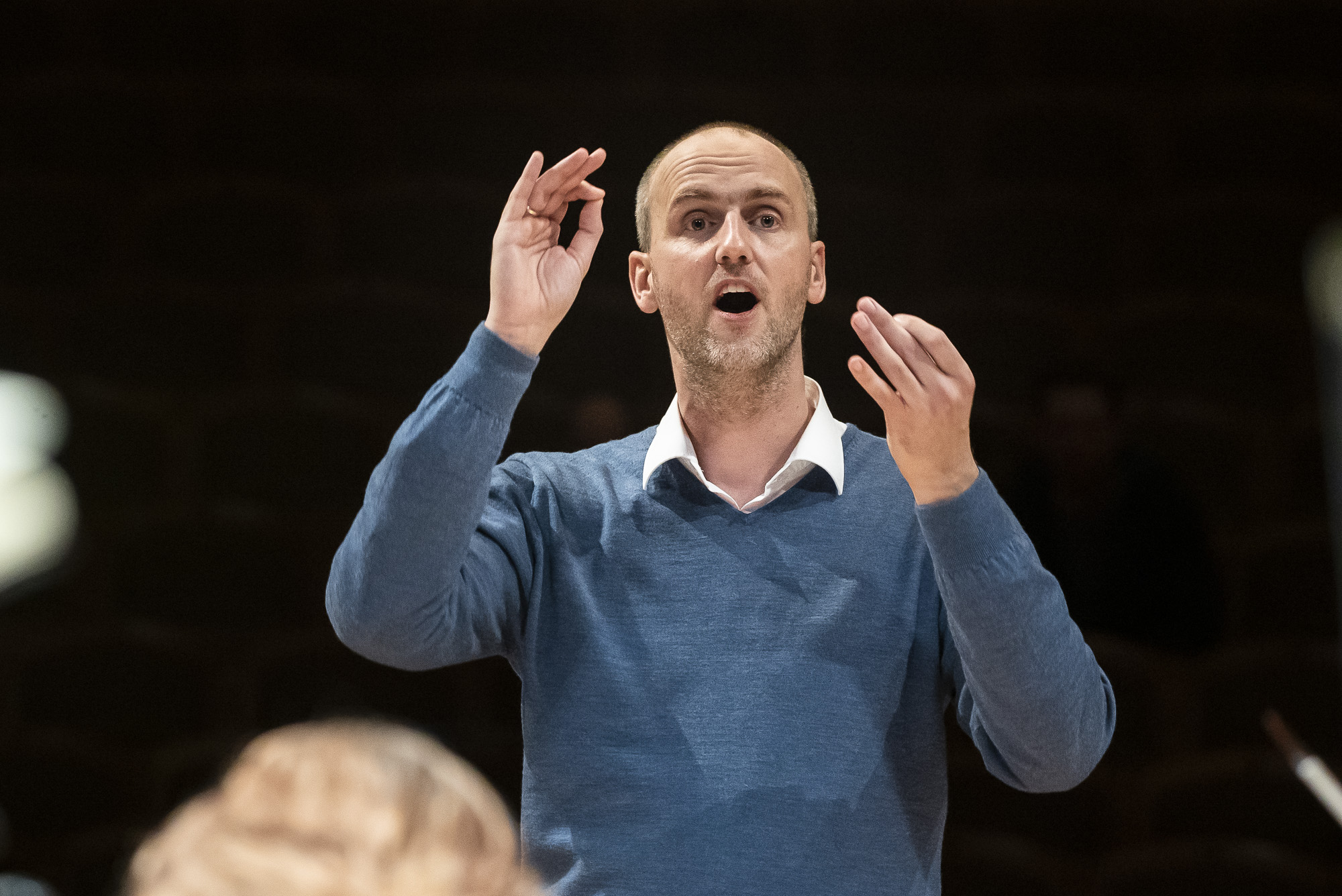
Peter Dijkstra by Petra Hajská

Peter Dijkstra (born 11 June 1978) is a Dutch conductor, especially of choirs and vocal ensembles.

Born in Roden, Drenthe, Dijkstra sang in his youth in Jongenskoor Roder, a boys' choir, which his father, Bouwe Dijkstra, founded in 1985. He sang the Cantatas of J. S. Bach with the likes of Gustav Leonhardt, Sigiswald Kuijken and Max van Egmond in Amsterdam. Later he studied singing and conducting at the Royal Conservatory of The Hague, at the Hochschule für Musik und Tanz Köln with Marcus Creed, and at the Royal College of Music in Stockholm with Jorma Panula. He also attended master classes with Eric Ericson and Tõnu Kaljuste. He led the ensemble The Gents.

Dijkstra has been guest conductor of the Netherlands Chamber Choir and artistic director of the Chor des Bayerischen Rundfunks of Munich from September 2005. In 2007 he was appointed chief conductor of the Swedish Radio Choir. He has collaborated with major European vocal ensembles and appeared as an orchestral conductor.

He is foreign member of the Royal Swedish Academy of Music.

== Awards ==
- Kersjes-van-de-Groenekan-Preis (2002)
- Eric Ericson Award (2003)
- Grammy Award with Chor des Bayerischen Rundfunks (2008)
- Eugen-Jochum-Preis (2014)
