= The emFire Collection: Mixed, Unmixed & Remixed =

Compilation album by Sasha
- Released: 14 April 2008
- Recorded: Various Places
- Genre: Nu skool breaks, progressive trance
- Length: 2:08:56
- Label: emFire
- Producer: Sasha

Sasha chronology
Avalon Los Angeles CA 24/06/06 (2006)	The emFire Collection: Mixed, Unmixed & Remixed (2008)	Invol2ver (2008)

Singles from The emFire Collection: Mixed, Unmixed & Remixed
- 1. "Coma" Released: 26 October 2007; 2. "Park It In the Shade" Released: 15 November 2007; 3. "Mongoose" Released: 12 December 2007; 4. "Who Killed Sparky" Released: 3 January 2008

Professional ratings
Review scores
Source	Rating
365mag	8/10 stars
Clash	9/10 stars
PopMatters	7/10 stars
Resident Advisor	3.5/5 stars

The emFire Collection: Mixed, Unmixed & Remixed is a collection of remixes of Sasha's tracks "Coma," "Park it in Shade," "Who Killed Sparky?" and "Mongoose." The second disc contains edits of these tracks, as well a continuous mix of Sasha's score from the surf film New Emissions of Light & Sound mixed into one song. This score won an award from the action sports film festival X Dance Awards. Four tracks from The emFire Collection were released on a two 12" vinyl records as The emFire Collection: Club Remixes.

== Track list ==
=== Disc 1 ===
1. "Coma (Slam Soma Coma mix)" – 5:36
2. "Park it in the Shade (Audion Deep Steeple mix)" – 12:20
3. "Who Killed Sparky? (Radio Slave's Brooklyn dub mix)" – 6:50
4. "Mongoose (The Field's Floating mix)" – 3:22
5. "Coma (Slam Paragraph mix)" – 7:53
6. "Park it in the Shade (Audion Ain't Got No Friends mix)" – 8:37
7. "Who Killed Sparky? (Radio Slave's Panorama garage mix)" – 12:13
8. "Mongoose (The Field's disco mix)" – 9:18

=== Disc 2 ===
1. "Coma (Spangled Rubdub)" – 5:42
2. "Park it in the Shade (Exclusive emFire edit)" – 5:32
3. "Who Killed Sparky? (Exclusive emFire edit)" – 5:37
4. "Mongoose (Exclusive emFire edit)" – 5:04
5. "New Emissions of Light & Sound (film score)" – 40:52
  1. "Gothic Mood" – 1:58
  2. "Sparky" – 2:19
  3. "Rooski" – 1:36
  4. "Lonely Place" – 3:43
  5. "Arthill" – 2:29
  6. "Coma" – 7:46
  7. "Celestial" – 2:30
  8. "Electromania" – 3:39
  9. "Marketplace" – 5:59
  10. "Stars" – 5:26
