= Achso =

EP by Ricardo Villalobos
- Released: December 12, 2005
- Genres: Minimal techno, microhouse
- Length: 49:50
- Label: Cadenza Records (CADENZA 08.10)
- Producer: Ricardo Villalobos

Ricardo Villalobos chronology
Thé au Harem d'Archimède (2004)	Achso (2005)	Salvador (2006)

Professional ratings
Review scores
Source	Rating
Allmusic	4/5 stars
Pitchfork Media	(8.9/10)

Achso is an EP by Ricardo Villalobos. It was released in December 2005 on double LP vinyl by Cadenza Records. The album title and song titles are a wordplay in stylised German, "achso" meaning "oh" and "ichso", "duso", "erso" & "sieso" meaning roughly "I was like", "you were like", "he was like" & "she was like".

== Track listing ==
CD pressing

All tracks are written by Ricardo Villalobos.

No.	Title	Length
1.	"Ichso"	13:44
2.	"Duso"	12:45
3.	"Erso"	11:31
4.	"Sieso"	12:05

Vinyl pressing

Side A
No.	Title	Length
1.	"Sieso"	12:05

Side B
No.	Title	Length
1.	"Erso"	11:31

Side C
No.	Title	Length
1.	"Duso"	12:45

Side D
No.	Title	Length
1.	"Ichso"	13:44
