= Salvador (Ricardo Villalobos album) =

Compilation album by Ricardo Villalobos
- Released: May 8, 2006
- Genre: Techno, tech house
- Length: 79:43
- Label: Frisbee Tracks FT CD 011
- Producer: Ricardo Villalobos

Ricardo Villalobos chronology
Achso (2005)	Salvador (2006)	Fizheuer Zieheuer (2006)

Salvador is a compilation album by Chilean producer Ricardo Villalobos, released in 2006. It collects several of his earlier singles, with a bonus remix of a Señor Coconut song.

"Lazer@Present" is the B side of the original Que Belle Epoque single, released in 2000; "Que Belle Epoque 2006" was released as its own single in 2006. "Suesse Cheques" and "Tempura" are the A and B sides of the Pino Jet Explosion single, released in 1999. "Lugom-ix" and "Logohitz" are the A and B sides of the Salvador single, released in 1998. "Unflug" was released as its own single in 2006, while Villalobos' remix of "Electrolatino" was released on the Señor Coconut single of the same name in 2002.

== Track listing ==
CD pressing

All tracks are written by Ricardo Villalobos, unless noted

No.	Title	Length
1.	"Que Belle Epoque 2006"	12:57
2.	"Tempura"	10:29
3.	"Suesse Cheques"	7:17
4.	"Unflug"	6:51
5.	"Lazer@Present"	7:31
6.	"Logohitz"	7:51
7.	"Lugom-ix"	11:18
8.	"Electrolatino (Ricardo Villalobos' 'Lektro Carino mix)" (Uwe Schmidt)	15:30
