= Enfants =

- French word

Single by Ricardo Villalobos
- A-side: "Enfants (Chants)"
- B-side: "Enfants (Tambours)"
- Released: February 22, 2008
- Genre: Minimal techno, microhouse
- Length: 17:05
- Label: Sei Es Drum, Word and Sound
- Producer(s): Ricardo Villalobos

Ricardo Villalobos singles chronology
"'Sei Es Drum'" (2007)	"Enfants" (2008)	"'Vasco'" (2008)

"Enfants" is a 2008 single by electronic music producer Ricardo Villalobos. Though 17 minutes in length, the A-side, "Enfants (Chants)", has been described as a "remarkably catchy, hype-inducing DJ tool" by Pitchfork Media, and as a "great tool for DJs" by electronic music magazine Resident Advisor, due to its minimal changes over the course of the entire song.

== Structure ==
The branding of "Enfants (Chants)" as a "DJ tool" is due to its unusual structure, incorporating "no development over its seventeen minute length". The song is based on a repeating sample of "Baba Yaga La Sorcière", a track from Christian Vander's 1995 rework of his band Magma's Mekanïk Destruktïw Kommandöh (1973). With the addition electronic drums and hi-hat, it "turns snippet of a prog rock classic into a minimal techno classic." The sample simply fades in at the beginning, and fades out at the piece's conclusion. The minimal development through the song invites seamless DJ mixing; Villalobos himself stated that "the idea is that anyone can mix whatever track into this track because it doesn't have too much melody, tones or harmony inside."

The B-side, "Enfants (Tambours)", is a ten-minute "DJ tool" in a similar style, consisting of only percussion and bass.

== Reception ==
"Enfants (Chants)" was released to much hype, and received generally positive reviews. It was given a 5 star rating by DJ Magazine and was rated 3.5/5 in a review by Resident Advisor. It was also featured in a number of "best of 2008" lists, including being named the 52nd best track of 2008 by Pitchfork Media and a "Critical Beat" of 2008 in The Wire's "2008 Rewind" issue. "Enfants (Chants)" was also featured on The Wire's April 2008 "Office Ambience" chart, with reviews editor Derek Walmsley referring to the song as a "minimal techno masterpiece".

== Track listing ==
Side A
No.	Title	Length
1.	"Enfants (Chants)"	17:08

Side B
No.	Title	Length
1.	"Enfants (Tambours)"	10:08
