= Kanon Pokajanen =

1997 musical composition by Arvo Pärt

- by Arvo Pärt
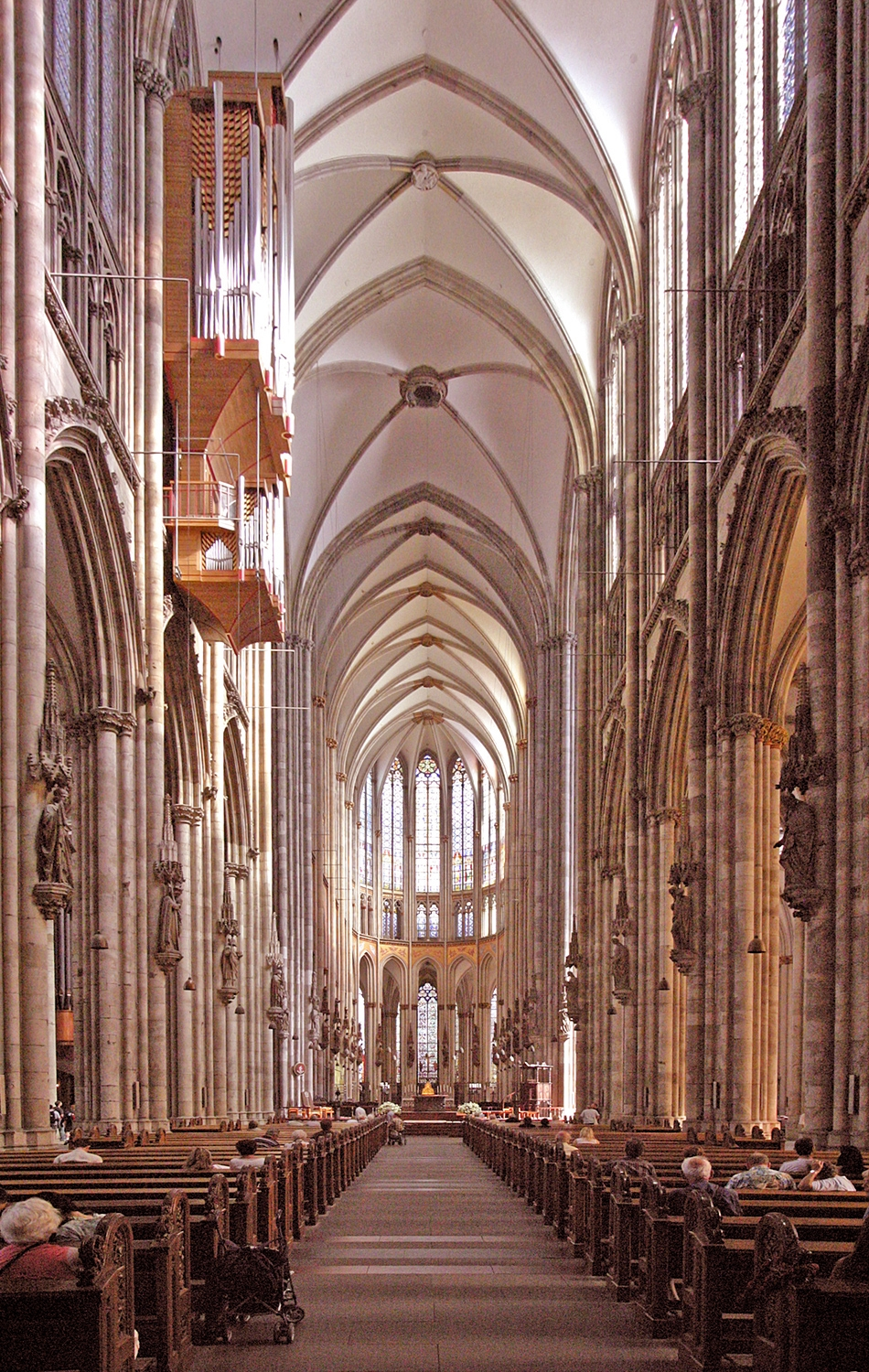
- Interior of the Cologne Cathedral, for which the piece was composed
- Genre: Sacred choral
- Style: Contemporary music
- Occasion: 750th anniversary of the Cologne Cathedral
- Text: "Canon of Repentance to Our Lord Jesus Christ"
- Language: Church Slavonic
- Composed: 1997
- Dedication: Tõnu Kaljuste and the Estonian Philharmonic Chamber Choir
- Scoring: SATB choir

Premiere
- Date: 17 March 1998
- Location: Cologne Cathedral

Kanon Pokajanen is a 1997 composition by Arvo Pärt for four-part (SATB) choir. The text is the "Canon of Repentance to Our Lord Jesus Christ", an Orthodox hymn. The text is sung in Church Slavonic and following the tradition of Russian sacred choral music, it is sung a cappella.

== Background ==
Arvo Pärt describes his encounter with the text and the history of setting this text to music thus:

Many years ago, when I first became involved in the tradition of the Russian Orthodox Church, I came across a text that made a profound impression on me although I cannot have understood it at the time. It was the Canon of Repentance.

Since then I have often returned these verses, slowly and arduously seeking to unfold their meaning. Two choral compositions (Nun eile ich...., 1990 and Memento, 1994) were the first attempts to approach the canon. I then decided to set it to music in its entirety-from beginning to end. This allowed me to stay with it, to devote myself to it; and, at the very least, its hold on me did not abate until I had finished the score. I had a similar experience while working on Passio.

It took over two years to compose the Kanon pokajanen, and the time "we spent together" was extremely enriching. That may explain why this music means so much to me.

He was commissioned by KölnMusic GmbH to write a work commemorating the 750th anniversary of the building of Cologne Cathedral. He finished it in 1997 and it premiered at Cologne Cathedral on March 17, 1998, performed by the Estonian Philharmonic Chamber Choir under the direction of Tõnu Kaljuste, to whom (both choir and conductor) this piece was dedicated.

== Structure ==
As Pärt said, "the words are very important to me, they define the music" and furthermore "the construction of the music is based on the construction of the text." So the structure of the music is going to be based on its text, namely the "Canon of Repentance."

The Eastern Orthodox canon, in general, is composed of nine odes (though in practice usually only eight are chanted). Each ode begins with an introductory verse called the eirmos (pl. eirmoi) which is followed by four verses called troparia (sing. troparion) all interspersed with antiphonal responses suited for the canon's subject. The last troparion is referred to as the Theotokion, so-called because it is written in honor of the Theotokos (Mother of God).

There are also intermezzo hymns which serve to encapsulate the canon's theme: the Sedalen (appears in between Ode III and Ode IV), the Kontakion and its Ikos (both in between Ode VI and Ode VII), and the Prayer after the Canon (after Ode IX). The latter concludes the canon and can serve as pre-Communion prayer.

The eirmos (Greek for "model" or "chain") is a paraphrase of one of the nine canticles found in Scripture, usually taking a specific verse or the general idea in the Biblical song. Here are the list of the Biblical canticles with their traditional names:

1. Exodus 15:1–19—The Canticle of Moses and Miriam, after crossing the Red Sea
2. Deuteronomy 32:1–43—The Canticle of Moses, chastising the Israelites for their sins
3. 1 Samuel 2:1–10 (1 Kingdoms 2:1–10, LXX)—The Canticle of Hannah
4. Book of Habakkuk 3:2–19—The Canticle (or Vision) of Habakkuk
5. Book of Isaiah 26:9–20—The Prayer of Isaiah
6. Book of Jonah 2:3–10—The Prayer of Jonah
7. Prayer of Azariah 2–21 (Daniel 3:26–45, Septuagint)—The Prayer of the Three Holy Children: Hananiah, Mishael and Azariah
8. The Song of the Three Holy Children 28–67 (Daniel 3:52–90, Septuagint)—The Song of the Three Holy Children
9. Gospel of Luke 1:46–55—The Magnificat

Normally the second ode is omitted owing to its severe nature. The most notable exception to this is in the Great Penitential Canon of St. Andrew of Crete which is chanted during Great Lent. In most canons, including the present one, there is no text written for Ode II and therefore there is not an Ode II in Kanon Pokajanen. The numbering, however, does not change as shown in the outline below for the entire piece:

- Ode I
- Ode III
- Ode IV
- Ode V
- Ode VI
- Kondakion
- Ikos
- Ode VII
- Ode VIII
- Ode IX
- Prayer after the Canon

== Musical Characteristics ==
Kanon Pokajanen exhibits characteristics of Pärt's tinntinabular style. The piece remains almost exclusively in D minor, deviating only in particularly expressive passages and sometimes final cadences (e.g. the piece ends with a Picardy third on D).

- The eirmoi is rendered in a full choral sound. In between the phrases, there are often pauses of silence before the choir resumes (this device is used throughout the piece). Most of the time, the soprano and the tenor sing the melody and the alto and bass sing the harmony.
- The troparia has a recitative-like sound with only a few parts singing at any one time. There is a general voice disposition that is maintained throughout the odes: the first and third have the bass singing the melody and the tenor singing the harmony; the second has the soprano and alto sing the melody and the tenor sing the harmony; the last one has the alto and tenor sing the melody and the soprano sing the harmony. Both the eirmoi and the troparia follow the characteristic of Russian chant singing where the former is sung and the latter is sung recitatively.
- The two antiphonal responses are Pomiluy mya, Bozhe, pomiluy mya ("Have mercy on me, O God, have mercy on me") and the Lesser Doxology (Slava Ottsu i Sïnu i Svyatomu Duhu / "Glory to the Father and to the Son and to the Holy Spirit"; I nïnye i prisno i vo vyeki vyekov. Amin / "Now and ever and unto the ages of ages. Amen."). The former one uses a hocket effect between a set of voices. The latter is sung in rhythmic unison.
- The intermezzo verses have a distinct musical character that is closer to Byzantine style chant than the more Russian-influenced odes.
- The Sedalen employs a unison melody, also closer to the Byzantine style, sung by all four voices. It includes a drone on a D that traverses the entire D scale, gradually intensifying in volume and register. The Lesser Doxology is sung in a matter similar to the Pomiluy mya, Bozhe, pomiluy mya response. The Theotokion at the end of the Sedalen is sung in the usual matter except with solo voices.
- The Kontakion is also Byzantine-like in its melody. The soprano and the alto sing it together while the tenor and bass provide the ison. The key here is A melodic minor.
- The Ikos is much like the Kontakion except the tenor and bass sing both the melody and the ison (divided of course).
- The Prayer after the Canon is unique in its setting and there is a building intensity in terms of the strength and volume of the voices before receding again to a lighter and more ethereal sound.

Overall, the melodies and harmonies remain fairly static throughout the piece. Variation is created through alteration of the dispositions and roles of the various voice parts. The odes build toward each intermezzo section, treating it as a small climax. The Prayer after the Canon is the most intense of all the climaxes, paralleling the prayer's function.

== Endnotes ==
1. – Arvo Pärt, "Kanon pokajanen", trans. Catherine Schelbert in accompanying booklet, Kanon Pokajanen performed by the Estonian Philharmonic Chamber Choir, conducted by Tõnu Kaljuste. ECM New Series 1654/55, 1998. Compact disc.
2. – Ibid., "Starting from Scratch", interviewed by Nick Kimberly, Gramophone 74 (September 1996), 16.
3. – Johann von Gardner, Russian Church Singing, Volume 1 (Orthodox Worship and Hymnography), trans. Vladimir Morosan (Crestwood, NY: St. Vladimir's Seminary Press, 1980), 44. ISBN 0-913836-56-7
