= Suckfish =

Studio album by Audion
- Released: October 4, 2005
- Genre: Detroit techno Minimal techno
- Length: 71:37
- Label: Ghostly International

Audion chronology
Just Fucking (2005)	Suckfish (2005)	Just A Man/Woman (2006)

Professional ratings
Review scores
Source	Rating
Almost Cool	(7.5/10)
Stylus Magazine	(B+)
Pitchfork Media	(8.0/10)
PopMatters	(8/10)
Tiny Mix Tapes	3.5/5 stars

Suckfish is the debut LP by Audion, a musical project of Matthew Dear. It was generally well received by critics, garnering a score of 80/100 on Metacritic.

== Track listing ==
1. "Vegetables" – 5:54
2. "Your Place or Mine" – 6:29
3. "Titty Fuck" – 7:11
4. "T.B." – 7:55
5. "Kisses" – 5:27
6. "Wield" – 8:15
7. "Taut" – 8:19
8. "Rubber" – 3:38
9. "Uvular" – 7:18
10. "The Pong" – 5:26
11. "Just Fucking" – 5:40
