= Black City (Matthew Dear album) =

Studio album by Matthew Dear
- Released: August 17, 2010
- Genre: Electronic
- Length: 47:47
- Label: Ghostly International
- Producer: Matthew Dear

Matthew Dear chronology
Asa Breed (2007)	Black City (2010)	Beams (2012)

Black City is the fourth studio album by Matthew Dear. It was released via Ghostly International in 2010. It peaked at number 17 on the Billboard Top Dance/Electronic Albums chart, as well as number 29 on the Heatseekers Albums chart.

== Critical reception ==
Professional ratings
Aggregate scores
Source	Rating
Metacritic	78/100
Review scores
Source	Rating
AllMusic	4/5 stars
The A.V. Club	C
Clash	9/10
Drowned in Sound	7/10
The Guardian	2/5 stars
Paste	8.3/10
Pitchfork	8.4/10
PopMatters	8/10 stars
Resident Advisor	4.0/5
Tiny Mix Tapes	3.5/5 marks

At Metacritic, which assigns a weighted average score out of 100 to reviews from mainstream critics, Black City received an average score of 78, based on 23 reviews, indicating "generally favorable reviews".

Pitchfork placed it at number 46 on its list of "The Top 50 Albums of 2010".

== Track listing ==
All tracks are written by Matthew Dear.

No.	Title	Length
1.	"Honey"	3:47
2.	"I Can't Feel"	4:18
3.	"Little People (Black City)"	9:20
4.	"Slowdance"	4:22
5.	"Soil to Seed"	2:28
6.	"You Put a Smell on Me"	5:04
7.	"Shortwave"	5:12
8.	"Monkey"	3:39
9.	"More Surgery"	5:30
10.	"Gem"	4:07
Total length:		47:47

== Personnel ==
Credits adapted from liner notes.

- Matthew Dear – production
- Paul Gold – mastering
- Will Calcutt – artwork, photography

== Charts ==
Chart (2010)	Peak position
US Top Dance/Electronic Albums (Billboard)	17
US Heatseekers Albums (Billboard)	29
