= Thé Au Harem D'Archimède =

Thé au Harem d'Archimède

Studio album by Ricardo Villalobos
- Released: October 12, 2004
- Genre: Techno
- Length: 75:02 (CD); 86:14 (LP)
- Label: Perlon; PERLON 43; PERLON 43CD
- Producer: Ricardo Villalobos

Ricardo Villalobos chronology
Alcachofa (2003)	Thé au Harem d'Archimède (2004)	Achso (2005)

Thé au Harem d'Archimède is the second studio album by Ricardo Villalobos. It was released by Perlon on LP and CD on October 12, 2004. The album's French title, which translates into English as "Tea in the Harem of Archimedes," is a reference to the Mehdi Charef film Tea in the Harem (French title: Le thé au Harem d'Archimède), as well as a mondegreen of the French phrase "Théorème d'Archimède," also the title of the album's fourth track.

Thé au Harem d'Archimède continues to build on the nuanced percussion of Villalobos' previous album, Alcachofa, while eschewing melodies in favour for rhythm and groove. On vinyl, "Hireklon" is extended by over five minutes and features a longer guitar solo, while the delay and dub effects on the clapping is toned down significantly. An additional song, "Stereobox," is also present.

== Reception ==
Professional ratings
Review scores
Source	Rating
Allmusic	link
Dusted Magazine	Positive link
Pitchfork Media	(8.2/10) link
Stylus Magazine	C link

Reception was mixed to positive. Andy Kellman, writing for Allmusic, says that Villalobos is "perfectly content with forming luscious, pensively roiling, ten-minute grooves that double as some of the most organic-sounding electronic productions imaginable". A review for Dusted Magazine, by Jon Dale, lauded the album's unusual synthesis of sounds and influences, while noting that it was not as accessible as Villalobos' debut, Alcachofa. Ron Schepper's review for Stylus Magazine had a similarly mixed feel, noting the album's less accessible nature when compared to Alcachofa and stating that "Villalobos dives ever more deeply into percussive gumbo and leaves accessible hooks behind".

Resident Advisor ranked Thé Au Harem D'Archimède 77th on its list of the Top 100 Albums of the '00s.

== Track listing ==
CD pressing

All tracks are written by Ricardo Villalobos.

No.	Title	Length
1.	"Hireklon"	9:01
2.	"Serpentin"	9:46
3.	"Forallseasons"	4:27
4.	"Théorème d'Archimède" ("Theorem of Archimedes")	6:50
5.	"Hello Halo"	8:12
6.	"Temenarc 2"	6:01
7.	"Temenarc 1"	7:27
8.	"Miami"	9:00
9.	"True to Myself"	14:18

Vinyl pressing

Side A
No.	Title	Length
1.	"Hireklon"	14:47

Side B
No.	Title	Length
1.	"Serpentin"	9:47
2.	"Forallseasons"	4:29

Side C
No.	Title	Length
1.	"Théorème d'Archimède" ("Theorem of Archimedes")	6:52
2.	"Hello Halo"	8:13

Side D
No.	Title	Length
1.	"Temenarc 2"	6:01
2.	"Temenarc 1"	7:28

Side E
No.	Title	Length
1.	"Stereobox"	5:25
2.	"Miami"	9:00

Side F
No.	Title	Length
1.	"True to Myself"	14:19

== Credits ==
- Ricardo Villalobos - writer, producer, main performer
- Cassy Britton - vocals on "Miami" and "True To Myself"
- Rashad Becker - mastering
