= Sei Es Drum =

- The label for the first side of Sei Es Drum

EP by Ricardo Villalobos
- Released: November 2007
- Genre: Minimal techno, microhouse
- Length: 73:31
- Label: Sei Es Drum (SED000)
- Producer: Ricardo Villalobos

Ricardo Villalobos chronology
Fabric 36 (2007)	Sei Es Drum (2007)	Enfants (2008)

Sei Es Drum is an extended play by Ricardo Villalobos. It was released in November 2007 on triple vinyl by Sei Es Drum, Ricardo Villalobos' own microhouse and minimal techno imprint. It was the label's first release. Despite its length, Sei Es Drum was marketed as an EP, and featured the full versions of several compositions featured on Villalobos' guest mix, Fabric 36. Like all of the releases on the Sei Es Drum label, Sei Es Drum was only released on vinyl.

== Track listing ==
Side A
No.	Title	Length
1.	"Andruic"	13:15

Side B
No.	Title	Length
1.	"Fizpatrick" (with Patrick Ense)	11:55

Side C
No.	Title	Length
1.	"Primer encuentro Latino-Americano"	12:36

Side D
No.	Title	Length
1.	"Druic"	10:12

Side E
No.	Title	Length
1.	"Samasai"	11:16

Side F
No.	Title	Length
1.	"Baila sin petit"	5:27
2.	"Farenzer House"	8:52
