= Fizheuer Zieheuer =

EP by Ricardo Villalobos
- Released: November 6, 2006
- Genre: Minimal techno
- Length: 72:39
- Label: Playhouse PLAYCD021, PLAY133
- Producer: Ricardo Villalobos

Ricardo Villalobos chronology
| Salvador (2006) | Fizheuer Zieheuer (2006) | Fabric 36 (2007) |

Professional ratings
Review scores
| Source | Rating |
|---|---|
| Allmusic | 3.5/5 stars |
| Pitchfork Media | (8.2/10) |

Fizheuer Zieheuer is a 2006 single written and produced by minimal techno artist Ricardo Villalobos.

The 37-minute song is primarily based on a horns sample from a gypsy folk song titled "Pobjednički Čoček" by Serbian group Blehorkestar Bakija Bakić, as discovered – after the record's publication – by a member of the forum at Discogs.com. The sample is in a major key and repeats ostinato-like through almost the entire track, occasionally complemented by a second horns sample from the introductory trumpet solo of "Pobjednički Čoček", itself appearing three times in total. The rest of the song consists of nuanced percussion put through multiple permutations of filters and delays. "Fizbeast", only present on the CD release, consists of the near entirety of "Fizheuer", but without the samples from "Pobjednički Čoček".

According to Allmusic, "with all of its hypnotism and gradual build up, [Fizheuer Zieheuer was] in the box of every major DJ for a good portion of 2006 and with good reason, as crowds worldwide seem to relish in it". In his book Energy Flash, music critic Simon Reynolds cited Fizheuer Zieheuer as evidence for Villalobos having been one of "a handful of artists [who were still] pushing [dance] music into unknown spaces" during an "era of consolidation" where the genre lacked innovation otherwise. "Fizheuer Zieheuer" indeed was a highlight of Villalobos' own multi-hour DJ sets, where it would be teased out and played, nearly in full, while layered with a multitude of other tracks being spun that night. The Guardian noted the track's influence from Manuel Göttsching's 1984 album E2-E4 and labeled Villalobos a "musical descendant" of Göttsching.

== Track listing ==
CD pressing

All tracks are written by Ricardo Villalobos

| No. | Title | Length |
|---|---|---|
| 1. | "Fizheuer Zieheuer" | 37:09 |
| 2. | "Fizbeast" | 35:30 |

Vinyl pressing

Side A
| No. | Title | Length |
|---|---|---|
| 1. | "Fizheuer Zieheuer pt. 1" | 15:00 |

Side B
| No. | Title | Length |
|---|---|---|
| 1. | "Fizheuer Zieheuer pt. 2" | 22:09 |
