= Fundacion NYC =

Compilation album by Sasha

Compilation album (mixtape) by Sasha
- Released: 13 June 2005
- Recorded: 2004
- Genre: Progressive house, breaks, electronica
- Length: 77:20
- Label: Global Underground Ltd.

Sasha chronology
Involver (2004)	Fundacion NYC (2005)	Avalon Los Angeles CA 24/06/06 (2006)

Professional ratings
Review scores
Source	Rating
365mag	8.5/10 stars
JIVE Magazine	3/5 stars
Resident Advisor	4/5 stars

Fundacion NYC is a mix album by Welsh DJ Sasha. The album is recorded using the Ableton Live software and the album bears the name of his monthly residency nights in New York and Los Angeles.

== Track listing ==
1. Badger - "Rise of the Machine" – 2:59
2. Adam Johnson - "Four Squares" – 5:25
3. Swayzak - "Another Way" (Richard Davies Mix) – 6:36
4. Beanfield - "Tides" featuring Bajka (C's Movement #1) (Carl Craig Remix) – 6:36
5. Kosmas Epsilon - "Innocent Thoughts" (Stel Remix) – 2:17
6. Funk Da Void - "All That Matters" – 1:06
7. Closer Musik - "One, Two, Three" (Ewan Pearson Remix) – 1:18
8. Phonique - "99 & a Half" featuring Alexander East (I:Cube Remix) – 3:25
9. Holden & Thompson - "Come to Me" (Last Version) – 3:58
10. Holden & Thompson - "Come to Me" (Club Mix) – 7:06
11. M.A.N.D.Y. - "Jah" – 2:17
12. Playgroup - "Behind the Wheel" (DJ-Kicks Electroca$h Mix) – 4:41
13. Freeform Five - "Electromagnetic" (Tiefschwarz Dub) – 4:49
14. Andre Kraml - "Safari" (James Holden Remix) – 6:35
15. Freaky Chakra - "Blacklight Fantasy" – 5:27
16. Goldfrapp - "Strict Machine" (We Are Glitter Mix) – 5:08
17. M83 - "Don't Save Us From the Flames" (Superpitcher Remix) – 6:07

== Charts ==
Chart (2005)	Peak position
UK Dance Albums (Official Charts Company)	3
US Dance/Electronic Albums (Billboard)	4
US Heatseekers Albums (Billboard)	28
US Independent Albums (Billboard)	37
