= Tom Trago =

Dutch electronic musician and DJ

- Born: Tom Trago; 28 January 1983 (age 43); Amsterdam
- Genres: House; techno; electronic
- Occupations: DJ; producer
- Years active: 2006–present
- Label: Rush Hour Recordings
- Website: tomtrago.com

Tom Trago (born 28 January 1983), is a Dutch electronic musician and DJ.

== Early life ==
Tom Trago was born in Amsterdam on 28 January 1983. He grew up in an artistic household. During his teens, he entertained himself by listening to albums from his parents’ record collection and making his own radio shows. At the age of 15, he decided he would dedicate his life to music. On his 18th birthday, he received the gift of a piano from his mother.

== Career ==
At the age of 15, Tom began to DJ at coffee shops in Amsterdam. Early in his career, he was offered encouragement and support from older Dutch DJs and producers including Aardvarck and Awanto 3. Through the city's music scene, Trago met the members of production collective Rednose Distrikt. According to a 2011 interview with Juno Plus, it was their use of the Akai MPC2000 workstation that inspired Tom to make music.

Trago was first drawn to hip-hop, soul and jazz, but later discovered house and techno through a combination of the 1990s Amsterdam club scene and regular trips to the Rush Hour record shop. He was aware that Rednose Distrikt had been signed to the store's record label, also called Rush Hour, so submitted a demo CD. This was signed and Rush Hour released his first single, Live With The BBQ, in 2006.

In 2009, he released his debut album Voyage Direct. A year later, Trago established a record label of the same name, in order to showcase music by Dutch electronic musicians. As of 2018, the label has released music from Dexter, Legowelt, Awanto3, Maxi Mill, Overlast, Interstellar Funk, San Proper, Magnesii, Elias Mazian, Boris Werner, Simon Weiss, Darling, Efde, Tracey, Sterac Electronics and Trago himself. In 2015, the label established a DJ agency, Voyage Select, in order to manage the interests of Dutch DJs and producers.

In 2011, Trago released his second album Iris. The album drew on a wider palette of influences, including hip-hop, soul and R&B. In a review for the Irish Times, journalist Jim Carroll described Trago as “a producer for the future”, adding that it was “far broader in scope than its predecessor", a view echoed by other reviews published around the album's release.

In 2013, he released his third album The Light Fantastic. During the recording process, Trago spent a month living in a cabin in the countryside. Resident Advisor reviewed the album favourably, saying that it “wears its influences proudly, but fashions them into undeniably Dutch forms.” Reviewer Tom Barham also suggested that Trago was a leading figure in the Netherlands rising house scene.

Trago is known for his willingness to collaborate with other DJs and producers. To date, he has produced records alongside San Proper, Romathony, Steffi, Breach, William Kouam Djoko, Tyree Cooper, Young Marco, Awanto 3, Bok Bok and Seth Troxler. In 2015, Trago undertook a DJ tour in which he played sets with other high-profile DJs including Ben UFO, Tama Sumo, Jus Ed, Jackmaster and Young Marco.

In 2017, Trago contributed a track to Dekmantel's 10th anniversary series of 12” singles. The following year, he released his fourth album, Bergen, on the same label. The album's title refers to the Northern Dutch town where he recorded it. Trago said he was inspired by his natural surroundings and that he thought it was his “most accomplished and honest” album to date.

== Discography ==
Discography adapted from Discogs & Rate Your Music

=== Albums ===
- Voyage Direct (2009)
- Iris (2011)
- The Light Fantastic (2013)
- Bergen (2018)

=== EPs ===
- Proper's A'dam Family Series Part 2 (w/ San Proper) (2007)
- Compressed Roots (w/ Yuro) (2007)
- The Fluor Green EP (2007)
- Primary Roots (w/ Yuro) (2008)
- Passion (Single) (2008)
- Voyage Direct Remixes (2009)
- Voyage Direct - Live Takes (2010)
- Voyage Direct - Out Takes (2010)
- Voyage Direct Remixes Part 2 - Amsterdam Revisited (2010)
- Voyage Direct - FS Green Remixes (2010)
- Physical Thrill (w/ Young Marco & Awanto 3) (2011)
- Night Voyage Tool Kit (w/ Bok Bok)
- Iris In Dub (2011)
- Iris Album Sampler (2011)
- Shutters (2011)
- Iris (Remixes) (2012)
- Tracks From The Vault Vol. 2 (w/ Terrence Dixon) (2012)
- The Light Fantastic Album Sampler (2013)
- Give Me What You Want (w/ Bok Bok) (2013)
- Hidden Heart Of Gold (2014)
- Need This (w/ Bok Bok) (2014)
- Pussy Trak (w/ Bok Bok) (2014)
- Serene Waters (2017)

=== Singles ===
- "Live with the BBQ/The Handclapping Song" (2006)
- "Use Me Again (And Again)" (2010)
- "Rise Up" (2012)
- "Two Together" (2013)
- "De Natte Cel" (with Seth Troxler) (2015)
- "Brutal Romance" (2016)
