= Backstroke (album) =

Studio album by Matthew Dear
- Released: July 13, 2004
- Genre: Microhouse
- Length: 42:43
- Label: Spectral Sound

Matthew Dear chronology
Leave Luck to Heaven (2003)	Backstroke (2004)	Asa Breed (2007)

Backstroke is the second studio album by Matthew Dear. It was released on Spectral Sound, a sub-label of Ghostly International, in 2004.

== Critical reception ==
Professional ratings
Review scores
Source	Rating
AllMusic	3.5/5 stars
Blender	4/5 stars
Pitchfork	6.8/10
Prefix	7.0/10

Andy Kellman of AllMusic gave the album 3.5 stars out of 5, saying, "Whatever its designation, Backstroke is a marked turn away from Leave Luck to Heaven, if scarcely a stylistic changeup." He added, "Several cuts will indeed serve adequately in the clubs, but the album as a whole is tailored for a more personal setting."

== Track listing ==
No.	Title	Length
1.	"Another"	5:00
2.	"Tide"	4:55
3.	"Takes on You"	6:44
4.	"Grut Wall"	3:53
5.	"I Know Howser"	4:00
6.	"Huggy's Parade"	5:55
7.	"Good Girl"	3:39
8.	"And in the Night"	8:32
Total length:		42:43
