= Alpstein (album) =

Studio album by Paul Giger
- Released: 1991
- Recorded: 1990–1991
- Studios: Rainbow Studio; Oslo, Norway
- Genre: Jazz
- Length: 62:15
- Labels: ECM; ECM 1426
- Producer: Manfred Eicher

Paul Giger chronology
Chartres (1989)	Alpstein (1991)	Schattenwelt (1993)

Alpstein is the second album by Swiss violinist and composer Paul Giger, recorded in 1990 and 1991 and released on ECM later in 1991.

== Reception ==
The AllMusic review by Mark W. B. Allender awarded the album 4 stars stating "Violin virtuoso Paul Giger revisits his roots with this, his second solo recording, Alpstein, which features pieces for violin, saxophone, and percussion based on the folk traditions of the Alpstein region of Switzerland... This recording features the saxophone work of Jan Garbarek and the percussion of Pierre Favre. Both add an incredible warmth to the recording on the pieces they are featured on."

Professional ratings
Review scores
Source	Rating
AllMusic	4/5 stars

== Track listing ==
All compositions by Paul Giger

1. "Zäuerli" – 3:07
2. "Karma Shadub" – 13:39
3. "Alpsegen" – 12:38
4. "Zäuerli" – 1:51
5. "Zäuerli" – 2:18
6. "Chuereihe" – 17:33
7. "Chlauseschuppel" – 4:09
8. "Trogener Chilbiläbe"* – 7:00

=== Note ===
  - Recorded at Trogen, Switzerland in 1990

== Personnel ==
- Paul Giger – violin
- Jan Garbarek – tenor saxophone
- Pierre Favre – percussion

=== Technical personnel ===
- Manfred Eicher – producer
- Jan Erik Kongshaug – engineer
- Andrew Ward – cover design
- Dieter Rehm – layout
- Liner Notes – Martin Schaub – liner notes
- Peter Maurer – liner photo
- Christof Pflüger, Josef Fritsche, Martin Schaub, Mäddel Fuchs – booklet photo
