= Schattenwelt =

Studio album by Paul Giger
- Released: 1993
- Recorded: May 1992
- Studio: Propstei Sankt Gerold; Sankt Gerold, Austria
- Genre: Jazz
- Length: 54:08
- Label: ECM New Series; ECM 1487
- Producer: Manfred Eicher

Paul Giger chronology
Alpstein (1991)	Schattenwelt (1993)	Ignis (1994)

Schattenwelt is the third album by Swiss violinist and composer Paul Giger, recorded in May 1992 and released on ECM the following year.

== Reception ==
The AllMusic review by Mark W. B. Allender awarded the album 4 stars calling it "a great recording for aficionados of the violin with a sophisticated ear".

Professional ratings
Review scores
Source	Rating
AllMusic	4/5 stars

== Track listing ==
All compositions by Paul Giger

1. "Bay" - 3:15
2. "Dancing with the Stars" - 5:46
3. "Crane" - 2:34
4. "Creating the Labyrinth" - 10:54
5. "Birth of the Bull" - 1:54
6. "Fourteen Virgins" - 5:43
7. "Death" - 1:37
8. "Dancing in the World of Shadows" - 6:24
9. "Bombay (Good Night)" - 16:01

== Personnel ==
- Paul Giger – violin
