= Estonian Philharmonic Chamber Choir =

Estonian choir

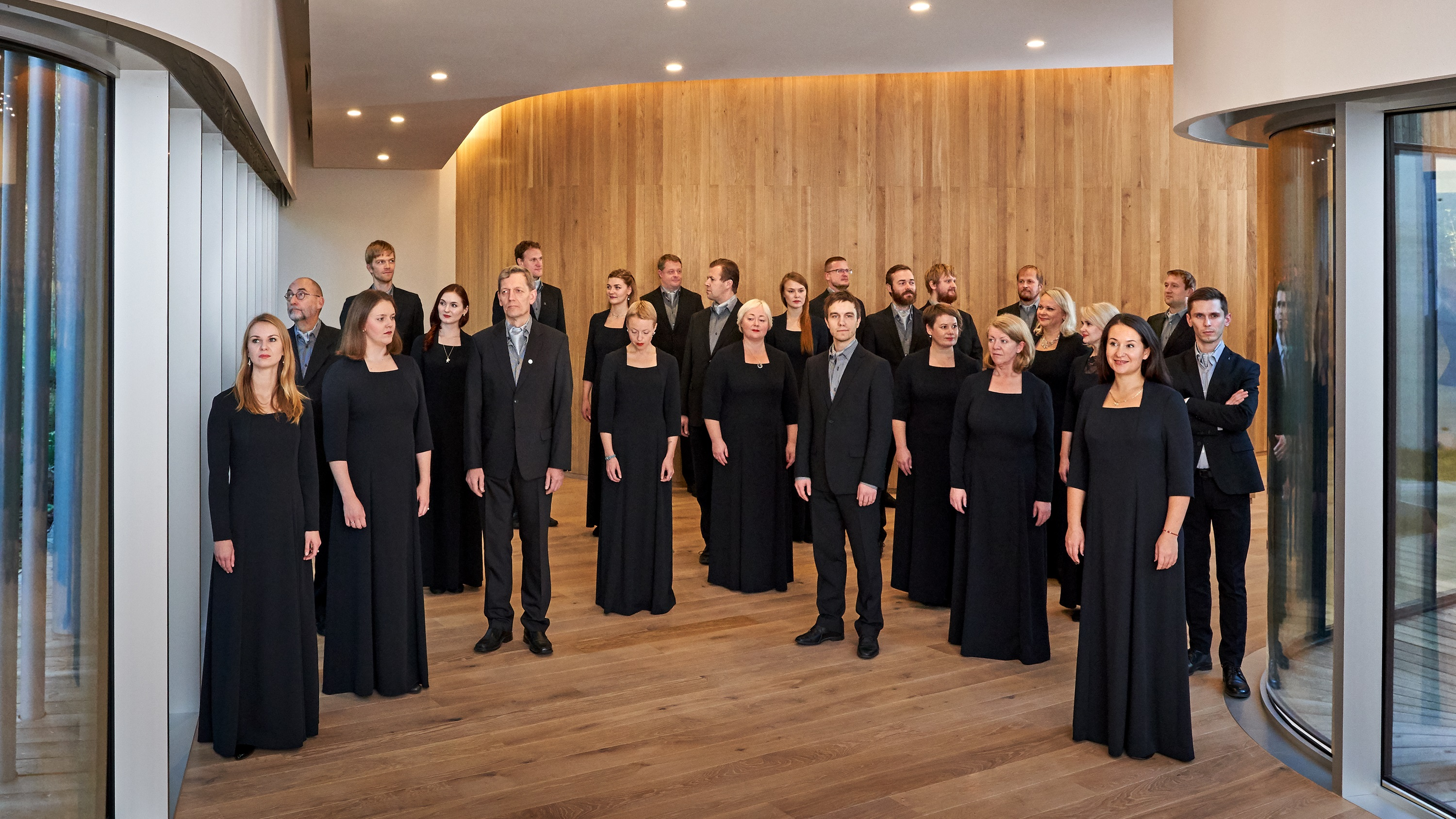
Estonian Philharmonic Chamber Choir

The Estonian Philharmonic Chamber Choir (EPCC) is an Estonian professional choir administratively based in Tallinn. The repertoire of the EPCC ranges from Gregorian Chant to modern works, particularly those of Estonian composers Arvo Pärt and Veljo Tormis.

== History ==
Tõnu Kaljuste founded the EPCC in 1981, and served as its first artistic director and chief conductor until 2001. In 2001, Paul Hillier succeeded Kaljuste as principal conductor and artistic director and held the posts until 2007. In September 2008, Daniel Reuss became principal conductor and artistic director of the EPCC, holding the posts until 2013. In September 2013, the EPCC named Kaljuste as its honorary conductor. From 2014 to 2021, Kaspars Putniņš served as artistic director and chief conductor of the EPCC.

In 2021, Kaljuste returned to the EPCC to begin his second tenure as its artistic director and chief conductor. In August 2024, the EPCC announced an extension of Kaljuste's contract as artistic director and chief conductor through the 2025-2026 season.

Two recordings by the EPCC have won the Grammy Award for Best Choral Performance:

- 2007, Arvo Pärt's Da pacem
- 2014, Pärt's Adam's Lament, where the EPCC shared this award with Tui Hirv and Rainer Vilu, Sinfonietta Rīga and the Tallinn Chamber Orchestra, the Latvian Radio Choir, and Vox Clamantis.

In 2018, the EPCC and Putniņš won a Gramophone Award for its recording of Magnificat and Nunc dimittis by Arvo Pärt and Psalms of Repentance by Alfred Schnittke.

== Artistic Directors and Chief Conductors ==
- Tõnu Kaljuste (1981–2001)
- Paul Hillier (2001–2007)
- Daniel Reuss (2008–2013)
- Kaspars Putniņš (2014–2021)
- Tõnu Kaljuste (2021–present)

== Selected Discography ==
- Veljo Tormis: Forgotten Peoples (1992)
- Arvo Pärt: Te Deum (1993)
- Kaunimad laulud (The Most Beautiful Songs) (1994)
- Arvo Pärt: Litany (1996)
- Erkki-Sven Tüür: Crystallisatio (1996)
- Veljo Tormis: Casting a Spell (1996)
- Arvo Pärt: Beatus (1997)
- Arvo Pärt: Kanon Pokajanen (1998)
- Veljo Tormis: Litany to Thunder (1999)
- Karl August Hermann, Raimo Kangro, Leelo Tungal: Eesti lauleldused (Estonian Singspiels) (1999)
- Paul Giger: Ignis (2000)
- Wolfgang Amadeus Mozart: Litaniae (2000)
- Wolfgang Amadeus Mozart: Vesperae et Litania (2000)
- Veljo Tormis: Laulu palju (Liederhaufen) (2000)
- Antonio Vivaldi: Gloria, Settings from the Mass and Vespers (2003)
- Baltic Voices 1 (2002)
- Antonio Vivaldi: Salmi a due cori (2002)
- The Powers of Heaven (2003)
- Baltic Voices 2 (2004)
- Baltic Voices 3 (2005)
- Lepo Sumera: Mushroom Cantata (2005)
- Rachmaninov: All-Night Vigil (2005)
- A New Joy (2006)
- Arvo Pärt: Da pacem (2006)
- Tarik O'Regan & Guillaume de Machaut: Scattered Rhymes (2008)
- Toivo Tulev: Songs (2008)
- Arvo Pärt: In Principio (2009)
- Baltic Runes (2010)
- Erkki-Sven Tüür: Awakening / The Wanderer's Evening Song / Insula Deserta (2011)
- Siin on Ilus Elada (2014)
- Carlo Gesualdo / Erkki-Sven Tüür / Brett Dean (2015)
- Gregory Rose: Danse macabre (2015)
- Sibelius: 'Complete Works for Mixed Choir' (2015)
- Schnittke: Concerto for Choir, Three Sacred Hymns / Pärt: Seven Magnificat-Antiphons (2021)
- Rachmaninoff: Liturgy of St. John Chrysostom (2022)
- Olivier Deriviere: A Plague Tale: Requiem - Main Theme (2022)
