= Tõnu Kaljuste =

Estonian conductor (born 1953)

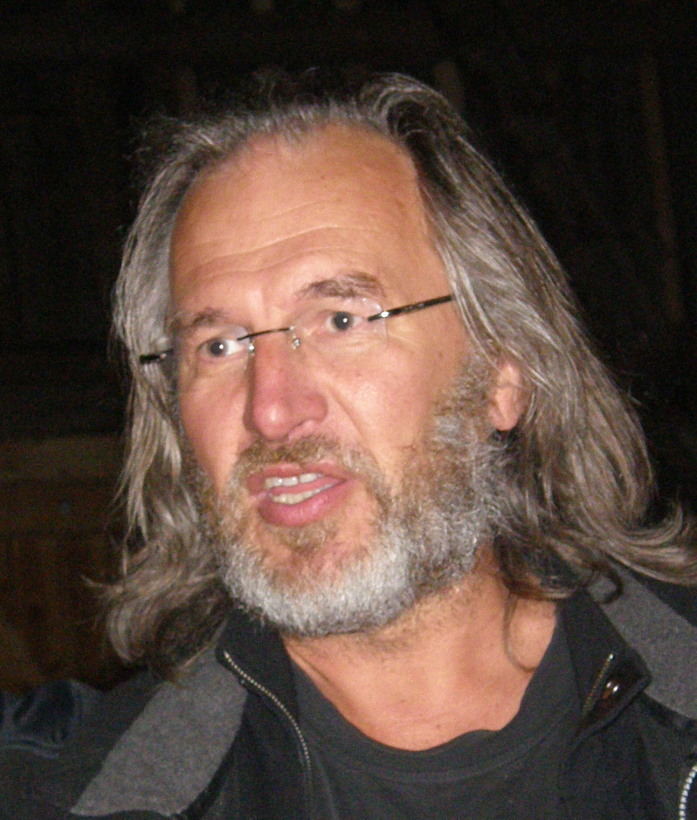
Tõnu Kaljuste (2008)

Tõnu Kaljuste (born August 28, 1953) is an Estonian conductor.

Born in Tallinn, Kaljuste is the son of Heino Kaljuste (1925–1989), an Estonian choral conductor, and Lia Kaljuste, a radio journalist. Tõnu sang in his father's choirs as a child and graduated from the Tallinn Music High School (Tallinna Muusikakeskkool) in 1971. He completed a graduate degree at the Tallinn Conservatory in 1976, studying with Jüri Variste and Roman Matsov, and continued as a postgraduate at the Leningrad Conservatory until 1978.

Kaljuste took his father's role as leader of the Ellerhein Chamber choir in 1974, an ensemble that performed choral works ranging from Renaissance music to contemporary avant-garde music. He was professor of choral conducting at the Tallinn Conservatory from 1978 to 1980 and won the Best Conductor prize at the 1980 Béla Bartók International Choral Competition. With financial support from the Estonian government, Kaljuste turned the Ellerhein Chamber Choir into a full-time ensemble and renamed it the Estonian Philharmonic Chamber Choir in 1981. Kaljuste also conducted with the Estonian National Opera between 1978 and 1995.

In October 1980, Kaljuste was a signatory of the Letter of 40 Intellectuals, a public letter in which forty prominent Estonian intellectuals defended the Estonian language and protested the Russification policies of the Kremlin in Estonia. The signatories also expressed their unease against Republic-level government in harshly dealing with youth protests in Tallinn that were sparked a week earlier due to the banning of a public performance of the punk rock band Propeller.

After Estonia regained independence in 1991, many of the barriers to international performing and recording were lifted, and Kaljuste became well known for his recordings on ECM Records of the works of Estonian composers such as Veljo Tormis, Erkki-Sven Tüür, Heino Eller, and Arvo Pärt. In 1993, he formed the Tallinn Chamber Orchestra; he was also principal conductor of the Swedish Radio Choir between 1994 and 2000, as well as of the Netherlands Chamber Choir (1998–2000).

Aside from Estonian composers, Kaljuste has also recorded works of Beethoven, Penderecki, Alfred Schnittke, Rachmaninov, Mozart, Sergei Taneyev, Vivaldi, and others.

In 2014, Kaljuste was listed by the Estonian World as the second most outstanding Estonian in that year, right behind Arvo Pärt. Tõnu Kaljuste has won a Grammy Award in the Best Choral Performance category for his work on composer Arvo Pärt’s album “Adam’s Lament” at the 56th Annual Grammy Awards in Los Angeles. On 10 May 2019 Tõnu Kaljuste was presented with the International Classical Music Award (ICMA) in the category of Contemporary Music at a gala event in Lucerne, Switzerland. Kaljuste received the award for his recording of Arvo Pärt’s four symphonies with the NFM Wrocław Philharmonic Orchestra (ECM).

In 1980, he married actress Ülle Kaljuste (née Side); the couple later divorced.

== Discography ==
- Arvo Pärt: The Symphonies (ECM, 2018)
- Heino Eller: Neenia (ECM, 2001)
- Alfred Schnittke: Psalms of Repentance (ECM, 1999)
- Ignis (ECM, 1998) (With Paul Giger)
- Arvo Pärt: Kanon Pokajanen (ECM, 1998)
- Arvo Pärt: Litany (ECM, 1996)
- Arvo Pärt: Te Deum (ECM, 1993)
- Veljo Tormis: Forgotten Peoples (ECM, 1992)
