= Marie-Louise Dähler =

Swiss harpsichordist

Marie-Louise Dähler is a Swiss harpsichordist. As such, she is a basso continuo player, chamber music partner and soloist with a focus on improvisation.

== Life ==
Dähler grew up in Bern in a family of musicians. She began playing the harpsichord at the age of five. She studied pedagogy at the LehrerInnenseminar Muristalden in Bern, and harpsichord with her father, Jörg Ewald Dähler, at the Hochschule der Künste Bern, graduating with a diploma as a harpsichord pedagogue. She studied further at the Musikakademie St. Gallen, and with Johann Sonnleitner at the Zürcher Hochschule der Künste, graduating with a concert diploma. She passed her diplomas with distinction. Together with Wolfgang Schulz, solo flutist of the Vienna Philharmonic, she recorded Bach's flute sonatas.

Since 1999, she has collaborated with the Swiss violinist Paul Giger. She performs regularly as a soloist and in chamber music ensembles. She has also worked as a music teacher, in St. Gallen from 2004.

== Recordings ==
- Changements, Rudolf Kelterborn, München / Col-Legno 1995
- Towards Silence, with Paul Giger, ECM-Records-Verlag, Gräfelfing / Universal Music, Berlin 2007
