= Nederlands Kamerkoor =

Nederlands choir

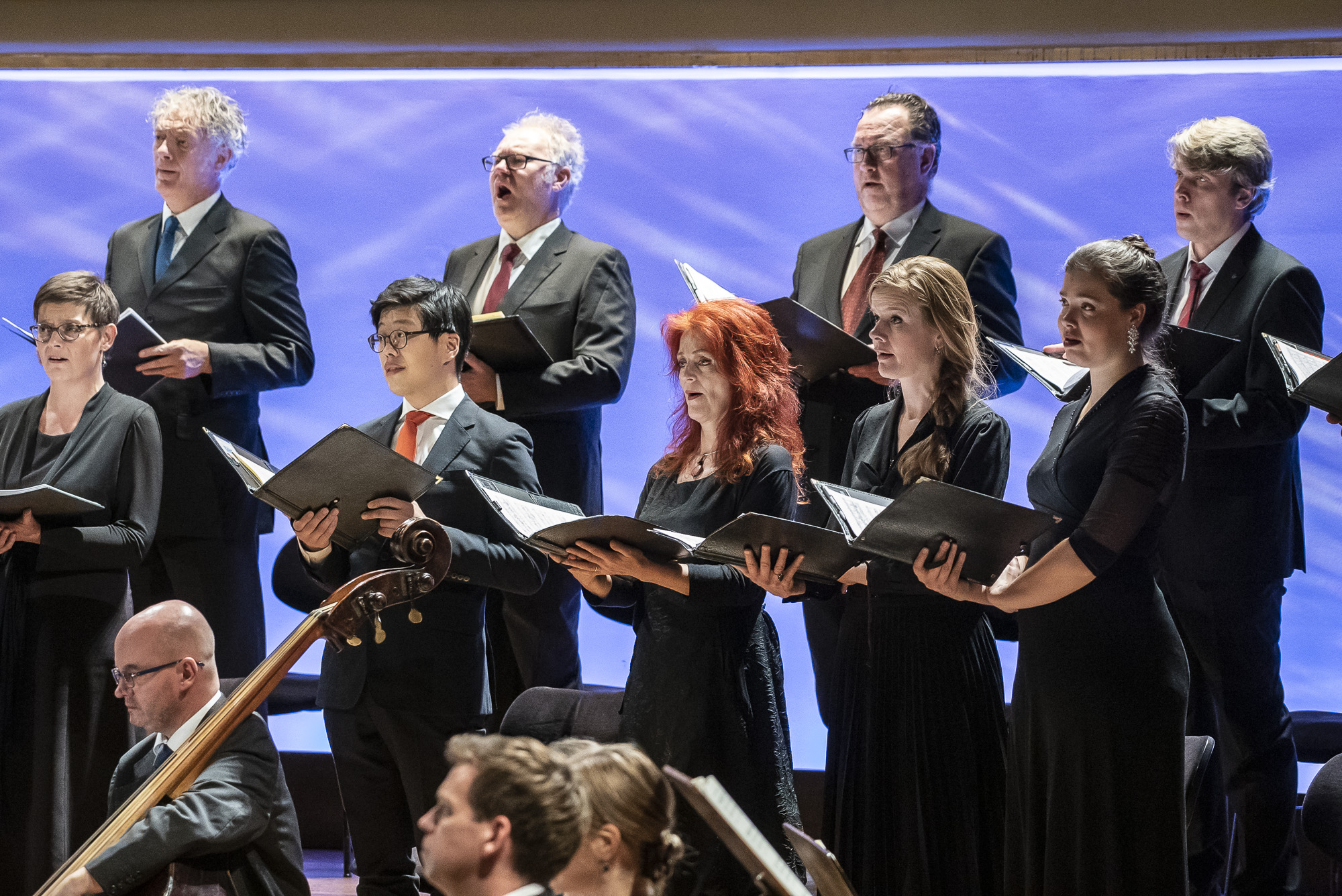
Nederlands Kamerkoor, Prague 2018

The Netherlands Chamber Choir (Dutch: Nederlands Kamerkoor) is a Dutch choir. Administratively based in Utrecht, the ensemble presents its concerts in several Dutch cities.

== History ==
The Nederlands Kamerkoor performing at the St. Peter's Church, Utrecht (2026)

In 1937, Felix de Nobel founded the choir as the Chorus Pro Musica specifically to perform Bach cantatas for the Dutch radio network Omroepvereniging VARA. The choir first performed publicly in 1939 in Haarlem under the name of the Nederlandsch Kamerkoor. Following World War II, the ensemble toured to the UK in 1948, to Perugia in 1949, and a return to the UK at Edinburgh Festival in 1951. In 1951, the Dutch government awarded the choir its first government grant, which became a regular subsidy in 1953. In 1965, the Nederlands Koorstichting (Netherlands Choral Foundation) was established with subsidy from the Dutch government, and became the official employer of the choir.

In 1972, de Nobel stood down as director of the choir. His successor was Hans van den Hombergh, from 1972 to 1976, and during his tenure, he incorporated greater use of historical performance practice. Kerry Woodward succeeded van den Hombergh as chief conductor from 1977 to 1980. The choir then went without a chief conductor from 1980 to 1988, choosing to work regularly with guest conductors particularly in the area of the period-performance movement, including Gustav Leonhardt, Nicolaus Harnoncourt, Ton Koopman, Jos van Immerseel, Paul Van Nevel, Christopher Hogwood, Roger Norrington, Andrew Parrott, Peter Phillips and William Christie.

In 1988, the choir returned to having a chief conductor with the appointment of Uwe Gronostay, whose tenure was from 1988 to 1997. Tido Visser became general and artistic director of the choir in July 2013. The current chief conductor of the choir is Peter Dijkstra, since the 2015-2016 season. Visser took the simplified title of artistic director in 2022, with the advent of Laura de By as business director of the choir. In July 2025, the choir announced that Visser is to stand down as its artistic director on 1 January 2026.

Composers such as Francis Poulenc, Frank Martin, Rudolf Escher, Hendrik Andriessen, Mauricio Kagel, Sir John Tavener and Henk Badings composed for the choir, and more recently Sir Harrison Birtwistle, Fred Momotenko and James MacMillan. The choir has featured on commercial recordings on such labels as Chandos Records, Naxos, and RCO Live.

== Selected discography ==
- 'Tehilim': Psalms between Judaism and Christianity. Psalm settings by Tzvi Avni, Sim Gokkes, Louis Lewandowski, Yossele Rosenblatt, de:Balduin Sulzer, Mendelssohn, Salomone Rossi, Schoenberg, Sweelinck. Gilad Nezer (soloist). Netherlands Chamber Choir, conducted Klaas Stok. Globe 2012

== Chief conductors ==
- Felix de Nobel (1937–1972)
- Hans van de Hombergh (1972–1976)
- Kerry Woodward (1977–1980)
- Uwe Gronostay (1988–1997)
- Tõnu Kaljuste (1998–2000)
- Stephen Layton (2002–2005)
- Risto Joost (2011–2015)
- Peter Dijkstra (2015–present)
