= Re:ECM =

Studio album by Ricardo Villalobos and Max Loderbauer
- Released: 2011
- Genres: Minimal techno; jazz
- Length: 134:27
- Label: ECM
- Producers: Ricardo Villalobos; Max Loderbauer; Manfred Eicher (original recordings)

Re:ECM is a 2011 album by minimal techno producers Ricardo Villalobos and Max Loderbauer. It uses recordings released on the ECM Records label primarily associated with jazz and contemporary classical music as the basis for the tracks.

== Reception ==
The album received mostly positive reviews in specialized medias, while The Guardian, for instance, remains somehow more mixed in its overall favourable comments.

== Track listing ==
Track number	Track name	Length	Original artist	Original recording
Disc 1 Track 1	Reblop	8:20	Christian Wallumrød Ensemble	Fabula Suite Lugano
Disc 1 Track 2	Recat	7:15	Christian Wallumrød Ensemble	The Zoo Is Far
Disc 1 Track 3	Resvete	11:40	Alexander Knaifel	Svete Tikhiy
Disc 1 Track 4	Retimeless	4:29	John Abercrombie	Timeless
Disc 1 Track 5	Reemergence	9:49	Miroslav Vitous	Emergence
Disc 1 Track 6	Reblazhenstva	7:40	Alexander Knaifel	Blazhenstva
Disc 1 Track 7	Reannounce	6:36	Louis Sclavis	L'Impafait Des Langues
Disc 1 Track 8	Recurrence	7:20	Wolfert Brederode Quartet	Currents
Disc 1 Track 9	Requote	4:06	Christian Wallumrød Ensemble	Fabula Suite Lugano
Disc 2 Track 1	Replob	4:23	Christian Wallumrød Ensemble	Fabula Suite Lugano
Disc 2 Track 2	Reshadub	10:41	Paul Giger	Ignis
Disc 2 Track 3	Rebird	4:34	Enrico Rava/Stefano Bollani/Paul Motian	Tati
Disc 2 Track 4	Retikhiy	6:27	Alexander Knaifel	Svete Tikhiy
Disc 2 Track 5	Rekondakion	6:28	Arvo Pärt	Kanon Pokajanen
Disc 2 Track 6	Rensenada	10:42	Bennie Maupin	The Jewel in the Lotus
Disc 2 Track 7	Resole	13:25	Alexander Knaifel	Svete Tikhiy / Amicta Sole
Disc 2 Track 8	Redetach	10:40	Christian Wallumrød Ensemble	Fabula Suite Lugano
