= Don and Sherri =

EP by Matthew Dear
- Released: October 16, 2007
- Genre: Microhouse
- Length: 23:27 (12"); 18:44 (digital download)
- Label: Ghostly International
- Producer: Matthew Dear

Don and Sherri is an EP released by Matthew Dear on Ghostly International Records on October 16, 2007. It was released simultaneously on 12" and digital download. It features a remix by M.A.N.D.Y., a cover by Hot Chip, and a remix of "Elementary Lover" by DJ Koze of Fischmob.

== Track listing ==
=== 12" ===
A1. "Don and Sherri" - 3:24
A2. "Don and Sherri (M.A.N.D.Y. Remix)" - 7:38
B1. "Don and Sherri (Hot Chip Version)" - 4:15
B2. "Don and Sherri (Hot Chip Version Instrumental)" - 4:15
B3. "Elementary Lover (DJ Koze Remix) - 3:53

=== Digital Download ===
1. "Don and Sherri" - 3:24
2. "Don and Sherri (M.A.N.D.Y. Remix) [Radio Edit]" - 3:55
3. "Don and Sherri (Hot Chip Version)" - 4:15
4. "Don and Sherri (Hot Chip Version Instrumental)" - 4:15
5. "Elementary Lover (DJ Koze Remix) - 3:53
