= 2007 (album) =

Studio album by False
- Released: July 23, 2007
- Genre: Minimal techno
- Length: 59:55
- Label: Minus
- Producer: Matthew Dear

Professional ratings
Review scores
Source	Rating
Dusted Magazine	(favorable)
Hot Press	3/5 stars
Resident Advisor	4.5/5 stars
XLR8R	(favorable)

2007 is a dark minimal techno album by Matthew Dear under his pseudonym of False. It is Dear's first mix album.

== Development ==
Matthew Dear began developing the 2007 album due to unreleased material beginning to build up on his hard drives. Disliking having unused tracks, Dear talked with his label Minus about using the material to create an album that was to be different from his previous works. The album was developed as a dark and rhythmless mix, which was "a big turn on to complete the album" for Dear. Dear describes the process of creating 2007 as like creating two separate albums: first focusing on creating individual tracks and then working on bringing them together as a seamless work. Dear titled the album 2007 due to it being completed in said year, to give it a stamp of timeliness, and to avoid applying a forced narrative to the music.

== Release ==
A vinyl single was released of "Fed on Youth", with a B-side of "Face the Rain".

== Reception ==
No matter how many times you listen to 2007, you just can't quite get a hold of what’s going on or where you will end up. One day you need volume to ‘get it’, the next intimacy and quiet. Another day it's all too slow and without flesh, the next it is pure sculptured genius.

— Resident Advisor review

Resident Advisor—an online magazine with a focus on electronic music—named 2007 as the 10th best album of 2007. In their review of the album, RA described 2007 as "mystifying" and praised it for "dodging every effort to be understood." XLR8R called the album a "pinnacle of minimal-techno artistry", and Dusted Magazine praised its "perfect balance between austerity and propulsion." However, Hot Press criticised 2007 for not capturing the zeitgeist of the actual year 2007.

== Track listing ==
All tracks are written by Matthew Dear.

No.	Title	Length
1.	"Indy 3000"	2:51
2.	"Meat Me in the Markt"	4:56
3.	"Warm Co."	2:24
4.	"Timing"	2:04
5.	"Alright Liar"	3:42
6.	"Plus Plus"	4:02
7.	"Face the Rain"	2:15
8.	"Dollar Down"	4:02
9.	"Disease/George Washington"	4:03
10.	"Act Like Children/Excalibur"	4:41
11.	"In the Heather"	2:11
12.	"Fed on Youth/HLM/DLG"	7:14
13.	"Stomachs/Ankle Biter"	8:52
14.	"Forgetting"	6:37

Digital bonus tracks
No.	Title	Length
15.	"Meat Me in the Markt (Digital Bonus Track Version)"	8:14
16.	"Alright Liar (Digital Bonus Track Version)"	5:45
17.	"Bull in the Heather (Digital Bonus Track Version)"	7:55
