= Involv3r =

Compilation album by Sasha
- Released: 18 March 2013
- Genre: Electronic
- Length: 78:58
- Label: Ministry of Sound
- Producer: Sasha

Sasha chronology
Invol2ver (2008)	Involv3r (2013)	Scene Delete (2016)

Professional ratings
Review scores
Source	Rating
Resident Advisor	3.5/5 stars

Involv3r (stylised as Invol<3r) is a mix album by Welsh DJ Sasha, released on 18 March 2013 through Ministry of Sound. It is the third mix album in the Involver series, following 2008's Invol2ver. Like its predecessors, tracks from other artists have each been remixed to give Sasha's own interpretation of them. Upon release, the album charted at number 1 and number 6 on the UK Dance Albums and UK Compilation charts respectively.

== Track listing ==
No.	Title	Artist(s)	Length
1.	"Growing Forehead" (Sasha Involv3r Remix)	Taragana Pyjarama featuring Kicki Halmos	7:35
2.	"Turn the Tide" (Sasha Involv3r Remix)	ThermalBear featuring Arrows Down	4:09
3.	"Crystalfilm" (Sasha Involv3r Remix)	Little Dragon	5:32
4.	"Chained" (Sasha Involv3r Remix)	The xx	6:42
5.	"Battleships" (Sasha Involv3r Remix)	Benjamin Damage and Doc Daneeka featuring Abigail Wyles	6:58
6.	"Smalltalk" (Sasha Involv3r Remix)	Ultraísta	6:49
7.	"Moment Before Dreaming" (Sasha Involv3r Remix)	The Ananda Project	6:54
8.	"The Healing" (Sasha Involv3r Remix)	James Zabiela	7:13
9.	"Wine" (Sasha Involv3r Remix)	Blondes	5:30
10.	"DIY" (Sasha Involv3r Remix)	Keep Shelly in Athens	5:33
11.	"Shoot You Down" (featuring Kicki Halmos)	Sasha	5:52
12.	"Late Night" (Sasha Involv3r Remix)	Foals	10:08
Total length:			78:58

== Charts ==
Chart (2013)	Peak position
UK Compilations (Official Charts Company)	6
UK Dance Albums (Official Charts Company)	1
US Dance/Electronic Albums (Billboard)	23
US Heatseekers Albums (Billboard)	44
