= Beams (Matthew Dear album) =

Studio album by Matthew Dear
- Released: August 27, 2012
- Genre: Electronic
- Length: 49:15
- Label: Ghostly International
- Producer: Matthew Dear

Matthew Dear chronology
Black City (2010)	Beams (2012)

Professional ratings
Aggregate scores
Source	Rating
Metacritic	78/100
Review scores
Source	Rating
AllMusic	4/5 stars
The A.V. Club	B
Clash	8/10
Consequence of Sound	B
Paste	7.8/10
Pitchfork	7.3/10
PopMatters	9/10
Resident Advisor	4.0/5
Tiny Mix Tapes	3/5 marks

Beams is the fifth studio album by Matthew Dear. It was released via Ghostly International in 2012.

== Critical reception ==
At Metacritic, which assigns a weighted average score out of 100 to reviews from mainstream critics, Beams received an average score of 78% based on 29 reviews, indicating "generally favorable reviews".

AllMusic named it one of their "Favorite Electronic Albums of 2012". Clash placed it at number 28 on its list of the "Top 40 Albums of 2012". MusicOMH named it the 3rd best album of 2012.

== Track listing ==
Beams track listing
No.	Title	Length
1.	"Her Fantasy"	6:16
2.	"Earthforms"	3:35
3.	"Headcage"	3:48
4.	"Fighting Is Futile"	5:01
5.	"Up & Out"	4:17
6.	"Overtime"	3:13
7.	"Get the Rhyme Right"	3:49
8.	"Ahead of Myself"	3:51
9.	"Do the Right Thing"	4:43
10.	"Shake Me"	4:33
11.	"Temptation"	6:09

Expanded edition bonus tracks
No.	Title	Length
12.	"She's Just That Way"	3:15
13.	"Crimewaves"	3:42
14.	"In the Middle (I Met You There)" (featuring Jonny Pierce)	3:50
15.	"Street Song"	3:37
16.	"Around a Fountain"	4:16
17.	"Flunker"	3:37
18.	"Earthforms" (Tobacco Remix)	3:19
19.	"Earthforms" (Jesse Lanza Remix)	6:32
20.	"Earthforms" (Michna Remix)	3:22
21.	"Her Fantasy" (Poolside Remix)	6:04
22.	"Her Fantasy" (Tornado Wallace Remix)	7:19
23.	"Fighting Is Futile" (Seth Troxler Remix)	8:00
24.	"Fighting Is Futile" (Kink Remix)	6:12
25.	"Fighting Is Futile" (Benoit & Sergio Remix)	8:21
26.	"Fighting Is Futile" (Laid Back Remix)	4:08
27.	"Fighting Is Futile" (Kink Extended Dub)	6:08

== Charts ==
Chart performance for Beams
Chart (2012)	Peak position
US Top Dance Albums (Billboard)	14
