= Invol2ver =

Compilation album by Sasha
- Released: 8 September 2008
- Genre: Progressive house, breaks
- Label: Global Underground Ltd.
- Producer: Sasha

Sasha chronology
The emFire Collection: Mixed, Unmixed & Remixed (2008)	Invol2ver (2008)	Involv3r (2013)

Professional ratings
Review scores
Source	Rating
Clash	(Positive)
Progressive-Sounds	9/10 stars
Resident Advisor	4/5 stars

Invol2ver is a mix album by Welsh DJ Sasha, released on 8 September 2008 through British record label Global Underground. It was released as a sequel to his 2004 mix album, Involver. Like its predecessor, tracks from other artists have each been remixed to give Sasha's own interpretation of them. A follow-up was released in 2013, titled Involv3r.

== Track listing ==
No.	Title	Artist	Length
1.	"Intro"	Badger	1:57
2.	"You Are the Worst Thing in the World"	Telefon Tel Aviv	7:09
3.	"Flesh"	Rone	5:07
4.	"Eclipse"	Sasha vs. Ray LaMontagne	5:53
5.	"Lowlife"	Sasha vs. Adam Parker	3:53
6.	"Midnight"	Charlie May	2:46
7.	"Arcadia"	Apparat	6:41
8.	"That You Might"	Home Video	7:33
9.	"Destroy Everything You Touch"	Ladytron	7:19
10.	"Couleurs"	M83	5:15
11.	"The Eraser"	Thom Yorke	3:30
12.	"3 Little Piggys"	Sasha	7:12
13.	"Sometimes I Realise"	Engineers	8:51

Limited edition bonus disc
No.	Title	Artist	Length
1.	"The Eraser (Sasha Coma Remix)"	Thom Yorke	5:37
2.	"Flavor (Sasha Invol2ver Remix)"	Girls in Hawaii	6:59
3.	"Burma (Invol2ver Dub Mix)"	Lostep	9:26
4.	"Gas Tank (Sasha Invol2ver Remix)"	Home Video	4:26
5.	"Midnight (Extended Mix)"	Charlie May	5:21
6.	"Eclipse (CM Dub Mix)"	Sasha vs. Ray LaMontagne	9:52

== Charts ==
Chart (2008)	Peak position
UK Compilations (Official Charts Company)	19
UK Dance Albums (Official Charts Company)	1
US Dance/Electronic Albums (Billboard)	9
US Heatseekers Albums (Billboard)	10
US Independent Albums (Billboard)	40
