= Fabric 36 =

Compilation album by Ricardo Villalobos
- Released: 10 September 2007
- Genres: Minimal techno, microhouse
- Label: Fabric
- Producer: Ricardo Villalobos

Ricardo Villalobos chronology
Fizheuer Zieheuer (2006)	Fabric 36 (2007)	Sei Es Drum (2007)

Fabric Mix Series chronology
Fabric 35 (2007)	Fabric 36 (2007)	Fabric 37 (2007)

Professional ratings
Review scores
Source	Rating
Pitchfork	(8.7/10)

Fabric 36 is a 2007 album by Ricardo Villalobos. Whilst the album was released as part of the Fabric mix CD series, it is composed entirely of new material by Villalobos and several collaborators, and as such could be considered a full studio album. It is the first fabric mix to contain only an artist's own work since Pure Science's Fabric 05. "Andruic", "Fizpatrick", "Primer encuentro Latino-Americano" and "Farenzer House" were later released unedited on Villalobos' next album, Sei Es Drum.

== Track listing ==
=== CD ===
1. Ricardo Villalobos - Groove 1880
2. Ricardo Villalobos - Perc and Drums
3. Ricardo Villalobos - Moongomery
4. Ricardo Villalobos - Farenzer House
5. Ricardo Villalobos & Patrick Ense - M.Bassy
6. Ricardo Villalobos - Mecker
7. Ricardo Villalobos & Jorge Gonzales - 4 Wheel Drive
8. Ricardo Villalobos & Patrick Ense - Fizpatrick
9. Ricardo Villalobos & Andrew Gillings - Andruic & Japan
10. Ricardo Villalobos - Organic Tranceplant
11. Ricardo Villalobos - Prevorent
12. Ricardo Villalobos & Fumiya Tanaka - Fumiyandric 2
13. Ricardo Villalobos - Won't You Tell Me
14. Ricardo Villalobos - Primer Encuentro Latino-Americano
15. Ricardo Villalobos - Chropuspel Zündung
