= Alcachofa (album) =

Studio album by Ricardo Villalobos
- Released: September 19, 2003
- Genre: Minimal techno; minimal house
- Length: 77:36 (CD); 67:37 (vinyl)
- Label: Playhouse
- Producer: Ricardo Villalobos

Ricardo Villalobos chronology
Alcachofa (2003)	Thé Au Harem D'Archimède (2004)

Alcachofa is the first studio album released by Chilean-German producer Ricardo Villalobos on the German house label Playhouse on September 19, 2003. The album cemented Villalobos's place in the vanguards of microhouse and minimal techno.

The vinyl edition contains an alternative track listing, as "What You Say Is More Than I Can Say" was already released in its full version on the EP Halma. "La Raja", "Quizás" and "Fusion the Enemies" remain exclusive to vinyl, while CD cuts "Waiworinao" and "Fools Garden" were later released on vinyl as part of the EP Alcachofa Tools. "Y.G.H." remains exclusive to the CD pressing.

In 2015, Villalobos would re-issue "Easy Lee" and "Dexter" on his Sei Es Drum label as a 12 in (300 mm) vinyl.

== Critical reception ==
Professional ratings
Review scores
Source	Rating
AllMusic	5/5 stars
Pitchfork	8.1/10
Stylus Magazine	A

Andy Kellman of AllMusic commented that Villalobos "is in complete control of his machines at all times, and he makes them do strange things that no one else can."

New York placed Alcachofa at #6 on the Top Albums of the 2003. Pitchfork placed Alcachofa at #165 on The Top 200 Albums of the 2000s. Resident Advisor voted Alcachofa at #1 on the Top 100 Albums of the 2000s. Stylus Decade placed Alachofa at #73 on the Top Albums of the 2000s.

In 2025, Resident Advisor ranked it third in their list of "The Best Electronic Records 2000–25"; contributor Carlos Hawthorn called it "a minimal house and techno album of infinite subtlety and elegance; a suite of vocoder gems, guitar jams, deep-in-the-night tearjerkers and free-flying loops that still have us under their spell today. The LP inspired a movement and unmasked the scene's hottest new DJ as a virtuoso composer."

== Track listing ==
All tracks are written by Ricardo Villalobos.

CD track listing
No.	Title	Length
1.	"Easy Lee"	10:06
2.	"Y.G.H."	8:16
3.	"Bahaha hahi"	7:35
4.	"I Try to Live (Can I Live)"	9:21
5.	"Waiworinao"	8:10
6.	"Theogenese"	9:19
7.	"What You Say Is More Than I Can Say (edit)"	8:02
8.	"Dexter"	9:05
9.	"Fools Garden (Black Conga)"	7:42

Vinyl edition

On vinyl, sides A, B, D and F are at 45 RPM, while sides C and E play at 33 1/3 RPM.

Side A
No.	Title	Length
1.	"Easy Lee"	10:09

Side B
No.	Title	Length
1.	"Theogenese"	9:21

Side C
No.	Title	Length
1.	"Bahaha hahi"	7:39
2.	"La Raja"	6:02

Side D
No.	Title	Length
1.	"I Try to Live (Can I Live)"	9:25

Side E
No.	Title	Length
1.	"Quizás" ("Perhaps")	7:27
2.	"Fusion the Enemies"	7:23

Side F
No.	Title	Length
1.	"Dexter"	9:11

== Personnel ==
- Ricardo Villalobos – writer, producer
- Saskia – cover artwork
