= EmFire =

Record label

- Parent company: Renaissance Recordings
- Founded: 2007
- Founder: Alexander Coe
- Genre: Electronica; Tech House; Progressive House; Minimal
- Country of origin: United Kingdom
- Official website: www.emfiremusic.com

emFire is a sublabel of Renaissance Recordings which is run by Sasha as an exclusive outlet for his original material.

== History ==
In August 2007, Sasha announced the formation of his record label, Emfire, which will be the exclusive outlet for his new material in both vinyl and digital formats. Its first release is "COMA", a collaborative track by a group of the same name which features Sasha, Barry Jamieson, Charlie May, and Duncan Forbes. In 2008 the label released a collection of remixes of the tracks "Coma," "Park it in Shade," "Who Killed Sparky?" and "Mongoose." The second disc contains edits of the mentioned songs, as well as all the score from the surf film "New Emissions of Light & Sound" mixed into one song, all tracks where originally produced and mixed by Sasha.

== Catalog ==
All release by Alexander Coe.

- EmFire 001DIG Coma
- EmFire 002DIG Park It in the Shade
- EmFire 003DIG Who Killed Sparky?
- EmFire 004DIG Mongoose
- EFBOOT001 Coma (Remixes)
- EmFire 005DIG The EmFire Collection: Mixed, Unmixed & Remixed
- EmFire 005ii The EmFire Collection: Club Remixes
- EmFire 005L Park it in the Shade (Audion Ain't Got No Friends Mix)
- EmFire 006DIGX Spring Club Tour 2008
- EmFire 007DIG 3 Little Piggys

== See also ==
List of electronic music record labels
