= Paul Giger =

Swiss violinist and composer (born 1952)

Paul Giger (born 1952 in Herisau, Appenzell Ausserrhoden, northeastern Switzerland), is a Swiss violinist and composer. He plays contemporary classical music, jazz, and free improvised music, and specializes in extended techniques.

He has released seven CDs on the ECM label and collaborated with the Hilliard Ensemble, Jan Garbarek, Pierre Favre and Marie-Louise Dähler.

== Discography ==
- Chartres (ECM, 1989)
- Alpstein (ECM, 1991)
- Schattenwelt (ECM, 1993)
- Ignis (ECM, 1998)
- Vindonissa (ECM, 2003)
- Towards Silence (ECM, 2007)
- trans limen ad lumen (DIVOX, 2017)
- ars moriendi (ECM, 2022)
