= Perlon =

Electronic music record label

Perlon is an electronic music record label founded in 1997 in Frankfurt, Germany, now based in Berlin, and run by Thomas Franzmann aka Zip and Markus Nikolai. It is a minimal techno and tech house label which has been characterised as one of the most influential German dance music labels.

Its catalogue features music by producers such as A Guy Called Gerald, Akufen, Ricardo Villalobos, Baby Ford, Dandy Jack, Luciano, Matt John, Pantytec, Stefan Goldmann, Thomas Melchior and San Proper. It is mostly a vinyl label, apart from compilations and some artist albums released on CD. No releases have been made available online in digital formats.

Perlon gained international attention with Markus Nikolai's 2000 dance floor hit "Bushes" and the label compilation "Superlongevity 2" in the following year. In his book Energy Flash about rave music and dance culture, Simon Reynolds called Perlon one of the leading labels of its second decade.

Perlon has run a monthly party named 'Get Perlonized' in Berlin. The record label is known for its distinctive graphic design by Chris Rehberger of the graphic design studio Double Standards.
