= Ricardo Villalobos =

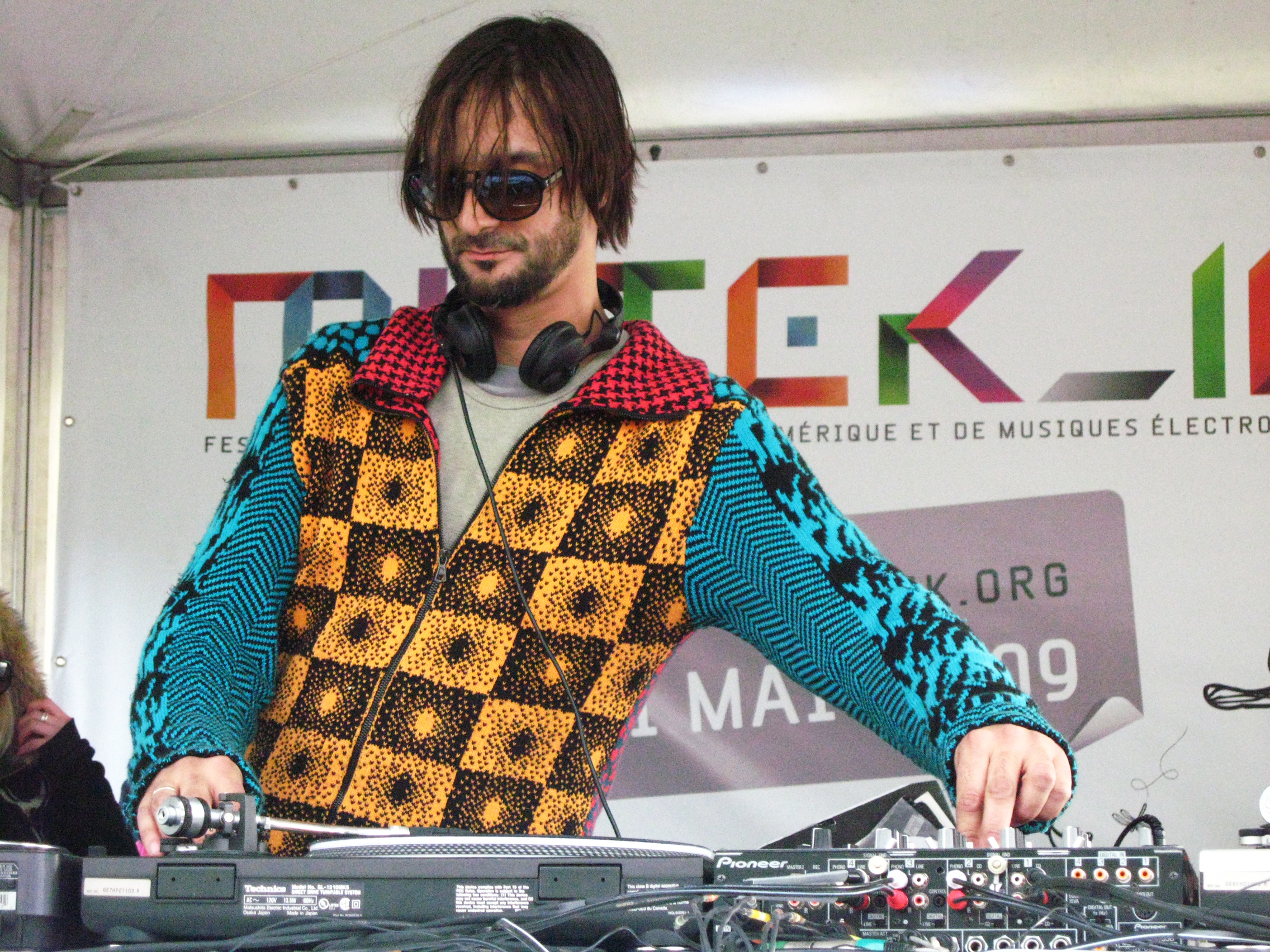

Background information
- Also known as: Bispeed Black, Richard Wolfsdorf, Termiten, Alliv Sobol
- Born: Ricardo Villalobos; August 6, 1970 (age 55) Santiago de Chile, Chile
- Origin: Darmstadt, Germany
- Genres: Microhouse, minimal techno, techno
- Occupations: Disc jockey Record producer
- Years active: 1993–present
- Labels: Sei Es Drum; Perlon; Playhouse; Frisbee Tracks; Sister Phunk; Lo-Fi Stereo; Cadenza Music

Ricardo Villalobos (born 6 August 1970) is a Chilean-born German electronic music producer and DJ. He is well known for his work in the minimal techno and microhouse genres, and is one of the most significant figures in the minimal techno scene.

== Life and work ==
Villalobos was born in Chile on 6 August 1970. In 1973 he moved to Germany with his family to escape the dictatorship of Augusto Pinochet, who had seized power that year.

When Villalobos was around 10 or 11 he started to play conga and bongos. He began making electronic music in the late 80s. From a very young age he has been a big fan of Depeche Mode, following their tours around Europe to listen to them.

Villalobos began to play his music at parties while he was studying at university, but this was only for his own enjoyment. He started a label, Placid Flavour, in 1993 but this was unsuccessful. His first record was released on the German Playhouse label in 1994 and he began DJing as a professional in 1998.

In 2006 Villalobos, along with Richie Hawtin and Luciano, played to around 300,000 people at the Berlin Loveparade.

At the end of 2007, 2008 and 2010, he came first in Resident Advisor's Top 100 DJs of the year.

Villalobos has released several records on various notable labels, such as Perlon, Playhouse and [a:rpia:r].

== Discography ==
=== Studio albums ===
- Alcachofa (2003)
- Thé Au Harem D'Archimède (2004)
- Sei Es Drum (2007)
- Re:ECM with Max Loderbauer (2011)
- Dependent and Happy (2012)
- Empirical House (2017)

=== Compilations ===
- Love Family Trax (2002)
- In the Mix: Taka Taka (2003)
- Green & Blue (2005)
- fabric36 (2007)

=== Singles and EPs ===
- Sinus Poetry EP (1993)
- The Contempt (1995)
- Heike (1995)
- N-DRA (1996)
- Salvador (1998)
- 808 the Bassqueen (1999)
- Frank Mueller Melodram (1999)
- Pino Jet Explosion (1999)
- Ibiza99 (2000)
- Luna (2000)
- Que Belle Epoque (2000)
- Tomorrov Cocktail / Ananas (2000)
- Bredow / Damm 3 (2001)
- Halma (2002)
- 808 The Bass Queen / Filtadelic (2003)
- The Contempt (2004)
- Achso (2005)
- Chromosul (2005)
- For Disco Only 2 (2005)
- Que Belle Epoque 2006 (2006)
- Heike (2006)
- Seive / Jimis (2006)
- Unflug (2006)
- What You Say Is More Than I Can Say (2006)
- What's Wrong My Friends? (2006)
- Fizheuer Zieheuer (2006)
- Enfants (2008)
- Vasco EP part 1 (2008)
- Vasco EP part 2 (2008)
- Peculiar / 3 Züge (2010)
- Any Ideas / Emilio (2012)
- Baby EP (2012)
- Voodog (2014)
- Who Are We? EP (2015)

=== Remixes ===
- 1996 Der Dritte Raum – "Trommelmaschine"
- 1997 Heiko Laux & Johannes Heil – "No Pain No Gain"
- 1997 Sieg Über Die Sonne – "Mogul"
- 1999 Vermittelnde-Elemente – "Modedom"
- 2000 The Horrorist – "One Night in NYC"
- 2000 Heiko Laux – "Moved"
- 2000 Pascal F.E.O.S. – "Are U Tranquilized"
- 2001 Auch – "Tomorrow Goodbye"
- 2001 Two Lone Swordsmen – "Bunker"
- 2002 Auch – "Pick-Up"
- 2002 Thomas Dolby – "One of our Submarines"
- 2002 Jeff Samuel – "Vew"
- 2002 Tony Senghore – "Where Is the Love?"
- 2002 Señor Coconut And His Orchestra – "Electro Latino"
- 2002 Sieg Über Die Sonne – "You'll Never Come Back"
- 2003 Hell – "Listen to the Hiss"
- 2003 Monne Automne – "El Salvador"
- 2003 Spektrum – "Freakbox"
- 2003 Sven Väth – "Cala Llonga"
- 2004 Alter Ego – "Daktari"
- 2004 DJ Minx – "A Walk in the Park"
- 2004 Lopazz – "Migracion"
- 2004 Lucien–N–Luciano – "Alain Brito"
- 2004 Monobox – "Trade"
- 2004 Sieg Über Die Sonne – "Love Is OK"
- 2005 2raumwohnung – "Wir Sind Die Anderen"
- 2005 The KLF – "What Time Is Love?"
- 2005 Sieg Über Die Sonne – "Cleaning Windows"
- 2005 Vegetable Orchestra – "Atavismus"
- 2005 Das Racist - "The Bing Bong Chong-a-Long"
- 2006 Depeche Mode – "The Sinner in Me"
- 2006 Rhythm & Sound with Ras Donovan & Ras Perez – "Let We Go"
- 2006 Señor Coconut And His Orchestra – "Behind the Mask"
- 2007 Beck – "Cellphone's Dead"
- 2007 Ffwd – "Consequences"
- 2007 Innersphere – "Phunk"
- 2007 Plastikman – "Snark"
- 2007 Shackleton – "Blood on My Hands"
- 2008 Sun Electric – "Toninas"
- 2008 Slap - "Eden Now"
- 2010 NDF - "Since We Last Met"
- 2010 DJ Sneak - "Delta Trippin"
- 2010 Wareika - "King's Child"
- 2011 Energy 52 - "Café Del Mar"
- 2012 Conrad Schnitzler - "Zug" (with Max Loderbauer)
- 2012 The Orb Featuring Lee Scratch Perry - "Soulman" (with Max Loderbauer)
- 2013 Mari Kvien Brunvoll - "Everywhere You Go"
