= Tranceport 3 =

Compilation album (DJ mix album) by Sandra Collins
- Released: June 6, 2000
- Genre: Progressive trance; progressive house
- Length: 73:46
- Label: Kinetic
- Compiler: Sandra Collins

Sandra Collins chronology
Lost In Time (1997)	Tranceport 3 (2000)	Cream (2001)

Tranceport chronology
Tranceport 2 Dave Ralph (1999)	Tranceport 3 Sandra Collins (2000)	Transport 4 Max Graham (2001)

Professional ratings
Review scores
Source	Rating
Allmusic	4/5 stars

Tranceport 3 is a DJ mix album released by Sandra Collins in 2000, third in the Tranceport series. It was released on Kinetic Records.

== Track listing ==
1. "Liquid Sun (Cass & Slide Mix)" - Astral Projection
2. "F.U.B.A.R." - Think Tank
3. "Rush (Echo's Wave Dub)" - Bradley
4. "Desanitize" - Mara
5. "Boomerang (Original Mix)" - Dune
6. "Heaven (Feel An Extremity) (Chris Zippel Remix)" - Ultra Violet
7. "Deeper Inside (Original Mix)" - Deep Cover
8. "I'm Not Existing (O. Lieb Main Mix)" - LSG
9. "Motion" - Voyager
10. "C'est Muzique (Armin van Buuren Remix)" - Shane
11. "Airwave (Original Mix)" - Rank 1
