= Transport 4 =

Compilation album (Mixtape)
- Released: April 1, 2001
- Genre: Progressive house
- Label: Kinetic Records
- Compiler: Max Graham

Tranceport chronology
Tranceport 3 (2000)	Transport 4 (2001)	Transport 5 (2001)

Professional ratings
Review scores
Source	Rating
AllMusic	4/5 stars

Transport 4 is a mix album released by Max Graham in 2001. It was released on Kinetic Records.

Note the name change in the series from Tranceport to Transport.

== Track listing ==
=== Disc 1 ===
1. Deep Funk Project - "2 Heavy" (7:29)
2. Substructure - "Electronik" (7:34)
3. Boom! - "Boy Versus Girl (Peace Division Dub)" (4:38)
4. Ben Pound - "Turned" (4:51)
5. Greed - "Strange World (Blackwatch 'King Monkey Dub')" (5:53)
6. Sugarglider - "Slow Motion (Van Bellen Remix)" (8:16)
7. Mad Dogs - "Sudden Journey (Leon Alexander Remix)" (4:51)
8. Murph - "Dark Sympathy (Planet Heaven Remix)" (3:24)
9. Vernon - "Vernon's Wonderland (Hybrid's Matrix Dub)" (6:43)
10. Max Graham - "Tell You" (7:55)
11. Ogenki Clinic - "First Light" (10:05)

=== Disc 2 ===
1. Bladey - "The Nelson Effect (Original Mix)" (6:50)
2. Blackwatch - "Skin Deep (Gulf Of Tonkin Mix)" (5:51)
3. Sonic Infusion - "Reformatted" (5:34)
4. Max Graham - "Shoreline (Club Mix)" (7:17)
5. Tata Box Inhibitors - "Freet (Pascal F.E.O.S. Mix)" (4:42)
6. Timo Maas - "No Trance" (4:58)
7. Ayumi Hamasaki - "Vogue (Computerhell Vocal Mix)" (6:32)
8. Hybrid - "High Life (Live Version)" (6:50)
9. Underworld - "Kittens" (5:58)
10. Conjure One - "Redemption (Max Graham's Dead Sea Mix)" (9:57)
11. Private Taste - "First" (6:44)
