= Ubik (disambiguation) =

Ubik is a 1969 science fiction novel by Philip K. Dick.

Ubik may also refer to:

- "Ubik" (song), a 2000 single by Timo Maas
- Ubik (video game), a 1998 video game
- Ubik, Philippe Starck's industrial design company
- Ubik (band), Australian punk and punk rock band formed in 2016
