= Tranceport (album) =

Compilation album by Paul Oakenfold
- Released: 3 November 1998
- Genres: Progressive trance; trance; breakbeat
- Labels: Kinetic; Reprise; Perfecto
- Compiler: Paul Oakenfold

Paul Oakenfold chronology
Global Underground 007: New York (1998)	Tranceport (1998)	Resident. Two Years of Oakenfold at Cream. (1999)

Tranceport chronology
Tranceport (1998)	Tranceport 2 (1999)

Professional ratings
Review scores
Source	Rating
AllMusic	3/5 stars

Tranceport is a DJ mix album released by Paul Oakenfold in 1998. It was released on Kinetic Records.

In 2012, Rolling Stone ranked the album at number 23 on their list of "The 30 Greatest EDM Albums Ever".

== Track listing ==
1. The Dream Traveler – "Time" (Inertia’s Dream Mix) (7:17)
2. Three Drives On A Vinyl – "Greece 2000" (Original Mix) (6:44)
3. Tilt vs. Paul van Dyk – "Rendezvous" (Quadraphonic Mix) (4:08)
4. GusGus – "Purple" (Sasha vs. The Light) (7:16)
5. Ascension – "Someone" (Slacker and Original Vocal Mix) (8:12)
6. Agnelli & Nelson – "El Niño" (Matt Darey 12" Mix) (7:49)
7. Energy 52 – "Café Del Mar" (Three N One Remix) (7:21)
8. Binary Finary – "1998" (Original Mix / Paul Van Dyk Mix) (5:12)
9. Paul van Dyk featuring Toni Halliday – "Words (For Love)" (Original Mix) (5:08)
10. Lost Tribe – "Gamemaster" (Original Mix) (7:03)
11. Transa – "Enervate" (Original Mix) (7:11)
