= Music for the Maases =

Music For The Maases

Compilation album by Various artists
- Released: October 3, 2000
- Recorded: 2000
- Genre: Electronic, progressive trance
- Length: 1:31:30
- Label: Kinetic
- Producer: Timo Maas

Music for the Maases is an electronic compilation album mixed by German DJ Timo Maas, released on October 3, 2000.

== Track listing ==
Disc 1

1. Azzido Da Bass - "Dooms Night (Timo Maas Mix)" (6:14)
2. Muse - "Sunburn (Timo Maas Breakz Again Mix)" (4:06)
3. Mad Dogs - "Better Make Room (Original Mix)" (7:30)
4. Jan Driver - "Drive By (Timo Maas Mix)" (6:54)
5. Timo Maas feat. Digital City - "City Borealis" (8:29)
6. Kinetic A.T.O.M. - "Atom Noize" (5:48)
7. Timo Maas - "Riding on a Storm" (4:53)
8. Timo Maas - "Eclipse" (6:55)
9. Timo Maas - "Der Schieber" (6:17)
10. Green Velvet - "Flash (Timo Maas Mix)" (5:34)

Disc 2

1. Paganini Traxx - "Zoë (Timo Maas Mix)" (7:08)
2. Ian Wilkie vs. Timo Maas - "Twin Town (Original Mix)" (7:15)
3. Big Ron - "Let the Freak (Timo Maas Mix)" (6:17)
4. Timo Maas - "Schieber 1" (5:34)
5. Major North - "Annihilate (Timo Maas Mix)" (7:30)
6. Lustral feat. Tracy Akerman - "Everytime (Unreleased Vocal Timo Maas Mix)" (8:36)
7. [O] - "Fifteenth Letter of the Alphabet (Club Mix)" (6:10)
8. Poseidon - "Supertransonic (Timo Maas Mix)" (7:45)
9. Orinoko - "Mama Konda (Timo Maas Mix)" (6:17)
10. Orinoko - "Mama Konda (High On Kilimanjaro Mix)" (9:39)
