= Daníel Ágúst Haraldsson =

Icelandic singer and music producer (born 1969)

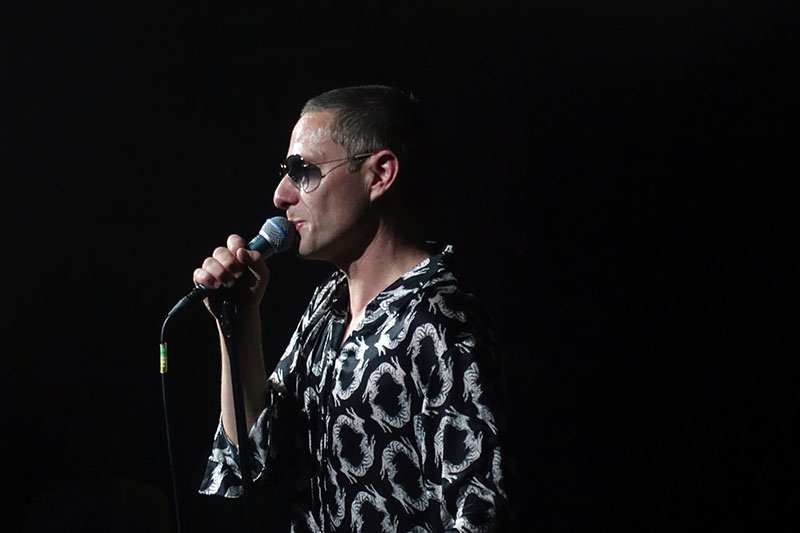
- Daníel Ágúst Haraldsson performing with GusGus in Aarhus, Denmark 2016

Background information
- Born: 26 August 1969 (age 57); Reykjavík, Iceland
- Genres: Electronic; house
- Occupations: Singer; producer
- Instrument: Vocals
- Labels: 4AD; Kompakt; One Little Indian
- Member of: GusGus; Nýdönsk; Esja
- Website: daniel.is

Daníel Ágúst Haraldsson (born 26 August 1969) is an Icelandic singer and producer. He is the lead singer of the bands GusGus, Nýdönsk, and Esja.

== Biography ==
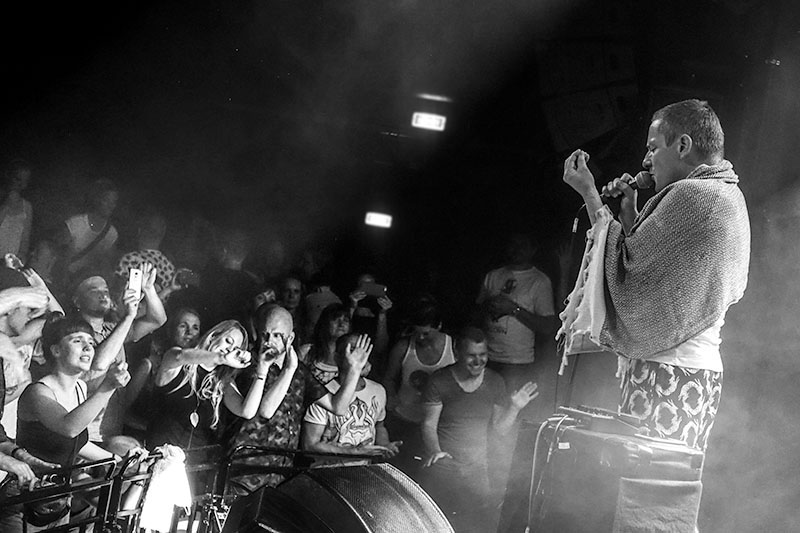
2016 in Aarhus, Denmark

Daníel has been part of the local and international music scene since he started his career with the Icelandic pop group Nýdönsk in 1987.

In 1989, he participated in the Eurovision Song Contest 1989 for Iceland with the song "Það sem enginn sér". He finished in 22nd place, scoring no points.

After releasing 5 albums with Nýdönsk, he produced an album with the electronic rock group Bubbleflies.

He then branched out into acting in the National and Municipal theatres, playing roles in West Side Story, Jesus Christ Superstar (Pontius Pilate), and Stone Free. Film directors Arni and Kinski approached him to play a lead role in their short film Nautn. During production, Daníel founded GusGus in 1995 with Kinski.

Daníel took a break from GusGus in the year 2000 to write music for both TV and documentary films and compose music for the Iceland Dance Company.

His first solo album, Swallowed a Star, was released by One Little Indian in Europe (2005) and North America (2006).

Daníel formed a musical pet project with heavy metal band Mínus front man Krummi Björgvinsson, called Esja, and released a self-titled album in 2008.

Daníel rejoined GusGus with the releases of Forever in 2007, 24/7 (2009), Arabian Horse (2011), and Mexico (2014), touring extensively in Europe. Daníel released his second solo album, The Drift, in 2011.

Preceded by Beathoven with "Þú og þeir (Sókrates)"	Iceland in the Eurovision Song Contest; 1989	Succeeded by Stjórnin with "Eitt lag enn"
