= Tranceport =

Trance music DJ mix album series

Tranceport is a trance music DJ mix album series. The series debuted in November 1998 with Paul Oakenfold's Tranceport, released on Kinetic Records. The album featured many trance songs that were receiving a lot of dance club play at the time, including Three Drives on a Vinyl's Greece 2000 and the Paul van Dyk remix of Binary Finary's popular 1998. Tranceport is widely regarded among electronic music listeners as one of the best trance albums ever released.

The later releases in the series were based on this template. DJs featured in this series included Dave Ralph and Quivver (Tranceport 2 and Transport 5, respectively). After Vol. 3, the series changed its name to Transport to better reflect the evolving popular club sounds and the incorporation of genres other than trance. There were 6 albums in the series, spanning 4 years. In 2003, the most popular trance started changing its sound from the tech-trance featured in the series to a much more epic sound being pushed by DJs like Armin van Buuren, thus lessening the series' popularity; it ended for good after Kinetic's demise in early 2004.

== Entries in the series ==
- 1998: Paul Oakenfold Tranceport
- 1999: Dave Ralph Tranceport 2
- 2000: Sandra Collins Tranceport 3
- 2001: Max Graham Transport 4
- 2001: Quivver Transport 5
- 2002: Trendroid Transport 6
