= To Get Down =

2001 single by Timo Maas

Single by Timo Maas

from the album Loud
- B-side: "To Get Down (Rock Thing)" (Timo's Dub Mix)
- Released: 2001
- Length: 3:32
- Label: Perfecto; Kinetic
- Songwriters: Timo Maas; Martin Buttrich; Malte Hagemeister; Phil Barnes
- Producers: Timo Maas; Martin Buttrich

Timo Maas singles chronology
"Killin' Me" (2001)	"To Get Down" (2001)	"Help Me" (2002)

"To Get Down" is a song performed by Timo Maas from his album Loud, featuring the vocals of Phil Barnes. It became a hit in the United Kingdom, peaking at No. 14 on the UK Singles Chart and topping the UK Dance and Indie charts. It also reached No. 4 on the US Billboard Hot Dance Club Play chart. The song is featured in the 2003 film The Italian Job, the 2003 video game Music 3000 and a remix by Fatboy Slim appears in the 2002 video game FIFA Football 2003.

== Track listing ==
UK CD

1. "To Get Down" (Radio Mix) - 3:32
2. "To Get Down" (Fatboy Slim Mix)
3. "To Get Down (Rock Thing)" (Timo's Dub Mix)

== Official versions ==
- "To Get Down" (Radio Mix) - 3:32
- "To Get Down" (Fatboy Slim Mix)
- "To Get Down (Rock Thing)" (Timo's Dub Mix)

== Charts ==
=== Weekly charts ===
Chart (2002)	Peak position
Australia (ARIA)	52
Australian Club Chart (ARIA)	2
Australian Dance (ARIA)	11
Belgium (Ultratip Bubbling Under Flanders)	4
Europe (Eurochart Hot 100)	70
Ireland (IRMA)	25
Netherlands (Single Top 100)	91
Scottish Singles Sales (Official Charts)	9
UK Singles (Official Charts)	14
UK Dance (Official Charts)	1
UK Independent (Official Charts)	1
US Dance Club Songs (Billboard)	4

=== Year-end charts ===
Chart (2002)	Position
Australian Club Chart (ARIA)	11
