= What the Dead Men Say =

What the Dead Men Say may refer to:

- What the Dead Men Say (album) by Trivium
- What the Dead Men Say (novella) by Philip K. Dick
