= Pictures (Timo Maas album) =

Studio album by Timo Maas
- Released: August 23, 2005
- Length: 53:58
- Label: Kinetic, Perfecto
- Producer: Timo Maas, Martin Buttrich

Timo Maas chronology
| Music for the Maases 2 (2003) | Pictures (2005) |

Pictures is an album by Timo Maas released in 2005. The second studio album of original tracks to be released by Maas, the tracks range from house to indie dance, with many of the tracks having a sinister feel. Brian Molko, lead singer of the band Placebo, appears on three tracks, including the single "First Day".

== Track listing ==
All tracks written by Martin Buttrich and Timo Maas unless stated:

1. "Slip in Electro Kid" – 3:13
2. "Pictures" (ft. Brian Molko) – 5:11 (written by Molko/Buttrich/Maas)
3. "First Day" (ft. Brian Molko) – 3:52 (written by Molko/Benson/Buttrich/Maas)
4. "High Drama" (ft. Neneh Cherry) – 7:21 (written by Benson/Hagemeister/Buttrich/Cherry/Maas)
5. "Enter My World" – 6:35
6. "4 Ur Ears" (ft. Kelis) – 5:34 (written by Rogers/Buttrich/Kaiser/Maas)
7. "Release" (ft. Rodney P) – 3:33 (written by Ramsey/Buttrich/Thornton/Panton/Maas)
8. "Big Chevy" – 5:15
9. "Devil Feel" (ft. Marc James and Anthony Tombling Jr.) – 3:53 (written by Francolini/Hagemeister/James Buttrich/Maas)
10. "Burn Out" – 1:58
11. "Like Siamese" (ft. Brian Molko) – 4:54 (written by Molko/Hagemeister/Buttrich/Maas)
12. "Haven't We Met Before" – 2:34

== Personnel ==
- Timo Maas - production, keyboards, drum programming
- Martin Buttrich - production, bass (3–7, 9), guitar (2, 3), piano (2), Rhodes electric piano (6), keyboards, drums

=== Vocalists ===
- Brian Molko (2, 3, 11) - guitar on track 3
- Jokate Benson (2, 3, 4)
- Neneh Cherry (4)
- Symphony of Voices (5)
- Kelis (6)
- Rodney P. (7)
- Anthony Tombling Jr. (9)
- Marc James (9)
- choir on track 9 arranged by Phil Barnes

=== Other personnel ===
- Sven Kaiser - orchestration (1, 2, 9, 12), Rhodes electric piano (2, 6)
- Martin Margot Gontarski - bass (2, 8, 10, 11)
- Dominik Decker - guitar (2, 6)
- Malte Hagemeister - guitar (4, 6, 9, 11)
- Ingo Schroder - guitar (5, 6)
- Richie Staringer - Rhodes electric piano (6)
- Lord Wax - scratches (6)
- Christian Decker - bass (11)
- Albrecht Husen - cymbal (11)

String section, tracks 1, 2, 9, and 12:

- Andrea Soldan, Sebastian Marock - viola
- Dana Anke, Katherina Kowalski, Katie Vitalie, Kirstieb Ibarra, Stefan Pintev - violin
- Boris Matchin, Yuri Christiansen Bertelsmann - cello
- Katherina C. Bunners - double bass

== Charts ==
Chart performance for Pictures
| Chart (2005) | Peak position |
|---|---|
| Australian Albums (ARIA) | 188 |
