= Tranceport 2 =

Compilation album (Mixtape)
- Released: September 1, 1999
- Genre: Trance
- Label: Kinetic Records
- Compiler: Dave Ralph

Tranceport chronology
Tranceport (1998)	Tranceport 2 (1999)	Tranceport 3 (2000)

Professional ratings
Review scores
Source	Rating
AllMusic	3/5 stars

Tranceport 2 is a mix album released by Dave Ralph in 1999, which was released on Kinetic Records.

== Track listing ==
=== Disc 1 - Departures ===
1. Sasha - Rabbitweed
2. Jam & Spoon - Stella (Nalin & Kane Mix)
3. Airtight - Sealed
4. Luke Slater - Love (12" Mix)
5. Tea Freaks - Arms Of Orion
6. Medway - The Baseline Track
7. Resistance D - Feel So High
8. Sasha - Belfunk
9. Andy Ling - Fixation

=== Disc 2 - Arrivals ===
1. Christian Smith & John Selway - Move!
2. Art of Trance - Madagascar (Ferry Corsten Mix)
3. Oliver Lieb - Subraumstimulation (John Johnson Mix)
4. X-Cabs - Infectious (Evolution Mix)
5. Fragma - Toca Me
6. DJ Eyal - Dreamcatcher (Tea Freaks Milk & Two Sugars Mix)
7. TR Junior - Rock With Me
8. Atlantis - Fiji
9. DJ Tandu - Velvet
