= Loud (Timo Maas album) =

2001 album by Timo Maas

Studio album by Timo Maas
- Released: 19 March 2002
- Recorded: 2001
- Genre: Electronic, house, breakbeat
- Label: Kinetic, Perfecto
- Producer: Timo Maas, Martin Buttrich

Timo Maas chronology
Connected – Perfecto Presents… Timo Maas (2001)	Loud (2002)	Music for the Maases 2 (2003)

Singles from Loud
- 1. "Ubik: The Breakz" Released: 2000; 2. "To Get Down" Released: 2002; 3. "Help Me" Released: 2002; 4. "Shifter" Released: 2002

Professional ratings
Aggregate scores
Source	Rating
Metacritic	71/100
Review scores
Source	Rating
AllMusic	4/5 stars
Alternative Press	3/5 stars
The A.V. Club	favourable
Blender	4/5 stars
Entertainment Weekly	B
The Guardian	4/5 stars
PopMatters	favourable
Q	4/5 stars
Release Magazine	7/10
Spin	6/10

Loud is the debut album by German DJ and producer Timo Maas, released in 2002. Maas had previously released albums of other performers' material which he remixed but Loud is his first studio album.

== Critical reception ==
John Bush of AllMusic gave the album four out of five stars but other reviews were more mixed. Lunar Magazine's Sean Meddel writes that Maas "gets it mostly right" but Entertainment.ie complains that, except for "Help Me", the album contains "far more perspiration than inspiration" and that the "result is a confusing mix of electronic genres that throws up a few exciting moments but largely fails to set the pulse racing".

== Commercial performance ==
In the United Kingdom, the album reached number 41 on the UK Albums Chart on 16 March 2002 and three singles from the album hit the UK Singles Chart that same year: "To Get Down" (No. 14), "Shifter" (No. 38), and "Help Me" (No. 65). In the United States, the album peaked at 47 on the Billboard Heatseekers Albums chart and seven on the Top Electronic Albums chart. Two songs from the album, "To Get Down" and "Shifter", hit the Billboard Hot Dance Club Play chart.

== Music ==
Several reviewers have noted a distinctive 1980s feel to the music on Loud. The first track, "Help Me", "a '50s sci-fi soundtrack with theremin and horns", features vocals by Kelis and also contains a sample of the title music from The Day the Earth Stood Still, composed by Bernard Hermann. Other guest performers on the album include MC Chickaboo, Martin Bettinghaus, and Finley Quaye.

== Track listing ==
- All tracks written by Maas/Buttrich, except where noted.
1. "Help Me" (featuring Kelis) (Maas/Buttrich/Rogers/Hermann)
2. "Manga"
3. "Hash Driven"
4. "Shifter" (featuring MC Chickaboo) (Maas/Buttrich/Green)
5. "Hard Life"
6. "That's How I've Been Dancin'" (featuring Martin Bettinghaus) (Maas/Buttrich/Bettinghaus)
7. "We Are Nothing" (Maas/Buttrich/Alexander)
8. "Old School Vibes"
9. "O.C.B."
10. "To Get Down" (Maas/Buttrich/Hagemeister/Barnes)
11. "Ubik: The Breakz" (featuring Martin Bettinghaus) (Maas/Buttrich/Bolleshon/Bettinghaus)
12. "Like Love"
13. "Caravan" (featuring Finley Quaye) (Maas/Buttrich/Quaye)
14. "Bad Days"

== Charts ==
Chart performance for Loud
Chart (2002)	Peak position
Australian Albums (ARIA)	68
Belgian Albums (Ultratop Flanders)	46
Dutch Albums (Album Top 100)	83
New Zealand Albums (RMNZ)	32
Swiss Albums (Schweizer Hitparade)	94
UK Albums (OCC)	41
