= Gus Gus vs. T-World =

Compilation album by GusGus
- Released: 24 April 2000
- Genre: Chill-out music
- Label: 4AD

GusGus chronology
This Is Normal (1999)	Gus Gus vs. T-World (2000)	Attention (2002)

Professional ratings
Review scores
Source	Rating
AllMusic	4/5 stars
The Encyclopedia of Popular Music	2/5 stars

Gus Gus Vs. T-World is an album by the Icelandic group Gus Gus, released in 2000 on 4AD Records.

The album is not strictly a Gus Gus recording but a collection of songs written by Biggi Veira and Herb Legowitz when they were called T-World.

== Critical reception ==
CMJ New Music Report praised the "sleek, instrumental grooves" and "melodic techno and downbeat serenading."

== Track listing ==
1. "Anthem" – 7:50
2. "Northern Lights" – 6:12
3. "Earl Grey" – 7:06
4. "Purple" – 9:20
5. "Rosenberg" – 6:27
6. "Sleepytime" – 4:39
7. "Esja" – 11:13

A different version of the track "Purple" is on the albums GusGus (1995) and Polydistortion (1997).

A shorter version of "Anthem" appears on the soundtrack to the movie Pi (1998).
