= Perfecto Presents: Sandra Collins =

Compilation album by Sandra Collins
- Released: September 23, 2003
- Genre: Progressive house; progressive trance
- Length: Approx. 144 minutes
- Label: Perfecto; Thrive

Sandra Collins chronology
Cream (2001)	Perfecto Presents: Sandra Collins (2003)	Perfecto Presents: Sandra Collins Part 2 (2006)

Perfecto Presents chronology
Perfecto Presents: Seb Fontaine (2003)	Perfecto Presents: Sandra Collins (2003)	Perfecto Presents: Great Wall (2003)

Professional ratings
Review scores
Source	Rating
AllMusic	4.5/5 stars
Resident Advisor	No Score
CMJ	No Score

Perfecto Presents: Sandra Collins is a mix album by DJ Sandra Collins, released 2003. It was released on the Thrive Records label. It was followed by Perfecto Presents: Sandra Collins Part 2.

== Track listing ==
Disc one

1. "Reshurc" - Junkie XL
2. "Atmosphere" - U&K
3. "Bubble Bath (Martin Accorsi Remix)" - Agent 001
4. "Reflections (Flash Brothers Remix)" - Rhythm Unlimited
5. "In This World (Slacker's Rain Before Carnival Remix)" - Moby
6. "It's Up To You (Lee Cabrera Unreleased Dub)" - Layo & Bushwacka!
7. "Flux" - Avedon
8. "No Other Man (The Greek's Remix)" - G-Pal Presents Ghos
9. "All In My Head (Planet Funk Remix)" - Kosheen
10. "Cosmic Fugue" - Voyager
11. "Cold Comfort (Attention Deficit's In Focus Dub)" - Curve
12. "Travelling On (Gabriel & Dresden Campfire Remix)" - Beber & Tamra

Disc two

1. "Intro" - Sandra Collins
2. "Phutures (Atmos Remix)" - Saiko-Pod
3. "Cliff (Infusion Remix)" - Will Saul
4. "Me & You (Humate Remix)" - Camouflage
5. "Losing My Religion (Humate Remix)" - Sydney
6. "Bass Trap" - Quest vs. The Dirty Fours
7. "Desire" - Rolasoul
8. "Spite" - Avedon and Stig
9. "Just Can't Get Enough (Infusion Remix)" - Transformer 2
10. "Spectacle" - Voyager
11. "The Great Escape (Attention Deficit's Freewill Remix)" - BT featuring Caroline Lavelle

== Personnel ==
- Sandra Collins - Mixing
