= Ubik =

1969 science-fiction novel by Philip K. Dick

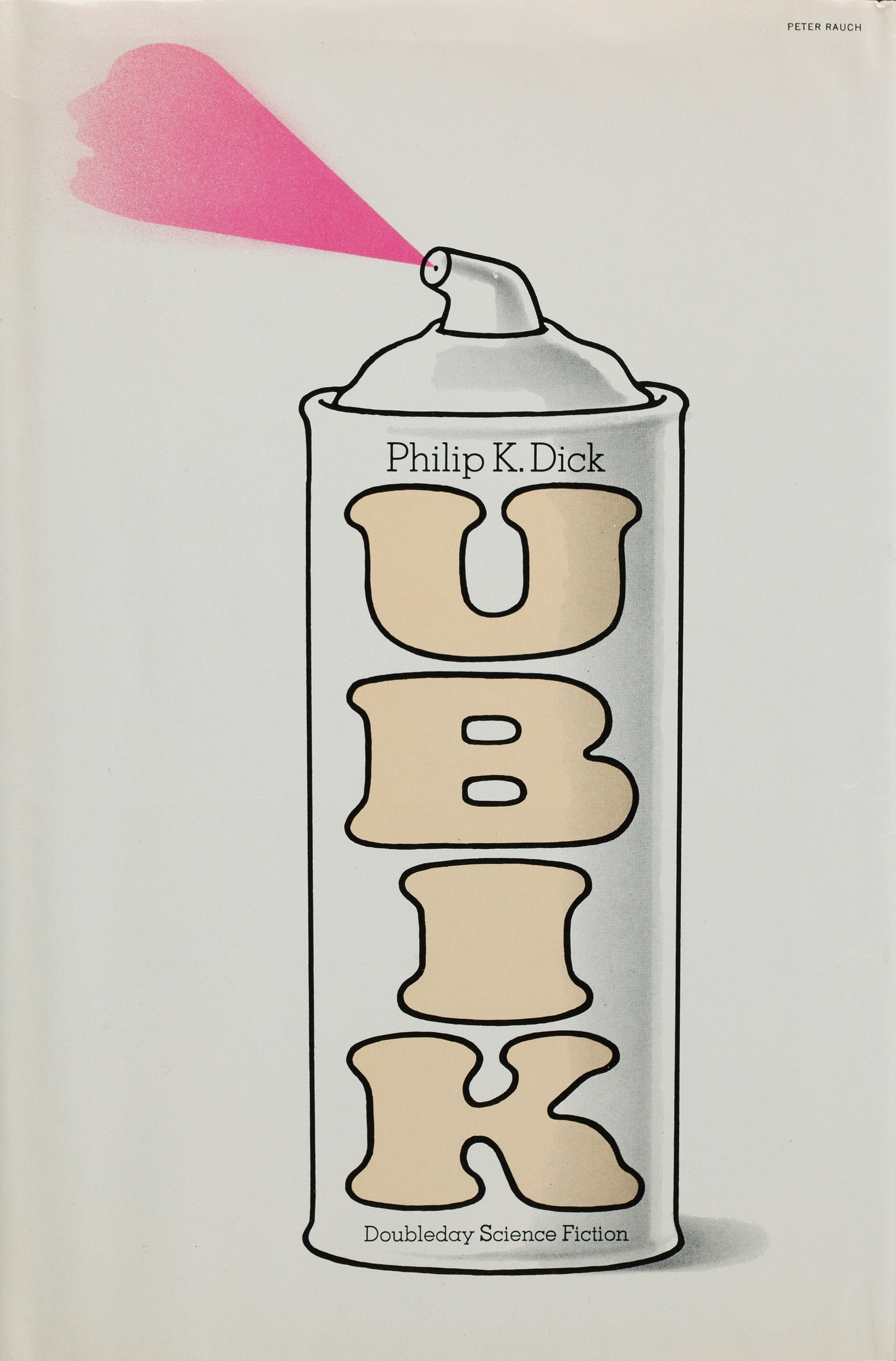
- Cover of first edition (hardcover)
- Author: Philip K. Dick
- Genre: Science fiction, paranoid fiction, philosophical fiction
- Publisher: Doubleday
- Publication date: 1969
- Publication place: United States
- Media type: Print (hardback & paperback)
- Pages: 202
- ISBN: 978-0-575-07921-2
- OCLC: 67871286

Ubik (/ˈjuːbɪk/ YOO-bik) is a 1969 science fiction novel by American writer Philip K. Dick. The story is set in a future 1992 where psychic powers are utilized in corporate espionage, while cryonic technology allows recently deceased people to be maintained in a lengthy state of hibernation. It follows Joe Chip, a technician at a psychic agency who begins to experience strange alterations in reality that can be temporarily reversed by a mysterious store-bought substance called Ubik. This work expands upon characters and concepts previously introduced in the vignette "What the Dead Men Say".

Ubik is one of Dick's most acclaimed novels. In 2009, it was chosen by Time magazine as one of the 100 greatest novels since 1923. In his review for Time, critic Lev Grossman described it as "a deeply unsettling existential horror story, a nightmare you'll never be sure you've woken up from".

== Plot ==
By the year 1992, humanity has colonized the Moon and psychic powers are common. The protagonist, Joe Chip, is a debt-ridden technician working for Runciter Associates, a "prudence organization" employing "inertials"—people with the ability to negate the powers of telepaths and "precogs"—to enforce the privacy of clients. The company is run by Glen Runciter, assisted by his deceased wife Ella who is kept in a state of "half-life", a form of cryonic suspension that allows the deceased limited consciousness and ability to communicate. While consulting with Ella, Runciter discovers that her consciousness is being invaded by another half-lifer named Jory Miller.

When business magnate Stanton Mick hires Runciter Associates to secure his lunar facilities from alleged psychic intrusion, Runciter assembles a team of 11 of his best inertials, including recent hire Pat Conley, a mysterious girl with the unique psychic ability to undo events by changing the past. Runciter and Chip travel with the group to Stanton's Moon base, where they discover that the assignment is a trap, presumably set by the company's main adversary, Ray Hollis, who leads an organization of psychics. A bomb blast apparently kills Runciter without significantly harming the others. They rush back to Earth to place him into half-life, but they cannot establish contact with him so his body is set to be buried.

From the moment of the explosion, the group begins to experience shifts in reality. Many objects they come into contact with (especially cigarettes) are much older than they should be, some being older types of the same object, and are rapidly deteriorating. They gradually find themselves moving into the past, eventually anchoring in 1939. At the same time, they find themselves surrounded by "manifestations" of Runciter; for example, his face appears on their money. As the novel progresses, members of the group one by one begin to feel tired and cold, then suddenly shrivel and die. Chip attempts to make sense of what is happening and discovers two contradictory messages from Runciter, one stating that he is alive and they are dead, and another claiming to have been recorded by him while he was still alive. The latter message advertises Ubik, a store-bought product which can be used to temporarily reverse deterioration and which often appears as a can of aerosol spray. Chip deduces that they may have all died in the blast and are now linked together in half-life, and unsuccessfully tries to get hold of Ubik.

After receiving another message and travelling to Runciter's hometown, Chip accuses Conley of working for Hollis and causing the deterioration with her ability, and while he himself is withering away, she confirms this. As she leaves him to die, he is saved by Runciter, who appears and sprays him with Ubik and tells him that the group is indeed in half-life and he himself is alive and trying to help them, although he does not know where Ubik comes from. After Runciter disappears, Jory reveals himself to Chip, telling him that he, not Conley, has now killed off the entire group (including Conley), as he "eats" half-lifers to sustain himself, and that the entire reality they are experiencing is created and maintained by him.

Fortunately, Chip is temporarily protected from being consumed through the effect of Ubik, and leaves Jory. As he at last begins to deteriorate again, he meets Ella, who saves him by granting him a certificate for a life-long supply of Ubik, and instructs him to stay half-alive and seek cans of Ubik to further assist Runciter after she herself reincarnates. She states that Jory's family pays the facility to keep his body near other half-lifers for him to consume in order to prolong his own half-life, and that entities like Jory can arise in any collection of half-lifers. Ubik is claimed to have been developed by Ella and several other half-lifers as a defense against Jory.

Each chapter is introduced by a commercial advertising Ubik as a different product serving a specific use. The last chapter is introduced by Ubik claiming that it has created and directed the universe, and that its real name is unknown and unspoken. In this short chapter, Runciter, who is in the "living" world mourning the loss of his best employees, discovers coins showing Chip's face, and feels that this is "just the beginning".

== Interpretation and analysis ==
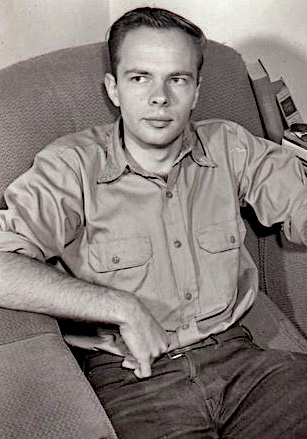
Author Philip K. Dick (pictured in 1963)

Dick's former wife Tessa remarked

Ubik is a metaphor for God. Ubik is all-powerful and all-knowing, and Ubik is everywhere. The spray can is only a form that Ubik takes to make it easy for people to understand it and use it. It is not the substance inside the can that helps them, but rather their faith in the promise that it will help them.

She also interpreted the ending by writing

Many readers have puzzled over the ending of Ubik, when Glen Runciter finds a Joe Chip coin in his pocket. What does it mean? Is Runciter dead? Are Joe Chip and the others alive? Actually, this is meant to tell you that we can't be sure of anything in the world that we call 'reality.' It is possible that they are all dead and in cold pac or that the half-life world can affect the full-life world. It is also possible that they are all alive and dreaming.

Peter Fitting sees parallels between the God-Devil/Life-Death relationship of Ubik and the antagonist's consumptive abilities within half-life, and the commercialized industry between psychics and psychic-inhibiting "inertials" which occupies the novel's "reality". Fitting also notes Dick's effort to desacralize and commercialize Ubik through the ironic advertising messages which begin each chapter.

== Adaptations and cultural influences ==
=== Video game ===
In 1998, Cryo Interactive Entertainment released Philip K. Dick's Ubik, a tactical action/strategy video game very loosely based on the book. The game allowed players to act as Joe Chip and train combat squads into missions against the Hollis Corporation. The game was available for PlayStation and for Microsoft Windows and was not a significant commercial success.

=== Planned film adaptations ===
==== Original attempt – Gorin ====
In 1974, French film-maker Jean-Pierre Gorin commissioned Dick to write a screenplay based on Ubik. Dick completed the screenplay within a month, but Gorin never filmed it. The screenplay was published as Ubik: The Screenplay in 1985 (ISBN 978-0911169065) and again in 2008 (ISBN 9781596061699). Dick's former wife Tessa claims that the published screenplay "has been heavily edited, and others have added material to the screenplay that Phil wrote", though she suggests that "film producers really ought to take a look at the author's own screenplay before embarking upon their journey of interpretation".

==== Dick's screenplay ====
Dick's screenplay features numerous scenes that are not in the novel. According to Tim Powers, a friend of Dick's and fellow science fiction writer, in his foreword to Ubik: The Screenplay, Dick had an idea for the film that involved "the film itself appearing to undergo a series of reversions: to black-and-white, then to the awkward jerkiness of very early movies, then to a crookedly jammed frame which proceeds to blacken, bubble and melt away, leaving only the white glare of the projection bulb, which in turn deteriorates to leave the theater in darkness, and might almost leave the moviegoer wondering what sort of dilapidated, antique jalopy he'll find his car-keys fitting when he goes outside".

==== Pallotta and Celluloid Dreams ====
Tommy Pallotta, who produced the film adaptation of Dick's novel A Scanner Darkly, said in an interview in July 2006 that he "still [had] the option for Ubik" and wanted to "make a live action feature from it". In 2007, Dick's daughter, Isa Dick Hackett, said that the film adaptation of Ubik was at an advanced stage of negotiations. In May 2008, the film was optioned by Celluloid Dreams, to be produced by Hengameh Panahi for Celluloid Dreams and Isa Dick Hackett for Electric Shepherd Productions. It was slated to enter production in early 2009, but never materialised.

==== Failed Gondry production ====
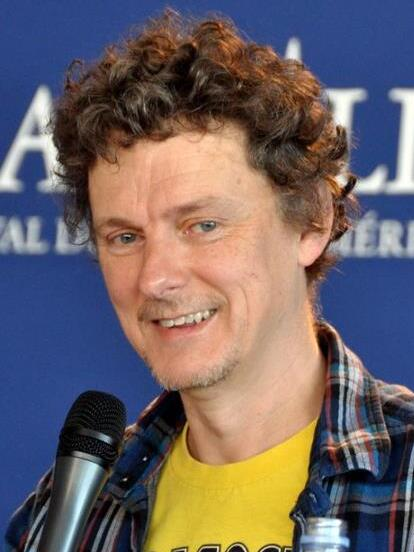
A planned film adaptation by Michel Gondry (pictured) was abandoned in the early 2010s.

Michel Gondry was working on a film adaptation in early 2011, with Steve Golin and Steve Zaillian producing. In 2014, however, Gondry told French outlet Telerama (via Jeux Actu) that he was no longer working on the project and explained:

"The book is brilliant, but it's good as a literary work. Having tried to adapt it with several screenwriters, ... at the moment I don't feel up to doing it. It doesn't have the dramatic structure that would make it a good film. I received a script that disheartened me a bit, and that was it. It was a dream, but in life you can't always have what you want."

=== Audiobook ===
An audiobook version of Ubik was released in 2008 by Blackstone Audio. The audiobook, read by Anthony Heald, is unabridged and runs approximately 7 hours over 6 CDs. Another version released in 2016 by Brilliance Audio, read by Luke Daniels, is unabridged and runs 7 hrs 56 minutes.

=== Music ===
Secret Chiefs 3 created an auditory adaptation on their "The Electromagnetic Azoth - Ubik / Ishraqiyun - Balance of the 19" 7" record. The "Ubik" track features musicians Trey Spruance (Faith No More, Mr. Bungle) and Bill Horist.

In 2000, Art Zoyd released a musical interpretation of the novel titled u.B.I.Q.U.e.. It is also the name of a Timo Maas single.

In 1992, Richard Pinhas released an album titled DWW featuring the tracks called "Ubik" and "The Joe Chip Song".

In 2006, C-Jeff started a chiptune net-label called Ubiktune.

In 2012, Cristian Vogel released The Inertials album named after characters from the novel.

== See also ==
- More Than Human
- Now Wait for Last Year
- Open Your Eyes
- Simulated reality
- The Circular Ruins
- "What the Dead Men Say"
