= Protoculture (disambiguation) =

Protoculture is the passing of learned behaviors from one generation to another in non-human primates

Protoculture may also refer to:

- A term used in the science fiction anime series The Super Dimension Fortress Macross, but referring to different things depending on the version:
  - In Macross: an ancient race of alien humanoids
  - In the American adaptation, Robotech: an ancient power source and foodstuff
- Protoculture Addicts, a North American anime and manga magazine
  - Protoculture Inc., publisher of the magazine
- "Proto Culture", a song by Del tha Funkee Homosapien, on the album Both Sides of the Brain
