= Arabian horse (disambiguation) =

The term "Arabian horse" may refer to:

- Arabian horse, a breed of horse originating from the Arabian Peninsula
- Arab (horse), a British Thoroughbred racehorse foaled in 1824
- Arabian Horse (album), a music album by GusGus

See also

- Part-Arabian, the general term for horses crossbred with Arabian lines
- Anglo-Arabian, a crossbred with Thoroughbred lines considered a separate breed in some nations
- Arabian Horse Association (AHA), a national organization in the United States that is the breed registry for Arabian horses
