= Cream (album) =

Compilation album by Sandra Collins
- Released: October 23, 2001
- Genre: Progressive house; tech house
- Length: Approx. 72 minutes
- Label: Kinetic

Sandra Collins chronology
Tranceport 3 (2000)	Cream (2001)	Perfecto Presents: Sandra Collins (2003)

Cream is a DJ mix album released by Sandra Collins, in 2001. It was released on the Kinetic Records label.

== Track listing ==
1. "Solid Ground (Markus Schulz Tribal Mix)" - Carissa Mondavi
2. "Robot Funk 2001 (Cimmera's Space at Amnesia Dub)" - Manhattan
3. "Momentum" - Lastmanstanding
4. "Warp" - 16th Element
5. "Chaos Engine" - Traveller & Quest
6. "My Mind Is Going" - Piece Process
7. "Derangement of the Senses" - Voyager
8. "Do You Hear It? (Bet Two For Good Mix)" - Chiller Twist
9. "All I Want (Mark O Tool Mix)" - JBN
10. "Fouk (Maurice & Noble's Fouked Up Union Mix)" - T-Empo
11. "Faith Delivers (Union Main Room Mix)" - Maurice & Noble featuring Jane Hadley

== Personnel ==
- Sandra Collins - Mixing
