= GusGus =

Icelandic electronic band

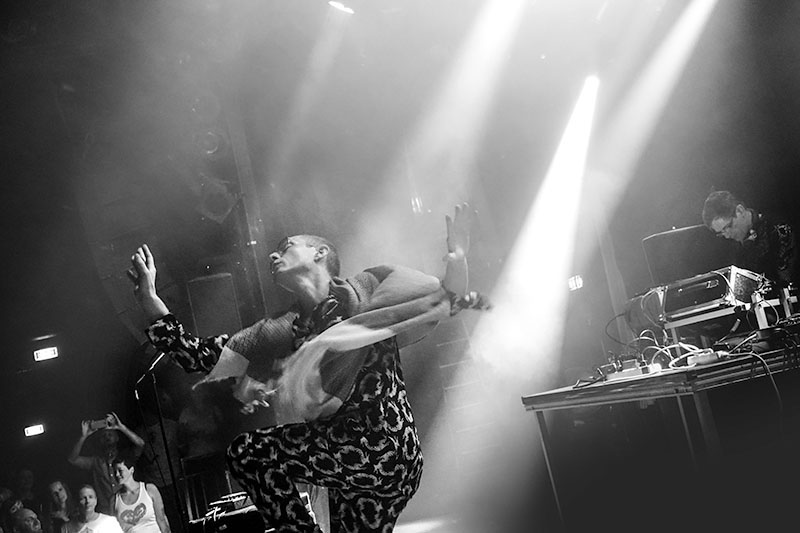
- GusGus performing in Aarhus, Denmark 2016

Background information
- Origin: Reykjavík, Iceland
- Genres: Techno; house; downtempo; ambient
- Years active: 1995–present
- Labels: OROOM; 4AD; Kompakt
- Members: Daníel Ágúst Haraldsson; Birgir Þórarinsson; Margrét Rán Magnúsdóttir
- Website: gusgus.com

GusGus is an Icelandic electronic music band from Reykjavík. Although initially a film and acting collective, the group is mostly known for its electronic music. The group's discography consists of twelve studio albums.

== History ==
GusGus was initially formed in 1995 as a film and acting collective. The band's name refers to a scene in the 1974 German melodrama film Ali: Fear Eats the Soul (German: Angst essen Seele auf) by Rainer Werner Fassbinder, in which a female character is cooking couscous for her lover, mispronouncing the food Gusgus.

GusGus' music is eclectic; although primarily classified as techno, trip hop, or house music, the band has experimented with other sounds. In the mid 2010s, they began to draw from synth-pop acts like Soft Cell, OMD, and Yazoo. They have remixed songs of popular artists such as Björk, Depeche Mode, Moloko, and Sigur Rós.

During its existence, GusGus has had as members:

- Daníel Ágúst Haraldsson
- Emilíana Torrini Davíðsdóttir
- Magnús Jónsson (aka Blake)
- Hafdís Huld Þrastardóttir
- Urður Hákonardóttir (aka Earth)
- Högni Egilsson
- Birgir Þórarinsson (aka Biggi Veira or Biggo)
- Magnús Guðmundsson (aka Maggi Lego, Herb Legowitz, Hunk of a Man, Buckmaster De La Cruz, The Fox, Fuckmaster, or Herr Legowitz)
- Stephan Stephensen (aka President Bongo, Alfred More, or President Penis)
- Sigurður Kjartansson (aka Siggi Kinski)
- Stefán Árni Þorgeirsson
- Baldur Stefánsson (Director of Financial Arts, aka DJ Tekno Jörgensen)
- Ragnheiður Axel
- Páll Garðarsson

In 1998, a remix of the track "Purple" appeared on Paul Oakenfold's trance compilation album Tranceport.

After the group's third album, This Is Normal (1999), the filmmaking arm of GusGus (Kjartansson and Árni Þorgeirsson) split off to form the production company Celebrator, now known as Arni & Kinski, which has produced advertisements and videos.

In January 2004, GusGus released the song "Desire" with Ian Brown.

As of early 2011, over 700,000 GusGus albums had been sold worldwide.

GusGus, as of 2015, consists of four members: President Bongo, Biggi Veira, Urður Hákonardóttir and Daníel Ágúst Haraldsson.

Some former GusGus members, such as Hafdís Huld, Blake, and Daníel Ágúst have pursued solo musical careers. Emilíana Torrini recorded a song for the soundtrack of Peter Jackson's 2002 film The Lord of the Rings: The Two Towers.

== Band members ==
1995	Daníel Ágúst Haraldsson; Emilíana Torrini Davíðsdóttir; Magnús Jónsson; Hafdís Huld Þrastardóttir; Birgir Þórarinsson; Magnús Guðmundsson; Sigurður Kjartansson; Stefán Árni Þorgeirsson; Baldur Stefánsson; Ragnheiður Axel; Páll Garðarsson
1996–2000	Daníel Ágúst Haraldsson; Magnús Jónsson; Hafdís Huld Þrastardóttir; Birgir Þórarinsson; Magnús Guðmundsson; Sigurður Kjartansson; Stefán Árni Þorgeirsson; Stephan Stephensen; Baldur Stefánsson
2001–2007	Urður Hákonardóttir; Birgir Þórarinsson; Stephan Stephensen; Magnús Guðmundsson
2008–2010	Daníel Ágúst Haraldsson; Birgir Þórarinsson; Stephan Stephensen
2011–2013	Daníel Ágúst Haraldsson; Högni Egilsson; Urður Hákonardóttir; Birgir Þórarinsson; Stephan Stephensen
2014–2016	Daníel Ágúst Haraldsson; Högni Egilsson; Birgir Þórarinsson
2016–2020	Daníel Ágúst Haraldsson; Birgir Þórarinsson
2021–present	Daníel Ágúst Haraldsson; Birgir Þórarinsson; Margrét Rán Magnúsdóttir

== Discography ==
=== Studio albums ===
List of studio albums, with selected chart positions
Title	Album details		Peak chart positions				
Title	Album details	ISL	AUS	FRA	GER	SWI	UK
Gus Gus	Released: 1995; Self-released	—	—	—	—	—	—
Polydistortion	Released: 7 April 1997; Label: 4AD	—	—	—	—	—	—
This Is Normal	Released: 26 April 1999; Label: 4AD	—	69	40	65	—	94
Gus Gus vs. T-World	Released: 24 April 2000; Label: 4AD	—	—	—	—	—	—
Attention	Released: 14 October 2002; Label: Moonshine / Underwater	—	—	—	—	—	
Forever	Released: 23 February 2007; Label: Pineapple	—	—	—	—	—	—
24/7	Released: 14 September 2009; Label: Kompakt	—	—	—	—	—	—
Arabian Horse	Released: 23 May 2011; Label: Kompakt	1	—	—	—	—	—
Mexico	Released: 23 June 2014; Label: Kompakt	—	—	—	62	82	—
Lies Are More Flexible	Released: 23 February 2018; Label: Oroom	—	—	—	—	—	—
Mobile Home	Released: 28 May 2021; Label: Oroom	11	—	—	—	—	—
DanceOrama	Released: 10 November 2023; Label: Oroom	8	—	—	—	—	—

=== Live albums ===
- Mixed Live at Sirkus, Reykjavik (2003)

=== Compilations ===
- 15 ára (2010)

=== EPs ===
- New Arrivals (2025)

=== Singles ===
- "Polyesterday" (1996) — UK No. 55 (as Purple EP: Polyesterday)
- "Believe" (1997) — UK No. 154
- "Standard Stuff for Drama" (1997)
- "Ladyshave" (1999) — UK No. 64, AUS No. 192
- "V.I.P." (1999) — UK No. 86
- "Starlovers" (1999) — UK No. 62, AUS No. 195
- "Dance You Down" (2002) — UK No. 141
- "Desire" (2002) — UK No. 95
- "David" (2003) — UK No. 52, AUS No. 106
- "Call of the Wild" (2003) — UK No. 75
- "Lust / Porn" (2005)
- "Need in Me" (2005) — BG No. 24
- "Forever Sampler" (2006)
- "Moss" (2007)
- "Hold You" (2007)
- "Add This Song" (2009)
- "Thin Ice" (2009)
- "Within You" (2011)
- "Over" (2011)
- "Deep Inside" (2011)
- "Crossfade" (2014)
- "Obnoxiously Sexual" (2014)
- "Mexico" (2014)
- "Airwaves" (2014)
- "Featherlight" (2017)
- "Don't Know How to Love" (2018)
- "Lifetime" (2019)
- "Out of Place" (2020)
- "Higher" feat Vök (2020)
- "Stay the Ride" (2021)
- "Our World" (2021)
- "Love is Alone" feat John Grant (2021)
- "Simple Tuesday" (2021)
- "Bolero EP" feat John Grant (2022)
- "Into the Strange" (2023)
- "Eða?" feat Birnir (2023)
- "When we Sing" (2023) — UA No. 55

== See also ==
- List of bands from Iceland
