= Mexico (GusGus album) =

Studio album by GusGus
- Released: 23 June 2014
- Recorded: 2013–2014
- Genre: Tech house, progressive house, electro house, downtempo
- Length: 49:45
- Label: Kompakt

GusGus chronology
Arabian Horse (2011)	Mexico (2014)

Professional ratings
Aggregate scores
Source	Rating
Metacritic	68/100
Review scores
Source	Rating
Allmusic	3.5/5 stars
Drowned In Sound	8/10 stars
The Guardian	3/5 stars
MusicOMH	3/5 stars
PopMatters	7/10

Mexico is the ninth studio album by the Icelandic electronic musicians GusGus, released on Kompakt label, following the successful album Arabian Horse. It contains nine tracks, one of which is instrumental. After several line-up changes, Mexico was produced by Stephan Stephensen (a.k.a. President Bongo) and Birgir Þórarinsson (a.k.a. Biggi Veira). Högni Egilsson of Hjaltalín, Daníel Ágúst Haraldsson and Urður Hákonardóttir made appearance as vocalists for this LP.

The album title Mexico is a metaphor of "going west", as humans always tend to go in a westerly direction. Daníel, who came up with this idea as a name for an album, felt very strongly it. Högni lately explained that "sometimes the things that stand out lay behind meaning and intellectuality" and that "It’s not necessarily something that we can describe in any way."

== Track listing ==
All songs written by GusGus.

No.	Title	Length
1.	"Obnoxiously Sexual"	5:07
2.	"Another Life"	5:35
3.	"Sustain"	5:21
4.	"Crossfade"	5:32
5.	"Airwaves"	5:53
6.	"God Application"	6:26
7.	"Not The First Time"	5:53
8.	"Mexico"	6:37
9.	"This Is What You Get When You Mess With Love"	3:21

== Chart positions ==
Chart performance for Mexico
Chart (2014)	Peak position
Belgian Albums (Ultratop Flanders)	111
Belgian Albums (Ultratop Wallonia)	100
German Albums (Offizielle Top 100)	62
Swiss Albums (Schweizer Hitparade)	82
