= This Is Normal =

Studio album by GusGus
- Released: 27 April 1999
- Genre: Electronica; house; trip hop
- Length: 53:35
- Label: 4AD
- Producer: GusGus; Páll Borg; Alfred More

GusGus chronology
| Polydistortion (1997) | This Is Normal (1999) | Gus Gus vs. T-World (2000) |

Singles from This Is Normal
- 1. "Ladyshave" Released: 1 March 1999; 2. "Starlovers" Released: 12 April 1999; 3. "V.I.P." Released: 23 August 1999

This Is Normal is the third studio album by Icelandic electronic music band GusGus. It was released on 27 April 1999 through 4AD.

== Reception ==
Professional ratings
Review scores
| Source | Rating |
|---|---|
| AllMusic | 4/5 stars |
| Entertainment Weekly | B+ |
| The Guardian | 3/5 stars |
| Melody Maker | 4.5/5 stars |
| Muzik | 4/5 stars |
| NME | 6/10 |
| Q | 3/5 stars |
| Spin | 8/10 |

AllMusic called This Is Normal "a fine blend of accessibility and invention".

== Track listing ==
| No. | Title | Length |
|---|---|---|
| 1. | "Ladyshave" | 3:57 |
| 2. | "Teenage Sensation" | 4:14 |
| 3. | "Starlovers" | 4:43 |
| 4. | "Superhuman" | 6:20 |
| 5. | "Very Important People" | 5:51 |
| 6. | "Bambi" | 3:47 |
| 7. | "Snoozer" | 4:01 |
| 8. | "Blue Mug" | 4:11 |
| 9. | "Acid Milk" | 6:43 |
| 10. | "Love vs. Hate" | 4:33 |
| 11. | "Dominique" | 5:15 |

== Charts ==
| Chart (1999) | Peak position |
|---|---|
| Australian Albums (ARIA Charts) | 69 |
| United Kingdom (OCC) | 94 |
