= Attention (GusGus album) =

Studio album by GusGus
- Released: September 2002
- Genres: Techno, house
- Length: 55:24
- Labels: Moonshine; Underwater

GusGus chronology
Gus Gus vs. T-World (2000)	Attention (2002)	Forever (2007)

Professional ratings
Review scores
Source	Rating
AllMusic	4/5 stars
The Encyclopedia of Popular Music	3/5 stars
Slant	3.5/5 stars

Attention is a studio album by GusGus, released in 2002. The band recorded the album as a quartet.

The album peaked at #19 on Billboard's Top Dance/Electronic Albums chart.

== Critical reception ==
PopMatters wrote that the album "continues in the GusGus tradition of decent, thinking-man's dance music ... Attention fuses their signature style with an electro-pop/'80s vibe." Wired wrote: "Stocked with cathedral-ready incantations from new vocalist Earth (a.k.a. Urdur Hakonardottir), old-school rave references, and seductive techno and house rhythms, Attention grabs you by the hips and doesn't stop shaking." The Washington Post wrote that "the emphasis tilts toward steady beats, fuzztone bleeps and earthy vocals."

== Track listing ==
All songs written by GusGus.

No.	Title	Length
1.	"Unnecessary"	4:33
2.	"David"	4:31
3.	"Desire"	5:08
4.	"Attention"	5:07
5.	"Dance You Down"	6:05
6.	"I.I.E."	5:28
7.	"Call of the Wild"	8:20
8.	"Detention"	2:33
9.	"Your Moves are Mine"	5:45
10.	"Don't Hide What You Feel"	7:54
