= Ubik (video game) =

1998 video game

- Cover art
- Developer: Cryo Interactive
- Publisher: Cryo Interactive
- Designer: Jean-Luc Sala
- Programmers: Stéphane Maruejouls; Frédéric Brutin; Miguel Goncalves
- Writer: Johan Robson
- Composer: Eric Los
- Platforms: PlayStation, Windows
- Release: 1998
- Genres: Action, Strategy
- Mode: Single-player

Ubik is a 1998 video game by Cryo Interactive, based on the novel Ubik by Philip K. Dick.

== Plot ==
In the year 2019, Joe Chip is working for Runciter Associates in Los Angeles, where he is tasked with preventing enemy companies from spying on his clients.

== Gameplay ==
The player has to lead, train and equip a team of five combatants (including Joe Chip) and complete missions in 3D-rendered maps. Though the backgrounds are prerendered, players can choose from a limited number of different camera angles for each scene. Shooting is a key aspect of the gameplay. The missions include killing all enemies, rescuing hostages and stealing corporate secrets.

== Production ==
The developers thought long and hard about how to translate Dick's work into a video game. Fans of the time associated him with the world of the Blade Runner movie, so the team felt compelled to stick to this. However, they wanted to avoid a wholly science fiction route and instead stay somewhat true to the book. They thought that Dick's 1960s description of the future was more in the tone of Starsky & Hutch, whereas they wanted to update this with a Blade Runner or Total Recall dark cynicism. The PlayStation conversion was difficult due to the hardware not supporting z-buffering.

== Critical reception ==
John Saavedra of Den Of Geek thought the convoluted plot wasn't suitable for a strategy game. Brutoom of Hardcore Gaming 101 thought that the game merged different genres together, and pushed creative boundaries.
