= Dooms Night =

1999 single by Azzido Da Bass

Single by Azzido Da Bass
- Released: 1999
- Genre: Progressive trance (club mix); electro house (Timo Maas remix); UK garage (revisited)
- Label: Club Tools
- Songwriters: Azzido Da Bass; Stevo Wilcken
- Producers: Azzido Da Bass; Stevo Wilcken

Azzido Da Bass singles chronology
"Dooms Night" (1999)	"Speed (Can You Feel It?)" (2002)

"Dooms Night" is the debut single by German DJ and producer Azzido Da Bass, first released in 1999 in Germany. In the UK, the song missed the top 40 until a remix of the song by Timo Maas was released as a single on 9 October 2000; it was this version which gave the song mainstream chart success, reaching number eight on the UK Singles Chart.

The Timo Maas remix contains a sample from "How Do You Plead?" by French duo Soofle. Later, a re-work of the Timo Maas version by English duo Stanton Warriors was also released as a single in 2000, entitled "Dooms Night (Revisited)". Their remix featured updated UK garage-esque beats and vocals by UK ragga MC Slarta John.

Due to the song's popularity, it also made major appearances around the world, including at the MTV Music Awards in 2000, in several American and European commercials, and in the film soundtrack to Be.Angeled. In 2008, various releases of "Dooms Night" featured new remixes by artists such as Laidback Luke, Crookers, Switch, Meck and Lexy & K-Paul.

== Reception ==
In the liner notes of the Kiss mix album Kiss House Nation 2001, Mixmag music editor Matthew Kershaw named the Maas remix among 2000's "uncategorisable" club tracks. He called it "the most surprising, eccentric, adaptable clubland tune of the year" and highlighting its "wub wub wub" hook. In The Village Voice, Simon Reynolds described the remix as Maas' "scene-crossing smash of 2000". He had earlier described it as "a dance record that everybody liked. A tune that was massive in all sorts of divergent and seemingly incompatible scenes. A track that simultaneously worked as a rave anthem, a club classic, an underground monster, a mainstream chart smash. Impossible, you say, no way not in this post-rave era of micro-scenes, niche markets and endless genre subdivision." He highlighted its appeal in the trance, progressive, big beat, urban, 2-step garage scenes and its popularity at Notting Hill Carnival and Berlin's Love Parade.

== Track listings ==
1999 German 12-inch single – "Dooms Night"

A. "Dooms Night" (club mix)
B. "Dooms Night" (dub mix)

1999 German 12-inch single – "Dooms Night" Remixes

A1. "Dooms Night" (DJ JamX & De Leon's DuMonde rmx) – 7:37
A2. "Dooms Night" (Azzido Da Bass real club mix) – 6:38
B1. "Dooms Night" (Timo Maas remix) – 6:16
B2. "Dooms Night" (Da Hardstylaz remix) – 6:26

2000 12-inch single - "Dooms Night"

A1. "Dooms Night" (Timo Maas remix) – 5:53
B1. "Dooms Night" (Pascal F.E.O.S. Treatment mix) – 6:17

2000 12-inch single - "Dooms Night" (revisited)

A1. "Dooms Night" (Stanton Warriors vocal mix) – 5:53
B1. "Dooms Night" (Stanton Warriors dub) – 6:17
B2. "Dooms Night" (Norman Jay's Dooms Day club edit) – 6:21

UK CD single 1

1. "Dooms Night" (Timo Maas radio edit) – 3:45
2. "Dooms Night" (Dooms Night club mix) – 6:21
3. "Dooms Night" (DJ Jam X & De Leon's DuMonde short rmx) – 7:17

UK CD single 2

1. "Dooms Night" (Timo Maas radio edit) – 3:45
2. "Dooms Night" (Pascal F.E.O.S. Treatment mix) – 6:50
3. "Dooms Night" (Norman Jay's Doomsday mix) – 8:09

German CD maxi

1. "Dooms Night" (Timo Maas radio edit) – 3:45
2. "Dooms Night" (Stanton Warriors radio edit) – 3:36
3. "Dooms Night" (Timo Maas remix) – 6:16
4. "Dooms Night" (Pascal F.E.O.S. Treatment mix) – 6:50
5. "Dooms Night" (Stanton Warriors main mix) – 5:40
6. "Dooms Night" (Norman Jay's Doomsday club edit) – 3:21
7. "Dooms Night" (Stanton Warriors dub edit) – 5:49

Enhanced CD maxi

1. "Dooms Night" (Timo Maas radio edit) – 3:45
2. "Dooms Night" (Stanton Warriors radio edit) – 3:36
3. "Dooms Night" (Timo Maas remix) – 6:16
4. "Dooms Night" (Stanton Warriors main mix) – 5:40
5. "Dooms Night" (Stanton Warriors vocal mix) – 5:53
6. "Dooms Night" (Stanton Warriors dub) – 6:17
7. "Dooms Night" (Norman Jay's Doomsday mix) – 8:09
8. "Dooms Night" (club mix) – 6:21
9. "Dooms Night" (DJ Jam X & De Leon's DuMonde short remix) – 7:17
10. "Dooms Night" (Pascal F.E.O.S. Treatment mix) – 6:50
11. "Dooms Night" (the video)

== Charts ==
Chart (2000–2001)	Peak position
Austria (Ö3 Austria Top 40)	42
Belgium Dance (Ultratop Flanders)	17
Belgium Dance (Ultratop Wallonia)	17
Canada Dance/Urban (RPM)	3
Europe (Eurochart Hot 100)	41
Germany (GfK)	43
Ireland (IRMA)	37
Netherlands (Dutch Top 40 Tipparade)	20
Netherlands (Single Top 100)	100
Scottish Singles Sales (Official Charts)	25
Switzerland (Schweizer Hitparade)	25
UK Singles (Official Charts)	8
UK Dance (Official Charts)	1
UK Indie (Official Charts)	3
