= Arabian Horse (album) =

Studio album by GusGus
- Released: 23 May 2011
- Recorded: 2009–2011
- Genre: Tech house, progressive house, techno
- Length: 59:30
- Label: Kompakt

GusGus chronology
24/7 (2009)	Arabian Horse (2011)	Mexico (2014)

Professional ratings
Review scores
Source	Rating
Allmusic	4/5 stars
MusicOMH	4/5 stars

Arabian Horse is the eighth studio album by GusGus, released in 2011. It has the same line-up as the previous album, 24/7: Stephan Stephensen(aka President Bongo), Biggi Veira and Daníel Ágúst Haraldsson, and the return of Urður "Earth" Hákonardóttir and guest spots from Högni Egilsson of Hjaltalin and Davíð Þór Jónsson. The artist Wojtek Kwiatkowski, created the cover art used in the photograph.

== Track listing ==
All songs written by GusGus.

No.	Title	Length
1.	"Selfoss"	5:43
2.	"Be With Me"	5:10
3.	"Deep Inside"	4:48
4.	"Over"	5:54
5.	"Within You"	5:39
6.	"Arabian Horse"	6:04
7.	"Magnified Love"	4:54
8.	"Changes Come"	7:33
9.	"When Your Lover’s Gone"	5:24
10.	"Benched"	8:20

== Chart positions ==
Chart (2011)	Peak position
Icelandic Albums (Tónlistinn)	1
Belgian Heatseeker Albums (Ultratop Flanders)	7

== Certifications ==
Region	Certification	Certified units/sales
Iceland (FHF)	Gold	5,000
