= Polydistortion =

Studio album by GusGus
- Released: 7 April 1997
- Recorded: 1995–1997
- Genre: Electronica; techno
- Length: 61:02
- Label: 4AD
- Producer: GusGus; Páll Borg

GusGus chronology
GusGus (1995)	Polydistortion (1997)	This Is Normal (1999)

Singles from Polydistortion
- 1. "Polyesterday" Released: 7 October 1996; 2. "Believe" Released: 10 February 1997; 3. "Polyesterday" Released: 9 February 1998 (reissue); 4. "Barry" Released: April 1998 (promo only)

Professional ratings
Review scores
Source	Rating
AllMusic	4.5/5 stars
Muzik	9/10
NME	8/10
Pitchfork	8.3/10
Q	4/5 stars

Polydistortion is the second studio album by Icelandic electronic music band GusGus. The album was released on 7 April 1997 on 4AD, serving as their first release on the label. The songs "Why?" and the band's cover of Slowblow's "Is Jesus Your Pal?" feature Emilíana Torrini on vocals. Most of the material on the album had previously been released independently, as the album GusGus in 1995.

As of March 1999, the album has sold 40,000 copies in United States and worldwide sales stand at over 150,000 copies.

== Track listing ==
No.	Title	Writer(s)	Length
1.	"Oh" (Edit)	Daníel Ágúst; Herb Legowitz; Arthur Lyman	1:17
2.	"Gun"	Ágúst	6:08
3.	"Believe"	Ágúst; Páll Gardarsson; Siggi Kjartansson; Robert "Kool" Bell; Ronald Bell; Donald Boyce; Robert "Spike" Mickens; Claydes Charles Smith; Dennis Thomas; Rick Westfield	7:18
4.	"Polyesterday"	Ágúst	4:52
5.	"Barry"	Ágúst; Magnús Jonsson	5:58
6.	"Cold Breath '79"	Gardarsson; Kjartansson	6:43
7.	"Why?"	Jonsson	4:04
8.	"Remembrance"	Jonsson	8:07
9.	"Is Jesus Your Pal?"	Slowblow	3:34
10.	"Purple"	Legowitz; Birgir "Biggi" Thorarinsson; Ian Wright; Peter Coyle; Stephen Cummerson	8:02
11.	"Polybackwards" (hidden track)	(unlisted)	5:01

Limited edition bonus disc
No.	Title	Length
1.	"Cold Breath '79" (Husmix)	5:02
2.	"Believe" (16B Remix)	7:23
3.	"Believe" (LFO Remix)	5:11
4.	"Polydistortion"	8:06
