= What the Dead Men Say (novella) =

Short story by Philip K. Dick

What the Dead Men Say is a science fiction novella by American writer Philip K. Dick, first published in Worlds of Tomorrow magazine in June 1964. The manuscript, originally titled "Man With a Broken Match", was received by Dick's agent on 15 April 1963.

The concept of "half-life" introduced in the story was used again and developed in Dick's 1969 novel Ubik, which even re-uses a page of the novella verbatim.

== Plot summary ==
Louis Sarapis, a highly influential businessman, dies of an embolism. After a prolonged funeral, his public relations manager, Johnny Barefoot, delivers his corpse to a mortuary to partially revive him into a state called "half-life". The process would allow Louis to regain consciousness for a total of about one year (portioned out over a longer time frame), although his mental processes would still gradually fade until his final death. Half-life is considered a routine process, with burial thought of as "barbaric". Louis' will orders for him to be put into half-life as soon as possible, likely so he can participate in the Democratic-Republican National Convention; he previously attempted to elect Alfonse Gam, failing only narrowly. However, the revival process appears to fail; although Louis' brain is active, no communication can be established. At the same time, staff at a radio telescope on the Moon detects a transmission of human speech coming from one light-week away.

Louis' economic assets are inherited by his granddaughter, Kathy Egmont Sharp. Claude St. Cyr, the businessman's former lawyer, considers her unfit to manage the assets, given her history of drug abuse and general eccentricity. The next morning, she meets Johnny, who is now her employee. When Kathy hears about the mysterious transmission, she starts to suspect it's from Louis; further, she insists that she can communicate with him mentally. Meanwhile, Gam receives a telegram purportedly from Louis, declaring his intent to support Gam at the Convention once again. He requests legal help from Louis' former lawyer, Claude St. Cyr, who is confused by the situation.

The transmission has since gotten more powerful, starting to interfere with telecommunications. St. Cyr finds that the voice resembles Louis', causing him to start believing Kathy and Gam's assertions. When he and Phil Harvey offer her the moon Ganymede for her assets, she claims that her grandfather "says no". As they discuss, a phone in the office rings; Johnny picks it up, hearing the voice of Louis. Johnny threatens to quit if Kathy doesn't sell, to which she responds: "My grandfather says go ahead and quit." When he returns to his hotel room, Louis communicates with him again, first through Johnny's phone, then through the TV network. Johnny considers jumping out through the window, which Louis communicates to St. Cyr and Harvey by taking over the automated newsletter. Kathy was contacted too and arrives first. Louis insists that Johnny represent Gam, who figures Louis' newfound influence over the media will allow him to get elected.

Louis' influence spreads further, taking over even disconnected devices such as electric typewriters. At the same time, his speech becomes more and more incoherent, devolving to: "Vote for Gam, the man what am. Gam, Gam, vote for Gam, vote for Gam, the one fine man[...]". St. Cyr retrieves Louis' corpse and burns it, but the transmission doesn't stop. He deduces that the source of the voice is Kathy, perhaps in some sort of subconscious process. Johnny rushes to the hospital where she's recovering from an overdose. She confirms St. Cyr's theory, claiming to have "eaten" Louis. Johnny determines that the initial voice came from an artificial transmitter, deployed years ago as part of a plan to terrorize the public and get Gam elected. St. Cyr later concludes that there must be another transmitter closer to Earth, given the voice's quick reaction time. Johnny is selected to assassinate Kathy and now-nominated Gam.
