= Forever (GusGus album) =

Studio album by GusGus
- Released: 23 February 2007
- Length: 73:36 [special edition – 124:46]
- Label: Pineapple

GusGus chronology
Attention (2002)	Forever (2007)	24/7 (2009)

Forever is the sixth studio album by GusGus, released February 23rd, 2007 in the UK, March 1st in Iceland, February 26th in the rest of Europe and in April in North America. A limited edition release of the album also includes with a disc of bonus tracks with B-sides and remixes, and an interview. In the Icelandic charts, which is based on sales data, Forever peaked in the third place.

Forever received positive reviews from critics. Trausti Júlíusson of Fréttablaðið gave it five stars and stated that it is a "great dance music album that just works from the first beat to the last. A highlight of GusGus´s career." Ben Hogwood of MusicOMH gave it four stars and stated that it "is a superbly vital and energizing album", although "the album goes on a bit too long".

== Track listing ==
No.	Title	Length
1.	"Degeneration"	4:13
2.	"You’ll Never Change"	4:54
3.	"Hold You"	7:25
4.	"Need In Me"	7:41
5.	"Lust"	5:04
6.	"If You Don't Jump (You're English)"	6:36
7.	"Forever"	4:04
8.	"Sweet Smoke"	4:09
9.	"Porn"	5:44
10.	"Demo 54"	7:07
11.	"Moss"	7:18
12.	"Mallflowers"	9:21

- "Mallflowers", "Need in Me", "Lust", "Porn" and "Demo 54", are reworked, and, in some cases (such as "Need In Me"), virtually rewritten versions of songs that have appeared on previous EPs.
- The liner notes credit Mr. Scruff for influence on the song "Sweet Smoke". Mr. Scruff also has a song called "Sweet Smoke" on his album Trouser Jazz.

=== Bonus disc ===
No.	Title	Length
1.	"Hold You (Hermigervil's RMX)"	5:52
2.	"He's So Hot"	5:08
3.	"Lust (Live in Vienna)"	10:53
4.	"Moss (Tim Deluxe Remix)"	9:21
5.	"Need in Detroit"	4:04
6.	"Need in Me (President's Wildpitz edit"	6:28
7.	"Moss (Greg Churchill RMX)"	6:54
8.	"GUSGUS Late Night (Interview)"	2:30
