= 24/7 (GusGus album) =

Studio album by GusGus
- Released: 14 September 2009
- Recorded: 2008–2009
- Genres: Minimal techno, house
- Length: 52:17
- Label: Kompakt

GusGus chronology
Forever (2007)	24/7 (2009)	Arabian Horse (2011)

Professional ratings
Review scores
Source	Rating
Drowned In Sound	8/10 stars
Pitchfork Media	(6.9/10)
PopMatters	6/10 stars
The Phoenix	4/4 stars

24/7 is the title of the seventh studio album by GusGus. The album was released on 14 September 2009 by the German label Kompakt, which had delayed the record from its originally announced release date of 6 July 2009. The first single was "Add This Song", released on 22 June 2009, with remixes from Lopazz & Zarook, Gluteus Maximus, Patrick Chardronnet and Klovn. Beginning on 4 September 2009, a full album leak started spreading on various Internet blogs and forums. On 19 October 2009, "Thin Ice" was released as the second single.

== Track listing ==
No.	Title	Length
1.	"Thin Ice"	8:24
2.	"Hateful"	9:37
3.	"On The Job"	10:50
4.	"Take Me Baby" (feat. Jimi Tenor)	3:58
5.	"Bremen Cowboys"	7:52
6.	"Add This Song"	11:36

== Singles ==
Single	Release date
Add This Song	22 June 2009
Thin Ice	19 October 2009
