= Azzido Da Bass =

German musician

- Also known as: Aceto Da Bassamico, Azzido Ba Bass
- Born: Ingo Martens; 29 August 1971 (age 54)
- Genres: Breakbeat; house; garage
- Occupations: DJ, producer
- Years active: 1996–present

Azzido Da Bass (born Ingo Martens; 29 August 1971) is a German DJ and record producer based in Hamburg.

== Early life ==
Over the years, Martens was influenced by a wide range of music genres: as a youth, he first became interested in hip hop and break dance; by the mid-1980s, he began collecting electronic and synthpop albums from groups such as Depeche Mode, Kraftwerk and Nitzer Ebb; a few years later, it was acid house and hardcore groups. In the early 1990s, Carl Cox gave Martens a cassette tape of various remixes, which had a substantial impact of Martens' view on music, paving the way for his future career.

== Career history ==
=== DJ performances ===
Further inspired by the performances of local and international DJs on tour, Martens began his own DJ career in 1996 under the name Azzido Da Bass. One year later, he would secure his first professional job in Hamburg, Germany. The performance was a success, opening the door to additional jobs in northern Germany performing in clubs, competitive events and private parties, and within four years, Da Bass was a significant player within the German techno music scene, with tours both domestically and internationally.

=== Record producer ===
Da Bass aspired to create his own original music after several years as a DJ. After meeting producer/songwriter Stevo Wilcken in 1998, Da Bass made the transition to record producer. The duo co-wrote their first original song "Dooms Night", which was released in 1999 at the Love Parade in Berlin. Although the song did well in Germany, it languished outside the top 40 of the UK Singles Chart until a remix of the song was released by Timo Maas in 2000. The remix's popularity sent the track to No. 8 on the UK charts. Soon after, the song made major appearances around the world, including at the MTV Music Awards in 2000, several American and European commercials, and in the movie soundtrack to Angeled.

Da Bass and Wilcken continued to produce a mixture of original songs and remixes thereafter, including a remix of the song "House of God" by Dimensional Holofonic Sound and their next hit "Speed (Can You Feel It?)" in 2002. The track peaked at No. 68 on the UK Singles Chart.

In 2005, Da Bass founded the independent record label Luscious Sound. His goal was to allow music artists to create their material with a minimal amount of interference from above.

== Discography ==
=== Singles ===
- 1999/2000: "Dooms Night" - UK #8, IRE #37, SWI #25, AUT #42, GER #43
- 2002: "Speed (Can You Feel It?)" - UK #68
- 2005: "Knightz of the Living Bassheadz"
- 2005: "Strobelightz"
- 2006: "Lonely by Your Side"
- 2007: "So Wrong"
- 2009: "I Want U"
- 2010: "Music for Bagpipes"
- 2010: "They're Killin It" (Malente vs Azzido Da Bass)
- 2011: "Dooms Day"
- 2011: "We Love Hamburg"
- 2011: "Hunting" (Malente vs Azzido Da Bass)
