= Greece 2000 =

Single by Three Drives
- Released: 25 November 1997
- Genre: Progressive trance
- Length: 8:03
- Label: Massive Drive Recordings
- Songwriters: Erik de Koning, Ton van Empel
- Producer: Three Drives

Three Drives singles chronology
"Greece 2000" (1997)	"Turkey 2000" (1998)

"Greece 2000" is a song by Dutch progressive trance duo Three Drives. It peaked at number 12 in the United Kingdom and number one on the UK Dance chart.

== Track listing ==
12" maxi-single (1997)

1. "Greece 2000" – 8:03
2. "Not Overdrive" – 7:06
3. "Piano Freq." – 6:10

Whitenoise Remix (2019)

1. "Greece 2000" (Whitenoise extended remix) – 4:13

== Charts ==
Chart performance for "Greece 2000"
Chart (1997–1999)	Peak position
Australia (ARIA)	81
Netherlands (Single Top 100)	66
Scotland Singles (OCC)	12
UK Singles (OCC)	12
UK Dance (OCC)	1

2008 chart performance for "Greece 2000"
Chart (2008)	Peak position
Spain (PROMUSICAE)	8

2026 chart performance for "Greece 2000"
Chart (2026)	Peak position
US Dance Digital Song Sales (Billboard) Max Styler rework	14
