= Sandra Collins =

American DJ and record producer

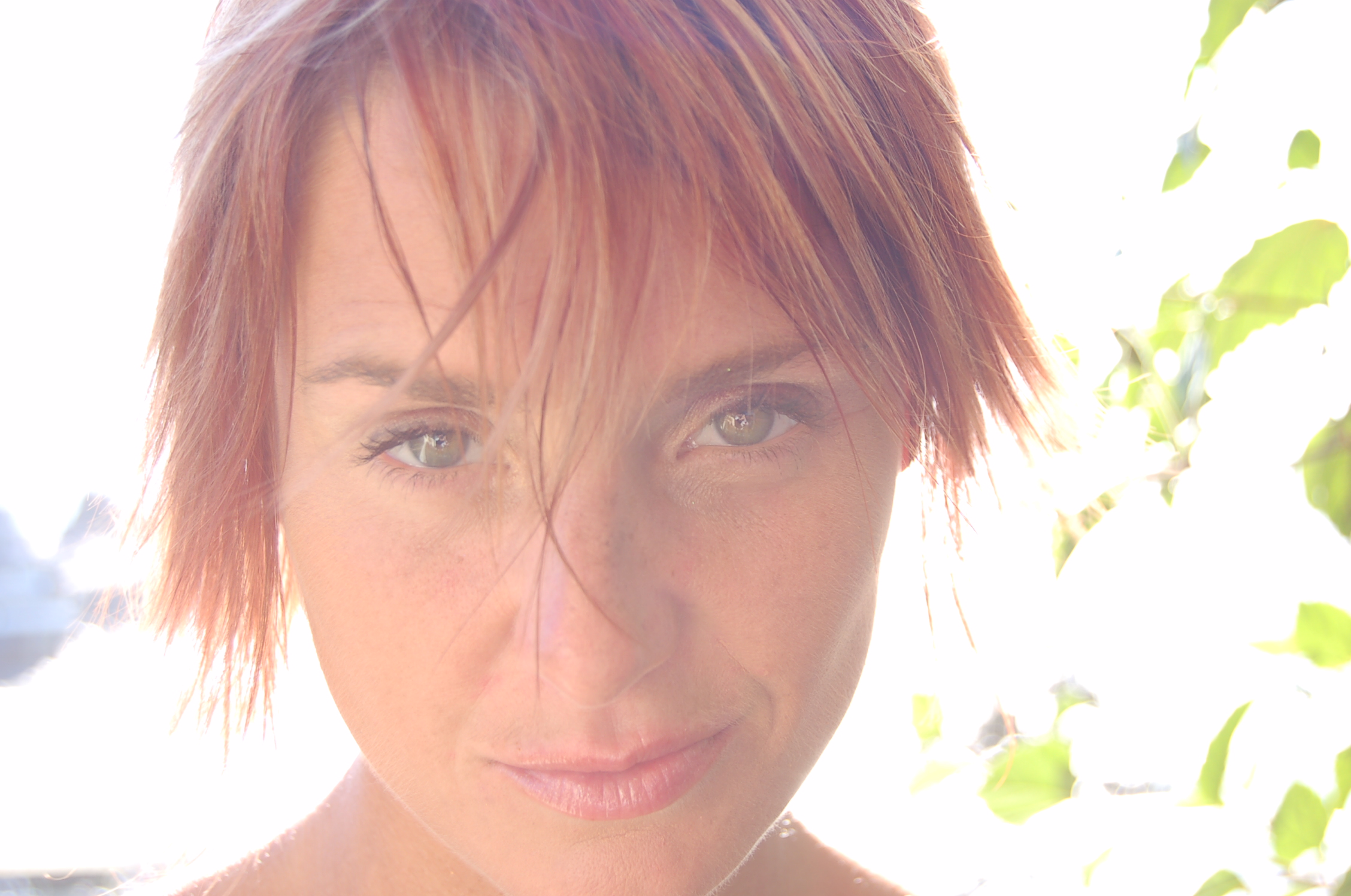
- Portrait of DJ Sandra Collins

Background information
- Born: Las Vegas, Nevada, U.S.
- Origin: Los Angeles, California, U.S.
- Genres: Electronic, techno, trance, progressive house
- Occupations: Disc jockey, Musician, Record producer, Remixer
- Instruments: Turntable, sampler
- Years active: 1989–present
- Labels: Kinetic Records; Perfecto Records; Thrive Records; Juno Records

Sandra Collins is an American musician, DJ, record producer, and remixer.

== Biography ==
Sandra Collins is an American DJ, record producer, and remixer known for her pioneering role in the evolution of trance and progressive house music in the United States. Widely regarded as one of the first female DJs to achieve mainstream success in electronic dance music, Collins helped break gender barriers in a male-dominated industry through her high-profile performances and influential mix releases.

Born in Arizona and raised in Las Vegas, Collins began DJing in the late 1980s and was deeply influenced by Detroit techno, acid house, and new beat. She became a fixture in the California rave scene after relocating to Los Angeles in 1992, where she contributed not only as a DJ but also through art installations, go-go dancing, and publishing a rave zine called Rave Magazine.

Notable releases include Tranceport 3 (2000), Cream (2001), and Perfecto Presents: Sandra Collins (2003, 2006). Collins performed for over 80,000 attendees at Woodstock '99. and was the first female DJ featured in the influential Tranceport recording series. She has released two CD mixes under Paul Oakenfold's Perfecto label.

Her touring career spans major festivals such as Ultra Music Festival, Electric Daisy Carnival, Global Gathering, Creamfields, and Burning Man. In 2005, Collins launched SV2 Presents: Interference with visual artist Vello Virkhaus, a touring audio-visual show featuring over 40 original animated video pieces remixed live using the Pioneer DVJ-X1 turntables. The project was sponsored by Pioneer Pro DJ and Edirol and earned a cover feature in DJ Times Magazine.

Collins has received multiple accolades, including URB Magazine’s Best Female Artist (1999) and Dancestar UK’s Best DJ (2003). Her remix credits include artists such as Nine Inch Nails, Fleet Foxes, and PJ Stroller.

Sandra Collins starred in Girl, a feature-length documentary directed by Kandeyce Jorden, which explores the lives and careers of female DJs in the EDM scene. The film includes interviews, behind-the-scenes footage, and live performances.

In recent years, her style has evolved to include deep house, melodic techno, and vocal performance. She continues to produce music with DC-based collaborator Micke and is developing a radio show and scoring projects for film.

== Discography ==
Albums / Mix Compilations
Year	Title	Label
1997	Lost In Time	Fragrant Music
2000	Tranceport 3	Kinetic Records
2001	Cream	Kinetic Records
2003	Perfecto Presents: Sandra Collins	Perfecto Records
2006	Perfecto Presents: Sandra Collins Part 2	Perfecto Records
2008	Bringing the Heat	Thrive Records
2010	Soundbar: Live in Chicago	System Recordings
2013	Live at Burning Man	Independent
2015	WMC Sessions	DJ Mag Sessions
2018	Progressiva	Le Poisson Rouge
2022	Deep Frequency	Independent / Bandcamp
2024	Interference Re:Imagined	Independent (with Micke)

Singles / EPs
Year	Title	Label
1998	Ode to Our / Red	Fragrant Music
1999	Flutterby	Hook Recordings
2017	I Like It	Independent
2017	Insane	Independent
2018	Four	Independent
2018	Sleepless Nights	Independent
2019	Nineteen Birds	Independent
2019	Seven	Independent
2021	Zero Logic Redux (with Micke)	BEAT Music Fund
2022	Seven (Remixes) (with Micke)	Stripped Recordings
2023	Deep Frequency	Independent / Bandcamp

Also Appears On
Year	Title
1999	Hardesertrance 2
1999	Global Underground: Budapest
1999	Fragrant Sense
1999	Dual
1999	Bedrock
2000	Digital Empire: DJ Girl
2001	Trance Atlantic Communication, Volume 1
2001	Reactivate, Volume 14 (Unmixed)
2002	Exposure, Volume 1
2003	Perfecto Presents: Great Wall
2004	Creamfields: Mixed Live
2006	Perfecto Presents: Sandra Collins Part 2
2013	Girl (Original Soundtrack)
2018	Progressiva Live at LPR
2022	Burning Man Archives Vol. 3

== See also ==
- List of HFStival acts
