= Dave Ralph =

British electronic musician

Dave Ralph is an English electronic musician, best known as a house and trance DJ.

== Biography ==
Ralph was born in Liverpool and first deejayed in the 1970s. Through the 1980s he performed at clubs such as Cream and Shelley's, and began working with Paul Oakenfold, releasing recordings on his Perfecto label. Ralph opened for Oakenfold on his 1996 world tour, and released his first major-market mix in 1999 on Kinetic Records. He worked frequently in U.S. clubs after moving to The United States in 2000, most noticeably Webster Hall in New York City, as well as Avalon and Royale in Boston. Dave currently resides in California where he heads up the curation of Insomniac's international EDC festivals.

== Discography ==
- Tranceport 2 (Kinetic Records, 1999)
- Ministry Presents...Trance Atlantic (Ministry of Sound, Issue #18, July 1999)
- Love Parade (Kinetic, 2000)
- Naturalized (Kinetic, 2001)
- Resident Alien (System Records, 2003)
