= Timo Maas =

German DJ/producer and remixer (born 1969)

- Born: July 27, 1969 (age 57); Bückeburg, West Germany
- Genres: House, techno, progressive house, breakbeat, UK garage
- Occupations: DJ, music producer, remixer
- Years active: 1992–present
- Labels: Rockets & Ponies; Virgin; My Favorite Robot; Kinetic; Perfecto

Timo Maas (born July 27, 1969) is a German DJ/producer and remixer. His remix of Azzido Da Bass's single "Dooms Night" helped launch his career in 2000.

In its wake, he also released Music for the Maases Volume 1, a mix album consisting of many of his previous tracks and remixes. After another mix album called Connected for Paul Oakenfold's imprint Perfecto, Maas released his own debut studio album Loud in 2002. The album was produced by German dance music producer Martin Buttrich (also known for his work with Loco Dice), and featured guest appearances from Kelis, Neneh Cherry and Placebo's Brian Molko.

In a career spanning over 30 years, Maas has been collaborated with and remixed many artists such as Paul McCartney, Depeche Mode, Finley Quaye, Fatboy Slim, Garbage, Jamiroquai, Madonna, Moby, Moloko, Muse, Roger Sanchez and Tori Amos. In 2016, Maas and his producing partner James Teej, received a Grammy nomination (the second in Maas's career) for their work on Paul McCartney & Wings' track "Nineteen Hundred and Eighty-Five".

In 2008, Maas launched his own record label called Rockets & Ponies releasing productions from artists such as Wolfgang Haffner, Ricardo Villalobos, Maetrik, Nightmares on Wax and Addison Groove.

In addition to his productions, Maas has been a longtime DJ, having been a resident at the legendary Ibiza nightclub DC10 for over 15 years and having also played in clubs such as Ushuaia, The End, Twilo, Tresor, Tunnel and many more.

== Career ==
=== Early years (1982–1998) ===
Maas bought his first set of turntables at the age of 17, and played his very first DJ set in 1982 at a party in his friend's home. The beginning of his career consisted mostly of gigs around Germany playing "top 40" records with the occasional techno record sneaked in, but it was to be another 6 years from his debut DJ performance before he would perform his first official all-techno set. In 1992, Maas was introduced to the early German rave scene, and he went on to DJ at many different rave events both in Germany and elsewhere, earning a name in the electronic underground scene.

Maas' first record, "The Final XS", was released in 1995. His second record release, "Die Herdplatte", was a collaboration with another producer, Gary D, which was a bigger success than his first. Gary D also gained Maas a residency at Hamburg's famous club The Tunnel, between 1994 and 1996. Through his British contact Leon Alexander, Maas played at the Bristol club Lakota and held a residency there for three years. Maas also began to release records through record labels such as Hope Recordings, both under his own name and the alias, Orinoko, arguably the biggest record of which was titled "Mama Konda". The track received wide support from DJs including Sasha, Carl Cox and Morales and reached the top 20 in both the UK and US charts. Maas has also recorded under many aliases such as Mad Dogs among others together with his manager and friend Leon Alexander. In 2000, Maas began a residency alongside Deep Dish at the New York City club, Twilo.

=== "Doom's Night", Loud and Pictures (1999–2005) ===
A turning point in Maas's career was remixing Azzido Da Bass's 1999 single "Doom's Night". Co-remixed with Martin Buttrich in a 3-hour session after Azzido Da Bass rejected their first attempt, it reached No. 8 on the UK Singles Chart and sold over half a million copies worldwide. Following that, Maas decided to release a compilation CD containing only tracks produced or remixed by him, titled Music for the Maases, and having the remix of "Doom's Night" as its opening track. The compilation also features a remix for Muse's "Sunburn" and has said to have been put together with the American audiences in mind.

In 2001, Maas and Buttrich started working on Maas's debut album, which saw its release in 2002 on Paul Oakenfold's label Perfecto, and was titled Loud. It was generally well-received, averaging at 71 (out of 100) on Metacritic. The first track, "Help Me", features vocals by Kelis and also contains a sample of the title music from The Day the Earth Stood Still, composed by Bernard Hermann. The album features other guest performers such as MC Chickaboo, Martin Bettinghaus, and Finley Quaye. The 10th track on the album, "To Get Down", has been used in several film soundtracks and other mediums such as the 2003 remake of The Italian Job, Riders (now known as Steal) in 2002, a Budweiser beer commercial and the FIFA 2003 video game. Maas has described his debut album as forward-thinking, bridging the gap between electronic and mainstream music: "It's not just about bringing dance music to a wider audience. I see the whole thing as something very open-minded. You hope alternative rock and dance can come together, and I think it's going to be really good."

Maas and Buttrich continued to do remix work, most notably remixing Tori Amos' track "Don't Make Me Come to Vegas", off her 2003 album Scarlet's Walk.

The track was nominated for the 2004 Grammy Awards in the non-classical remixed recording category. The same year, Maas also remixed the Depeche Mode track "Enjoy the Silence".

In 2005, Maas released his second studio album, titled Pictures on Warner Bros.. It was co-produced with Martin Buttrich over a two-year period in their studio in Hannover. The album featured many artist collaborations such as Kelis, Neneh Cherry and Placebo lead singer Brian Molko.

=== Balance compilation, residency at DC10 and Lifer (2005–2013) ===
Over the coming years after their 2005 LP Pictures, Timo Maas and Martin Buttrich continued to work together on various projects, but ultimately the pair's musical direction went amicably in different directions. Maas met his next production partner Santos in 2007 at a gig in Rome. Together they formed a new alias called Mutant Clan, under which they proceeded to release several releases, as well as put together a double CD compilation for the acclaimed Balance Mix Series in 2010. The pair worked on sourcing the tracks, recording special edits and track-listing for four months. The same year, Maas also started his label, originally in partnership with Santos, called 'Rockets & Ponies", which received support from the likes of Ricardo Villalobos, Carl Cox and Tiesto. 2013 saw the release of Timo's third artist album, titled Lifer, on his Rockets & Ponies imprint. True to Maas's manner, it featured cameos from different artists such as Katie Cruel, James Lavelle of Unkle and a return by Maas's longtime friend Brian Molko. For Lavelle, this was the only vocal outside of Unkle that he had ever done. On working with Katie Cruel, Maas claimed to have been touched by the soul and emotion of her voice. Of the album and working Santos, Maas has said: "I really like working with Santos, as we both inspire each other a lot and we are trying to push boundaries on a constant basis. The album 'Lifer' is one of the results of this vibe."

Over the next few years, Timo proceeded to release more singles. Following the release of his track "Dancing for My Pleasure" on the Canadian electronic music label My Favorite Robot, Timo proceeded to do a mix for their compilation series titled ‘Crossing Wires 002’ containing mostly unreleased material from other producers., The release was followed by a North-American tour by the same name in 2014. The same year, Timo was commissioned to do a remix for Morcheeba’s "Make Believer" followed by a collaborative remix work on Róisín Murphy’s "Jealousy" with one-third of My Favorite Robot, James Teej, in 2015. Maas and Teej continued their collaborative partnership with a release on Crosstown Rebels' sub-label Rebellion called ‘Thingzz’.

Aside from his release-work, Timo has also been a resident at the legendary Ibiza nightclub DC10 (nightclub), having played his first show there in 2001. Maas has said that it is the only club in the world where he can be himself and express his vision and he has called it the most original and unique experience one can have when going to the island.

=== "Nineteen Hundred and Eighty-Five" (2016–present) ===
In 2009 Maas and his agent, David Levy, had a listening session in Ibiza playing each other different tracks that they liked. Timo heard the original Paul McCartney and Wings track played to him by Levy and expressed his wish to get the stems for the track. David Levy, through his connections to McCartney's management, delivered the studio session, complete with all the stems, to Maas. Over the proceeding few months, Maas tried working on the stems with different people after a while the project went back on the shelf. It was only a few years later when Maas played the unfinished work to his good friend and My Favorite Robot label head James Teej that the pair felt they could do something with it. The duo spent a week listening to different parts and working intensely on the track until it was finished. The track was sent to McCartney's team from whom it got the approval for release.

What followed was a marketing strategy generated by Maas's management that saw the vinyl being released as an unknown white label with only Paul McCartney's face stamped on it on the Phonica Records website. The vinyl-run was limited and sold out in a few hours, having its prices soar to upwards $400 on eBay and other websites and going #1 on Phonica Records’ website. There was some speculation whether the vinyl was officially sanctioned by McCartney himself, but it eventually got conclusive proof on its origins. The story of its overnight success got quickly picked up by major publications such as i-D, Billboard, NME, Rolling Stone Germany, and Clash Magazine.

The track was positively received and played by many industry heavyweights such as Pete Tong, Annie Mac, Seth Troxler and Damian Lazarus. The inspiration behind the remix was to come up with a modern take of a classic song with respect to the original, with more emphasis on the bass and reinforcing McCartney's blues-inspired vocals.

The record got its official release on Virgin in June 2016, followed by a remix package featuring versions from Paul Woolford, Kerri Chandler and Tim Green.

The official video features clips of McCartney performing the original track in the 1970s, as well as two young dancers performing an intricate choreography interpreting the lyrics and theme of the song. The video was directed by London-based Can Evgin and choreographer by Aaron Sillis, noted for his work with FKA Twigs and MIA.

In December 2016, it was announced that Maas's and Teej's remix had been nominated at the 59th Grammy Awards in the best remix category.

== Influences ==
Maas has cited early 1980s music with a lot of funk, soul and disco as well as Jean Michel Jarre and his albums Oxygène, Equinoxe, and Magnetic Fields as early influences on him.

He has also claimed to be influenced by James Lavelle and is a fan of old-school rock such as Led Zeppelin and Dire Straits as well as newer rock musicians such as Lenny Kravitz.

== Discography ==
=== Albums ===
List of albums, with selected chart positions
Title	Year	Peak chart positions	
Title	Year	AUS	UK
Loud	2002	68	41
Pictures	2005	188	—
Lifer	2013	—	—

=== Compilations and DJ mixes ===
- DJ Mix Vol.2 (Perfecto CDr)
- XFade Master Mix Vol. 4: Hope Recordings (1999)
- Music for the Maases (2000)
- Connected – Perfecto Presents… Timo Maas (2001)
- Music for the Maases 2 (2003)
- Don't Look Back (2005)
- Born to Funk (2005)
- Return of the Legend (2009)
- Balance 17 (2010)

=== Singles ===
List of singles, with selected chart positions
Title	Year	Peak chart positions		Album
Title	Year	AUS	UK	Album
"The Final XS"	1995	—	—	Non-album singles
"Die Herdplatte"	1995	—	—	Non-album singles
"M.A.A.S.M.E.L.L.O.W."	1998	—	—	Non-album singles
"Twin Town"	1999	—	—	Non-album singles
"Ubik" (featuring Martin Bettinghaus)	2000	—	33	Loud
"Der Schieber"	2000	—	50	Non-album singles
"Connected"	2001	—	—	Non-album singles
"Killin' Me"	2001	—	—	Non-album singles
"To Get Down"	2001	52	14	Loud
"Shifter" (featuring MC Chickaboo)	2002	122	38	Loud
"Help Me" (featuring Kelis)	2002	—	65	Loud
"Unite"	2003	—	—	Non-album single
"First Day" (featuring Brian Molko)	2005	68	51	Pictures
"Pictures" (featuring Brian Molko)	2005	—	65	Pictures
"Dancing for My Pleasure"	2013	—	—	Non-album single
"Articulation"	2013	—	—	Lifer
"College 84"	2013	—	—	Lifer
"Pop a Bubble"	2013	—	—	Non-album single
"Tantra"	2013	—	—	Lifer

=== Selected remixes ===
- Azzido Da Bass – "Dooms Night"
- Roger Sanchez featuring Sharleen Spiteri – "Nothing 2 Prove"
- Depeche Mode – "Enjoy the Silence 04", "Personal Jesus"
- Fatboy Slim – "Star 69"
- Garbage – "Breaking Up the Girl"
- Jamiroquai – "Feels Just Like It Should"
- Kelis – "Young, Fresh n' New"
- Madonna – "Don't Tell Me"
- Moby – "We Are All Made of Stars"
- Muse – "Sunburn"
- Novy & Eniac – "Pumpin'"
- Moloko – "Familiar Feeling"
- Placebo – "Special K"
- Tori Amos – "Don't Make Me Come to Vegas"
- Tim Green – "Monomania" (2013)
- Katie Cruel – "City City" (2013)
- Microbots – "Cosmic Evolution" (2013)
- James Teej – "Liking Your Disorder" (2013)
- Johnny Mikes, Michael B – "Darkness Everyday" (2013)
- Santos – "Pump It Up – Timo Maas Dub" (2013)
- Santos – "Pump It Up – Timo Maas Vocal" (2013)
- Kramnik – "Mongolium" (2012)
- Lambda – "New York" (2012)
- Green Court – "Follow Me" (2012)
- Green Velvet – "Flash" (2011)
- Green Velvet – "Flash – Dirty Dub Mix" (2011)
- Infected Mushroom – "Smashing the Opponent" (2009)
- Paganini Traxx – "Zoe" (2009)
- Behrouz, Andy Chatterley – "Lost in Translation" (2009)
- Starecase – "See" (2002)
- Haktan ONal – "Subfreakie" (2002)
- BT – "Never Gonna Come Back Down" (2001)
- Jamie Anderson – "Expressions" (1998)

== Appearances in media ==
Maas's track "To Get Down" has been widely used in movie soundtracks such as the 2003 remake of The Italian Job, Riders (now known as Steal) in 2002, as well as other mediums such as the video game FIFA Football 2003, and a Budweiser beer commercial. Another of his tracks, "Unite", appears in the FIFA 2004 soundtrack. A remix of the "Neighbourhood" screen music is credited to him on the video game The Sims 2: Nightlife, whilst the video game Wipeout Fusion uses the song "Old School Vibes" from the album Loud. Burnout Revenge used the General Midi remix of "First Day" for the game's EA Trax.

== See also ==
- List of number-one dance hits (United States)
- List of artists who reached number one on the US Dance chart
