= Three Drives =

Dutch progressive trance duo

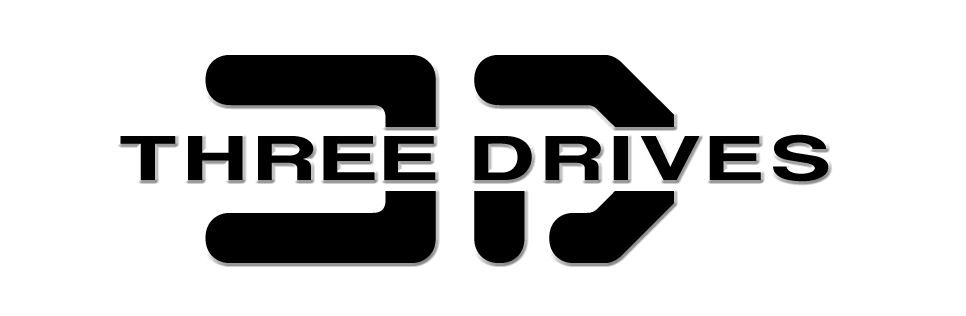

Background information
- Origin: Netherlands
- Genre: Progressive trance
- Years active: 1997–present
- Labels: Massive Drive Recordings, Armada Music, Blackhole recordings, Amsterdam Trance
- Members: Erik de Koning
- Past members: Ton van Empel

Three Drives, also known as Three Drives on a Vinyl, is a Dutch progressive trance act formed by Erik de Koning (DJ Enrico) and Ton van Empel (Ton TB). In June 2014, Van Empel left the group, leaving De Koning its sole member.

== Career ==
Their best-known tracks are "Greece 2000" (originally released in 1997 by Massive Drive Recordings, with more mainstream releases on ZYX Music and Hooj Choons) and "Sunset on Ibiza".

== Discography ==
=== Albums ===
- 1999: 2000
- 2003: Melodies from the Universe

=== Singles ===
==== Three Drives/Three Drives on a Vinyl ====
- 1997 "Greece 2000" EP – UK No. 44
- 1998 "Greece 2000" (Remixes) – UK No. 12, AUS No. 81
- 1999 "EP 2000"
- 1999 "Turkey 2000"
- 1999 "Germany 2000"
- 1999 "Superfunk"
- 2000 "Sunset on Ibiza" – UK No. 44
- 2001 "Sunset on Ibiza" (Remixes)
- 2002 "Carrera 2" – UK No. 57
- 2003 "Greece 2000" (2003 Remixes)
- 2004 "Signs from the Universe"
- 2004 "Air Traffic" – UK No. 75
- 2005 "Evolution"
- 2005 "Greece 2000" (2005 Remixes)
- 2007 "Greece 2000" (2007 Remixes)
- 2008 "Greece 2000" (2008 Remixes)
- 2008 "Together"
- 2009 "Automatic City"
- 2008 "Together"
- 2012 "Letting You Go"
- 2012 "Deep Sea"
- 2014 "Summer Madness"
- 2015 "Back to Basic"
- 2015 "Icon" (with Binary Finary)
- 2016 "Chakra"
- 2016 "Beneath the Stars"
- 2016 "Maria"
- 2017 "Athena"
- 2017 "Nasa"
- 2017 "Somewhere Out There"
- 2017 "Sirens of the Sea"
- 2017 "United as One"
- 2017 "Paradise Inc"
- 2017 "Barracuda"
- 2018 "Panga"

==== Fate Federation ====
- 2003 "Mesmerize" / "Crime Scene"
- 2003 "Narcotics Guide" / "Mayhem"
- 2005 "Urbanoids" / "Kind Wishes"

==== Tangled Universe ====
- 2002 "Message from the Universe" / "Cosmic Synts"
- 2002 "Sparkling Message"
- 2003 "Next Victim" / "Blind Date"
- 2003 "Rain & Thunder" / "Execute Mode" / "Hyper Threading"
- 2005 "I Miss You" / "For a Reason"

==== Other aliases ====
- 1997 "Lovin'", as Love Foundation (with Marc van Dale)
- 1997 "Together", as Department 1
- 1997 "Trujacq/Good Food", as Positiv
- 1997 "Foreign Affair", as Force Full
- 1999 "Never Enough", as Love Foundation (with Marc van Dale)
- 2001 "Intensive Aqua", as Legal Traders
