= Ubik (song) =

Single by Timo Maas featuring Martin Bettinghaus

from the album Loud
- Released: 2000
- Label: Perfecto
- Songwriter(s): Martin Bettinghaus, Andreas Bollessen, Martin Buttrich, Timo Maas

Timo Maas singles chronology
"Twin Town" (1999)	"Ubik" (2000)	"Connected" (2001)

UK 12" vinyl cover

"Ubik" is a song by German electronic musician Timo Maas, featuring the vocals of Martin Bettinghaus. It was released in 2000 as the first single from Maas's debut album, Loud (2002). The song reached No. 33 on the UK Singles Chart.

== Track listing ==
=== UK CD 1 ===
1. "Ubik: The Breakz" (Radio Mix)
2. "Ubik: The Breakz" (Original Mix)
3. "Ubik: The Techno"

=== UK CD 2 ===
1. "Ubik: The Dance" (Radio Mix)
2. "Ubik: The Dance" (Original Mix Instrumental)
3. "Ubik: The Dance" (Original Mix)

=== UK 12" Double Vinyl ===
1. "Ubik: The Breakz" (Original Mix)
2. "Ubik: The Dance" (Original Mix)
3. "Ubik: The Breakz" (Half Vocal Mix)
4. "Ubik: The Dance" (Original Mix Instrumental)

== Weekly charts ==
Weekly chart performance for "Ubik"
Chart (2000)	Peak position
UK Singles (OCC)	33
UK Dance (OCC)	4
UK Indie (OCC)	1
