= Protoculture =

Passing of behaviors from one generation to another among non-human primates

In physical anthropology, protoculture is the passing of behaviours from one generation to another among non-human primates.

For example, tool usage is learned between generations within chimpanzee troops. One troop of chimpanzees may exhibit a learned behavior unique from another troop of chimpanzees, such as various tool usage. Some chimpanzee troops have been observed consuming aspilia, for medicinal purposes, because it has been seen to remove intestinal parasites, and is otherwise unpalatable.
