= Max Graham =

Maximilian Graham
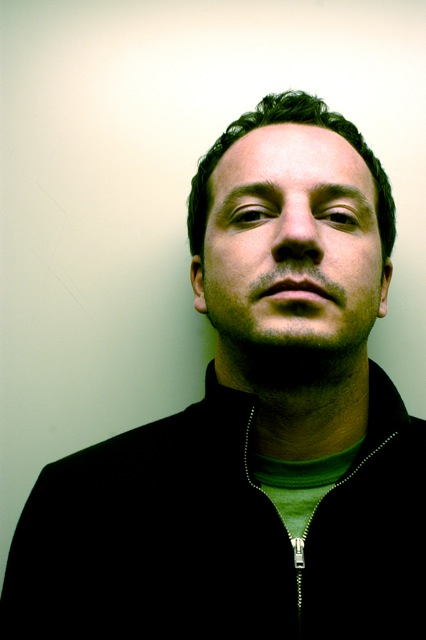
- Graham in 2006

Background information
- Born: Max Graham; April 17, 1971 (age 55); London, England
- Origin: Ottawa, Ontario, Canada
- Genres: Progressive house, house, techno, trance
- Occupations: Disc jockey, Record producer, Remixer
- Instruments: Turntables, keyboards, programming, piano, drums
- Years active: 1984–1985 (turntablist), 1993–present (DJ), 2000–present (Producer)
- Labels: Re*brand Records, Cycles

Max Graham (/ˈɡreɪəm/; born April 17, 1971) is a British-Canadian DJ, composer, and producer of dance music. Known for fusing progressive house, trance, and techno, he is most famous for his open-to-close DJ Sets (where he typically plays 5 to 8 hours), his Cycles CD series/radio show, and his remix of the classic song "Owner of a Lonely Heart" (by Yes) in 2005. He is also the founder of record labels Re*Brand and Cycles.

== Biography ==
Graham was born in London, England, and lived in Spain, New York City and Los Angeles before settling in Ottawa, Canada, in 1989. At age 15, in 1986, he began as a hip-hop DJ before discovering dance music in the 1990s. He was a resident DJ at the famed Atomic Nightclub in Ottawa from 1997 to 2001. He has been touring globally as a DJ and producing melodic dance music since 2000.

== Career ==
=== 1997–2001: Atomic Nightclub, Hope Recordings ===
During his residency at Atomic Nightclub, Graham was discovered by label executives and signed to Hope Recordings; one of his first productions, “Airtight”, was noticed by Nick Warren and Paul Oakenfold in 2000. Oakenfold subsequently put two of Graham's tracks on his album Another World. Tiesto also put “Airtight” on his In Search of Sunrise 2 album. That same year, “Airtight” was nominated for a Juno Award. He gained immediate acclaim and was voted #23 in the DJMag top 100 DJs for 2001 and was chosen to mix the famous Tranceport CD Series (Tranceport 4) that year.

=== 2002–2004: ShineMusic and the "sidechain" mixes ===
Graham created the "Shine" concept in 2002, which included a mix CD, a label (Shinemusic), and club nights. In 2004, Graham signed two singles to Sander Kleinenberg's Little Mountain label, entitled "Does She Know Yet?" and "Automatic Weapon". His remixes at the time went by the name "Max Graham's Sidechain Mix", named after the bass-pad sound that was heavily sidechained in his tracks. Included in these remixes was Guy Gerber's “Stoppage Time”, released on John Digweed's Bedrock Label.

=== 2005–2006: "Owner of a Lonely Heart", Essential Mix ===
Graham produced a bootleg remix of Yes track "Owner of a Lonely Heart", which was played on BBC Radio 1 and signed by Ministry of Sound and released globally. It reached #9 in the UK, giving Graham his first Top-10 UK Hit. During this same period, Graham was signed to the Bullitt agency and released music on Deep Dish's Yoshitoshi Recordings, including the single "Crank". 2006 saw him invited for his first Essential Mix.

=== 2008–2010: Armada, Cycles and Radio (Artist album) ===
In 2008, Graham shifted to a more melodic sound and signed with Armada Music. He began his CD series Cycles, which featured 8 compilations throughout the series, including a selection of progressive and trance songs. In 2010, he release his first artist album, Radio, which included collaborations with Jessica Riddle, Neev Kennedy, Ana Criado and Protoculture.

=== 2011–2014: open-to-close sets, trance, and "The Evil ID" ===
From 2008 to 2017, Graham released a new Cycles CD almost every year as a self-proclaimed "snapshot" of his current DJ sound. He also began touring exclusively playing open-to-close shows, where he focused on a wide variety of genres and a true journey of music. Producing under his own name, he made singles "Sun In The Winter", "Nothing Else Matters", and the hit "The Evil ID", which was championed by Armin Van Buuren at Tomorrowland. Graham also performed regularly at A State Of Trance shows. During that period, Graham teamed up with Protoculture to release a string of singles and remixes, including a remake of Grace's "Not Over Yet".

=== 2015–2017: Leaving Armada, moving away from trance, changing sound ===
In 2015, Graham began to move away from trance (due to the changing sound that no longer appealed to him) and left Armada, closing down his Rebrand label in the process. His sound changed, and he started the label Cycles with Black Hole Recordings. This period saw more underground releases, like "Redemption" and "One Hundred", and showcased deeper sounds such as the tracks "Argentina" and "Sunrise in Flight". He also collaborated with Estiva on the track "Generation".

=== 2017: The End of Cycles ===
In late 2017, Graham announced via Facebook that he was ending the weekly Cycles Radio episodes and taking an extended break from touring and making music.

=== 2019: The Return ===
In 2019, Graham returned to the scene and announced via social media in August that he was in the studio working on his second artist album as well as relaunching Cycles Radio with a new monthly format. In March 2021, however, Graham announced that he would be taking another indefinite hiatus.

=== DJing ===
Graham is known mostly these days as a DJ for his open-to-close sets, where he typically plays 6–8 hours. He has performed on Above and Beyond's Group Therapy Radio (multiple times), Pete Tong's Essential Mix, John Digweed's Transitions, and Armin van Buuren's A State of Trance. He has toured to over 75 countries and performed at such festivals as Ultra, Tomorrowland and Dance Valley as well as performed at some of the most famed venues in the world, including Pacha, Ibiza; Ushuaia, Ibiza; Twilo, New York; Space Terrace, Miami; and open-to-close sets at Cielo, New York, and Output, New York.

=== Production ===
Graham's production varies in genre and has been at times hard to classify. Under his name, he makes predominantly progressive house and progressive trance, while he also makes techno under the alias Shelter.

=== Label Ownership ===
He has owned three record labels: ShineMusic, Rebrand Records and Cycles Music. In total, he hosted Cycles Radio for 337 episodes from

== Discography ==
=== Studio albums ===
- 2010: Radio – Armada Music

=== Mix albums ===
- 1996: A Delicate Sound of Many – Unknown
- 2000: Cream CD2 – Yul Records
- 2001: Transport 4 – Kinetic Records
- 2004: Shine – System Recordings
- 2005: Mixmag Live – DMC
- 2007: Bal En Blanc – Bal En Blanc
- 2008: Re*Brand, The Story so Far – Armada Music
- 2008: Max Graham Presents Cycles – Armada Music
- 2010: Max Graham Presents Cycles2 – Armada Music
- 2011: Max Graham Presents Cycles3 – Armada Music
- 2013: Max Graham Presents Cycles4 – Armada Music
- 2014: Max Graham Presents Cycles5 – Armada Music
- 2015: Cycles6 Mixed by Max Graham – Armada Music
- 2016: Cycles7 Mixed by Max Graham – Black Hole Recordings
- 2017: Cycles8 Mixed by Max Graham – Black Hole Recordings

=== Singles ===
- 2000: Love the Bomb – Teknology
- 2000: Backdraft – Hope Recordings
- 2001: Shoreline – Hope Recordings
- 2001: Bar None – Hope Recordings
- 2001: Airtight – Hope Recordings
- 2001: Yaletown – Hope Recordings
- 2001: Skyline – Hope Recordings
- 2001: Falling Together – Hope Recordings
- 2001: Sepia – Hope Recordings
- 2001: Dying to Survive – Hope Recordings
- 2002: Tell You – Hope Recordings
- 2004: Coastline – Shinemusic
- 2004: Does She Know Yet – Little Mountain Recordings
- 2004: Automatic Weapon – Little Mountain Recordings
- 2005: Gone Feat Jessica Riddle – Shinemusic
- 2005: Owner of a Lonely Heart vs Yes – Ministry of Sound Record Label
- 2005: Crank – Yoshitoshi Recordings
- 2006: Space Disco – Re*Brand Records
- 2006: Cosmic Funk – Re*Brand Records
- 2007: Smack – Re*Brand Records
- 2008: Carbine – Re*Brand Records w/ Armada Music
- 2008: Turkish Delight – Re*Brand Records w/ Armada Music
- 2008: Frozen – Re*Brand Records w/ Armada Music
- 2008: The Power of One – Re*Brand Records w/ Armada Music
- 2008: Clear View Feat Jessica Riddle – Tell me – Re*Brand Records w/ Armada Music
- 2010: Sun in the Winter Feat Neev Kennedy – Coldharbour Recordings
- 2010: Dusky 2010 (Does She Know Yet) – Re*Brand Records w/ Armada Music
- 2010: Nothing Else Matters Feat Ana Criado – Re*Brand Records w/ Armada Music
- 2011: F.Y.C. – Re*Brand Records w/ Armada Music
- 2011: So Caught Up feat Neev Kennedy Armada Music
- 2012: Still There's You Feat Jeza – Re*Brand Records w/ Armada Music
- 2012: Sona – Re*Brand Records w/ Armada Music
- 2013: Where You Are Feat Alana Aldea – Re*Brand Records w/ Armada Music
- 2013: Diamonds with Tania Zygar – Re*Brand Records w/ Armada Music
- 2013: The Evil ID – Re*Brand Records w/ Armada Music
- 2014: Lekker with Maarten de Jong – Re*Brand Records w/ Armada Music
- 2014: Axiom with Protoculture – Re*Brand Records w/ Armada Music
- 2014: Purple – Re*Brand Records w/ Armada Music
- 2015: Rock Steady (as Shelter) – Yin Yang
- 2015: Redemption – Cycles w/ Black Hole Recordings
- 2015: Pinned (as Shelter) – Yin Yang
- 2015: One Hundred (Late Night Mix; Raw Mix) – Cycles w/ Black Hole Recordings
- 2015: Sunrise in Flight / Argentina – Cycles Blackhole Recordings
- 2016: End Beginning – Cycles w/ Black Hole Recordings
- 2016: Amnesia – Cycles w/ Black Hole Recordings
- 2017: Generation with Estiva – Cycles w/ Black Hole Recordings
- 2017: BCN – Cycles w/ Black Hole Recordings
- 2017: Guiding Light feat. Neev Kennedy – Cycles w/ Black Hole Recordings

=== Remixes ===
- 2000: Bullitt – Cried to Dream – Virgin Music
- 2000: Starecase – Lost 22 – Hope Recordings
- 2000: Subgod – Velodrome TV – Polyester
- 2000: Vicious Cycles – Vicious Cycles – Platipus Records
- 2001: Uberzone – Bounce – Astralwerks
- 2001: Conjure One – Redemption – Nettwerk
- 2001: globe – Can't Stop Fallin' In Love – Avex Trax
- 2002: Conjure One – Sleep – Nettwerk
- 2002: Cultivate – Broken Pieces – Lost Language
- 2002: Barakka – Song to the Siren – Lost Language
- 2003: Strawberry Fields – Release Records
- 2004: Madoka – Afterburner – Private Reality
- 2004: Mack Vibe feat. Jaqueline - Can't Let you Go - Curvve
- 2004: Jase From Outta Space – Do What You Want – Shine Music
- 2004: Tilt – Twelve – Lost Language
- 2004: DT8 Project – Winter – Data Records
- 2005: Sam Perez – Across the Ocean – Yoshitoshi
- 2005: Leah – Contact High – Wooden Records
- 2006: Filterheadz – Endless Summer – Love Distortion
- 2007: Purple Code – The Rising – Re*Brand Records
- 2008: Marcus Schossow – Swedish Beatballs – Coldharbour
- 2008: Jerome Isma – Vila Nova – Electric
- 2010: tyDi Feat. Tanya Zygar – Half Light – AVA Recordings
- 2010: Filo & Peri ft. Audrey Gallagher – This Night – VANDIT
- 2011: Grace – Not Over Yet w/ Protoculture – Perfecto
- 2011: Protoculture – Topaz – Re*Brand Records w/ Armada Music
- 2012: Solarstone & Scott Bond – 3rd Earth – Captivating Sounds w/ Armada Music
- 2013: Gabriel & Dresden ft. Neil Ormandy – Tomorrow Comes w/ Protoculture – Organized Nature w/ Armada Music
- 2015: Solid Stone ft. Jennifer Rene – Not Enough – Re*Brand Records w/ Armada Music
- 2017: Forerunners – Relic – Cycles w/ Black Hole Recordings
- 2019: Michael & Levan with Stiven Rivic – Stardust – Kunai Music

=== DJ Magazine Top 100 rankings ===
- 2001: No. 23 (Debut)
- 2002: No. 83
- 2003: No. 56
- 2004: No. 64
- 2005: No. 96
