= Kinetic Records =

American record label

- Founder: Steve Lau
- Country of origin: United States
- Location: New York City

Kinetic Records was a New York City-based record label founded by Steve Lau (founding member of Sire Records act the Ocean Blue), and co-owned with Alyson Shapero. The label launched the careers of artists and DJs such as Paul Oakenfold, BT, Ray Munns, Deepsky, Kosheen, Tilt, Timo Maas, Grace, Sandra Collins, Billy Thermal, Binary Finary, and Shpongle. Other successful artists on the label included Ash, Sasha and John Digweed, South, Faithless, DJ DAN, LTJ Bukem, Dario G, Luomo, Infected Mushroom, Max Graham, Dave Ralph Music Instructor, and Hybrid. It was also well known for its Tranceport series, of which Paul Oakenfold's first installment is considered to be the breakthrough record for the trance genre with the highest sales of any mix compilation. The release of Sasha's Airdrawndagger and Sasha and Digweed's mix compilation Communicate were also big releases for the label. Kinetic was the exclusive distributor of the Perfecto label in the US as well as the Another Late Night compilation series, which featured Howie B., Fila Brazillia, and Rae and Christian. The label was distributed by Reprise/Warner Bros. Records from its inception until 2001, when Kinetic switched distribution to BMG. The latter eventually absorbed the label during the merger with Sony Music.

== See also ==
- List of record labels
