= Paul Oakenfold discography =

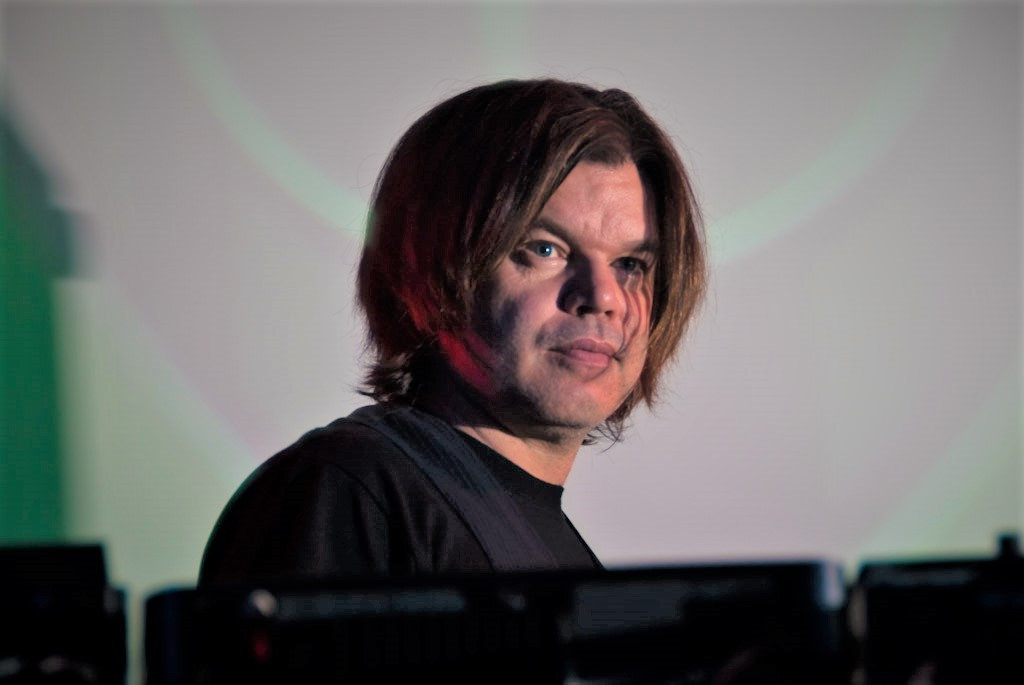
- Studio albums: 4
- Soundtrack albums: 57
- Compilation albums: 1
- Video albums: 2
- DJ mixes: 17

This is the discography of the trance DJ and record producer Paul Oakenfold.

== Albums ==
=== Studio albums ===
Title	Album details	Peak chart positions					
Title	Album details	UK	AUS	NZ	NLD	US	US Dance
Bunkka	Released: 18 June 2002; Label: Perfecto (UK)/Maverick (US)	25	47	35	—	65	1
A Lively Mind	Released: 5 June 2006; Label: Perfecto (UK)/Maverick (US)	57	—	—	—	145	7
Trance Mission	Released: 20 June 2014; Label: Perfecto, Armada	—	—	—	14	—	—
Shine On	Released: 21 January 2022; Label: Perfecto	—	—	—	—	—	—

=== Soundtracks ===
Title	Album details	Peak chart positions
Title	Album details	AUS
Swordfish	Released: 2001; Label: Perfecto	72
Vexille	Released: 2007	—

=== Compilation albums ===
- Greatest Hits & Remixes, Vol. 1 (2007)
- Never Mind the Bollocks... Here's Paul Oakenfold (2011)
- Four Seasons (2012)

=== Live albums ===
- Global Underground 004 (1997)
- Global Underground 007 (1998)

=== Video albums ===
- A Voyage into Trance (2001)
- 24:7 (documentary and live concert; 2008)

=== DJ mixes ===
For both of his Global Underground mixes, see above in the Live albums section.

Year	Title
1994	Goa Mix
1994	Ministry of Sound: The Sessions Vol 2
1994	Journeys By DJ 5: Journey Through the Spectrum
1995	A Voyage Into Trance
1995	Perfection: A Perfecto Compilation
1996	Perfecto Fluoro
1997	Fantazia Presents the House Collection 6
1997	Cream Anthems 97
1998	Tranceport
1999	Resident: Two Years of Oakenfold at Cream
2000	Perfecto Presents: Travelling
2000	Perfecto Presents: Another World
2000	Essential Selection Vol. 1 with Fatboy Slim
2001	Perfecto Presents Ibiza
2003	Perfecto Presents: Great Wall
2004	Creamfields
2005	Perfecto Presents: The Club
2008	Oakenfold Anthems
2009	Perfecto: Vegas
2010	Goa Mix 2011
2011	We Are Planet Perfecto Volume 1
2012	We Are Planet Perfecto Volume 2
2013	We Are Planet Perfecto Volume 3: Vegas to Ibiza
2013	Perfecto Records Miami 2013
2014	We Are Planet Perfecto Volume 4
2015	25 Years of Perfecto Records
2015	We Are Planet Perfecto Volume 5: Back to My House
2017	Dreamstate Volume One
2018	Mount Everest – The Base Camp Mix
2019	Sunset at Stonehenge

== Singles ==
=== 1988–2010 ===
Year	Title	Chart positions									Album
Year	Title	UK	AUS	FIN	IRE	NLD	NZ	RUS	US	US Dance	Album
1988	"Jibaro" (as Electra)	54	—	—	—	—	—	—	—	—	Non-album singles
1989	"Destiny" / "Autumn Love" (as Electra)	51	—	—	—	—	—	—	—	—	Non-album singles
1990	"Sunrise" (as Movement 98 featuring Carroll Thompson)	27	—	—	—	—	—	—	—	—	Non-album singles
1990	"Joy and Heartbreak" (as Movement 98 featuring Carroll Thompson)	58	—	—	—	—	—	—	—	—	Non-album singles
1993	"I Can't Take Your Love" (as B-Real)	—	—	—	—	—	—	—	—	—	Journeys By DJ Volume 5: Journey Through The Spectrum
1994	"The Single" (as Rise)	70	—	—	—	—	—	—	—	—	The Perfecto Album
1995	"Reach Up (Papa's Got a Brand New Pig Bag)" (as Perfecto Allstarz)	6	82	—	—	36	—	—	—	—	The Goa Mix
1995	"Sun" (as Virus)	62	—	—	—	—	—	—	—	—	The Goa Mix
1995	"Moon" (as Virus)	36	—	—	—	—	—	—	—	—	Perfection: A Perfecto Compilation
1995	"Not Over Yet" (as Grace)	6	144	—	4	—	—	—	—	—	If I Could Fly
1995	"I Want to Live" (as Grace)	30	—	—	—	—	—	—	—	—	If I Could Fly
1995	"Dreams" (as Wild Colour)	25	—	—	—	—	—	—	—	—	Perfection: A Perfecto Compilation
1996	"Skin on Skin" (as Grace)	21	147	—	—	—	—	—	—	—	If I Could Fly
1996	"Down to Earth" (as Grace)	20	—	—	—	—	—	—	—	—	If I Could Fly
1996	"If I Could Fly" (as Grace)	29	—	—	—	—	—	—	—	—	If I Could Fly
1997	"Hand in Hand" (as Grace)	38	—	—	—	—	—	—	—	—	If I Could Fly
1997	"Down to Earth" (Ascension Remix) (as Grace)	29	—	—	—	—	—	—	—	—	If I Could Fly
1997	"Georgie Girl" (as Planet Perfecto featuring Joe 90)	—	—	—	—	—	—	—	—	—	Non-album singles
1999	"Not Over Yet 1999" (as Planet Perfecto featuring Grace)	16	90	—	—	—	—	—	—	—	Non-album singles
1999	"Bullet in the Gun" (as Planet Perfecto)	15	—	—	—	—	—	—	—	—	Non-album singles
2000	"Big Brother UK TV Theme" (as Elementfour)	4	—	—	—	—	—	—	—	—	Perfecto Presents: Travelling
2000	"Bullet in the Gun 2000" (as Planet Perfecto)	7	—	—	—	—	—	—	—	—	Perfecto Presents: Travelling
2001	"Planet Rock" (vs Afrika Bambaataa & the Soulsonic Force)	47	—	—	—	—	—	—	—	21	Swordfish <<The Album>>
2001	"Bites Da Dust" (as Planet Perfecto)	52	—	—	—	—	—	—	—	—	Perfecto Collection
2002	"Southern Sun" / "Ready Steady Go"	16	55	—	—	—	—	—	—	9	Bunkka
2002	"Starry Eyed Surprise" (featuring Shifty Shellshock)	6	37	—	21	53	19	—	41	10	Bunkka
2003	"The Harder They Come"	38	—	—	—	—	—	—	—	—	Bunkka
2003	"Hypnotised" (featuring Tiff Lacey)	57	—	17	—	97	—	—	—	41	Bunkka
2003	"Rubberneckin'" (Oakenfold Remix)	5	3	6	10	4	18	22	94	—	2nd to None
2005	"The Club Theme" (as Perfecto Allstarz)	—	—	—	—	—	—	—	—	—	Perfecto Presents: The Club
2006	"Faster Kill Pussycat" (featuring Brittany Murphy)	7	44	—	17	74	19	—	—	4	A Lively Mind
2006	"Sex 'n' Money" (featuring Pharrell)	101	—	13	—	—	—	—	—	5	A Lively Mind
2010	"Remember Love" (as DJ's United)	—	—	—	—	—	—	—	—	—	We Are Planet Perfecto, Vol. 1
2010	"Firefly" (featuring Matt Goss)	—	—	—	—	—	—	—	—	39	We Are Planet Perfecto, Vol. 1
"—" denotes the single did not chart or was not released in that country

=== Since 2011 ===
Year	Title	Album
2011	"Tokyo"	Never Mind the Bollocks... Here's Paul Oakenfold
2011	"Groove Machine" (with Marco V)	Never Mind the Bollocks... Here's Paul Oakenfold
2011	"Full Moon Party"	Never Mind the Bollocks... Here's Paul Oakenfold
2011	"I'm Alive" (featuring Infected Mushroom)	Never Mind the Bollocks... Here's Paul Oakenfold
2011	"Sleep" (featuring Tamra)	We Are Planet Perfecto, Vol. 1
2012	"Maybe It's Over" (featuring Tamra Keenan)	We Are Planet Perfecto, Vol. 1
2012	"Pop Star" (featuring Robert Vadney)	Four Seasons
2012	"Glow in the Dark"	Four Seasons
2012	"Surrender" (featuring J Hart)	Four Seasons
2012	"Come Together"	Four Seasons
2012	"As We Collide" (with Christian Burns and JES)	Simple Modern Answers
2013	"Touch the Sky" (with Matt Goss featuring The Concrete Sneakers)	We Are Planet Perfecto, Vol. 2
2013	"Who Do You Love?" (featuring Austin Bis)	We Are Planet Perfecto, Vol. 3
2013	"Beautiful World" (with Disfunktion featuring Spitfire)	We Are Planet Perfecto, Vol. 3
2013	"Turn It On"	We Are Planet Perfecto, Vol. 3
2013	"Top of the World" (with Joyriders)	Non-album single
2013	"Touched by You" (featuring J Hart)	We Are Planet Perfecto, Vol. 3 – Vegas to Ibiza
2013	"Hollywood" (with Mickey Avalon)	I Get Even EP
2014	"Café del Mar"	Trance Mission
2014	"Toca Me"	Trance Mission
2014	"Madagascar"	Trance Mission
2014	"Barber's Adagio for Strings"	Trance Mission
2014	"Ibiza"	We Are Planet Perfecto, Vol. 4 – #fullonfluoro
2014	"Touch Me" (with Cass Fox)	Trance Mission
2014	"You Could Be Happy" (featuring Angela McCluskey)	Back to My House – #WAPP05
2015	"Lonely Ones" (featuring Tawiah)	Back to My House – #WAPP05
2015	"Otherside"	Back to My House – #WAPP05
2015	"The DJ Made Me Stay" (with Joyriders featuring CeCe Peniston)	Back to My House – #WAPP05
2016	"Bla Bla Bla"	Non-album single
2016	"Shanghai Baby"	Dreamstate, Vol. 1
2016	"U Are" (featuring BRKLYN and Amba Shepherd)	Non-album single
2017	"Amnesia" (with Jordan Suckley)	Dreamstate, Vol. 1
2018	"A Slice of Heaven" (with Ferry Corsten)	Non-album singles
2018	"Only Us" (featuring Little Nikki)	Non-album singles
2018	"Lost in the Moment" (with Jam El Mar)	Non-album singles
2019	"Stonehenge"	Sunset at Stonehenge
2019	"Summer Nights" (with Galestian)	Non-album singles
2020	"With You" (with Alexander Popov featuring Lzrz)	Non-album singles
2020	"The World Can Wait" (with Luis Fonsi)	Shine On
2020	"The Perfect Song" (with Fey)	Non-album single
2020	"What's Your Love Like" (with Eve and Baby E)	Shine On
2021	"Hypnotic" (featuring Azealia Banks)	Shine On
2021	"I'm In Love" (featuring Aloe Blacc)	Shine On
2022	"I'm Into It" (with Zhu and Velvet Cash)	Shine On

== Remixes ==
=== Charted remixes ===
Year	Artist	Title	Peak positions										Album
Year	Artist	Title	UK	AUS	BEL (FL)	GER	IRE	NLD	NZ	SWI	US	US Dance	Album
1986	DJ Jazzy Jeff & the Fresh Prince	"Girls Ain't Nothing But Trouble" (Laidley & Oakenfold Mix) (UK/GER)	21	—	—	—	—	—	—	—	—	—	singles only
1989	Cry Sisco!	"Afro Dizzi Act" (Paul Oakenfolds Raid Mix)	42	—	—	—	—	40	—	—	—	—	singles only
1990	Jesus Loves You	"Generations of Love" (Land Of Oz Mix)	80	—	—	—	—	—	—	—	—	—	The Martyr Mantras
1990	The Strings of Love	"Nothing Has Been Proved" (Paul Oakenfold Remix)	59	—	—	—	—	—	—	—	—	—	singles only
1990	Frazier Chorus	"Nothing" (Paul Oakenfold Mix)	51	—	—	—	—	—	—	—	—	—	singles only
1990	The Cure	"Close to Me" (Closer/Closest Mix)	13	—	—	49	4	—	27	—	97	32	Mixed Up
1992	Gary Clail & On-U Sound System	"Who Pays the Piper?" (Perfecto Mix)	31	—	—	—	—	—	—	—	—	—	single only
1993	Gary Clail & On-U Sound System	"These Things Are Worth Fighting For" (Perfecto Mix)	45	—	—	—	—	—	—	—	—	—	Dreamstealers
1994	D:Ream	"U R the Best Thing" (Perfecto Mix)	4	9	46	65	6	25	—	35	—	—	singles only
1994	Shara Nelson	"Nobody" (Perfecto Mix)	49	—	—	—	—	—	—	—	—	—	singles only
1994	Opus III	"Hand in Hand (Looking for Sweet Inspiration)" (Perfecto Mix)	—	—	—	—	—	—	—	—	—	14	singles only
1994	Snoop Doggy Dogg	"Doggy Dogg World" (Perfecto Mix)	32	—	—	—	29	—	—	—	—	—	singles only
1997	California Sunshine	"Summer '89" (Oakenfold Edit)	56	—	—	—	—	—	—	—	—	—	singles only
2003	Elvis Presley	"Rubberneckin'" (Paul Oakenfold Remix)	5	3	17	—	10	4	18	19	94	—	Hitstory
"—" denotes releases that did not chart or were not released.

=== Non-charting remixes ===
- LZ7 – "Together" (Paul Oakenfold Remix)
- Juno Reactor – "Conquistador I" (Paul Oakenfold Remix)
- Billy Idol – "One Breath Away" (Paul Oakenfold Remix)
- Take That – "Happy Now" (Paul Oakenfold Remix)
- Daft Punk – "C.L.U." (Paul Oakenfold Remix)
- Michael Jackson – "One More Chance" (Paul Oakenfold Remix)
- James Newton Howard – "Signs" (Paul Oakenfold Remix)
- Hans Zimmer – "Jack Suite" (Paul Oakenfold Remix)
- Maroon 5 featuring Rihanna – "If I Never See Your Face Again" (Paul Oakenfold Remix)
- Britney Spears – "Gimme More" (Paul Oakenfold Remix)
- Madonna – "Give It 2 Me" (Paul Oakenfold Remix)
- Danny Elfman – "Rule the Planet" (Paul Oakenfold Remix)
- Justin Timberlake featuring T.I. – "My Love" (Paul Oakenfold Remix)
- Dave Matthew Band – "When the Worlds Ends" (Paul Oakenfold Remix)
- Christophe Beck – "The Pink Panther Theme" (Paul Oakenfold Remix)
- The Jackson 5 – "Dancing Machine" (Paul Oakenfold Remix)
- Paul Simon – "Crazy Love, Vol. II" (Paul Oakenfold Remix)
- Dave Matthews Band – "When the World Ends" (Paul Oakenfold Remix)
- David Arnold – "James Bond Theme" (Bond vs. Oakenfold)
- Jan Johnston – "Unafraid" (Paul Oakenfold Remix)
- Bruno Mars – "Locked Out Of Heaven" (Paul Oakenfold Remix)
- Hans Zimmer – "Interstellar Theme" (Paul Oakenfold Remix)
- Madonna – "Celebration" (Paul Oakenfold Remix)
- Jennifer Lopez – "I'm Glad" (Paul Oakenfold Perfecto Remix)
- Clint Mansell – "Æternal" (Paul Oakenfold Remix)
- Muse – "New Born" (Paul Oakenfold Remix)
- N*E*R*D – "Lapdance" (Paul Oakenfold Swordfish Mix)
- Giorgio Moroder – "The Chase" (Paul Oakenfold Remix)
- Mylène Farmer – "Pourvu qu'elles soient douces" (Paul Oakenfold Remix)
- Adele – "Rolling in the Deep" (Paul Oakenfold Remix)
- Sa Dingding – "Ha Ha Li Li" (Paul Oakenfold Remix)
- Peter Connelly – "The Last Revolution Theme" (Paul Oakenfold Remix) (from Tomb Raider: The Last Revelation)
- Shawyze – "Get U Home" (Paul Oakenfold Remix)
- Joyriders – "Big Brother UK Theme" (Paul Oakenfold Remix)
- Kim Wilde – "Cambodia" (Paul Oakenfold Remix)
- Julien-K – "Spiral" (Paul Oakenfold Remix)
- Armin van Buuren – "Communication" (Paul Oakenfold Full On Fluoro Mix)
- BT – "Flaming June" (Paul Oakenfold Remix)

== Soundtracks ==
Year	Project	Type
1999	Entropy	Film
2000	Get Carter	Film
2000	UEFA Euro 2000	Video game
2000	Kevin & Perry Go Large	Film
2000	Requiem for a Dream	Film
2000-2018	Big Brother (1–19)	TV
2000-2018	Celebrity Big Brother (1–22)	TV
2001	Swordfish: The Album	Film
2001	Planet of the Apes	Film
2001	Alias	TV
2002	The Bourne Identity	Film
2002	Marvel's Blade II: Bloodhunter	Film
2002	Birds of Prey: Primal Scream	TV
2002	Austin Powers: Goldmember	Film
2003	Fastlane	TV
2003	Die Another Day	Film
2003	The Matrix Reloaded	Film
2003	NBC Las Vegas	TV
2003	Hollywood Homicide	Film
2004	Appleseed	Film
2004	Big Brother's Efourum	TV
2004	GoldenEye: Rogue Agent	Video game
2004	Collateral	Film
2004	Big Brother Panto	TV
2005	FIFA Football 2005	Video game
2006	The Pink Panther	Film
2006	The O.C.	TV
2006	Studio 60 on the Sunset Strip	Film
2006	The Best of Celebrity Big Brother	TV
2007	Pirates of the Caribbean: At World's End	Film
2007	Nobel Son	Film
2007	Forza Motorsport 2	Video game
2007	Vexille	Film
2007	Shoot 'Em Up	Film
2007	The Game Plan	Film
2007	Fred Claus	Film
2008	Drive Thru: Japan	
2008	Californication	TV
2008	The Heavy	Film
2008	Fever	
2008	The Bourne Conspiracy	Video game
2008	Speed Racer	Film
2008	Nothing Like the Holidays	Film
2008	Interzone Futebol	Video game
2010	Ultimate Big Brother	TV
2010	EA Sports FIFA Superstars	Video game
