= Creamfields (2004 album) =

Compilation album by Paul Oakenfold

Compilation album (DJ mix) by Paul Oakenfold
- Released: 9 August 2004
- Recorded: 2004 (mixed)
- Genres: Trance; progressive trance
- Length: 138:12
- Labels: New State; Thrive
- Producer: Paul Oakenfold

Paul Oakenfold chronology
Perfecto Presents: Great Wall (2003)	Creamfields (2004)	Perfecto Presents: The Club (2005)

Creamfields is the fifteenth DJ mix album by British electronic producer and disc jockey Paul Oakenfold, released in 2004. The double album was inspired by the annual Creamfields festival which at the time took place at the "Old Liverpool Airfield" organised by the Cream brand where Oakenfold had often performed. The album was released to commemorate Oakenfold's performance at the sixth annual Creamfields festival which took place several weeks after the album's release on 28 August 2004. Oakenfold's performance at the festival was headlining the Cream/Goodgreef and Mixmag Arena. Creamfields was also the third in a series of mix albums of the same name commemorating the festival, with previous albums by different DJs being released in 2000 and 2001, with both releases carrying the same name. Oakenfold's Creamfields was considered a relaunch of the series

Musically, the album was a return to his "epic" progressive trance style that he had popularised on his acclaimed mix albums Goa Mix (1994) and Perfecto Fluoro (1996). Like those albums, film dialogue appears, and also features a tribute to Goa Mix via a remixed version of that album's "Point Zero" by Li Kwan. Creamfields also produced several remixes made for the album, and an original song also made exclusively for the album, "I Found You" by Interstate, which was released as a successful single. The album received positive reviews from critics and was subsequently nominated for "Best Electronic/Dance Album" at the 2005 Grammy Awards. The album also reached the top 50 of the UK Compilation Chart.

== Background ==
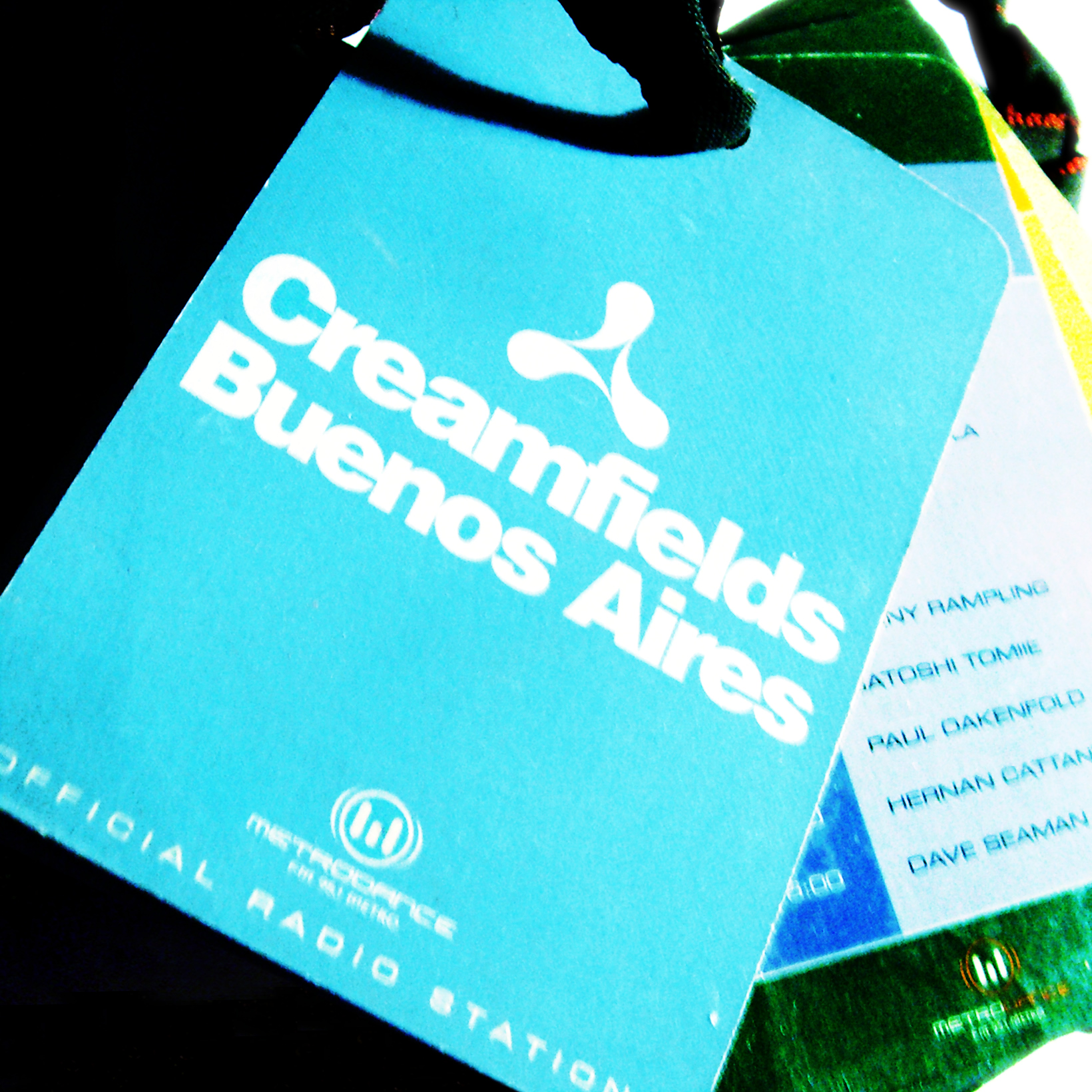
The album was inspired by the Creamfields festival.

In August 1998, popular Liverpool club night Cream launched an outdoor annual electronic music festival, Creamfields, to take place each August bank holiday. At the time, Oakenfold was a resident DJ at Cream. The successful inaugural event received an attendance of 25,000 festival goers to Winchester in Hampshire, England. For its second edition in 1999, Creamfields moved to the Old Liverpool Airfield, where it remained until 2006. By 2004, the festival's attendance had largely increased, reaching as much as 200,000 attenders each year. For the third event in 2000, Creamfields released a double DJ mix album on Virgin Records, simply titled Creamfields, which reached number 5 in the UK Compilation Chart. The compilation was a studio mix but commemorated the event. For the fourth event in 2001, Creamfields released another album with the same name mixed by Seb Fontaine and Yousef, who appeared at that year's event, although this release was less successful, reaching number 27 in the UK Compilation Chart, and receiving a mixed to negative review from Dean Carlson of AllMusic. The lesser success of this release halted the series, and no album was released for the fifth event in 2002.

Oakenfold had performed at the festival many times. When the festival launched in 1998, Oakenfold had finished his first of two years as a resident DJ at Cream, releasing the DJ mix album Resident. Two Years of Oakenfold at Cream. (1999) as his contract finished, although this was not Oakenfold's first release for the club. Initially, Oakenfold had mixed a quarter of their acclaimed release Cream Live (1995), and a third of its follow-up, Cream Live Two (1996), which featured in Q's 1997 list of "The 10 Best DJ Mix Albums...Ever!". At the end of 1997, he mixed half of the club's year-end release Cream Anthems 97, with the other half being mixed by Nick Warren. Besides his role with Cream, Oakenfold had become a popular worldwide DJ, releasing successful DJ mix albums such as Global Underground: Live in Oslo (1997), Global Underground 007: New York (1998), Tranceport (1998) and Perfecto Presents: Another World (2000). These albums were all big sellers, with Another World at the time being the biggest-selling mix album ever in the US. His mix albums also received acclaim, with Tranceport retrospectively being ranked at number 23 in the 2012 Rolling Stone list of "The 30 Greatest EDM Albums Ever". Nonetheless, with his first studio album of original material, Bunkka (2002), many of his fans were polarised with the new poppier direction he had taken, and although continuing to be a big name DJ, he had lost several fans. Oakenfold described Bunkka as an example of him pushing his own boundaries and being influenced by other genres, but whilst the album sold a million copies worldwide, becoming his best-selling album, the mixed fan response lead Oakenfold wanting to return to older styles he had popularised, such as progressive trance and Goa trance.

By 2004, other Creamfields events were being held in other locations around the world, although the original Creamfields continued to be held at the Old Liverpool Airfield. For the 2004 Creamfields event held at the Old Liverpool Airfield, the sixth such annual Creamfields held in England on 28 August 2004, Oakenfold headlined the Cream/Goodgreef and Mixmag Arena. For the event, Oakenfold and Creamfields decided that Oakenfold could mix a DJ mix album to promote his performance. The album would relaunch the Creamfields DJ mix album series and commemorate the event.

== Music ==
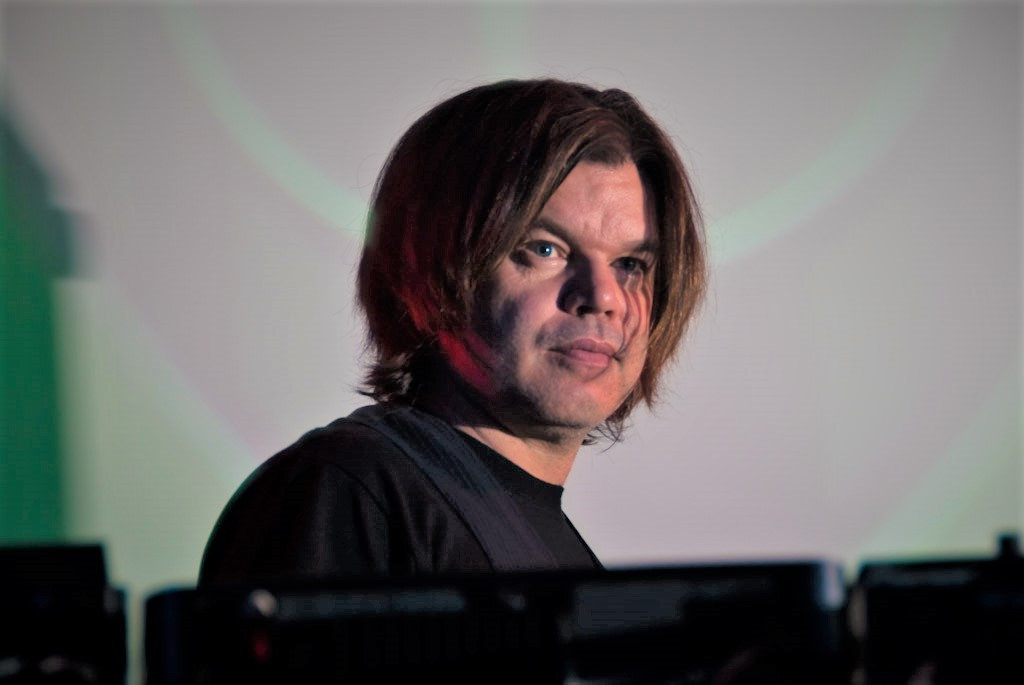
Oakenfold in 2009.

In many ways, Creamfields marked a return to the "epic" trance style Oakenfold had popularised in the 1990s on mixes such as Goa Mix (1994) and Perfecto Fluoro (1996). The opening track is Li Kwan's "Point Zero", albeit in a remixed form known as "Point Zero 2004", is a nod to Goa Mix, which features the same track as its third track. The second song on the album, "I Found U" by the production duo of music producer Mike Burns and Mark Lewis known as Interstate, was later released as a single and made a big impact among fans, reaching number one in several countries. The song was written for the album and had not previously been released. The pace is slightly increased with Duran & Aytek’s "First Sight", which has Balearic influences. The "typically uplifting elements of trance" are brought into the mix with "Clear Blue" from Markus Schulz presents Elevation, whose beat has been described as "infectious". Paul Oakenfold's mix of Carlos Vives's "Como Tu" was described as a "delicious combination of worldbeat chant and dancefloor drama," and "truly symphonic in feel. Fundamentally trance in sound, it’s structured in a very progressive way. The subtle nuances of this track would be lost in a big arena but emphasised in a small club." By the appearance of "12" by Tilt, the mix reaches strong progressive trance territory with a slightly darker twist. Like the aforementioned Goa Mix and Perfecto Fluoro, film dialogue also appears in the album, here in the shape of Quivver's "Space Manoeuvres", which contains samples of speech from the 1998 movie Dark City.

On the second disc, Oakenfold "discovers breaks, bleeps, and bloops for the first part of the set, works steadily up to his epic U2 remix, and exits with a couple reliable stompers." The song opens with the progressive breaks of "Ocean of Love" by Suzy Solar. Pinkbox Special's "Nice Guys Finish Last", the third track on the disc, was noted for managing "to maintain the so far prog breaks feel within the mix," with the pace speeding up with the next track, Lemon 8's remix of Girl Nobody's "Cages". Stel & Good Newz’s "Particle" has an "atmospheric breakdown leading into an uplifting tone." The tenth and eleventh tracks on the disc are both "2004 Mixes" by Oakenfold created exclusively for the compilation. The first of these, a remix of U2's 2000 single "Beautiful Day", is sometimes seen as the disc's highlight.

== Release and reception ==
Professional ratings
Review scores
Source	Rating
Allmusic	3/5 stars
Resident Advisor	4/5 stars

The album was released on 9 August 2004 by New State Recordings, nineteen days before his performance at the festival, and was the first Creamfields album to be released on the label, as the previous two albums were released by Virgin Records. The album was released in both the UK and the US, whereas the previous albums were only released in the UK. Ultimately, the album was not as commercially successful as previous Creamfields albums in the UK, only reaching number 49 in the UK Compilation Chart, but the copies sold in the US assured it was more popular than the 2001 Creamfields album. The album was successful enough to the point where Creamfields continued to release albums in the series, mixed by a DJ appearing at the festival. The subsequent edition, 2005's Creamfields mixed by Ferry Corsten, was slightly more commercially successful in the UK, reaching number 44 in the UK Compilation Chart.

The album received positive reviews from music critics. Antonella Sirec of Resident Advisor rated the album four stars out of five (4.0/5), stating "overall, [she] thoroughly enjoyed listening to this compilation not just once but many times over. With a combination of both old and new, this was a pleasure for [her] to experience. Technically, the mixing is quite simple but it's predominantly about the music. While many of us have moved on to other aspects of the underground, [She has] always made a concerted effort to stay in touch with [her] trance roots. Not every trance release is great but compilations such as this are a real indulgence." She also noted "as a DJ, Paul Oakenfold managed to surprise me greatly, which is exactly what he achieved with this Creamfields mix. This will not be to everyone’s tastes but it fits [hers]," noting the album was a comeback for Oakenfold after his less certain direction taken with his studio album Bunkka, and stated she preferred the first disc. David Jeffries of Allmusic rated the album three out of five stars, stating "there are thrills but few surprises from this one-time maverick, but if Oakie is trying to sonically reproduce the massive size of a Creamfields' event, he's done it. Skip past the lackluster kickoff and think film composer John Williams as a DJ with a wicked haircut." Unlike Sirec, Jeffries preferred the second disc.

The album was subsequently nominated for "Best Electronic/Dance Album" at the 47th Annual Grammy Awards in 2005, the first time the award was held at the Grammy Awards. It was one of five albums nominated, and one of two mix albums. The award was won by Basement Jaxx's Kish Kash (2003). Nine years after the album's release, Oakenfold and Cream would team up for another mix album, as Oakenfold mixed Cream's twenty-first anniversary album, Cream 21 (2013).

== Track listing ==
=== Disc one ===
1. "Point Zero" by Li Kwan, presented by Matt Darey
2. "I Found U" by Interstate
3. "First Sight" by Duran and Aytek
4. "Wadi" by Sultan & The Greek
5. "Clear Blue" by Elevation, presented by Markus Schulz
6. "Como Tu (Paul Oakenfold Mix)" by Carlos Vives
7. "12" by Tilt
8. "Living the Dream" by D:Fuse and JES
9. "Space Manœuveres Part 3" by Quivver
10. "The World Doesn't Know" by Tilt
11. "Jump the Next Train (Probspot Mix)" by Young Parisians featuring Ben Lost

=== Disc two ===
1. "Ocean of Love" by Suzy Solar
2. "One Day" by NuBreed and Luke Chable
3. "Nice Guys Finish Last" by Pinkbox Special
4. "Cages (Lemon 8 Mix)" by Girl Nobody
5. "Scatterbomb (Original String Mix)" by The Sneaker
6. "Perfect Wave" by Peter Martin Presents Anthanasia
7. "Time of Your Life (Shane 54 Mix)" by Paul Oakenfold
8. "People Want to be Needed" by Auranaut
9. "Particle" by Stel & Good Newz
10. "Beautiful Day (Paul Oakenfold 2004 Mix)" by U2
11. "Lizard (Paul Oakenfold 2004 Remix)" by Mauro Picotto
12. "I'm Not Fooled (JOOF Tranced Out Mix)" by John "00" Fleming

== Chart positions ==
UK Compilation Chart: #49
