= Perfecto Presents: Another World =

Another World

Remix album by Paul Oakenfold
- Released: 19 September 2000
- Recorded: 2000 (mixed)
- Genres: Electronica; Goa trance; progressive trance; art pop
- Length: 148:27 (74:51 – disc one; 73:36 – disc two)
- Labels: London; Sire; Perfecto
- Producer: Paul Oakenfold
- Compiler: Paul Oakenfold

Paul Oakenfold chronology
Perfecto Presents: Travelling (2000)	Another World (2000)	Perfecto Presents Ibiza (2001)

Perfecto Presents: Another World is the twelfth DJ mix album by British electronic music producer Paul Oakenfold, released in 2000. It is the second instalment in his Perfecto Presents series, a series of DJ mix albums themed around Oakenfold's label Perfecto Records. The album employs Oakenfold's progressive trance sound and sees a return to the Goa trance sound he had helped popularise with Goa Mix (1994) and Perfecto Fluoro (1996). Similar to those albums, it also features a more eclectic array of music genres, featuring music from film soundtracks, the ethereal wave band Dead Can Dance and a remix of a Led Zeppelin song. Although the album received mixed reviews from critics, at the time of release, it became the biggest-selling DJ mix album in the United States, where it reached the Top 50 of the Top Electronic Albums chart.

== Background ==
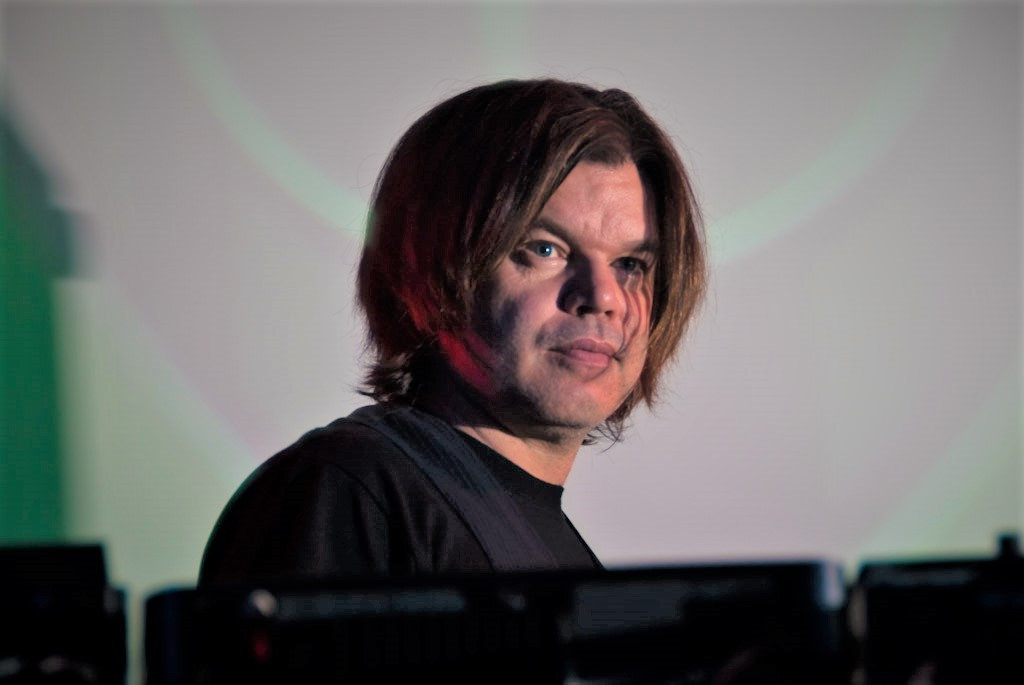
Oakenfold in 2009.

With his Essential Mix instalment Goa Mix (1994), released as an album in 1995, and Perfecto Fluoro (1996), Oakenfold had helped popularise a subgenre of the emerging progressive trance genre known as Goa trance, originating from the beaches of Goa, India. Both albums received critical acclaim. In this era, he was experiencing a surge in popularity, and in June 1995, he became the first DJ to play on the main stage at the Glastonbury Festival in Somerset for 90,000 people, a performance which he considers his favourite gig. Broadening his usage of various styles of dance music, his mix album Global Underground: Live in Oslo (1997), a double mix CD in the Global Underground series recorded live at Cosmopolite Club in Oslo, Norway, as part of the official launch of the Quart Festival, was noted for showcasing Oakenfold's eclectic taste in music at the time, as the mix combines various forms of dance music. His second instalment for the series, Global Underground 007: New York (1998), has become the best-selling album in the series, selling 150,000 copies.

The two Global Underground albums were seen as particularly launching his career in the United States, and his trance music-based Tranceport (1998) was ranked at number 23 in Rolling Stone's 2012 list of "The 30 Greatest EDM Albums Ever". After his two-year residency contract with Cream expired in 1999, Oakenfold toured the United States. Such was the success of Global Underground 007: New York that, with increasing demand for British dance music in the United States, making up over two-thirds of the Global Underground label's sales, a New York office was opened in on Ninth Avenue in Manhattan. The Mekka Electronic Music Festival, otherwise known as the "electronic Lollapallooza" took place in ten cities in the United States and Canada during August and September, including New York City, Los Angeles, Toronto and San Francisco. The event featured Oakenfold amongst other electronic artists. Oakenfold next moved to Los Angeles to work on film soundtracks and to focus his DJing stateside.

His experiences with the United States influenced the creation of his Perfecto Presents series of mix albums. Launched with Perfecto Presents: Travelling (2000), the series built on his eclectic usage of music and the albums were themed. Perfecto Presents: Another World was the second instalment in the series.

== Music ==
Oakenfold continues with the style of progressive trance and Goa trance styles had first explored six years earlier on Goa Mix (1994). As with Goa Mix, samples of Lisa Gerrard's vocals and snatches of dialogue from the Blade Runner soundtrack are dropped into the mix (notably Roy Batty's final speech), which is used between the last two tracks on the first disc. As with another of his other mix albums, Perfecto Fluoro (1996), snatches of dialogue from other films are present as they form part of the tracks used. For example, the dialogue sample he inserted into Tatonie's "Music" is from the film Contact (1997).

John Bush of Allmusic said, "perhaps realizing that the market for progressive trance mix albums was fast approaching saturation amidst a raft of inferior products, Paul Oakenfold displayed a touch more variety" with this album, noting that whilst the album contains tracks from "the usual trance producers" such as Timo Maas, Salt Tank, Tone Depth and LSG, as well as signings to Oakenfold's Perfecto Records label, the album "incorporates snippets from more atmospheric sources, including Dead Can Dance and Vangelis' soundtrack classic, Blade Runner. And he even tapped Perfecto stalwart Quivver to apply the trance treatment to Led Zeppelin's "Babe I'm Gonna Leave You"", a remix that he noted "applies a sleek backing to a few of Robert Plant's bluesier vocal lines."

== Release ==
The album was released in the United States and Canada on September 19, 2000. In the United States, it was released on Sire Records. In Canada, the album was released as a collaboration between both Sire Records and London Records. To promote the album, a sample CD containing eight tracks entitled Perfecto Presents: Another World Sampler was released before the album. It was only released as a promotional disc sent to radio stations to promote the album. Similarly, another promotional sample CD entitled Selections from Perfecto Presents: Another World, featuring the first four tracks from both discs, was released after the album in October 2000. After the album was released in the United States, Perfecto Presents: Another World soon became the biggest-selling DJ mix album of all time, and once the Top Electronic Albums chart (later renamed the Dance/Electronic Albums chart) was launched in June 2001, the album appeared in the top 50.

== Critical reception ==
Professional ratings
Aggregate scores
Source	Rating
Metacritic	(62/100)
Review scores
Source	Rating
AllMusic	2.5/5 stars
Robert Christgau	C
Rolling Stone	3.5/5 stars
Spin	(5/10)
Wall of Sound	(8.3/10)

The album received mixed to positive reviews from music critics. The album holds a 62/100 score on Metacritic from six reviews. John Bush of Allmusic rated the album two and a half stars out of five, saying "Except for these stylistic detours (two tracks from Blade Runner, with one each from Dead Can Dance and the group's vocalist Lisa Gerrard), Another World is the same old trance album. There are a few intriguing anthems that manage to wear out their welcome over the course of seven minutes and up, plenty of breakdowns to maintain attention on the dancefloor, and an overall pleasant sound that simply floats by without making much of a positive impact." Spin awarded the album a half-perfect score and stated "the human element is a diva parade that skates by like Lilith Fair on (dry) ice: opera-lite from Jan Johnston, squishy spiritualism from Dead Can Dance, the dread Sarah McLachlan belting the coda of DJ Tiesto's remix of Delerium's "The Silence"." More positive reviews came from Rolling Stone, who rated the album with three and a half stars out of five, stating "Oakenfold steers the ultra-European, classical-minded pulse of trance toward syncopated rhythms, drum-free interludes and actual songs." Wall of Sound gave the album an 8.3/10 score, saying that "working from a crate stuffed with quality cuts that blur the lines between trance, techno, and tribal house, Oakenfold deliberately showcases selections that err on the melancholy or contemplative side... Contrasted against the sometimes formulaic feel of Oakenfold's other comps, this is a stellar reminder of why he's remained a superstar for so long in a genre that's notorious for its short attention span."

Oakenfold continued the Perfecto Presents series with his final two instalments for the series, Perfecto Presents Ibiza (2001), released eleven months later, and Perfecto Presents.... Great Wall (2003). Timo Maas, who features on Another World, also mixed the instalment Perfecto Presents: Connected (2001).

== Track listing ==
=== Disc 1 ===
1. Dead Can Dance - "The Host of the Seraphim" (from the Baraka Soundtrack)
2. Tone Depth - "Into Being"
3. Chilled Eskimo - "Take Me Away" (Circulation Mix)
4. Led Zeppelin - "Babe I'm Gonna Leave You" (The Quivver Mix)
5. Timo Maas - "Ubik" (Dance Mix)
6. LSG - "Into Deep"
7. Max Graham - "Airtight"
8. Planet Perfecto - "Bullet in a Gun" (Rabbit in the Moon Mix)
9. Brancaccio and Aisher - "Darker" (Reset the Brakes Mix)
10. Dead Can Dance - "Sanvean"
11. Highland - "No Way Out" (Highland Mix)
12. Max Graham - "Bar None"
13. Vangelis - "Tears in Rain" (from the Blade Runner soundtrack)
14. Amoebassassin - "Piledriver" (Grayed Out Summer Mix)

=== Disc 2 ===
1. Jamez Presents: Tatoine - "Music"
2. Salt Tank - "Eugina 2000" (Progressive Summer Mix)
3. Vengeance ft. Claire Pearce - "Song to the Siren" (Fable Mix)
4. Skope - "Back & Front"
5. Jan Johnston - "Flesh" (Dj Tiësto Mix)
6. Vangelis - "Rachel's Song" (from the Blade Runner soundtrack)
7. Lisa Gerrard - "Sacrifice"
8. Lost It.com - "Animal"
9. Blackwatch - "Northsky"
10. Delerium - "Silence" (DJ Tiësto's in Search of Sunrise Remix)
