= Resident. Two Years of Oakenfold at Cream. =

Compilation album by Paul Oakenfold
- Released: 15 March 1999
- Recorded: Cream, Liverpool
- Genre: Progressive trance; progressive house
- Label: Virgin

Paul Oakenfold chronology
Tranceport (1998)	Resident. Two Years of Oakenfold at Cream. (1999)	Perfecto Presents: Travelling (2000)

Resident. Two Years of Oakenfold at Cream. is a DJ mix album by Paul Oakenfold.

== Critical reception ==
Professional ratings
Review scores
Source	Rating
Allmusic	4/5 stars

Jason Birchmeier of Allmusic rated the album four stars out of five, saying "Practically every track Oakenfold drops is an anthem, having been spun a million nights over, from London to Ibiza to Miami. A picture-perfect snapshot of a memorable moment in dance-music history."

== Track listing ==
=== Disc 1 ===
1. Y-Traxx – "Mystery Land" (Original Mix)
2. Tilt – "Butterfly" (Tilt's Mechanism Mix)
3. Armin van Buuren – "Blue Fear" (Extended Mix)
4. Space Brothers – "Shine" (Full Vocal)
5. Ascension – "Someone" (Original Vocal Mix)
6. Brainbug – "Nightmare" (Sinister Strings Mix)
7. Three 'N' One – "Sin City" (Original Mix)
8. Underworld – "Dark and Long (Dark Train)" (Original Mix)
9. B.B.E. – "Flash" (Club Mix)
10. LSG – "Netherworld" (Vinyl Cut)
11. Transa – "Prophase" (X-Cabs Remix One)
12. Man With No Name – "Vavoom!" (Original Mix)
13. Mystica "Ever Rest" (Mystica Mix)
14. C.J. Bolland – "The Prophet" (Original Mix)

=== Disc 2 ===
1. Taste Xperience feat. Natasha Pearl – "Summersault" (Original Mix)
2. Mansun – "Wide Open Space" (Perfecto Mix)
3. Tilt vs. Paul van Dyk – "Rendezvous" (Quadraphonic Mix)
4. Stone Proof – "Everything's Not You" (Quivver's Space Edit)
5. Tilt – "Children" (Tilt's Courtyard Mix)
6. Freefall feat. Jan Johnston – "Skydive" (Original Mix)
7. Push – "Universal Nation" (Original Mix)
8. Amoeba Assassin – "Rollercoaster" (Oakey's Courtyard Mix)
9. Planet Heaven – "Nautical Bodies" (Original Mix)
10. Groovezone – "Eisbaer" (Soul Hooligan Radio Edit)
11. C.M. – "Dream Universe" (Original Mix)
12. Agnelli and Nelson – "El Nino" (Matt Darey Mix)
13. Tekara feat. Lucy Cotter – "Breathe in You" (Tekara's M and M Dub)
14. Transa – "Enervate" (Original Mix)
