= The Goa Mix =

Remix album (DJ mix) by Paul Oakenfold
- Released: 18 December 1994 (radio broadcast); Late 1995 (original album); 1 November 2010 (The Goa Mix 2011)
- Recorded: Late 1994 (original)
- Genres: Goa trance, progressive house, progressive trance
- Length: 118:09 (1995; 53:37 (Silver Mix), 64:32 (Gold Mix)); 153:55 (2010)
- Labels: Cream Records (1995); New State Music (2010)
- Producers: Eddie Gordon, Paul Oakenfold

Paul Oakenfold chronology
A Voyage into Trance (1995)	The Goa Mix (1994)	Perfecto Fluoro (1996)

The Goa Mix (also known as Goa Mix) is a two-hour DJ mix by British musician and DJ Paul Oakenfold. It was originally broadcast on BBC Radio 1 as an Essential Mix on 18 December 1994 after the producer of the show, Eddie Gordon, chose Oakenfold to produce an eclectic DJ mix for the show which featured a burgeoning variation of electronic styles, having begun the previous year. Oakenfold had, at this point, developed his own unique Goa trance sound, influenced by his time at hippy gatherings on beaches in Goa, and employed it heavily into the mix, which also made pioneering use of film score samples. Oakenfold used the mix as an experiment in which he tried to fuse electronic music, especially trance music, with film score music, and then to overlay the result with vocal parts, samples and additional production. The mix was split into two parts, later referred to as the Silver Mix and the Gold Mix respectively. Reflecting the Goa influence, the album title did not evolve beyond its simplistic working name.

Today The Goa Mix is regarded as groundbreaking and a landmark for Oakenfold, Essential Mix and Goa trance. It was released as a limited edition album by Cream Records in 1995 and was later reworked by Oakenfold as The Goa Mix 2011 for release in 2010 on New State Music. It was voted the best Essential Mix ever by BBC Radio 1 listeners in 2000 and also won a Silver Award in the Specialist Music Programme category at the 1997 Sony Radio Awards.

== Background ==
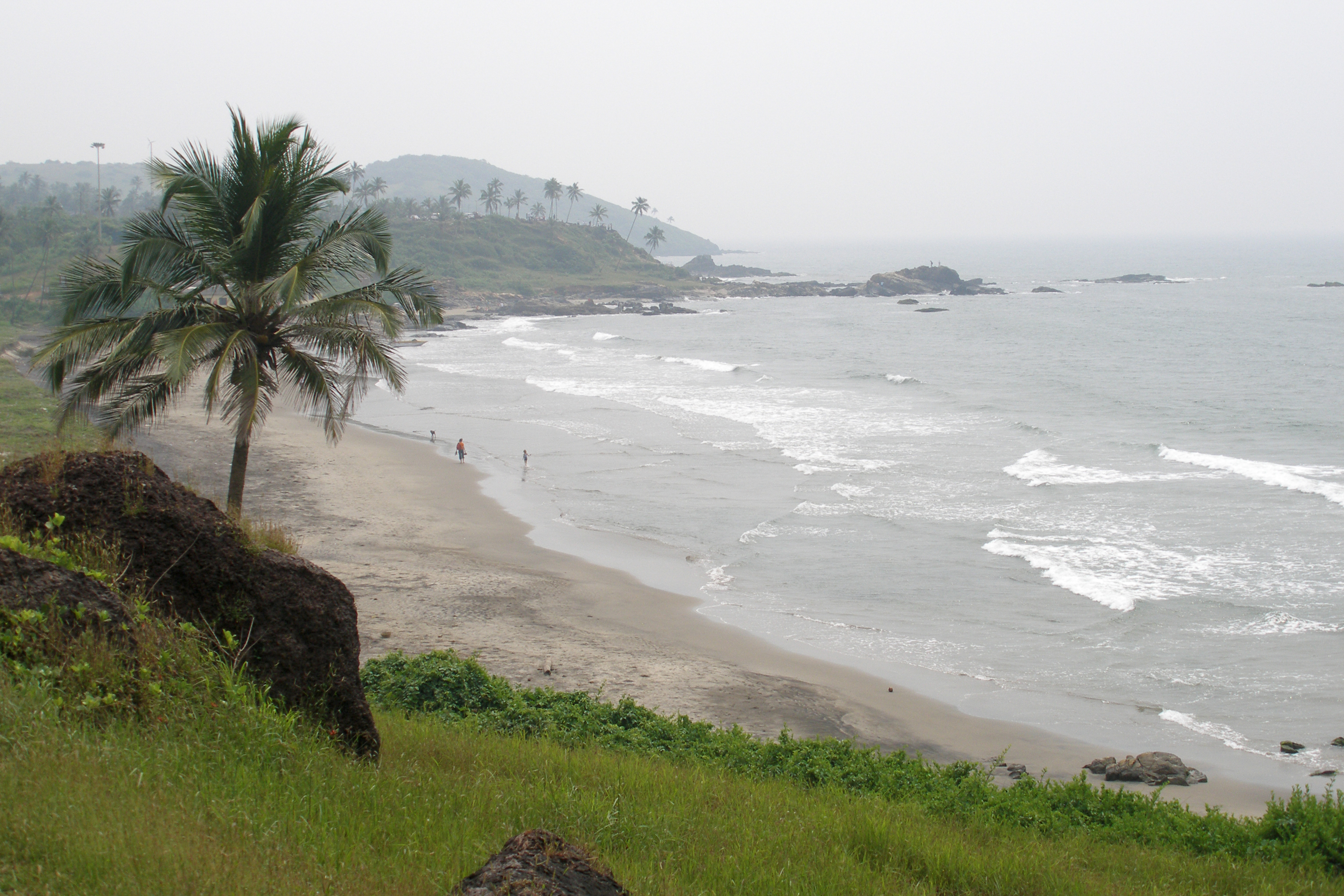
Oakenfold was inspired by his time on the beaches of Goa (pictured).

In 1992, when U2 released their single "Even Better Than the Real Thing", Paul Oakenfold's "Perfecto Mix", named after his record label Perfecto Records, reached a higher chart position in the UK Singles Chart than the original version, reaching number 8 – the original had reached number 12. In 1993 with the success of his last remix as Perfecto, he was hired by U2 to provide a DJ set in a support band slot on their innovative Zoo TV Tour, replacing BP Fallon on the 1993 legs in Europe and Australia, New Zealand, and Japan, with more than fifty shows on the "Zooropa '93" and "Zoomerang" legs from 7 May to 10 December of the same year.

It was also at this time that Oakenfold began producing his own tracks as well, and after visiting the beaches of Goa in India, he began blending their native Goa music, fusing it with similar-sounding European tracks to create his own distinct sound. The term for this style of music became known as Goa trance, and predated the typical current usage for the term trance music. Goa trance is characterised by making heavy use of melodies and synthesizers in its structure, as opposed to the bass lines and rhythms of house music that was prevalent in UK nightclubs. Goa trance was also typified by having more beats per minute (BPM) than most other genres of dance music.

Meanwhile, English musician and DJ Eddie Gordon launched the pre-recorded Essential Mix weekly radio show on BBC Radio 1 in 1993, a show where DJs perform an uninterrupted two hour DJ mix. With an eclectic array of DJs given their own "Essential Mix", it naturally featured many different styles of electronic dance music. The show was launched with a Pete Tong mix on 30 October 1993 after Gordon advised Radio 1 that a weekly dance mix show with DJs of different genres of music would offer more variety and the chance for the ever burgeoning UK dance music scene to flourish with new emerging DJs as well as the internationally famous. Gordon further encouraged the DJs that he scheduled to flex their musical knowledge as the broadcast was not essentially playing to a dance floor but to people listening in their homes, noting that a high number of listeners were recording the show on cassette to listen to later. Hence, a need for a straight out "four-on-the-floor" seamless 130bpm mix for two hours was not totally necessary so the DJs could include more eclectic music or offer something different from their normal set.

With this eclectic concept in mind, Gordon booked Oakenfold for an Essential Mix in 1994. Wanting to present his newfound sound, Oakenfold produced a two-hour Goa trance mix broadcast on Sunday 20 March 1994. Whilst a success, Oakenfold would continue developing the sound, and ultimately would take it to greater depths on his second Essential Mix after he had been booked again for another edition for the early morning of Sunday 18 December 1994, what is now referred to as the Goa Mix.

== Broadcast and composition ==
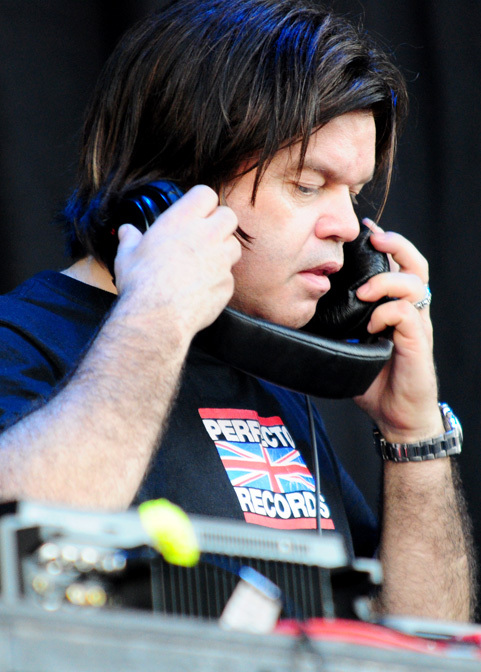
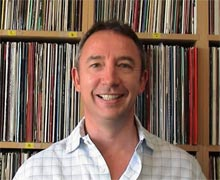
Paul Oakenfold and Eddie Gordon (both pictured in 2009).

As the most requested broadcast on BBC Radio 1, the Goa Mix has been considered pioneering. First broadcast on the early morning of 18 December 1994 as the 59th edition of Essential Mix, the sound was predominantly influenced by the trance parties taking place on the hippie beaches of Goa, India at that time. These Full Moon parties involved European travelers dancing to the Goa trance sound, and its contrast with the bass lines and rhythms of house music that was prevalent in UK night clubs made it an introduction to the sound for many UK listeners. As prompted by Gordon, Oakenfold lightened the harsh, dark sounds of Goa trance by incorporating European records into this broadcast and mixing in movie soundtracks and audio samples to retain audience interest. Whilst it has been noted that many contemporary big name DJs use this aesthetic today, it has been considered unheard of at the time of the Goa Mix. Partly due to Gordon witnessing various DJs delivering two hour house or trance mixes which he found too repetitive, the Goa Mix featured musically changing gears to take the listener up and down in mood. Oakenfold would later state that with the Goa Mix, he "wanted to do something that for [him] felt right at the time," saying that, with films serving as a big influence thanks to his father in his early days, he tried to combine electronic music, trance music and film score music, and then to overlay the result with vocal parts, samples and additional production.

The two-hour broadcast was split into two halves. These halves have been referred to as the "Silver Mix" and "Gold Mix" respectively, although they are not truly halves, with the "Silver Mix" lasting 54 minutes whilst the "Gold Mix" lasts 64 minutes. The Silver Mix begins with the "eerie" vocals of Mr. V's "Give Me Life", later described by Oakenfold as "the traditional opening of a set that creates the mood, gives you the vibe, very atmospheric." It continues over the rhythm of Oakenfold's band Grace's "Skin On Skin", one of many tracks from Oakenfold's underground Perfecto label. With the third track, "Point Zero", Oakenfold would later state that "what really appealed to [him] was the atmosphere and the atmospheric vibe" and noted that when he came across it, he said it was "perfect to put the headphones and get lost in the music, and that was key to [him] on the mix." From the conclusion of the "frenetic, bleak piano" of Virtual Symmetry's "Vaporize", released Sven Väth's Eye Q label, heralds the first of many soundtrack pieces on the album, including Vangelis' "Blade Runner" and an excerpt of replicant Roy Batty's lament of memories lost, "Like Tears In Rain". After Salt Tank's "Eugina", the mix shifts a gear with the iconic "LSD" by Hallucinogen, followed by a strings composition from the Dracula soundtrack, which segues into the Arabic-tinged "Alcatraz" by Electrotete. Concluding the first hour is a trio of works from Man With No Name: "Floor Essence", his remix of Scorpio Rising's "Dubcatcher", and "Evolution".

The Gold Mix begins with Metalheads' "Inner City Life", which then progresses into a predominant Goa trance session including The Infinity Project's "Stimuli", Marmion's seminal "Schöneberg", a Man With No Name's "Deliverance". Lisa Gerrard's vocals from Dead Can Dance’s "Sanvean" start the show's conclusion with the Northern Mix of 4 Voice's "Eternal Spirit", and finally Man With No Name's "delirious" "Sugar Rush".

== Reception and legacy ==
=== Critical analysis and influence ===
Years after its creation, the Goa Mix is still viewed by DJs, clubbers and general music enthusiasts as a hallmark of Goa trance, whilst Paul Oakenfold has gone on to become one of the world's top DJs as well as a renowned producer. Resident Advisor said the mix was "groundbreaking in its cinematic two-hour scope" and an "Essential Mix frequently cited as the best and favorite by both listeners and DJs," saying the mix was "just as notable in its own right" compared to another acclaimed 1994 DJ mix, Sasha and Digweed's acclaimed album Renaissance: The Mix Collection.

Goa Mix was voted the best Essential Mix ever by the BBC Radio 1 listeners in 2000, and also won a Silver Award in the Specialist Music Programme category at the 1997 Sony Radio Awards. Don't Stay In included the mix on its 2013 article on "20 Editions of the Essential Mix everyone should hear." Dummymag included the album on its article of "10 Essential Essential Mixes."

The Goa trance sound of Goa Mix ultimately set the stage for subsequent Paul Oakenfold mix albums such as Perfecto: Fluoro (1996) and the following year's Global Underground 004: Oslo (1997). By 2000, Oakenfold had moved on from the Goa sound, paving the way for his Perfecto Presents series, his work in the studio, and recording film scores. Perhaps in a nod to the Goa Mix, Oakenfold has referenced the mix in later mix albums. Perfecto Presents: Another World (2000) also used material from Vangelis' Blade Runner soundtrack and also featured Dead Can Dance's "Sanvean", whilst the first track on his acclaimed 2004 mix album, Creamfields, is Li Kwan's "Point Zero" – a reworking of the third track on the Goa Mix from ten years before. In April 2010, the Goa Mix was aired again as one of ten Essential Mixes to mark the 500th DJ to appear on the show, and on 28 December 2013, Oakenfold gave a "commentary" on the Goa Mix, explaining the thinking behind the mix whilst it plays in the background. This was broadcast on BBC Radio 1 as part of the 20th anniversary celebrations of Essential Mix.

=== Original CD release ===
The nightclub Cream, where Oakenfold had often performed, made an official but strictly limited edition release of the album in late 1995 which was only available in the club's shop, as the songs had not officially been licensed for release. Cream had already released five Digital Audio Tape-quality recordings of live performances from the club in the shop in 1994, and similarly to the Goa Mix release, the tracks were unlicensed, and share the same record label name, Cream Records, which would soon become a real label operated by the club. Nonetheless, between the 1994 releases and Goa Mix, Cream had begun releasing commercially released, official compilation albums on electronic label Deconstruction Records in mid-1995, beginning with Cream Live, which features a mix from Oakenfold himself.

The CD release was titled The Goa Mix, with the addition of "The" to the title as a prefix, and featured a photograph of a Goa beach tinted in yellow on the album cover. It was with this release that "Goa Mix" was first used officially as the name of the mix, as it was originally a working title that Gordon gave to the conceptualised show to help Oakenfold decide a more eclectic track list. Because Oakenfold and Cream knew the album would be rare, the artwork warned people that there would most likely be bootlegs produced of it. Bootlegs were indeed made, although they can be identified as none seemed to contain the warning, nor do they contain the Cream logo on the album cover.

=== The Goa Mix 2011 ===
In 2010, Paul Oakenfold released The Goa Mix 2011, a reworked version of the mix, as a double disc album. The mix stays almost true to the original with some tracks added by Paul Oakenfold himself, and similar to how the aforementioned Renaissance: The Mix Collection by Sasha & John Digweed had been remade for its 10th anniversary edition, Oakenfold remade the mix here using contemporary technology. To create a new listening experience, the mixing between tracks feature new transitions, with some of the pieces having been covered by Oakenfold's Perfecto Symphony Orchestra, and some of the original tracks were removed in exchange for the inclusion of others. The arrangement of the whole mix was also slightly rearranged.

The album was released on 1 November 2010 on New State Music and marked the first time the Goa Mix was officially available in the shops. It was also reasonably successful commercially, reaching number 33 on the UK Compilation Chart. Allmusic acknowledged the album but did not rate or review it.

== Track listing ==
Original radio broadcast and 1995 album

=== Disc one (Silver Mix) ===
1. Mr. V – "Give Me Life" – 1:38
2. Grace – "Skin on Skin" (Orange Mix) – 6:16
3. Li Kwan – "Point Zero" – 5:37
4. The Disco Evangelists – "De Niro" (Spaceflight Mix) – 2:01
5. Virtual Symmetry – "The V.S." – 4:40
6. Vangelis – "Tears in Rain" – 2:14
7. Salt Tank – "Eugina (Pacific Diva)" – 1:25
8. Hallucinogen (featuring Ben Kempton) – "LSD" – 5:52
9. Saint Etienne (featuring Moira Lambert) – "Only Love Can Break Your Heart (A Mix of Two Halves)" – 0:18
10. Wojciech Kilar – "Vampire Hunters" – 1:00
11. Electrotete – "Alcatraz" – 6:46
12. Vangelis – "Bladerunner Main Titles" – 1:39
13. Man With No Name – "Floor Essence" – 5:49
14. Scorpio Rising – "Dubcatcher" – 3:10
15. Man With No Name – "Evolution" – 5:36

=== Disc two (Gold Mix) ===
1. Goldie (Metalheadz) – "Inner City Life" – 1:35
2. Wojciech Kilar – "Love Remembered" – 1:41
3. Voodoo People – "Co-Incidence" – 2:40
4. The Infinity Project – "Stimuli" – 5:03
5. Trance Team – "Wake Up!" (Trance Mix) – 3:03
6. V-Tracks – "Heretic Voices" – 2:09
7. Marmion – "Schöneberg (Marmion Remix) – 7:59
8. Karl Biscuit – "Hierophone" – 1:32
9. Vangelis – "Rachel's Song" – 1:39
10. Virus – "Sun" (Oakenfold & Osborne Mix) – 8:07
11. Man With No Name – "Deliverance" – 7:13
12. Perfecto Allstarz – "Reach Up!" (Indian Summer Mix) – 5:29
13. Para-Dizer – "Song Of Liberation" – 5:25
14. Dead Can Dance – "Sanvean" – 3:33
15. 4Voice – "Eternal Spirit" (Northern Mix) – 3:45
16. Man With No Name – "Sugar Rush" – 3:42

== See also ==
- Trance music

== Chart positions ==
The Goa Mix 2011

- UK Compilation Chart: #33
