= 25 Years of Perfecto Records =

Compilation album by Paul Oakenfold
- Released: 20 March 2015
- Genre: trance, uplifting trance, house, progressive house, tech house, breakbeat
- Length: CD 1: 1:00:18; CD 2: 1:12:46
- Label: Perfecto Records
- Producer: Paul Oakenfold

Paul Oakenfold chronology
We Are Planet Perfecto Volume 4 (2014)	25 Years of Perfecto Records (2015)	We Are Planet Perfecto Volume 5 – Back to My House (2015)

25 Years of Perfecto Records is a compilation album of English DJ and music producer Paul Oakenfold. It was released on March 20, 2015, by the record label Perfecto Records. This album provides an overview of Perfecto Records' musical output over the first 25 years of its existence.

== Track listing ==
=== CD 1 ===
1. Paul Oakenfold featuring Angela McCluskey – "You Could Be Happy (Paul Oakenfold Future House Radio Edit)"|3:04|
2. BT – "Embracing the Sunshine (Embracing the Future Radio Edit)"|5:20|
3. Grace – "Not Over Yet (Perfecto Radio Edit)"|4:21|
4. Robert Owens – "I’ll Be Your Friend (Glamorous Mix)"|8:52|
5. Lost – "The Gonzo (Original Mix)"|7:22|
6. Tilt – "My Spirit (Groovestation Extended Mix)"|6:50|
7. Mozaic – "Sing It (The Hallelujah Song) (Quivver’s Dirty Dub)"|8:48|
8. Quivver – "Believe in Me (Radio Edit)"|4:01|
9. Grace – "Skin on Skin (Orange Mix)"|7:58|
10. Dope Smugglaz – "The Word (Original Mix)"|5:49|
11. Stella Browne – "Every Woman Needs Love (Full Intention Mix)"|7:08|
12. Ce Ce Peniston feat. Joyriders – "Finally (Tiger Stripes Radio Edit)"|3:26|
13. Paul Oakenfold – "Southern Sun (Moe Aly Radio Edit)"|4:24|
14. Paul Oakenfold & Cassandra Fox – "Touch Me (Paul Oakenfold ‘Stateside’ Radio Edit)"|3:15|
15. Timo Maas feat. Martin Bettinghaus – "Ubik (The Dance)"|8:02|
16. Tilt vs Paul van Dyk – "Rendezvous (Tilt’s Quadraphonic Instrumental)"|8:44|
17. Man With No Name feat. Hannah– "Paint A Picture (Vocal Mix)"|5:40|
18. Man With No Name – "Vavoom (Original Mix)"|7:28|

=== CD 2 ===
1. BT "Loving You More (Man With No Name Mix)"7:00
2. Leama – "Requiem for a Dream (Paul Oakenfold Radio Edit)"3:30
3. Paul Oakenfold featuring J Hart – "Surrender (Protoculture Radio Edit)"3:32
4. Paul Oakenfold – "Cafe Del Mar (Radio Edit)"4:30
5. Mekka – "Diamondback (Original Mix)"6:50
6. Paul Oakenfold – "Barber's Adagio for Strings (Vocal Radio Edit)"4:20
7. Ascension – "Someone (Original Vocal Mix)"8:50
8. Perfecto Allstars – "Reach Up (Papa's Got a Brand New Pig Bag) (Perfecto Radio Edit)"3:40
9. Amoeba Assassin – "Rollercoaster (Oakey’s Courtyard Mix)"8:14
10. Tilt – "I Dream (Casa de Angeles Mix)"9:58
11. Man With No Name – "Floor Essence (Apogee Radio Edit)"3:53
12. Jan Johnston – "Flesh (DJ Tiësto Radio Edit)"3:53
13. Planet Perfecto Knights – "ResuRection (Paul Oakenfold Full on Fluoro Radio Edit)"3:56
14. Paul Oakenfold – "Full Moon Party (Thomas Datt Radio Edit)"3:30
15. Planet Perfecto – "Bullet in the Gun (Saturday Mix)"9:28
16. BT – "Flaming June (BT & PvD Radio Edit)"3:45
