= Mystery Land =

Mystery Land can refer to any of the following:

- Mysteryland, a series of electronic dance music festivals held by the Netherlands-based promoter ID&T
- Mystery Land (EP), by Y-Traxx
  - "Mystery Land" (song), title track featuring Neve
- "Mysteryland" (song), by Die Ärzte
