= Mike Burns (producer) =

Film director and producer (born 1973)

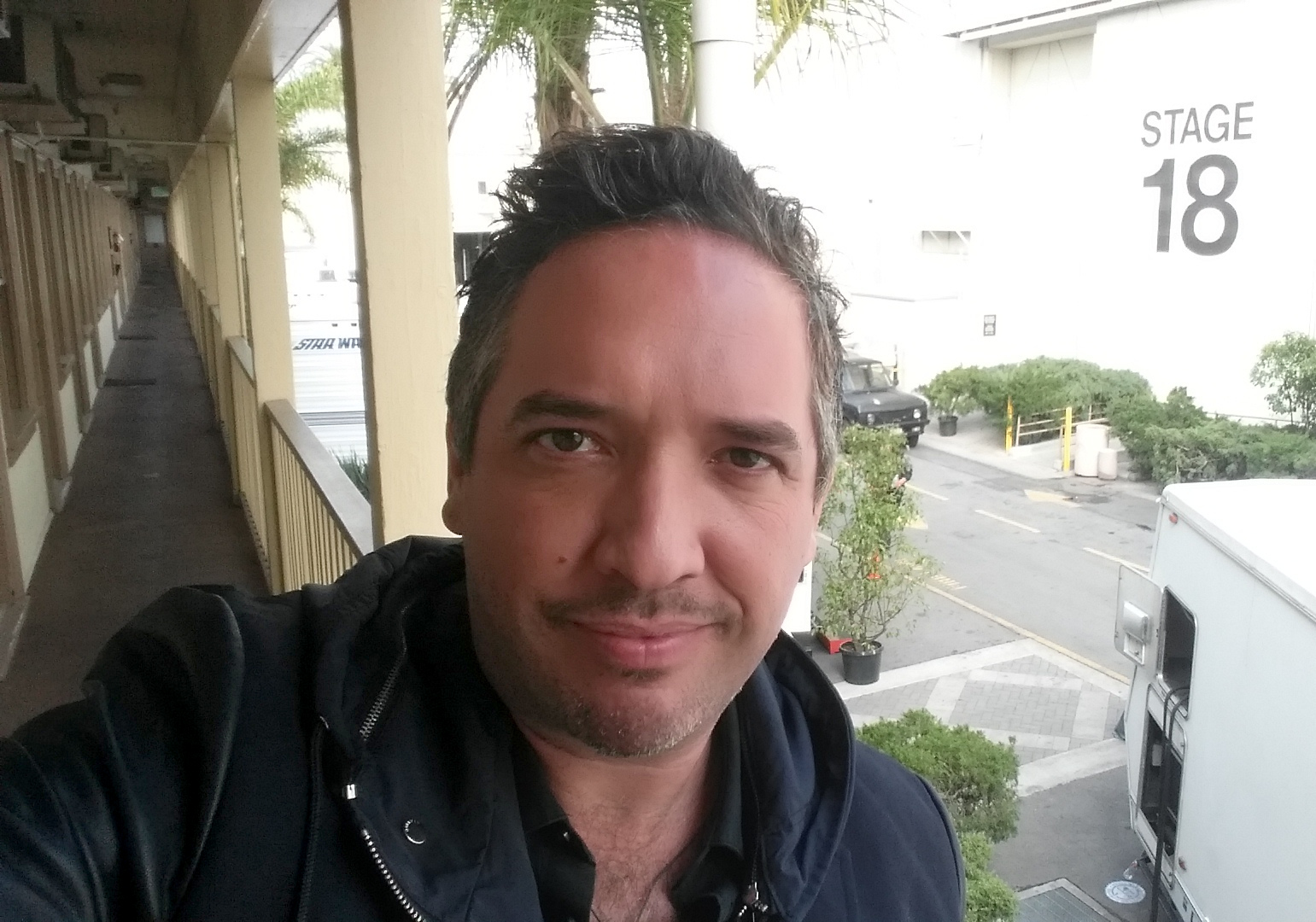

Background information
- Born: 1973 (age 52–53); Miami Beach, Florida, U.S.
- Occupations: Director, producer, songwriter

Mike Burns (born 1973) is an American film director, GRAMMY nominated songwriter, and music executive . He was a member of EDM production duo "Interstate". His work “I Found You“ written for the 2004 release Creamfields for DJ and recording artist Paul Oakenfold earned him a Grammy nomination as both a songwriter and a music producer. From 2010 to 2020 Burns worked exclusively with Lionsgate Entertainment as a music supervisor and EPK producer. He has over 80 feature film credits since launching his career in 1999. and most recently directed two feature films, Out of Death and Wrong Place both starring Bruce Willis, alongside actresses Ashley Greene and Jaime King. He also composed the original score for both of the films he produced.

== Early years ==
Burns began producing electronic music at the University of Florida, where he minored in electro-acoustic music under the direction of James P Sain. After graduating from college with a BA in history, he began to submit music to contacts in Los Angeles. After one of his early tracks was placed into the Gus Van Sant film Speedway Junky, he moved to Los Angeles to pursue a music career. Upon his arrival, he set up a recording studio on Melrose Avenue and focused on EDM. His work quickly gained the attention of DJs including Paul Oakenfold, Tiesto, Armin van Buuren, and Markus Schulz, who ultimately signed him to Armada Records, an EDM label owned by Armin. Burns helped van Buuren, Oakenfold, and Schulz in the production of their songs and compilations. He was also commissioned for remixes on singles by Alanis Morissette, GusGus, and Nikka Costa. He produced an album known as Femmes Fatales — The 12 Leading Ladies of Electronica, which contained songs by artists such as Jess, Collette, Mea, and his sister Andrea Burns, which was released by Universal Records. His music has also been featured on several commercials and web videos for brands such as SCION, Revlon, and Dell.

== Film and television ==
Burns wrote songs for films and television shows in the early 2000s, including ESPN's first reality show Beg, Borrow and Deal, where he wrote the theme song and scores for two seasons. He went on to write the theme song for ESPN's Jim Rome is Burning, which ran for eight years. He has been a music supervisor on 35 feature films and over 100 TV episodes, which include Setup, Freelancers, Fire with Fire, The Frozen Ground, and Empire State, The Prince, Broken City, and Gotti. In 2020, Mike Burns directed the feature film Out of Death starring Bruce Willis and Jaime King, followed by Wrong Place - also starring Willis - in 2022.
