= Aisher =

Aisher is a surname. Notable people with the surname include:

- Bruce Aisher, British music producer, journalist, and lecturer
- Robin Aisher (1934–2023), British sailor

== See also ==
- Asher (name)
