= Wrong Place =

2022 American film by Mike Burns

- Official release poster
- Directed by: Mike Burns
- Written by: Bill Lawrence
- Produced by: Randall Emmett; George Furla; Ceasar Richbow; Mark Stewart; Chad A. Verdi
- Starring: Ashley Greene Khoury; Bruce Willis
- Cinematography: Peter Holland
- Edited by: Jake Buchheit
- Music by: Burnsi
- Production companies: 5 Star Films; SSS Entertainment
- Distributed by: Vertical Entertainment
- Release date: July 15, 2022
- Running time: 96 minutes
- Country: United States
- Language: English
- Box office: $98,942

Wrong Place is a 2022 American action film directed by Mike Burns, from a script from Bill Lawrence, and produced by Randall Emmett and George Furla. It stars Ashley Greene Khoury and Bruce Willis.

Wrong Place was released by Vertical Entertainment in limited theaters and VOD on July 15, 2022, followed by its release on DVD and Blu-ray on September 20, 2022.

== Premise ==
The film tells the story of a methamphetamine cook who hunts down a small-town former police chief in an effort to prevent the man from delivering eyewitness testimony against his family.

== Cast ==
- Bruce Willis as Frank Richards
- Ashley Greene Khoury as Chloe Richards
- Michael Sirow as Jake Brown
- Texas Battle as Captain East
- Stacey Danger as Tammy
- Massi Furlan as Virgil Brown

== Production ==
In 2021, Bruce Willis signed on to star in the action film Wrong Place, with filming commencing later that year. In March 2022, the film's director Mike Burns, who previously directed another Bruce Willis film Out of Death, said, "before filming commenced on Wrong Place in 2021, I asked one of Willis's associates how the actor felt and was told he was much better than last year. I took the associates' word for it, but soon realized that Willis was worse. After I finished filming, I said, 'I'm done. I won't make another movie with Bruce Willis.' I'm relieved that he's on vacation." Wrong Place is one of the last films to star Willis, who retired from acting because he was diagnosed with frontotemporal dementia.

== Release ==
Wrong Place was released by Vertical Entertainment in limited theaters and VOD on July 15, 2022, followed by its release on DVD and Blu-ray on September 20, 2022.

=== Box office ===
As of October 1, 2024, Wrong Place grossed $98,942 in Hungary, Turkey, Portugal, and the United Arab Emirates.

=== Critical response ===
On the review aggregator website Rotten Tomatoes, 0% of 6 critics' reviews are positive, with an average rating of 2.4/10.

Brian Orndorf, of Blu-ray.com, gave a negative review, writing "Wrong Place is as worthless and tiresome as Out of Death, and let's hope the production team doesn't make this a yearly event." Julian Roman, of MovieWeb, also gave a negative review, saying the film had an "absurd plot, terrible script, and amateurish direction." Maxwell Rabb, of Chicago Reader, gave a negative review, saying "Wrong Place is a convoluted mess that struggles to connect disjunctive plot points as they dawdle their way to the movie's inevitable conclusion". Tara McNamara, of Common Sense Media, awarded the film one star out of five, writing "throwaway action films like this one are known for featuring a former but memorable tough guy marquee name, a forgettable plot, low production budget, and a high weapon count".
