= Doof (musician) =

- Also known as: Nicholas Barber
- Born: 31 August 1968 (age 58); England
- Genres: Psychedelic trance, Goa trance, ambient, drone
- Years active: 1993–present

Nicholas Barber (born 31 August 1968), better known by the stage name Doof, is a British, London-based psychedelic trance musician.

Doof's first official release was in 1993 with NovaMute, the dance label run by Mute Records, a three-track EP titled "Disposable Hymns to the Infinite". It was through Novamute label-mates Juno Reactor and Ben Watkins that Doof was first introduced to producer Youth (of Killing Joke/ Brilliant), Simon Posford, also known as Hallucinogen, and the Dragonfly Records label.

Doof went on to release "Double Dragons" as a 12" with Dragonfly in 1994, and to produce a series of tracks in partnership with Simon Posford, including "Let's Turn On", "Born Again" and "Angelic Particles". It was through his friendship with Simon Posford that Doof was introduced to Raja Ram (Shpongle/The Infinity Project/Quintessence) who later that year would start the trance label T.I.P Records. Doof's "Let's Turn On" (co-produced with Simon Posford) became the second T.I.P 12" release. This was followed in 1995 by another 12" for T.I.P (Angelina/Weird Karma), the Born Again EP on Matsuri and another 12" for Dragonfly ("Youth of the Galaxy"). 1995 also saw numerous Doof remixes, including tracks by Hallucinogen and The Infinity Project.

In 1996, the first Doof album Let's Turn On was released on T.I.P. Records, and went on to become one of the defining albums of the early psy-trance sound. It was subsequently re-released in 2000 by Twisted Records, who also released the second Doof album It's About Time the same year. During this time Doof travelled extensively performing live sets all over the globe including numerous appearances across Europe, in the U.S., South America and Japan.

In 2001, he teamed up with friends Celli Firmi (Earthling/Soundaholix) and Mexican DJ and promoter Xavier Fux (Zulu Lounge) to collaborate on the psy-house project Vatos Locos. The first Vatos Locos album (Welcome to the Barrio) was released later that year by Sony Music. The second album, Attack and Release, went out in 2004 with Dragonfly Records. It was around this time that Doof began to grow disillusioned with the commercial and musical direction that the psy-trance scene was taking, and started to explore other avenues of musical expression. He is also one half of downtempo electronica project Third Ear Audio with Celli Firmi, and as a singer/songwriter is recording acoustic songs as Nick Barber. In 2008, he released an acoustic album called Clear Blue Sky under his own name. This was followed by a second album of songs called Seeds.

In 2010 he produced a psy-dub album "Love Dub So" released by Dubmission Records.

In April 2015, Let's Turn On was re-released by DAT Records in a remastered and expanded double CD version, featuring vintage alternate mixes of all the original tracks. One reviewer nominated it "the greatest Goa trance album of all time".

In early 2015, he started work as composer for the soundtrack of Bruce Parry's forthcoming documentary Quest. The film was eventually released under the title Tawai, A Voice from the Forest in September 2017. The original soundtrack album with music by Barber was also released at the same time.

== Discography ==
As Doof:

- Disposable Hymns to the Infinite (12") (NovaMute 1993)
- Double Dragons (12") (Dragonfly Records 1994)
- Let's Turn On (12") (TIP Records 1994)
- Angelina/Weird Karma (12") (TIP Records 1995)
- Born Again E.P. (12") (Matsuri Productions 1995)
- Youth of the Galaxy (12") (Dragonfly Records 1995)
- Let's Turn On (album) (TIP Records 1996)
- Mars Needs Women Remix/Destination Bom (12") (TIP Records 1996)
- It's About Time (album) (Twisted Records 2000)
- Chemical Energy (from Demented compilation on Twisted Records 2000)
- High on Mount Kailash (TIP World 2000)
- Love Dub So (Dubmission Records 2010)

As Nick Barber:

- Clear Blue Sky (Astral Phonographic 2008)
- Seeds (Astral Phonographic 2014)
- Tawai, A Voice from the Forest, original soundtrack album (Quest Unlimited 2017)
