= Moment of Truth (Man with No Name album) =

Moment of Truth is a Goa trance album by Man With No Name originally released in 1996.

The album was ranked as the 26th best album of 1996 by Muzik Magazine

Professional ratings
Review scores
Source	Rating
Muzik	5/5 stars

== Track listing ==
1.	Moment of Truth	6:56
2.	Floor-essence (Dayglo Mix)	6:06
3.	Subterfuge	5:52
4.	Evolution	6:47
5.	Azymuth	7:55
6.	Low Commotion	6:52
7.	Skydiving	6:05
8.	Dawn Chorus	6:30
9.	Cairo	7:07
10.	Sugar Rush (Refined Mix)	6:08
11.	Cosmic Echoes	6:45
