= Return to the Source =

London-based Goa trance club

Return to the Source (RTTS) was a London-based Goa trance club and offshoot record label run by partners Chris Decker, Mark Allen, Janice Duncan and Phil Ross. Along with the recurring Escape from Samsara party, which also had a monthly Friday night slot at The Fridge in the mid-1990s, it was an early mainstay of trance in its underground days and through its breakout in the late 1990s. According to Allmusic, its "compilation series of the best trance music on the scene...brought Goa trance to the mainstream hordes".

On Fri 1 August 2014, the four partners got together for a 21st Anniversary Reunion Party at Electric, Brixton (formerly The Fridge) with many of the artists who played at the early parties and appeared on albums including Tsuyoshi Suzuki, Mark Allen, Man With No Name (Martin Freeland), Dr Alex Paterson (The Orb), Mixmaster Morris.

The beginning of the club was documented by music journalist Ian Gittins in the book that accompanied the first Return to the Source compilation 'Deep Trance and Ritual Beats' (1995). At page 8, Gittins writes:

Chris Deckker organised a party in Amsterdam on New Year's Eve 1992, which he called Return to the Source. Chris was a traveller, voyaging with Leyolah Antara from their native Australia where they'd spent time investigating shamen and the power of ritual. They would invite visiting shamen to lead rituals, which would culminate in trance-dance abandon. They moved to Amsterdam and started techno group, Sushumna. "Sushumna is a Sanskrit word which means the merging of dualities," explains Chris.

The Deckkers soon moved to London, drawn by its techno scene, and events quickened apace. A friend of Chris and Antara's, Sara Sol, was languishing in jail in India, and the couple wanted to hold a party to raise money for her. George Saunders, best known as musician Solar Quest and a cool underground networker introduced Chris to Phil Ross and Janice Duncan, promoters at North London's Dome venue, who agreed to stage the event. The Free Sol party was a success, and Chris, Phil, Janice and DJ Mark Allen decided to run a regular club, called Return to the Source.

Other like minded souls became involved. All were travellers, most had experienced the life-affirming qualities of Goa. DJs Mark Allen and Tsuyoshi Suzuki had been transformed by Goa. Jules and Jason, old college friends from Brighton had met by chance in Goa and decided to become painters/artists. All were linked into the New Age/Goa network and craving an outlet for their creative energies. All will tell you their story later in their own words.

This emphasis on spirituality and ritual was carried on at the RTTS events, which were opened with a ceremony involving tribal instruments brought along by club-goers (who were offered a discounted entry fee for doing so).

The Source (as it became known) flourished alongside the musical genre of Goa trance and its successor psychedelic trance running monthly club nights or 'parties' at The Rocket in North London's Holloway Road, Brixton's Fridge, Bagley's in Kings Cross and a number of larger events at Brixton Academy...the last one of which was in 2002.

The Source produced 18 compilation albums of upbeat trance and more downtempo ambient music, as well as the 'Deck Wizards' series of DJ mix compilation CDs from Source residents and regular's including Mark Allen, Tsuyoshi Suzuki, Chris 'Chrisbo' Smith. A series of chilled albums entitled Ambient Meditations included mixes from Mark Allen, Dr Alex Paterson (The Orb), Youth (Martin Glover) and Mixmaster Morris.

"In September 1996, the promoter John Emmanuel Gartmann held America's first psychedelic trance rave Return to the Source -- a now legendary party at the Liberty Science Center in Jersey City," wrote Simon Reynolds in The New York Times.

== Ambient Meditations series ==
A series of four mix albums was released on the Return to the Source label:

- Ambient Meditations 1 mixed by Mark Allen (1998)
- Ambient Meditations 2 mixed by Dr Alex Paterson (The Orb) (1999)
- Ambient Meditations 3 mixed by Youth (2000)
- Ambient Mediations 4: God Bless the Chilled mixed by Mixmaster Morris (2002)
