= A Voyage into Trance =

A Voyage Into Trance
- 2001 re-release cover

Remix album by Paul Oakenfold
- Released: 1995 (original); 4 March 2001 (re-release)
- Genre: Goa trance
- Label: Hypnotic

Professional ratings
Review scores
Source	Rating
Allmusic	4/5 stars

A Voyage into Trance is a DJ mix album by British producer and DJ Paul Oakenfold. The album was originally released in 1995 and was soon out of print, but its popularity meant it was re-released in March 2001 with an alternative surround sound mix paired with immersive visuals. Allmusic said the album included an "immaculately assembled collection of dance tracks" and rated the album four out of five stars.

== Track listing ==
1. Trancemission - Genetic

2. Sly-Ed - Man with No Name

3. The Rezistor - Dynamix

4. Teleport - Man with No Name

5. Superbooster - The Infinity Project

6. Wicked Warp - Mandra Gora

7. Voyager III (Voodoo Remix) - Prana

8. New Moon- Ayahusca

9. Feeling Weird - The Infinity Project

10. Wizard - Slinky Wizard

11. Fat Buddha - Black Sun

12. LSD - Hallucinogen

Track 3 is incorrectly listed as 'Total Eclipse - Aliens'. It is actually 'Dynamix - The Rezistor'. The credits for this track have been taken from Order Odonata Vol. 1 which is the original appearance of this track. Track 10 is incorrectly listed as 'Slinky Wizard'. Both of these errors have been carried forward onto various releases of this Album in the subsequent years.

== DVD ==
The Album was also released as a DVD with remixed 5.1 surround sound. The DVD contains a pair of 3D glasses to view the movie with. The 3D glasses are ChromaDepth which can create the illusion of 3 Dimensions through the color spectrum. The visuals are created by Yo Suzuki, Love Mushroom Studio.
