= Flying High (album) =

Studio album by the Irresistible Force
- Released: 1992
- Genre: Ambient
- Length: 74:15
- Label: Instinct
- Producer: Mixmaster Morris

The Irresistible Force chronology
| Flying High (1992) | Dreamfish (1993) |

Professional ratings
Review scores
| Source | Rating |
|---|---|
| AllMusic | 5/5 stars |

Flying High is the debut studio album by the Irresistible Force. It was released in 1992 through Instinct Records.

== Track listing ==
All music is composed by Mixmaster Morris

| No. | Title | Length |
|---|---|---|
| 1. | "Spiritual High" | 7:47 |
| 2. | "Sky High" | 12:11 |
| 3. | "Flying High" | 15:33 |
| 4. | "High Frequency" | 9:42 |
| 5. | "Symphony in E" | 8:47 |
| 6. | "Mountain High" (live) | 20:15 |

== Personnel ==
- Taylor Deupree – design
- Mixmaster Morris – instruments, arrangement, production
