= Global Chillage =

Studio album by The Irresistible Force
- Released: 1994
- Genre: Ambient, IDM
- Length: 65:09
- Label: Rising High
- Producer: Mixmaster Morris

The Irresistible Force chronology
Dreamfish (1992)	Global Chillage (1994)	It's Tomorrow Already (1998)

Global Chillage is the second album by the Irresistible Force. It was released in 1994.

== Critical reception ==
Professional ratings
Review scores
Source	Rating
AllMusic	4/5 stars
Entertainment Weekly	B

The Times called the album a classic of the ambient genre, writing that "it may sound random, but [the] gently drifting patchworks of synthesized sound and percussion have careful structures that leave little to chance." The Orange County Register concluded that "except for 'Sunstroke' and 'Waveform', the seven tracks here (most of which clock in at around 10 minutes) come across as random noises."

== Track listing ==
All music is composed by Mixmaster Morris

No.	Title	Length
1.	"Natural Frequency"	14:06
2.	"Downstream"	10:05
3.	"Moonrise"	9:41
4.	"Sunstroke"	8:25
5.	"Snowstorm"	8:39
6.	"Waveform"	12:00
7.	"Manifesto"	2:13

== Personnel ==
- Jon Black – design
- Adrian Harrow – engineering
- Chris Levine – cover art
- Mixmaster Morris – instruments, arrangement, production
- Nimbus – mastering
