= Perfecto Fluoro =

Remix album (DJ mix) by Paul Oakenfold
- Released: 28 October 1996
- Recorded: 1996 (mixed)
- Genres: Electronica, Goa trance, Hard trance, progressive trance, art pop
- Labels: Perfecto Records, Warner Music UK
- Producer: Paul Oakenfold

Paul Oakenfold chronology
The Goa Mix (1995)	Perfecto Fluoro (1996)	Global Underground: Live in Oslo (1997)

Professional ratings
Review scores
Source	Rating
AllMusic	3/5 stars
Style Review	(very favourable)

Perfecto Fluoro is the fifth DJ mix album by British electronic producer and disc jockey Paul Oakenfold, released in 1996 on Oakenfold's label Perfecto Records, then a subsidiary of Warner Music UK who are also credited. Recorded eighteen months after the Oakenfold's ground breaking Goa Mix (1994), notable for its pioneering of goa trance and usage of film music, Perfecto Fluoro utilizes the same "epic" approach and feel, with liberal use of excerpts from film soundtracks, which is referred to in the album's liner notes track listing which lists not only track, artist and label, but also which film a song appears in, where relevant. There are also several excerpts of film dialogue sampled on some of the tracks; for instance, "Teleport" by Man With No Name contains some of Jeff Goldblum's dialogue extolling the virtues of teleportation from The Fly.

The album is named after Oakenfold's record label Perfecto Fluoro, an offshoot of his Perfecto Records label which one biography referred to as "the label of choice in the mid-nineties for the harder, trippier Goa trance sound." The album features singles from the label, namely the aforementioned "Teleport", alongside "We're not Alone", "Jungle High", "Moon", "If I Could Fly", "New Kicks", "Prophase", "Atlantis" and "Lost in Love", which were all released as singles on the label. The album also contains material from the parent label, Perfecto Records, who released the album.

The album was named the number 1 "essential dance collection" of Boston Beat during 1996 alongside Jamiroquai's Travelling Without Moving.

== Track listing ==
=== Disc 1 ===
1. H.H.C. - We're Not Alone
2. Ryuichi Sakamoto - Merry Christmas Mr. Lawrence (from the film Merry Christmas, Mr. Lawrence)
3. Y-Traxx - Mystery Land
4. Red Sun - This Love
5. Ryuichi Sakamoto - Little Buddha (from the film Little Buddha)
6. Man With No Name - Teleport
7. Terrorvision - Conspiracy
8. Man With No Name - Sugar Rush
9. Éric Serra - Cute Name (from the film Léon: The Professional)
10. State of Emergency - Banks of Babylon
11. Juno Reactor - Jungle High
12. Ennio Morricone - Miserere (from the film The Mission)
13. Virus - Moon
14. Grace - If I Could Fly
15. Our House - Floor Space

=== Disc 2 ===
1. Zbigniew Preisner - Craven Leaves (from the film Secret Garden)
2. Johann - New Kicks
3. Samuel Barber - Adagio for Strings
4. Astral Projection - Kabalah
5. Wojciech Kilar - Love Remembered (from the film Bram Stoker's Dracula)
6. Transa - Prophase
7. Section X - Atlantis
8. Björk & David Arnold - Play Dead (from the film Young Americans)
9. Ozaka Oz - Real Nightmare
10. Legend B - Lost in Love
11. Jamie Myerson - Revisions
