= Journeys by Stadium DJ =

Remix album by Paul Oakenfold
- Released: 1994
- Genre: Goa trance
- Label: Moonshine Music

Journeys by Stadium DJ is a remix Album by Paul Oakenfold. Released in 1994, the album is a more pop-oriented collection than Oakenfold's later mix discs, including several vocal tracks, but John Bush of Allmusic stated the album "showcases Oakenfold's seamless mixing ability to good effect."

Professional ratings
Review scores
Source	Rating
Allmusic	4/5 stars

== Track listing ==
1. "Extasia" (4:48)
2. "Wow Mr. Yogi!" (F.A.M. Tranceport Mix) (5:49)
3. "Lemon" (Perfecto Remix) (7:19)
4. "Just Let It Go" (1:24)
5. "Hablando" (4:24)
6. "Body Baby" (3:24)
7. "Now" (3:51)
8. "Not Over Yet" (4:34)
9. "I Can't Take Your Love" (2:03)
10. "Timeless Land" (Leftfield Vocal Mix) (2:42)
11. "The Snake" (6:34)
12. "Dreams" (5:28)
13. "Little Bullet" (6:50)
14. "Possible Worlds" (3:11)
15. "LSD" (5:53)
