= Interstate (duo) =

American musical duo

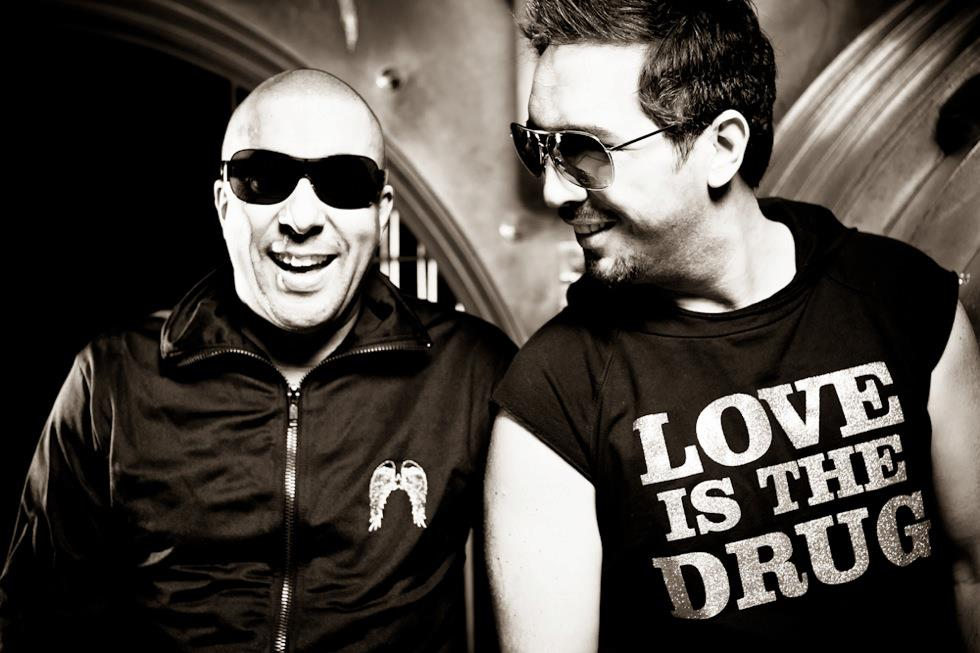
- Interstate in 2008

Background information
- Origin: Miami Beach/South London
- Genres: Trance, progressive trance
- Years active: 2000–2008
- Labels: Armada, Vandit, System Recordings
- Members: Mike Burns; Mark Lewis
- Website: interstatedjs.com

Interstate is a Los Angeles–based electronic music production duo made up of Mike Burns and Mark Lewis.

In 2005 they were signed to a 3-track deal to Netherlands-based label Armada Music. Their breakthrough single "I Found U" was later featured on Paul Oakenfold's Grammy nominated Creamfields compilation. They have had releases on Vandit Records as well as System Recordings in the US.

== Career ==
In 2000, a mutual friend of Burns introduced the two, and their first experiment together, "Infrared", landed on Paul Oakenfold's Underground Sound of America E.P.

In 2005 they released 'I found U,' the first of three singles on Armada Music. That same year Interstate also teamed up with Markus Schulz, co-producing "Peaches N Cream," a featured track off Schulz' debut artist album. The following year, they released their second single on Armada called "Remember Me." Both tracks feature vocalist Colleen Kelly.

Collectively their releases have been licensed to over 80 trance music compilations, including Paul Oakenfold's Grammy nominated Creamfields album.

Their more recent release "Love Freak" was signed to a worldwide Revlon campaign featuring Jessica Biel, while their newest work "Gforce" has been licensed for a worldwide Campaign for Dell Computers new laptop for DJs.

== Discography ==
=== Original Tracks ===
- Junkie (N-Vision Remix) [Vandit, 2010]
- Junkie (2010 Mix) [Vandit, 2010]
- Junkie (Heatbeat Remix) [Vandit, 2010]
- Waiting (Verdugo Brothers Remix) [Unreleased]
- Love Freak (Original Mix) [System Recordings, 2010]
- Love Freak (Moldan & Isma-Ae remix) [System Recordings, 2010]
- Love Freak (Interstate vs. Cerf and Mitiska Remix) [System Recordings, 2010]
- Love Freak (DJ Reza & Kid Krazzy Remix) [System Recordings, 2010]
- Love Freak (Jan Van Lier Remix) [System Recordings, 2010]
- Love Freak (George Acosta Remix) [System Recordings, 2010]
- Love Freak (IV Legend Remix) [System Recordings, 2010]
- Remember Me (Original Mix) [Armada, 2006]
- Remember Me (Terry Bones Remix) [Armada, 2006]
- Remember Me (Shawn Mitiska & Tyler Michaud Remix) [Armada 2006]
- Remember Me (Carlo Lio & Nathan Barato Remix) [Unreleased]
- I Found You (Original Mix) [Armada, 2005]
- I Found You (Harry Lemon Remix) [Armada 2005]
- I Found You (Perry O'Neil Remix) [Armada 2005]
- I Found You (Armin Van Buuren Intro Edit)
- Release [Unreleased – featured on band's MySpace at one time]

=== Remixes ===
- Yanni: Strong In Love (Interstate Remix) [Unreleased]
- Casey Desmond- Rendezvous (Interstate Remix) [Unreleased]
- Keo Nozari- Close Enough (Interstate Remix) [Armada, 2007]
- Jan Johnston- Transparent (Interstate Remix) [2005]
