= It's Tomorrow Already =

Studio album by The Irresistible Force
- Released: 21 September 1998
- Genre: Ambient, IDM
- Length: 63:31
- Label: Ninja Tune
- Producer: Mixmaster Morris

The Irresistible Force chronology
Global Chillage (1994)	It's Tomorrow Already (1998)

It's Tomorrow Already is the third album by The Irresistible Force, released on 21 September 1998, through Ninja Tune.

== Critical reception ==
Professional ratings
Review scores
Source	Rating
AllMusic	4/5 stars
Mixmag	4/5 stars
Muzik	3/5 stars
Pitchfork	6.2/10
Q	4/5 stars
Uncut	4/5 stars

Sean Cooper of AllMusic wrote that It's Tomorrow Already retains "the same fusion of warm synths, pattery rhythms, and drug-aligned voiceovers" as previous Irresistible Force albums, "but the loose organicism of Ninja-styled downtempo ... makes a nice addition to the mix."

== Track listing ==
All music is composed by Mixmaster Morris.

No.	Title	Length
1.	"Power"	8:36
2.	"The Lie-In King"	7:43
3.	"Nepalese Bliss"	7:46
4.	"12 O'Clock"	8:14
5.	"Another Tomorrow"	6:35
6.	"Fish Dances"	9:28
7.	"Playing Around with Sound"	6:19
8.	"It's Tomorrow Already"	8:50

== Personnel ==
- John Friendly – engineering
- Gwen Jamois – engineering
- Mixmaster Morris – instruments, arrangement, production
- David Vallade – illustrations
- Voda – engineering
