= Mystery Land (song) =

1995 song by Y-Traxx

Single by Y-Traxx

from the album Kiss The Sound
- Released: 2003
- Recorded: 1995

"Mystery Land" is a song by Y-Traxx. It was originally released as a B-side on the 1995 EP Kiss The Sound. It went on to become the title track of the 1997 EP Mystery Land, after being featured on Paul Oakenfold's 1996 mix album Perfecto Fluoro.

The Neve remix of it made #70 on the UK Singles Chart.
