= Mixmaster Morris =

English DJ and musician

- Born: Morris Gould; 30 December 1960 (age 65); Brighton, England
- Genres: Electronica, ambient, downtempo, trip hop
- Occupations: Producer, DJ
- Years active: 1987–present
- Labels: Rising High, Instinct, FAX +49-69/450464, Ninja Tune

Mixmaster Morris (born Morris Gould; 30 December 1960) is an English electronica DJ and underground musician who has also recorded as The Irresistible Force. His work in the 1990s blended ambient music and chill-out influences with UK dance styles.

== Life and career ==
Morris Gould was born in Brighton, Sussex, England, but grew up in Lincolnshire and was educated at Millfield in Somerset, and King's College London. At 15 he founded a punk rock band, The Ripchords, whose sole release, an eponymous EP with four tracks, was championed by the BBC Radio One DJ John Peel. After leaving university, he began working as a DJ in 1985 with his "Mongolian Hip Hop Show" on pirate radio station Network 21 in London – the handle Mixmaster Morris was suggested by the station director. After a year of managing a club called "The Gift" in New Cross, which had been founded by Keith Gallagher and named after a Velvet Underground song, Morris began releasing material as The Irresistible Force in 1987 in collaboration with singer-songwriter Des de Moor. He became involved with the emerging UK acid house scene, after organising Madhouse at The Fridge, Brixton in 1988 – which was the subject of a piece by Peel in The Observer.

A show with the band Psychic TV led to him becoming full-time DJ with The Shamen, and touring with them on their 'Synergy' tours for nearly two years.

The first release as The Irresistible Force was the single, "I Want To" (1988), but success came with the first album, Flying High, released in 1992 on Rising High Records. In 1994, Morris released the second album Global Chillage which featured a holographic sleeve, and was released in the US on Astralwerks. After a period of legal problems, the third album It's Tomorrow Already came out on Ninja Tune.

In 1990, he made one of the first chillout compilations, Give Peace a Dance 2: The Ambient Collection for the Campaign for Nuclear Disarmament, followed by the series Chillout or Die for Rising High Records. A mix tape for Mixmag shared with Alex Patterson was also released as a CD. The Morning After became his first major-label mix album, followed by Abstract Funk Theory for Obsessive.

Through the 1990s he was a regular DJ in the chill out room at Return to the Source parties in London, around the UK and abroad. In 2003 he released the mix CD God Bless the Chilled for the Return to the Source Ambient Meditations series.

He has produced many remixes since 1985, including Coldcut's "Autumn Leaves". This remix was nominated by Norman Cook as his favourite chillout track on BBC Television. His mix for INXS was a Top 20 hit in the UK. Other early remixes were of Lloyd Cole, Dave Howard Singers, Bang Bang Machine, Stump, Higher Intelligence Agency, Sven Väth and Rising High Collective.

In the early 1990s his key residencies were alongside the Detroit masters at Lost, Megatripolis at London's Heaven, and also the Tribal Gathering parties. He became known for wearing holographic suits, produced by the company Spacetime, which he modelled for Vogue magazine. Throughout the decade, Morris wrote about electronic music for the NME, Mixmag, and i-D. He was resident on Kiss FM for several years, and then a regular on Solid Steel, the Ninja Tune syndicated radio show. He made his film debut in Modulations (Caipirinha Films), and his music was used in a number of other films including Groove and Hey Happy.

Morris has played in over fifty countries at nightclubs and parties, and particularly music festivals such as the Full Moon parties in the Mojave Desert, Glastonbury Festival, Rainbow 2000 and Mother SOS in Japan, Chillits in Northern California, and Berlin's Love Parade. He also ran the downtempo night Nubient in Brixton. In 1995, he played at the first The Big Chill festival, and then became a resident for the next 16 years.

He also collaborated with the German musician Pete Namlook under the name Dreamfish, recording two albums. Also with SF-based musician Jonah Sharp and Haruomi Hosono of Yellow Magic Orchestra he made the album Quiet Logic for the Japanese label Daisyworld.

In 1998 he joined the UK's Ninja Tune record label, with whom he toured as a DJ and made three releases. 1999 saw him win 'Best Chillout DJ' at the Ibiza DJ Awards at Pacha, Ibiza, and in 2001 he won the title for a second time, becoming the first DJ to achieve this. He has appeared in many lists of the world's top DJ's including the Ministry of Sound book The Annual and 2003's DJs by Lopez, and URB Magazine's Top 100 DJ list. Morris records regular radio shows for the Japanese internet radio station Samurai FM. In 2006 he started a new club at the Big Chill House in Kings Cross, London, and did a guest mix for BBC Radio 1's The Blue Room show. His essay about jazz was published in the book, Crossfade, and he made a one-off appearance reading it aloud.

In March 2007, together with Coldcut, he organised a tribute show to the writer and philosopher Robert Anton Wilson, which they performed at the Queen Elizabeth Hall. He also played in Goa for the first time with The Big Chill, and started a new residency at The Prince in Brixton. In May 2008 Morris undertook an ambient mix on BBC Radio 1, and put a The Irresistible Force band together to play at The Big Chill festival. In 2009, he compiled a podcast for Tate Britain to accompany their Altermodern exhibition, and opened a new AV night called MMMTV in Camden. The mix CD, Calm Down My Selector was released in January by Wakyo Records, and he made a tour of Japan to promote it.

In 2010, he won another Ibiza DJ Award, for the third time. In October that year, he was announced as Head of A+R for Apollo Records. 2011 saw him rejoin Bestival as part of their "Ambient Forest" team.

2017 saw Morris continue to stay at the top of the psybient/downtempo movement and charts, especially Mixcloud where he held top positions in most categories relating to ambient music for the full year. 2017 also saw the return of Mixmaster Morris with his acclaimed release "Kira Kira", a lush soundscape that was received well by many publications and listeners and earned a spot in "Extreme Chill's" top twenty of 2017 along with releases by Brian Eno and Steve Roach.

== Discography ==
- Flying High (Rising High, 1992)
- Global Chillage (Rising High, 1994)
- It's Tomorrow Already (Ninja Tune, 1998)
- Kira Kira (Liquid Sound Design, 2017)

== See also ==
- List of ambient music artists

== General references ==
- Gill, John (1995). Queer Noises: Male and Female Homosexuality in Twentieth Century Music. U of Minnesota Press. ISBN 978-0-8166-2719-6.
- Prendergast, Mark J. (2000). The Ambient Century. Bloomsbury. ISBN 978-1-58234-134-7.
- Smith, Richard (1995). Seduced and Abandoned: Essays on Gay Men and Popular Music. Cassell. ISBN 978-0-304-33343-1.
- Toop, David (1995). Ocean of Sound: Aether Talk, Ambient Sound and Imaginary Worlds. Serpent's Tail. ISBN 978-1-85242-382-7.
