= Perfecto Presents: Travelling =

Remix album by Paul Oakenfold
- Released: 2000
- Genre: Electronic
- Label: Perfecto Mushroom Records

Perfecto Presents: Travelling is a mix album by Paul Oakenfold.

Released in 2000, it reached number 12 on the UK Compilation Chart, and launched the Perfecto Presents series, which continued with Perfecto Presents: Another World later in the year.

== Track listing ==
=== Disc 1 ===
1. Velvet Girl - "Velvet" (Chiller Twist Cosmosis Remix) (7:50)
2. Timo Maas - "Ubik" (The Dance Remix) (5:41)
3. Jazzy M - "Jazzin' the Way You Know" (Menage a Trois Remix) (4:43)
4. Dave Kane - "Clarkness" (Slacker Remix) (6:21)
5. Tone Depth - "Point 7" (5:55)
6. Altitude - "Night Stalker" (5:41)
7. Leama - "Melodica" (10:28)
8. Bunker - "Descent" (6:01)
9. Planet Perfecto - "Bullet in the Gun 2000" (Rabbit in the Moon Mix) (5:09)
10. Bullitt - "Cried to Dream" (Max Graham Remix) (10:01)
11. Max Graham - "Bar None" (6:02)

=== Disc 2 ===
1. Brancaccio & Aisher - "Darker" (Reset the Breaks Mix) (6:47)
2. PMT - "Gyromancer" (False Prophet Mix) (5:42)
3. Azzido da Bass - "Dooms Night" (Timo Maas Remix) (5:24)
4. Lyric - "Over Emotion" (5:32)
5. The Utah Saints - "Lost Vagueness" (Oliver Lieb Vocal Remix) (5:42)
6. Mekka - "Diamondback" (6:04)
7. Jan Johnston - "Flesh" (Tiësto Remix) (6:52)
8. Blackwatch - "North Sky" (6:16)
9. Goldenscan - "Sunrise" (DJ Tiësto Remix) (5:15)
10. Delerium - "Silence" (DJ Tiësto in Search of Sunrise Remix) (10:12)
11. Element Four - "Big Brother" (9:58)

== Charts ==
Chart performance for Perfecto Presents: Travelling
Chart (2000)	Peak position
Australian Albums (ARIA)	75
UK Compilations (OCC)	12

== Certifications ==
Certifications for Perfecto Presents: Travelling
Region	Certification	Certified units/sales
Australia (ARIA)	Gold	35,000^{^}
^{^} Shipments figures based on certification alone.
