= Mark Allen (DJ) =

British DJ

Mark Allen is a British psychedelic trance DJ and record producer.

Allen is one of the pioneers of the Goa trance movement. He first got into psychedelic dance music in 1991, during his first visit to Goa, India. Allen collaborated with the producer Tim Healey in a band called Quirk. In 1994, he started organising parties in a London-based club Return to the Source. With the other club partners Chris Deckker, Phil Ross and Janice Duncan, he toured across the United Kingdom, United States, Europe, Japan and Israel until 2001.

== Discography ==
=== As Mark Allen ===
- 1995 – Brainforest – Chaos Unlimited
- 1995 – Storming Heaven – Chaos Unlimited
- 1995 – Aumniscience – Chaos Unlimited
- 1996 – Trancentral Five – A Sonic Initiation – Kickin Records
- 1996 – Trancentral – A Sonic Initiation – Kickin Records
- 1996 – Microtropix – Chaos Unlimited
- 1996 – Resplendent Divergence – Chaos Unlimited
- 1996 – DJ Tsuyoshi Suzuki* / DJ Mark Allen* – Deck Wizards – Goa Trance Mix – Cyber Production
- 1996 – Deck Wizards – Psychedelic Trance Mix – Psychic Deli
- 1997 – Shamanic Trance – Psiberfunk Mix By Mark Allen – Return to the Source
- 1999 – Inventive Steps – U.S.T.A
- 2000 – Explorations – Electric Safari Mix – Return to the Source
- 2002 – Most Wanted Presents Mark Allen: Open Air – Ware – Phonokol

=== As Quirk ===
- 1997 – Dimension Disco / Cognitive Dissidents – Krembo Records
- 1997 – Dance with the Devil E.P. – Matsuri Productions
- 1998 – Machina Electrica & Fornax Chemica – Matsuri Productions
- 1998 – Shark Matter EP – Matsuri Productions
- 1999 – Wah Wah Wah E.P. – Matsuri Productions
- 1999 – Quality Control – Matsuri Productions
- 1999 – Sale of the Century / Cognitive Dissidents – Not on Label
- 2000 – Soft Focus – Automatic Records
- 2000 – Quirk / Electric Tease – Explorations – Return to the Source
- 2001 – Yebo – Automatic Records
- 2001 – Tribodelic – Transient Records
- 2002 – The Sound – Plusquam Records
