= Bruce Aisher =

English music producer, journalist and lecturer

- Occupation(s): Music producer, music technology journalist, lecturer
- Member of: Brancaccio & Aisher
- Website: www.bruceaisher.com

Bruce Aisher is an English music producer, music technology journalist and lecturer. As one half of the duo Brancaccio & Aisher, he has had club hits for labels including Bedrock, Parlophone and his own Player One Records. Brancaccio & Aisher are known for "It's Gonna Be... (A Lovely Day)" which reached No. 1 in the US Billboard Club Chart and became a UK Top 40 hit. Aisher first began his production career at Cheeky Records with producer Rollo, which led to him working on Dido's platinum-selling No Angel album, on which contributed synthesizer effects and keyboards. Aisher also records and remixes under the alias of Gutterstylz.

== See also ==
- List of artists who reached number one on the U.S. dance chart
