= Out of Death =

2021 action film directed by Mike Burns

- Theatrical release poster
- Directed by: Mike Burns
- Written by: Bill Lawrence
- Produced by: Randall Emmett; George Furla; Chad A. Verdi; Luillo Ruiz; Shaun Sanghani
- Starring: Jaime King; Bruce Willis; Kelly Greyson; Mike Burns
- Cinematography: Peter Holland
- Edited by: R.J. Cooper
- Music by: Jacob Bunton; Mike Burns
- Production companies: Emmett/Furla Oasis; SSS Entertainment; The Pimienta Film Co.
- Distributed by: Vertical Entertainment
- Release date: July 16, 2021 (United States)
- Running time: 96 minutes
- Country: United States
- Language: English
- Box office: $95,813

Out of Death is a 2021 American action thriller film directed by Mike Burns and starring Bruce Willis and Jaime King.

== Plot ==
Photojournalist Shannon Mathers embarks on a solo hike to scatter her father's ashes. Along the way, she witnesses a secret drug deal involving corrupt cop Billie Jean Stanhope. Shannon hides and takes pictures of it, but she is discovered and chased. Newly retired city police officer Jack Harris just lost his wife to cancer and went to a remote mountain cabin owned by his niece Pam to get over his loss. While walking thoughtfully in the woods, Jack runs into Jean as she is about to execute Shannon. He draws his gun and tries to take Shannon away, but from then on they must escape a network of violent and corrupt cops and their sheriff Hank Rivers, who is running for mayor.

== Cast ==
- Jaime King as Shannon Mathers
- Bruce Willis as retired police officer Jack Harris
- Lala Kent as Deputy Officer Billie Jean Stanhope
- Michael Sirow as Hank Rivers
- Tyler Olson as Tommy Rivers
- Kelly Greyson as Pam Harris
- Mike Burns as Officer Frank Rogers

== Production ==
Filming occurred in November 2020. Complications with COVID-19 safety protocols created difficulties in getting the cast and crew cleared to shoot and delayed production for several days. As a result, the entire film was shot in nine days and all of Bruce Willis's scenes, which included 25 pages of dialogue, were shot in only one day. Out of Death is one of the last films to star Willis, who retired from acting because he was diagnosed with frontotemporal dementia.

== Release ==
The film received a limited theatrical run and was released on demand by Vertical Entertainment on July 16, 2021.

== Reception ==
=== Box office ===
Out of Death grossed $95,813 in territories it was released theatrically, plus $434,185 with home video sales.

=== Critical response ===
On the review aggregator website Rotten Tomatoes, 0% of 12 critics' reviews are positive, with an average rating of 2.5/10.

Peter Bradshaw of The Guardian rated it 2 out of 5 and wrote: "The film squanders one or two promising plot ideas, and winds up making a hamfisted paean of praise to the idea of "open carry" gun ownership." Todd Jorgenson of Cinemalogue gave the film a negative review and stated, "The cryptic title is about the only intriguing facet of this formulaic cat-and-mouse thriller."

=== Accolades ===
As with all 2021 movies in which he appeared, Bruce Willis received a Golden Raspberry Award nomination for his performance in this movie in the category Worst Performance by Bruce Willis in a 2021 Movie. The category was later retracted after his family announced his retirement due to aphasia.
