= Mystery Land (EP) =

1997 EP by Y-Traxx

EP by Y-Traxx
- Released: 1997
- Recorded: 1997
- Genre: Trance
- Length: 20:02
- Label: FFRR

Mystery Land is an EP by Y-Traxx. Released in 1997, it charted at #63 on the UK Singles Chart.

== Track listing ==
No.	Title	Length
1.	"Mystery Land (radio edit)"	3:59
2.	"Trance Piano"	5:31
3.	"Kiss the Sound"	5:05
4.	"Mystery Land"	5:27
Total length:		20:02
