= Perfecto Presents Ibiza =

Compilation album by Paul Oakenfold
- Released: 14 August 2001
- Genre: Progressive trance; trance; progressive house; big beat; breakbeat; garage house
- Label: Perfecto

Paul Oakenfold chronology
Swordfish <<The Album>> (2001)	Perfecto Presents Ibiza (2001)	Bunkka (2002)

Perfecto Presents chronology
Perfecto Presents Breakin' (2001)	Perfecto Presents Ibiza (2001)	Perfecto Presents: Horizons (2002)

Perfecto Presents Ibiza is a DJ mix album by Paul Oakenfold.

== Track listing ==
=== Disc 1 ===
1. Nat Monday - "Waiting" (John Creamer Remix)
2. Jan Johnston - "Superstar" (Bill Hamel Mix)
3. The Realm - "This Is Not a Breakdown"
4. Flash - "Megatron"
5. Elektronauts - "Bumper" (Plump DJ's Mix)
6. Radiohead - "Idioteque"
7. Accadia - "Into the Dawn" (Ashtrax Remix)
8. Timo Maas - "Maas Attacks"
9. Arena - "Transit"
10. The Prodigy - "Narayan"

=== Disc 2 ===
1. World Clique - "Different Signs"
2. Depeche Mode- - "I Feel Loved" (Danny Tenaglia's Labour of Love Mix)
3. Nilo - "A Summer Song (Be My Friend)" (Davoli's Propane Mix)
4. AB/DC - "The Feeling"
5. U2 - "Beautiful Day" (The Perfecto Mix)
6. Max Graham - "Sepia"
7. Nuclear Ramjet - "Deep Blue" (Remix)
8. Flash - "The Day After"
9. Jan Johnston - "Silent Words" (Solarstone Vocal Mix)
10. Insigma - "Open Your Eyes" (Instrumental)
11. PPK - "Resurection" (Space Club Mix)
