= The Infinity Project =

UK musical group

- Origin: United Kingdom
- Genres: Goa trance
- Years active: 1991–1997
- Past members: Raja Ram; Graham Wood; Anjee Sian

The Infinity Project (TIP) was a British 1990s goa trance band. Members included Raja Ram, Graham Wood and Anjee Sian, with Simon Posford occasionally working with them. Other contributors include Martin Freeland (Man With No Name) and Nick Barber (Doof).

In 1994, Infinity Project members Graham Wood and Raja Ram, along with Ian St Paul founded the record label TIP Records.

== Discography ==
- Feeling Weird – TIP Records (1995)
- Mystical Experiences – Blue Room (1995)
- The Mystery of the Yeti / Mystical Experiences (Reissue) – TIP World (2004)
- Mystical Experiences – Avatar Records (2004)
