= Brancaccio & Aisher =

British house music producer duo

Brancaccio & Aisher are a British duo of house music producers Luke Brancaccio and Bruce Aisher.

== Biography ==
As remixers they have a large catalog of hits. They hit #1 on both the Billboard Hot Dance Club Play chart and the UK Dance Chart in 2002 with the track "It's Gonna Be...(A Lovely Day)", it also reached the position #40 in the United Kingdom. It's a song which featured elements of the 1978 song "Lovely Day" by Bill Withers.

Brancaccio and Aisher also formed the band Suicide Sports Club, and released the album, Electric Mistress, in 2005. The track "2.20 Boy" (an alternative version of the album track "2.20 Girl") was used in the US film, The Invisible.

Aisher has gone on to release solo tracks and remixes. He is completing work on an album with his new band, Go Control. Aisher also writes for Future Music and lectures at Hertfordshire University.

== See also ==
- List of artists who reached number one on the US Dance chart
