= Cream Anthems 97 =

Remix album by Paul Oakenfold
- Released: 10 November 1997
- Genre: Electronic Dance
- Label: Bmg Int'l

Cream Anthems 97 is a mix album, Disc 1 by Paul Oakenfold and Disc 2 by Nick Warren.

== Disc 1 ==
1. "Mystery Land"
2. "Plastic Dreams" [Dave Morales Club Mix]
3. "Remember" [Album Version]
4. "Home" [Salt Tank Reconstruction]
5. "Rendezvous" [Quadrophonic Mix]
6. "Reflect" [Original Mix]
7. "Cafe del Mar" [Three 'N' One Mix]
8. "Nightmare" [Original Sinister Strings Mix]
9. "You're Not Alone" [Oakenfold/Osborne Remix]
10. "Flash" [Club Mix]
11. "How Deep Is Your Love" [Original Mix]
12. "X-Ray (Follow Me)"
13. "The Prophet" [Original Mix]
14. "Schöneberg"
15. "Prophase" [X-Cabs Remix One]

== Disc 2 ==
1. "Free"
2. "Freestyle Orchestra"
3. "Belo Horizonti" [Original Mix]
4. "Gunman"
5. "Ajare" [Original Mix]
6. "Breathe"
7. "Nine Ways" [Original Mix]
8. "Cowgirl"
9. "Your Face (In the Mirror)"
10. "Don't Be Afraid" [Brittany Remix]
11. "Off Shore" [Disco Citizens Remix]
12. "Everytime" [Nalin & Kane Mix]
13. "Get Up! Go Insane" [Rock 'N' Roll Mix]
14. "Sunchyme"
15. "Block Rockin' Beats"
