= Mozaic =

British group

- Origin: England
- Genres: Pop, Electro house, Dance
- Years active: 1994–1997
- Labels: Positiva; Perfecto
- Past members: Miriam Wood; Wendy Fletcher; Marlene Powis; Richard Pinnock

Mozaic were a British group, active in the mid-1990s.

== Discography ==
=== Singles ===
List of singles, with selected chart positions
Title	Year	Chart positions		
Title	Year	UK	AUS	FIN
"Nothing in the World"	1994	86	20	—
"Sing It (The Hallelujah Song)"	1995	14	112	17
"Rays of the Rising Sun"	1996	32	—	—
"Moving Up Moving On"	1996	62	—	—
