= Cream (nightclub) =

Nightclub in Liverpool

Coordinates: 53.402°N 2.981°W

Cream logo

Cream was a music promotion trio (Darren Hughes, James Barton and Andy Carroll) that originally began hosting a weekly house music club night (1992–2002) at the now-demolished Nation nightclub (formerly Snobs Disco) in Wolstenholme Square in Liverpool. It ran in this format from October 1992 to June 2002.

Cream has counted Steve Lawler and Yousef amongst its resident DJs.

Cream also hosts the dance music festival Creamfields every August in Daresbury, Cheshire. Creamfields has won the award for Best Dance Event at the UK Festival Awards a record six times since the awards began 10 years ago, most recently in December 2014. In 2010, they also won the Music Week award for "Festival of the Year".

In 2012, Live Nation acquired the Creamfields Festival Brand from Cream on a contract basis .

Cream's home in Wolstenholme Square, Liverpool, was demolished in 2016 as part of an urban regeneration project. Plans to build a new home for the nightclub as part of the development were retrospectively removed from the planning application.

== Cream Ibiza ==
Every Thursday during the Ibiza clubbing season Cream hosts a club night at Amnesia.

== Releases ==
The label has had a history of releasing DJ mix albums, originally from their own label and later Deconstruction Records (1995–98), Virgin/EMI (1998–03), WEA (2004–05), Ministry of Sound (2006–11) and New State Recordings (2011–present). Releases from the club have been acclaimed. One of its earlier releases, Paul Oakenfold's Goa Mix, originally broadcast on radio, was described by Resident Advisor as "groundbreaking in its cinematic two-hour scope" and an "Essential Mix frequently cited as the best and favorite by both listeners and DJs." Cream Live Two (1996) featured Q's 1997 list of "The 10 Best DJ Mix Albums...Ever!". Cream Beach 2002 (2002) was noted by AllMusic as an example of how, "as usual, Cream has gone out of its way to compile an album appropriately, and impressively, suited for such [communal] occasions." Paul Oakenfold's Creamfields (2004) was subsequently nominated for "Best Electronic/Dance Album" at the 2005 Grammy Awards. Many of their albums have also been commercially successful, most evidently so with Cream Anthems 2001 (2000), which reached number 1 in the UK Compilation Chart.

== See also ==
- List of electronic dance music venues
