= Y-Traxx =

- Also known as: Digital Man
- Genres: Trance Techno
- Labels: ffrr, Nebula Records
- Past members: DJ Laurent David, Frédéric De Backer, TC Process

Y-Traxx was a band consisting of DJ Laurent David, Frédéric De Backer and TC Process. Their EP, Mystery Land, made No. 63 on the UK Singles Chart in 1997 and reached No. 70 on re-release with additional vocals by Neve in 2003.
