= Martin Freeland =

British DJ and producer

Man With No Name
- Also known as: Man With No Name, M.W.N.N., Positiv Noize
- Born: Martin Freeland
- Origin: United Kingdom
- Genres: Goa trance, psytrance, techno
- Years active: 1985–present
- Labels: Dragonfly Records, Perfecto Records, Atomic Records, TIP Records

Martin Freeland is a British psytrance artist, record producer and DJ, who has performed under the pseudonym of Man With No Name since 1990. He is best known for the singles "Teleport" and "Floor-Essence", both of which appeared in the UK Singles Chart.

== Music career ==
=== Early work: 1985–1993 ===
Freeland's career began in the mid 1980s, working as a producer and remixer for various dance artists such as Belouis Some and Mirage. In the late 1980s he began producing original material under the names of Positiv Noize, Perfectly Ordinary People and Pisces, with the latter experimenting with the sound of techno with the single "Take Me Higher".

In 1990 Freeland released the single "Way Out West" under the name of Man With No Name. The track sampled lines from the western film, The Good, the Bad and the Ugly, and was backed with the acid house track "From Within The Mind of My 909", which was later featured on Richard Sen's 2012 compilation This Ain't Chicago: The Underground Sound Of UK House & Acid 1987–1991 on Strut Records.

Further singles in the early nineties, such as "Geddit?/120 Something" and the EP "From Within", echoed the sound of Detroit techno and British rave. It was during this time that Freeland attended one of the first UK trance parties Concept in Dance, where Paul Oakenfold introduced producer Ian St Paul to Freeland and his music. Following this, Freeland produced several tracks under the MWNN title for two Concept in Dance compilations, Tribal Science and Digital Alchemy. One of these tracks was "Sugar Rush", which would later be released in remixed form as a single.

=== Goa years: 1994–1998 ===
Having refined his sound to a harder, more melodic style of Goa trance, Freeland worked closely with Ian St Paul, Graham Wood and Raja Ram under the name of The Infinity Project, as well as contributing the single "Teleport" to the first TIP Records compilation. Teleport was simultaneously released on Dragonfly Records, where he again contributed tracks to a number of their compilations.

Back on the Concept in Dance label, Freeland released his first full-length album Moment of Truth. The singles "Floor-Essence" and "Sugar Rush" were taken from the album, though released on Perfecto. Freeland's connection with Perfecto led to him touring with labelmates such as Mozaic and Quivver, while the label's promotional plugging led to his singles reaching the UK Singles Chart.

Freeland also contributed to Positiva's rainforest charity project 'Earth Trance' in 1996 with the track "Osmosis". The compilation project featured tracks by trance artists across the scene and raised money for charity in the process.

The success of Man With No Name was recognised by the end of 1995, with Muzik voting "Floor-Essence" as the twelfth best single of the year, and Moment of Truth being ranked as 26th Best Album of the year. Freeland was also a highly sought-after remixer, although he 'politely refused' to remix JX's 'There's Nothing I Won't Do' when asked by Hooj Choons.

Freeland continued to release material on Perfecto for the rest of the 1990s, with a second album Earth Moving The Sun in 1998.

=== Progressive years: 1999–2003 ===
In the late 1990s and early 2000s, Progressive psytrance gained popularity, and Freeland's sound altered accordingly. Signing briefly onto Brighton trance label Atomic Records, a few further Man With No Name singles were released, while back on Dragonfly Freeland remixed "Teleport" into a more progressive 'Stripped' mix. A third album, again on Dragonfly, was then released in 2003.

=== Recent work ===
The last decade has seen little new material from Freeland, though he continues to tour the globe as Man With No Name. A few new tracks were released on TIP Records' compilation Future Sound Masters in 2005, which sparked rumours of a fourth album.

In 2011, Perfecto Fluoro released three new remixes of the tracks "Floor-Essence", "Sugar Rush" and "Teleport", with contributions from Astrix and Nick Sentience. This was followed by Freeland remixing "Remember Love" by DJ's United, a collaboration between Paul Oakenfold, Paul Van Dyk and Armin Van Buuren.

=== Remix work ===
As Man With No Name, Freeland was a popular choice for remixes. Initially remixing tracks for Perfecto labelmates Grace and BT, he went on to remix four singles for Hooj Choons, two for Juno Reactor and even remixed a track for the Human League.

=== Collaborations and acknowledgments ===
As well as being a contributor to The Infinity Project, Freeland also produced tracks for Goa artists such as Dino Psaras, Cydonia, Psychaos and Ayahuasca. He also released a track under the name of Yogi & Grey One entitled "Big Trouble in Outer Space", which was later re-released under the Man With No Name title.

French Goa trance group Transwave paid tribute to Freeland, dedicating their track "Land of Freedom" to 'M.W.N.N.'. The track is featured on their album Phototropic (1996).

In 2017 psytrance producer Talamasca dedicated a track on his album A Brief History of Goa Trance to Man With No Name, using melodies from several of his tracks.

== Discography ==
=== Albums ===
- Moment of Truth (1996)
- Earth Moving the Sun (1998)
- Teleportation (2000)
- Interstate Highway (2003)

=== Chart singles ===
- "Way Out West (1990) – UK No. 96
- "Geddit?/120 Something" (1991)
- "From Within EP" (1992)
- "Teleport/Sly-Ed" (1994)
- "Floor-Essence" (1995) – UK No. 68
- "Lunar Cycle" (1995)
- "Paint A Picture" (1996) – UK No. 42 – featuring Hannah
- "Teleport" / "Sugar Rush" (1996) – UK No. 55
- "Vavoom!" (1998) – UK No. 43
- "The First Day (Horizon)" (1998) – UK No. 72
- "Reincarnation/Revenge" (2000)
- "Teleport (Remixes)" (2000)
- "Axis Flip/Lights Out" (2003)
- "Remixes EP" (2011)
- "Vice Versa" (2014)

Singles

- Candyfloss Corona (2021)
