= Jan Johnston =

English singer-songwriter

- Born: 21 February 1968 (age 58)
- Origin: Salford, England
- Genres: Trance, pop
- Occupation: Singer-songwriter
- Years active: 1991–present
- Label: Perfecto
- Website: Official website

Jan Johnston (born 21 February 1968) is an English professional singer & songwriter, best known for collaborating with some of the world's top trance music DJs and producers.

== Career ==
In the early 1990s, she was signed to Columbia Records as part of the pop duo J.J. (with fellow Mancunian Tony Kirkham), which gained some recognition while touring the UK with the #55 minor UK hit "If This Is Love", as well as "Slide Away".

However, when the band project failed she continued as a solo artist, turning down the opportunity to sign to Deconstruction Records and instead signing to A&M Records. In the mid 1990s, she came to the attention of trance producer BT when he purchased her single "Paris" (which included the song "The Prayer", whose choruses would become the vocal hooks for their most famous collaboration, "Anomaly (Calling Your Name)") from a bargain bin in Manchester. Impressed by her vocals, he decided to collaborate with her recording the track "Remember" for the album ESCM.

Following this, Johnston was in demand to vocal for many other trance tracks, notably for Alan Bremmer and Anthony Pappa's "Freefall" project. Upon being given the instrumental, Jan came up with the lyrics resulting in "Skydive (I Feel Wonderful)" which, despite being a club anthem, never translated to a commercial hit, finally hitting the top 40 at No. 35 on its third release in 2001.

=== Perfecto Records ===
Paul Oakenfold signed her to his Perfecto Records label in 1999, with Jan initially recording three dance tracks with Jamie Myerson: "Religion"; "Flesh" (a track Johnston had previously written with BT that Perfecto planned to be the first single release by Johnson on Perfecto) and a re-recording of "Time", a demo previously recorded with Rob Davis retitled "Am I on Pause?", which Paul Oakenfold played on his 1999 tour.

None of these tracks were released and plans for the release of "Flesh" were shelved in favour of Jan recording Emerging, an album of acoustic pop (which could then be remixed for the clubs and Perfecto's audience) with Jamie Myerson. A cover of The Carpenters' song, "Superstar", was lined up to be the album's first single in 2000, with remixes produced by Todd Terry, Tiësto and Bill Hamel and a video filmed, but would ultimately go on to be unreleased.

Instead, Perfecto revisited "Flesh", releasing new remixes of this by Tiësto and Tilt rather than a track from the album, which reached No. 36 in the charts in March 2001. The original version of "Flesh", recorded in 1999, was not part of the release package and it was not until 2019 that it saw release.

Following this, Perfecto returned to the Emerging album with remixes of one of the album tracks and planned singles, "As the Cracks Appear", emerging on a Perfecto 2001 summer promo release, though these went unreleased. Instead, Perfecto released the single "Silent Words", which reached No. 57 in the UK charts. This would be the only track to be released from Emerging during this time, with the album delayed numerous times due to disagreements with Perfecto's then-parent label Mushroom UK due to its lack of dance tracks, and then later due to Mushroom's sale by NewsCorp and was ultimately unreleased following Mushroom UK's subsequent acquisition by Warner Music.

Of the Emerging recordings and remixes, aside from "Silent Words", only a remix of "Superstar" and a remix of the album track "Unafraid", appearing on the soundtrack to the film Swordfish, were released. In 2002, Perfecto issued promo releases for new remixes of "Am I on Pause?", though these also went unreleased.

=== Post-Perfecto Records ===
Following the cancellation of the Emerging project, Johnston continued to write and record with trance producers, contributing five tracks to Paul van Dyk's Grammy Award-nominated album, Reflections amongst other projects, though once again the majority of them went unreleased.

In 2008, new solo tracks by Johnston began to emerge, with two of them being "Sleeping Satellite" and "Obsession", released digitally in 2009 by Perfecto; however, there have been no further solo releases since. She continues to provide guest vocals on a number of trance music tracks, most of which have been released. Notable tracks include "As It Should" with Tenishia in 2012 and "Skysearch" with DJ Feel in 2015.

=== Digital re-issues and release of unreleased material ===
In 2016, a previously unreleased album of Jan's entitled When Everything Was Possible that was recorded with Jamie Myerson in 1998 ahead of her signing to Perfecto was released on Jan's Bandcamp page, and a few months later, Johnston's music as part of the duo J.J. was digitally re-issued by Sony Music. A digital re-issued of Naked But for Lilies followed in April 2017 by Universal Music, along with the "Flesh" and "Silent Words" singles by Warner Music in August 2017.

In June 2017, Johnston released the song "Falling Away", the first song from The Travelling Vixen, a collection of previously unreleased material written and recorded with DJ Manolo following the Emerging project.

In 2018, Johnston signed to Solar Storm Records with new remixes of her singles "Calling Your Name" and "Flesh" released.

In November 2019, it was announced that Johnston's Emerging album would be released by August Day Records, almost 20 years after its initial planned release date. The cancelled 2001 single "As the Cracks Appear" was released on 22 November on Solar Storm along with "Religion", with Emerging being released on 29 November with plans for the release of old singles "Superstar" and "Am I on Pause?" to follow.

== Discography ==
=== J.J. ===
==== Albums ====
- 1991 Intro...

==== Singles ====
- 1988 "If I Never See Sunday"
- 1990 "Slide Away"
- 1991 "If This Is Love"
- 1991 "Crying Over You"

=== Jan Johnston ===
==== Albums ====
- 1994 Naked But for Lilies (A&M Records)
- 2000 Emerging (initially unreleased - released in 2019) (Perfecto Records)
- 2016 When Everything Was Possible (recorded in 1998 - self-released)
- 2017 The Travelling Vixen (recorded in 2004 - self-released)

==== Singles ====
- 1994 "Paris" (A&M Records)
- 1994 "Alive" (A&M Records)
- 1998 "Asking Too Much" (featuring Jamie Myerson) (Sound Gizmo) (original version released in 2016)
- 2000 "Superstar" (Perfecto Records; initially unreleased - released 2019)
- 2001 "Flesh" (Perfecto Records) (#36 UK, re-issued 2002 - #119 UK)
- 2001 "As the Cracks Appear" (Perfecto Records; initially unreleased - released 2019)
- 2001 "Silent Words" (Perfecto Records) (#57 UK)
- 2002 "Am I on Pause?" (Perfecto Records; initially unreleased - released 2019)
- 2003 "Calling Your Name" (Art of Trance [Simon Berry] re-recorded version with new vocals; Platipus Records) (#80 UK)
- 2008 "Everything I Need (Sea of Dreams)" (Perfecto Records)
- 2009 "Happy Ending" (Metallic Recordings) (re-issued in 2017)
- 2009 "Sleeping Satellite" (Perfecto Digital)
- 2009 "Obsession" (Perfecto Digital)
- 2012 "As It Should" with Tenishia (Malta) (Armada TV)
- 2017 "Falling Away" (self-released)
- 2017 "Delirium" (self-released)
- 2017 "Imagination" (self-released)
- 2018 "Calling Your Name" (re-issue and new remixes)
- 2019 "Flesh" (new remixes and first release of the original 1999 version)
- 2025 "Innocent Sky" with Nick The Kid & S.H.O.K.K. (HTE Recordings)
