= Goa trance =

Electronic music style

- Stylistic origins: Trance; EBM; psychedelic rock; acid house; new beat; Indian classical music
- Cultural origins: Early 1990s, Goa, India
- Derivative forms: Psychedelic trance, nitzhonot

Fusion genres
- Psybient

Goa trance is an electronic dance music style that originated in the early 1990s in the Indian state of Goa. Goa trance often has drone-like basslines, similar to the techno minimalism of 21st century psychedelic trance (psytrance). Psychedelic trance developed from Goa trance. The typically long songs built on progressive beat changes are said to put the listener in a "trance".

== History ==
The music has its roots in the popularity of Goa, India as a hippie capital in the late 1960s and early 1970s. Throughout the 1980s, music incorporating elements of industrial music, new beat and electronic body music (EBM), with the spiritual culture in India were commonplace, although Goa trance did not appear as a style until the early 1990s.

The music played was a blend of styles loosely defined as techno, new beat and various genres of "computer music" (e.g., high energy disco without vocals, acid-house, electro, industrial-gothic, various styles of house and electronic-rock hybrids). It arrived on tape cassettes by traveller-collectors and DJs and was shared (copied) tape-to-tape among Goa DJs, in an underground scene not driven by labels or the music industry.

Prior to the 1980s, the music played at parties was performed by live bands and tapes were played in between sets. In the early 1980s, sampling synth and MIDI music appeared globally and DJs became the preferred format in Goa, with two tape decks driving a party without a break, facilitating continuous music.

Cassette tapes were used by DJs until the 1990s, when DAT tapes were used. DJs playing in Goa during the 1980s included Fred Disko, Dr Bobby, Stephano, Paulino, Mackie, Babu, Laurent, Ray, Fred, Antaro, Lui, Rolf, Tilo, Pauli, Rudi, and Goa Gil. The music was eclectic in style but based around instrumental dub versions of tracks that evoked mystical, cosmic, psychedelic, and existential themes. Special mixes were made by DJs in Goa that were the editing of various versions of a track to make it longer.

By 1990–91, Goa had become a hot destination for partying and was no longer under the radar: the scene grew bigger. Goa-style parties spread like a diaspora all over the world from 1993, and a multitude of labels in various countries (UK, Australia, Japan, Germany) dedicated themselves to promoting psychedelic electronic music that reflected the ethos of Goa parties, Goa music and Goa-specific artists and producers and DJs. Mark Maurice's 'Panjaea's focal point' parties brought it to London in 1992 and its programming at London club megatripolis gave a great boost to the small international scene that was then growing (October 21, 1993 onwards). The golden age and first wave of Goa trance was generally agreed upon aesthetically between 1994 and 1997.

Goa trance in the music industry and as a collective party fashion did not gain global recognition until 1994, when Paul Oakenfold began to champion the genre via his own Perfecto label and in the media, most notably with the release of his 1994 Essential Mix, or more commonly known as the Goa Mix.

== Sound ==
The original goal of the music was to assist the dancers in experiencing a collective state of bodily transcendence, similar to that of ancient shamanic dancing rituals, through hypnotic, pulsing melodies and rhythms. As such, goa trance has an energetic beat, often in a standard 4/4 dance rhythm. A typical track will generally build up to a much more energetic movement in the second half before reaching an intense climax, then taper off fairly quickly toward the end. The tempo typically lies in the 130–150 BPM range, although some tracks may have a tempo as low as 110 or as high as 160 BPM. Generally 8–12 minutes long, Goa trance tracks tend to focus on steadily building energy throughout, using changes in percussion patterns and more intricate and layered synth parts as the music progresses in order to build a hypnotic and intense feel.

The kick drum often is a low, thick sound with prominent sub-bass frequencies. The music very often incorporates many audio effects that are often created through experimentation with synthesisers. A well-known sound that originated with Goa trance and became much more prevalent through its successor, which evolved Goa trance into a music genre known as psytrance, has the organic "squelchy" sound (usually a sawtooth-wave which is run through a resonant band-pass or high-pass filter).

Other music technology used in Goa trance includes popular analogue synthesizers such as the Roland TB-303, Roland Juno-60/106, Novation Bass-Station, Korg MS-10, and the Roland SH-101. Hardware samplers manufactured by Akai Professional, Yamaha and Ensoniq were also popular for sample playback and manipulation.

A popular signature element of Goa trance is the use of vocal samples, often from science fiction movies. Those samples mostly contain references to psychedelic drugs, cannabis, parapsychology, extraterrestrial life, existentialism, out of body experiences, dreams, physics, molecular biology, electronics, time travel and spirituality.

Detroit techno was introduced in 1999 by a group of anonymous artists who performed exclusively Detroit techno and Chicago house at a venue known as Laughing Buddha (formally known as Klinsons) in Baga, Goa. They were the first to play this style of music with turntables. Using vinyl was a first for Goa at that time. Until then DJs usually used mini discs, DATs and CDs, without beat matching to mix. The introduction of the Detroit sound had a lasting effect on Goa trance, leading to a more industrialized sound.

== Parties ==
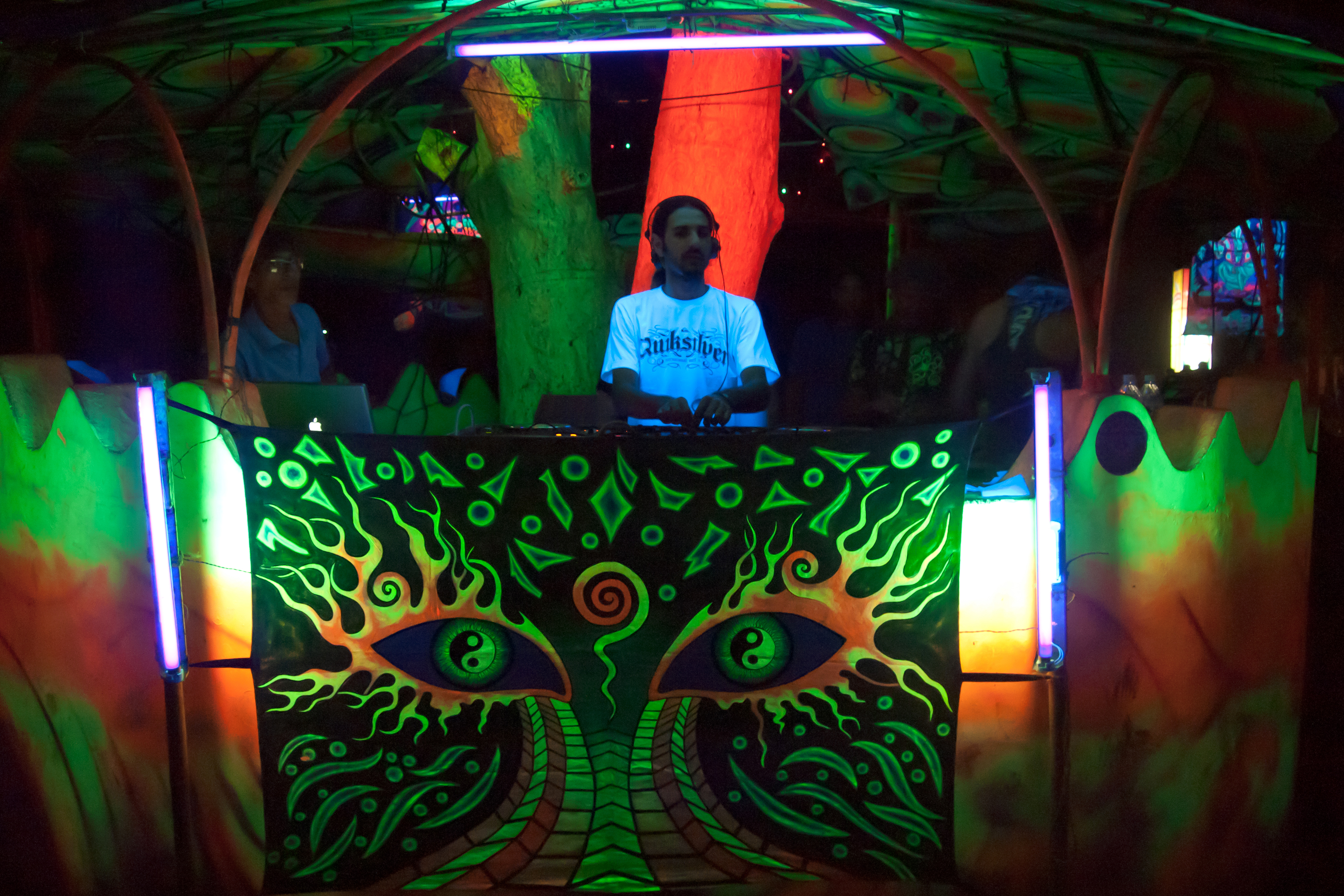
DJ playing Goa trance in Hilltop, Vagator, Goa.

The first parties were those held at Bamboo Forest at South Anjuna beach, Disco Valley at Vagator beach and Arambol beach (c. 1991–1993) and attempts initially were made to turn them into commercial events, which met with much resistance and the need to pay the local Goan police baksheesh. Events were generally staged around a bar, even though these were often only a temporary fixture in the forest or beach. The parties taking place around the new year tend to be the most chaotic with busloads of people coming in from all places such as Mumbai, Delhi, Gujarat, Bangalore, Hyderabad, and Chennai. Travelers and sadhus from all over India passed by to join in.

Megatripolis in London was a great influence in popularising the sound. Running from June 1993 though really programming the music from October 1993 when it moved to Heaven nightclub it made all the national UK press, running until October 1996.

In 1993 a party organization called Return to the Source also brought the sound to London, UK. Starting life at the Rocket in North London with a few hundred followers, the Source went on to a long residency at Brixton's 2,000 capacity Fridge and to host several larger 6,000 capacity parties in Brixton Academy, their New Year's Eve parties gaining reputations for being very special. The club toured across the UK, Europe and Israel throughout the 1990s and went as far as two memorable parties on the slopes of Mount Fuji in Japan and New York's Liberty Science Center. By 2001 the partners Chris Deckker, Mark Allen, Phil Ross and Janice Duncan were worn out and all but gone their separate ways. The last Return to the Source party was at Brixton Academy in 2002.

Goa parties have a definitive visual aspect – the use of "fluoro" (fluorescent paint) is common on clothing and on decorations such as tapestries. The graphics on these decorations are usually associated with topics such as aliens, Hinduism, other religious (especially eastern) images, mushrooms (and other psychedelic art), shamanism and technology. Shrines in front of the DJ stands featuring religious items are also common decorations.

== In popular culture ==
For a short period in the mid-1990s, Goa trance enjoyed significant commercial success with support from DJs, who later went on to assist in developing a much more mainstream style of trance outside Goa.

== See also ==
- Music of Goa
