= Greatest Hits & Remixes =

Greatest hits album by Paul Oakenfold
- Released: 23 October 2007
- Genre: Trance, progressive trance
- Length: 156:34
- Label: Perfecto, Ultra, New State
- Producer: Paul Oakenfold

Paul Oakenfold chronology
A Lively Mix (2006)	Greatest Hits & Remixes (2007)	Oakenfold Anthems (2008)

Greatest Hits & Remixes is a compilation album by British electronic producer and disc jockey Paul Oakenfold featuring both old and new tracks and remixes from Oakenfold, released in 2007 commemorating his 100th official remix. The album was released in November in the United Kingdom with a double CD set and a triple CD version with the same number of songs. It was also released in the United States with only 20 tracks on one CD. It featured some remixes from the original version but it also included two new remixes which are Justin Timberlake's "My Love" song and his remix of Hans Zimmer's "Jack Theme Suite" which was used for the film Pirates of the Caribbean: At World's End (2007). Releases with the catalogue number "UL 1602-2" included a bonus DVD of a live show and a documentary on Oakenfold.

== Reception ==
Professional ratings
Review scores
Source	Rating
AbsolutePunk	(8.4/10)
AllMusic	(favourable)
Exclaim.ca	"Get it"
Hybrid Magazine	(favourable)
PopMatters	(6/10)

The album received positive reception from music critics. AllMusic were favourable, saying that by the release of his album, "his standing as a giant in the history of the [dance and electronica] genre had been confirmed. This dazzling compilation plays as a testament to Oakenfold's contributions, from his remixes of stadium rockers (U2, Madonna, and Radiohead) to classic rave (Underworld) to trip hop (Massive Attack) to originals, Oakenfold's knob-twiddling wizardry is unparalleled, and the delicious grooves and sonic textures of this retrospective attest to the fact." Exclaim.ca were favourable, saying Oakenfold has "got a grasp of the mathematics of tracks and how they are formed to the degree that, as a remix artist, his enhancement of the music generally comes naturally. There are also some original tracks by Oakenfold as well," instructing readers to "get it". AbsolutePunk rated the album 8.4/10, saying "Oakenfold’s arrangements have bold sonic streaks and digital beats which fit the club music standard while indulging in his imagination and fascination with electronica based music." PopMatters rated the album six stars out of ten, saying, "ironically, Oakenfold’s Greatest Hits is a hit-or miss affair, swerving violently from big-beat pleasure spots to bloated paycheck-padding remixes (and Richard Norris' ego-pumping liner note essay certainly doesn’t make matters any better). Oakenfold’s massive popularity has been both his greatest gift as well as his greatest curse. At the end of the day, the only person that Oakenfold is trying to impress is the one shaking everything they got on the dancefloor. If that person is you, then pick up Greatest Hits & Remixes and call it a day." Resident Advisor wondered why Grace's "Not Over Yet" was absent from the compilation, but stated the compilation "gives a quick overview of Oakenfold's 20-year career."

The album was also successful commercially, reaching number 13 on the UK Compilation Chart. The following year, Oakenfold would release another retrospective, Oakenfold Anthems (2008), focused not only on material by himself but material from his label Perfecto Records.

== Track listing ==
=== UK 2xCD version ===
Greatest Hits & Remixes disc one
No.	Title	Length
1.	"Skunk Anansie – Brazen (Weep)" (Perfecto Mix)	5:19
2.	"The Cure – Close to Me" (Closer Mix)	4:02
3.	"Sneaker Pimps – 6 Underground" (Perfecto Remix)	4:53
4.	"Paul Oakenfold – Starry Eyed Surprise"	3:30
5.	"Happy Mondays – Step On" (Twisting My Melon Mix)	4:23
6.	"Justin Timberlake – Rock Your Body" (Oakenfold Remix)	5:20
7.	"The Stone Roses – Waterfall" (12" Remix)	3:16
8.	"Bad Apples – Get It On" (Club Mix)	6:09
9.	"Massive Attack – Unfinished Sympathy" (Perfecto Mix)	4:43
10.	"Mark Ronson ft. Daniel Merriweather – Stop Me" (Exclusive New Oakenfold 2008 Remix)	4:23
11.	"Paul Oakenfold – Sex 'n' Money"	5:56
12.	"Arrested Development – Mr Wendal" (Perfecto Mix)	4:31
13.	"Mansun – Wide Open Space" (Perfecto Remix)	6:20
14.	"Alison Limerick – Where Love Lives" (Perfecto Remix)	4:08
15.	"Robert Owens – I'll Be Your Friend" (Perfecto Re-Edits)	2:37
16.	"The Shamen – Progen 91" (I.R.P. In The Land of Oz)	3:14
17.	"U2 – Even Better Than the Real Thing" (Perfecto Mix)	6:02

Greatest Hits & Remixes disc two
No.	Title	Length
1.	"Olive – You're Not Alone" (Oakenfold & Osborne Remix)	5:00
2.	"Paul Oakenfold ft. Brittany Murphy – Faster Kill Pussycat"	4:22
3.	"Radiohead – Everything in Its Right Place" (Exclusive New Oakenfold 2008 Remix)	6:56
4.	"Groove Zone – Eisbaer" (Exclusive New Oakenfold 2008 Remix)	3:40
5.	"Dirty Vegas – Days Go By" (Oakenfold Vocal Remix)	3:51
6.	"The Smashing Pumpkins – Perfect" (Perfecto Mix)	4:52
7.	"Joyriders – Big Brother UK Theme" (Oakenfold Mix)	2:04
8.	"Paul Oakenfold – Ready Steady Go"	3:14
9.	"Paul Oakenfold – Switch On"	3:33
10.	"Everything But The Girl – Missing" (Exclusive New Oakenfold 2008 Remix)	6:10
11.	"PPK – ResuRection" (The Perfecto Re-Edits)	6:24
12.	"Planet Perfecto – Bullet in the Gun"	5:27
13.	"Madonna – Sorry" (Oakenfold Remix)	4:30
14.	"U2 – Beautiful Day" (The Perfecto Mix)	7:00
15.	"Grace – Not Over Yet" (Perfecto Mix)	3:26
16.	"Paul Oakenfold – Southern Sun" (Exclusive New Oakenfold 2008 Remix)	2:49
17.	"Paul Oakenfold – Not Over" (Robert Vadney Club Edit)	2:52
18.	"Underworld – Born Slippy Nuxx" (Oakenfold Remix)	3:34

=== UK 3xCD version ===
Greatest Hits & Remixes disc one
No.	Title	Length
1.	"Skunk Anansie – Brazen (Weep) (Perfecto Mix)"	7:13
2.	"The Cure – Close to Me (Closer Mix)"	5:44
3.	"Sneaker Pimps – 6 Underground (Perfecto Remix)"	6:04
4.	"Paul Oakenfold – Starry Eyed Surprise"	3:46
5.	"Happy Mondays – Step On (Twisting My Melon Mix)"	5:54
6.	"Justin Timberlake – Rock Your Body (Oakenfold Remix)"	5:36
7.	"The Stone Roses – Waterfall (12" Remix)"	5:34
8.	"Bad Apples – Get It On (Club Mix)"	6:53
9.	"Massive Attack – Unfinished Sympathy (Perfecto Mix)"	5:14
10.	"Mark Ronson ft. Daniel Merriweather – Stop Me (Exclusive New Oakenfold 2008 Remix)"	5:30
11.	"Paul Oakenfold – Sex 'n' Money"	5:58
12.	"Arrested Development – Mr Wendal (Perfecto Mix)"	5:48
13.	"Mansun – Wide Open Space (Perfecto Remix)"	7:17

Greatest Hits & Remixes disc two
No.	Title	Length
1.	"Alison Limerick – Where Love Lives (Perfecto Remix)"	6:29
2.	"Robert Owens – I'll Be Your Friend (Perfecto Re-Edits)"	3:41
3.	"The Shamen – Progen 91 (I.R.P. In The Land of Oz)"	5:22
4.	"U2 – Even Better Than the Real Thing (Perfecto Mix)"	6:37
5.	"Olive – You're Not Alone (Oakenfold & Osborne Remix)"	10:07
6.	"Paul Oakenfold ft. Brittany Murphy – Faster Kill Pussycat"	5:53
7.	"Radiohead – Everything in Its Right Place (Exclusive New Oakenfold 2008 Remix)"	8:17
8.	"Groove Zone – Eisbaer (Exclusive New Oakenfold 2008 Remix)"	7:08
9.	"Dirty Vegas – Days Go By (Paul Oakenfold Vocal Remix)"	5:33
10.	"The Smashing Pumpkins – Perfect (Perfecto Mix)"	6:59
11.	"Joyriders – Big Brother UK Theme (Oakenfold Mix)"	3:40
12.	"Paul Oakenfold – Ready Steady Go"	4:49
13.	"Paul Oakenfold – Switch On"	4:04

Greatest Hits & Remixes disc three
No.	Title	Length
1.	"Everything But The Girl – Missing (Exclusive New Oakenfold 2008 Remix)"	7:43
2.	"PPK – ResuRection (Perfecto Re-Edits)"	7:32
3.	"Planet Perfecto – Bullet in the Gun 2000 (Perfecto Re-Edits)"	10:09
4.	"Madonna – Sorry (Paul Oakenfold Remix)"	7:13
5.	"U2 – Beautiful Day (The Perfecto Mix)"	9:12
6.	"Grace – Not Over Yet (Perfecto Mix)"	7:37
7.	"Paul Oakenfold – Southern Sun (Exclusive New Oakenfold 2008 Remix)"	6:37
8.	"Paul Oakenfold – Not Over (Robert Vadney Club Edit)"	3:01
9.	"Underworld – Born Slippy Nuxx (Paul Oakenfold Remix)"	8:50

=== US version ===
Greatest Hits & Remixes
No.	Title	Length
1.	"Paul Oakenfold – Starry Eyed Surprise"	3:28
2.	"Happy Mondays – Step On (Twisting My Melon Mix)"	2:36
3.	"Massive Attack – Unfinished Sympathy (Perfecto Mix)"	2:55
4.	"Mark Ronson – Stop Me (Exclusive New Oakenfold 2008 Remix)"	3:36
5.	"Justin Timberlake – My Love (Paul Oakenfold Remix)"	4:44
6.	"The Smashing Pumpkins – Perfect (Perfecto Mix)"	4:14
7.	"Dirty Vegas – Days Go By (Oakenfold Vocal Remix)"	3:39
8.	"Paul Oakenfold – Ready Steady Go"	2:25
9.	"David Arnold – James Bond Theme (From The Motion Picture Die Another Day) (Oakenfold Mix)"	2:45
10.	"Paul Oakenfold – Dread Rock"	2:51
11.	"Paul Oakenfold Presents Afrika Bambaataa & The Soulsonic Force – Planet Rock"	3:55
12.	"Olive – You're Not Alone (Oakenfold & Osborne Remix)"	4:14
13.	"Paul Oakenfold – Faster Kill Pussycat"	4:27
14.	"Radiohead – Everything in Its Right Place (Exclusive New Oakenfold 2008 Remix)"	6:41
15.	"Madonna – Sorry (Oakenfold Remix)"	4:21
16.	"U2 – Beautiful Day (The Perfecto Mix)"	6:45
17.	"Paul Oakenfold – Southern Sun (Exclusive New Oakenfold 2008 Remix)"	2:58
18.	"Everything But The Girl – Missing (Exclusive New Oakenfold 2008 Remix)"	6:24
19.	"Hans Zimmer – Jack Theme Suite (Paul Oakenfold Mix)"	3:40
20.	"Underworld – Born Slippy Nuxx (Oakenfold Remix)"	2:54

== Credits ==
- Booklet Photography: Bjoern Kommerell
- Cover Image Photography: Grant Fleming

== Charts ==
=== Weekly charts ===
Chart (2007)	Peak position
US Top Dance Albums (Billboard)	1

=== Year-end charts ===
Chart (2008)	Position
US Top Dance/Electronic Albums (Billboard)	20

== Releases ==
Region	Date	Label	Format	Catalog
United States	23 October 2007	Ultra Records	CD, Compilation, Mixed	UL 1603-2
United States	23 October 2007	Ultra Records	CD, Compilation, Mixed, DVD	UL 1602-2
United Kingdom	November 2007	New State Recordings	2 x CD, Mixed	NEWCD9020
United Kingdom	November 2007	New State Recordings	3 x CD, Compilation	NEWCDX9020
