= Oakenfold Anthems =

Remix album (DJ mix) by Paul Oakenfold
- Released: 5 August 2008
- Recorded: 2008 (mixed)
- Genre: Dance, progressive house, progressive trance, art pop
- Length: 269:43
- Label: Perfecto; Warner
- Producer: Paul Oakenfold

Paul Oakenfold chronology
Greatest Hits & Remixes (2007)	Oakenfold Anthems (2008)	Perfecto: Vegas (2009)

Oakenfold Anthems is a compilation DJ mix album by British electronic producer and disc jockey Paul Oakenfold, released in 2008 on WMTV. His eighteenth mix album, the album is a triple album containing popular electronic singles, mostly focused on the progressive house and progressive trance genres, that Oakenfold considers favourites, and the material on the album mostly draws from Oakenfold's label Perfecto Records. Indeed, the album cover contains the caption "The Classic Perfecto Mix". The album can be seen as a "best of" compilation of Perfecto Records in a similar way to how the previous year's Greatest Hits & Remixes was a "best of" Oakenfold throughout his career.

At the time of release, Oakenfold was interviewed by Clash Music as part of their in depth analysis of acid house, noting Oakenfold "DJ'd at the Stone Roses' Spike Island gig, produced the Happy Mondays' epochal LP Pills 'n' Thrills and Bellyaches and has played at clubs across the globe. However to even things up, he was also responsible for Goa trance."

== Reception ==
Professional ratings
Review scores
Source	Rating
DMC World	5/5 stars
Gigwise	(8/10)
The Sentinel	2/5 stars

The album received positive reviews from critics. A staff editor from Amazon.com said the album "cherry picks from Oakenfold's Perfecto label and beyond, covering his prolific work as a remixer with Steve Osborne and delivering a taste of the man who has played at Wembley, The Hollywood Bowl and even the main stage at Glastonbury" and notes how the tracks are "re-edited and exclusively mixed to capture an epic era in the history of British clubbing by arguably the world's best ever DJ." Gigwise rated the album eight out of ten stars, stating "whether you’re a car park cruising Burberry wearing boy racer, dance music connoisseur or just a memory lane pedestrian, with fifty floor filling tracks to gurn your way through this collection is a must have," and comically noting the album is "bigger than Rik Waller on a weekend McBinge."

Ben Hogwood of DMC Music was very favourable, rating the album five out of five stars, stating "even if you have this music already, Oakenfold's mixing will help you see it with fresh eyes." The Sentinel were less favourable, rating the album two out of five stars, stating "if you'd forgotten what Robert Miles's "Children" sounds like, here it is again. The question is whether you wish to unlock such stuff from the musical recesses of your mind."

The album was also successful commercially, reaching number 9 in the UK Compilation Chart.

== Track listing ==
=== Disc one ===
1. "Flaming June (BT & PVD Mix)" - BT 4:46
2. "Not Over Yet (Original Album Version)"- Grace 4:30
3. "Café Del Mar (Original Three 'n' One Mix)" - Energy 52 6:36
4. "Someone (Original Vocal Mix)" - Ascension 5:59
5. "Schoenberg (Moonmen Over Marmion Mix)" - Marmion 4:30
6. "Southern Sun (DJ Tiësto Mix)" - Paul Oakenfold & Carla Werner 3:16
7. "Madagascar (Original 12")" - Art Of Trance 4:25
8. "Beautiful Day (The Perfecto Mix)" - U2 6:02
9. "Das Glockenspiel" - Schiller 4:47
10. "Wide Open Space (Perfecto Mix) (Edit)" - Mansun 4:28
11. "Summersault" - Taste Xperience 4:35
12. "Not Forgotten" - Leftfield 3:11
13. "9 PM (Till I Come) (Radio Mix)" - ATB 4:27
14. "Love Stimulation (Love Mix)" - Humate 4:15
15. "Silence (Tiesto In Search Of Sunrise Remix)" - Delerium 7:31
16. "Gamemaster" - Signum 3:37
17. "Lizard (Claxixx Mix) - Mauro Picotto 2:36

=== Disc two ===
1. "Hide U (John Creamer & Stephane K Radio Edit)" - Kosheen 4:20
2. "Stella" - Jam & Spoon 2:52
3. "Rapture (John Creamer & Stephane K Mix)" - iiO 4:47
4. "Greece 2000" - Three Drives 5:29
5. "Offshore" - Chicane 4:44
6. "Universal Nation (Ferry Corsten Remix)" - Push 4:56
7. "Bullet In The Gun (Club Mix)" - Planet Perfecto 7:16
8. "Carte Blanche (Original Mix)" - Veracocha 4:54
9. "Venus Of My Dreams (Original Mix)" - Airwave 5:49
10. "Children (Original Version)" - Robert Miles 6:58
11. "Skydive (I Feel Wonderful)" - Freefall & Jan Johnston 6:15
12. "Cream (Club Mix)" - Blank & Jones 3:49
13. "Seven Days And One Week (Radio Edit)" - B.B.E. 5:30
14. "Kernkraft (DJ Gius Remix)" - Zombie Nation 2:44
15. "Barber's Adagio (Ferry Corsten Remix)" - William Orbit 4:34
16. "Born Slippy (Paul Oakenfold Remix)" - Underworld 4:27

=== Disc three ===
1. "Mystery Land (Original Mix)" - Y Traxx 3:56
2. "Butterfly (Tilt's Mechanism Mix)" - Tilt 5:34
3. "Ubik (Dance Original Mix)" - Timo Maas 3:07
4. "Higher State Of Consciousness (Dex & Jonesy Mix)" - Josh Wink 4:40
5. "Salva Mea" - Faithless 5:45
6. "Nightmare (Sinister Strings Mix)" - Brainbug 3:44
7. "Overtime (Nalin & Kane Mix)" - Lustral 5:26
8. "Beachball" - Nalin & Kane 2:51
9. "Eisbaer" - Groove Zone 4:42
10. "Galaxia (Solarstone Mix)" - Moonman 5:51
11. "Gouryella (Original Mix)" - Gouryella 5:36
12. "1998 (Matt Darey Mix)" - Binary Finary 4:11
13. "Out Of The Blue (Original 12" Version)" - System F 4:25
14. "Synaesthesia (En-motion Remix)" - The Thrillseekers 4:00
15. "ResuRection (The Perfecto Edit)" - PPK 5:06
16. "Finished Symphony" - Hybrid 4:44
17. "You're Not Alone (Oakenfold & Osbourne Remix)" - Olive 5:50
