= Trance Mission (Paul Oakenfold album) =

Studio album by Paul Oakenfold
- Released: 20 June 2014
- Genre: Trance; breakbeat
- Length: 108:52
- Label: Perfecto; Armada
- Producer: Paul Oakenfold

Paul Oakenfold chronology
Perfecto Records Miami 2013 (2013)	Trance Mission (2014)	We Are Planet Perfecto Volume 4 (2014)

Trance Mission is the third studio album from the British dance music DJ and producer Paul Oakenfold. It was released on 20 June 2014 through Perfecto Records. The album is the follow-up to Oakenfold's 2006 second studio album A Lively Mind and his debut studio album Bunkka. The Publisher consists of two CDs, which included most famous pieces of electronic dance music in new arrangements.

== Track listing ==
Disc 1 : Trance Mission :

1. "Theme for Great Cities" (Simple Minds cover) – 4:21
2. "Café Del Mar" (Energy 52 cover) – 4:53
3. "Dreams" – 5:25
4. "Barber's Adagio for Strings" (William Orbit & Ferry Corsten cover) – 6:07
5. "Toca Me" (Fragma cover) – 4:17
6. "Ready Steady Go" (Beatman & Ludmilla Radio Remix) – 4:05
7. "Not Over Yet" (Trance Mission Mix) – 5:00
8. "Awakening" (Rank 1 cover) – 5:35
9. "Madagascar" (Art of Trance cover) – 5:28
10. "Open Your Eyes" (Nalin & Kane cover) – 5:45
11. "Hold That Sucker Down" (OT Quartet cover) – 6:45
12. "Touch Me" (with Cass Fox) (Rui da Silva cover) – 5:35

Disc 2 : Trance Mission (The Remixes) :

1. "Barber's Adagio for Strings" (Instrumental Mix) – 6:09
2. "Ready Steady Go" (Plump DJs 303 Bass Mix) – 4:50
3. "Touch Me" (2symmetry Remix) (with Cass Fox) – 6:21
4. "Not Over Yet" (Trance Mission Mix)- 5:02
5. "Dreams" (Yonathan Zvi Remix) - 6:26
6. "Madagascar" (Simons Bostock Remix) - 6:36
7. "Hold That Sucker Down" (Johnny Yono Remix) - 6:05
8. "Open Your Eyes" (Future Disciple Remix) - 10:02
9. "Café del Mar" (Activa Remix) - 7:16
10. "Awakening" (Chris Voro Remix) - 6:26
11. "Toca Me" (Eshericks Remix) - 7:01

== Charts ==
Chart (2014)	Peak position
Dutch Albums (Album Top 100)	14
