= Perfecto Presents: The Club =

Compilation album by Paul Oakenfold
- Released: 25 January 2005
- Genre: Progressive trance; progressive house; breakbeat
- Label: Perfecto; Thrive

Paul Oakenfold chronology
Creamfields (2004)	Perfecto Presents: The Club (2005)	A Lively Mind (2006)

Perfecto Presents chronology
Perfecto Presents: Type (2004)	Perfecto Presents: The Club (2005)	Perfecto Presents: DJ Skribble (2005)

Singles from Perfecto Presents: The Club
- 1. "The Club Theme" Released: 18 July 2005

Professional ratings
Review scores
Source	Rating
Allmusic	3/5 stars

Perfecto Presents: The Club is the seventeenth DJ mix album by British DJ and electronic music producer Paul Oakenfold, released by Thrive Records in 2005. It is the twelfth instalment in his Perfecto Presents series, a series of DJ mix albums themed around Oakenfold's label Perfecto Records.

Oakenfold uses back one of his old alias, Perfecto Allstarz, in this album.

== Critical reception ==
David Jeffries of Allmusic rated the album three stars out of five, saying "Oakenfold isn't "working the wheels of steel" as much as just sequencing the songs in an order that makes dramatic sense, but he does blend a couple of the tracks rather nicely."

== Track listing ==
1. Perfecto Allstarz - "Psycho"
2. Faultline featuring The Flaming Lips - "The Colossal Gray Sunshine" (Paul Oakenfold Remix)
3. Perfecto Allstarz - "Bullit" (Long)
4. Natasha Bedingfield - "If You're Gonna Jump" (Paul Oakenfold Remix)
5. The Doors - "L.A. Woman" (Paul Oakenfold Remix)
6. Justin Timberlake - "Rock Your Body" (Paul Oakenfold Remix)
7. Oakenfold - "Southern Sun"
8. U2- "Beautiful Day" (The Perfecto Remix)
9. PPK - "ResuRection"
10. Jan Johnston - "Delirium"
11. Deadly Avenger - "Artisan"
12. Perfecto Allstarz - "Chroma" (Long)
13. Perfecto Allstarz - "The Club Theme"
