= Starry Eyed Surprise =

2002 single by Paul Oakenfold

Single by Oakenfold

from the album Bunkka
- B-side: "Mortal"
- Released: 19 August 2002
- Studio: Real Noize (UK); Real World (Box, Wiltshire, England)
- Length: 3:09
- Label: Perfecto
- Songwriters: Paul Oakenfold; Seth Binzer; Andy Gray; Fred Neil
- Producers: Paul Oakenfold; Andy Gray

Paul Oakenfold singles chronology
"Southern Sun" (2002)	"Starry Eyed Surprise" (2002)	"The Harder They Come" (2003)

"Starry Eyed Surprise" is a song by English record producer Oakenfold with vocals from Shifty Shellshock of Crazy Town. The song was released on 19 August 2002 as the second single from Oakenfold's debut album, Bunkka (2002), reaching number six in the United Kingdom, number 19 in the Netherlands and New Zealand, number 21 in Ireland, and number 37 in Australia. It also reached the top 50 in Italy and the United States. It was later included on Shifty Shellshock's 2004 album Happy Love Sick and Oakenfold's 2007 album Greatest Hits & Remixes.

== Content ==
The line "Freaky deaky, star speckles and pink butterflies", sung by Shifty Shellshock, is sung in a similar manner to that of his band's previous single, "Butterfly". The song also samples "Everybody's Talkin'" by Harry Nilsson, which is a cover version of the original by Fred Neil, hence why Neil received a songwriter credit for "Starry Eyed Surprise".

== Track listings ==
UK CD single

1. "Starry Eyed Surprise" (single edit) – 3:09
2. "Starry Eyed Surprise" (Josh Wink re-interpretation) – 8:43
3. "Starry Eyed Surprise" (Oliver Lieb remix) – 7:52
4. "Starry Eyed Surprise" (video)

UK 12-inch single

A. "Starry Eyed Surprise" (Josh Wink re-interpretation)
B. "Starry Eyed Surprise" (Oliver Lieb remix)

UK cassette single

1. "Starry Eyed Surprise" (single edit)
2. "Starry Eyed Surprise" (Josh Wink re-interpretation)

European CD single

1. "Starry Eyed Surprise" (single edit)
2. "Starry Eyed Surprise" (Oliver Lieb remix)

Australian and New Zealand CD single

1. "Starry Eyed Surprise" (single edit) – 3:09
2. "Mortal" – 6:44
3. "Starry Eyed Surprise" (Josh Wink re-interpretation) – 8:43
4. "Starry Eyed Surprise" (Oliver Lieb remix) – 7:52
5. "Starry Eyed Surprise" (video)

== Credits and personnel ==
Credits are lifted from the UK CD single liner notes.

Studios

- Recorded at Real Noize (UK) and Real World (Box, Wiltshire, England)

Personnel

- Paul Oakenfold – writing, production, mixing, vocal recording
- Shifty Shellshock – writing (as Seth Binzer), vocals
- Andy Gray – writing, programming, production, mixing, engineering
- Fred Neil – writing
- Emerson Swinford – guitars
- Mark Ralph – guitars
- Jeff Turzo – additional production
- Carmen Rizzo – vocal recording
- Steve Osborne – vocal mixing
- Ed Chadwick – engineering assistant
- Michael Nash Associates – artwork design
- Matthew Donaldson – cover photography
- Anton Corbijn – Paul Oakenfold photo (back cover)

== Charts ==
=== Weekly charts ===
Chart (2002)	Peak position
Australia (ARIA)	37
Belgium (Ultratip Bubbling Under Flanders)	3
Europe (Eurochart Hot 100)	31
Ireland (IRMA)	21
Ireland Dance (IRMA)	2
Italy (FIMI)	48
Netherlands (Dutch Top 40)	19
Netherlands (Single Top 100)	53
New Zealand (Recorded Music NZ)	19
Scottish Singles Sales (Official Charts)	7
UK Singles (Official Charts)	6
UK Dance (Official Charts)	5
UK Indie (Official Charts)	1
US Billboard Hot 100	41
US Dance Club Songs (Billboard)	10
US Pop Airplay (Billboard)	13

=== Year-end charts ===
Chart (2002)	Position
UK Singles (OCC)	125
UK Airplay (Music Week)	41
US Mainstream Top 40 (Billboard)	70
