= Simon Monjack =

English screenwriter, film director and producer (1970–2010)

- Monjack in March 2010
- Born: Simon Mark Monjack; 9 March 1970; Uxbridge, Greater London, England
- Died: 23 May 2010 (aged 40); Los Angeles, California, U.S.
- Resting place: Forest Lawn Memorial Park, Hollywood Hills
- Education: Royal Grammar School, High Wycombe
- Occupations: Screenwriter, film director, producer
- Years active: 1985–2007
- Criminal charges: Credit card fraud; Scam
- Criminal penalty: 5 days imprisonment
- Spouses: Simone Bienne (m. 2001; div. 2006); Brittany Murphy (m. 2007; died 2009)
- Children: 2

Simon Mark Monjack (9 March 1970 – 23 May 2010) was an English screenwriter, film director, producer and make-up artist. He was the husband and later widower of Brittany Murphy.

== Early life ==
Monjack was born on 9 March 1970 in Hillingdon, Middlesex, to a Jewish family. He grew up in Bourne End, Buckinghamshire. He attended Juniper Hill School, Flackwell Heath, then Royal Grammar School, High Wycombe. When he was 16, his father, William (1949–1986), died of a brain tumour. His mother Linda (née Hall) is a hypnotherapist.

== Career ==
Monjack directed, produced, and wrote the B movie Two Days, Nine Lives in 2000. He received story credit for the 2006 biographical film Factory Girl about Warhol actress/model Edie Sedgwick. Director George Hickenlooper contended that "Monjack had nothing to do with Factory Girl" and that "he filed a frivolous lawsuit against us [...] making bogus claims that we had stolen his script. He held us literally hostage and we were forced to settle with him as he held our production over a barrel." Monjack denied these claims. In 2007, E! News reported that Monjack was slated to direct a film adaptation of D. M. Thomas's novel about Sigmund Freud, The White Hotel, with Brittany Murphy cast in a leading role, but the movie was never made.

== Personal life ==
=== Brittany Murphy marriage and controversy ===
Monjack married Simone Bienne in Las Vegas in November 2001; they were divorced in 2006. That year, he met actress Brittany Murphy. In April 2007, they married in a private Jewish ceremony at their Los Angeles home. The couple did not announce their engagement beforehand and rarely made public appearances together before their marriage. On 20 December 2009, Murphy died after collapsing in their bathroom. The cause was later revealed to be pneumonia, with secondary factors of iron-deficiency anaemia and drug intoxication from prescription and over-the-counter drugs.

Simon Monjack was a liar, a cheat, a thief, a sociopath, a con-artist and a narcissist, all wrapped up in one ball of dysfunction.

— Mark Ebner in the 2023 documentary Gone Before Her Time: Brittany Murphy

In the 2021 documentary What Happened, Brittany Murphy?, several of Monjack's colleagues and friends accused him of being responsible for Murphy's physical changes and also of not letting her connect with her family. According to the testimony of his ex-fiancée, Elizabeth Ragsdale, Monjack "was a disturbed individual who was used to conning people and Brittany was one of his latest victims." In the two-part miniseries, Ragsdale explained that Monjack told her that he was suffering from spinal cancer and needed shark cartilage treatments to recover. It was not until he abandoned her while Ragsdale was pregnant that she contacted Monjack's mother, Linda Monjack, and realized the story was fake. Linda, who was interviewed, defended her son in this regard, saying that he had developed extreme paranoia after the death from cancer of her own father, William Monjack: "I certainly don't think he went out and told people he had cancer. I think he believed it." Before Monjack met Murphy, he met filmmaker Allison Burnett at a dinner party publicly, where he told the assembled guests that he was a billionaire, had dated Elle Macpherson and Madonna, had a collection of Ferraris, and was dying of brain cancer until he purchased a treatment derived from shark fins that saved his life; however, these claims were later revealed to be lies. The media subsequently suspected that Murphy had been duped by a con man. Kathy Najimy recalled: "[People] were scared. Like, "Who was this man and what is happening?". "She wanted to marry him, and I said, 'Honey, that's not enough.'" Another reporter said that her friends and family tried to separate her from Monjack at one point, but their intervention failed. After that it was as if she "disappeared," according to her friend Lisa Rieffel: "Simon took her away. He made sure no one could get to her."

=== Legal issues ===
In 2005, warrants were issued for Monjack's arrest in Virginia on charges of credit card fraud, but the charges were later dropped.

In 2006, Coutts & Co bank successfully sued Monjack, who had been evicted from four homes, for $470,000.

In February 2007, Monjack was arrested and spent nine days in jail, facing deportation, because his visa to the United States had expired.

== Death ==
In January 2010, Monjack's mother, Linda Monjack, told People that her son was "unwell, and the doctors are carrying out tests. On whether he has a heart problem, it is not really for me to say, you must ask him, but yes, there have been health problems in the past. I believe it's common knowledge, and it's been in the press that he had a slight heart attack a week from Brittany's death."

Monjack was found dead on 23 May 2010 in his house in Hollywood, according to the Los Angeles County coroner's office. Law enforcement sources say the Los Angeles Fire Department was called there for a medical emergency after Murphy's mother, Sharon, found Monjack unconscious in the master bedroom around 9:20 pm, and then called 911. Paramedics arrived; Monjack was pronounced dead at 9:45 pm.

The coroner's report found the cause of Monjack's death to be acute pneumonia and severe anaemia, similar to the causes attributed to his wife's death five months earlier in the same house. He was buried next to Murphy at Forest Lawn cemetery in the Hollywood Hills.
