= Electra (band) =

- Origin: United Kingdom
- Genres: Latin house; downtempo
- Years active: Late 1980s–early 1990s
- Labels: FFRR
- Past members: Paul Oakenfold; Steve Osborne; Nick Divaris; Johny Rocca; Micky

Electra was a British electronic-music band, founded in the late 1980s by Paul Oakenfold in close collaboration with his friend Steve Osborne.

The band was made up of Oakenfold, Osborne, Nick Divaris, Johny Rocca and Micky. It released three EPs. The first one, "Jibaro", was an unacknowledged cover version of a rare Latin-funk song originally composed and recorded by Elkin & Nelson, a Colombian act based in Spain in the 1970s, which was a part of the original "Balearic beat" of the late 1980s.

== Discography ==
=== EPs ===
- 1988: "Jibaro" (reached number 54 on the UK Singles Chart)
- 1989: "Destiny" / "Autumn Love" (double A side single, reached number 51 on the UK Singles Chart)
