= Little Black Book (film) =

2004 film by Nick Hurran

- Theatrical release poster
- Directed by: Nick Hurran
- Screenplay by: Melissa Carter; Elisa Bell
- Story by: Melissa Carter
- Produced by: Elaine Goldsmith-Thomas; Deborah Schindler; William Sherak; Jason Shuman
- Starring: Brittany Murphy; Holly Hunter; Ron Livingston; Julianne Nicholson; Kathy Bates
- Cinematography: Theo van de Sande
- Edited by: John Richards
- Music by: Christophe Beck
- Production companies: Columbia Pictures; Revolution Studios; Blue Star Pictures
- Distributed by: Sony Pictures Releasing
- Release date: August 6, 2004
- Running time: 106 minutes
- Country: United States
- Language: English
- Budget: $35 million
- Box office: $22 million

Little Black Book is a 2004 American satirical comedy-drama film directed by Nick Hurran and starring Brittany Murphy, Holly Hunter, Ron Livingston, Julianne Nicholson, and Kathy Bates. Carly Simon makes a cameo appearance at the end of the film.

== Plot ==
Stacy Holt is an associate producer on a talk show hosted by the domineering Kippie Kann. Stacy believes that "luck is when preparation meets opportunity". Her boyfriend Derek appears to be the fulfillment of all of her wishes, despite his reluctance to commit or discuss his past relationships.

When Stacy brings home tapes of the show to study, Derek recognizes a guest, his ex-girlfriend, French model Lulu, but refuses to answer Stacy's questions about their relationship. Stacy confides in her co-workers Barb and Ira about her misgivings. Inspired by Ira's pitch about using PalmPilots—the modern-day "little black book"—to investigate a lover's secrets, Barb and Ira encourage Stacy to use Derek's to learn more about him.

Under the guise of possibly inviting Lulu back to The Kippie Kann Show, Stacy, Barb, and Ira question her about Derek. Lulu says she stole Derek away from his then-serious girlfriend Joyce, adding that their relationship was purely sexual. Back at her apartment, Stacy becomes increasingly insecure, listening to answering machine messages for Derek, looking through his box of mementos from former girlfriends and finally his PalmPilot. She finds pictures of two of his exes on it, Joyce and Rachel. Stacy makes a doctor's appointment to meet Rachel, whom she believes is a podiatrist.

Stacy discovers that Rachel is actually a gynecologist, and notices that she has pictures of Derek's dog, Bob, in her office. Pretending to do research for the show, Stacy interviews Rachel, who reveals that she and Derek share custody of Bob and still see each other occasionally.

Stacy then meets Joyce, and the two strike up a friendship, although Stacy feels guilty for befriending her under false pretenses. When Joyce receives a call from Derek, Stacy asks her about their relationship. Joyce admits to Stacy that she still hopes to reunite with Derek.

Stacy panics and shows Joyce the interview with Lulu where she brags how Derek only went back to Joyce because Lulu became bored with him. Devastated, Joyce ends her friendship with Derek. Stacy feels guilty for making Joyce so unhappy and wonders if her investigation did anything to improve her own relationship with Derek.

At The Kippie Kann Show, production prepares for the live show and Stacy is given lead responsibilities. She is thrust on stage, discovering that her investigations into Derek's past are, in fact, the topic for the day. Barb orchestrated the episode and invited Lulu, Rachel, Joyce, and Derek to the show. All are confused and hurt by the lies, especially Joyce and Derek. Stacy apologizes to the women and to Derek, tearfully breaking up with him and admitting that she is not right for him. She encourages him to reconcile with Joyce before quitting on air. Stacy goes backstage to confront Barb, who tries to defend her actions and congratulate Stacy on the episode's success. Stacy rebuffs her (to the live audience's applause) and leaves.

Interviewing for a job under Diane Sawyer, Stacy shares some of her experiences and eventually lands the job. On her way out, she is thrilled to meet her idol, Carly Simon.

== Cast ==
- Brittany Murphy as Stacy
  - Katie Murphy as Stacy (age 7)
- Holly Hunter as Barb
- Ron Livingston as Derek
- Kathy Bates as Kippie Kann
- Julianne Nicholson as Joyce
- Stephen Tobolowsky as Carl
- Kevin Sussman as Ira
- Rashida Jones as Dr. Rachel Keyes
- Josie Maran as Lulu Fritz
- Jason Antoon as Larry
- Sharon Lawrence as Mom
- Gavin Rossdale as Barista Random
- Dan Benson as Phillip
- Dave Annable as Bean
- Yvette Nicole Brown as production assistant
- Marshall Allman as Trotsky
- Ben Ziff as Frank
- Carly Simon as herself (uncredited cameo appearance)

== Reception ==
=== Box office ===
Little Black Book opened at number five at the North American box office, grossing $7,075,217 in its opening weekend behind Collateral, The Village, The Bourne Supremacy, and The Manchurian Candidate. The film ended its run with a domestic total of $20,698,668 and an international addition of $1,336,164, totaling $22,034,832 worldwide.

=== Critical response ===
The film received mostly negative reviews. On the review aggregator website Rotten Tomatoes, the film holds an approval rating of 21% based on reviews from 105 critics, with an average rating of 4.7/10. The website's critics consensus reads, "An obnoxious, awkward mix of romantic comedy and reality show satire." Metacritic, which uses a weighted average, assigned the film a score of 36 out of 100, based on 33 reviews, indicating "generally unfavorable" reviews. Audiences polled by CinemaScore gave the film an average grade of "B−" on an A+ to F scale.

Entertainment Weekly's Scott Brown awarded Little Black Book a D, stating, "The big climax isn't climactic, just hysterical and incoherent. Murphy, with her bug-eyed, love-me mugging, is simply too slight and gawky to play the Everygirl." Similarly, Carla Meyer of the San Francisco Chronicle gave the film a poor review, criticizing the script and acting.

However, the film received some positive reviews; Andrea Gronvall of the Chicago Reader praised the film's humor, rating the film three and a half stars. Roger Ebert awarded the film three stars out of four and praised Murphy's performance.
