= A Lively Mind =

Album by Paul Oakenfold

Studio album by Oakenfold
- Released: 5 June 2006
- Studio: Stamford Bridge Studios, Los Angeles; Thunder World Studios, London
- Genre: Electronica; house; trance; breakbeat; alternative dance
- Length: 62:13
- Label: Maverick (US); Perfecto (UK)
- Producer: Paul Oakenfold; Ian Green

Oakenfold chronology
| Perfecto Presents: The Club (2005) | A Lively Mind (2006) | A Lively Mix (2006) |

Singles from A Lively Mind
- 1. "Faster Kill Pussycat" Released: 21 March 2006; 2. "Sex 'N' Money" Released: 27 November 2006

Professional ratings
Aggregate scores
| Source | Rating |
|---|---|
| Metacritic | 40/100 |
Review scores
| Source | Rating |
| AllMusic | 2.5/5 stars |
| E! | C |
| Entertainment Weekly | B |
| The Irish Times | 1/5 stars |
| Los Angeles Times | 2/4 stars |
| PopMatters | 2/10 |
| The Skinny | 4/5 stars |
| Spin | 2/5 stars |
| Uncut | 1/5 stars |
| URB | 2/5 stars |

A Lively Mind is the second studio album from the English electronic music producer Paul Oakenfold, released on 5 June 2006 under the name Oakenfold. The album is the follow-up to Oakenfold's 2002 debut Bunkka. The single "Faster Kill Pussycat" features Brittany Murphy. Other collaborators on the album include Pharrell Williams, Grandmaster Flash and Ryan Tedder of OneRepublic.

== Reception ==
Critical response to A Lively Mind was negative. At Metacritic, which assigns a normalised rating out of 100 to reviews from mainstream critics, the album has received an average score of 40, based on 9 reviews. The album was nominated for the Grammy Award for Best Dance/Electronica Album in 2007.

== Track listing ==
All tracks are produced by Paul Oakenfold.

Standard edition
| No. | Title | Length |
|---|---|---|
| 1. | "Faster Kill Pussycat" (featuring Brittany Murphy) | 3:14 |
| 2. | "No Compromise" (featuring Spitfire) | 3:45 |
| 3. | "Sex 'N' Money" (featuring Pharrell Williams) | 5:58 |
| 4. | "Switch On" (featuring Ryan Tedder of OneRepublic) | 4:05 |
| 5. | "Amsterdam" | 5:40 |
| 6. | "Set It Off" (featuring Grandmaster Flash) | 4:17 |
| 7. | "The Way I Feel" (featuring Ryan Tedder of OneRepublic) | 5:25 |
| 8. | "Praise the Lord" | 4:13 |
| 9. | "Save the Last Trance for Me" | 7:49 |
| 10. | "Not Over" (featuring Ryan Tedder of OneRepublic) | 8:50 |
| 11. | "Vulnerable" (featuring Bad Apples) | 5:55 |
| 12. | "Feed Your Mind" (featuring Spitfire) | 2:56 |
| Total length: | | 61:07 |

"Not Over" is a remix and remake of the 1995 song "Not Over Yet" by Grace, Oakenfold's former band, featuring new vocals and lyrics.

== Charts ==
=== Weekly charts ===
| Chart (2006) | Peak position |
|---|---|
| Irish Albums (IRMA) | 67 |
| Scottish Albums (OCC) | 46 |
| UK Albums (OCC) | 57 |
| US Top Dance Albums (Billboard) | 7 |

=== Year-end charts ===
| Chart (2006) | Position |
|---|---|
| US Top Dance/Electronic Albums (Billboard) | 19 |

== Certifications and sales ==
| Region | Certification | Certified units/sales |
|---|---|---|
| Russia (NFPF) | Gold | 10,000^{*} |
^{*} Sales figures based on certification alone.

== A Lively Mix ==
A Lively Mix

Remix album by Oakenfold
- Released: 23 October 2006
- Label: Perfecto

Oakenfold chronology
| A Lively Mind (2006) | A Lively Mix (2006) | Greatest Hits & Remixes (2007) |

In October 2006, Oakenfold released the remix album A Lively Mix, containing remixes of eight of the songs from A Lively Mind.

=== Track listing ===
Standard edition
| No. | Title | Length |
|---|---|---|
| 1. | "Faster Kill Pussycat" (Club Mix; featuring Brittany Murphy) | 5:21 |
| 2. | "Save the Last Trance for Me" (Club Mix) | 5:33 |
| 3. | "Sex 'N' Money" (Club Mix; featuring Pharrell Williams) | 5:33 |
| 4. | "Vulnerable" (Club Mix; featuring Bad Apples) | 5:48 |
| 5. | "Not Over" (Album Mix; featuring Ryan Tedder) | 7:58 |
| 6. | "Amsterdam" (Club Mix) | 4:40 |
| 7. | "No Compromise" (Roman Hunter Mix; featuring Spitfire) | 6:46 |
| 8. | "Feed Your Mind" (Roman Hunter Mix; featuring Spitfire) | 8:01 |
| Total length: | | 49:50 |
