= Faster Kill Pussycat =

2006 single by Paul Oakenfold

Single by Oakenfold featuring Brittany Murphy

from the album A Lively Mind
- Released: 18 April 2006
- Length: 3:12
- Label: Perfecto
- Songwriters: Paul Oakenfold; Ian Green; Kelli Ali
- Producer: Paul Oakenfold

Oakenfold singles chronology
"Rubberneckin'" (2003)	"Faster Kill Pussycat" (2006)	"Sex 'n' Money" (2006)

"Faster Kill Pussycat" is the first single from British producer Oakenfold's second studio album, A Lively Mind (2006). The song features American actress Brittany Murphy's vocals and was co-written by singer-songwriter Kelli Ali (former vocalist of British trip hop group Sneaker Pimps). The title of the track is a play on the title of the 1965 film Faster, Pussycat! Kill! Kill!.

"Faster Kill Pussycat" peaked at number seven on the UK Singles Chart in June 2006, becoming Oakenfold's second top-10 hit in the United Kingdom. The single reached number one on the US Billboard Dance Club Play chart and number two on the Billboard Hot Dance Airplay chart. It also entered the top 20 in Ireland and New Zealand, as well as on the Australian ARIA Dance Chart.

== Music video ==
The music video, shot on the rooftop of a parking garage in downtown Los Angeles, features Brittany Murphy dancing with scenes of Paul Oakenfold as a DJ and a wild crowd. Directed by Jake Nava, it premiered on television in May 2006 and was a pre-loaded video on Microsoft's Zune.

== Track listings ==
US maxi-CD single

1. "Faster Kill Pussycat" (album mix) – 3:14
2. "Faster Kill Pussycat" (Roman Hunter mix) – 5:53
3. "Faster Kill Pussycat" (club mix) – 7:53
4. "Faster Kill Pussycat" (Nat Monday mix) – 6:51
5. "Faster Kill Pussycat" (Liam Shachar mix) – 7:28
6. "Faster Kill Pussycat" (Eddie Baez's Future Disco mix) – 8:42

US 12-inch single

A1. "Faster Kill Pussycat" (Roman Hunter mix) – 7:57
A2. "Faster Kill Pussycat" (club mix) – 5:53
B1. "Faster Kill Pussycat" (Nat Monday mix) – 6:51
B2. "Faster Kill Pussycat" (Liam Shachar mix) – 7:28

US digital download

1. "Faster Kill Pussycat" – 3:13
2. "Faster Kill Pussycat" (Roman Hunter mix) – 7:57
3. "Faster Kill Pussycat" (club mix) – 5:53
4. "Faster Kill Pussycat" (Nat Monday mix) – 6:52
5. "Faster Kill Pussycat" (Liam Shachar mix) – 7:27
6. "Faster Kill Pussycat" (Eddie Baez's Future Disco edit) – 4:36

UK and Australian CD single

1. "Faster Kill Pussycat" (radio mix)
2. "Faster Kill Pussycat" (club mix)
3. "Faster Kill Pussycat" (Roman Hunter mix)
4. "Faster Kill Pussycat" (Nat Monday mix)
5. "Faster Kill Pussycat" (Liam Shacar mix)
6. "Faster Kill Pussycat" (hip hop mix)

UK 12-inch single

A1. "Faster Kill Pussycat" (Roman Hunter mix)
A2. "Faster Kill Pussycat" (radio mix)
B1. "Faster Kill Pussycat" (Nat Monday mix)
B2. "Faster Kill Pussycat" (Liam Shachar mix)

== Personnel ==
Personnel are taken from the UK CD single liner notes.

- Paul Oakenfold – writing, production
- Ian Green – writing, additional production, programming
- Kelli Ali – writing
- Brittany Murphy – vocals

== Chart performance ==
Following the death of Murphy in December 2009, the song re-entered at number seven on the UK Dance Singles Chart. The song also entered the UK Indie Chart on the same week, reaching number 13.

=== Weekly charts ===
Chart (2006)	Peak position
Australia (ARIA)	44
Australian Dance (ARIA)	10
Czech Republic Airplay (ČNS IFPI)	51
Ireland (IRMA)	17
Netherlands (Single Top 100)	74
New Zealand (Recorded Music NZ)	19
Scottish Singles Sales (Official Charts)	8
UK Singles (Official Charts)	7
UK Dance (Official Charts)	6
UK Indie (Official Charts)	2
US Dance Airplay (Billboard)	2
US Dance Club Songs (Billboard)	1
US Dance Singles Sales (Billboard)	8

=== Year-end charts ===
Chart (2006)	Position
Australian Dance (ARIA)	46
UK Singles (OCC)	95

== Release history ==
Region	Date	Format(s)	Label(s)	Ref.
United States	18 April 2006	Digital download	Maverick	
United Kingdom	29 May 2006	CD	Perfecto	
Australia	26 June 2006	CD	EMI Music Australia	

== See also ==
- List of number-one dance singles of 2006 (U.S.)
