= Sex 'n' Money =

Single by Oakenfold featuring Pharrell

from the album A Lively Mind
- Released: 27 November 2006
- Genre: Breakbeat, hip house
- Label: Perfecto; Maverick
- Songwriter(s): Anthony Crawford; Ian Copeland Green; Paul Oakenfold; Pharrell Williams
- Producer(s): Oakenfold; Ian Green

Oakenfold singles chronology
"Faster Kill Pussycat" (2006)	"Sex 'n' Money" (2006)	"Firefly" (2010)

Pharrell singles chronology
"That Girl" (2006)	"Sex 'n' Money" (2006)	"Give It Up" (2007)

"Sex 'n' Money" is a song by DJ Oakenfold from his second solo artist release A Lively Mind, featuring the vocals of Pharrell Williams.

== Music video ==
The animated music video based on the fable of Cupid and Psyche, and directed by Christopher Heary, shows Cupid (seen in the CD cover) arriving next to a limousine to a party at "Club Perfecto". The club is full of silhouettes of woman dancing and doorways with half opened doors with hints of seedy goings on. Eventually one beautiful woman "Psyche" (non silhouette) follows Cupid and eventually starts a fight on top of the limousine as it moves through an infinite club. Cupid fires a machine gun that shoots golden coins. The woman fires her pistol, which shoots lipstick, that turns into lips, which grow hair and fangs. At the very end Cupid gets bitten by the fangs and the limousine they battle on explodes and both, Cupid and Psyche, lay in front of Graffiti covered wall that reads "What we desire Destroys US!".

== Track listing ==
- CD single
1. "Sex 'n' Money" (Radio Edit)
2. "Sex 'n' Money" (Benny Benassi Radio Edit)
3. "Sex 'n' Money" (Club Mix)
4. "Sex 'n' Money" (Benny Benassi Pump-Kin Club)
5. "Sex 'n' Money" (Benny Benassi Pump-Kin Dub)
6. "Sex 'n' Money" (Kenneth Thomas Distorted Values Mix)
7. "Sex 'n' Money" (Nat Monday Mix)

== Charts ==
=== Weekly charts ===
Chart (2006)	Peak Position
US Billboard Hot Dance Club Play	10

=== Year-end charts ===
Year-end chart performance for "Sex 'n' Money"
Chart (2007)	Position
Russia Airplay (TopHit)	174
