= Bunkka =

- UK cover

Studio album by Oakenfold
- Released: 18 June 2002
- Recorded: 2002
- Genres: Big beat; electronic; trip hop; trance
- Length: 51:45 (US); 58:27 (UK)
- Labels: Perfecto; Maverick; Warner
- Producers: Paul Oakenfold; Steve Osborne; Andy Gray; Carmen Rizzo; Jeff Turzo

Oakenfold chronology
Perfecto Presents Ibiza (2001)	Bunkka (2002)	Perfecto Presents: Great Wall (2003)

Alternative cover
- US cover

Singles from Bunkka
- 1. "Southern Sun" / "Ready Steady Go" Released: 20 May 2002; 2. "Starry Eyed Surprise" Released: 8 July 2002; 3. "The Harder They Come" Released: 10 February 2003; 4. "Hypnotised" Released: 15 September 2003

Professional ratings
Aggregate scores
Source	Rating
Metacritic	58/100
Review scores
Source	Rating
AllMusic	3/5 stars
Blender	2/5 stars
E!	A−
Entertainment Weekly	D
The Guardian	3/5 stars
Playlouder	3.5/5 stars
Q	3/5 stars
Resident Advisor	4/5
Rolling Stone	3/5 stars
Uncut	4/10

Bunkka is the debut studio album by English electronic musician and producer Paul Oakenfold, released under the name Oakenfold. It was released in 2002 under the Maverick label.

It is also Oakenfold's best selling album to date, with sales exceeding 1,000,000 copies worldwide.

In response to how his dance-focused audience would react to the album, Oakenfold said "I hope they realise that in any forms of music you need to push the boundaries. I've been inspired by all kinds of music, from hip-hop to guitars to dance, and hopefully the dance audience will understand that." The album was released to mixed reviews.

== Track listing ==
1. "Ready Steady Go" (featuring Asher D) – 4:13
2. "Southern Sun" (featuring Carla Werner) – 6:57
3. "Time of Your Life" (featuring Perry Farrell) – 4:17
4. "Hypnotised" (featuring Tiff Lacey) – 6:34
5. "Zoo York" (featuring Clint Mansell and Kronos Quartet) – 5:25
6. "Nixon's Spirit" (featuring Hunter S. Thompson) – 2:48
7. "Hold Your Hand" (featuring Emilíana Torrini) – 3:39
8. "Starry Eyed Surprise" (featuring Shifty Shellshock) – 3:48
9. "Get Em Up" (featuring Ice Cube) – 3:50
10. "Motion" (featuring Grant-Lee Phillips) – 6:24
11. "The Harder They Come" (featuring Nelly Furtado and Tricky) – 3:50
12. "Mortal" (Japanese bonus track also available on "The Harder They Come" single) – 6:42

== Personnel ==
- Paul Oakenfold – keyboards, programming, drums, production, mixing, vocal engineering
- Hunter S. Thompson – vocals, spoken word
- Emiliana Torrini – vocals
- Ice Cube – raps
- Tiff Lacey – vocals
- Asher D – raps
- Perry Farrell – vocals
- Nelly Furtado – vocals
- Tricky – vocals
- Carla Werner – vocals
- Shifty Shellshock – raps
- Grant Lee Phillips – vocals, background vocals, guitar
- Mark Ralph – guitar
- Phil Cordaro – guitar ("Ready Steady Go" and "Nixon's Spirit")
- David Rhodes – guitar ("Get Em Up")
- Emerson Swinford – guitar
- Christian Twigg (Spymob) – bass guitar ("Ready Steady Go" and "Get Em Up")
- Jamie Muhoberac – keyboards

Additional personnel

- Steve Osborne – production, programming, mixing, vocal mixing
- Andy Gray – production, programming, engineering, mixing
- Carmen Rizzo – production, engineering, vocal engineering
- Jeff Turzo – production, mixing
- Ed Chadwick – assistant engineering
- Pete Davies – programming, engineering
- Chris Blair – mastering
- Anton Corbijn – photography

== Song appearances ==
- "Ready, Steady, Go", appears in a number of the films, video games and other media, including: The Bourne Identity, Stormbreaker and Collateral, Tiger Woods PGA Tour 2003, DDR Ultramix Juiced, Las Vegas, an ad campaign for Saab and an episode of the TV series ALIAS. Oakenfold produced a Korean style lyrical version of "Ready, Steady, Go" for the film Collateral.
- "Zoo York" (which features a sample of Clint Mansell's Winter: Lux Aeterna and Bally Sagoo's Qurbani Qurbani) was used in the trailers for the films Sunshine and Babylon A.D..
- "Starry Eyed Surprise" has been used in television commercials for Diet Coke.
- "Get Em Up" is a reworked version of "Right Here, Right Now," which featured on the soundtrack to the film Blade II.

== Charts ==
Chart performance for Bunkka
Chart (2002)	Peak position
Australian Albums (ARIA)	47
New Zealand Albums (RMNZ)	35
UK Albums (Official Charts)	25
US Billboard 200	65
US Top Dance Albums (Billboard)	1
