= Groove Zone =

Short wave talk radio show

The Groove Zone is a short wave talk radio show on Radio Taiwan International (RTI), English Division, hosted since 2001 by Ellen Chu and Andrew Ryan, on the topic of life in Taiwan.

The show is broadcast on Friday night/Saturday in the English hour on RTI, and on Saturday online.
