= Brittany Murphy =

American actress and singer (1977–2009)

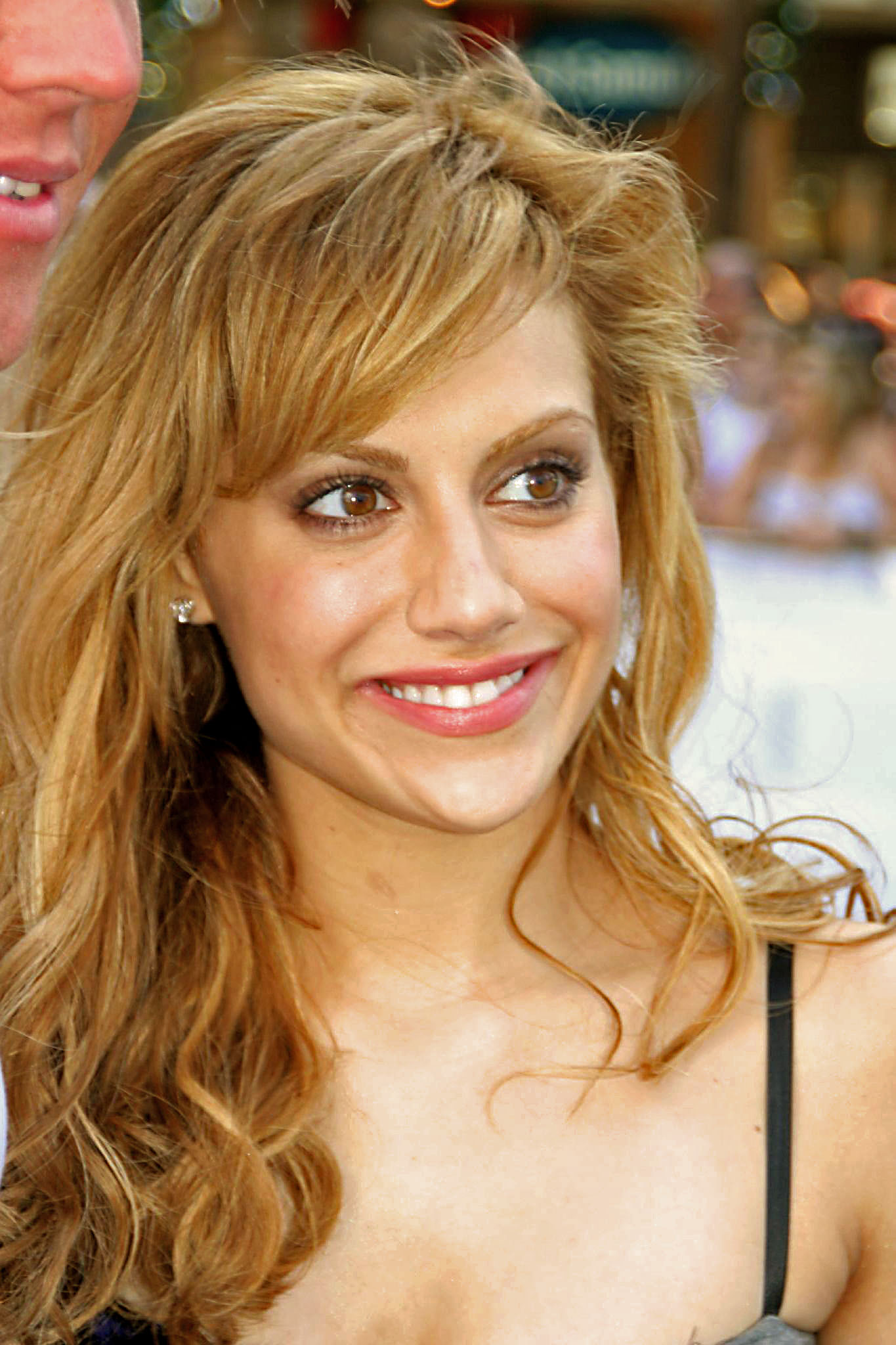
- Murphy in 2006
- Born: Brittany Anne Bertolotti; November 10, 1977; Atlanta, Georgia, U.S.
- Died: December 20, 2009 (aged 32); Los Angeles, California, U.S.
- Burial place: Forest Lawn Memorial Park, Hollywood Hills, California
- Occupations: Actress; singer
- Years active: 1991–2009
- Spouse: Simon Monjack (m. 2007)
- Musical career
- Genres: Pop; rock; electronic; hip hop; R&B
- Instrument: Vocals
- Formerly of: Blessed Soul

Brittany Anne Murphy-Monjack (née Bertolotti; November 10, 1977 – December 20, 2009) was an American actress and singer, noted for her work in comedy and drama. Murphy moved to Los Angeles as a teenager and began her acting career at the age of thirteen. Her breakthrough role was Tai Frasier in Clueless (1995), followed by supporting roles in independent films such as Freeway (1996) and Bongwater (1998). She made her theatrical debut in a Broadway production of Arthur Miller's A View from the Bridge in 1997, before starring as Daisy Randone in Girl, Interrupted (1999) and Lisa Swenson in Drop Dead Gorgeous (1999).

In the 2000s she played the patient Elisabeth Burrows in Don't Say a Word (2001), alongside Michael Douglas, and Alex Latourno in 8 Mile (2002), for which she garnered critical acclaim. Her subsequent roles included Riding in Cars with Boys (2001), Spun (2002), Just Married (2003), Uptown Girls (2003), Sin City (2005), and Happy Feet (2006). She also voiced the character Luanne Platter in the animated television series King of the Hill (1997–2010). On The Ramen Girl (2008), she served as a producer in addition to acting. Her final film project was Something Wicked, released in 2014.

She also dabbled in music, being able to sing and play the piano and trumpet from childhood. In the early 1990s she was part of the band Blessed Soul, alongside actor Eric Balfour. The band did not release an album. She featured on British DJ Paul Oakenfold's single "Faster Kill Pussycat" in 2006, and in the same year covered two songs, Queen's "Somebody to Love" and Earth, Wind & Fire's "Boogie Wonderland", for the soundtrack of the film Happy Feet.

On December 20, 2009, Murphy died aged 32, under disputed circumstances. The coroner's verdict stated that the cause of death was pneumonia, exacerbated by anemia and addiction to several prescription medications. Five months after her death, her husband, Simon Monjack, died of the same causes. The Los Angeles County Department of Health Services had considered toxic mold emanating from their home as a possible cause of death; however, Los Angeles Deputy Coroner Ed Winter stated that there were "no indicators" that mold was a factor. In January 2012, the actress's father, Angelo Bertolotti, filed a petition in the Superior Court of California asking that the Los Angeles County Coroner's Office release hair samples from his daughter for independent testing, claiming she was poisoned; the suit was dismissed. In November 2013, he claimed that a toxicology report showed that deliberate poisoning by heavy metals, including antimony and barium, was a possible cause of death.

Following her death, a series of biographical documentaries were made about her life. The Brittany Murphy Story—starring Amanda Fuller as Murphy, Sherilyn Fenn as her mother Sharon, and Eric Petersen as Monjack—aired on Lifetime on September 6, 2014. It received negative reviews from the media, who criticized Fuller's poor performance. In 2020, another documentary called Brittany Murphy: An ID Mystery aired on Investigation Discovery, in which the documentary filmmakers go into more detail about her death. A year later, the streaming service HBO Max released the two-part miniseries What Happened, Brittany Murphy? (2021), which featured several people close to the actress, including Kathy Najimy, Taryn Manning, Lisa Rieffel, and director Amy Heckerling. In 2023, the streaming service Tubi released a documentary called Gone Before Her Time: Brittany Murphy, which also explored her personal life and death.

== Early life ==
Murphy was born Brittany Anne Bertolotti on November 10, 1977, at Georgia Baptist Hospital in Atlanta, to Sharon Kathleen Murphy and Angelo Joseph Bertolotti, who divorced when their daughter was three years old. She was raised by her mother in Edison, New Jersey, (Note: Bertolotti was not named as her father on Brittany's first death certificate.) and attended middle school there before moving out west. Angelo during this period was arrested on charges of drug possession, later spending twelve years in prison; he had dealings with the Italian mafia, operating as an entrepreneur and diplomat for organized crime families. She later stated that due to Sharon's financial problems, she was food insecure and on certain occasions, she had to beg her mother to buy clothes at Kmart. This would later explain Murphy's marked social investment in homeless causes, as discussed in a February 2003 article in Glamour magazine.

In 1991, before she started high school, the family moved to Los Angeles so that Murphy could pursue an acting career. Murphy said her mother never tried to stifle her creativity, and she considered her mother a crucial factor in her later success: "When I asked my mom to move to California, she sold everything and moved out here for me. She always believed in me."

Murphy's mother is of Irish and Slovak descent, and her father is of Italian descent. She was raised a Baptist and later became a non-denominational Christian. She had two older half-brothers and a younger half-sister.

== Acting career ==
=== 1990s: Child acting and first roles ===
In 1982, she attended the Verne Fowler School of Dance and Theater Arts in Colonia, New Jersey. From the age of four, she trained in singing, dancing and acting until she moved to California when she was thirteen. In 1987, at the age of ten, she made her theatrical debut in a production of Really Rosie in which her performance was praised by her teachers; and she also sang in a production of Les Misérables. She stood out for being energetic when acting. She went so far as to say that "my first memories were wanting... to entertain people." She debuted in 1991 playing the role of Frank's sister in one episode of the television show Murphy Brown. She later got her first job in Hollywood at the age of thirteen, playing the role of Brenda Drexell in the series Drexell's Class. She then went on to play Molly Morgan in the TV series Almost Home. She appeared as a guest star on several television series, including Parker Lewis Can't Lose, Blossom, seaQuest 2032, Murder One and Frasier. She had recurring roles on Party of Five, Boy Meets World and Sister, Sister.

Her breakthrough role was in her second feature film, the teen comedy Clueless (1995), directed by Amy Heckerling, which developed a cult following. Filming began in November 1994, at which time she was barely seventeen years old, making her the youngest member of the cast. Her performance in the film was praised by both the media and critics: John Menter, an acting teacher during Murphy's childhood, said: "It wasn't until I saw her, sitting in the theater, who I felt she would be a huge star." During filming, as she could not attend high school, she had educational tutors. The film was a sleeper hit, grossing US$56 million against its budget of US$12 million. Clueless is a loose adaptation of the novel Emma (1815) by Jane Austen, and many of its characters have counterparts in the novel. Soon after, her mother Sharon was diagnosed with breast cancer, whom she was forced to take care of after the release of Clueless.

She made her Broadway debut in 1997 playing the role of Catherine, in a new version of Arthur Miller's A View from the Bridge along with actors Anthony LaPaglia and Allison Janney. She continued with roles in Freeway (1996), with Reese Witherspoon and Kiefer Sutherland, and the independent comedy Bongwater (1998). In 1999, she appeared as Rivkah in the television film The Devil's Arithmetic, based on the novel of the same name by Jane Yolen and directed by Donna Deitch; filming took place in Lithuania and Canada in October 1998. Her performance was praised by Variety reviewer David Kronke, stating that she "brought a strange but intriguing ethereal quality to her performance." That same year she had a supporting role in James Mangold's Girl, Interrupted, as a troubled psychiatric patient alongside Winona Ryder and Angelina Jolie. She was nominated at the Young Artists Awards for Best Young Lead Actress in a Feature Film for Girl, Interrupted, on March 19, 2000. She later starred as an aspiring beauty queen in Drop Dead Gorgeous. She voiced the character of Luanne Platter in the Fox animated sitcom King of the Hill for the entirety of the show's original run from 1997 to 2009, and Joseph Gribble until the fifth season. She later said that she enjoyed doing voice-overs because they could be done at home, jokingly saying: "You can do it even in your pajamas." She was nominated for an Annie Award for voice acting for the King of the Hill episode "Movin' On Up" in 2000.

=== 2000s: Acting success, decline and final works ===
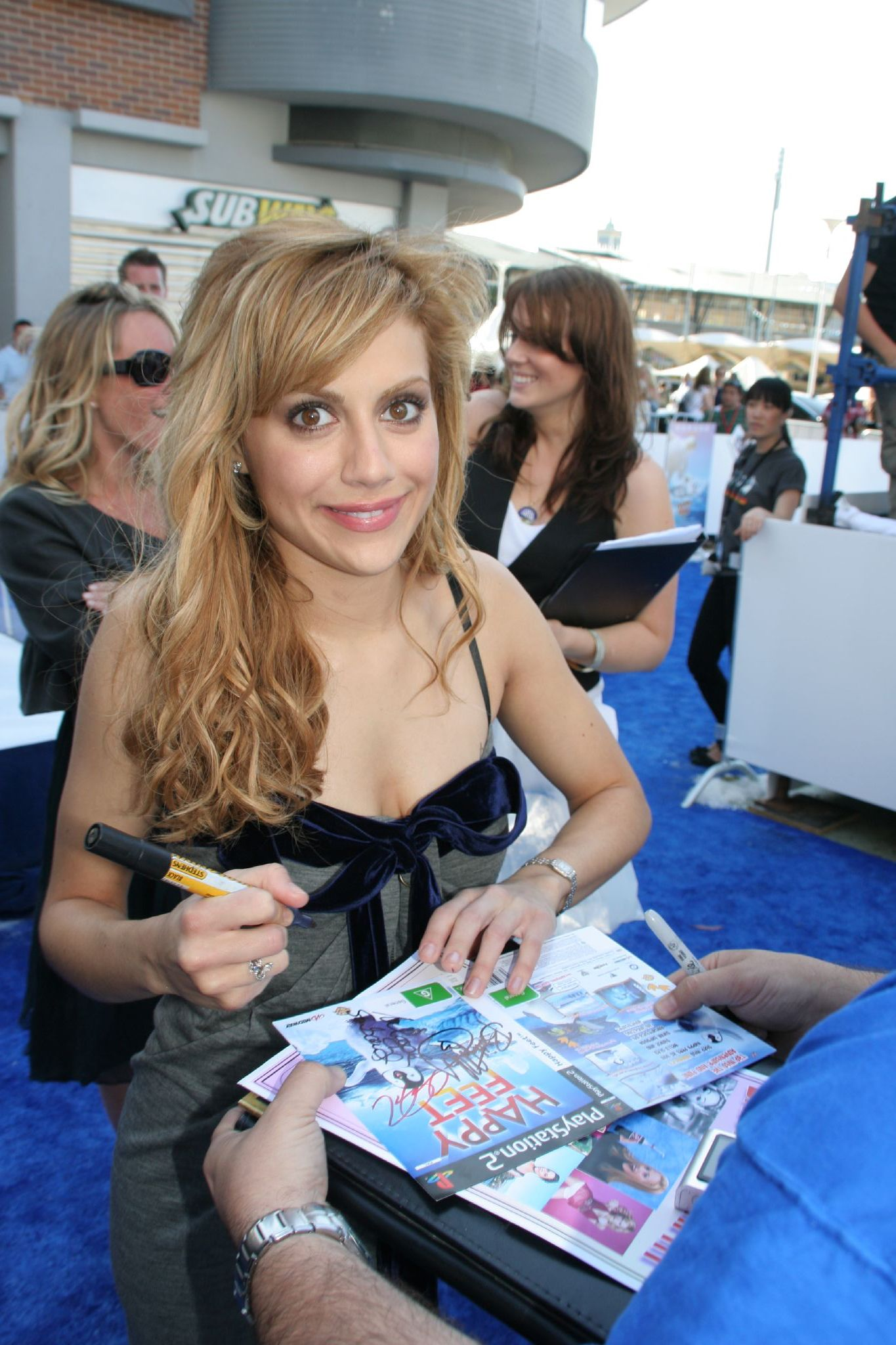
Murphy at the Australian premiere of Happy Feet in December 2006

She began the 2000s playing certain roles, with Jody Marken in the thriller Cherry Falls (1999), and the lead role in Don't Say a Word (2001) alongside Michael Douglas, whose critical reception was negative, but his performance was praised. In 2002, she played the role of Alex Latourno in the film based on the life of American rapper Eminem, 8 Mile, which received critical acclaim, and was a success at the box office.

She appeared alongside Dakota Fanning in Uptown Girls (2003), playing Molly Gunn, a twenty-two-year-old girl whose deceased father was a musician. (Note: After filming, she bought all the jewelry she used in the film.) Filming lasted from July to September 2002, and was filmed at Silvercup Studios in New York. In the same year she starred in the romantic comedy Just Married. The film did well at the box office, grossing more than 100 million dollars against a budget of 18 million, but it received negative reviews from both the press and film critics, which led to them appearing as nominees in the Razzie Awards for worst actor, worst supporting actress and worst on-screen couple for both. At that time her mother contracted breast cancer again, so Murphy had to take care of her again. A year later she played the lead role of Stacy Holt in Little Black Book (2004); this was another critical failure, for which reviewers focused on Murphy's poor performance. The film opened at number five at the North American box office, grossing US$7,075,217 in its opening weekend behind Collateral, The Village, The Bourne Supremacy and The Manchurian Candidate. The film finished its run with a domestic total of US$20,698,668 and an international addition of US$1,336,164, totaling US$22,034,832 worldwide. In 2005 she appeared in Sin City, directed by Robert Rodriguez, Frank Miller and Quentin Tarantino. Film critic Roger Ebert frequently praised Murphy's acting talent and comic timing, giving good reviews to several of her films and comparing her to Lucille Ball:

As for Brittany Murphy, for me, it goes back to the 2003 Independent Spirit Awards [where] Murphy was assigned to present one of the awards. Her task was to read the names of the five nominees, open an envelope, and reveal the name of the winner. This she turned into an opportunity for screwball improvisational comedy, by pretending she could not follow this sequence, not even after the audience shouted instructions and the stage manager came to whisper in her ear not once but twice. There were those in the audience who were dumbfounded by her stupidity. I was dumbfounded by her brilliance.

Murphy followed with several independent films, including Spun (2002), Neverwas (2005), and Karen Moncrieff's The Dead Girl (2006), as well as two Edward Burns films: Sidewalks of New York (2001) and The Groomsmen (2006). She returned to voice acting with the critically acclaimed 2006 animated feature Happy Feet, as Gloria Penguin. In 2009, she was cast in the Lifetime TV movie Tribute, as the main character, Cilla. Murphy completed the thriller/drama Abandoned in June 2009 and it was released in 2010, after her death. In November 2009, Murphy left the production of The Caller, which was being filmed in Puerto Rico, and was replaced by Rachelle Lefevre. Murphy denied media reports that she had been fired from the project after being difficult on set, and cited "creative differences". Something Wicked, her final film, was released in 2014.

=== Music career ===
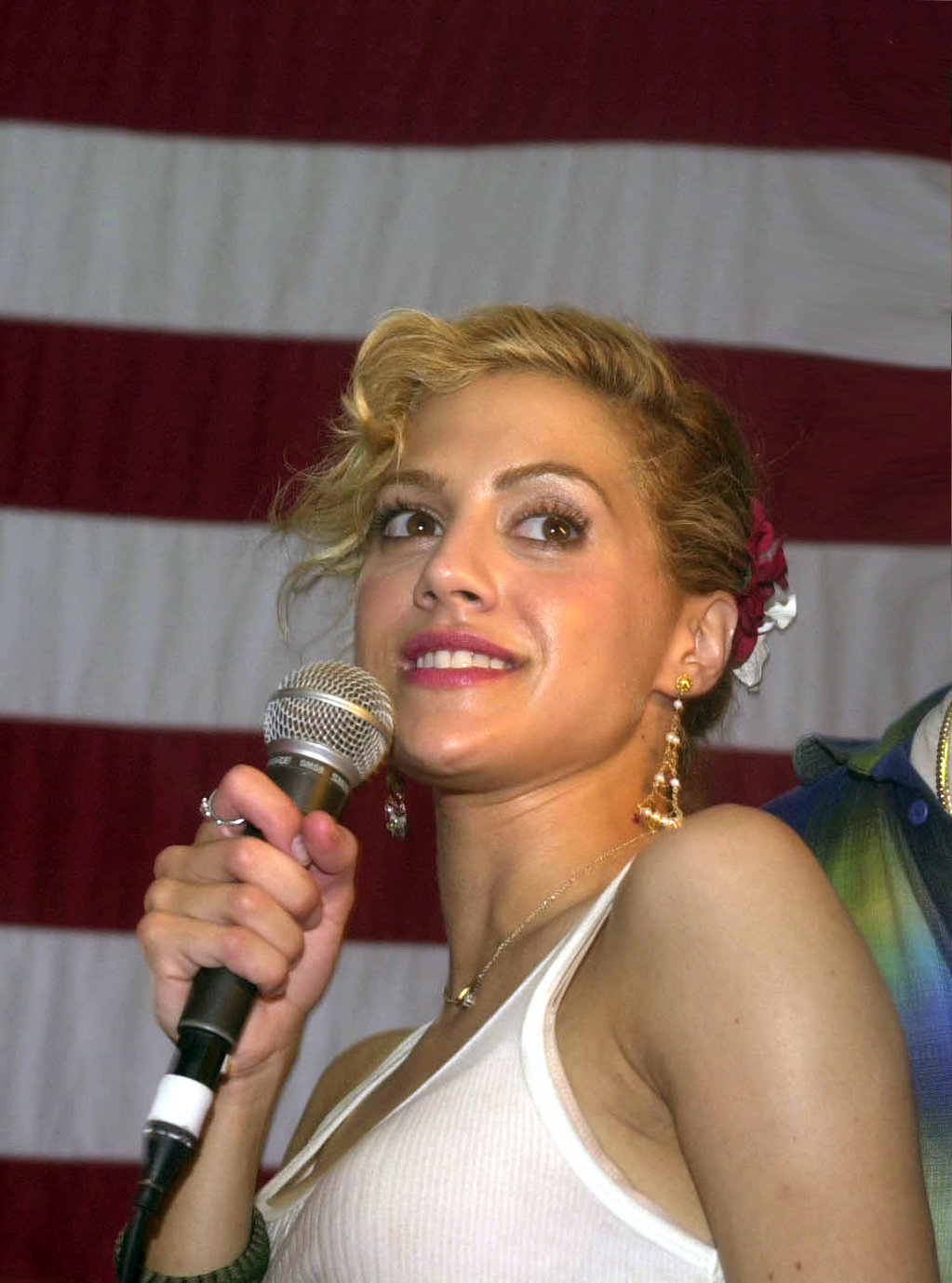
Murphy performing for the crew during a USO show aboard USS Nimitz on June 19, 2003

Murphy's career also included work as a singer. She was able to learn to play an instrument in just twenty minutes of practice, and learned to play the piano and trumpet at an early age. Regarding her voice, she commented: "My singing voice isn't like my speaking voice...I've just always kept it a secret and never taken credit because I wanted to learn how to work behind the microphone in a recording studio, and some of the singers don't even know it was me recording on their albums." In an interview she stated that her main musical influence was the American singer Madonna: "My dreams and aspirations when I was a child for as long as I can remember was to be an entertainer. I started out in dance classes and I've always sang for as long as I can remember. When I was nine I started doing musical theater in the New Jersey area, where I'm from. The quickest way to entertain more people was to audition for commercials and that was the first thing available since it was right over the Hudson River. Madonna had a quote, 'I'm going to change the world'–that was a huge inspiration to me so I decided I was going to be my own version of Madonna when I grew up". Plans to release a studio album were not carried out. She recorded unreleased demos that were never officially released, the song "Boomlay" was leaked on the Internet, it never completed and part of the recording was lost.

She was in a band called Blessed Soul with fellow actor Eric Balfour in the early 1990s. On June 6, 2006, Murphy and Paul Oakenfold released the single "Faster Kill Pussycat", from the album A Lively Mind. The song became a club hit and hit number one on Billboard's Hot Dance Club Play chart. It also hit number seven in Oakenfold's native United Kingdom in June 2006.

She dabbled in music again with the release of the film Happy Feet, in which she covered Queen's "Somebody to Love" and Earth, Wind & Fire's "Boogie Wonderland". Murphy said about her character, Gloria, "Oddly enough, of all the characters I've played, Gloria is the most like me. And she's a penguin! George Miller always wanted one person to do both [the speaking and the singing]. I said, 'I can sing,' and I asked him to give me a shot. I don't think he took me very seriously, because most actors say they can do most things."

== Personal life ==
=== Relationships and friendships ===
==== Kutcher, Kwatinetz and Macaluso ====
In late 2002, she began dating Ashton Kutcher, whom she met when they starred in Just Married. The director of the production, Shawn Levy, has commented on the relationship saying: "From the minute they met, they were together, they laughed all the time, they made jokes and they looked happy". It was later revealed that they had been engaged, due to both Kutcher and Murphy wearing rings, although it was never officially confirmed. She was engaged to talent manager Jeff Kwatinetz, but their relationship only lasted four months. She was subsequently with Joe Macaluso in December 2005, a production assistant she met while working on the film Little Black Book. Four months after the filming of The Ramen Girl, which was in April 2006, they broke up.

==== Winona Ryder ====
In the early 2000s, she was close friends with American actress Winona Ryder, who worked with her in the drama film Girl, Interrupted (1999). For the Los Angeles Times in September 2001, she was more open about her friendship with Ryder, where Murphy revealed that she called Ryder her "definitive mentor". Murphy said, "Before, I didn't know how actors managed to look so pretty. They have stylists, hair and makeup. I look at old photos of the premiere of Clueless and I look like a meatball on top of another meatball". During a television interview, Murphy along with Ryder got into a Mercedes car and kissed mouth to mouth, which led theories that Murphy was a lesbian, something she rejected. For People she remarked: "This was my presentation to the media, the cover of the National Enquirer". She also said that "we just kissed as a joke. I didn't know what to do because [the photographers] were in front of the car and it was either run them over or just stay there. Then I started making faces and suddenly I became Winona Ryder's lesbian lover". After Murphy's death, Ryder revealed to Total Film that she finds it difficult to watch the film after this event: "I can't watch the movie now. Her character commits suicide in the movie, I just can't. I was very close to Brittany, even in the moments before her death".

==== Eminem ====
After the release of the 2002 film 8 Mile, rumors about a possible romantic relationship between Murphy and her co-star Eminem began spreading. When she was asked on the Late Show with David Letterman if they had dated, she responded: "Yes, of course" and, laughing, added: "Well, it went. It came and went". Beyond speculation, it was later confirmed that the two had no relationship. In another interview with The Morning Call, she revealed that she was a big fan of Eminem: "I'm a fan of him... I think that he's very misunderstood." "He's brilliant...he's a brilliant guy," she continued. When the interviewer asked if the rapper was nervous during recordings with her, she jokingly replied, "You'd have to ask him. I don't want to appear in some song or something like that. I'm being careful." On another occasion, when asked if they had "something off screen," she responded: "I'll never tell." (Note: She took this phrase as a reference when she said it in the suspense film Don't Say a Word (2001).)

Eminem later revealed on Vibe that Murphy's death affected him greatly and that he was terrified of dying under similar circumstances. He also said that her death "was crazy. It's crazy because for a while we were close and she was a very good person. It's crazy when you see these cases, not just hers, but all the cases that have happened in Hollywood with people in music, in acting. Famous people. Famous people dying of overdoses at alarming rates and this almost sounds like advertising."

==== Simon Monjack ====
"Simon Monjack was a liar, a cheat, a thief, a sociopath, a con-artist and a narcissist, all wrapped up in one ball of dysfunction".

— Mark Ebner in the 2023 documentary Gone Before Her Time: Brittany Murphy

Months after her relationship with Macaluso, she met Simon Monjack, a British screenwriter. They met during the filming of The White Hotel, where Murphy played the role of actress and Monjack as director, however, the film was not released and its production was paused. In the 2021 documentary What Happened, Brittany Murphy?, several of Monjack's colleagues and friends accused him of being responsible for Murphy's physical changes and also of not letting her connect with her family.

According to the testimony of his ex-fiancée, Elizabeth Ragsdale, Monjack "was a disturbed individual who was used to scamming people and Brittany was one of his last victims". In the two-part miniseries, Ragsdale explained that Monjack told her that he suffered from spinal cancer and needed shark cartilage treatments to recover. It was not until he abandoned her while Ragsdale was pregnant that she contacted Monjack's mother, Linda Monjack, and realized that the story was fake. Linda, who was interviewed, defended her son in this regard, saying he had developed extreme paranoia after the death of his own father, William Monjack, from cancer: "I certainly don't think he went out and told people he had cancer. I think he believed it."

Before Monjack met Murphy, he was with filmmaker Allison Burnett at a public dinner, where he told the assembled guests that he was a multimillionaire, had dated Elle Macpherson and Madonna, had a collection of Ferraris and was dying of brain cancer until he purchased a treatment derived from shark fins that saved his life; however, these claims were revealed to be lies. As a result of this the media suspected that she had been deceived by a cheat. Actress Kathy Najimy recalled: "[People] were scared. Like, 'Who is this guy and what was happening?'", "She wanted to marry him, and I said, 'Honey, it hasn't been enough'."

Another reporter said that Murphy's friends and family tried to persuade her to break up with Monjack at one point, but her intervention failed. After that it was as if she "disappeared", according to her friend Lisa Rieffel: "Simon took her away. He made sure no one could get to her." The couple did not announce their engagement beforehand and rarely appeared together in public before their marriage. In May 2007, they married in a private Jewish ceremony in Los Angeles.

During the last three and a half years of her life, she, her mother, and Monjack moved in together in the same mansion that Britney Spears and Justin Timberlake had lived in, and she kept much of her old furniture.

=== Health ===
"You know? Someone very important in Hollywood said that I wasn't "fuckable" enough. He said I was "huggable" but not "fuckable". So I put some extensions in my hair and that made the difference".

— Murphy in 2000, talking about her physical changes for the Interview magazine.

In the early 2000s, Murphy lost a significant amount of weight, which led to rumors of a cocaine addiction or that she suffered from bulimia or anorexia. In 2005, Murphy disputed such claims to Jane magazine, saying: "No, just for the record I have never tried it in my entire life."

She appeared to smoke both in movies and in the making-ofs in which she appeared. A Rolling Stone journalist remarked that "she smelled of vanilla and apricots. She had a cigarette in her hand. .... After a while, she pointed out that this was only her third cigarette of the week and that, consequently, 'I don't smoke, and I'm not smoking!' But you are smoking. 'Oh, now', she said, as if only a dullard could think otherwise. ... even though she doesn't smoke and wasn't smoking, she lit her fourth cigarette of the week and began smoking it avidly, passing time in the bathroom until it was yummy time for her again." She had tried to quit her addiction and was against the use of marijuana, appearing in a fifteen-minute anti-smoking campaign for young people about not smoking to more than 10,000 schools as a complement to the educational program "Right Decisions, Right Now". She was also against the consumption of both marijuana and drugs. At the same time, she suffered from diabetes, according to her mother.

Actress Melanie Lynskey, one of her friends, expressed her opinion about Murphy's physical changes. For InStyle, she stated: "I was friends with Brittany Murphy, and the way she saw herself always broke my heart: the things she felt she had to change to be a successful actress." "She was perfect as she was, but people tried to present her as 'the fat one,' because when she was a very young teenager, her cheeks were a little round. People tell you that you are a particular thing, and it is very difficult to combat." The problem of her weight loss was such that she became weaker, unable to stand up on her own. The film director Trista Jordan recalled: "I've been around thousands of actors and I've never seen anyone that thin. Her elbows... And to get up from a chair she looked like Bambi."

== Death ==
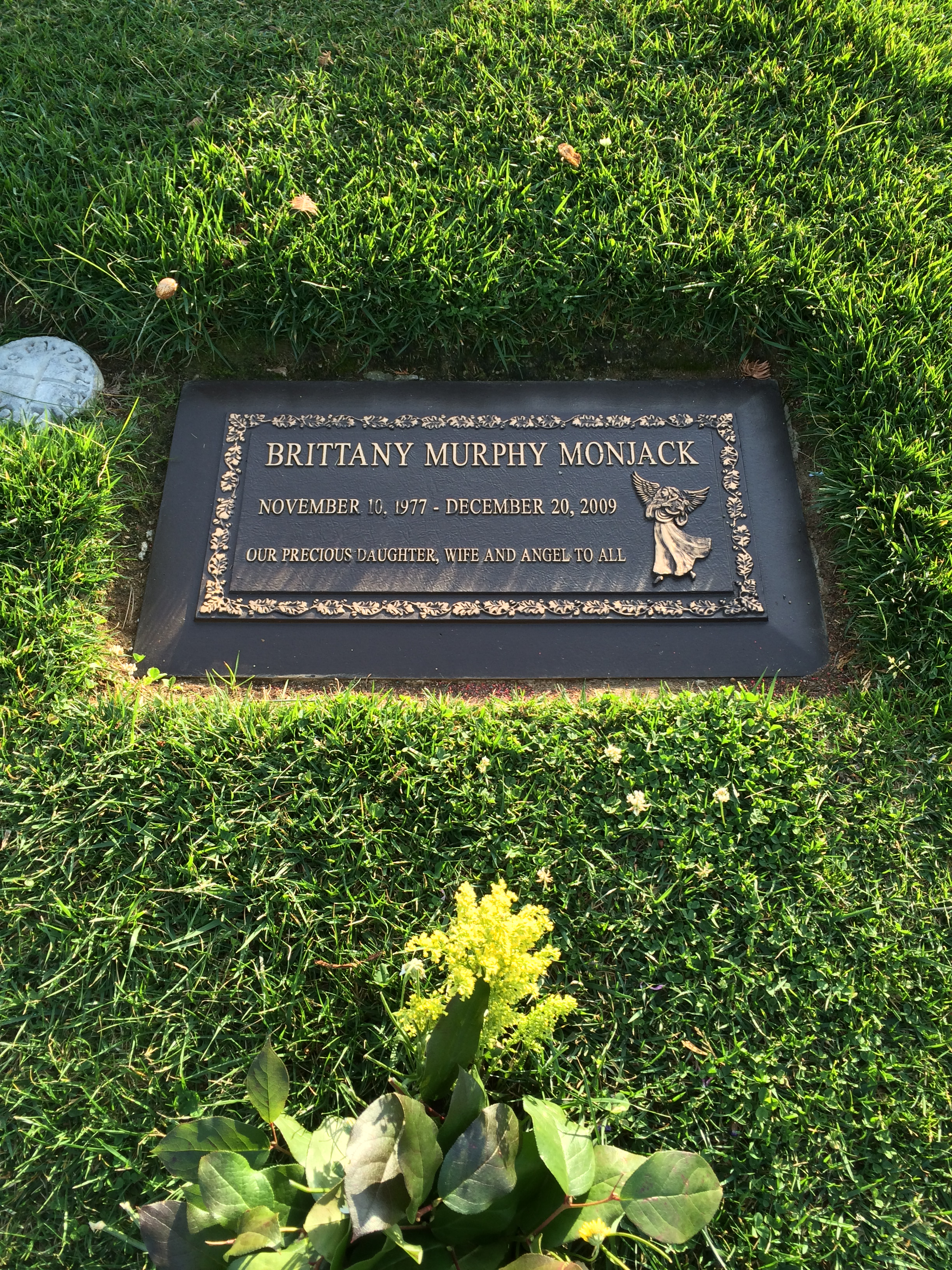
Grave of Brittany Murphy at Forest Lawn Hollywood Hills

At 8:00 a.m. on December 20, 2009, the Los Angeles Fire Department responded to "a medical request" at the Los Angeles home Murphy and Monjack shared. She had apparently collapsed in a bathroom. Firefighters attempted to resuscitate Murphy on the scene. She was transported to Cedars-Sinai Medical Center, where she died at 10:05 a.m. after going into cardiac arrest.

An autopsy was performed the day after she died. The Los Angeles County Coroner's Office, in a report issued February 2010, said that the manner of death was accidental and that the cause of death was pneumonia, with secondary factors of severe iron-deficiency anemia and multiple drug intoxication. The coroner found a range of over-the-counter and prescription medications in Murphy's system, with the most likely reason being to treat a cold or respiratory infection. These included "elevated levels" of hydrocodone, which is a narcotic; acetaminophen, L-methamphetamine, and chlorpheniramine. Hydrocodone requires a prescription while the others are over the counter. The report observed: "the possible adverse physiological effects of elevated levels of these medications cannot be discounted, especially in her weakened state." On December 24, 2009, Murphy was buried at Forest Lawn Memorial Park in Hollywood Hills. In January 2010, Murphy's husband, Simon Monjack, and her mother, Sharon Murphy, claimed that she did not use alcohol or other drugs, and that drugs did not cause her death; instead, they attributed it to a heart condition, mitral valve prolapse.

=== Death of Simon Monjack ===
On May 23, 2010, Monjack was found dead at the same Hollywood Hills residence. The coroner's report attributed his death to acute pneumonia and severe anemia. It was reported that the Los Angeles County Department of Health had considered toxic mold in their house as a possible cause of the deaths, but this was dismissed by Los Angeles Assistant Chief Coroner Ed Winter, who stated that there were "no indicators" that mold was a factor. Sharon Murphy described the reports of mold contributing to the deaths as "absurd" and went on to state that inspecting the home for mold was never requested by the Health Department. In December 2011, Sharon Murphy changed her stance, announcing that toxic mold was indeed what killed her daughter and son-in-law, and filed a lawsuit against the attorneys who represented her in an earlier suit against the builders of the home where her daughter and son-in-law died.

In January 2012, Murphy's father, Angelo Bertolotti, applied to the Superior Court of California requesting that the Los Angeles County Coroner's Office be required to hand over samples of his daughter's hair for independent testing. The suit was dismissed seven months later, after Bertolotti failed to attend two separate hearings. In November 2013, Bertolotti claimed that a toxicology report showed that deliberate poisoning by heavy metals, including antimony and barium, was a possible cause of his daughter's death. Sharon Murphy described the claim as "a smear".

=== Brittany Murphy Foundation ===
In January 2010, Murphy's mother, Sharon, and her widower, Simon Monjack, established the Brittany Murphy Foundation, a charitable fund for children's arts education, as well as supporting the USO and cancer research. The Foundation was launched on February 4, 2010, at a fundraising event at the Saban Theatre in Beverly Hills. After a records search revealed that the foundation's not-for-profit status had not been filed, the foundation refunded the donations received. In an official letter on the foundation's website, they stated that in an effort to get the foundation set up as quickly as possible, they had established it as a private foundation with plans to apply for nonprofit status later. However, they said that they had decided to wait until the foundation's nonprofit status was approved before going any further in order to truly honor Murphy and the foundation's charitable goals. On November 10, 2013, the Brittany Murphy Foundation was officially relaunched by her father Angelo Bertolotti, according to a press release posted at the foundation's website. As of early 2026, the Brittany Murphy Foundation appears to be defunct. GuideStar USA, Inc., an information service specializing in reporting on US nonprofit companies, reports that the Brittany Murphy Foundation has not appeared on the IRS Business Master File in months, which may indicate that it has ceased operations.

=== Documentaries ===
Years after her death, a number of biographical documentaries were made covering her career and death. In 2020, Investigation Discovery premiered an exclusive documentary about the circumstances of Murphy's death called Brittany Murphy: An ID Mystery, which raised a number of unanswered questions, with the documentarians suggesting that her then-husband, screenwriter Simon Monjack, and her mother, Sharon Murphy, may have contributed to her death. Her father appears in the documentary saying that he always believed his daughter's mother and husband were involved in both deaths, something she has denied.

On October 14, 2021, a two-part docuseries, What Happened, Brittany Murphy?, premiered on the streaming service HBO Max, which also covered the mystery of her death. Several celebrities who knew her were present, such as Kathy Najimy, Taryn Manning, Lisa Rieffel, and Clueless director Amy Heckerling. Several people speculated that Monjack was actually the one constantly controlling her, preventing her from hanging out with her friends. Reporter Amber Ryland, who interviewed Monjack after Murphy's death, said: "I was thinking, 'Am I sitting with a killer?'" "Could he have killed his wife?" Monjack's ex-fiancée, Elizabeth Ragsdale, said: "I think Simon Monjack, even if he didn't kill Brittany Murphy, allowed her to die because he didn't take her to a doctor and get her help, and I think he did the same to himself." People reporter Sara Hammel commented that "if it weren't for Simon Monjack, there's a good chance Brittany Murphy would still be alive." Following the premiere, Daniel Fienberg writing for The Hollywood Reporter called the documentary "20 percent a reminder of Murphy's transcendent talent, 30 percent a dead-end investigation into the mystery of her death, and 50 percent an unilluminating examination of Murphy's late husband", and concluded his review by saying that "[Murphy] deserved better than the media treatment she received, which likely contributed to [Monjack's] ability to control her the way he did." The docuseries was poorly received by critics. Review aggregator Rotten Tomatoes gave it a 19% rating and stated: "What Happened, Brittany Murphy? asks big questions about a beloved star, but lacks the grace and humanity to do right by its subject's legacy." Two years after the docuseries' release, Winter had died at the age of 73 of natural causes, and another streaming outlet called Tubi released Gone Before Her Time: Brittany Murphy, a new biographical documentary. It features Stacey Dash (her co-star in the cult film Clueless) among others close to Murphy.

== Legacy ==
Adam White, writing for Dazed on November 15, 2017, stated that "the actress was small, but magnetic, with the rare ability to seem completely approachable and terrifying. She had a big, bawdy laugh and acted with a manic mood mixed with breathless disbelief that things had turned out so well." He went on to claim that "she was the equivalent of dancing in your room to a Spice Girls song, or crying out loud at the end of a party after too many drinks", but that "she died too young to establish an adequate legacy, and quietly for posthumous super stardom." He again declared that "she was not pretty enough to be a female protagonist in an era in which lithe and ethereal Gwyneth Paltrow and Kirsten Dunst were the it girls of the moment."

After her death, a wide variety of friends dedicated words to her in interviews, recognizing her legacy and work within the film industry. Dakota Fanning, her co-star in the film Uptown Girls (2003), who maintained a friendship with her, said she appreciated the time they spent together both on the set of the film and at events they attended together, and that she was "very grateful to have had the opportunity to work together". The song "Faster Kill Pussycat", by British DJ Paul Oakenfold performed by Murphy, re-entered at number seven on the UK Dance Chart. It also entered the UK Indie Chart in the same week, peaking at number 13.

In 2023, Alicia Silverstone, who was also her co-star in Clueless (1995) and was one of her friends, commented on what it was like working with Murphy during filming:

I always remember when she auditioned for the part. It was the first time I was in a casting room where I was not auditioning. I was just there to help them facilitate chemistry reads. I just remember when she came in and did hers, because when she walked out of the room, I was like, "You guys! Did you see that?" As if they wouldn't know. They were like, "Yes, we saw that!" They were excited too, but it was my first time. She was just so good.

— Alicia Silverstone

== Filmography ==
=== Films ===
Year	Title	Role	Notes
1993	Family Prayers	Elise	Alternative title: A Family Divided
1995	Clueless	Tai Frasier	
1996	Freeway	Rhonda	
1997	Bongwater	Mary	
1997	Drive	Deliverance Bodine	
1998	Falling Sky	Emily Nicholson	
1998	The Prophecy II	Izzy	Direct-to-video release
1998	Phoenix	Veronica	
1998	Zack and Reba	Reba Simpson	
1999	Drop Dead Gorgeous	Lisa Swenson	
1999	Girl, Interrupted	Daisy Randone	
2000	Trixie	Ruby Pearli	
2000	Angels!	Nurse Bellows	
2000	Cherry Falls	Jody Marken	
2000	The Audition	Daniella	Short subject
2001	Sidewalks of New York	Ashley	
2001	Summer Catch	Dede Mulligan	
2001	Don't Say a Word	Elisabeth Burrows	
2001	Riding in Cars with Boys	Fay Forrester	
2002	Spun	Nikki	
2002	Something in Between	Sky	Short subject
2002	8 Mile	Alex Latourno	
2003	Just Married	Sarah McNerney	
2003	Uptown Girls	Molly Gunn	
2003	Good Boy!	Nelly	Voice role
2004	Little Black Book	Stacy Holt	
2005	Sin City	Shellie	
2005	Neverwas	Maggie Paige	
2006	The Groomsmen	Sue	
2006	Love and Other Disasters	Emily "Jacks" Jackson	
2006	Happy Feet	Gloria	Voice role
2006	The Dead Girl	Krista Kutcher	
2008	The Ramen Girl	Abby	Producer credit
2008	Futurama: The Beast with a Billion Backs	Colleen O'Hallahan	Voice role; direct-to-video release
2009	Across the Hall	June	
2009	Deadline	Alice	Direct-to-video release
2010	Abandoned	Mary	Direct-to-video; posthumous release
2014	Something Wicked	Susan	Posthumous release

=== Television ===
Year	Title	Role	Notes
1991	Murphy Brown	Frank's sister	Episode: "On Another Plane: Part 1"
1991–1992	Drexell's Class	Brenda Drexell	18 episodes
1992	Kids Incorporated	Celeste	Episode: "Lay Off"
1992	Parker Lewis Can't Lose	Angie	Episode: "The Kiss"
1993	Almost Home	Molly Morgan	13 episodes
1993	Blossom	Wendy	Episode: "Blossom in Paris: Part 1"
1994	Frasier	Olsen	Episode: "Give Him the Chair!"
1994	Party of Five	Abby	2 episodes
1994–1995	Sister, Sister	Sarah	6 episodes
1995	Boy Meets World	Trini Martin	2 episodes
1995	The Marshal	Lizzie Roth	Episode: "These Foolish Things"
1995	seaQuest DSV	Christine VanCamp	Episode: "Second Chance"
1995	Murder One	Diane "Dee-Dee" Carson	Episode: "Chapter Nine"
1996	Double Jeopardy	Julia	Television film
1996	Nash Bridges	Carrie	Episode: "Night Train"
1996	Clueless	Jasmine	Episode: "Driving Me Crazy"
1997–1998	Pepper Ann	Tank / Poison (voice)	2 episodes: "Sketch 22" (Tank) & "Presenting Stewart Walldinger" (Poison)
1997–2009	King of the Hill	Luanne Platter / Joseph Gribble (1997–2000) / Various characters (voice)	226 episodes
1998	David and Lisa	Lisa	Television film
1999	The Devil's Arithmetic	Rivkah	Showtime film
2000	Common Ground	Dorothy Nelson	Television film
2005	I'm Still Here	Voiceover	Documentary about The Holocaust
2009	Tribute	Cilla McGowan	Television film
2009	Megafault	Dr. Amy Lane	Television film
2021	What Happened, Brittany Murphy?	Herself	Posthumous release; archive footage

=== Video games ===
Year	Title	Voice role	Notes
1995	My First Encyclopedia	Space floor guide	Live action
2000	King of the Hill	Luanne Platter, Joseph Gribble	
2006	Marc Ecko's Getting Up: Contents Under Pressure	Karen Light	
2006	Happy Feet	Gloria	

=== Music videos ===
Year	Song	Artist	Notes
1995	"Here"	Luscious Jackson	
2001	"A Little Respect"	Wheatus	
2004	"Closest Thing to Heaven"	Tears for Fears	
2006	"Faster Kill Pussycat"	Paul Oakenfold	Also provided vocals on song

=== Stage work ===
Year	Production	Role	Location
1997	A View from the Bridge	Catherine	Broadway

== Awards and nominations ==
Annie Awards
Year	Category	Nominated work	Result	Ref.
1997	Best Individual Achievement: Voice Acting by a Female Performer in a TV Production	King of the Hill (as Luanne Platter)	Nominated	
2000	Outstanding Individual Achievement for Voice Acting by a Female Performer in an Animated Television Production	King of the Hill (as Luanne Platter in "Movin' on Up")	Nominated	
2004	Voice Acting in an Animated Television Production	King of the Hill (as Luanne Platter in "Girl, You'll Be a Giant Soon")	Won	

Awards Circuit Community Awards
Year	Category	Nominated work	Result	Ref.
1995	Best Supporting Actress	Clueless	Nominated	

Satellite Awards
Year	Category	Nominated work	Result	Ref.
2002	Satellite Award for Best Supporting Actress – Motion Picture	Don't Say a Word	Nominated	

Spike Video Game Awards
Year	Category	Nominated work	Result	Ref.
2006	Best Supporting Female Performance	Marc Eckō's Getting Up: Contents Under Pressure	Nominated	

Teen Choice Awards
Year	Category	Nominated work	Result	Ref.
2003	Choice Movie Actress—Comedy	Just Married	Nominated	
2003	Choice Lip Lock (shared with Ashton Kutcher)	Just Married	Nominated	
2003	Choice Movie Actress—Drama/Action-Adventure	8 Mile	Nominated	
2003	Choice Lip Lock (shared with Eminem)	8 Mile	Nominated	
2005	Choice Movie Actress—Drama	Little Black Book	Nominated	

Young Artist Awards
Year	Category	Nominated work	Result	Ref.
1996	Best Professional Actress/Singer	—N/a	Nominated	
1996	Best Young Supporting Actress in a Feature Film	Clueless	Nominated	
1999	Best Performance in a TV Movie/Pilot/Mini-Series or Series—Leading Young Actress	David and Lisa	Nominated	
2000	Best Young Leading Actress in a Feature Film	Girl, Interrupted	Nominated	
