= Carla Werner =

- Birth name: Carla Werner
- Born: New Zealand
- Origin: Los Angeles, California, United States
- Website: www.carlawerner.com

Carla Werner is a singer and songwriter from New Zealand who began her music career at age 11. At age 12 she won the New Zealand Junior Entertainer of the Year for country music, and went on to win the junior category of New Zealand's first televised talent show 'Telequest' in 1986, hosted by Mark Leishman and judged by Ray Columbus.

After migrating to Australia in 1989, and moving to Sydney in 1992, she joined The Cool Tin Box in 1994, a short-lived acoustic-rock quintet formed by Matt Rankin and ex Go-Between Lindy Morrison on drums featuring lead guitarist Tim Cooper. When they disbanded the following year, she and Cooper began performing together as an acoustic duo, before Werner went out on her own to perform original music. She often worked with Sydney-based musicians Dario Botolin (bass) and Lucius Borich (drums) and Chris Nelius (lead guitar).

Werner signed her first major record deal in 2002 with Columbia Records, Sony Music (New York City) and was followed by the release of her debut album Departure in 2003. To date, Carla has worked with producers, writers, musicians, and DJs all over the world including producers Ken Nelson (Coldplay) and Carmen Rizzo (Paul Oakenfold); collaborations with songwriters Glen Ballard (Alanis Morissette's "Jagged Little Pill") and UK DJ Paul Oakenfold, providing vocals and lyrics for the hit song "Southern Sun" which reached number one in the UK Dance Charts, prompting a performance on the (now defunct) "Top of the Pops" in 2004. With compositions appearing in film and television, including the Michael Stipe (R.E.M.) produced film Saved!, and what Sputnik calls "an extensive touring backlog with artists such as The Pretenders, Damien Rice, The Jayhawks, Howie Day, as well as special guest performer at the Jeff Buckley Tributes with artists Ed Harcourt and Jamie Cullum in London and Ireland in 2004", Carla has become an internationally acclaimed vocalist, writer and performer. Developing her own label OfOne Music in 2005, and releasing the first independent project from that label in 2006 with Pure Things in Wild Places. "My Lover's Ghost" was released in 2010.

While she has been compared to female singers such as Mazzy Star's Hope Sandoval, Heather Nova, and Margo Timmins of Cowboy Junkies, it is Jeff Buckley who is most frequently mentioned by reviewers.

Carla is now based in Los Angeles. As well as pioneering her own unique sound, she regularly frequents the collaboration world, more recently teaming up with UK DJs Loverush UK! for the release of "Give Me Your Love".

== Selected discography ==
- Carla Werner (1998)
1. "Enough"
2. "Momentarily"
3. "Piccolo Song"
4. "Good Lately"
5. "Duck Egg Blue"
6. "Kissing My Way"
7. "Something Beautiful"
8. "They Do"
9. "Untitled"
- Departure (2003)
1. "Heaven Is a Word"
2. "Wanderlust"
3. "Under"
4. "Love You Out"
5. "Enough"
6. "Departure"
7. "Like Mercury"
8. "Crimson + Gold"
9. "Make It Up"
10. "Even a River"
11. "Iodine Red"
- Pure Things in Wild Places (2006)
1. "Driftwood"
2. "Into The Night"
3. "Ghost Road"
4. "June"
5. "For The Moon"
6. "Edge Of Joy"
7. "Dovetails"
8. "Love Come Down"
9. "Ships"
10. "Space"
- My Lover's Ghost (2010)
1. "Second Best"
2. "Free"
3. "My Lover's Ghost"
4. "Something"
5. "You Can Follow Me"
6. "Shine"
