= Southern Sun/Ready Steady Go =

"Southern Sun" / "Ready Steady Go"

Single by Oakenfold

from the album Bunkka
- Released: 20 May 2002
- Genre: Breakbeat
- Length: 6:57 ("Southern Sun"); 4:13 ("Ready Steady Go")
- Label: Perfecto; Maverick
- Songwriters: Paul Oakenfold, Carla Werner, Carmen Rizzo, Jamie Muhoberac
- Producer: Oakenfold

Oakenfold singles chronology
"Planet Rock" (2001)	"Southern Sun" / "Ready Steady Go" (2002)	"Starry Eyed Surprise" (2002)

"Southern Sun" / "Ready Steady Go" is a double single produced by Oakenfold and released on 20 May 2002. Both songs also appeared on Oakenfold's album Bunkka, which was released the following month. "Southern Sun" features vocals by Carla Werner, while "Ready Steady Go" features vocals by Asher D. The remix of "Southern Sun" by DJ Tiësto appear on the single release and on DJ Tiësto's album In Search of Sunrise 3: Panama of the same year. The original version and various remixes have been included on over 70 compilation albums. "Southern Sun" is written in the key of E-minor while "Ready Steady Go" is written in the key of C♯minor.

== Music video ==
The song "Southern Sun" was promoted with a video that tells the story of a fashion model. The model faints during an outdoor photo session, then walks away from the session into a forest. There she recovers her lost youth and then travels into outer space in a scene reminiscent of the Stanley Kubrick classic 2001: A Space Odyssey.

== Licensing ==
"Ready Steady Go" has been licensed in a number of other media, including video games, TV series and high-profile movies. The track was used in the video games Tiger Woods PGA Tour 2003, DDR Ultramix, NFL Blitz Pro and Juiced, and in episode 1.18 of the television series Alias. It also appears in the films Stormbreaker (during the scene in which Alex Rider and Sabina Pleasure run across London), The Bourne Identity (during the famous police chase scene), the theatrical version of The Hot Chick and notably in a pivotal Korean nightclub scene in Collateral, for which Korean-language vocals were recorded in place of the original English vocal. This mix was subsequently titled "Korean Style". It was also used in the television program Las Vegas in the opening of the pilot. In addition it played as a central theme in the 2007 SAAB advertising campaign TV commercials, "Born from Jets."

The song once played in the queue for Reese's Xtreme Cup Challenge at Hersheypark, right after the rules of the ride are explained on small wall mounted television screens.

== Charts ==
2022 chart performance for "Southern Sun"
Chart (2002)	Peak position
Australia (ARIA)	55
UK Singles (Official Charts)	16
UK Dance (Official Charts)	2
US Hot Dance Club Songs	9

2025 weekly chart performance for "Southern Sun"
Chart (2025)	Peak position
Russia Streaming (TopHit)	93
