= Paul Oakenfold =

British record producer and trance music DJ (born 1963)

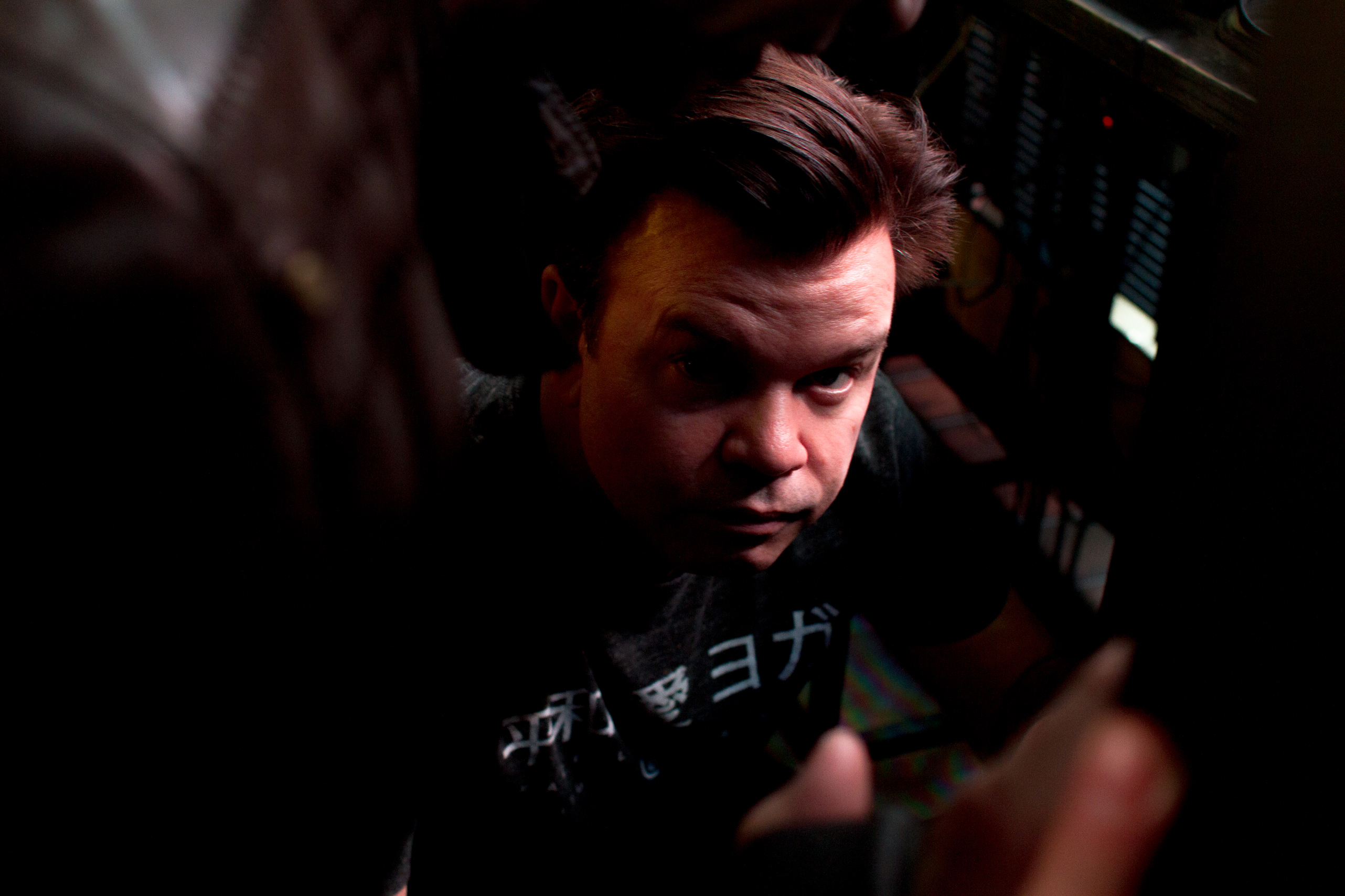
- Oakenfold in 2012

Background information
- Also known as: Bunkka; Electra; Elementfour; Perfecto; Perfecto Records; Perfecto Allstarz; Planet Perfecto; Rise; Virus; Wild Colour
- Born: Paul Mark Oakenfold; 30 August 1963 (age 63); Mile End, London, England
- Origin: Greenhithe, Kent, England
- Genres: Electronic; acid house; trance; Goa trance; breakbeat; big beat; dance-pop
- Occupations: Disc jockey; remixer; record producer; actor; chef
- Instruments: Synthesizer; turntables
- Years active: 1980–present
- Labels: Perfecto (UK); Maverick (US); Warner Bros. (UK and US)
- Website: www.pauloakenfold.com

Paul Mark Oakenfold (/ˈoʊkənˌfoʊld/; born 30 August 1963), formerly known mononymously as Oakenfold, is an English record producer, remixer, and electronic music DJ. He has created over 100 remixes for over 100 artists including U2, Moby, Madonna, Britney Spears, Massive Attack, The Cure, New Order, The Rolling Stones, The Stone Roses and Michael Jackson. Oakenfold was voted the No. 1 DJ in the World twice in 1998 and 1999 by DJ Magazine.

== Biography ==
=== Early life ===
Oakenfold was born on 30 August 1963 at Mile End Hospital. His father delivered the London Evening News. He lived in Highbury, Greenhithe, then Croydon, attending Archbishop Lanfranc School, then studied to be a chef for four years and worked at the Army and Navy Club. He was known as 'Oakey' growing up.

=== Early career: 1980 –1985 ===
Oakenfold describes himself as a youthful "bedroom DJ", stating he grew up listening to the Beatles, as his father was in a skiffle band.

Oakenfold's musical career began in the late 1970s, when he met British DJ Trevor Fung, who became his mentor. His first gig was in 1985, at a Covent Garden wine bar called Rumours; he filled in for a friend who was ill, and played tracks by Earth, Wind and Fire and popular British bands.

In 1981, Oakenfold and his friend, club promoter Ian St Paul, moved to New York City. Oakenfold worked as a courier in West Harlem. During this time, hip-hop was overtaking dance music as the most popular sound in the area (see 1984 in music). Joined by Fung, they used fake identification to sneak into various dance clubs like Studio 54, where they met members of the band Maze; Bobby Womack; and Bob Marley, whom they also interviewed, claiming to be NME and Melody Maker journalists.

Returning to London, Oakenfold began to get involved in the music industry, as an A&R man for Champion Records. Duing this period, he signed DJ Jazzy Jeff and the Fresh Prince, as well as Salt-n-Pepa, and appeared on Blue Peter with a breakdancing crew. He became a promoter and British agent for the Beastie Boys and Run-D.M.C., and would DJ at The Project in Streatham, playing soul and jazz music.

=== Perfecto Records and fame: 1985–1991 ===
In 1987, Oakenfold travelled to the island of Ibiza for a week to celebrate his birthday, joined by St Paul, Fung, Nicky Holloway,Danny Rampling and Johnnie Walker. Oakenfold convinced the owner of a venue in England to host an "Ibiza Reunion" party after-hours. He had previously made an attempt to organise such an event, but it had been unsuccessful as attendees were not yet familiar with the Acid house style the group had been hearing in Ibiza. By 1987, tastes had changed and the party was a success; it went on to become Spectrum, a regular acid house club night at Heaven in Charing Cross. The party was best known for the "Theatre of Madness", as more than 1,500 people were present on Monday nights, until it went down; with the financial issues it changed its name to the "Land of Oz". Artists like Alex Paterson DJ'd in the VIP chillout area known as the "White Room", which gave Oakenfold more free time, and then he began producing music under the alias "Electra" in 1988, alongside Nick Divaris, John "Johnny" Rocca and 'Micky'. As they continued releasing only four singles as the Balearic beat band Electra, in Full Frequency Range Recordings (FFRR Records) founded and run by Radio 1's Pete Tong, the duo created a new alias under the name Perfecto. Also in 1988 he decided to create a place where new artists could develop their careers. At that moment, Perfecto Records was born.

He collaborated with his friend Steve Osborne on various projects. In 1990, he worked with Terry Farley, Andrew Weatherall and Osborne on two remixes for Happy Mondays. The remixes of "Rave On" and "Hallelujah" were released on the Madchester Rave On EP, as well as "Step On", a cover version adapted from John Kongos' 1971 hit "He's Gonna Step on You". The song reached the top 5 position in the UK. He was invited as a guest DJ to Spike Island, a gig with the Stone Roses. Pleased with the last single, the Happy Mondays gave Oakenfold and Osborne the opportunity to produce their third studio album, Pills 'n' Thrills and Bellyaches. The album entered the UK charts at number one with pre-sales of 150,000. The album was named NME's 1990 Album of the Year, and both Oakenfold and Osborne won the 1991 Brit Award for Best Producer.

This is a tremendous record and a gauntlet chucked at all the other would-be legends in town... Wild, brash, corrosive funk rock, grimly northern and yet pan-cultural in a Tesco shoplifter kind of way.

— says NME in a 9 out of 10 review.

In 1991, they remixed Massive Attack's "Safe from Harm" as well as many others.

=== Tours and nightclubs: 1992–2000 ===
In 1992, when U2 released their song "Even Better Than the Real Thing", the Perfecto remix reached a higher charted position than the original song. In 1993 with the success of his last remix as Perfecto, he was hired by U2 to provide the warm-up sonics to their Zoo TV world tour, and replaced BP Fallon in the 1993 legs of Europe and Australia, New Zealand, and Japan, with more than fifty shows in Zooropa '93 and Zoomerang from 7 May to 10 December of the same year.

Also in 1993, Oakenfold and Osborne's project Grace was formed as State of Grace and featuring vocals by Patti Low, though by the time Grace had charted a number of singles in the UK charts (around 1996), it had become a 'solo fronted project' with jazz singer Dominique Atkins as the lead vocalist. The project was dissolved in 1997 as Oakenfold was touring as a performance DJ more frequently and could not commit to recording, though a remixed version of "Not Over Yet" was issued under the 'Planet Perfecto featuring Grace' name in 1999.

"There's no chance whatsoever. Seb Fontaine is our resident and is contracted until the end of the year. Paul will be doing some dates and playing Creamfields but that's it. I think his reason to leave (Home) had more to do with increased demands on his time in the US."

— said a spokesperson from Cream to nme.com.

"The reason he left was simply because he had so much on this summer and he felt it wouldn't have been fair to play one week and not the other."

— added an Oakenfold spokesperson.

"I disagreed with the way the club was going and it's time to move on."

— responded Paul Oakenfold.

In September 1994 and again in 1998, he teamed up with Steve Osborne and Ben Hillier to remix the Rolling Stones song "You Got Me Rocking" and Duran Duran's "Out of My Mind". He began producing his own tracks as well, continuing to remix songs from popular artists. He began using Goa music, fusing it with similar-sounding European tracks to create his own distinct sound. He took this to the mainstream in 1994 and created a pair of two-hour sets for BBC Radio 1's Essential Mix; the first of these was broadcast in the early hours of Sunday 20 March 1994, with the second being The Goa Mix broadcast on Sunday 18 December 1994. His album Perfecto Fluoro became the No. 1 essential dance collection of Boston Beat during 1996 with Jamiroquai's Travelling Without Moving.

On 9 June 1997, Oakenfold created Global Underground 004: Paul Oakenfold, Live in Oslo (GU004) which is a double mix CD in the Global Underground series. Compiled and mixed by Oakenfold, it is the first work he created for GU. The mix was recorded live at Cosmopolite Club in Oslo, Norway, as part of the official launch of the Quart Festival. It showcased Oakenfold's eclectic taste in music at the time, as the mix combines various forms of dance music. In 1997, Oakenfold mixed one disc of the double album Fantazia Presents the House Collection 6, a UK house music compilation series. Oakenfold became Cream's resident DJ from 1997 to 1999. During this time, he began to concentrate on the release of Tranceport in 1998.

In 1998 and 1999, Oakenfold took the first place in DJ Mag's Top 100 DJs. With the two-year contract as a resident in Cream, it was in 1999 that he released Resident. Two Years of Oakenfold at Cream. on Virgin. Thrive Records, the US distributor for early Global Underground releases had a different numbering scheme for the Global Underground albums; due to this Global Underground 007: Paul Oakenfold, New York (GU007) was released as (GU002) in the United States only. The compilation was released on 25 May 1998, with the US release on 19 January 1999. This was the second production from Oakenfold with GU and it contained trance, drum and bass, progressive house, progressive trance, breakbeat and downtempo. This became his last work with GU.

In 1999, he became the first DJ to play on the main stage at the Glastonbury Festival for 90,000 people, which he considers his favorite gig. He became resident DJ for the opening of London superclub Home, a role he performed until May the following year. Also in 1999, he moved to the United States where he went on tour.

In 2000, he created fourteen tracks of jazz, soul, house and Goa based styles with Mitchell Oakenfold. Twenty-four FX and scratches loops and sounds were included too, each consisting of six seconds; the album cover says "Only for DJs and Producers" and was released on Music of Life.

In March 2000, he teamed up with Steve Osborne, Andy Gray and Bruno Ellingham to remix Moby's song "Natural Blues".

Sometime before July 2000, he teamed up with Andy Gray to write and produce the theme for the Channel 4 reality show Big Brother under the name Elementfour. The series started airing on 18 July 2000, with the theme later released as a single. The programme and theme moved over to Channel 5 from 18 August 2011 to 5 November 2018.

In September 2000, he opened the new Digital Radio station Ministry of Sound Radio with a live mix from the famous London club.

Oakenfold appeared in the intro scene of EA's Euro 2000 video game, which featured him using his turntables to activate the video game and control various players. He also composed the game's soundtrack, which featured 7 tracks including a remix of the official anthem of the tournament.

=== Pioneer in the USA: 2000–2001 ===
After his success in Europe, one of Oakenfold's first major events in America was Fresno, California's Cyberfest on 22 July 2000. The 500 acre indoor and outdoor central California location had the biggest dance capacity ever in America. An estimated 80,000 dancers and music lovers from Seattle, Reno, Phoenix, Los Angeles, and San Diego were welcomed that day. Cyberfest 2000, also known as the "Festival Of The Future" featured other DJs such as Chemical Brothers, BT, and Carl Cox. Cyberfest 2000 paved the way for other major events in the area such as the Electric Daisy Carnival in Los Angeles in 2010.

In 2001, Oakenfold took part in the first Area Festival tour. This tour featured Incubus, Carl Cox, the Orb, OutKast, and the Roots. He later released a new compilation album, Perfecto Presents: Ibiza.

2001 also saw the release of the video game Frequency, for which Oakenfold produced one track, "See It".

Global Underground sold over 150,000 copies of Oakenfold's previous Global Underground: New York. A spokesperson for the label claimed that in the US, demand for UK dance music had been increasing in the past couple of years, and now made up over two-thirds of the label's sales. The Global Underground New York office opened in on Ninth Avenue in Manhattan. The Mekka Electronic Music Festival, otherwise known as the "electronic Lollapallooza" took place in ten cities in the United States and Canada during August and September, including New York City, Los Angeles, Toronto and San Francisco. The event featured Paul, Armand van Helden, De La Soul, LTJ Bukem, Josh Wink, Derrick Carter, Roni Size, Deep Dish, BT, The Crystal Method, Carl Craig and Überzone. Oakenfold next moved to Los Angeles to work on film soundtracks and to focus his DJing stateside. In 2001 he created the soundtrack for the film Swordfish, Swordfish: The Album contained a transformation of "Planet Rock" into a seven-minute breakbeat trance anthem. Most of the tracks are collaborations with Andy Gray, the remix of N.E.R.D.'s "Lapdance" which gained total notability from other tracks. The soundtrack was produced under Village Roadshow and Warner Bros. and distributed through London-Sire Records.

Oakenfold recorded a track with Crazy Town vocalist Shifty Shellshock at the end of the year for his new album. In an interview with Rolling Stone, Shellshock said that the track known as "Starry Eyed Surprise" was created after the pair met at a Crazy Town show.

I am a big fan of his music and we just kicked back and talked and said that we should do something. I already laid the rough vocals for it and (we are) going to go in right when I'm done with this tour and finish it.

— said Shellshock.

=== Bunkka: 2002–2004 ===
In 2002, Bunkka became his first official studio album when he signed to Maverick. The name Bunkka came from Peter Gabriel's studio in the UK, where the album was recorded. An extended play was released featuring live versions of four songs under Peoplesound Records. It is also Oakenfold's best selling album to date, with sales largely exceeding 1,000,000 (1 million) copies worldwide.

For the past 10 years I've been creating music under various different names, but I was never comfortable with putting out an Oakenfold record... It was, however, an idea that I'd been thinking about for a long time and Steve Osborne, my colleague in some of the production work I was doing at the time, kept putting pressure on me, saying "you should do it, you should do it". So eventually I felt it was time to make that record.

— said Paul Oakenfold.

"I'm a big fan of Nelly Furtado and she's on the record. She's got this wonderful way about her, she's extremely talented and a great vocalist. Most of all she's good fun, she doesn't take it as seriously as some people do."

"I'd always wanted to do something that represented my own musical background... I grew up on pop music, I love guitar bands and I was very influenced and involved in hip-hop during the early days, so I wanted to build from those roots upwards rather than doing a contemporary dance record."

— said Paul Oakenfold on several interviews.

The album features vocals from Jane's Addiction vocalist Perry Farrell on "Time of Your Life" and Shifty Shellshock of Los Angeles rock and rap band Crazy Town on "Starry Eyed Surprise"; Ice Cube on "Get Em Up"; and Tricky and Nelly Furtado on "The Harder They Come". The album contains appearances by Asher D of So Solid Crew on "Ready Steady Go", and Grant-Lee Philips, founder of the '90s Los Angeles rock band Grant Lee Buffalo is also included with Carmen Rizzo's version of his song "Motion". Bunkka also provided the start to three new artists, Carla Werner on the single "Southern Sun", Tiff Lacey on "Hypnotised" and Emiliana Torrini on "Hold Your Hand". Hunter S. Thompson's spoken words are provided on "Nixon's Spirit". Pakistani musician Nusrat Fateh Ali Khan's composition was adapted in an electronic version on the tracks "Zoo York". In 2002, Q magazine named Oakenfold in their list of the "50 Bands to See Before You Die". In 2002, Oakenfold revealed he had struggled with dyslexia as a child and announced his intention to help dyslexic children.

In 2002, Oakenfold remixed David Arnold's "James Bond Theme"; the song was released under Warner Bros. Records and was followed by the album's next two singles after "Starry Eyed Surprise", "Ready Steady Go" and "Southern Sun". "Southern Sun" with Carla Werner was first issued as a B-side of "Ready Steady Go" until it was included on Tiësto's In Search of Sunrise 3: Panama compilation with his own remix of the song. "Southern Sun" became a hit as it was then released as the A-side of "Ready Steady Go" in mid-2002. "Ready Steady Go" was featured in Saab commercials, the 2003 EA Sports game Tiger Woods PGA Tour, the THQ game Juiced, the pilot for the television program Las Vegas, and as the NASCAR theme song for 2006. It appears in the video game series Dance Dance Revolution in DDR Ultramix for the Xbox, the Fastlane episode "Dogtown" and the Alias episode "Snowman". "Ready Steady Go" was also listed as the number one song that makes you drive faster by UpVenue. Also in 2003, he remixed another hit soundtrack for 'Elvis Presley' which charted fairly well after his 2003 remix of "Rubberneckin'" made the top three in Australia and top five in the UK. This remix contributed to the Elvis phenomenon of the 21st century. In an earlier episode of Radio Free Roscoe, "The Imposter", a 2005 series on The N, a character Travis Strong DJed to the song, acting as if it were his own. It has also been used in the film adaptation of Anthony Horowitz's novel Stormbreaker, The Bourne Identity and it was reproduced with Korean lyrics for the film Collateral. The song has also been used during the performances of extreme freestyle water ski jumpers, and later became the theme song for the TV show TRL Italy from 2003 till 2005. The EP The Harder They Come was released on Perfecto and featured other works from Oakenfold and other artists. At the Creamfields event in 2002 at Speke Airfield, DJs such as Oakenfold, Seb Fontaine and Paul van Dyk performed along with Dave Clarke, Jon Carter, Richie Hawtin and Felix Da Housecat. The event also featured live appearances from Basement Jaxx, All Saints, Death in Vegas and Moloko. In 2003, Oakenfold released the fourth single of his album, "Hypnotised" which became successful enough to be included on his next compilation from the Perfecto Presents... series, Perfecto Presents: Great Wall which also included the Deepsky remix of the song as well as tracks like Motorcycle's "As the Rush Comes", Björk's "Pagan Poetry", UNKLE's remix of Ian Brown's "F.E.A.R." and Oakenfold's remix of Madonna's song "Hollywood". In 2003, Oakenfold produced a remix of "Pourvu qu'elles soient douces", a 1988 hit by French singer Mylène Farmer.

With the event of Creamfields that took place in 2004, Oakenfold released a compilation of songs he played during the event as well as tracks influenced by the environment and the vibe of deejays such as Paul van Dyk, Armin van Buuren, Ferry Corsten, Judge Jules, Fergie, Tall Paul, Eddie Halliwell, Chris Lawrence, Adam Sheridan, Shan, and Alex Kidd at the Cream/Goodgreef and Mixmag Arena.

=== A Lively Mind, Greatest Hits & Remixes, Vol. 1 and side work: 2005–2007 ===
In 2005, Oakenfold was contacted by the car manufacturer Toyota to create a free promotional CD available from aygo.com to promote a new Toyota car. The CD contained only seven songs which he worked on with Ian Green; the album was entitled Feed Your Mind.

I think the Hollywood Bowl was the most memorable experience. It's a very unique venue that never had a DJ play there before me. The likes of Frank Sinatra and the Beatles had performed there so it's a truly magnificent place – it holds about 15,000 – and it was a big achievement for me as much as Wembley and the Great Wall because it had never been done. After seeing that gig, Madonna's management were there and asked me to be the opening act for her on her 2006 tour, which also added to the experience!

— said Oakenfold in a Ministry of Sound interview.

During Oakenfold's career he has remixed a variety of songs from Madonna, like "What It Feels Like for a Girl", "Hollywood", "American Life", "Sorry" and later in 2008 "Give It 2 Me" from her album Hard Candy, Oakenfold went on tour with Madonna for two months opening her presentation in the Confessions Tour, previously he had supported her in 2004 at Slane Castle in Ireland. His sets lasted for an hour and a half, followed by Madonna's two-hour show.

Oakenfold remixed the Transformers theme as the theme song for the TV series, Transformers Cybertron. He also contributed with his single "Beautiful Goal" for the FIFA Football 2005 video game. His single "Ready Steady Go" was composed for the 2005 video game Juiced. His second studio album, A Lively Mind was released on 6 June 2006. Receiving unsuccessful reviews, the first single "Faster Kill Pussycat", a collaboration with the actress Brittany Murphy, was released on 2 May 2006; the second single was "Sex 'n' Money". Both songs stand out from the rest, as most of the album has a more trance-like feel. Gregory Jeffries from AllMusic stated the album might have been in the nominated albums of dance music in 1997 but not in 2006, as the album has guitars with disco sounds that might be only appealing to trance addicts.

"I've done so many remixes from the likes of the Rolling Stones to Snoop Dogg etc, but you can only get a certain amount on the CD. It was difficult for me but I had to choose what I wanted and what I felt were the best mixes that showcased my art in the best way."

— said Oakenfold.

In 2007, he played live at the Boston Pops which created a piece of orchestral music with electronic music. The event took place in Miami for 10,000 people with a 75-piece orchestra, he wrote a piece of music which he described as "difficult". In 2007 he was nominated to 2 International Dance Music Awards (IDMA) at the Winter Music Conference (WMC), Best Underground Dance Track for "Faster Kill Pussycat" and Best Full Length DJ Mix CD for "A Lively Mind". 2007 saw the publication of the first official biography of Paul Oakenfold, written by Richard Norris of The Grid and Beyond the Wizard's Sleeve fame. Paul Oakenfold: The Authorised Biography was published by Bantam Press on 24 September 2007. Oakenfold is a self-professed supporter of association football clubs Chelsea F.C. and Los Angeles FC. It was thought that he played a zombie in the movie 28 Weeks Later however this is incorrect, he was offered the opportunity but turned it down. He also scored the soundtrack for the 2007 Japanese CGI anime film Vexille.

In October 2007 he released his Greatest Hits & Remixes, Vol. 1 which features his best performance tracks. Oakenfold was a judge for the sixth and seventh annual Independent Music Awards. In October 2007 Oakenfold remixed Britney Spears' number one hit "Gimme More", which became the lead remix off the release. Oakenfold has created more than one hundred remixes, and has sold over 5,000,000 (5 million) long plays. He toured in British universities to promote his new album and autobiography. The tribute album was released in November in the United Kingdom with a 2-CD set and a 3 CD version with the same number of songs. It was also released in the United States with only 20 tracks in one CD; it featured some remixes from the original version but it also included two new remixes which are: Justin Timberlake's "My Love" song and his remix of Hans Zimmer's "Jack Theme Suite" which was used for the film Pirates of the Caribbean: At World's End. Exclusive 2008 remixes from Oakenfold were also included from Mark Ronson's "Stop Me" song, Radiohead's "Everything in Its Right Place", Eisbaer from Grovezone, "Missing" by Everything But The Girl and a remix of Paul's own "Southern Sun". Releases with Catalog#: UL 1602-2 included a DVD of live show and documentary. The compilation consists of tracks which influenced his career and musical persona, with artists such as The Cure, Happy Mondays, The Stone Roses, Massive Attack, U2, Olive, The Smashing Pumpkins, Madonna, and Underworld.

=== Pop Killer and film scores: 2008–2014 ===
In 2008, he released the last single from his last studio album, Not Over. This was a new version "Not Over Yet" which he produced while working with Osborne as Grace and in collaboration with Ryan Tedder from OneRepublic. The song was covered by Klaxons as "It's Not Over Yet". In 2008, Oakenfold worked on film scores for various films and television programs such as Californication, The Heavy, Fever, The Bourne Identity, and Speed Racer. In mid-July Oakenfold ended his world tour promoting his greatest hits album. He also joined Madonna again in her Sticky & Sweet Tour in London, Santiago, Buenos Aires, Rio de Janeiro and São Paulo. After touring, he began his residency in Las Vegas on 30 August. In the fall of 2008, he started his first Resident DJ position in the United States. "Paul Oakenfold Presents: Perfecto Las Vegas" was conceptualized specifically for Rain Nightclub, the legendary 25,000-square-foot (2,300 m^{2}) nightclub and concert venue at the Palms Casino Resort known for its special effects and international headliner acts. From July to August 2009, he again opened Madonna's concerts for the Sticky & Sweet Tour in Europe. In 2009 Paul's third studio album was announced to be actually named Pop Killer, and not Decade of Dance as the article from The Sun stated.

He also worked with Madonna on her third greatest hits collection, Celebration, and her final release with Warner Bros. Records. The first single was released on 3 August 2009, it is also titled "Celebration" and was produced by Oakenfold. He also remixed a past demo "It's So Cool" from American Life, and it is included as a bonus track on iTunes.

Oakenfold remixed a song called "Firefly" from the Matt Goss album Gossy. In 2010, Oakenfold returned to the US as a DJ at Rain Nightclub.

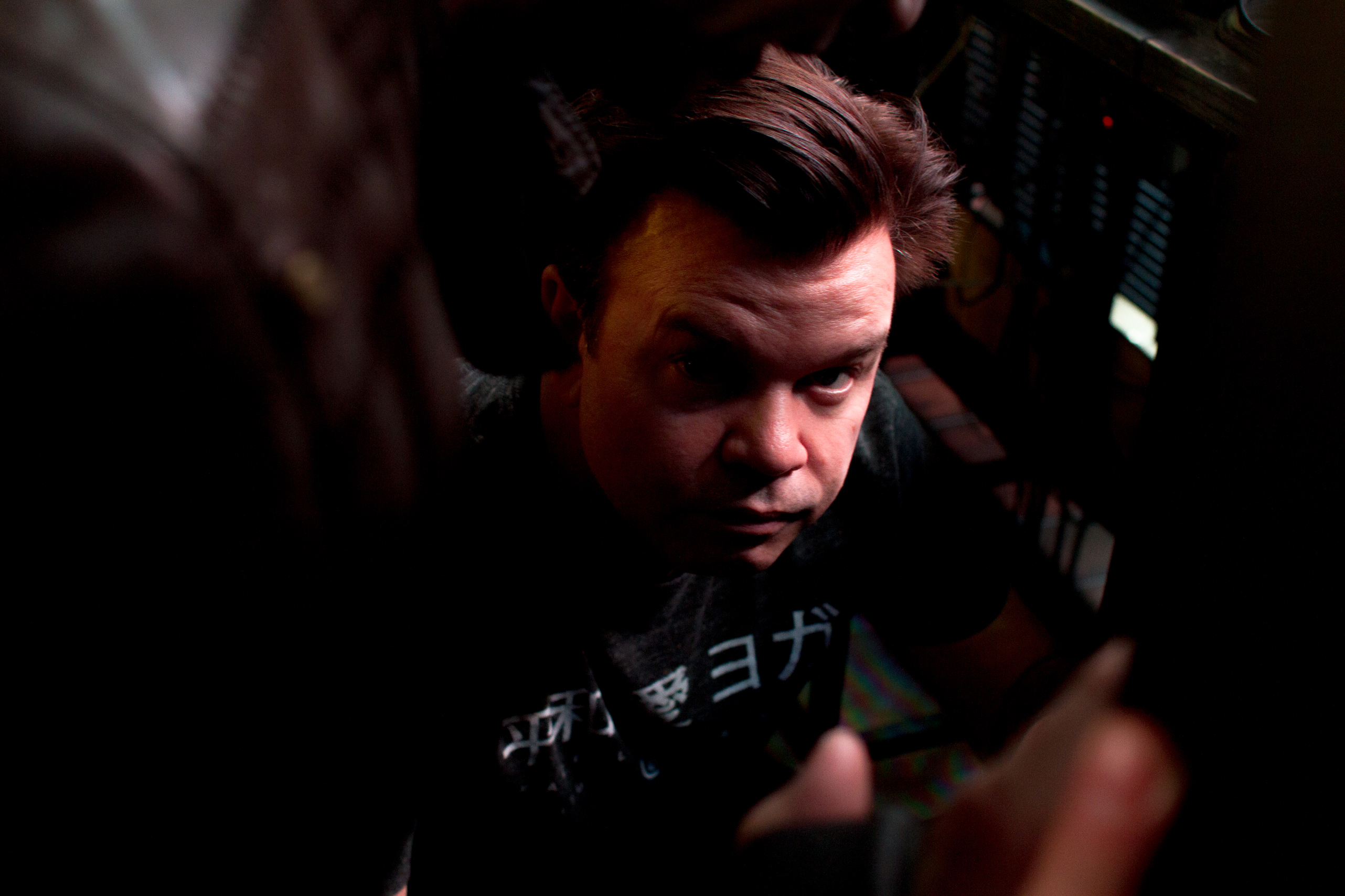
Paul Oakenfold at Sutra, OC California, in 2012

In February 2012 Oakenfold headlined a huge one-off event for club brand Goodgreef at the famous Tall Trees venue in the UK. Later in the year, he performed alongside Californian band Train at the Google I/O June 2012 After Party at Moscone Center in San Francisco.

In 2014, Oakenfold remixed A3's single "Come with Me".

Oakenfold co-wrote a song for Cher's twenty-fifth studio album Closer to the Truth: "Woman's World". It was released on 18 June 2013 as the album's lead-single.

Oakenfold remixed a song by British pop singer Sophie Ellis-Bextor and up-and-coming new electronic project DedRekoning on their single "Only Child", released on 8 September 2014 through Oakenfold's label Perfecto Records.

=== 2015–present ===
Since May 2015, Paul is heading the department of DJs and EDM vocalists at Isina, a worldwide talent search and development mentorship program. On September 25, 2020, Oakenfold launched the English-language electronic single, "The Perfect Song" featuring Mexican pop icon Fey, to celebrate the 25th anniversary of her career. His album Shine On is set to be released in 2022.

Oakenfold was the opening act for the Pet Shop Boys and New Order Unity Tour in September and October 2022.

== Legal issues ==
On 2 June 2023, a lawsuit was filed against Oakenfold in the Los Angeles Superior Court by his former personal assistant, accusing him of sexual harassment. He has denied the allegations.

== Discography ==
Studio albums

- Bunkka (2002)
- A Lively Mind (2006)
- Trance Mission (2014)
- Shine On (2022)

== Filmography ==
- 2002 The Rules of Attraction (Himself)
- 2003 Dancestar USA 2003 (Himself)
- 2003 No Cover (Guest)
- 2003 MTV Europe Music Awards 2003 (Himself)
- 2004 The Club (Himself)
- 2007 Post Military Trip (Guest)
- 2012 Dark Hearts (2012) (Dj)
- 2016 Sundown (2016) (Himself)
- 2022 Who Killed the KLF? (Himself)
- 2024 Point of Change (exec producer and sound mixer)

== Awards and nominations ==
=== BMI Awards ===
The BMI Awards are annual award ceremonies for songwriters in various genres organized by Broadcast Music, Inc. Oakenfold won the Film Award for Music the 2001 movie Swordfish.

Year	Nominee / work	Award	Result
2002	Paul Oakenfold	The BMI Film Music Award, for Swordfish	Won

=== BMI London Awards ===
Year	Nominee / work	Award	Result	Ref.
2003	"Starry Eyed Surprise"	Pop Award	Won	

=== DJ Awards ===
Oakenfold has won the DJ Awards for Best Trance DJ Award two times, and received eleven nominations. He won the Best Techno DJ Award once and he was honored with an "Outstanding Contribution Award" in 2004.

Year	Nominee / work	Award	Result
1999	Paul Oakenfold	Best Techno DJ	Won
2000	Paul Oakenfold	Best Trance DJ	Won
2001	Paul Oakenfold	Best Trance DJ	Nominated
2004	Paul Oakenfold	Outstanding Contribution	Won
2004	Paul Oakenfold	Best Trance DJ	Won
2005	Paul Oakenfold	Best Trance DJ	Nominated
2006	Paul Oakenfold	Best Trance DJ	Nominated
2008	Paul Oakenfold	Best Trance DJ	Nominated
2009	Paul Oakenfold	Best Trance DJ	Nominated
2010	Paul Oakenfold	Best Trance DJ	Nominated
2011	Paul Oakenfold	Best Trance DJ	Nominated
2012	Paul Oakenfold	Best Trance DJ	Nominated
2013	Paul Oakenfold	Best Trance DJ	Nominated

=== DJ Magazine Award ===
Oakenfold has been named Worlds Best DJ two times by DJ Magazine.

Year	Nominee / work	Award	Result
1997	Paul Oakenfold	World's Top 100 DJs	2
1998	Paul Oakenfold	World's Top 100 DJs	1
1999	Paul Oakenfold	World's Top 100 DJs	1
2000	Paul Oakenfold	World's Top 100 DJs	2
2001	Paul Oakenfold	World's Top 100 DJs	5
2002	Paul Oakenfold	World's Top 100 DJs	6
2003	Paul Oakenfold	World's Top 100 DJs	8
2004	Paul Oakenfold	World's Top 100 DJs	9
2005	Paul Oakenfold	World's Top 100 DJs	11
2006	Paul Oakenfold	World's Top 100 DJs	14
2007	Paul Oakenfold	World's Top 100 DJs	12
2008	Paul Oakenfold	World's Top 100 DJs	14
2009	Paul Oakenfold	World's Top 100 DJs	23
2010	Paul Oakenfold	World's Top 100 DJs	51
2011	Paul Oakenfold	World's Top 100 DJs	69
2012	Paul Oakenfold	World's Top 100 DJs	69
2013	Paul Oakenfold	World's Top 100 DJs	92
2014	Paul Oakenfold	World's Top 100 DJs	Exit (134)
Hiatus
2017	Paul Oakenfold	World's Top 100 DJs	Out (138)
2018	Paul Oakenfold	World's Top 100 DJs	Out (129)
2019	Paul Oakenfold	World's Top 100 DJs	Out (105)

=== Grammy Awards ===
Oakenfold has received three Grammy Award nominations.

Year	Nominated work	Category	Result
2005 Grammy Awards	for "Creamfields"	Best Electronic/Dance Album	Nominated
2007 Grammy Awards	for "A Lively Mind"	Best Electronic/Dance Album	Nominated
2010 Grammy Awards	shared with Madonna, and Demacio Castellon for "Celebration"	Best Dance Recording	Nominated

=== IDMA Awards ===
Oakenfold has been nominated for IDMA one time.

Year	Nominee / work	Award	Result
2007	Paul Oakenfold for "Faster Kill Pussycat" shared with Brittany Murphy.	Best Underground Dance Track	Nominated

=== World Music Awards ===
Oakenfold has received two nominations at World Music Awards.

Year	Nominee / work	Award	Result
2006	Paul Oakenfold	Worlds Best Selling DJ for "Faster Kill Pussycat" shared with Brittany Murphy	Nominated
2012	Paul Oakenfold	World's Best Electronic Dance Music Artist for "Faster Kill Pussycat" shared with Brittany Murphy	Nominated

Awards and achievements
Preceded by Carl Cox	DJ Magazine Number 1 DJ; 1998–1999	Succeeded by Sasha
