= Perfecto Records =

British trance record label

- Founded: 1989; 37 years ago
- Founder: Paul Oakenfold
- Distributor: Armada Music
- Genre: Trance
- Country of origin: UK
- Official website: https://www.perfectorecords.com/

Perfecto Records is a British trance record label, founded by Paul Oakenfold in 1989. Perfecto was also a remix team consisting of Paul Oakenfold and Steve Osborne and in its later years, Osborne was replaced by Andy Gray. Perfecto Records have provided remixes for U2, Moby, New Order, the Rolling Stones, Simply Red and more.

== History ==
Perfecto was founded by electronic music record producer and DJ Paul Oakenfold in 1989. At the time, house music and the balearic style was beginning to break into the mainstream and Oakenfold was working as an A&R man for Champion Records. The label was distributed through Warner Music through the 1990s, until Paul Oakenfold moved distribution to Mushroom UK in 1998. Following the acquisition by Warner Music of Mushroom UK, the Perfecto catalogue since 1998 transitioned to Warner Music and a couple of years later Perfecto began to operate and release independently until it became a sublabel of Armada Music in 2010.

Perfecto has released singles and albums from such artists as BT, Tilt, Robert Vadney and Carl Cox, as well as mix albums from Sandra Collins, Seb Fontaine, DJ Skribble, and Oakenfold himself. The most well-known of their artist album releases is A Lively Mind, by Oakenfold.

In 2015, Perfecto Records released an album titled Paul Oakenfold Presents 25 Years of Perfecto Records for the anniversary of Perfecto Records running with Paul Oakenfold for 25 years. After Armada, it became a sublabel of Black Hole Recordings. In 2024, it again became a sublabel of Armada.

== Artists ==
Sources:

- Alex M.O.R.P.H.
- Amba Shepherd
- Andy Gray
- Andy Moor
- Arthur Baker
- Astrix
- Ben Gold
- Bo Bruce
- Bryan Kearney
- Cassandra Fox
- CeCe Peniston
- Charlotte Haining
- Cosmic Gate
- D:Fuse
- Darin Epsilon
- DJ Skribble
- Dope Smugglaz
- Emjay
- Ferry Corsten
- Galestian
- Harry Romero
- Hernán Cattáneo
- Infected Mushroom
- Jada
- Jan Johnston
- JES
- John O'Callaghan
- Jordan Suckley
- Juno Reactor
- Konkrete
- Kyau & Albert
- Liquid State
- M.I.K.E. Push
- Man With No Name
- Marco V
- Mark Sherry
- Markus Schulz
- Max Graham
- Mekka
- Mike Koglin
- Mike Saint-Jules
- Monoboy
- Mystica
- Paul Oakenfold
- Phuture
- Planet Perfecto
- PPK
- Protonica
- PureNRG
- Quivver
- RAM
- Richard Beynon
- Richard Durand
- Ross Lara
- Ruby Turner
- Rui da Silva
- Sandra Collins
- Scot Project
- Sean Tyas
- Seb Fontaine
- SEQU3L
- Sied van Riel
- Solarstone
- Steve Osborne
- Sunny Lax
- Tawiah
- Tempo Giusto
- Tilt
- Timo Maas
- Tom Budin
- Vini Vici
