= Writing of Blues and Yellows =

Studio album by Billie Marten
- Released: 23 September 2016
- Genres: English folk; Indie folk
- Length: 53:09
- Labels: Chess Club; RCA Records
- Producers: Rich Cooper; Cam Blackwood

Billie Marten chronology
Writing of Blues and Yellows (2016)	Feeding Seahorses by Hand (2019)

Singles from Writing of Blues and Yellows
- 1. "Out of the Black" Released: 26 May 2015; 2. "Bird" Released: 24 September 2015

Writing of Blues and Yellows is the debut studio album by British singer-songwriter Billie Marten. It was released on 23 September 2016 by Chess Club and RCA records.

== Background ==
Marten recorded "Writing of Blues and Yellows" while she was still a student at school, and opted to stay and finish her education. Marten later said of the album: "It was constant travel, and I didn't know what was happening at all. I didn't know the process of an album really, so that was a new experience. The first album was pure retrospect, which is funny because I'd barely done anything in life."

== Critical reception ==
Professional ratings
Aggregate scores
Source	Rating
AnyDecentMusic?	(7.5/10)
Metacritic	75/100
Review scores
Source	Rating
The 405	(8/10)
Clash Music	(7/10)
DIY	4/5 stars
The Guardian	(6/10)
The Standard	4/5 stars

The album was met with positive critical acclaim upon its release. According to the review aggregator Metacritic, the album received "generally favorable reviews" based on a weighted average score of 75 out of 100 from eight critic scores.

Lois Browne of Clash Music rated the album a 7 out of 10, saying Marten's "vocals are infused with a fragility that drills down into your consciousness, whether you want it to or not."

No Ripcord also rated the album a 7 out of 10, saying "It is essentially indie-folk by numbers, with a nervy wistfulness and soft-hued canvas, but its aching beauty prevents the record from stifling a listener with its persistent translucence."

The Guardian rated the album a 6 out of 10, stating: "Writing of Blues and Yellows, although musically miles above the average tremulous, John Lewis-y singer-songwriter sort, has the limited palette of juvenilia; no humour, little anger, just delicate, pastel wistfulness".

== Track listing ==
Writing of Blues and Yellows track listing
No.	Title	Writer(s)	Length
1.	"La Lune"	Billie Marten, Jason Odle	3:07
2.	"Bird"	Marten, Olivia Broadfield	3:40
3.	"Lionhearted"	Marten, Fiona Bevan	4:30
4.	"Emily"	Marten	4:03
5.	"Milk & Honey"	Marten, Bevan	3:58
6.	"Green"	Marten	2:49
7.	"Heavy Weather"	Marten, Bevan	4:12
8.	"Unaware"	Marten	3:28
9.	"Hello Sunshine"	Marten	4:58
10.	"Live"	Marten, Bevan	4:03
11.	"Teeth"	Marten	5:21
12.	"Untitled"	Marten, Justin Parker	6:11
13.	"It's a Fine Day"	Edward Barton	2:40
Total length:			53:09

No.	Title	Writer(s)	Length
1.	"Green - Demo"	Marten	2:48
2.	"La Lune - BBC Live Version (Lauren Laverne Session)"	Marten, Odle	3:08
3.	"Out of the Black"	Mike Kerr, Ben Thatcher	3:59
4.	"Hand over Head - demo"	Marten, Odle	4:18
5.	"Milk & Honey - Alt Version"	Marten, Bevan	4:48
Total length:			72:10

Notes

- "It's a Fine Day" is a cover of the song by Opus III, written by Edward Barton.
- "Out of the Black" is a cover of the song by Royal Blood, written by members Mike Kerr and Ben Thatcher.

== Personnel ==
Credits adapted from Tidal.

- Billie Marten - vocals (all tracks), guitar (1, 4-10, 12, 14-16), electric guitar (17-18), composition (1-12, 14-15, 17-18), percussion (3-4, 10), piano (3, 6, 8-9, 11-12)
- Rich Cooper - production (1-5, 8-10), drums (1, 3-5, 8, 10), keyboard (1), percussion (1, 3-5, 8-10), bass guitar (9)
- Jason Odle - writing (1, 15, 17), keyboard (15), bass guitar,(17), acoustic guitar (18), percussion (17-18)
- Alex Eichenberger - cello (2,4, 9-10, 15), guitar (3), piano (3, 10), backing vocals (15)
- Fred Cox - guitar (2), piano (2)
- Olivia Broadfield - writing (2)
- Fiona Bevan - writing (3, 5, 7, 10, 18)
- Cam Blackwood - keyboard (7), production (8-9, 12), bass (6, 12), guitar (6-7, 12), percussion (6), piano (12), synthesizer (6-7, 12)
- Justin Parker - writing (12)
- George Ezra - guitar (12)

== Charts ==
Chart performance for Writing of Blues and Yellows
Chart (2016)	Peak position
Scottish Albums (Official Charts)	96
UK Albums (Official Charts)	53
