= Swipe Me =

Studio album by Barcode Brothers
- Released: 11 August 2000
- Genre: Trance
- Length: 43:52
- Label: Universal
- Producer: Christian Møller Nielsen, Anders Øland, Michael Parsberg, Jakob Stavnstrup, Jonas Schrøder, Adam Powers

Barcode Brothers chronology
Swipe Me (2000)	BB02 (2002)

Singles from Swipe Me
- 1. "Dooh Dooh" Released: 1999; 2. "Tele" Released: 2000; 3. "It's a Fine Day" Released: 2000; 4. "Flute" Released: 2000

Professional ratings
Review scores
Source	Rating
Gaffa	1/6 stars

Swipe Me is the debut album by the Danish trance duo Barcode Brothers, released on 11 August 2000. It reached No. 24 on the Danish albums chart.

== Track listing ==
No.	Title	Writer(s)	Producer(s)	Length
1.	"Intro"	Christian Møller Nielsen, Anders Øland	Nielsen, Øland	0:44
2.	"Dooh Dooh"	Nielsen, Øland	Nielsen, Øland	3:51
3.	"Tele"	Nielsen, Øland, Michael Parsberg, Jakob Stavnstrup	Nielsen, Øland	3:27
4.	"It's a Fine Day"	Edward Barton	Nielsen, Øland, Jonas Schrøder, Adam Powers	3:52
5.	"Interlude - Swing"	Nielsen, Øland	Nielsen, Øland	0:57
6.	"Heartbeat"	Nielsen, Øland, Schrøder, Powers	Nielsen, Øland	3:13
7.	"Flute"	Nielsen, Øland, Parsberg, Stavnstrup	Nielsen, Øland	4:44
8.	"Wake Up"	Nielsen, Øland, Parsberg, Stavnstrup, Schrøder, Powers	Nielsen, Øland, Parsberg, Stavnstrup	3:49
9.	"Interlude - Electro"	Nielsen, Øland	Nielsen, Øland	1:27
10.	"Keep Me From the Rain"	Nielsen, Øland, Schrøder, Powers	Nielsen, Øland, Schrøder, Powers	3:34
11.	"Train"	Nielsen, Øland, Parsberg, Stavnstrup	Nielsen, Øland, Parsberg, Stavnstrup	4:11
12.	"Interlude - Beatbox"	Nielsen, Øland	Nielsen, Øland	0:48
13.	"Ambient"	Nielsen, Øland	Nielsen, Øland	4:46
14.	"Goodnight"	Nielsen, Øland	Nielsen, Øland	3:21
15.	"Outro"	Nielsen, Øland	Nielsen, Øland	1:26

== Charts ==
Chart (2001)	Peak position
Danish Albums Chart	24
