= Invisible (Tilt song) =

Single by Tilt
- Released: April 23, 1999
- Genre: Trance; Progressive trance
- Label: Hooj Choons
- Composers: Mick Marks, Mick Wilson, John Graham
- Lyricist: Dominique Atkins

"Invisible" is a song by English electronic music group Tilt, which reached the UK top 20 charts when released in 1999. The song was co-written by Dominique Atkins, from Grace fame, who also provided the vocals.

== Track listings and formats ==
CD 1

1. "Invisible (Original Vocal Edit)" - 4:11
2. "Invisible (Lost Tribe Vocal Mix)" - 7:43
3. "Rendezvous (Tilt's Quadraphonic Instrumental Mix)" - 8:03

CD 2

1. "Invisible (Original Vocal Edit)" - 4:11
2. "Invisible (Original Vocal 12")" - 8:04
3. "I Dream (Tilt's Resurrection Mix)" - 7:25

12" single

1. "Invisible (Lost Tribe Vocal Mix)"
2. "What's This? (Tilt's Tunnel Mix)"
