= If I Could Fly (album) =

Studio album by Grace
- Released: 16 September 1996
- Genre: Trance; dance; pop; house
- Label: Perfecto
- Producer: Paul Oakenfold; Steve Osborne

If I Could Fly is the only album by British dance music act Grace, consisting of DJs Paul Oakenfold and Steve Osborne, and jazz singer Dominique Atkins. It was released in 1996 and features their six hit singles; "Not Over Yet", "I Want to Live", "Skin on Skin", "Down to Earth", "If I Could Fly" and a cover of Opus III's "Hand in Hand". Despite each of the singles reaching the UK top 40 between 1995 and 1997, the album failed to chart.

== Critical reception ==
Professional ratings
Review scores
Source	Rating
AllMusic	2/5 stars
The Baltimore Sun	(favorable)
Muzik	3/5 stars
Sunday Mirror	7/10 stars

J.D. Considine from The Baltimore Sun declared the album as "one of the season's most satisfying dance releases." He added, "As usual with Oakenfold and Osborne, the music is tuneful and insistent, buoyed by relentless beats but blessed with enough melodic content to keep mind and body engaged."

== Track listing ==
No.	Title	Writer(s)	Length
1.	"Not Over Yet"	Paul Oakenfold; Rob Davis; Mike Wyzgowski	5:59
2.	"Down to Earth"	Oakenfold; Davis; Steve Osborne	6:21
3.	"If I Could Fly"	Jimmy Polo	4:45
4.	"One Day"	Oakenfold; Osborne; Dominique Atkins	4:49
5.	"You Don't Know"	Oakenfold; Davis; Osborne	6:18
6.	"Orange"	Oakenfold; Osborne	6:52
7.	"Hand in Hand"	Kevin Dodds; Nigel Walton; Ian Munro; Kirsty Hawkshaw; Martin Brammer	3:45
8.	"Love Songs"	Oakenfold; Osborne; Atkins; Scott	4:22
9.	"Don't Call Me (You're Not Mine)"	Atkins; Rob Lord	5:23
10.	"Mineral"	Oakenfold; Osborne	4:44
11.	"Skin on Skin"	Oakenfold; Osborne; Atkins; Moira Lambert	5:31
12.	"I Want to Live"	Gavin Friday; Maurice Seezer	5:56
