= Flora Fauna =

Studio album by Billie Marten
- Released: 21 May 2021
- Studio: The Premises Studios
- Genre: Folk
- Length: 35:11
- Label: Fiction
- Producer: Rich Cooper

Billie Marten chronology
Feeding Seahorses by Hand (2019)	Flora Fauna (2021)	Drop Cherries (2023)

Singles from Flora Fauna
- 1. "Garden of Eden" Released: 28 January 2021; 2. "Creature of Mine" Released: 6 April 2021; 3. "Human Replacement" Released: 17 May 2021; 4. "Liquid Love (Mr Jukes Remix)" Released: 20 October 2021; 5. "Liquid Love (Acapella)" Released: 3 November 2021

Flora Fauna is the third album by British singer-songwriter Billie Marten, released on 21 May 2021 by Fiction Records.

== Background and recording ==
Flora Fauna was Marten's first release under an independent label, as well as a new management team after being dropped by Sony Music.

She described the album as something of a second flight, saying: "I've moved at an incredible pace without realising. Now I'm like, I know what's up. This is the second coming, indeed." The album was inspired by this idea, with Marten taking more control of her career and life, as well as her feelings of coming full-circle in regards to her work.

Of the album, Marten said: "I wasn't really treating myself very well, it was a bit of a disruptive time. All these songs are about getting myself out of that hole – they're quite strong affirmations. The name Flora Fauna is like a green bath for my eyes. If the album was a painting, it would look like flora and fauna – it encompasses every organism, every corner of Earth, and a feeling of total abundance."

== Critical reception ==
Flora Fauna received a score of 84 out of 100 on review aggregator Metacritic based on 7 critic reviews, which is categorised by the website was "universal acclaim".

Clash Music gave the album 9 out of 10, saying: "Flora Fauna is proof that a woman can be many things. She can eat the earth and become it, or like an archer with a bow and arrow, she can throw heavy clumps of mud at the things that stand in her way."

NME and the Independent both rated the album 4 out of 5 stars, with the Independent saying the album marked a "clear evolution" for the singer.

== Track listing ==
All songs written by Billie Marten, with Rich Cooper co-writing tracks 1–5 and 7.

Flora Fauna track listing
No.	Title	Length
1.	"Garden of Eden"	3:19
2.	"Creature of Mine"	3:23
3.	"Human Replacement"	3:05
4.	"Liquid Love"	3:51
5.	"Heaven"	4:08
6.	"Ruin"	3:38
7.	"Pigeon"	3:36
8.	"Kill The Clown"	3:18
9.	"Walnut"	3:27
10.	"Aquarium"	3:20
Total length:		35:11

== Personnel ==
- Billie Marten – vocals (all tracks), guitar, bass, piano, keyboard, songwriting
- Tim Abbey – bass (1, 8–9)
- Angelica Bjornsson – assistant engineering
- Matilda Bywater – trumpet (2)
- Matt Colton – mastering, lacquer cutting
- Rich Cooper – production, engineering, drums, keyboards, synth, bass, percussion, backing vocals, writing
- Harry Fausing Smith – strings (3, 8–9)
- Guy Garvey – vocals (4)
- Neil Goody – engineering
- Tommy Heap – organ (10)
- Nick Hill – baritone guitar (7)
- William Rees – slide guitar (7)
- Katie Silvester – photography
- Jack Stanley Daley – assistant engineering
- Matt Wiggins – mixing
