= FM Radio Gods =

Canadian musical duo

FM Radio Gods is the live electronica act of two artists: Andrew Hamilton (formerly Lucid) and Tao-Nhan Nguyen (DJ Tao), both from Montreal, Quebec.

In 2008, their track "See You Later Oscillator", the result of a collaboration between FM Radio Gods and Ali Emad (aka eFem), won the Roland Synthesizer Contest.

== Biography ==
Since their debut in 2006, FM Radio Gods has recorded prolifically and appeared live on numerous occasions, including at the 2013 Rainbow Serpent Festival in Australia, and the 2017 Ozora Festival.

== Discography ==
=== EPs & Singles ===
2025 - No Break (Remixes) - FM Radio Gods Remix, Plastic Robots & ALPHANO, Warbeats Records
2025 - Honeydrop & Combastion EP (Incl. Remixes by Temple Tears, Digital Committee), Warbeats Records
2025 - Dynamo 5-track EP, Digital Structures
2024 - Blazing Beats 2-track EP, Techgnosis Records
2024 - Paraphonic, single (with Plastic Robots), Warbeats Records
2021 - Track on At the Crossroads, Vol. 09 compilation, Digital Structures
2019 - Combustable, single, Plusquam MMXIX
2019 - Track on At the Crossroads, Vol. 08 compilation, Digital Structures
2017 - Track on Digital Family, Vol. 1 compilation
2016 - Horizon 2-track EP, Great Stuff Recordings>
2015 - Singleton Fingleton (feat. FM Radio Gods), with Electrocado, Gravitas Recordings
2013 - Supernova 2-track EP, Digital Structures
2011 - Polyphonic Remixes 2-track EP, Attitude Recordings
2011 - I'm Studio, 3-track EP, Plastik Park Records
2010 - Back to Light - The FM Radio Gods Remix Collection, Bomb The Bass
2010 - Radiofone 4-track EP, Plastik Park Records
2010 - 333 2-track EP, Baroque Records
2010 - Polyphonic 2-track EP, Attitude Recordings
2009 - I Am 2-track EP, Baroque Records
2009 - 341, single (in Solstice Summer compilation),Baroque Records
2009 - Tokyo Tea Remixes 3-track EP, Attitude Recordings
2009 - Tokyo Tea 3-track EP, Attitude Recordings
2009 - See You Later Oscillator EP, Blaubeat
2009 - Circuit Child 3-track EP, Tribal Vision Records
2008 - Atom Bells (October Rust Rmx), Digital Family compilation, Digital Diamonds
2008 - Back to L.A. 2-track EP, Attitude Recordings
2008 - Temper (in Reloaded 3 compilation), Plastik Park Records
2008 - Earthworms Are Easy 2-track EP, Attitude Recordings
2008 - I Cry (La Baaz & Kara Mehl Kinky Beats compilation), Echoes Records
2008 - Musak Attack, single, Iboga Records
2008 - Clock Ticker, single, (Traffic compilation by Khainz), Echoes
2008 - MFarm 2-track EP, Plastik Park Records
2008 - Fine Times, single, Plusquam Records
2008 - Electrophyde 4-track EP, Attitude Recordings
2008 - Atom Bells (Stargazer EP), Attitude Recordings
2008 - Bite the Dust 3-track EP, Attitude Recordings
2008 - Sleeper 2-track EP, Tribal Vision Records
2008 - Electro Kills, single (in Electro Inside vol. 2 compilation), Blue Tunes Records
2008 - Stargazer 2-track EP, with Metalogic, Attitude Recordings
2007 - Elastoplast Digital 3-Track EP, Cold Groove Records
2007 - Freeflow EP, Cold Groove Records
2006 - Sine In EP, Epsilon Lab

=== Remixes ===
2009 - Papercut - NDSA (FM Radio Gods remix), Attitude Recordings
2007 - Antix - Seven Seas (FM Radio Gods & Tapwatr remix), Iboga Records
2007 - Kino Oko - Day to Die * (FM Radio Gods remix), Cold Groove Records
2006 - Nuclear Ramjet - Folding Time (FM Radio Gods remix), Spaceport Records
