= Grace (group) =

Dance music band (1993–1999)

- Genres: Trance, pop, dance
- Years active: 1993–1999
- Label: Perfecto
- Past members: Dominique Atkins; Paul Oakenfold; Steve Osborne

Grace was a 1990s British dance music act, consisting of the DJs Paul Oakenfold and Steve Osborne and the jazz singer Dominique Atkins. The group's debut single, "Not Over Yet" (originally released in 1993 and then again in 1995), had lead and backing vocals by the original frontwoman Patti Low. Atkins recorded her own lead vocals for "Not Over Yet" when it was included as the first track on the group's only album If I Could Fly.

== History ==
The group was initially named State of Grace, shortened to Grace following the discovery of another group of the same name. In existence from 1993 to 1997, the group served mainly to showcase Oakenfold and Osborne's production talents. They had seven Top 40 hits, most notably the dance anthem "Not Over Yet", which peaked at #6 in the UK Singles Chart, and topped the Hot Dance Music/Club Play chart in the US. The original front-woman, Patti Low, also recorded one other track while involved with Grace called "Helpless", which was only released as the B-side on the tape cassette release of "Not Over Yet" in 1995. Low appeared in the 1995 promotional video for "Not Over Yet" and also performed live lead-vocals in Grace's appearance on Top of the Pops in early 1995. For reasons unknown, she was then replaced as the lead singer with Dominique Atkins, of whom Oakenfold had become aware through her vocals on the previous Perfecto release "Passion" by Jon of the Pleased Wimmin. Subsequent recordings and personal appearances would feature Atkins as lead singer. The September 1995 track "I Want To Live" (UK #30)/(UK Dance #6) which was a cover of the song by Gavin Friday (also covered by Naomi Campbell) had the "Not Over Yet" lead singer Low on backing vocals. Further singles by Grace were "Skin on Skin" (UK #21), "Down to Earth" (UK #20), "If I Could Fly" (UK #29), "Hand in Hand" (UK #38) and double A-side of "You're Not Mine" (renamed "Don't Call Me (You're Not Mine)") along with a re-release of "Down to Earth" (UK #29). The group released an album entitled If I Could Fly though this did not enter the chart.

"Skin on Skin" was a reworking of Oakenfold's "Perfecto Mix" of U2's "Lemon" that was released in 1993. Indeed, the Orange Mix of "Skin on Skin" is even closer to the original Perfecto Mix of "Lemon". The Orange Mix later appeared as the second track on Oakenfold's acclaimed Goa Mix (1994).

The group was dissolved in 1997, when Oakenfold was touring more frequently as a performance DJ and could not commit to recording. Atkins would go on to record vocals for Tilt on their track "Rendezvous", which was retitled "Invisible", and was originally to be released as "Tilt feat. Grace", but the Grace title was dropped for the release. The track reached number 20 in May 1999.

In 1999, "Not Over Yet" was re-released with new remixes by Matt Darey, Breeder and Da Sickboys though the radio version was an edited version of the original 1995 Perfecto Radio Edit. The release was credited to Planet Perfecto featuring Grace. It again reached the UK Top 20, peaking at number 16.

In 2007, "Not Over Yet" was reworked by the Klaxons and renamed "It's Not Over Yet", for their album Myths of the Near Future. In July 2011, new remixes of "Not Over Yet" were released by Perfecto. In December 2011, a new track for Grace (Dominique Atkins) was announced on Tilt's official Facebook page as being currently written.

In 2026, Not Over Yet re-entered the UK Top 40 through a remix by Paul Oakenfold and Julian Fijma which was used on the Christmas advert by JD Sports".

== Grace singles ==
=== "Not Over Yet" (1995) ===
==== Charts ====
Chart (1995)	Peak position
Australia (ARIA)	144
Europe (Eurochart Hot 100)	12
Europe (European Dance Radio)	10
Iceland (Íslenski Listinn Topp 40)	31
Ireland (IRMA)	4
Israel (Israeli Singles Chart)	3
Netherlands (Dutch Single Tip)	15
Scotland (OCC)	7
Sweden (Sverigetopplistan)	33
UK Singles (OCC)	6
UK Dance (OCC)	1
UK Airplay (Music Week)	16
UK Club Chart (Music Week)	1
UK Pop Tip Club Chart (Music Week)	4
US Hot Dance Club Play (Billboard)	1

=== "I Want to Live" (1995) ===
==== Critical reception ====
James Masterton for Dotmusic wrote, "Now Grace is back with her second hit single, this time a cover version of a Gavin Friday track which was released several times back in 1992 yet never once made the charts, an injustice which is now finally corrected by this new version." A reviewer from Music Week gave the song a score of four out of five adding, "Shades of 'It's All Over' abound in this tuneful number which should echo the success of its predecessor." An editor, Alan Jones, wrote that "a lightly synth-textured, almost ethereal delight, it has only just been released to the clubs, but watch it go." James Hamilton from the Record Mirror Dance Update deemed it a "hypnotic cooing throbber" in his weekly dance column.

==== Charts ====
Chart (1995)	Peak position
Australia (ARIA)	209
Israel (Israeli Singles Chart)	3
Scotland (OCC)	32
UK Singles (OCC)	30
UK Dance (OCC)	6

=== "Skin on Skin" (1996) ===
==== Critical reception ====
Larry Flick from Billboard magazine praised the track. He wrote, "Oh-so-charming Perfecto U.K. ingenue Grace continues her rapid ascension into international pop consciousness with 'Skin On Skin', a trance/NRG anthem inspired by producer (and Perfecto founder) Paul Oakenfold's 1995 underground hit 'Orange'. Her wispy, ethereal voice has a sharper edge here, no doubt urged on by the track's forceful bassline and racing synths. The double pack of remixes succeeds in giving DJs several shades of keyboard drama to work with, though the beat never goes below the wind-knocking pace of the primary A-side vocal version. For those who want to monitor the track's progression from 'Orange' to 'Skin On Skin', the original jam is also included. A winning single that leaves you wanting to hear more and more of this intriguing young performer."

==== Charts ====
Chart (1996)	Peak position
Australia (ARIA)	147
Israel (Israeli Singles Chart)	5
Scotland (OCC)	24
UK Singles (OCC)	21
UK Dance (OCC)	3

=== "Down to Earth" (1996) ===
==== Critical reception ====
J.D. Considine from The Baltimore Sun wrote that "instead of riding the surging hook of 'Down to Earth', her voice floats blithely atop it, swept away by the beats as completely as a dancer would be." A reviewer from Music Week rated the song three out of five, adding, "The hook doesn't really hammer home but superb production ensures this track still has impact. Likely to be a moderate success." James Hamilton from the Record Mirror Dance Update described it as a "Dominique Atkins cooed scurrying sweet soundscaper" in his weekly dance column. Also another RM editor, Tim Jeffery, gave it a score of three out of five, declaring it as "another sweetly-sung melody from Grace over a succession of remixes" and a "commercial trancer". In 1997, Music Week rated the song four out of five. A reviewer wrote, "Singer Dominique Atkins looks set to repeat the success of 'Not Over Yet' with this sweet slice of dancefloor pop with a chirruping vocal hookline."

==== Charts ====
Chart (1996)	Peak position
Israel (Israeli Singles Chart)	8
Scotland (OCC)	16
UK Singles (OCC)	20
UK Dance (OCC)	8

=== "If I Could Fly" (1996) ===
==== Critical reception ====
Larry Flick from Billboard magazine praised the song, writing, "Once again, angelic Perfecto singer Grace hits the mark with yet another brilliantly crafted single, 'If I Could Fly'. Dreamy as can be, the track has been properly tweaked by Smith & Mighty and LTJ Bukem."

==== Charts ====
Chart (1996)	Peak position
Scotland (OCC)	35
UK Singles (OCC)	29
UK Dance (OCC)	5

=== "Hand in Hand" (Opus III cover, 1997) ===
==== Critical reception ====
British The Guardian named "Hand in Hand" "Grace's strongest single to date". J.D. Considine from The Baltimore Sun thought the song had "too much exuberance."

==== Charts ====
Chart (1997)	Peak position
Europe (Eurochart Hot 100)	85
Israel (Israeli Singles Chart)	21
Scotland (OCC)	32
UK Singles (OCC)	38
UK Dance (OCC)	8

=== "Down To Earth (1997)" ===
In July 1997, Perfecto issued new remixes of Down To Earth by Ascension, Dekkard and Groovecult. The Ascension remix would be the lead version serviced to radio. For retail release, the CD1 contained an edit of "Don't Call Me (You're Not Mine)" retitled to You're Not Mine along with a new remix of previous single Skin On Skin. Despite You're Not Mine's position as Track 1 on CD1, the Official Charts lists the charting release as just Down To Earth. You're Not Mine was not included on any promotional releases either.

==== Charts ====
Chart (1997)	Peak position
UK Singles (OCC)	29

=== "Not Over Yet (1999)" ===
In August 1999, Warner Music issued new remixes of Not Over Yet with the track re-credited to Planet Perfecto featuring Grace. Despite the new remixes by Matt Darey, Breeder and Da Sickboyz, the radio version was a shorter version on the original radio edit. Neither Atkins or Low were involved in the release. A new video was filmed featuring Sadie Frost.

==== Charts ====
Chart (1999)	Peak position
UK Singles (OCC)	16

== See also ==
- List of number-one dance hits (United States)
- List of artists who reached number one on the US Dance chart
