= I Talk to the Wind =

1969 song by King Crimson

Song by King Crimson

from the album In the Court of the Crimson King
- Released: 12 October 1969
- Recorded: 29 July 1969
- Genre: Folk; progressive rock
- Length: 6:05
- Label: Atlantic
- Composer: Ian McDonald
- Lyricist: Peter Sinfield
- Producer: King Crimson

"I Talk to the Wind" is the second track from the British progressive rock band King Crimson's debut album, In the Court of the Crimson King (1969).

Starting immediately after the cacophony that ends "21st Century Schizoid Man", the mood of this song is a stark contrast; it is serene, simple and peaceful. Ian McDonald's flute begins the song, and is one of the lead instruments throughout. He also plays a classical-inspired solo in the middle of the song as a "C" section and a longer one at the end as a coda.

An earlier demo version of this song may be found on the now out-of-print LP A Young Person's Guide to King Crimson, which featured Robert Fripp (guitar), Peter Giles (bass), Michael Giles (drums), and Ian McDonald (flute), along with Judy Dyble (formerly of Fairport Convention) on vocals. This version was more up-tempo and lighter in instrumentation. The Young Person's Guide recording and another demo of the same song were recorded in 1968 by Giles, Giles and Fripp. The song did not appear on a Giles, Giles and Fripp record until The Brondesbury Tapes (1968) was released on CD in 2002. Two recordings of "I Talk to the Wind" appear on this CD; one features vocals by Judy Dyble, and the other features vocals by Peter Giles.

== Personnel ==
- Robert Fripp – electric guitar
- Ian McDonald – flute, clarinet, reed organ, piano, vocals
- Greg Lake – bass guitar, lead vocals
- Michael Giles – drums
- Peter Sinfield – lyrics

== Opus III version ==
"I Talk to the Wind"

Single by Opus III

from the album Mind Fruit
- B-side: "Sea People"
- Released: 15 June 1992
- Studio: Fluffy Trees; PWL; The Bunker
- Genre: Dance; house; synth-pop; trance
- Length: 4:06
- Label: PWL International
- Songwriters: Ian McDonald; Peter Sinfield
- Producer: Opus III

Opus III singles chronology
"It's a Fine Day" (1992)	"I Talk to the Wind" (1992)	"When You Made the Mountain" (1994)

Music video
- "I Talk to the Wind" on YouTube

In 1992, the song was covered by English electronic music group Opus III, whose lead vocalist was Kirsty Hawkshaw. It was released in June 1992 by PWL International as the follow-up to their successful "It's a Fine Day" and the second single from their debut album, Mind Fruit (1992). The single peaked at number six in Finland, number 52 in the United Kingdom and number 162 in Australia. The accompanying music video for "I Talk to the Wind" is similar to the video for "It's a Fine Day", featuring Hawkshaw with her head shaved and dressed in a silvery bodysuit with silver boots and silver make-up.

=== Critical reception ===
AllMusic editor MacKenzie Wilson felt the group's "crafty version" of King Crimson's "I Talk to the Wind" "composes a dreamy synthetic wave." He also noted Kirsty Hawkshaw's "dove-like vocals transcended into freewheeling soundscapes". Randy Clark from Cashbox wrote that her "childlike and breathy voice blows through this dance track like a gentle breeze." Dave Simpson from Melody Maker viewed it as "another sublime reinvention". Andy Beevers from Music Week opined that the song is similar in style to "It's a Fine Day", "but is nowhere as special." Roger Morton from NME praised it as "excellent". Siân Pattenden from Smash Hits gave it two out of five, remarking that "the flutes whisper along merrily with the bubbly syntheramic background".

=== Track listings ===
- Europe 7-inch single (1992)
1. "I Talk to the Wind" (edit) – 4:06
2. "Sea People" – 6:00
- UK 12-inch single (1992)
1. "I Talk to the Wind" (extended mix) – 6:11
2. "Sea People" – 5:33
- UK CD single (1992)
1. "I Talk to the Wind" (edit) – 4:06
2. "I Talk to the Wind" (12-inch extended mix) – 6:11
3. "Sea People" – 6:00

=== Charts ===
Chart (1992)	Peak position
Australia (ARIA)	162
Europe (Eurochart Hot 100)	88
Finland (IFPI)	6
UK Singles (OCC)	52
UK Dance (Music Week)	48
UK Club Chart (Music Week)	46
