= Lost Witness =

English trance producer

Lost Witness is the English trance producer and DJ Simon Paul (also known as Si Paul), working in collaboration with songwriter Edward Barton, writer of the 1983 Jane & Barton single, "It's a Fine Day" (later covered by Opus III in 1992), and vocalist Danielle Alexander.

He also recorded under the aliases Dusk Til Dawn and The Eden Project.

A number of their singles co-written and produced by Simon Kemper were released on major electronic dance label Ministry of Sound. Some included remixes by English producer and DJ Lange. The 2002 single "Did I Dream (Song to the Siren)" is a cover of the frequently-covered "Song of the Siren" from the 1970 Tim Buckley album Starsailor.

In 2010, Lost Witness re-released the 1999 single "Red Sun Rising" (with vocals from Andrea Britton). It was given airplay by BBC Radio 1 DJ, Judge Jules. A new single, "Fade Away", was released in 2011. In June 2013, they collaborated with Sugababe and former Eurovision entrant Jade Ewen to release the track "Fly".

== Discography ==
=== Singles ===
Year	Song	UK	AUS	Label
1999	"Happiness Happening"	18	—	Ministry of Sound
1999	"Red Sun Rising" (with Tracy Carmen)	22	48	Ministry of Sound
2000	"7 Colours"	28	—	Data Records
2002	"Did I Dream (Song to the Siren)"	28	—	Data Records
2004	"Wait for You" (with Andrea Britton)	78	—	Nebula
2005	"Home" (with Tiff Lacey)	85	—	Nebula
2005	"Open Your Eyes" (with Eden Project)	—	—	Monster Tunes
2005	"Love Again" (with Tiff Lacey)	—	—	W.O.T! Records
2006	"The Waiting Game (Love Is Trance) (Promo)"	—	—	Electronic Trance Communication
2006	"Best"	—	—	Armada Captivating
2007	"Whatever" (vs. Sassot)	—	—	A State of Trance
2007	"Rise Again" (vs. Breeze)	—	—	Futureworld Records
2007	"Coming Down" (with Tiff Lacey)	—	—	Captivate (Fektive)
2007	"Whitelaw presents Going Bush"	—	—	
2008	"Sin Mas" (vs. Sassot)	—	—	FENology Records
2009	"Closer to Love"	—	—	
2011	"Fade Away"	—	—	Maelstrom Records
2011	"Chasing Rainbows" (vs. Antillas & Dankann)	—	—	S107 Recordings
2014	"Feels Like Home" (With Darren Barley)	—	—	disco:wax
2014	"Fall (Part 1)" (With Danielle Simeone)	—	—	Club Family Records
2014	"Fall Pt. 2" (With Danielle Simeone)	—	—	Club Family Records
2014	"Love Again (Pt.1)" (With Tiff Lacey)	—	—	Club Family Records
2014	"Sienna" (vs. Inversoon & Alex Daf)	—	—	Blue Soho Recordings
2014	"Love Again (Pt. 2)" (With Tiff Lacey)	—	—	Club Family Records
2014	"Eternal" (With Three Faces)	—	—	Critical Fusion
2017	"Here With You" (With Darren Barley)	—	—	Soundz Good
2017	"Without You"	—	—	Soundz Good
2019	"Sewn"	—	—	RazNitzanMusic
2019	"Did I Dream (Song To The Siren)" (With Thea Riley & DJ Xquizit)	—	—	Arkham Digital
2019	"Golden" (With Pierre Pienaar & Tracey Carmen)	—	—	RazNitzanMusic
2019	"Crashing Into Love"	—	—	Amsterdam Trance
2020	"This Dream" (With Kate Louise Smith)	—	—	Amsterdam Trance
2020	"Carry Me Home" (With Laura-Ly)	—	—	Amsterdam Trance
2020	"Red Sun Rising 2020" (With Tracey Carmen)	—	—	Amsterdam Trance
2021	"Rescue Me" (With Milos Novotny)	—	—	Edge One
2021	"Now" (With Emel)	—	—	2Rock Recordings
2021	"Falling" (With Osa Blu)	—	—	Lifting Force Music
2021	"Weight of the World" (With Laura-Ly)	—	—	Abora Recordings
2021	"Wait For You" (With Andrea Britton) - John O'Callaghan Remix	—	—	A State of Trance
2022	"Civil War" (With Michael G Moore)	—	—	2Rock Recordings
2022	"Lateott"	—	—	Pure Trance NEON
2022	"Happiness Happening" - Rub!k Remix	—	—	Armada Captivating
2022	"Close to Home" (With Roberta Harrison)	—	—	Pure Trance NEON
2022	"Over You (The 90s Anthem)" (With SJ Johnson)	—	—	Lifting Force Music
2022	"Open Your Eyes" - Kamelon Remix	—	—	Monster Tunes
2022	"It's OK" (With Phoebe)	—	—	Abora Recordings

=== Remixes ===
- 2000 ATB – "Killer"
- 2000 Coldplay – "Trouble" (unofficial)
- 2001 Delerium – "Innocente (Falling in Love)"
- 2002 Ayumi Hamasaki – "Daybreak"
- 2006 Trinity – "Like the Sun" (vs. Sassot)
