= Hand in Hand (Looking for Sweet Inspiration) =

1994 single by Opus III

Single by Opus III

from the album Guru Mother
- Released: 1994
- Recorded: 1993
- Length: 5:01
- Label: PWL; EastWest
- Songwriters: Kevin Dodds; Nigel Walton; Ian Munro; Kirsty Hawkshaw; Martin Brammer
- Producers: Dodds; Walton; Munro; Hawkshaw; Brammer

Opus III singles chronology
"When You Made the Mountain" (1994)	"Hand in Hand (Looking for Sweet Inspiration)" (1994)

"Hand in Hand (Looking for Sweet Inspiration)" is a song by English electronic music group Opus III, released in 1994 by PWL and EastWest Records as the second single from their second album, Guru Mother (1994). It was both written and produced by the group with Martin Brammer, and peaked at No. 79 on the UK Singles Chart and No. 14 on the US Billboard Dance Club Songs chart.

== Critical reception ==
Larry Flick from Billboard magazine commented, "Trance/rave masters dip into their glorious Guru Mother album, pulling out this sparkling jewel. Kirsty Hawkshaw's angelic presence provides poetic depth, while remixes by Paul Oakenfold and Steve Osbourne embellish the song's strong melody with a trend-conscious rhythm base." Pan-European magazine Music & Media wrote, "Imagine all those clubbers trying to follow Opus III's instructions to dance hand in hand. Luckily the beat and the lyrics are dead simple, maybe your station can lend a hand too." Tim Jeffery from Music Week's RM Dance Update noted, "Paul Oakenfold provides the mixes and they're very pleasant, quite mellow trancey excursions that are listenable but very unremarkable due to a lacklustre song which drifts along but goes nowhere. As a result the vocal-less trance mix is the best." A reviewer from Select said, "With some careful remixing, however, 'Hand in Hand (Looking for Sweet Inspiration)' could turn into a pretty mean floor-filler."

== Music video ==
The accompanying music video for "Hand in Hand (Looking for Sweet Inspiration)" was directed by Peter Sherrard and produced by Annabel O'Grady for Medialab. It was released on 29 August 1994 and is a sepia drenched fantasy in the rolling fields of Derbyshire.

== Charts ==
Chart (1994)	Peak position
Australia (ARIA)	239
Scotland (OCC)	84
UK Singles (OCC)	79
UK Club Chart (Music Week)	17
US Hot Dance Club Play (Billboard)	14

== Grace version ==
"Hand in Hand"

Single by Grace

from the album If I Could Fly
- Released: 1 April 1997
- Genre: Trance; house; techno
- Label: Perfecto; East West PERF129
- Songwriters: Kevin Dodds; Nigel Walton; Ian Munro; Kirsty Hawkshaw; Martin Brammer
- Producers: Paul Oakenfold; Steve Osborne

Grace singles chronology
"If I Could Fly" (1996)	"Hand in Hand" (1997)	"You're Not Mine/Down to Earth" (1997)

In 1997, British dance act Grace covered the song and released it as their sixth single from their only album, If I Could Fly (1996), titled as "Hand in Hand", on Paul Oakenfold's Perfecto label. It reached number 38 on the UK Singles Chart, number 32 in Scotland and number 85 on the Eurochart Hot 100. Remixes of the song included a complete reworking of the song by Jam El Mar of European dance act Jam & Spoon. Two videos for the song were released, of the Oakenfold and Osborne Radio Mix and an unreleased Eddy Fingers Edit. The Guardian called it "Grace's strongest single to date", while The Baltimore Sun thought the song had "too much exuberance."

=== Track listings and formats ===
#	Title	Length
UK CD single PERF 129CD
1.	"Hand in Hand" [Oakenfold and Osborne Radio Mix]	3:45
2.	"Hand in Hand" [Jam El Mar Mix]	8:28
3.	"Hand in Hand" [Eddy Fingers Vocal Mix]	8:44
4.	"Hand in Hand" [Legend B Mix]	6:20
5.	"Hand in Hand" [Oakenfold and Osborne Mix]	7:25
UK 12" PERF 129T
A1.	"Hand in Hand" [Jam El Mar Mix]	8:28
B1.	"Hand in Hand" [Eddy Fingers Vocal Mix]	8:44
B2.	"Hand in Hand" [Oakenfold and Osborne Mix]	7:25

=== Charts ===
Chart (1997)	Peak position
Europe (Eurochart Hot 100)	85
Israel (Israeli Singles Chart)	21
Scotland (OCC)	32
UK Singles (OCC)	38
UK Dance (OCC)	8
