= Mind Fruit =

Studio album by Opus III
- Released: 28 July 1992
- Recorded: 1991–1992
- Genre: Ambient, techno
- Length: 38:14
- Label: EastWest (U.S. only); PWL (International)
- Producer: Opus III

Opus III chronology
Mind Fruit (1992)	Guru Mother (1994)

Mind Fruit is the debut album by British electronic music group Opus III. Their hit single "It's a Fine Day" is a cover of a 1983 single by Jane & Barton, while "I Talk to the Wind" is a cover of a King Crimson song from their 1969 debut album In the Court of the Crimson King. "Stars in My Pocket" is a reference to a novel by Samuel R. Delany, while "Into This Universe" features a recital of an English translation of a poem by medieval Persian poet Omar Khayyam.

== Critical reception ==
Professional ratings
Review scores
Source	Rating
AllMusic	3/5 stars
The Encyclopedia of Popular Music	3/5 stars
Entertainment Weekly	A−
Melody Maker	(mixed)
NME	7/10

J.D. Considine from The Baltimore Sun remarked that while the original rendition of "It's a Fine Day" (by "Jane") "was rambling and dreamlike, a voice-only recording that sounded like snatches of someone's private song", the Opus III version "adds both melodic focus and a booming house beat, a combination that turns the tune into an unexpectedly addictive dance single." He added, "A similar bit of magic is worked on Mind Fruit, Opus III's debut, with the King Crimson chestnut "I Talk to the Wind", but little else on the album is as catchy, suggesting that Opus III is only as good as its raw material." Marisa Fox from Entertainment Weekly found that "this self-described ambient-techno group lives up to the genre’s esoteric side." Richard Paton from Toledo Blade felt that this "is a short but essential trip to the English techno scene."

AllMusic editor MacKenzie Wilson wrote, "Their debut, Mind Fruit, (1992) was more than just another techno record in the face of the genre's underground taking shape during the early '90s. Hawkshaw's dove-like vocals transcended into freewheeling soundscapes; the remake of Barton & Jane's "It's a Fine Day" is melodically enchanting with loopy trance vibes and textured synth waves, but the crafty version of King Crimson's "I Talk to the Wind" composes a dreamy synthetic wave. Opus III was barely a step ahead of electronica's late '90s surge, yet it was just strong enough to join the ranks or move beyond the scene. This album, however, does define a healthy dose of what was yet to come. Hawkshaw would later contribute vocals on cuts for BT, Deep Dish, and Orbital."

== Track listing ==
All songs written by Kevin Dobbs, Nigel Walton, Ian Munro, and Kirsty Hawkshaw, except where noted.

1. "It's a Fine Day" (Edward Barton) – 5:29
2. "I Talk to the Wind" (Ian McDonald, Peter Sinfield) – 5:34
3. "Flow" – 2:05
4. "Stars in My Pocket" – 3:01
5. "Sea People" – 5:39
6. "Evolution Rush" – 6:10
7. "Into This Universe" – 3:37
8. "Up" – 3:15
9. "Alzir" – 2:54
10. "Outro" – 0:30

== Charts ==
Chart performance for Mind Fruit
Chart (1992)	Peak position
Australian Albums (ARIA)	173
