= If I Could Fly =

If I Could Fly may refer to:

- If I Could Fly (album), an album by British dance music act Grace
- "If I Could Fly" (Helloween song)
- If I Could Fly (One Direction song)
- "If I Could Fly", a song by Bradley Joseph from his album One Deep Breath
- "If I Could Fly", a song by Grace from their album If I Could Fly
- "If I Could Fly", an instrumental by Joe Satriani from his album Is There Love in Space?
- "If I Could Fly", a song by OceanLab from the album Sirens of the Sea
