= When You Made the Mountain =

"When You Made The Mountain"

Single by Opus III

from the album Guru Mother
- Released: 1994
- Recorded: 1993
- Genre: Dance-pop; techno; trance
- Length: 3:31
- Label: PWL International; EastWest; Elektra
- Songwriters: Dodds; Walton; Muro; Hawkshaw; Brammer
- Producers: Dodds; Walton; Muro; Hawkshaw; Brammer

Opus III singles chronology
"I Talk to the Wind" (1992)	"When You Made The Mountain" (1994)	"Hand in Hand (Looking for Sweet Inspiration)" (1994)

Music video
- "When You Made the Mountain" on YouTube

"When You Made the Mountain" is an "environmentally themed" electronica/dance song recorded by English electronic music group Opus III with vocals by Kirsty Hawkshaw. It was released in 1994 as the lead single from their second album, Guru Mother (1994), and received positive reviews from music critics. The track got as far as number 75 on the UK Singles Chart, but it would go all the way to number-one on the US Billboard Hot Dance Club Play chart, giving the act their second and final chart-topper in the United States.

== Critical reception ==
William Cooper from AllMusic named "When You Made the Mountain" a "strong" track. Larry Flick from Billboard magazine described it as a "jaunty, futuristic anthem that has a more fully realized song structure and an assured vocal." He added, "A dancefloor smash that should get close listen from radio pundits." Linda Ryan from the Gavin Report commented, "As with their 1992 hit, 'It's a Fine Day', Opus III manage to convincingly toe the line between unabashed pop and club-inspired dance music. Not an easy task to pull off these days, but [...] 'When You Made the Mountain' comes through with flying colors." Another GR editor, Dave Sholin, added, "Listening to lead singer Kirsty Hawkshaw and the beat that drives this song, it's possible one might get hypnotized." Jennifer Nine from Melody Maker wrote, "Not unmemorable shimmery chart dance pop, with a good beat, witchy girl vocal, and zoomy synths and stuff." Music Week's RM Dance Update declared it as "summery pop-house". John Kilgo from The Network Forty described it as a "uptempo techno beat with spice."

== Track listings ==
- 12" single promo (US/UK)

A1: "When You Made the Mountain" (Afro Cuban Trance Mix)
A2: "When You Made the Mountain" (Acid Fro Mix)
B1: "When You Made the Mountain" (MK Mix)
B2: "When You Made the Mountain" (MK Dub)

- 2X12" promo (US)

A1: "When You Made the Mountain" (Extended Mix) (5:29)
A2: "When You Made the Mountain" (Radio Edit) (3:26)
B1: "When You Made the Mountain" (MK Remix) (7:30)
B2: "When You Made the Mountain" (MK Dub) (6:58)
C1: "When You Made the Mountain" (Afro Cuban Trance Mix) (8:29)
C2: "When You Made the Mountain" (Afro Cuban Trance Mix Instrumental) (6:15)
C3: "When You Made the Mountain" (Acid Fro Dub) (5:16)
D1: "When You Made the Mountain" (Paul Gotel Club Mix) (8:32)
D2: "When You Made the Mountain" (Well Hung Parliament Adventure) (9:10)
D3: "When You Made the Mountain" (Well Hung Dub) (7:20)

- CD single (US/UK)
1. "When You Made the Mountain" (Opus III Original Edit) (3:31)
2. "When You Made the Mountain" (Opus III Original Mix) (5:34)
3. "When You Made the Mountain" (Paul Gotel Club Mix) (8:34)
4. "When You Made the Mountain" (Well Hung Parliament Adventure) (9:13)
5. "When You Made the Mountain" (MK Mix) (7:33)
6. "When You Made the Mountain" (Afro Cuban Trance Edit) (4:16)

== Charts ==
Chart (1994)	Peak position
Australia (ARIA)	172
UK Singles (OCC)	75
UK Dance (Music Week)	26
UK Club Chart (Music Week)	18
US Hot Dance Club Play (Billboard)	1
