= Dog Eared =

Studio album by Billie Marten
- Released: 18 July 2025
- Studio: Sugar Mountain (Bed-Stuy, Brooklyn)
- Genres: English folk; indie folk
- Length: 37:24
- Label: Fiction
- Producer: Philip Weinrobe

Billie Marten chronology
Drop Cherries (2023)	Dog Eared (2025)

Singles from Dog Eared
- 1. "Crown" Released: 11 October 2024; 2. "Feeling" Released: 19 March 2025; 3. "Leap Year" Released: 16 April 2025; 4. "Swing" Released: 14 May 2025; 5. "Clover" Released: 18 June 2025

Dog Eared is the fifth studio album by British singer-songwriter Billie Marten, released on 18 July 2025 by Fiction Records. Five singles predated its release, starting with "Crown" in October 2024.

== Background and recording ==
Marten wanted her fifth album to feel more like a collaborative effort with her fellow recording musicians, with producer Philip Weinrobe calling for "live takes, intuition, and no headphones."

The album was inspired by Marten's nostalgia for various childhood memories. The song "Leap Year" was inspired by a fleeting love, while the song "Feeling" touches on memories of Marten falling deep into her father's large hands, hiding at the top of stairs, and driving toy cars in patterns around her grandmother's rugs." For the album's fifth single "Swing", Marten aimed to create a sound where Meat Puppets meets The Breeders.

The album's title was inspired by Marten's love for "underlining, scribbling in the margins, and folding down the corners of pages in her favorite novels."

== Packaging ==
The album's cover was painted by Brazilian-born painter Daniel Borgonovi, who painted the image only after having heard the album. The painting depicts a portrait of Marten without eyes, which reinforces "the idea of her feeling her way, sharpening her ears and relaxing into the sonic cues".

== Critical reception ==
Professional ratings
Aggregate scores
Source	Rating
Metacritic	88/100
Review scores
Source	Rating
Clash	(8/10)
DIY	4/5 stars
The Independent	5/5 stars

The album was met with positive critical acclaim upon its release. According to the review aggregator Metacritic, the album received "universal acclaim" based on a weighted average score of 88 out of 100 from six critic scores.

The Independent's Helen Brown gave the album a five-star rating, stating: "Given time and attention, the confident craft of the songwriting and mellow musicianship will sink their grooves into the soul."

Henry Dunn of Indie Is Not a Genre gave the album a 4 out of 5 star rating, saying, "With Dog Eared, Billie Marten folds the corner of a defining chapter in her career. Her voice remains the emotional anchor, but it now moves within a broader, more textured sonic space—one that embraces collaboration, complexity, and risk."

== Track listing ==
All tracks are written by Billie Marten.

Dog Eared track listing
No.	Title	Length
1.	"Feeling"	3:20
2.	"Crown"	2:20
3.	"Clover"	3:30
4.	"No Sudden Changes"	3:44
5.	"The Glass"	3:45
6.	"Leap Year"	5:45
7.	"Goodnight Moon"	4:27
8.	"Planets"	3:39
9.	"You and I Both"	4:05
10.	"Swing"	2:45
Total length:		37:24

== Personnel ==
Credits adapted from Tidal.

- Billie Marten – vocals (all tracks), guitar (tracks 1, 3–5, 7, 8)
- Philip Weinrobe – production, mixing, engineering
- Josh Bonati – mastering
- Michael Haldeman – guitar (all tracks), drum machine (2)
- Michael Coleman – synthesizer (all tracks), electric piano (3, 5, 6, 9), vocals (3, 10), electric guitar (4)
- Joshua Crumbly – bass
- Vishal Nayak – drums
- Núria Graham – vocals (1–5, 7–10); bongos, guitar (1); piano (2, 3, 7–9)
- Mauro Refosco – percussion (1, 3–10)
- Adam Brisbin – pedal steel guitar (1), guitar (2, 3), bass (7, 9)
- Shahzad Ismaily – guitar (4, 5)
- Sam Owens – guitar (6, 8), vocals (8, 10)
- Maia Friedman – vocals (6)
- Sam Amidon – fiddle (10)

== Charts ==
Chart performance for Dog Eared
Chart (2025)	Peak position
Scottish Albums (Official Charts)	16
UK Albums (Official Charts)	46
UK Americana Albums (Official Charts)	2
UK Folk Albums (Official Charts)	1
UK Independent Albums (Official Charts)	4
