= Benz & MD =

Canadian electronic music DJ duo

- Origin: London, Ontario, Canada
- Genres: Electronic dance music, House music, Progressive Trance Music
- Years active: 2003-2010
- Labels: Aurium Recordings, Release Records
- Members: Greg Benz; Marco Di Carlo

Benz & MD was a duo of Canadian electronic music DJs and producers Greg Benz and Marco Di Carlo, both graduates of the well-known BealArts program at London, Ontario's H. B. Beal Secondary School. They began recording together in 2003, releasing singles mainly on Aurium Recordings and Release Records, plus Silver Planet, and Baroque Records ("Underoath"). Their 2004 track "Release Time" was recorded by Flash Brothers. "Sound 64" was recorded in collaboration with Ebrius and released by Aurium Recordings. The pair released a 12" vinyl with two versions of "Snowblind".

Their track "Turning The Curves" was included in the 2006 Markus Schulz album Ibiza '06. "Percasins' was included in the Groove spot Mix in 2006. A remix of the song "Vacant" was included in the 2008 album Hydra by the band Iris.

== Discography ==
EPs & Singles

- "Snowblind" (2003), Dorigen Music
- "Oneric" (2003), Aurium Recordings
- "Wonder" (2004), Hope Recordings
- "Dilation" (2004), Release Records
- "Radience" (2004), Release Records
- "Spiagia" / "Tainted" (2004), Baroque Records
- "Sound84" (2004), vs Ebrius, Aurium Recordings
- "Still Rain" / "Dead Calm" (2004), Silver Planet Recordings
- "Shudder" (2004), Basic Energy
- "Unconditional" / "Mar Del Plata" (2005), Aurium Recordings
- "Highroller" / "Redline" (2006), Electronic Elements
- "Percasins" / "Open Bar" (2006), Aurium Recordings
- "Turning The Curves" (2006), Electronic Elements
- "Underoath" (2006), Baroque Records
- "Visceral" (2006), Primal Recordings
- "The Sundowner" (2007), Aurium Recordings
- "Places" (2007), Aurium Recordings
- "Subdivision" / "Places In Between" (2007), Aurium Recordings
- "Sustain Release" / "Departed" (2007), Aurium Recordings
- Signals / Orion's Belt (2007), split EP with Stefan Anion, Proton Music
- A Priori / Signals (2008), split EP with The Last Atlant, Proton Music
- Robot / Ending (2008), split EP with Micah, Proton Particles
- Alternate Ending / You Made Me Smile (2008), split EP with Michael Feihstel, Proton Particles
- Restraint EP (2009), Aurium Recordings
- The Patrol EP (2010), Aurium Recordings

Compilation inclusions

- 7 Year Itch! (History Of Hope Compilation), "Wonder" (2005), Hope Recordings
- 50 Trance Tunes Deluxe Volume 1, "Turning The Curves" (2008), Armada Digital
- 50 Trance Tunes Deluxe Volume 2, "Highroller" (2009), Armada Digital
