= Barcode Brothers =

Danish musical duo

- Origin: Copenhagen, Denmark
- Genres: Trance
- Years active: 1999–2004; 2023–present
- Label: Universal
- Members: Christian Møller Nielsen; Anders Øland

Barcode Brothers is a Danish trance duo consisting of Christian Møller Nielsen and Anders Øland. Best known for the moderate European hit "Dooh Dooh" in 1999, they released two studio albums before disbanding in 2004. They reformed in 2023.

== Discography ==
=== Studio albums ===
List of studio albums, with selected chart positions and details
Title	Album details	Peak chart positions
Title	Album details	DEN
Swipe Me	Released: 2000; Label: Universal Music (Denmark); Format: CD, cassette, digital download	24
BB02	Released: 2002; Label: Universal Music (Denmark); Format: CD, cassette, digital download	19

=== Singles ===
List of singles as lead artist, with selected chart positions and album name
Title	Year	Peak chart positions					Album
Title	Year	AUT	FRA	GER	POL	SWI	Album
"These Boots Are Made for Walking"	1999	—	76	—	—	—	Non-album single
"Dooh Dooh"	1999	36	—	17	14	89	Swipe Me
"Tele"	2000	—	—	—	—	—	Swipe Me
"It's a Fine Day"	2000	—	—	—	—	—	Swipe Me
"Flute"	2000	—	—	41	—	46	Swipe Me
"SMS"	2002	—	—	52	—	—	BB02
"—" denotes a recording that did not chart or was not released in that territory.

=== Promotional singles ===
List of promotional singles and album name
Title	Year	Album
"Barcodemegamix02"	2000	Non-album single remix of "SMS"; promotional tie-in for Bionicle
"Akustik"	2002	BB02

=== Remixes ===
- Balearic Bill - "Destination Sunshine" (Barcode Brothers Remix) (1999)
- Star - "Heaven's on Fire" (Barcode Brothers Fire Mix) (1999)
- Star - "This Is My Life" (Barcode's Club) (1999)
- S.O.A.P. – "S.O.A.P. Is in the Air" (Barcode Brothers Club remix) (2000)
