= Feeding Seahorses by Hand =

Studio album by Billie Marten
- Released: 26 April 2019
- Studio: Rockfield Studios; Three Crows Studio; Studio 21
- Genre: English folk; indie folk
- Length: 47:15
- Label: Chess Club; RCA Records
- Producer: Ethan Johns; Rich Cooper

Billie Marten chronology
Writing of Blues and Yellows (2016)	Feeding Seahorses by Hand (2019)	Flora Fauna (2021)

Singles from Feeding Seahorses by Hand
- 1. "Mice" Released: 9 September 2018; 2. "Blue Sea, Red Sea" Released: 7 November 2018; 3. "Betsy" Released: 15 March 2019; 4. "Cartoon People" Released: 4 April 2019

Feeding Seahorses by Hand is the second studio album by British singer-songwriter Billie Marten, released on 26 April 2019 by Chess Club and RCA Records.

== Background and recording ==
Marten started recording the album in April 2018, with many of the songs coming from demos she had for "maybe a year". On her progression from her debut album, Writing of Blues and Yellows, Marten said: "the first time around, I’d never seen these things before, I didn’t know what these buttons meant – everyone was using a language I’d never heard. It wasn’t my world at all. This time around, it felt a lot more natural."

On her idea for the album, Marten stated: "I wanted it to be a bit less serious, a little bit less tainted with this whole idea of being an acoustic, folky singer-songwriter who is only ever seen in a dark, rainy setting, you know what I mean, I didn’t feel like that. It feels a lot more sunny." Marten took inspiration for the album from Car Seat Headrest. Talk Talk, Simon and Garfunkel, and Elliott Smith.

== Writing ==
Marten wrote the song "Cartoon People" about Donald Trump, who was the President of the United States at the time of the song being written. The song explores the "intimate relationship between Trump and his daughter" from the perspective of his daughter. Similarly, "Betsy" is about confronting a politician. The album's first single, "Mice", was a reflection of Marten's feelings of being an anomaly in the middle of black and white. The album's next single, "Blue Sea, Red Sea", was inspired by Marten's struggles with seasonal affective disorder and the Jewish pilgrimage to the Dead Sea.

On the track "Blood Is Blue", Marten stated: "Day to day, I go around morphing into others. I lose my accent and take theirs, I copy their body language, and lose a sense of self. It’s an insanity song; the slaughter and the meat, dinner table imagery, surrealism in an antiquated dystopian way" and compared it to The Handmaid's Tale and Animal Farm. "Vanilla Baby" was written of Marten's frustrations with how people interact nowadays, while "She Dances" was written about "This human ideal of an untroubled conscience, without ego."

"Toulouse" was written after Marten moved to London from Yorkshire, and is written from a spectator's view of watching people from behind a bar. She likened the feeling to the paintings of Henri de Toulouse-Lautrec, whom the song is named after. "Boxes" is also written about London, specifically the houses. Marten described them as: "endless and all piled on top of each other or behind, edged in every space and slowly swallowing the green and the space."

"Bad Apple" was written about how Marten believes song-writing feels insignificant compared to activism. The penultimate track, "Anda", was written after a trip to the Philippines. The track is about Marten and a friend taking a stranger's boat to see a volcano. The final track, "Fish", was written in Paris, France. On the track, Marten said: "Fish have the smallest brains and they never question it. Salmon will jump endlessly without analysis, something humans do far too often. Sometimes it is good to soften and just be at ease swimming around life "like a fish’". It sums up the record for me."

== Critical reception ==
The album was met with positive critical acclaim upon its release.

The Line of Best Fit gave the album a rating of 80 out of 100, saying: "There are few things more refreshing than to hear a young artist take their time on their second album, and come back with a new project that feels developed, not rushed."

Dork gave the album 60 out of 100, saying: "the record demonstrates assured musicianship, the soft vocals borne along by gentle drums and slick bass guitar. Reaching out wider than before for music and lyrics, Billie Marten is standing on solid ground."

== Track listing ==
All songs written by Billie Marten, except where noted.

Feeding Seahorses by Hand track listing
No.	Title	Length
1.	"Cartoon People" (written by Marten and John Congleton)	3:33
2.	"Mice"	4:04
3.	"Betsy" (written by Marten and Rich Cooper)	3:32
4.	"Blood Is Blue"	3:13
5.	"Blue Sea, Red Sea"	3:53
6.	"Vanilla Baby"	4:15
7.	"Toulouse"	4:06
8.	"She Dances"	4:43
9.	"Bad Apple"	4:30
10.	"Boxes" (written by Marten and Jolyon Thomas)	5:11
11.	"Anda"	3:43
12.	"Fish"	2:26
Total length:		47:15

== Personnel ==
- Billie Marten - vocals (all tracks), guitar (tracks 2–12), synth (11), piano (11), marimba (10), musical box (7–8, 11)
- Ethan Johns - bass (5–11), guitar (10), drums (2, 3, 5, 7, 9, 11), drum machine (10), drum machine [DFAM] (4, 7, 9, 11), keyboard (2, 3–5, 7, 9–11), mellotron (6), omnichord (9), synth (10), percussion (4–6, 8, 10), production
- Ben Burrows - bass (2)
- Rich Cooper - bass (3), mixing (2–3), production (2–3)
- Dominic Monks - engineering (1–4, 12)
- Bob Ludwig - mastering, mixing (1, 4–12)
