= Explorer (album) =

Studio album by Tilt
- Released: January 24, 2005
- Genre: Trance, progressive trance
- Length: 71:51
- Label: Lost Language
- Producer: Andy Moor, Mick Parks, Mick Wilson

Professional ratings
Review scores
Source	Rating
[PS]	3.5/5 stars

Explorer is a progressive trance album from producer trio Tilt. This is Tilt's first full album of work after over ten years of music production.

== Track listing ==
1. "The World Doesn't Know (Edit)" (8:31)
2. "Goodbye (Edit)" (8:30)
3. "Venus in Transit" (4:48)
4. "Electronic Poledancer" (8:55)
5. "Control Me" feat. Lianne Brookson (8:15)
6. "Tokyo Breaks (Breaks Mix)" feat. Laura Scott (7:01)
7. "Twelve" (9:27)
8. "Explorer" feat. Lianne Brookson (3:18)
9. "Antivalentine" (3:45)
10. "New Day" feat. Lianne Brookson (5:13)
11. "Crescendo" (4:08)
