= Guru Mother =

Studio album by Opus III
- Released: 21 June 1994
- Recorded: 1993–1994
- Genre: Electronic
- Length: 54:47
- Label: PWL/EastWest
- Producer: Opus III

Opus III chronology
Mind Fruit (1992)	Guru Mother (1994)

Professional ratings
Review scores
Source	Rating
AllMusic	2/5 stars
Encyclopedia of Popular Music	2/5 stars
Select	2/5 medals

Guru Mother is the second and final album by British electronic music group Opus III, released on 21 June 1994. It features the dance club hit "When You Made the Mountain". The album contains positive lyrics including one track that is a Sanskrit prayer ("Guru Mother"). It integrates strands of Eastern spirituality (the belief that all nature is divine) with ecology. The CD booklet also included the poem "Let There Be Many Windows in Your Soul" by Ralph Waldo Trine. Singer Kirsty Hawkshaw commented on the booklet: "respect to all those who take big risks to preserve our beautiful countryside. to those who don't care about nature: without it we are nothing. all the sahaja yogis of the world and last but no [sic] least the holy spirit for guiding, inspiring and connecting us all the way."

The cover was created by Colin Heinsen.

== Track listing ==
1. "Dreaming of Now" – 5:52
2. "When You Made the Mountain" – 5:32
3. "Guru Mother" – 5:59
4. "Hand in Hand (Looking for Sweet Inspiration)" – 5:01
5. "Outside" – 6:02
6. "Release the Joy" – 5:51
7. "Elemental" – 6:01
8. "Cozyland?" – 4:10
9. "Sushumna" – 4:58
10. "When She Rises" – 5:21

== Additional information ==
Martin Brammer and Andrea Bell supplied backing vocals.
