= Not Over Yet (Grace song) =

1993 single by Grace

Single by Grace

from the album If I Could Fly
- Released: 1993
- Genre: Dance; trance
- Length: 4:20
- Label: Perfecto; EastWest
- Songwriters: Paul Oakenfold; Rob Davis; Mike Wyzgowski
- Producers: Paul Oakenfold; Steve Osborne

Grace singles chronology
"Not Over Yet" (1993)	"I Want to Live" (1995)

Music video
- "Not Over Yet" on YouTube

"Not Over Yet" is a song by British dance act Grace. Originally released in 1993 under the band name State of Grace, it was re-released in March 1995 as the first single from their only album, If I Could Fly (1996). It received critical acclaim from music critics, peaking at number six on the UK Singles Chart and number one on the US Billboard Dance Club Play chart. Lead vocals and backing vocals were performed by singer Patti Low. In 1995, the lead vocals were replaced by new frontwoman and singer, Dominique Atkins, for the album release, although Low's backing vocals remained in place. The woman who appears in the accompanying music video is Low.

In 1999, "Not Over Yet" was re-released by Warner Music through their Code Blue dance label with new remixes by Matt Darey and Breeder, crediting the release to Planet Perfecto. It reached the Top 20, peaking at number 16. Oakenfold also used it with much less singing in another remix called "Not Over", which appeared on his second album, A Lively Mind (2006).

== Background and release ==
British producer, remixer and DJ Paul Oakenfold wrote the lyrics to "Not Over Yet" with Rob Davis and Mike Wyzgowski. Davis used to be in the British glam rock band Mud. They worked on some ideas in Davis' studio at his house in Epsom. Oakenfold told in 2025 about the inspiration of the song, "Dance music was starting to become very popular in Britain. I mean, it was more of a movement. The youth culture of that day was becoming club culture. Dance music was spreading all over the UK, and we were looking to make dance records, records that with strong songs, uplifting melodies, and great beats. And that's where mine and primarily Rob's relationship started." He met singer Patty Low through Davis, and thought her voice was perfect for the record at the time. "Not Over Yet" was produced by Oakenfold with Steve Osborne. About the production process, Oakenfold said, "A week. 10 hours a day. Long days. We would work long days. I mean sometimes we'd start at midday. Sometimes I'd still be in the studio at 2:00 in the morning. Yeah. I mean, and don't get me wrong, this was enjoyable. I mean, we loved it. And then we may stop three days in and go, 'The drums still ain't right.' And redo it all again. That was our process."

Because the producers, songwriters and engineers were a collective, with Oakenfold as DJ, he didn't want to release the track under his own name and released it in 1993 under the name State of Grace. "Not Over Yet" was met with great support from fellow DJs and specialist radio. But didn't make it into the pop charts at the time. In 1995, due to great demand that the record should be re-released, it was released under the new name Grace, with new remixes picked by Oakenfold. It reached number six on the UK Singles Chart on 9 April 1995, and Grace performed the song on British record chart television programme Top of the Pops. Oakenfold didn't expect the re-release to do so well. According to him, "Not Over Yet" is Perfecto Records' best-sellling release, having sold more than 400,000 singles. After this success and because the act now had a setup and a sound, they needed a front person and came across singer Dominique Atkins. They were now writing follow-ups and felt Atkins was right to be the new singer of Grace. The act got on to support Michael Jackson at Wembley Stadium.

== Critical reception ==
"Not Over Yet" was met with critical acclaim from music critics. Scottish Aberdeen Press and Journal described the song as "uplifting". AllMusic editor Michael Gallucci felt that it "makes any sort of lasting impression". J.D. Considine from The Baltimore Sun remarked in his review of If I Could Fly, "But rather than try to make the listener dance, as so many divas do, Grace would rather entice us — and there's something wonderfully inviting about that." Larry Flick from Billboard magazine wrote, "Grace has it all—a highly videogenic image, an angelic voice, and the ability to write material that deftly straddles commercial viability and underground hipness. She has already wooed punters in her native U.K. with this silky slice of trance/disco, and early reaction from tastemaking radio-programmers hints that even greater stateside success is on the horizon." In his weekly UK chart commentary, James Masterton viewed it as "another dance hit from the Perfecto stable, wildly commercial and sending clubgoers wild the country over". Later, writing for Dotmusic, he felt it is "easily one of the best dance hits of the year so far".

Mixmag named it Single of the Week, adding, "Quite simply the best record I have heard in months. Vibrant, passionate and ultimately spiritual." Pan-European magazine Music & Media commented, "Not over yet? No way, it's only just beginning, the renewed appreciation of synth or electro pop—of course in a fashionable new dance coat. The girl sings gracefully in a sea of sequencers." James Hamilton from Music Week's RM Dance Update called it a "sweetly cooed commercial techno scamperer" and a "haunting sweet girl cooed and fluttery synth chugged attractive simple burbling old raver". Iestyn George from NME praised it as an "epic soundscape of uplifting deep-house". He added, "This is dance music in widescreen with surround sound — plaintive vocal melody, lush piano sounds, crisp percussion, minimalistic trance interludes and random whale noises for all the Orb fans in the, er, house. A contender for single of the year so far? You betcha."

== Chart performance ==
"Not Over Yet" was a top-10 hit in Ireland and the United Kingdom. In the UK, it reached number six on 9 April 1995, during its second week on the UK Singles Chart. It spent eight weeks inside the Top 100, with three weeks inside the top 10. The song reached number one on both the UK Dance Singles Chart and Music Week's Club Chart in the same period. In Ireland, it reached number four. Additionally, it was a top-40 hit in Iceland and Sweden, peaking at numbers 31 and 33, respectively. On the Eurochart Hot 100, "Not Over Yet" reached its peak of number 12 on 22 April, in its second week on the chart after debuting at number 16 the week before. Outside Europe, it reached number one on the US Billboard Dance Club Play chart in 1997. In West Asia, it became a successful top-five hit in Israel, peaking at number three in its fifth week on the chart, on 16 May 1995. It spent 8 weeks inside the Israeli top 30. In Oceania, it reached number 144 in Australia.

== Impact and legacy ==
In 1996, Mixmag ranked "Not Over Yet" number 91 in its "100 Greatest Dance Singles of All Time" list. It was also included as number 15 in their "Mixmag End of Year Lists: 1995". In 1998, DJ Magazine ranked it number 38 in their list of "Top 100 Club Tunes". In November 2011, MTV Dance ranked it number 64 in their list of "The 100 Biggest 90's Dance Anthems of All Time". In 2016, Attitude ranked it number five on their list of "The Top 10 Dance Tunes of the '90s", writing, "There are some beautiful '90s tracks that got lost in the 'novelty' of the '90s, and this is one of them."

In 2018, Mixmag ranked it as one of "The 15 best mid-90s trance tracks", adding, "Dominique Wilkins' soaring vocals steal the show and she delivers one of dance's most recognisable earworms on the hook in a storm of sonic, melody-driven madness." In 2020, RedBull.com ranked it number five in their "10 Underrated Dance Songs from the 1990s That Still Sound Amazing", writing, "Sometimes, you just want a big hands-in-the-air singalong. That's where this trancey pop dinger comes in. [...] What. A. Tune." Same year, Tomorrowland featured the song in their official list of "The Ibiza 500". In 2022, Classic Pop ranked "Not Over Yet" number 21 in their list of the top 40 dance tracks from the 90's, naming it a "90s chart trance cornerstone".

== Remixes ==
In 1999, "Not Over Yet" was re-released by Code Blue, a dance imprint on EastWest (part of Warner Music UK). Whilst the package featured remixes by Matt Darey, Breeder and Da Sickboys, the radio version was not a remix with an edited version of the original radio edit used. The track would be credited to Planet Perfecto featuring Grace, Planet Perfecto being a brand that writer and producer Paul Oakenfold was building. A new video was filmed featuring Sadie Frost though neither Low, Atkins or anyone involved in the track featured in it. The song once again reached the top 20, peaking at number 16. In 2001, BT released the album R&R (Rare & Remixed). A remix of "Not Over Yet" was included on this album, credited as 'Grace (BT's Spirit of Grace)'. A remixed version with new vocals (by Ryan Tedder of OneRepublic), only featuring the words "not over yet" from the original appeared on Oakenfold's 2006 album A Lively Mind as "Not Over". In 2011, new remixes by Perfecto Records were released under the name Grace. The song was sampled by UK live drum act The Stickmen Project on their 2023 track "Not Over Yet" (Spinnin' Records).

== Track listings ==
- UK 12-inch (1993)

A1. "Not Over Yet" (Perfecto mix) – 7:38
B1. "Not Over Yet" (trance mix) – 6:23
B2. "Not Over Yet" (State of Grace Mix) – 6:05

- UK vinyl single, 12-inch (1995)

A1. "Not Over Yet" (Perfecto edit) – 4:20
A2. "Not Over Yet" (Perfecto mix) – 7:38
A3. "Not Over Yet" (Dancing Divaz club mix) – 7:15
B1. "Not Over Yet" (BT's Spirit of Grace) – 12:27
B2. "Not Over Yet" (BT's Peyote dub) – 7:42

- UK 12-inch (B.T. Remixes) (1995)

A. "Not Over Yet" (B.T.'s Spirit of Grace) – 12:30
B. "Not Over Yet" (B.T.'s Peyote dub) – 9:05

- UK CD single (1995)
1. "Not Over Yet" (Perfecto edit) – 4:21
2. "Not Over Yet" (Perfecto mix) – 7:39
3. "Not Over Yet" (Dancing Divaz club mix) – 7:46
4. "Not Over Yet" (B.T.'s Spirit of Grace) – 12:28
5. "Not Over Yet" (B.T.'s Peyote dub) – 7:42
- UK CD single (1999)
1. "Not Over Yet 99" (radio edit) – 3:35
2. "Not Over Yet 99" (Matt Darey remix edit) – 8:11
3. "Not Over Yet 99" (Da Sickboys remix) – 7:38
4. "Not Over Yet 99" (Breeder's It Is Now remix) – 10:25
5. "Not Over Yet 99" (Perfecto edit) – 4:20

== Charts ==
=== Weekly charts ===
Chart (1993)	Peak position
UK Club Chart (Music Week)	84

Chart (1995)	Peak position
Australia (ARIA)	144
Europe (Eurochart Hot 100)	12
Europe (European Dance Radio)	10
Iceland (Íslenski Listinn Topp 40)	31
Ireland (IRMA)	4
Israel (Israeli Singles Chart)	3
Netherlands (Dutch Single Tip)	15
Scotland (OCC)	7
Sweden (Sverigetopplistan)	33
UK Singles (OCC)	6
UK Dance (OCC)	1
UK Airplay (Music Week)	16
UK Club Chart (Music Week)	1
UK Pop Tip Club Chart (Music Week)	4

Chart (1996)	Peak position
UK Dance (OCC)	22

Chart (1997)	Peak position
US Dance Club Play (Billboard)	1

Chart (1999)	Peak position
Australia (ARIA)	90
Belgium (Ultratip Bubbling Under Flanders)	4
Europe (Eurochart Hot 100)	56
Scotland (OCC)	14
UK Singles (OCC)	16
UK Dance (OCC)	2

Chart (2026)	Peak position
Ireland (OCC)	13

=== Year-end charts ===
Chart (1995)	Position
Israel (Israeli Singles Chart)	38
UK Singles (OCC)	92
UK Club Chart (Music Week)	21
UK Pop Tip Club Chart (Music Week)	17

Chart (1999)	Position
UK Club Chart (Music Week)	5

== Release history ==
Region	Version	Date	Format(s)	Label(s)	Ref(s).
United Kingdom	"Not Over Yet"	1993	12-inch vinyl	Perfecto London	
United Kingdom	"Not Over Yet"	27 March 1995	7-inch vinyl; 12-inch vinyl; CD; cassette	Perfecto; EastWest	
Australia	"Not Over Yet"	1 May 1995	CD	Perfecto; EastWest	
United Kingdom	"Not Over Yet '99"	2 August 1999	12-inch vinyl; CD	Code Blue; Perfecto	

== Klaxons version ==
"It's Not Over Yet"

Single by Klaxons

from the album Myths of the Near Future
- Released: 25 June 2007
- Genre: Dance-rock
- Length: 3:35 (album version)
- Label: Polydor
- Songwriters: Paul Oakenfold; Rob Davis; Mike Wyzgowski
- Producer: James Ford

Klaxons singles chronology
"Gravity's Rainbow" (2007)	"It's Not Over Yet" (2007)	"As Above, So Below" (2007)

Music video
- "It's Not Over Yet" on YouTube

"Not Over Yet" was covered by British rock band Klaxons as "It's Not Over Yet" and released as the fifth official single from their debut album, Myths of the Near Future (2007). The track was released as a single on 25 June 2007 featuring an exclusive B-side, "The Night" (a cover of a song by Frankie Valli and the Four Seasons) as well as an exclusive remix by Blende (available through the iTunes Store).

The song, upon its release, entered the UK Singles Chart at number 28 before peaking at number 13 on 7 July 2007. It received extensive airplay on a number of the United Kingdom's top radio stations, such as XFM, as well as receiving moderate airplay on the MTV Two/NME Chart.

The song has been remixed by dubstep artist Skream. The song featured in the Channel 4 advertisement for the finale of the first series of Ugly Betty, and is also featured in many episodes of Hollyoaks. In late 2025, the song was featured in a Betfair advert.

=== Music video ===
The accompanying music video for the track was released in May 2007 and, like most of the band's videos, was directed by Saam Farahmand. It features the band dressed up as samurai, wielding swords to destroy flying prism shaped objects.

=== Track listings ===
- CD single
1. "It's Not Over Yet" – 3:35
2. "My Love" [BBC Radio 1 Session] (Justin Timberlake and T.I. cover)
- 7-inch vinyl (clear-colored)
1. "It's Not Over Yet" – 3:35
2. "The Night" (Frankie Valli and the Four Seasons Cover)
- Etched 7-inch vinyl
1. "It's Not Over Yet" – 3:35

=== Charts ===
==== Weekly charts ====
Chart (2007)	Peak position
Belgium (Ultratip Bubbling Under Flanders)	12
Scottish Singles Sales (Official Charts)	12
UK Singles (Official Charts)	13

==== Year-end charts ====
Chart (2007)	Position
UK Singles (OCC)	148

=== Certifications ===
Region	Certification	Certified units/sales
United Kingdom (BPI)	Silver	200,000^{‡}
^{‡} Sales+streaming figures based on certification alone.
