= Billie Marten =

British singer-songwriter

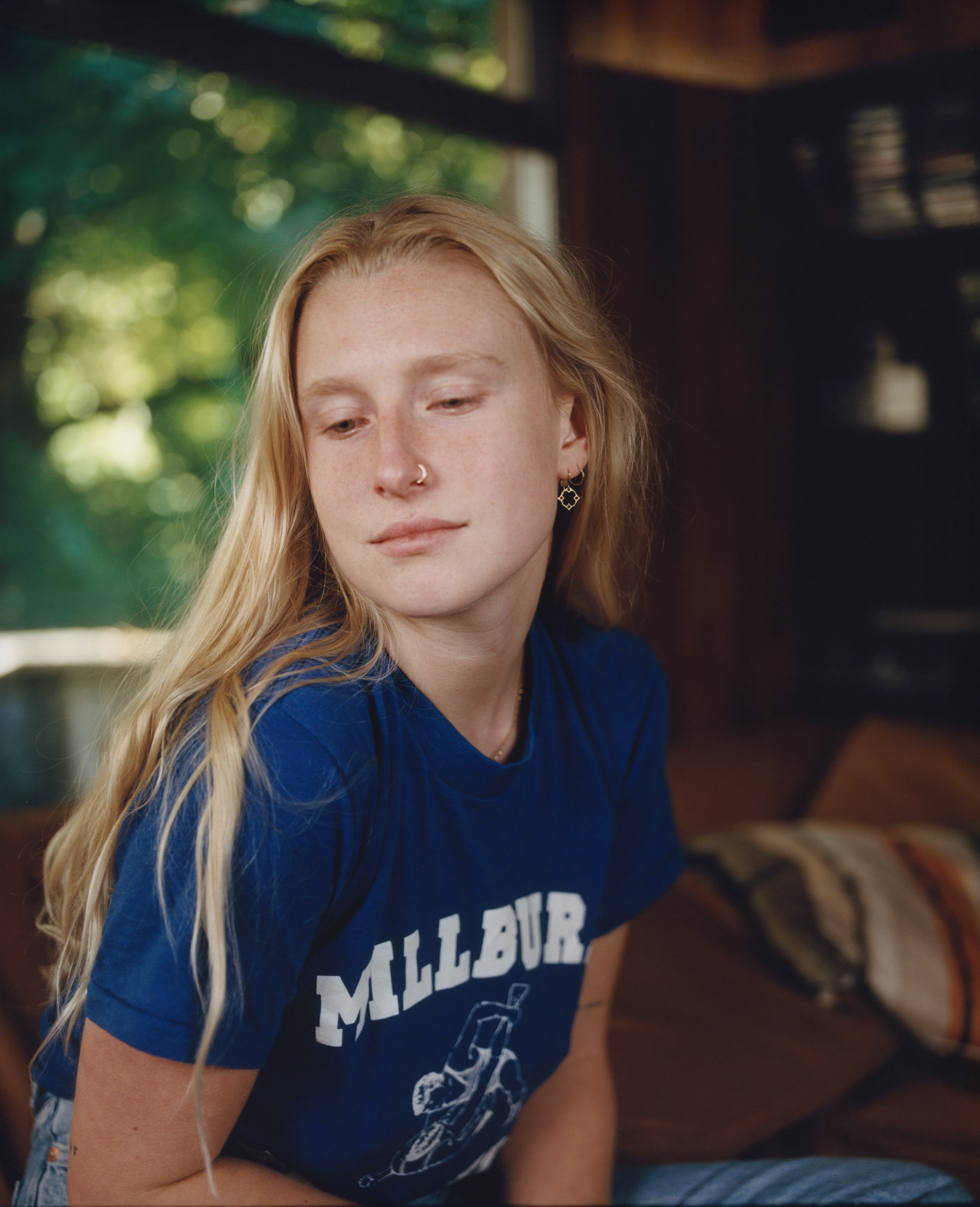
- Marten in 2023

Background information
- Born: Isabella Sophie Tweddle; 27 May 1999 (age 27); Ripon, England
- Genres: Acoustic
- Instruments: Guitar; piano
- Years active: 2014–present
- Label: Fiction
- Website: billiemarten.com

Isabella Sophie Tweddle (born 27 May 1999), better known under the stage name Billie Marten, is a British singer-songwriter and musician from Ripon in North Yorkshire. Her stage name came from her family's desire to keep her real name private because her music career started when she was a teen. She first came to prominence at the age of twelve when a video on YouTube of her singing garnered thousands of views. She released her first EP at the age of fifteen in 2014, and her second EP a year later. At the end of 2015, she was nominated for BBC's Sound of 2016 award. She has since released five full-length albums: Writing of Blues and Yellows, Feeding Seahorses by Hand, Flora Fauna, Drop Cherries, and Dog Eared, all of which have received critical acclaim. Her style can be described as singer-songwriter and folk.

== Early life ==
Isabella (or "Billie") Tweddle was born 27 May 1999 at a home in Risplith in North Yorkshire. She began playing guitar and singing when she was seven or eight and started writing songs soon afterwards. By the age of nine, she had her own YouTube channel on which she posted covers of pop songs, mostly for the benefit of her grandparents who live in France. When she was twelve, she performed some music sessions for a local Yorkshire based YouTube channel called Ont' Sofa. Among the songs she performed was a cover version of Lucy Rose's "Middle of the Bed", which quickly received thousands of views. In a later interview, Marten said "I didn't understand how quickly it could spread. I was super young and it was crazy." She was educated at Ripon Grammar School. She has a brother who is 10 years older than her. Her father is a copywriter and her mother is a teacher. With the money she received after signing a record deal with Sony at age 16, she purchased a Series One Land Rover Defender. Since she did not yet have a driving licence, her father drove the vehicle.

== Music career ==
In May 2014, just before her fifteenth birthday, Billie Marten released the single "Ribbon" via Burberry's curation program. She wrote the single with Fiona Bevan the previous year. According to Marten, one theme of "Ribbon" is "the elusiveness of the city, and how quickly you can lose something amongst the people and tube stations." "Ribbon" was inspired by her train journeys from Yorkshire to London to perform at concerts when she was a teenager. On 23 June 2014, she released her debut EP Ribbon. In August 2014, Marten played the BBC Introducing stage at the Reading Festival. She described her music in December 2014 as "a mix between acoustic and quite folky and a little indie."

In January 2015, Marten signed to Chess Club Records, a division of Sony Music and their RCA Records recording label. She released the single "Heavy Weather" in April 2015, which premiered on Huw Stephens' BBC Radio 1 show. A 7" vinyl version of "Heavy Weather" was released in May with her cover version of Royal Blood's "Out of the Black" on the B-side. She released the single "Bird" in September 2015. She wrote the song with Olivia Broadfield, and according to Marten, the song is about "how words can truly affect people, not always for the right reasons". She toured for the first time in October 2015 as the supporting act for Lucy Rose. Marten released her second EP As Long As in November 2015.

In November 2015, she was nominated for the BBC Sound of 2016. She released her first full-length album, Writing of Blues and Yellows, to critical aclaim, on 23 September 2016.

In 2018, Marten's "Blue Sea, Red Sea", which was released as a single for her second album, featured as Annie Mac's hottest record on Radio 1. Her second LP, Feeding Seahorses by Hand, was released 26 April 2019. In 2019, Chess Club, on which Marten had previously released two albums and several EPs, ended their partnership with Sony, leading to her separation from Sony. She expressed frustration with the large amount of money that record labels earn from streaming music, leaving artists struggling financially, saying, "Most people I know that have a top 10 album right now are on Universal Credit." She described being dropped by Sony as "the best day of my life...This was my saving grace." She later signed with Fiction Records in 2020; during mandatory lockdown orders in the United Kingdom.

In January 2021, Marten announced her third album titled Flora Fauna, which was released on 21 May 2021. In January 2023, she announced her fourth studio album titled Drop Cherries. Marten explained that the title alludes to dropping everything to express your love for a person. The album was released on 7 April 2023.

On 11 October 2024, Marten released the single "Crown." On 19 March 2025, Marten released the single "Feeling," and announced her fifth studio album, Dog Eared. She released two other singles from the album, "Leap Year" and "Swing." The album was released worldwide on 18 July 2025.

== Musical Influences ==
Marten's musical influences include Damien Rice, Nick Drake, Kate Bush, John Martyn, Joni Mitchell, Loudon Wainwright, Brian Eno, Joan Armatrading, and Jeff Buckley. She was introduced to many of these artists through her parents' record collections.

English singer songwriter, Lucy Rose was one of her influences during her adolescence.

== Personal life ==
At the age of 18, Marten was diagnosed with severe seasonal affective disorder (SAD), causing depression and anxiety. After her first album and touring campaign concluded, Marten got a job working in a London pub for several months—this job served as inspiration for the song "Toulouse" from her second album. The title refers to Henri de Toulouse-Lautrec, a French illustrator. Her favourite book is The Stranger by Albert Camus.

Marten attended university for English Literature, but decided to drop out after six weeks. During the time she was enrolled, she continued pursuing her musical career by touring, but also attended university twice a week, on Mondays and Fridays. She recalls losing sleep over reading Oliver Twist. However, Marten described this period in a 2019 podcast with Kate McGill as leaving her feeling discouraged by the lack of feedback on her work and by classmates who came unprepared and didn't show interest in assignments.

Marten resides in Hackney, a borough in East London with her partner, Will Taylor of Flyte, who she has dated since 2019. During 2020, she briefly moved back to her parents' home in North Yorkshire for 6 months due to the mandatory COVID-19 lockdown in the United Kingdom. Her time spent in Yorkshire during lockdown served as inspiration for her third album.

Her mother is Christian, and her father is an atheist. As such, Marten was raised with different views on religion and does not follow a particular religion. She cites Robin Hood's Bay, a small fishing village in Yorkshire, as one of her favourite places in the world. Marten is left-handed.

In a July 2025 interview with The Independent, Marten revealed that although her music has made money on streaming platforms, she has never personally benefited from streaming sales financially. She further explained that she never recouped money spent on the two albums she made under Sony.

== Discography ==
=== Studio albums ===
Title	Details	Peak chart positions
Title	Details	UK
Writing of Blues and Yellows	Released: 23 September 2016; Label: RCA; Format: CD, vinyl, digital download	53
Feeding Seahorses by Hand	Released: 26 April 2019; Label: RCA; Format: CD, vinyl, digital download	—
Flora Fauna	Released: 21 May 2021; Label: Fiction; Format: CD, vinyl, digital download	—
Drop Cherries	Released: 7 April 2023; Label: Fiction; Format: CD, vinyl, digital download	57
Dog Eared	Released: 18 July 2025; Label: Fiction; Format: CD, vinyl, digital download	46

=== Extended plays ===
Title	Details
Ribbon	Released: 23 June 2014; Label: Spilt Milk Records; Format: Digital download
As Long As	Released: 13 November 2015; Label: Chess Club Records; Formats: 10" vinyl, Digital download
Acoustic EP	Released: 10 November 2021; Label: Fiction; Formats: Digital download

=== Singles ===
Title	Year	Peak chart positions	Album
Title	Year	US AAA	Album
"Ribbon"	2014	—	Ribbon
"Heavy Weather"	2015	—	Writing of Blues and Yellows
"Out of the Black"	2015	—	Writing of Blues and Yellows (Deluxe Version)
"Bird"	2015	—	Writing of Blues and Yellows
"As Long As"	2015	—	As Long As
"Milk & Honey"	2016	—	Writing of Blues and Yellows
"La Lune"	2016	—	Writing of Blues and Yellows
"Lionhearted"	2016	—	Writing of Blues and Yellows
"Live"	2016	—	Writing of Blues and Yellows
"Mice"	2018	—	Feeding Seahorses by Hand
"Blue Sea, Red Sea"	2018	—	Feeding Seahorses by Hand
"Betsy"	2019	—	Feeding Seahorses by Hand
"Cartoon People"	2019	—	Feeding Seahorses by Hand
"swear 2 g-d"	2019	—	Non-album single
"Orange Tree"	2020	—	Happy Place
"Garden of Eden"	2021	—	Flora Fauna
"Creature of Mine"	2021	—	Flora Fauna
"Human Replacement"	2021	—	Flora Fauna
"Liquid Love"	2021	—	Flora Fauna
"This Is How We Move"	2023	—	Drop Cherries
"Nothing But Mine"	2023	—	Drop Cherries
"I Can't Get My Head Around You"	2023	—	Drop Cherries
"God Above"	2023	—	Drop Cherries
"Crown"	2024	—	Dog Eared
"Feeling"	2025	39	Dog Eared
"Leap Year"	2025	—	Dog Eared
"Swing"	2025	—	Dog Eared
"Clover"	2025	—	Dog Eared

== Music videos ==
Title	Year	Director	Ref.
"Ribbon"	2014	–	
"Heavy Weather"	2015	Daniel Broadley	
"Bird"	2015	Franklyn Banks	
"Milk & Honey"	2016	Rob Brandon	
"La Lune"	2016		

== Awards and nominations ==
Year	Organisation	Award	Result
2016	BBC	Sound of...2016	Nominated
