= Sam Owens =

American musician

- How To Build A Clock, released October 17, 2010.

Background information
- Origin: Washington, U.S.
- Genres: Folk, blues, indie rock, soul
- Years active: 2003–present
- Label: None
- Website: samowens.us

Sam Owens is an American musician/artist originally from Washington, now based in Brooklyn, New York.

== History ==
Sam Owens began his musical career in Los Angeles in 2002, where he helped form the band The Colour. He played the bass guitar in the band until 2005 when he left before they signed with Lizard King Records. Owens began to write songs solo and has written four albums according to a blog press. Owens has a few albums that circled a small group friends and friends of friends, however songs from the previous albums are no longer available. His previous album titles are Raincoat Jones, Garden of Leaves, and Land of the Free.

"He writes all the time – just writes and writes – records things as they come to him and lets his friends hear them when they ask – and some of those friends talk about him in other quarters, when he's not around. They cannot hide their amazement in terms of what he's got cooking, what he could eventually cook, given the right kitchen. All it took was Matt Maust of the Cold War Kids mentioning that he was borrowing Sam's sleeping bag, amidst frigid January temperatures, listening to his new songs as he huddled and bundled in Seattle." – Sean Moeller of Daytrotter.

== Current work ==
In October 2010, he officially released an album through iTunes, called How to Build a Clock, with Owens performing and recording all the elements in his studio at the foot of the Olympic Mountains in Washington State. Owens currently resides in Brooklyn, New York.

== Design ==
As a graphic artist, Owens has created album packaging for Dustin Kensrue of Thrice and Texas-based band Midlake among many others. He has also contributed to various publications, including Damon Dash's magazine America Nu, and influential brands Ace Hotel and Urban Outfitters.
