= Sam Mollison =

British singer and record producer

Sam Mollison is an electronic music producer and vocalist. He has collaborated with Sasha for his release of "Magic" and The Qat Collection. He has also had his own work released on FFRR Records and INCredible.

Mollison's 1992 release "Will You Love Me in the Morning" was a popular choice in Northern English dance music venues.
