= Risplith =

Village in North Yorkshire, England

Coordinates: 54.114530°N 1.623190°W

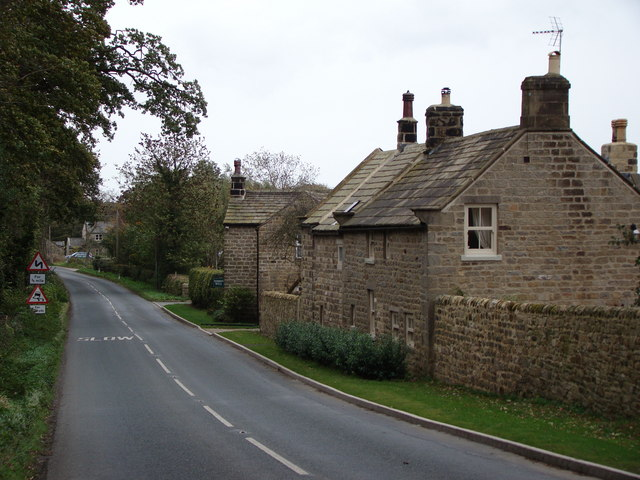
- Street traversing the village

- Location within North Yorkshire
- OS grid reference: SE247688
- Unitary authority: North Yorkshire
- Ceremonial county: North Yorkshire
- Region: Yorkshire and the Humber
- Country: England
- Sovereign state: United Kingdom
- Post town: Ripon
- Postcode district: HG4
- Police: North Yorkshire
- Fire: North Yorkshire
- Ambulance: Yorkshire

Risplith is a village in the civil parish of Sawley, in the county of North Yorkshire, England. It is about 4 miles (6.4 km) west of Ripon on the B6265 road to Pateley Bridge. The name is believed to derive from Old Norse of slope overgrown with brushwood.

The hamlet was previously in the Wapentake of Claro. Until 1974 it was part of the West Riding of Yorkshire. From 1974 to 2023 it was part of the Borough of Harrogate, it is now administered by the unitary North Yorkshire Council.

An ice-cream manufacturer works in the village with a shop and restaurant where passers-by can stop and watch ice-cream being made. In 2018, it was named as one of Britain's best ice-cream parlours by The Daily Telegraph.

Transport to Ripon and Harrogate is provided by the three times daily bus service (each way).
