= Tilt (British band) =

British electronic music duo

TILT
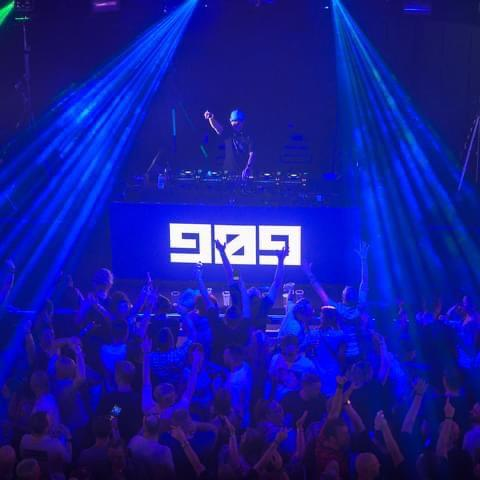
- TILT performing in June 2023

Background information
- Origin: Coventry, England
- Genre: Electronic dance music
- Years active: 1993–present
- Labels: Warner Music; Perfecto Records; Deconstruction Records
- Members: Mick Park; Nic Britton
- Past members: Michael Wilson; John Graham; Andy Moor
- Website: https://www.tiltofficialuk.com

Tilt (stylised as TILT) are an English electronic music group founded in Coventry in 1993 by Mick Park, Michael Wilson, and John Graham. The current line-up comprises Mick Park and Nic Britton.

== History ==
Formed in Coventry, by Mick Park and Michael Wilson who became residents in 1990 at The Eclipse, the first legal all night rave venue in the UK. In 1993, they met with John Graham and Tilt was formed. 3 years later, out of their studios in Stoke-on-Trent, their first hit single "I Dream", released on Paul Oakenfold's Perfecto Records.

After multiple successful singles including "My Spirit", "Places", and the captivating "Butterfly", along with "Rendezvous", which they recorded with Paul van Dyk, they saw themselves signed to Hooj Choons, the label of dance labels in that era.

The Hooj Choons label released "Invisible", Top 20 in the UK singles chart. A cover version of Robert Miles's "Children" and their "Dark Science EP" and at this point had reckoned seven UK chart hits.

In 1997, they collaborated with the legendary Sex Pistols Manager Malcolm McLaren on Lakme 'The Bell Song' – which received critical acclaim. Graham left Tilt in 1999 to pursue his solo career and Parks and Wilson continued to release singles until joined by Andy Moor which saw the release of the album, Explorer, on Hooj Choons subsidiary label, Lost Language.

Moor and Wilson subsequently left the band to pursue their own paths and in 2011, Nic Britton re-joined Mick Park as TILT with releases on Black Hole Recordings.

The production of 'No Other Day' featured Maria Nayler ("Angry Skies" & "Headstrong") and re-released the Oakey favourite "The World Doesn’t Know" for Lost Language's 100th release.

Mick Park and Nic Britton celebrated their remix of Cosmos "Take Me With You", which received support by BBC Radio 1 and Kiss (UK radio station). They have since collaborated with Ben Shaw, Sam Mollison and Dominique Atkins (also known as Grace). They have released productions on labels including Mesmeric Records, Black Hole Recordings, Perfecto Records, Pro B-Tech and Lost Language and have received supported by a plethora of DJ's including Carl Cox, John Digweed, Hernan Cattaneo, Nick Warren, Paul Oakenfold and Pete Tong.

2021/22 reunited Park with Wilson on a remix of "Gangsters" (The Specials), used by the Coventry City of Culture for their 2021 celebrations.

== Baroque Records ==
Baroque Records
- Founder: Mick Parks, Mick Wilson
- Status: Active
- Country of origin: UK

Baroque Records is an electronic music label created by Parks and Wilson. It is based in the United Kingdom. As well as Tilt, it has featured singles from Quivver, Benz & MD, and Shiloh.

== Selected discography ==
=== Albums ===
- 2005: Explorer (Lost Language)
- 2013: Stop the World Revolving (compilation) (Lost Language)
- 2014: Resonator (Pro B Tech Records)

=== Singles ===
- 1995: "I Dream" (UK #69) (Warner Music / Perfecto)
- 1997: "My Spirit" (UK #61) (Warner Music / Perfecto)
- 1997: "Places" (UK #64) (Warner Music / Perfecto)
- 1998: "Butterfly" (UK #41) (US #31) (feat. Zee) (Warner Music / Perfecto)
- 1999: "Children" (UK #51) (Deconstruction Records)
- 1999: "Invisible" (UK #20) (Hooj Choons)
- 1999: "Angry Skies" (TILT & Maria Nayler)(Deconstruction Records)
- 2000: Dark Science EP (UK #55) (Hooj Choons)
- 2002: "Headstrong" (feat. Maria Nayler) (Baroque Records)
- 2004: "The World Doesn't Know" (UK #36) (Lost Language)
- 2004: "Twelve" (Lost Language)
- 2011: The Century EP (Lost Language)
- 2013: "My Release" (feat. Maria Nayler) (Black Hole Recordings)
- 2013: "Here Is Not Now" (feat. Sam Mollison) (Pro B Tech Records)
- 2015: "30 Hits of Acid" (feat. G-Man) (Pro B Tech Records)
- 2015: "Quad" (Stripped Recordings)
- 2018: "Black Samurai" (Tactal Hots Music)
- 2018: "Sinai" (Tactal Hots Music)
