= Olivia Broadfield =

English singer-songwriter

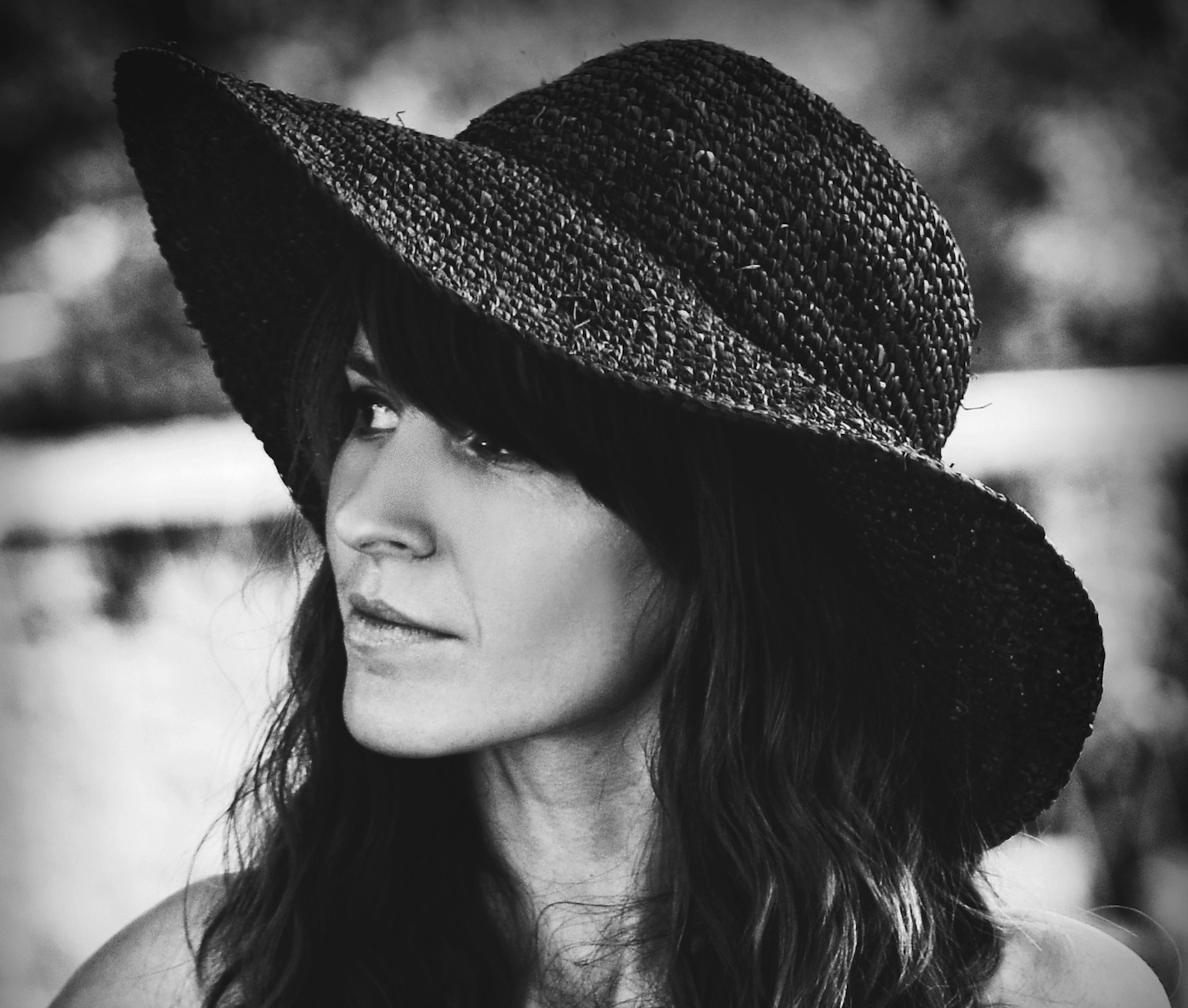

Background information
- Born: 1981 (age 44–45); Coventry, Warwickshire, England
- Origin: Leicestershire, England
- Genres: singer-songwriter, alternative
- Instruments: Vocals, piano, guitar
- Years active: 2007–present
- Label: Vagrant
- Website: www.oliviabroadfield.co.uk

Olivia Broadfield is an English singer-songwriter. She specialises in writing songs for TV and film. Her songs have been heard on shows such as Grey's Anatomy, Ghost Whisperer, The Vampire Diaries, and The Split.

== Early life ==
Broadfield was born in Coventry in 1981.

== Career ==
After placements on MTV reality television shows The Hills and The Real World in 2008, Broadfield gained the notice of blogger Perez Hilton and TV star Jessica Simpson. She signed a record deal with U.S.-based Vagrant Records in February 2009. Her debut album, Eyes Wide Open, was released in the U.S. on 14 July 2009. The song "Don't Cry" was released as a single.

In 2011, Broadfield signed a publishing deal with Sony/ATV and her second album, This Beautiful War, was released. Songs from the album featured on Grey's Anatomy, 90210, Arrow, The Nine Lives of Chloe King, The Vampire Diaries and Chasing Life. Her third album, Paper Dolls (2013), was released through Pledge Music and was heard on Vampire Diaries, About A Boy, Switched at Birth and The Night Shift.

In 2014, Broadfield co-wrote "Bird" with Billie Marten. In 2015, the song was released and was played on BBC Radio 1 and Radio 2, featured as Jo Whiley's 'New Favourite Thing' and Annie Mac's 'Tune of the Week'; it also got the attention of Ed Sheeran who declared it "stunning" to his 20 million followers.

In 2015, Broadfield released her album Jumberlack and signed a deal with Secretly Canadian. The song Wishing and Waiting from this album was then featured in the 2017 film Tragedy Girls.

In 2020, Broadfield worked on the BBC One series The Split, writing songs for each of the six episodes of season 2.

In 2022, Broadfield returned to The Split for the third and final series. The soundtrack reached No.2 on the itunes album chart and songs from the show were played by Claudia Winkleman, Dermot O'Leary and Edith Bowman on BBC Radio 2.

In 2022, Broadfield signed an exclusive publishing deal with Kassner Music.

In 2024, Broadfield was invited back by Sister (production company) and writer Abi Morgan to work on the Christmas special, The Split:Barcelona. The morning after the show aired, the soundtrack to the show was No. 1 on the itunes songwriter chart and the previous soundtracks from Series 2 and 3 re-entered the Top 10.
