= Drop Cherries =

Studio album by Billie Marten
- Released: 7 April 2023
- Genre: English folk music
- Length: 43:52
- Label: Fiction
- Producers: Billie Marten; Dom Monks

Billie Marten chronology
Acoustic EP (2021)	Drop Cherries (2023)	Dog Eared (2025)

Drop Cherries is the fourth studio album by the British singer-songwriter Billie Marten, released on 7 April 2023 by Fiction Records.

== Critical reception ==
Editors at AnyDecentMusic? rated this album a 7.6 out of 10, aggregating seven scores. According to the review aggregator Metacritic, Drop Cherries received "universal acclaim" based on a weighted average score of 82 out of 100 from seven critic scores. Amrit Virdi of Clash Music scored this release an 8 out of 10, ending his review, "a conceptual album which feels honest and authentic, 'Drop Cherries' showcases the best of her musical ability while being lyrically complex – it's another strong record for Billie Marten to add to her repertoire". Dork's Laura Freyaldehoven scored this album 4 out of 5 stars, calling it a "soundtrack of smouldering percussions and free-roaming melodies, Billie tells stories of love and longing, of forgiveness and the give-and-take that is the unspoken foundation of every relationship" where "each song uncovers a different aspect of what it means to love and be loved". At Gigwise, Samantha Andrews rated this release 8 out of 10 stars, describing the listening experience as "it feels like you have stumbled onto something truly enchanting" where each song "offers a new story or perspective for you to get lost in with each listen". In The Independent, Annabel Nugent gave Drop Cherries 5 out of 5 stars, praising Marten's vocals, lyrics, and "folky naturalism".

Steven Loftin of The Line of Best Fit gave this release a 7 out of 10 for having "dreamy sounds... with a spring breeze and a heavenly glow" that he recommends will have special importance to those who have experienced heartbreak. In The Skinny, Abbie Aitken gave this work 4 out of 5 stars, stating that Marten "has beautifully recollected a collection of intimate feelings, thoughts and sentiments, transforming them into introspective songs that are hauntingly relatable to any listener". Editors of The Daily Telegraph shortlisted this as one of the best albums of the week and critic James Hall gave it 3 stars out of 5, calling it "a confident, interesting and accomplished album" that has "stained elegance", but that is weaker than contemporaries such as Weyes Blood, Lana Del Rey, Laura Marling, and Nina Nastasia. An 8 out of 10 came from Wyndham Wallace in Uncut, who compares this music favorably to Liz Fraser.

== Track listing ==
All songs written by Billie Marten.

1. "New Idea" – 2:44
2. "God Above" – 3:26
3. "Just Us" – 2:28
4. "I Can't Get My Head Around You" – 3:26
5. "Willow" – 3:40
6. "Acid Tooth" – 3:27
7. "Devil Swim" – 3:37
8. "I Bend to Him" – 2:40
9. "Nothing But Mine" – 3:24
10. "Arrows" – 3:23
11. "Tongue" – 4:11
12. "This Is How We Move" – 3:06
13. "Drop Cherries" – 4:19

== Personnel ==
- Billie Marten – guitar, vocals
- Yasmina Aoun – design
- Katie Silvester – photography

== Charts ==
Chart performance for Drop Cherries
Chart (2023)	Peak position
Scottish Albums (Official Charts)	19
UK Albums (Official Charts)	57
UK Folk Albums (Official Charts)	1

== See also ==
- 2023 in British music
- List of 2023 albums
