= It's a Fine Day =

1983 single by Jane

"It's a Fine Day" is a song written by English poet and musician Edward Barton. It was originally recorded a cappella in 1983 by Jane Lancaster as Jane and later by Opus III, for whom it was a major international hit in 1992.

== Original recording by Jane ==
"It's a Fine Day"

Single by Jane

from the album Jane and Barton
- B-side: "Of All Leaves Were Falling"
- Released: 1983
- Label: Cherry Red
- Songwriter: Edward Barton

Music video
- "It's a Fine Day" on YouTube

Barton wrote the lyrics as a poem when living in the Hulme area of Manchester. It was originally sung unaccompanied by, and credited to, "Jane" – that is, Jane Lancaster, Barton's girlfriend. They recorded and released it independently, and it was played by radio DJ John Peel. It was then heard by Iain McNay of Cherry Red Records, who obtained the rights to the record and released it more widely on his label in 1983.

The song reached number five on the UK Indie Chart and later appeared, credited to Jane and Barton, on their eponymous album, Jane and Barton. It was later used in a 1986 commercial for Kleenex tissue in Japan, which itself attracted attention as a Japanese urban legend.

Jane's version of the song was rereleased as a CD single in the United Kingdom in 1993, accompanied by a new remix by A Guy Called Gerald.

=== Charts ===
Chart (1983)	Peak position
UK Singles Chart (OCC)	87
UK Indie (OCC)	5

== Opus III version ==
"It's a Fine Day"

Single by Opus III

from the album Mind Fruit
- B-side: "Evolution Rush"
- Released: 10 February 1992
- Studio: Fluffy Trees
- Genre: Techno; ambient
- Length: 3:36
- Label: PWL International
- Songwriter: Edward Barton
- Producer: Opus III

Opus III singles chronology
"It's a Fine Day" (1992)	"I Talk to the Wind" (1992)

Music video
- "It's a Fine Day" on YouTube

In 1992, "It's a Fine Day" was covered by English electronic music group Opus III, whose lead vocalist was Kirsty Hawkshaw. It was their debut and released in February 1992 by PWL International as the first single from their album, Mind Fruit (1992). The single reached number five in the United Kingdom and number one in Greece and on the US Billboard Dance Club Play chart. Its accompanying music video was directed by David Betteridge. In 2010, the song was named the 182nd best track of the 1990s by Pitchfork Media. The two chief differences from Jane's original were that this version was not recorded a cappella but with a full instrumental accompaniment, and that it used only the chorus of the original song's lyrics.

=== Background and release ===
At the time of the release, the producers (i.e., Kevin Dodds, Ian Munro, and Nigel Walton—the other three member of Opus III) couldn't legally reveal themselves, as they were under contract as A.S.K. to MCA Records UK. Instead, the group spun a wholly fabricated story that the producers had stumbled on classically trained vocalist Kirsty Hawkshaw, hearing her sing while they were up a tree recording the sounds of birds on a DAT recorder at a Spiral Tribe rave in the Hertfordshire woods to sample for a new track. Hawkshaw is the daughter of British composer and record producer Alan Hawkshaw, and was noticed by the producers at a rave in 1990. The trio had released a single called "Dream", when she was invited to appear on stage as their dancer. Later, Hawkshaw received a tape with "It's a Fine Day", which sampled Jane Lancaster's vocal from the original. She told DJ Mag in 2024, that she got goosebumps hearing the track, "I was like, "Oh my God, this, this is me, this is my song. This is something I resonate with. It's beautiful. It's positive." She rang Dodds up the next day, telling him that she definitely wanted to do the song.

"It's a Fine Day" was recorded in a kitchen in Sunderland. The producers wanted Hawkshaw to sing it exactly like Jane. After a few initial failed attempts, their hairdresser arrived with his little boy, who had a calming presence on Hawkshaw. She said, "I know what I'm going to do, I'm going to sing to that little boy what it's like to be in a field, looking at all your friends in the eyes and really connecting at four in the morning as the sun is rising. And that's when the magic happened." Pete Tong of BBC Radio 1 championed the track and started playing it on the radio and Pete Waterman of PWL Records wanted to release it. It was white labelled and sent out to DJs. When "It's a Fine Day" reached number ten on the UK Singles Chart, the band performed on the Top of the Pops, which had been Hawkshaw's childhood dream.

Kirsty Hawkshaw has since remade the song three times: in 2002 with Mike Koglin, in 2008 with Kinky Roland, and in 2019 as "Fine Day 2K19". In 2012, the song was remixed by Hungarian artist Sonic Entropy.

=== Critical reception ===
Larry Flick from Billboard magazine felt the "quirky dance act" has made a "near-perfect, radio-friendly ditty", noting that it's "empowered with a potent blend of, ethereal female vocals, a hypnotic hook, and an electro-hip beat." Andy Kastanas from The Charlotte Observer named it "a dance-pop tune with "rave" undertones and pretty female vocals that'll make your day better than fine." Marisa Fox from Entertainment Weekly described it as a "bubble-gummy dance track", adding that "this self-described ambient-techno group lives up to the genre’s esoteric side." Dave Sholin from Gavin Report replied on the circulating story around the group, "A likely story. In any case, it was a fortunate meeting that gave life to this hot track." Dave Simpson from Melody Maker complimented it as "a masterstroke in conception and execution", stating that "in five years' time, anyone searching for the sound and spirit of early '92 won't be far from 'It's a Fine Day'".

Alan Jones from Music Week found that "it's the nearest thing yet to an ambient rave. Watch it chase Kylie and 2 Unlimited up the chart." Wendi Cermak from The Network Forty wrote, "Like nothing else out there, this track is simultaneously spacey and driving, bordering on the current Euro-rave movement." Danny Scott from Select remarked its "surreal ambient house sounds". Seamus Quinn from NME said, "Believe me when I tell you that this will be a monster hit. It's also a very odd record. It combines an element of Temper Temper's 'It's All Outta Loving You' with deliciously dreamy female vocals and a thumping rhythm track." He concluded, "A winner." Another NME editor, Stephen Dalton, felt it's "the sound of spring arriving early. You'll love it." And Roger Morton named it "a seductive piece of lightweight house, which takes Crystal Waters style breezy beats and nursery school melodies, and showers them with blossom and balloons." Andy Beevers from the Record Mirror Dance Update named it "one of the year's most unusual hits." Mark Frith from Smash Hits was less enthustiastic, giving it two out of five, but stated that it "has become something of a dance anthem."

=== Retrospective response ===
AllMusic editor MacKenzie Wilson said the song is "melodically enchanting with loopy trance vibes and textured synth waves", noting Kirsty Hawkshaw's "dove-like vocals transcended into freewheeling soundscapes". In 1999, Tom Ewing of Freaky Trigger called it a "precious lullaby for a sleepless generation." In 2010, "It's a Fine Day" was ranked number 182 in Pitchfork Media's list of "The Top 200 Tracks of the 1990s".

=== Chart performance ===
In Europe, "It's a Fine Day" peaked at number one in Greece, as well as number two in Spain. It entered the top 10 in Finland, Ireland, Italy and the United Kingdom, peaking at No. 5 during its second week on the UK Singles Chart, on 23 February 1992. It spent two weeks at that position and ended up at number 60 on the UK year-end chart. On the UK Dance Singles Chart, it reached number three. "It's a Fine Day" was also a top-20 hit in Austria, France, and Germany, as well as on the Eurochart Hot 100, on which it peaked at number 16 in March 1992. The single also peaked within the top 30 in Belgium, Sweden and Switzerland. Outside Europe, "It's a Fine Day" peaked atop the US Billboard Dance Club Play chart, while reaching number 12 on the Billboard Maxi-Singles Sales chart and number 30 on the Billboard Modern Rock Tracks chart. In West Asia, it became a top-10 hit in Israel, peaking at number six on 17 March 1992. In Australia, the single entered the top 60, peaking at number 54.

=== Music video ===
The music video for "It's a Fine Day" was directed by David Betteridge. It first aired in February 1992. The video features Kirsty Hawkshaw with her standout shaved head and bodysuit, performing and dancing against a backdrop of what is supposed to be a fine day.

=== Track listings ===
- 7-inch single
1. "It's a Fine Day" (edit) – 3:40
2. "Evolution Rush" (edit) – 4:21
- 12-inch maxi
1. "It's a Fine Day" (club remix) – 6:45
2. "It's a Fine Day" (club remix) – 6:45
- CD single
1. "It's a Fine Day" (edit) – 3:40
2. "It's a Fine Day" – 5:30
3. "Evolution Rush" – 6:11
4. "It's a Fine Day" (a cappella version) – 3:42

=== Charts ===
==== Weekly charts ====
Chart (1992)	Peak position
Australia (ARIA)	54
Austria (Ö3 Austria Top 40)	14
Belgium (Ultratop 50 Flanders)	24
Europe (Eurochart Hot 100)	16
Finland (Suomen virallinen lista)	10
France (SNEP)	14
Germany (GfK)	18
Greece (IFPI)	1
Ireland (IRMA)	6
Israel (Israeli Singles Chart)	6
Italy (Musica e dischi)	9
Netherlands (Dutch Top 40 Tipparade)	4
Netherlands (Single Top 100)	51
Spain (AFYVE)	2
Sweden (Sverigetopplistan)	22
Switzerland (Schweizer Hitparade)	24
UK Singles (Official Charts)	5
UK Airplay (Music Week)	6
UK Dance (Music Week)	3
UK Club Chart (Music Week)	2
US Dance Club Play (Billboard)	1
US Maxi-Singles Sales (Billboard)	12
US Modern Rock Tracks (Billboard)	30

==== Year-end charts ====
Chart (1992)	Position
Germany (Media Control)	90
UK Singles (OCC)	60
UK Club Chart (Music Week)	47
US Dance Club Play (Billboard)	15

=== Release history ===
Region	Date	Format(s)	Label(s)	Ref.
United Kingdom	10 February 1992	7-inch vinyl; 12-inch vinyl; CD; cassette	PWL International	
Australia	6 April 1992	12-inch vinyl; CD; cassette	PWL International	
Japan	25 September 1992	Mini-CD	WEA Music K.K.; 380	
Japan	25 May 1993	Maxi-CD	WEA Music K.K.; 380	

== Miss Jane version ==
"It's a Fine Day"
- US CD single

Single by Miss Jane
- B-side: "Angel's Song"
- Released: 16 November 1998
- Length: 4:18
- Label: Hitland
- Songwriter: Edward Barton
- Producers: Dave Carlotti; Arthur Pellegrini; Carmine Sorrentino

Miss Jane singles chronology
"It's a Fine Day" (1998)	"LaLaLà" (2000)

In 1998, producers Arthur Pellegrini, Carmine Sorrentino, and Dave Carlotti released a remix of the song on the Italian Hitland label. Generally credited to "Miss Jane", the remix utilizes the original 1983 vocals by Jane from the original song with a structure more similar to the 1992 Opus III cover of the song.

=== Background and release ===
The single's initial release was credited to "Carmine Sorrentino & Dave Carlotti vs Miss Jane" and titled "It's A Fine Day '98", while later releases were simply credited to "Miss Jane" with a simplified song title. Several further remixes followed, and the single was mainly promoted with a remix by producer ATB. A music video was produced for the song and the single release was promoted with several performances, utilizing performer Omie Jaffe (also known as Luisa Gard) lip-syncing to the song.

The "Miss Jane" project was further developed with a follow-up single, "LaLaLà", in 2000; this was a new composition with new vocals and lyrics.

=== Chart performance ===
The single was released in the United Kingdom and United States in 1999. Supported by remixes by Jason Nevins, Jonathan Peters, and Eddie Baez, it peaked at number 3 on the Billboard Dance Club Play chart and at 14 on the Maxi-Singles Sales chart. In the United Kingdom, it peaked at number 12 on the UK Dance Singles chart by Music Week and at 63 on the UK Singles chart. In Canada, it peaked at number 10 on the RPM Dance charts. The single performed moderately in Germany and the Netherlands, peaking at numbers 42 and 35 respectively.

=== Track listings ===
- Italian 12-inch single (first issue)
1. "It's a Fine Day" (radio edit) – 4:18
2. "It's a Fine Day" (Pelle mix) – 5:10
3. "It's a Fine Day" (Clubby mix) – 4:35
4. "Angel's Song" – 3:56
- Italian 12-inch single (second issue) and CD single
1. "It's a Fine Day" (ATB Club remix) – 6:12
2. "It's a Fine Day" (ATB radio edit) – 3:31
3. "It's a Fine Day" (Original Clubby mix) – 4:35
4. "It's a Fine Day" (C.J. Stone's Pleasure remix) – 6:25
5. "Angel's Song (Original mix)" – 3:56
- US CD single
1. "It's a Fine Day" (ATB radio edit) – 3:33
2. "It's a Fine Day" (ATB club mix) – 5:14
3. "It's a Fine Day" (The Factory mix) – 7:39
4. "It's a Fine Day" (Jason Nevins N.Y. club mix) – 6:54
5. "It's a Fine Day" (Eddie Baez Exit mix) – 8:15
6. "It's a Fine Day" (Baez Padapella) – 1:49
- UK CD single
1. "It's a Fine Day" (ATB radio edit) – 3:31
2. "It's a Fine Day" (ATB club mix) – 6:12
3. "It's a Fine Day" (Ruff Driverz remix) – 6:41

=== Charts ===
Chart (1998–2000)	Peak position
Canada Dance (RPM)	10
Germany (GfK)	42
Netherlands (Dutch Top 40)	34
Netherlands (Single Top 100)	35
UK Singles (Official Charts)	62
UK Dance (Official Charts)	14
UK Dance (Music Week)	12
US Dance Club Play (Billboard)	3
US Maxi-Singles Sales (Billboard)	14

== Other versions ==
A Cantonese-language version of the song, "Can lalalalali at night only," was recorded by Yolinda Yan in 1992. Other versions have been released by Dallas Superstars, Barcode Brothers, Erlend Øye, and Billie Marten.

The Opus III version was sampled in Orbital's 1993 track, "Halcyon + On + On", on their second eponymous album. A music video for the song features Hawkshaw, the vocalist in the song's sample. Far East Movement sampled the song for their single "I Party" from their 2009 album Animal. Avey Tare sampled the song's vocals on "Oliver Twist", a song from his 2010 album Down There. German house producer Keanu Silva sampled the song on the track "Fine Day" in July 2018. Skrillex and Boys Noize sampled the song in "Fine Day Anthem" in August 2023.
