= Dominique Atkins =

British singer (born 1970)

- Born: Dominique Claire Atkins; 29 April 1970 (age 56)
- Origin: London, England, United Kingdom
- Occupations: Singer; songwriter
- Years active: 1995–present
- Label: Perfecto

Dominique Atkins (born 29 April 1970) is a British jazz and dance singer from London. She has been a member of such groups as Grace and The Space Brothers, among others. Her hit singles include "Not Over Yet", "Skin On Skin", "If I Could Fly", "Down To Earth", and "I Want To Live". She co-wrote and sang on Tilt's 1999 hit single "Invisible". Atkins also performed concerts in jazz clubs, as well as in China.

== Early life ==
She was born in the Middle East, but raised in South London. Her father's love for classical jazz was a powerful influence in her music. Atkins' father is a jazz trumpet player, and she started to perform as a balladeer with her father in clubs when she was 13. Paul Oakenfold and Steve Osborne were impressed by her singing, and she joined them in the dance group Grace in 1995.

== Musical career ==
In 1997, Atkins decided to stop working with Grace, and returned to solo work as well as collaborating with Tilt. She also was the vocalist in Elevate feat Dominique on "Next Life"; and Mekka's "Diamondback". In 1999, she performed vocals, mixed with those of Patti Low, in Grace's re-release of "Not Over Yet".

Atkins also appeared in Grace music videos as the lead singer and also on cover artwork. She also starred in the BBC One play, Out Of The Blue as Angelique along with Cathy Tyson, Colin Firth and Catherine Zeta-Jones.

Atkins also wrote the song "Turn On The Radio", which was on the album Plethora by Loverush UK! in 2009.

In December 2011, a new track for Grace (including Atkins) was announced as being written on Tilt's official Facebook page.

== Discography ==
- Grace – "Not Over Yet" (1995)
- Grace – "If I Could Fly" (1996)
- Grace – "Down to Earth" (1996)
- Grace – "Skin on Skin" (1996)
- Grace – "Your Not Mine" / "Down To Earth" (1996)
- Grace – If I Could Fly (album) (1996)
- Elevate feat Dominique – "Next Life"
- Eurogroove feat Dominique – "Don't Keep Me Hangin' On"
- Eurogroove – "Scan Me" (Remix)
- Ursula's World – "I Will Be With You"
- Tilt – "Invisible"
- Jon Pleased Wimmin – "Passion"
- Mekka – "Diamondback"
- Virus – "Hypnotize"
- Loverush UK! - "Turn On The Radio" (written by Atkins)
- Tilt ft Dominique Atkins - "Can You Feel It" (2013) (Written by Tilt/Atkins)
- Tilt ft Dominique Atkins - "Falling Again" (2014) (written by Tilt/Atkins)
- Tilt ft Dominique Atkins - "Falling Again" (Hernán Cattáneo Remix) (2014) (written by Tilt/Atkins)
