= Kirsty Hawkshaw =

English vocalist and songwriter (born 1969)

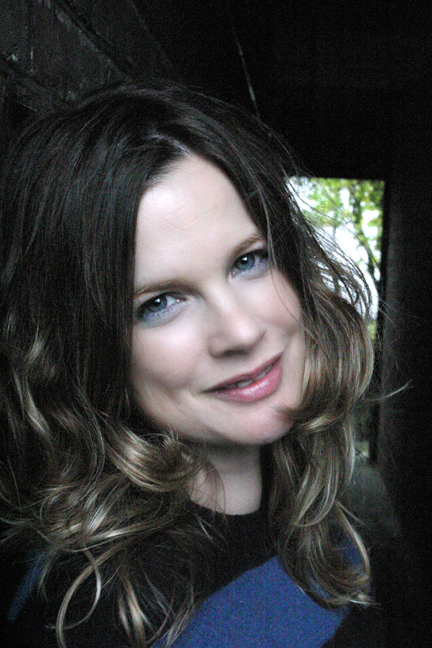
- Hawkshaw in 2005

Background information
- Born: 29 March 1969 (age 57); London, England
- Genres: Electronic; trip hop; house; progressive house; trance; drum and bass; big beat
- Occupations: Singer, songwriter, producer
- Instrument: Vocals
- Years active: 1991–present
- Labels: Coalition/EastWest, Mainline/EMI, Nettwerk, Magnatune
- Website: kirstyhawkshaw.co.uk

Kirsty Hawkshaw (born 29 March 1969) is an English electronic music vocalist and songwriter. In addition to her work as a solo artist, she is known as the lead vocalist of early 1990s dance group Opus III, and her collaborative work with other musicians and producers.

== Career ==
Kirsty Hawkshaw is the daughter of the late British production music/film music composer and disco record producer Alan Hawkshaw, who was known for composing themes for TV programmes such as Grange Hill and Channel 4 game show Countdown. Her mother is German-born Christiane Bieberbach.

At the age of 19, the singer's career in show business was started with the help of famous German producer Frank Farian, who in 1988 released her dance single "Yummy, Yummy, Yummy" on the CBS record label. At that time, she was introduced to the public under the stage name Kirsty Shaw. The single "Yummy, Yummy, Yummy" attracted the attention of promoters of commercial radio stations, and the video of the same name was quite actively rotated on music television channels in a number of European countries. The catchy melody in the Eurodance style became popular among visitors to discos. In addition to 3 versions of the single, the song was also published on several dance music compilations in different countries.

At a rave in 1990, she was noticed by producers Ian Munro, Kevin Dodds and Nigel Walton, who at the time were known as A.S.K. and were signed to MCA Records UK. The trio had released a single called "Dream", when she was invited to appear on stage as their dancer. It was through this meeting that they would form a dance act called Opus III. Their first single, a cover version of the song "It's a Fine Day" from their debut album Mind Fruit, was an international success and Top 10 hit on UK Singles Chart, and reached No. 1 on the US Billboard Hot Dance Music/Club Play chart in 1992. A reversed sample of Hawkshaw's singing from this track was used in the Orbital track "Halcyon", the music video for which featured Hawkshaw. Opus III also had another US number 1 hit on the same chart in 1994 with "When You Made the Mountain", from their second and final album, Guru Mother.

In a 2009 interview, she recalled her decision to end her association with Opus III, saying she felt that she did not want to be part of a "commercialized" act, wanted to go in a different direction, and felt that she did not have sufficient input in writing and production, which led to conflict with the rest of the band; she has also ruled out any plans for a reunion if it ever happens. She has also been critical of the dance music industry more broadly, especially performers lip synching other people's songs, and using original artists' vocals without permission or credit.

After the group broke up in 1994, Hawkshaw pursued a solo career and has since been in demand by other acts in the dance, house, Eurodance, trance, and electronica community, including Tiësto, Delerium, BT, Fragma, Seba, Blu Mar Ten and Paradox, among others.

Her solo single "Fine Day" peaked at number 62 in the UK Singles Chart in November 2002.

Hawkshaw contributed a track titled "Telephone Song" to the children's compilation album For the Kids Too!, released in 2004.

On 10 October 2005, she released Meta-Message, a collection of older and newer songs, after a growing interest in her out-of-print album, O.U.T.

The record label Magnatune released her ambient album, The Ice Castle, in 2008.

== Personal life ==
Hawkshaw is married to record producer Adam F.

== Collaborations ==
=== 1990s ===
Year	Track	Album	Collaborated with	Notes
1992	It's A Fine Day / I Talk To The Wind	Mind Fruit	Opus III	
1994	Guru Mother	When You Made The Mountain	Opus III	
1994	The Belle Of Atlantis / Awaken Kundalini / Flying Spirals	Orgship	Solar Quest	
1995	Kirsty Cried		Solar Quest Vs. Choci	
1995	Olé, Olé	Valencia	Rachid Taha	
1997		Isolation EP	Pulusha	
1998	State Of Grace		Swayzak	
1999	Dreaming	Movement In Still Life	BT	UK No. 38
1999	Online		Warm & Viv Grant	
1999	Stereo		Stereo People	
1999	Where The Sidewalk Ends	To Come...	Silent Poets	

=== 2000s ===
Year	Track	Album	Collaborated with	Notes
2000	Hidden Agenda		Sandor Caron	
2000	Inner Sanctum / Nature's Kingdom	Poem	Delerium	
2000	Running Down The Way Up		BT & Hybrid	
2000	Visions	Since Then	Ian Pooley	
2001	Battleship Grey	In My Memory	Tiësto	
2001	It's In The Music		Warm	
2001	Stealth		Way Out West	UK No. 67
2001	Urban Train		Tiësto	UK No. 22
2002	Killing Me / Whisper	Nommo	Slovo	
2002	Sertão Blues		Slovo	
2002	Kaleidoscopic Sounds	EP Underwater Lady	Harmonic 33	
2003	Calling You	Ikon	Ikon	
2003	Blackout	Morning Sci-Fi	Hybrid	
2003		Science Of Life	Dave Hewson & Derek Austin	
2004	Don't Sleep Tonight	Rubicon	Clashing Egos	
2004	Just Be		Tiësto	UK No. 43
2004	Sincere For You		Lange	
2004		The Centre Cannot Hold EP	Digitonal	
2004	Walking On Clouds		Tiësto	
2005	All I Want		Hybrid	
2005	Halcyon And On And On (Live)		Orbital	
2005	Reach For Me		Jamie Cullum & Steve Isles	
2005	Split		Mr. Sam	
2005	Love Is A Rose	The Five Angels	Pentatonik - Simeon Bowring	
2005	Faith In Me	Zero Gold	Pole Folder	
2006	View To Me	Audio Damage	Future Funk Squad	
2006	Don't Look Behind You		Judie Tzuke	
2006	Just For Today	I Choose Noise	Hybrid	
2006	Insight / Lodestar / Split	Lyteo	Mr. Sam	
2006	Fleeting Instant	Nuages Du Monde	Delerium	
2006	Outsiders		Tenishia	
2006		Pure Pop	Warren Bennett, Mark O'Grady, Mike Sampey, Robert De Fresnes	
2006	Radio Waves		Fragma	
2006	Silent Stars		Pole Folder	
2006	The Chauffeur	The Dawnseeker	Sleepthief	
2006	The Last One And The First		Pentatonik - Simeon Bowring	
2007	Beatitude		Duderstadt	
2007	Heaven Sent		Andrew Bennett	
2007	Skimming Stones	Labyrinthine Heart	Sleepthief	
2007	Loverush		Loverush UK!	
2007	Reasons To Forgive		Tenishia	
2007	Time Is Running Out		Ikon	
2007	Star·Kindler / The Phoenix Effect	Voyage To Isis	Delta-S	
2007	You Will Feel Love Again		OpenCloud	
2008	Fine Day 2008		Kirsty Hawkshaw vs. Kinky Roland	
2008	Good To Be Alive (Healing Angel)		Kirsty Hawkshaw vs. Kinky Roland	
2008	Invisible		Tenishia	
2008	Invisible Walls		Nektarios & Jan Johnston, as Nektarios meets F-used	
2008	Juneau / Glaciation		Alaska	
2008	Love Calls		Headstrong	
2008	Love Is No Possession		JJoy	
2008	Love Like Blood / Sunbathing		Outrage & Aperture	
2008	Time Stand Still		OpenCloud	
2009	Devotion		Seba	
2009	Face To Face		Kirsty Hawkshaw vs. Elucidate	
2009	Fearless Soul (Hybrid Mix)		Harry Gregson-Williams & Hybrid	
2009	Out Of Reach		Hue Jah Fink	

=== 2010s ===
Year	Track	Album	Collaborated with	Notes
2010	A Million Stars		BT	
2010	One Day	Pop Model	Mr. Sam	
2010	The Joy (Face To Face)		Seba	
2010	Amzinai / Sundog	The Mesozoic Era	Alaska	
2010	After The Rain / Meteors / Dreaming Of Now	Two Trees EP	Ulrich Schnauss	
2011	Back In Time		Liquid Kaos	
2011	Clocks (Dandelions)		The Felt Dolls	
2011	Falling (Chillout)		Tenishia	
2011	Let Us Think		Secret Society & Outrage	
2011	The Light		Seba & Paradox	
2011	Whisper		Blu Mar Ten	
2012	Connected		John B	
2012	Dawn		Nektarios	
2013	4K		Lii	
2013	Clear Rain		Rasmus Faber	
2013	Let It Go		Tobias Zaldua	
2013	Nostra Terra (Can We Turn It Around)		One Vision	
2013	Nothing Can Replace		Seba	
2016	Motion		Eshericks	
2018	The Sandshaper / The Wood Beyond The Wall	Mortal Longing	Sleepthief	
2019	Smoke		Trance Arts & Jan Johnston	
2019	It's A Fine Day		2K19	

=== 2020s ===
Year	Track	Album	Collaborated with	Notes
2020	Ghost Town		Dr Rod Octopus	
2020	Love Is All We Need		Öona Dahl	
2021	Serenity	Morph	Öona Dahl	
2022	Hourglass		Accuface X Kirsty Hawkshaw X Trance Arts	
2022	Love Is A Frequency		Zed Minus, feat. Adam Fenton	
