= Edward Barton (musician) =

British musician, poet and artist (born 1958)

Edward Barton (born October 3, 1958) is an English poet, artist and musician from Manchester, known for his eccentric stage performances and use of home-made instruments. He has had top 30 success as a songwriter with hits including "It's a Fine Day" (Opus III) - the tune of which was then used in Kylie Minogue's hit "Confide in Me" - "Halcyon" (Orbital) and "Happiness" (Pizzaman). He also wrote a trio of hits for Lost Witness - "Happiness Happening", "Red Sun Rising" and "7 Colours".

== Biography ==
He grew up in Libya, the son of a Royal Navy officer, before attending boarding school in Britain. He moved to Manchester in the mid-1970s where he lived in the Hulme Crescents estate and studied History of Art at Manchester University. He was signed by Cherry Red Records in 1982.

He is probably best known for composing the song "It's a Fine Day", originally released on Cherry Red as an a cappella single by Jane – his friend Jane Lancaster –in 1983, and later to become a UK chart hit when Opus III covered it in 1992, reaching number 5, whilst also topping the US dance chart. Under the name Owain Barton, he was later credited with co-writing Kylie Minogue's 1994 hit "Confide in Me", which included musical content taken from "It's a Fine Day". Barton later said "I woke up one afternoon and switched on the radio. I thought, "that's a good tune. In fact that's my tune.""

"It's a Fine Day" was followed by the self-titled mini-album Jane & Barton, and another single, "I Want to Be with You". The album featured Andy Connell of A Certain Ratio on piano. Another Jane single, "Lovely and Chicken", was later released through Barton's own label Wooden Records. More releases on Wooden followed, including a 1989 LP called Edward Not Edward which featured covers of Barton songs by diverse Manchester artists like Inspiral Carpets, 808 State, Ruthless Rap Assassins, Dub Sex, Ted Chippington (from Stoke-On Trent via Birmingham), Kiss AMC, Louis Phillipe and A Guy Called Gerald. Barton also released the single "Me and My Mini" / "I've Got No Chicken But I've Got Five Wooden Chairs".

Barton was a regular fixture of the 1980s music and arts scene in Manchester, supporting bands such as Stump, and having his own gallery, Oblong, in Afflecks Palace. He has also contributed lyrics to albums by 808 State and Lost Witness. He branched out into music video direction for the initial release of "Sit Down" by James in 1989 in which he also makes a cameo appearance.

His television appearances have included performances on The Tube and Tony Wilson's The Other Side of Midnight. He also appeared on Wogan in the late 1980s playing guitar in Tears for Fears' backing band. His radio appearances have included at least one guest spot on The Mark Radcliffe Show, during which he gave a live rendition of his song "I Slap My Belly".

In the mid-1990s, he released Hush, a series of albums and 12" singles of a cappella songs specifically designed to be used as samples. This resulted in "Happiness", a hit for Norman Cook's pre-Fatboy Slim project, Pizzaman, and "Happiness Happening", "Red Sun Rising" and "7 Colours", a trio of hits by Lost Witness featuring singers Tracey Carmen (who produced much of the Hush material) and Nina Henchion. He would subsequently work on projects with Mark Day of Happy Mondays and Larry Gott from James.

In the 2000s, he ran successful monthly performance nights in Manchester called Misery. He also spent some time in a psychiatric hospital. In 2009, he issued a new album, And A Panda.

His recent band, Edward and the Babymen, included the teenage sons of Graham Massey (808 State), Mike Baker (The Get Together) and DJ Greg Wilson and Tracey Carmen.
