= Opus III (band) =

English electronic music group (1992–1994)

- Also known as: A.S.K.
- Origin: London, England
- Genres: Electronic, progressive house
- Years active: 1992–1994
- Label: PWL International
- Past members: Kirsty Hawkshaw; Kevin Dodds; Ian Munro; Nigel Walton

Opus III were an English electronic music group who had success on the UK Singles and U.S. Dance charts. The group consisted of vocalist Kirsty Hawkshaw and producers/musicians Kevin Dodds, Ian Munro and Nigel Walton. The group members promoted an environmental and feminist message through their lyrics, liner notes and photo and music videos. Their biggest hit was "It's a Fine Day", which reached number five in the United Kingdom in February 1992. The song had previously been recorded by the singer Jane in 1983, with lyrics sourced from a song by poet Edward Barton.

== Career ==
Prior to the forming of Opus III, Dodds, Munro, and Walton, signed with Capitol Records UK under the name A.S.K. The act released their first single “Kiss and Tell,” in 1988. Afterwards, the trio signed with MCA Records UK, where they released their next single, "Dream," in 1990, peaking at number 85 on the UK singles chart. The group later released a third single, “Freedom We Cry,” in 1991.

It was during the autumn of 1990 at a Spiral Tribe rave where they noticed a dancer that they would add to the act as their visual dancer and afterwards become their lead singer, Kirsty Hawkshaw. The group would eventually become Opus III in 1992. During their tenure as a group, Hawkshaw was the only member that was visible in the music videos and television performances due to the other three members still being under contract to MCA. Once they were released from the label, the other members remained in the background, with the exception of live concert shows.

Their debut album, Mind Fruit, produced the track "It's a Fine Day", a cover of a 1983 single by Jane, which topped the U.S. Hot Dance Club Play chart in 1992 and reached number five on the UK Singles Chart.

The song, now considered a house music classic, is the basis of Orbital's 1992 track "Halcyon" and its album version "Halcyon + On + On" included in their second eponymous album; the "la la la" section of the "It's a Fine Day" chorus was backmasked and sampled throughout the song. Hawkshaw appeared in the video for "Halcyon" playing a housewife who was "under the influence".

The other single release from Mind Fruit was "I Talk to the Wind", a cover of the 1969 song by King Crimson. This was not a big chart success in the UK, only reaching number 52.

Opus III's second album Guru Mother surfaced in 1994 and produced another U.S. number-one dance song "When You Made the Mountain". A third dance chart entry, "Hand in Hand (Looking for Sweet Inspiration)" hit number 14.

The group disbanded after their second album. Hawkshaw was worried the project was becoming too commercial, which is one of the reasons for the band's separation (she has ruled out a reunion as well). Hawkshaw went on to pursue a solo career, lending her vocals to a number of electronic and dance music artists and tracks into the opening years of the 21st century, including Delerium, Silent Poets, BT, DJ Tiësto and again with Orbital.

== Discography ==
=== Studio albums ===
List of albums, with selected chart positions
Title	Album details	Peak chart positions
Title	Album details	AUS
Mind Fruit	Released: 28 July 1992; Label: PWL International; Format: CD, LP, cassette	173
Guru Mother	Released: 21 June 1994; Label: PWL International; Format: CD, cassette	—

=== Singles ===
Year	Single	Peak chart positions										Album
Year	Single	UK	AUS	AUT	FRA	GER	IRE	ITA	SWE	SWI	US Dance	Album
1992	"It's a Fine Day"	5	54	14	14	18	6	9	22	24	1	Mind Fruit
1992	"I Talk to the Wind"	52	162	—	—	—	—	—	—	—	—	Mind Fruit
1994	"When You Made the Mountain"	75	172	—	—	—	—	—	—	—	1	Guru Mother
1994	"Hand in Hand (Looking for Sweet Inspiration)"	79	—	—	—	—	—	—	—	—	14	Guru Mother
"—" denotes releases that did not chart

== See also ==
- List of number-one dance hits (United States)
- List of artists who reached number one on the US Dance chart
