= Darkhorse =

Studio album by Crazy Town
- Released: November 12, 2002
- Recorded: April–August 2002
- Studio: 7 Bay Studios (Valley Village, California); Sparky Dark Studios (Calabasas, California); 7th House Studios (Hollywood, California)
- Genre: Nu metal; rap rock; alternative rock
- Length: 47:50
- Label: Columbia
- Producer: Howard Benson, Crazy Town

Crazy Town chronology
The Gift of Game (1999)	Darkhorse (2002)	The Brimstone Sluggers (2015)

Singles from Darkhorse
- 1. "Drowning" Released: October 15, 2002; 2. "Hurt You So Bad" Released: March 19, 2003

Professional ratings
Review scores
Source	Rating
AllMusic	2.5/5 stars
Counterculture.co.uk	4/5 stars
Entertainment Weekly	C−
Melodic	1.5/5 stars

Darkhorse is the second studio album by American rap rock band Crazy Town. It was released through Columbia Records/Sony Music on November 12, 2002. The album had two singles, "Drowning", which was a minor hit in several countries, and "Hurt You So Bad", which did not chart. Darkhorse peaked at No. 120 on the US Billboard 200, and No. 164 in the UK, achieving considerably less success than their debut album The Gift of Game. The band was subsequently dropped by Sony/Columbia in 2003, and went on hiatus.

== Production ==
The band initially wanted to record the album in 2001, but were undecided on which producer to choose, wanting to work with either Rick Rubin or Don Gilmore. By the time they settled on Howard Benson, it was already into 2002. The album was recorded and mixed from April to August 2002, with additional work on b-sides and remixes lasting into September 2002.

The album's working title was Nothing Comes from Nowhere, which are lyrics from the song "Decorated." A limited-edition version of Darkhorse came with a bonus DVD which included a making-of-the-album documentary, as well as the music videos for "Drowning," "Butterfly," and "Revolving Door."

=== Guest appearances ===
According to Mazur, Black Eyed Peas' will.i.am was a guest on one of the songs (presumably dropped from the record). Rivers Cuomo of Weezer provided a guitar solo on the song "Hurt You So Bad." Members of Orgy (who had previously collaborated on the song "Black Cloud" from The Gift of Game) also collaborated on the song "Boom Box Gang War," which was recorded during Darkhorse's production and initially reserved for a soundtrack album; it was eventually included on the "Hurt You So Bad" single in 2003. Another b-side, "Deja Vu," (released on singles for both "Drowning" and "Hurt You So Bad") features Jesse McFaddin of Rize. Producer Paul Oakenfold, with whom Binzer had collaborated earlier in 2002 on the single "Starry Eyed Surprise," did a remix of the song "Hurt You So Bad," released on the single. Rap group Dirty Unit (which had previously collaborated on the song "Think Fast" from The Gift of Game) provided vocals on the b-side "Suck on My Gun," which was used on the singles for both "Drowning" and "Hurt You So Bad." Max Sadeghi played the santoor on "Sorry," while the album's producer Howard Benson provided additional keyboards on multiple songs.

== Promotion ==
In late July 2002, the band did a ten-hour promotional photo shoot at six different locations in the desert outside Lancaster, California. The pictures were used in the booklet design for Darkhorse as well as the accompanying singles, in addition to being distributed for press coverage. In August 2002, the band provided a demo version of the song "Battlecry" for exclusive airing on Jay Gordon's D1 Music internet radio station.

On September 24–25, 2002, the band shot the music video for the lead single, "Drowning" with directors Emmett and Brendan Malloy.

The band only toured briefly (under 25 shows) in promotion of the release, starting with a few dates in Europe and the United Kingdom from mid-October to early-November 2002 (though 3 weeks were initially proposed), which Valli described as "a promo tour where we just do interviews, TV shows and a couple of short performances." This was followed by a festival date in Brazil on December 3, 2002, and a festival date in San Diego, California on December 6, 2002. The band later reflected they felt their management and record label had already given up on promoting Darkhorse by the time they returned from Europe, before it was even released. The band held a live chat with their fans on their website on the night of the release date, and later appeared on the Rockline radio show on November 25, 2002. A proper European tour was planned for December 2002 but fell through.

Crazy Town performed headlining shows in the American West Coast spanning January 6–23, 2003, supported by Hotwire. They also played one show in Australia on January 27, 2003, two shows at Magic Rock Out Festival in Japan on February 7–8, 2003, and two dates in Europe (including one at MTV's Winterjam Festival) on March 14–15, 2003.

== Chart and commercial performance and hiatus ==
The lead single, "Drowning," was released on October 15, 2002, and peaked to No. 24 on Billboard's American Modern Rock Tracks and Mainstream Rock Tracks charts, No. 45 on Billboard's German Hits of the World Hot Movers Singles chart, and No. 50 in the UK. Once Darkhorse was released a month later, it entered at and peaked to No. 120 on Billboard's Billboard 200 chart, and No. 164 in the UK. However, it sold fewer than 13,000 units in its first week. Crazy Town stated they were not personally disappointed that the album did not sell as well as their last, The Gift of Game, considering they were moving the band in a new direction, away from the pop success they achieved with their number 1 song "Butterfly." A second and final single, "Hurt You So Bad," featuring a guitar solo by Rivers Cuomo of Weezer, was released in February 2003, but failed to chart. The band had previously mentioned the possibility of releasing "Change" as a single.

In May 2003, the band was dropped by Sony/Columbia. The band later revealed that their record company had been pressuring them for a "Butterfly" follow-up. Although rumors of the band's breakup surfaced due to inactivity, Tyler confirmed in November 2003 that Crazy Town was still together but had gone under hiatus to allow each member to focus on solo endeavors. In February 2004, Tyler addressed the fact that the band would not be re-signing with Columbia Records due to the record company's unwillingness to promote their albums. The band became active again in 2007, and eventually released a third album, The Brimstone Sluggers, in 2015.

== Track listing ==
All tracks are written by Crazy Town.

No.	Title	Length
1.	"Decorated"	3:07
2.	"Hurt You So Bad" (featuring Rivers Cuomo)	3:46
3.	"Drowning"	3:19
4.	"Change"	3:44
5.	"Candy Coated"	4:22
6.	"Waste of My Time"	2:56
7.	"Sorry"	4:15
8.	"Battle Cry"	2:49
9.	"Take It to the Bridge"	3:18
10.	"Skulls and Stars"	4:25
11.	"Beautiful"	3:18
23.	"You're the One"	3:56
32.	"Them Days"	3:11

(Tracks 12 to 22 and 24 to 31 are blank)

== Personnel ==
Crazy Town

- Bret Mazur – co-lead vocals, turntables, samples
- Shifty Shellshock – co-lead vocals
- Kraig Tyler – guitar, backing vocals
- Anthony Valli – guitar
- Doug Miller – bass
- Kyle Hollinger – drums

Additional musicians

- Rivers Cuomo – guitar solo on "Hurt You So Bad"

Production

- Howard Benson – producer, keyboards
- Mike Plotnikoff – recording, digital editing, engineer
- Eric Miller – engineer
- Keith Armstrong – assistant engineer
- Chris Lord-Alge – mixing
- Ted Jensen – mastering at Sterling Sound in New York

== Charts ==
Chart performance for Darkhorse
Chart (2003)	Peak position
Australian Albums (ARIA)	90
French Albums (SNEP)	139
German Albums (Offizielle Top 100)	52
Swiss Albums (Schweizer Hitparade)	90
UK Albums (OCC)	164
UK Rock & Metal Albums (OCC)	17
US Billboard 200	120
