= The Gift of Game =

Studio album by Crazy Town
- Released: November 9, 1999
- Recorded: 1999
- Studio: Westlake (Los Angeles)
- Genres: Nu metal; rap rock; rap metal; alternative metal
- Length: 45:17
- Label: Columbia
- Producer: Josh Abraham

Crazy Town chronology
The Gift of Game (1999)	Darkhorse (2002)

Singles from The Gift of Game
- 1. "Toxic" Released: September 9, 1999; 2. "Darkside" Released: June 10, 2000; 3. "Butterfly" Released: February 20, 2001 (physical release); 4. "Revolving Door" Released: August 14, 2001

The Gift of Game is the debut studio album by the American rap rock band Crazy Town. It was released on November 9, 1999, in the US by Columbia Records. The album yielded the band its biggest hit with "Butterfly" which reached number one on the Billboard Hot 100 on March 24, 2001.

Worldwide the album sold more than 2.5 million units, with more than 1.6 million in the US alone.

== Background ==
As Crazy Town refused to cede their official website to Columbia Records (as per a contract clause), the record label barred the group from advertising it on the album's artwork. The band circumvented the ban by adding a last-minute outro to the album, titled after the website (www.crazytown.com), and in which the URL is repeating multiple times.

The girl licking the lollipop on the cover of the album is a fictional character created by Crazy Town, known as "Little Lolita". Both the album title and the picture of Little Lolita are based on lyrics from the song "Lollipop Porn". The album cover was designed by co-lead singer Shifty Shellshock's father and uncle. A song titled "Lolita" later appeared on Shellshock's solo album Happy Love Sick and her image reappears on Crazy Town's third album The Brimstone Sluggers.

== Composition ==
Musically, The Gift of Game has been described as rap rock, rap metal, nu metal, and alternative metal.

== Reception ==
Professional ratings
Review scores
Source	Rating
AllMusic	3/5 stars
Kerrang!	3/5 stars
NME	3/10
Q	3/5 stars
Sputnikmusic	1.5/5
Wall of Sound	65/100

Steve Huey at AllMusic described the album as "similar to many other rap-inflected alternative metal albums in that it concentrates on sound over structure, creating macho, aggressive grooves with grinding, noisily textured guitars and the underlying feel of squared-off hip-hop beats". Huey argued that despite signs of Limp Bizkit's "juvenile humor", the album "shows promise". April Long of NME criticized the album for its generic guitar riffs, and containing "some of the most Neanderthal lyrics ever written".

About the album's lyrics, Shifty Shellshock said: "We're just having a good time. We're not like political or anything. I can be very sarcastic just like a little punk, we talk a lot of trash. We have some points, like 'learn from your mistakes', 'check yourself', you know, 'don't get taken advantage of'. Real simple things, nothing too overwhelming". In 2025, Rae Lemeshow-Barooshian of Loudwire included the album in her list of "the top 50 nu-metal albums of all time".

== Track listing ==
No.	Title	Writer(s)	Length
1.	"Intro"	Shifty Shellshock, Doug Miller	0:25
2.	"Toxic"	Shellshock, Miller, Bret Mazur	2:48
3.	"Think Fast" (featuring Dirty Unit)	Shellshock, Mazur, Miller, Rust Epique, Torshawn Roland, Percy Washington	3:52
4.	"Darkside"	Shellshock, Mazur	3:52
5.	"Black Cloud" (featuring Jay Gordon)	Shellshock, Mazur, Miller, Epique, Gordon, Bernard Williams	5:02
6.	"Butterfly"	Shellshock, Mazur, Anthony Kiedis, Flea, Chad Smith, John Frusciante	3:36
7.	"Only When I'm Drunk" (Tha Alkaholiks cover)	Tash, J-Ro, E-Swift	2:47
8.	"Hollywood Babylon" (featuring Mad Lion)	Shellshock, Mazur, Mad Lion	4:23
9.	"Face the Music"	Shellshock, Mazur	3:24
10.	"Lollipop Porn"	Shellshock, Mazur, Nicole Lorenzo	3:54
11.	"Revolving Door"	Shellshock, Mazur	3:40
12.	"Players (Only Love You When They're Playing)" (featuring Jenny Sipprelle)	Shellshock, Mazur, Williams, Anthony Valli	4:13
13.	"B-Boy 2000" (featuring KRS-One)	Shellshock, Mazur, KRS-One, Williams, Valli, Miller, Epique	4:27
14.	"Outro www.crazytown.com"		1:19
32.	"Untitled Hidden Track"		0:50

- Tracks 15 to 31 are blank, and are each 5 seconds in length.

== Charts ==
=== Weekly charts ===
Chart (2000–2001)	Peak position
Australian Albums (ARIA)	27
Austrian Albums (Ö3 Austria)	4
Belgian Albums (Ultratop Flanders)	40
Belgian Albums (Ultratop Wallonia)	35
Canadian Albums (Billboard)	7
Danish Albums (Hitlisten)	15
Dutch Albums (Album Top 100)	40
Europe (European Top 100 Albums)	8
Finnish Albums (Suomen virallinen lista)	2
French Albums (SNEP)	133
German Albums (Offizielle Top 100)	6
Hungarian Albums (MAHASZ)	3
Irish Albums (IRMA)	42
New Zealand Albums (RMNZ)	10
Norwegian Albums (VG-lista)	3
Swedish Albums (Sverigetopplistan)	20
Swiss Albums (Schweizer Hitparade)	11
UK Albums (Official Charts)	15
US Billboard 200	9
US Heatseekers Albums (Billboard)	1

=== Year-end charts ===
Chart (2001)	Position
Austrian Albums (Ö3 Austria)	40
Canadian Albums (Nielsen SoundScan)	88
European Albums (European Top 100 Albums)	81
German Albums (Offizielle Top 100)	31
Swiss Albums (Schweizer Hitparade)	67
US Billboard 200	63

== Certifications ==
Region	Certification	Certified units/sales
Australia (ARIA)	Gold	35,000^{^}
Canada (Music Canada)	Platinum	100,000^{^}
Finland (Musiikkituottajat)	Gold	20,933
Germany (BVMI)	Gold	150,000^{^}
New Zealand (RMNZ)	Gold	7,500^{^}
Norway (IFPI Norway)	Gold	10,000^{‡}
Switzerland (IFPI Switzerland)	Gold	25,000^{^}
United Kingdom (BPI)	Gold	100,000^{*}
United States (RIAA)	Platinum	1,600,000
^{*} Sales figures based on certification alone.^{^} Shipments figures based on certification alone.^{‡} Sales+streaming figures based on certification alone.

== Singles ==
Year	Single	Peak chart positions											
Year	Single	US	US Alt.	US Main.	AUS	NLD	NZL	FIN	GER	SWI	UK	SWE	NOR
1999	"Toxic"	—	—	—	—	—	—	—	—	—	—	—	—
2000	"Darkside"	—	—	—	—	—	—	—	—	—	—	—	—
2000	"Butterfly"	1	1	21	4	8	2	2	1	1	3	2	1
2001	"Revolving Door"	—	—	—	76	71	—	19	26	43	23	46	—
"—" denotes a single that didn't chart

== Personnel ==
Crazy Town

- Epic – vocals; keyboards
- Shifty Shellshock – vocals
- Rust Epique – guitars
- Anthony Valli – guitars
- Doug Miller – bass
- DJ AM – turntables
- James Bradley Jr. – drums

Additional personnel

- Troy Van Leeuwen – guitars on "Darkside"
- Jay Gordon – keyboards on "Darkside", refrain in "Black Cloud"
- Stephen Costantino – guitars on "Revolving Door" and "Hollywood Babylon"
- KRS-One
