= Monet Mazur =

American film and television actress (born 1976)

- Born: Monet Happy Mazur; April 17, 1976 (age 50); Los Angeles, California, U.S.
- Occupation: Actress
- Years active: 1993–present
- Spouse: Alex De Rakoff (m. 2005; div. 2018)
- Children: 2
- Father: Ruby Mazur

Monet Happy Mazur (born April 17, 1976) is an American actress. She is best known as Laura Fine-Baker on The CW show All American. She was born and raised in Los Angeles and she started acting as a teenager. Monet is also a professional model. She has worked in the acting and modelling industry for over 30 years.

== Life ==
Mazur was born in Los Angeles, California, the daughter of Ruby Mazur, an illustrator known for creating the "tongue" logo for the Rolling Stones' "Tumbling Dice" single jacket, and a former model. Mazur is the oldest of four siblings and the only daughter – their given names were taken from the surnames of famous artists (Monet, a brother named for Matisse, and twin brothers named for Cézanne and Miro). Mazur is of Jewish ancestry on her father's side. Mazur's cousin is Epic Mazur of the band Crazy Town, in which she appeared in the music video to their song "Revolving Door" alongside Kimberly Stewart.

In April 2005, Mazur married British film director Alex de Rakoff. They have two sons, born in 2005 and 2011. In July 2018, the couple filed for divorce.

== Career ==
Mazur began modeling and acting in her teens. One of her most well-known ad campaigns is the three TV commercials for Gap she did with director Adam Daelay in 1999: "Everybody in Cords", "Everybody in Leather" and "Everybody in Vests", in which she sings. She has appeared in a number of widely released films in the past several years, including Torque, Dead Man Running, Monster-in-Law, Stoned, and Just Married. She has also appeared in several television series, including Castle, CSI: Miami, Cold Case, Strange World, Chuck, and Rizzoli & Isles.

Early in the first (2009) season of the television series NCIS: Los Angeles, Mazur appeared in a single episode as a Secret Service agent who is enamored with Chris O'Donnell's lead character. While the role was potentially to be recurring, Mazur's character did not reappear on the series. She appeared in three episodes, over the first three seasons of Castle as Gina, the publisher and second ex-wife of character Richard Castle.

Since 2018, she has played Laura Baker in The CW drama series, All American, which was renewed for a sixth season in January 2023, and renewed for a seventh season in June 2024.

== Philanthropic activities ==
Mazur serves on the board of Watts Community Core, a nonprofit organization that provides mentorship for at-risk youth in the Nickerson Gardens housing project in Los Angeles.

== Filmography ==
=== Films ===
Year	Title	Role	Notes
1993	Addams Family Values	Flirting Woman	
1995	Raging Angels	Lila	
1997	Austin Powers: International Man of Mystery	Mod Girl	
1998	Welcome to Hollywood	Girlfriend at Audition	
1999	The Mod Squad	Howard's Girlfriend - Sally	
1999	Mystery Men	Becky Beaner	
2001	Blow	Maria	
2001	Angel Eyes	Kathy Pogue	
2001	The Learning Curve	Georgia	
2002	40 Days and 40 Nights	Candy	
2002	Stark Raving Mad	Vanessa	
2002	Comic Book Villains	Kiki	Direct-to-video film
2002	Kiss the Bride	Antonia 'Toni' Sposato	
2003	Just Married	Lauren	
2004	Torque	Shane	
2005	Monster-in-Law	Fiona	
2005	In Memory of My Father	Monet	
2005	Stoned	Anita Pallenberg	
2006	Whirlygirl	Whirlygirl	
2007	Live!	Abalone	
2008	The Last International Playboy	Carolina	
2008	The House Bunny	Cassandra	
2009	Dead Man Running	Frankie	

=== Television ===
Year	Title	Role	Notes
1993	Days of Our Lives	Brandee Fields	4 episodes
1995	Kansas	Lindsay	Television film
1995	Party of Five	Erica	Episodes: "Ready or Not", "Falsies"
1999	King of Queens	Julie	Episode: "Train Wreck"
1999	Strange World	Cassandra Tyson	Episode: "Lullaby"
1999	Jack & Jill	Laurie Tindell	Episode: "Not Just a River in Egypt"
2006	Capitol Law	Katja	Unsold TV pilot
2007	CSI: Miami	Lindsay Wade	Episode: "Born to Kill"
2007	Cold Case	Margot Chambers '89	Episode: "Thick as Thieves"
2009	Dark Blue	Liz Franco	Episode: "Ice"
2009	NCIS: Los Angeles	Secret Service Agent Natalie Giordano	Episode: "Keepin' It Real"
2009–2010	Castle	Gina Griffin / Gina Cowell	Episodes: "Flowers for Your Grave", "A Deadly Game", & "Anatomy of a Murder"
2010	CSI: Crime Scene Investigation	Heidi Custer	Episode: "Doctor Who"
2010	The Good Guys	The Cleaner	Episode: "The Whistleblower"
2010	Chuck	Barbara	Episode "Chuck Versus the Leftovers"
2012	Adopting Terror	Fay Hopkins	Television film
2012	Rizzoli & Isles	Georgette Wilkins	Episode: "Money Maker"
2015	Love Is a Four-Letter Word	N/A	Television film
2018–2026	All American	Laura Fine-Baker	Main role (season 1–6), special guest (season 7–8)

=== Other credits ===
- "Revolving Door" (2001 music video), by Crazy Town
- Transformers Universe (2014 video game), as Astraea (voice role)
- Snatch (2017 TV series), as Associate Producer (season 1)
