= Ruby Mazur =

American painter

- Known for: Album art design, painting
- Notable work: Thousands of album covers during the 1970s, including "Tumbling Dice"; Willy Wonka & the Chocolate Factory soundtrack cover
- Occupations: Former art director for Famous Music; Former art director for ABC-Dunhill; Former Paramount director of art
- Children: Monet Mazur, Matisse, Cezanne, Miro
- Website: rubymazurgallery.com

Ruby Mazur is an American artist who has created the cover art of over 3,000 albums for artists including The Rolling Stones, B.B. King, Sarah Vaughn, Elton John and Ray Charles. He is a former art director for Famous Music (1970), ABC-Dunhill (1972), and Paramount Records.

== Early life and education ==
Mazur was born in Brooklyn, New York, and grew up on Long Island. He began drawing at the age of 5. He studied at the Philadelphia College of Art for three years. His nephew is musician Epic Mazur.

== Career ==
In 1995, he hosted an event for Billboard, during which they called him a "world famous artist." Mazur created "thousands" of album covers during the 1970s. These covers included The Rolling Stones' 1972 single, "Tumbling Dice", and albums by B.B. King, Jimmy Buffett, Dave Mason, Dusty Springfield, and Elton John. Mazur also created the cover for the soundtrack to the 1971 film, Willy Wonka & the Chocolate Factory. While at ABC-Dunhill, Mazur received the Art Directors Award for the Illustration West Competition for his cover design for Curtis Mayfield's "His Early Years With The Impressions".

In a 2004 interview with the Las Vegas Sun, Mazur cited the increasingly "formula[ic]" creation of album covers which started during the late 1980s as the reason that he started painting. In the mid 1990s, he created a painting of a model with a cigar in her hand — a suggested addition by a friend — that was purchased by Saudi Arabian Prince Mohammed Al-sudairy before the paint had dried. When compact discs and cassette tapes replaced vinyl, Mazur moved to creating "surrealistic works".

In August 2022, Mazur was planning to open a gallery in Lahaina when the 2023 Hawaii wildfires occurred, destroying the building and 100 of his paintings; the paintings were his "life-long work of 50 years."

=== Tongue and Mouth disputed authorship ===
The authorship of the Rolling Stones' "Tongue and Mouth" logo is a matter of dispute. While The New York Times and others have previously stated that John Pasche created it, period sources have indicated otherwise. New York Daily News, Florida Today, and CNN state it was Mazur who created the logo, while the Ottawa Citizen has listed both Mazur and Andy Warhol as probable creators.

=== Feud with Jagger ===
Since the 1980s, Mazur has been in a feud with Mick Jagger after Jagger allegedly refused to give him trademark rights to the "Tumbling Dice" cover, which he created. He was paid $10,000 by Jagger for the artwork, but says he asked several times for Jagger to give him the rights to the trademarked art. In the 1990s, Mazur attempted to sue Jagger for trademark infringement, but the statute of limitations had passed. It is estimated he could have earned in excess of $100 million from the album art if he possessed the trademark rights.

After the suicide of Jagger's girlfriend L'Wren Scott in 2014, in an interview with Page Six afterwards, Mazur called Jagger a "very bad guy", and stated he succumbed to depression and suicidal ideation when he could not get the trademark to his artwork from Jagger.

"In the late '80s, I was living in New York, going to the clubs and being introduced as the creator of the ‘mouth and tongue’ for the Stones, and then go home to my dumpy apartment. I was balls-off-my-ass broke, having created the most famous logo in the world." - Ruby Mazur

== Personal life ==
Mazur has four children. His daughter Monet is an American actress and model. He moved from Las Vegas, Nevada, to Gilbert, Arizona, in 2006. He currently lives in Maui, Hawaii and is a three-time cancer survivor.
