= Drowning (Crazy Town song) =

Single by Crazy Town

from the album Darkhorse
- Released: October 15, 2002
- Genre: Nu metal
- Length: 3:20
- Label: Columbia
- Songwriter(s): Crazy Town
- Producer(s): Howard Benson

Crazy Town singles chronology
"Revolving Door" (2001)	"Drowning" (2002)	"Hurt You So Bad" (2003)

"Drowning" is the first single from Crazy Town's second album, Darkhorse. The song was written by Crazy Town and peaked to No. 24 on Billboard's American Modern Rock Tracks and Mainstream Rock Tracks charts, No. 45 on Billboard's German Hits of the World Hot Movers Singles chart, and No. 50 in the UK.

== Music video ==
The music video was directed by The Malloys. It features Crazy Town playing in an industrial area intercut with footage showing a story unfold. A young man befriends a girl at a lookout before she is dragged off by an aggressive male. Later the young man sees the girl at a party, and walks off with her alone. As he kisses her on the cheek, the aggressive male and his friends approach and beat the man whilst the girl protests. Distraught, the young man returns to the party, where he explains what happened to his friends. His friends get in a car and start searching for the attackers, eventually finding them at a restaurant. The attackers flee, and his friends chase them down one by one and beat them. The video ends with the distressed young man repeatedly punching something. When the camera angle changes it is shown that he has been on his knees punching at the ground; his friends are then seen helping him up.

== Track listing ==
Australia maxi-single

No.	Title	Length
1.	"Drowning" (Album Version)	3:20
2.	"Drowning" (Crazy Town Remix)	3:34
3.	"Drowning" (John O Suicide Mix)	3:48
4.	"Suck on My Gun" (Album Version)	3:35

UK single

No.	Title	Length
1.	"Drowning"
2.	"Deja Vu"

UK maxi-single

No.	Title	Length
1.	"Drowning" (Album Version)	3:19
2.	"Deja Vu" (Album Version)	2:41
3.	"Butterfly" (Album Version)	3:37

UK enhanced single

No.	Title	Length
1.	"Drowning" (Album Version)	3:21
2.	"Drowning" (Crazy Town Remix)	3:34
3.	"Suck on My Gun"	3:34
4.	"Drowning" (Video Version)	3:18

Europe maxi-single

No.	Title	Length
1.	"Drowning" (Album Version)	3:21
2.	"Drowning" (Crazy Town Remix)	3:34
3.	"Revolving Door" (Live Version)	3:36
4.	"Suck on My Gun"	3:35
5.	"Drowning" (Video Version)	3:18

== Charts ==
Chart (2002)	Peak position
Australia (ARIA)	72
Austria (Ö3 Austria Top 40)	45
Germany (GfK)	45
Hungary (Single Top 40)	17
Scotland (OCC)	55
UK Singles (OCC)	50
UK Rock & Metal (OCC)	4
US Alternative Airplay (Billboard)	24
US Mainstream Rock (Billboard)	24
