= Revolving Door (Crazy Town song) =

2001 single by Crazy Town

Single by Crazy Town

from the album The Gift of Game
- Released: March 27, 2001
- Length: 3:44
- Label: Columbia
- Songwriters: Seth Binzer; Bret Mazur
- Producers: Josh Abraham; Bret "Epic" Mazur

Crazy Town singles chronology
| "Butterfly" (2000) | "Revolving Door" (2001) | "Drowning" (2002) |

Music video
- "Revolving Door" on YouTube

"Revolving Door" is a song by American rap rock band Crazy Town. It was released in March 2001 as the fourth and final single from their debut album, The Gift of Game. It was the follow-up single to their worldwide hit Butterfly. While failing to chart in the United States, it did chart in several other countries, reaching No. 19 in Finland and No. 23 in the United Kingdom.

== Reception ==
Christian Genze from AllMusic stated that whilst "Revolving Door" was not a bad song by any means, it too closely resembled their previous single "Butterfly" to be a real standout. Genze stated both songs feature similar soft guitar loops, smooth beats and a relaxed mood, and that neither song was reflective of Crazy Town's album, The Gift of Game, on which the majority of songs are much heavier. Timothy Mark from NME gave the song and the band a negative review, criticising the song's premise and sexist lyrics.

=== Bonus tracks ===
AllMusic also stated that the remix of the single by Jay Gordon was better than the original, especially for repeated listening, but criticised the second bonus track, a live recording of "Butterfly", stating that the extremely monotonous vocals served only to remind people to avoid possible live albums by Crazy Town.

== Music video ==
The music video for the single was directed by Gregory Dark, and was included as a bonus on the single. The video features Crazy Town performing in a mansion with a revolving door at the entrance. Crazy Town members are constantly surrounded by attractive women, including Kimberly Stewart and Monet Mazur, the cousin of the song’s co-writer, band member Epic Mazur. Scenes with celebrities including Tommy Lee and members of the band Incubus were filmed but cut from the final release. Then band member Squirrel said the video would not have worked as well as a "star-studded thing", saying that it was an attempt to "poke fun" at how the world perceived them after the success of Butterfly, concluding that he hoped people "will see this whole thing as a satire, because that's all it is". AllMusic stated that including the clip on the single was appreciated, though gave a negative review of the video itself, describing it as "silly" and stating that listening to Crazy Town was much more pleasant than actually seeing them.

== Track listings ==
Australian maxi-CD single

1. "Revolving Door" (Alternative Radio Mix) – 3:41
2. "Revolving Door" (Astro American Mix) – 3:05
3. "Revolving Door" (Epic Alchemist Mix) – 3:07
4. "Butterfly" (Live Version) – 3:22

European CD single

1. "Revolving Door" (Alternative Radio Mix) – 3:44
2. "Butterfly" (Live Version) – 3:35

European 12-inch single

1A. "Revolving Door" (Astro American Mix) – 3:55
2A. "Revolving Door" (Alternative Radio Mix) – 3:44
1B. "Revolving Door" (Epic Alchemist Mix) – 3:05
2B. "Butterfly" (Live Version) – 3:35

European and UK maxi-CD single

1. "Revolving Door" (Alternative Radio Mix) – 3:44
2. "Revolving Door" (Astro American Mix) – 3:55
3. "Butterfly" (Live Version) – 3:35
4. "Revolving Door" (CD Extra / Video Version) – 3:44

UK cassette single

1. "Revolving Door" (Alternative Radio Mix) – 3:44
2. "Revolving Door" (Epic Alchemist Remix) – 3:05

== Charts ==
| Chart (2001) | Peak position |
|---|---|
| Australia (ARIA) | 76 |
| Austria (Ö3 Austria Top 40) | 29 |
| Belgium (Ultratip Bubbling Under Flanders) | 16 |
| Europe (Eurochart Hot 100) | 47 |
| Finland (Suomen virallinen lista) | 19 |
| Germany (GfK) | 26 |
| Netherlands (Single Top 100) | 71 |
| Poland Airplay (PiF PaF) | 30 |
| Scottish Singles Sales (Official Charts) | 22 |
| Sweden (Sverigetopplistan) | 46 |
| Switzerland (Schweizer Hitparade) | 43 |
| UK Singles (Official Charts) | 23 |

== Release history ==
| Region | Date | Format(s) | Label(s) | Ref. |
|---|---|---|---|---|
| United States | March 27, 2001 | Alternative radio | Columbia | |
| Australia | July 30, 2001 | CD | Columbia | |
| United Kingdom | July 30, 2001 | CD; cassette | Columbia | |
