= The Brimstone Sluggers =

Studio album by Crazy Town
- Released: August 28, 2015
- Recorded: 2014–2015
- Genre: Rap rock; alternative hip hop
- Length: 47:07
- Label: Membran
- Producer: Bret Mazur

Crazy Town chronology
Darkhorse (2002)	The Brimstone Sluggers (2015)	Flirting With Disaster (2024)

Singles from The Brimstone Sluggers
- 1. "Megatron" Released: December 2014; 2. "Backpack" Released: July 2015; 3. "Born to Raise Hell" Released: August 2015; 4. "Come Inside" Released: November 2015

The Brimstone Sluggers is the third and final studio album by American rap rock band Crazy Town. It was released on August 28, 2015 and was Crazy Town's first album in 13 years since Darkhorse in 2002. It is also the last studio album to feature Shifty Shellshock on vocals, before his death in 2024.

According to then Crazy Town member Epic Mazur, the album is a stylistic follow up to their 1999 debut, The Gift of Game. In comparison to Darkhorse, which was more rock oriented, The Brimstone Sluggers focuses more on hip-hop, and features collaborations from rappers Madchild and Bishop Lamont. Former Crazy Town member DJ AM, who died in 2009, is a featured artist on the track "Born to Raise Hell", and No Doubt guitarist Tom Dumont provides guitar and vocals on the track "Ashes".

== Background and promotion ==
Crazy Town disbanded in 2003 shortly after the release of their 2002 album Darkhorse, citing amongst other things, pressure from their record company for a follow-up to their No. 1 hit "Butterfly". They reformed in late 2007, and announced they were working on The Brimstone Sluggers in August 2013. The album's title is a reference to the band name under which Crazy Town founding members Bret Mazur and Shifty Shellshock originally performed.

Crazy Town released teaser clips promoting the album in August 2013. They began touring in Europe in June 2014 to promote the then upcoming album. In December 2014 they released the single "Megatron", which was featured as the new theme song for Impact Wrestling. They released the single "Backpack" in July 2015. The album was released on 28 August 2015 under Membran Records. "Born to Raise Hell" was released as a single in August 2015, and a music video was released in September. To promote the album Crazy Town would perform two concerts in Germany in November 2015, and two in Italy in December.

== Reception ==
Professional ratings
Review scores
Source	Rating
AllMusic	2.5/5 stars
Kerrang!	2/5 stars
Rock Sins	5/10 stars
Sputnikmusic	1/5
Ultimate Guitar Archive	6.3/10 stars

James Christopher Monger from AllMusic gave the album two and a half stars out of five, saying "there's an expected yet refreshing current of self-reflection that permeates much of the album (something that could never have happened in 1999), especially on standout cuts like "A Little More Time," "Backpack," and "Born to Raise Hell." However, 13 years is a long time, and the genre which the band helped spawn has hardly aged into favor." Philip Whitehead from Rock Sins gave the album five out of ten, saying the album was a large improvement over their previous efforts, though adding "there’s still a long way to go before they can rid themselves of their poor reputation. A lot of growing up still needs to be done lyrically, but they’re on the right track." Ultimate Guitar Archive gave the album 6.3 out of 10, criticising the references to deceased celebrities Amy Winehouse, Heath Ledger and Robin Williams, yet concluding "It still has its share of setbacks, but with its initiative to move forward instead of living in the past, "The Brimstone Sluggers" makes a decent case for Crazy Town's return."

== Track listing ==
All tracks are written by Seth Binzer and Bret "Epic" Mazur.

No.	Title	Length
1.	"Come Inside"	3:18
2.	"Light the Way"	3:46
3.	"Born to Raise Hell" (featuring J. Angel and DJ AM)	3:32
4.	"Ashes" (featuring Tom Dumont)	3:40
5.	"Megatron" (featuring Boondock)	3:42
6.	"Backpack" (featuring Bishop Lamont and Fann)	4:15
7.	"A Little More Time" (featuring Koko Laroo)	3:40
8.	"The Keys" (featuring Madchild)	3:36
9.	"Lemonface"	3:49
10.	"Baby You Don't Know" (featuring Fann)	3:10
11.	"My Place"	3:08
12.	"West Coast"	3:41
13.	"Megatron" (alternate version; featuring Boondock)	3:46
Total length:		47:07

Deluxe edition bonus tracks
No.	Title	Length
14.	"Hit That Switch"	3:47
15.	"Ain't No Stopping Us"	3:41
Total length:		54:35

== Personnel ==
Crazy Town

- Epic Mazur – vocals, rapping, turntables, samples, producer
- Shifty Shellshock – vocals, rapping

Additional personnel

- J. Angel – vocals on "Born to Raise Hell"
- Boondock – vocals on "Megatron"
- DJ AM – turntables, samples on "Born to Raise Hell"
- DJ R1CKONE – turntables, samples on "A Little More Time", "My Place" and "Come Inside"
- Tom Dumont – guitars, vocals on "Ashes"
- Fann – vocals on "Backpack" and "Baby You Don't Know"
- Bishop Lamont – vocals on "Backpack"
- Koko Laroo – vocals on "A Little More Time"
- Madchild – vocals on "The Keys"
