= Slide Along Side =

Single by Shifty

from the album Happy Love Sick
- B-side: "Boom Box"; "Love We Once Knew"
- Released: June 1, 2004
- Recorded: 2004
- Genre: Alternative hip hop; pop rock
- Length: 3:48
- Label: Maverick
- Songwriter(s): Shifty Shellshock; Bret "Epic" Mazur
- Producer(s): Shifty Shellshock; The Neptunes

Shifty singles chronology
"Starry Eyed Surprise" (2002)	"Slide Along Side" (2004)	"Turning Me On" (2004)

"Slide Along Side" is a song recorded by Shifty Shellshock. It was released in June 2004 as his debut solo single, from his debut album Happy Love Sick.

== Track listing ==
UK CD #1
No.	Title	Lyrics	Length
1.	"Slide Along Side"	Shifty, TC, Bret Mazur, Kraig Tyler, Doug Miller	3:47
2.	"Boom Box"	Shifty, TC	2:46

UK CD #2
No.	Title	Lyrics	Length
1.	"Slide Along Side"	Shifty, TC, Bret Mazur, Kraig Tyler, Doug Miller	3:47
2.	"Boom Box"	Shifty, TC	2:46
3.	"Love We Once Knew"	Shifty, TC	3:38
4.	"Slide Along Side" (Video)	Shifty, TC, Bret Mazur, Kraig Tyler, Doug Miller	3:48

== Charts ==
Chart performance for "Slide Along Side"
Chart (2004)	Peak position
Australia (ARIA)	48
France (SNEP)	45
Germany (Media Control AG)	63
Italy (FIMI)	11
Netherlands (Single Top 100)	24
Poland (Polish Airplay Charts)	22
Sweden (Sverigetopplistan)	36
Switzerland (Schweizer Hitparade)	42
UK Singles (Official Charts Company)	29
US Pop Airplay (Billboard)	38
