= Willowbee =

- Directed by: George Kenyon
- Written by: George Kenyon
- Starring: Seth Binzer; Amy Smart
- Release date: February 6, 2004
- Running time: 24 minutes
- Country: United States
- Language: English

Willowbee is a 2004 American short film, written and directed by George Kenyon. The film premiered at the Aspen Film Festival on 6 February 2004. It was also featured at the 2005 US Comedy Arts Festival.

== Cast ==
- Seth Binzer - Lead
- Amy Smart - Burglar
