= Pretty Little Ditty =

Instrumental by Red Hot Chili Peppers

from the album Mother's Milk
- Released: August 16, 1989
- Recorded: November 1988 – March 1989
- Genre: Funk rock, alternative rock
- Length: 1:35 (original); 3:07 (2003 remaster)
- Label: EMI America
- Songwriters: Anthony Kiedis; Chad Smith; John Frusciante; Flea
- Producer: Michael Beinhorn

"Pretty Little Ditty" is an instrumental track by the American rock band Red Hot Chili Peppers. It is from their 1989 album Mother's Milk. Recognized as one of the best examples of the eclecticism the band experimented with in this album, the track was written by guitarist John Frusciante and bassist Flea.

It is one of the few tracks on the album not to feature any guitar layering; music journalist Jeff Apter described the song as "a dreamy, sweetly stoned instrumental featured deft picking and strumming from Frusciante, intertwined with blasts of trumpet from Flea".

== Impact and legacy ==
In 1999, part of the second segment of the instrumental track was sampled by rap rock band Crazy Town for their single "Butterfly", featuring additional lyrics by the members of the band. The single sold 6 million copies worldwide. "Butterfly" itself, and the associated musical segment, was sampled by Gayle and featured on Barbie the Album, on the track "Butterflies".

"Pretty Little Ditty" was also sampled on the August 2020 track "Ain't It Different" by British rappers Headie One, AJ Tracey and Stormzy.
