= Pre)Thing =

American rock band

pre)Thing
- Origin: Modesto, California, U.S.
- Genres: Alternative rock
- Years active: 2001–2004
- Labels: V2 Records
- Past members: Rust Epique; Jon Troy Winquist; Dino "Dinolicious" Guerrero

pre)Thing was an American rock band fronted by former Crazy Town member Rust Epique. Signed to V2 Records, the group released one demo and one major-label record, which came out after the lead singer's death in 2004.

== History ==
Rust Epique, former guitarist for Crazy Town, left the group in 2001. After cutting some demos Rust signed with V2 Records in 2002. He then reassembled and re-formed an ensemble called Rustandthesuperheroes. Soon after, they began playing clubs in the Los Angeles area. Due to a trademark conflict with Hanna-Barbera, the band couldn't use a moniker with the phrase "Superheroes" in it, so they used a name that Rust had created years earlier in Modesto. "pre)Thing". At the Dragonfly in January 2003, they were billed under the name of "Daisy Town". An obvious wink and nudge to the LA hipster scene that followed his prior band, Crazy Town. This was the first performance with new bass player Jon Troy Winquist and drummer/producer Adam Hamilton.

V2 mounted a major promotional campaign for pre)Thing's debut album. The recording sessions were led by Matt Sorum of Guns N' Roses and Velvet Revolver and legendary rock producer Andy Johns. The CD's for the album contained a video game for Windows users, a demo on promotional copies of the album and the full game on the final release and is considered to be the first album to include a video game on the disc. There was a Rust Epique action figure, complete with a guitar, that was sent to radio stations. The single, "Faded Love", peaked at No. 38 on the Billboard Mainstream Rock Tracks. However, on March 9, 2004, one month before the scheduled release of the group's debut album, Rust died of a heart attack in his home in Las Vegas.

22nd Century Lifestyle was released on April 6, 2004.

== Members ==
- Rust Epique – vocals, guitar
- JonTroy Winquist – bass
- Dino Guerrero – drums

== Discography ==
- Diary in Music: Garage Days (independent, 2002)
- 22nd Century Lifestyle: Episode// Rustandthesuperheroes Sexdrugsandsoutherncityrock (V2 Records, 2004)
