= Crazy Town =

American rap rock band

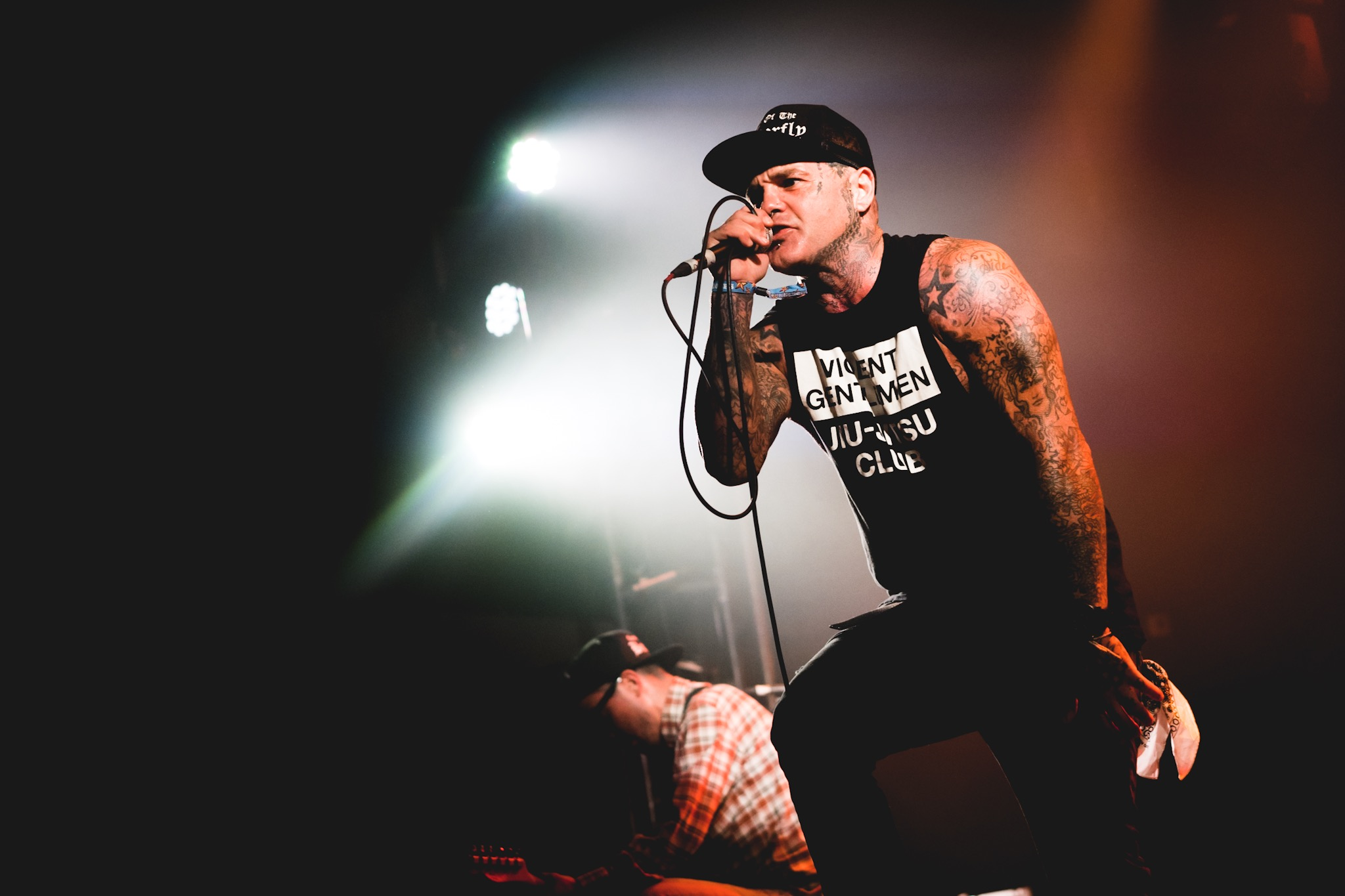
- Crazy Town at Camden Rocks festival in 2018

Background information
- Also known as: CXT; The Brimstone Sluggers (1995–1999); Crazy Town X (2017–2024)
- Origin: Los Angeles, California, U.S.
- Genres: Rap rock; hip-hop; nu metal; rap metal; alternative rock
- Years active: 1995–2003, 2007–2024
- Labels: Columbia; Membrane
- Past members: Shifty Shellshock; Bret Mazur; Adam Bravin; Rust Epique; Adam Goldstein; Omar Gusmao; Hasma Angeleno; Chris Barber; Doug Miller; Antonio Lorenzo Valli; James Bradley Jr.; Kraig Tyler; Kyle Hollinger; Ahmad Alkurabi; Rick Dixon; Elias Tannous; Roland Banks; Bobby Reeves; Richard Robinson

Crazy Town (sometimes abbreviated as CXT) was an American rap rock band formed in Los Angeles in 1995 by Bret "Epic" Mazur and Shifty Shellshock (Seth Brooks Binzer). Their 2000 single "Butterfly", reached number one on the US Billboard Hot 100 chart and helped their debut album, The Gift of Game (1999), sell over 1.6 million units. Their follow-up album, Darkhorse (2002), failed to achieve the same level of success, contributing to the band's breakup in 2003.

Mazur and Binzer reformed the band in 2007 and released their third album, The Brimstone Sluggers, in 2015. In 2017, Mazur left the band, and Binzer changed its name to Crazy Town X. In March 2024, the band released the EP Flirting with Disaster. Binzer died in June 2024, leaving the future of the band unclear.

== History ==
=== Formation (1995–1999) ===
Bret Mazur and Seth Binzer, who go by the names of Epic and Shifty Shellshock, respectively, started collaborating under the name of "The Brimstone Sluggers" in 1995 in Los Angeles, along with Adam Bravin (a.k.a. DJ Adam 12), who preceded DJ AM. However, they did not become serious about releasing any material until much later. By early 1999, Rust Epique, James Bradley Jr. (a.k.a. JBJ), Doug Miller, Adam Goldstein (a.k.a. DJ AM), and Antonio Lorenzo "Trouble" Valli joined the band. Prior to joining the band, Bradley was the drummer for jazz trumpeter Chuck Mangione from 1977 to 1981, and had been a member of the alternative rock band Mary's Danish in the early 1990s. Crazy Town's debut album, The Gift of Game, was released in November 1999, having been recorded earlier that year.

The Crazy Town logo used from the release of The Gift of Game to the release of The Brimstone Sluggers

=== The Gift of Game and "Butterfly" (1999–2001) ===
The release of The Gift of Game was followed by a tour support slot for the Red Hot Chili Peppers. Guitarist Rust Epique left the band while the album was being mixed, and Crazy Town was joined by Kraig Tyler shortly after. The first two singles from The Gift of Game, "Toxic" and "Darkside", were released but failed to chart.

In 2000, Crazy Town was signed to tour with Ozzfest; however, they were forced to withdraw after only two weeks when Binzer was arrested after he threw a chair through a window while he was drunk. Crazy Town then released their third single in 2001, "Butterfly" (which uses samples from Red Hot Chili Peppers' "Pretty Little Ditty"). It reached number 1 on the Billboard Hot 100 chart. Soundscan reports 100,000 album sales of The Gift of Game prior to the release of "Butterfly"; after "Butterfly" reached number 1, sales exceeded 1.5 million.

Crazy Town toured with Ozzfest in 2001. They were received with mixed reviews; many people in the Ozzfest crowd mockingly called them "The Butterfly Boys". A fourth single, "Revolving Door", was released with limited success. In 2001, Crazy Town also made a cameo appearance in the music video for "Bad Boy for Life" by P. Diddy, Black Rob and Mark Curry.

=== Darkhorse (2001–2003) ===
Their second album, Darkhorse, was produced by Howard Benson and released on November 12, 2002. Benson's influence resulted in a more rock-oriented sound. Prior to recording the album, drummer James Bradley Jr. eventually left the band and was replaced by Kyle Hollinger. The album achieved little commercial success, spawning only two singles: "Drowning", which became a minor hit in the U.S., UK, Austria, and Germany, and "Hurt You So Bad", which failed to chart at all. Shortly after the release of Darkhorse the band broke up in 2003, citing, amongst other things, pressure from their record company for a "Butterfly" follow-up.

=== Hiatus (2003–2007) ===
During Crazy Town's hiatus, Bret Mazur went on to form The Pharmacy, a record-producing company. Shortly after leaving Crazy Town, Rust Epique formed a band which would eventually go by the name pre)Thing. He died of a heart attack shortly before their debut album 22nd Century Lifestyle was released in 2004. Binzer contributed vocals to Paul Oakenfold's 2002 single "Starry Eyed Surprise". He released his first solo album in 2004, Happy Love Sick, under his alias Shifty Shellshock. Kraig Tyler joined Eric Powell's industrial band 16Volt.

=== Reformation (2007–2011) ===
In late 2007, Crazy Town announced that the remaining members had reformed and were working on a new studio album, tentatively titled Crazy Town is Back, which would be released sometime in 2008, though no such release was ever made. On August 26, 2009, Crazy Town performed at Les Deux, in Hollywood, California, on stage together for the first time in five years. On August 28, 2009, former member DJ AM was found dead in his apartment, of an accidental drug overdose. On August 7, 2010, Crazy Town played together at the festival SRH FEST 2010 in California. Throughout 2011, Crazy Town released a new song, "My Place", on YouTube, as well as two new songs, "Hard to Get" and "Hit That Switch", on their Myspace page.

=== The Brimstone Sluggers (2013–2017) ===
In 2013, Shifty and Epic said that Crazy Town were in the studio recording a new album, entitled The Brimstone Sluggers. On December 18, 2014, Crazy Town released their first official single from the album, "Megatron". The song was used as the theme song for Impact Wrestling during its run on Destination America in 2015.

The Brimstone Sluggers was released on August 28, 2015. DJ AM appears as a featured artist on the track "Born to Raise Hell", which was released as a single in August 2015. In 2016, lead guitarist Elias Tannous was added to the lineup and from August till October 2016, the band toured with the Make America Rock Again concert, alongside other artists who had success throughout the 2000s. Throughout the tour, Epic would perform and was temporarily replaced by Bobby Reeves, an ex-vocalist of Adema.

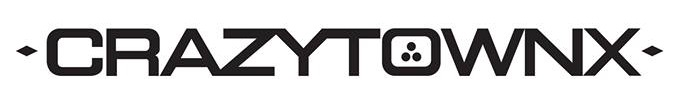
The Crazy Town logo with the X mark on it used since Epic left the band

=== Mazur's departure, lineup change, Crazy Town X and Binzer's death (2017–2024) ===
In January 2017, after a year of hiatus from the band, Epic announced through Facebook that he would no longer tour with the band. Epic intended to still be involved with Crazy Town, though not as a band member. Shifty decided to add an "X" next to the band's name. When asked about the letter's significance on their Instagram account, the band stated "the X is used by gangs to symbolize a territory that has just been won".

On November 3, 2019, Crazy Town's van, carrying Binzer and band members Elias Tannous and Roland Banks, crashed into a moose during a tour stop in Ontario, Canada. All three were treated for bruises and cuts at the hospital.

Crazy Town were kicked off a 2023 tour with Hed PE after Binzer left Bobby Reeves bloodied from a fight outside a venue in Myrtle Beach, South Carolina.

On June 24, 2024, Binzer was found dead in his home from an accidental drug overdose.

== Musical style and legacy ==
Billboard categorized Crazy Town as a rock and hip-hop band. The band described themselves as "hip-hop kids who needed a bit of rock in their sound", instead of a rock band that added hip-hop to their sound, reflecting the band members' background working in Los Angeles hip-hop. The band fused "hip-hop's lyrical attitude and rhythmic sass with the muscle of live rock instrumentation." They developed their rap rock sound in the Los Angeles underground music scene, anticipating nu metal. According to AllMusic, "Crazy Town's music and image reflected one of the most dynamic and volatile sociocultural environments on the planet—Los Angeles—where the urban squalor of the South Central district exists just minutes away from the glitz of Beverly Hills." The band's influences include N.W.A, Cypress Hill, Ice-T and the Cure. Crazy Town's music is defined by "pronged rapping [...] urban angst/street-fighting, bitch-bonking [lyrics]" which are "punctuated [with] bone-crushing [...] guitar riffs." Due to looking more like a hip-hop crew than a metal band, Crazy Town inspired more ire from metal purists than any other rap rock group. It was commonly perceived that the band's target audience was 13-year-old boys "vicariously living out their fantasies of being a bad-ass tattooed pimp" through the band's rap lyrics.

About the band's lyrics, Shifty Shellshock said: "We're just having a good time. We're not like political or anything. I can be very sarcastic, just like a little punk, we talk a lot of trash. We have some points, like 'learn from your mistakes', 'check yourself', you know, 'don't get taken advantage of'. Real simple things, nothing too overwhelming".

Although they were best known for having a rap metal sound, their biggest hit, "Butterfly", had a hip-hop sound. Reporting on the song's success in 2001, The Oklahoman wrote, "The song, which hit No. 1 on the Billboard singles chart last month, was one of those welcome surprises: a deft blend of hip-hop and rock that didn't sound like Red Bull-fueled 'roid rage. Built around a sample of the Red Hot Chili Peppers' 'Pretty Little Ditty,' 'Butterfly' was hard enough to please the Bizkit eaters but smooth enough to seduce pop fans." Their third album, The Brimstone Sluggers, saw the band displaying an alternative hip-hop sound reflective of their musical roots.

In 2013, the band was featured in an NME article titled "28 Nu-Metal Era Bands You Probably Forgot All About".

About the band's legacy in nu metal, I'm Music Magazine said: "Crazy Town is often only thought of as a 'one hit wonder' by way too many people. The band has never truly received the credit that they deserve for their influence on the nu metal scene". Radio.com included the band on a list titled "Top 10 Alt-Rock One-Hit Wonders".

== Awards and nominations ==
Award	Year	Nominee(s)	Category	Result	Ref.
ASCAP Pop Music Awards	2002	"Butterfly"	Most Performed Song	Won	
BMI Pop Awards	2002	"Butterfly"	Award-Winning Song	Won	
Echo Music Prize	2002	Themselves	Best International Alternative	Nominated	
Echo Music Prize	2002	"Butterfly"	Single of the Year	Nominated	
MTV Europe Music Awards	2001	Themselves	Best Rock	Nominated	
MTV Europe Music Awards	2001	"Butterfly"	Best Song	Nominated	
Teen Choice Awards	2001	Themselves	Choice Rock Group	Nominated	
Teen Choice Awards	2001	"Butterfly"	Choice Single	Nominated	
Teen Choice Awards	2001	"Butterfly"	Choice Rock Track	Nominated	

== Members ==
Final lineup

- Seth "Shifty" Binzer – vocals (1995–2024; his death)
- Steven "Epic" Hendricks – guitars (2023–2024)
- DJ Rick One (Rick Dixon) – turntables (2010–2013, 2015–2017, 2018–2024)
- Mark White – guitars (2023–2024)
- Brian "Ruby" Selleck – bass (2023–2024)
- Sean Heenan – drums (2023–2024)

Former members

- Bret "Epic" Mazur – vocals, bass, keyboards, piano, turntables, beatboxing (1995–2017)
- Adam "DJ Adam 12" Bravin – turntables, samples, programming, keyboards (1995–1996)
- Charles "Rust Epique" Lopez – guitars (1999–2000; died 2004)
- Adam "DJ AM" Goldstein – turntables, samples, programming, keyboards (1999–2000, 2001; died 2009)
- Doug "Faydoe Deelay" Miller – bass (1999–2003)
- James "JBJ" Bradley Jr. – drums (1999–2001)
- Antonio Lorenzo "Trouble" Valli – lead guitar (1999–2003)
- Kraig "Squirrel" Tyler – rhythm guitar, backing vocals (2000–2003)
- Kyle Hollinger – drums (2001–2003)
- Ahmad "Deadsie" Alkurabi – guitars (2014–2015)
- Omar Gusmao – guitars (2015–2016)
- Nick "Dax" Diiorio – bass, backing vocals (2014–2017)
- Elias "ET" Tannous – guitars, backing vocals (2016–2023)
- Chris Barber – drums (2017–2019)
- Hasma Angeleno – bass, backing vocals (2017–2022)
- Kevin Kapler – drums (2014–2017)
- Roland Banks – drums, percussion (2017–2022)

Touring/session members

- Boondock – vocals (2016–2017)
- Bobby Reeves – vocals (2016–2023)
- Jarred Jackson – guitar, bass (2022–2023)
- Pigsy - bass, vocals (2020 Aus/NZ Tour)

== Discography ==
=== Studio albums and extended plays ===
List of studio albums and extended plays, with selected chart positions and certifications
Title	Album details	Peak chart positions										Certifications
Title	Album details	US	AUS	AUT	CAN	FRA	GER	NLD	NZ	SWI	UK	Certifications
The Gift of Game	Released: November 9, 1999; Label: Columbia; Formats: CD, CS	9	27	4	7	133	6	40	10	11	15	RIAA: Platinum; ARIA: Gold; BPI: Gold; BVMI: Platinum; IFPI AUT: Platinum; IFPI SWI: Gold; MC: Platinum; RMNZ: Gold
Darkhorse	Released: November 12, 2002; Label: Columbia; Formats: CD, CS	120	90	—	—	139	52	—	—	90	164	
The Brimstone Sluggers	Released: August 28, 2015; Label: Membran; Formats: CD, digital download	—	—	—	—	—	—	—	—	—	—	
Flirting with Disaster EP	Released: March 20, 2024; Label: Krushkill; Formats: CD, digital download	—	—	—	—	—	—	—	—	—	—	
"—" denotes a recording that did not chart or was not released in that territory.

=== Singles ===
List of singles, with selected chart positions and certifications, showing year released and album name
Title	Year	Peak chart positions													Certifications	Album
Title	Year	US	US Alt.	US Main. Rock	AUS	AUT	FIN	GER	NOR	NLD	NZ	SWE	SWI	UK	Certifications	Album
"Toxic"	1999	—	—	—	—	—	—	—	—	—	—	—	—	—		The Gift of Game
"Darkside"	2000	—	—	—	—	—	—	—	—	—	—	—	—	—		The Gift of Game
"Butterfly"	2000	1	1	21	4	1	2	1	1	8	2	2	1	3	RIAA: Gold; ARIA: 2× Platinum; BPI: Platinum; BVMI: Platinum; IFPI AUT: Gold; IFPI SWI: Gold	The Gift of Game
"Revolving Door"	2001	—	—	—	76	29	19	26	—	71	—	46	43	23		The Gift of Game
"Drowning"	2002	—	24	24	72	45	—	45	—	—	—	—	—	50		Darkhorse
"Hurt You So Bad"	2003	—	—	—	—	—	—	—	—	—	—	—	—	—		Darkhorse
"Lemonface"	2013	—	—	—	—	—	—	—	—	—	—	—	—	—		The Brimstone Sluggers
"Megatron"	2014	—	—	—	—	—	—	—	—	—	—	—	—	—		The Brimstone Sluggers
"Backpack"	2015	—	—	—	—	—	—	—	—	—	—	—	—	—		The Brimstone Sluggers
"Born to Raise Hell"	2015	—	—	—	—	—	—	—	—	—	—	—	—	—		The Brimstone Sluggers
"Come Inside"	2016	—	—	—	—	—	—	—	—	—	—	—	—	—		The Brimstone Sluggers
"The Life I Chose" (featuring Hyro the Hero)	2020	—	—	—	—	—	—	—	—	—	—	—	—	—		Non-album singles
"Fly Away" (featuring Tanner Alexander)	2021	—	—	—	—	—	—	—	—	—	—	—	—	—		Non-album singles
"Butterfly 2021" (featuring Ekoh)	2021	—	—	—	—	—	—	—	—	—	—	—	—	—		Non-album singles
"Leeches" (featuring Ray Garrison)	2022	—	—	—	—	—	—	—	—	—	—	—	—	—		Non-album singles
"Faded" (featuring We Are PIGS)	2023	—	—	—	—	—	—	—	—	—	—	—	—	—		Non-album singles
"Lighthouse" (with Silos and Judge & Jury)	2024	—	—	—	—	—	—	—	—	—	—	—	—	—		Non-album singles
"—" denotes a recording that did not chart or was not released in that territory.
