= Adopting Terror =

- DVD cover
- Written by: Nik Frank-Lehrer; Micho Rutare
- Directed by: Micho Rutare
- Starring: Sean Astin; Samaire Armstrong; Monet Mazur
- Country of origin: United States
- Original language: English

Production
- Running time: 89 minutes

Original release
- Release: April 7, 2012

Adopting Terror is a 2012 drama thriller television film directed by Micho Rutare and starring Sean Astin, Samaire Armstrong, and Monet Mazur. It was released on April 7, 2012. Parts of the movie were filmed in Los Angeles, Santa Clarita, and Sun Valley, California.

== Premise ==
Tim and Cheryl are happy when they adopt a little girl named Mona. As they begin to form a family bond with each other, Mona's biological father (Kevin) stalks them. Kevin attempts to take Mona back but is stopped by Tim and Cheryl. As this stalking becomes repetitive, they call the police but they have no answer for them. They are then determined to protect Mona from the terror that Kevin brings to them.

== Cast ==
- Sean Astin as Tim Broadbent
- Samaire Armstrong as Cheryl Broadbent
- Monet Mazur as Fay Hopkins
- Brendan Fehr as Kevin Anderson
- Michael Gross as Dr. Ziegler
- Siena Perez as Mona Anderson - Six-months-old
- Bella Mateko as Mona - Age one
- Gracie Mateko as Mona - Age one
- Shiloh Nelson as Mona - Age two
- Ken Colquitt as Judge Ryan
