= Dead Man Running =

- Dead Man Running theatrical poster
- Directed by: Alex De Rakoff
- Written by: Alex De Rakoff
- Screenplay by: John Luton
- Story by: John Luton
- Produced by: Pikki Fearon
- Starring: Danny Dyer; Tamer Hassan; Curtis "50 Cent" Jackson; Monet Mazur; Brenda Blethyn
- Cinematography: Ali Asad
- Edited by: Alan Strachan
- Music by: Mark Sayfritz
- Distributed by: Revolver Entertainment
- Release date: 30 October 2009
- Running time: 92 minutes
- Country: United Kingdom
- Language: English
- Box office: $735,875

Dead Man Running is a 2009 British crime film directed by Alex De Rakoff, written by De Rakoff and John Luton, and starring Tamer Hassan and Danny Dyer. Football players Ashley Cole and Rio Ferdinand served as executive producers.

== Plot ==
After an increasing number of his clients fail to make good on their payments, Mr Thigo decides to take matters into his own hands, travelling to London to make an example of local bad boy and debtor Nick. Thigo gives Nick just 24 hours to pay back the £100,000 he owes, and, as an incentive, Thigo holds Nick's wheelchair-using mother hostage. Since Nick is already financially challenged, he is forced to be creative in order to come up with the money. At the same time, Thigo sabotages Nick's efforts in order to be sure that he can take revenge on Nick to prove a point to the other debtors.

== Cast ==
- Tamer Hassan as Nick Kane
- Danny Dyer as Bing
- Brenda Blethyn as Mrs. Kane
- Curtis "50 Cent" Jackson as Thigo
- Monet Mazur as Frankie
- Ashley Walters as Fitzroy
- Phil Davis as Johnny Sands
- Blake Ritson as Jarvis
- Bronson Webb as Smudger
- Alan Ford as Sol
- Andrew "Tiny Iron" Harrison as "Brick Wall"
- Omid Djalili as Fat Bald Man

== Release ==
The film was released in the United Kingdom on 30 October 2009. It grossed $681,354 in the UK and $735,875 in total foreign gross. Phase 4 Films released it in the US.

== Reception ==
Rotten Tomatoes, a review aggregator, reports that 14% of 21 surveyed critics gave the film a positive review; the average rating was 4/10. The site's consensus reads: "Poor performances, stiff dialogue, flat characters, and an unimaginative stab at the mood of the Guy Ritchie crime caper make Dead Man Running into a hooligan tale with little to offer." Kim Newman of Empire rated it 2/5 stars and wrote, "This shaggy dog gangland story feels like a straggler from the batch of forgettable Lock, Stock imitators greenlit a decade ago. It has a quality cast, but we've run round this track too many times, while the script jogs from scene to scene without any surprises." Ellen E. Jones of Total Film rated it 2/5 stars and called it "amiable rubbish". Derek Adams of Time Out London called it "budget-conscious, simplistically plotted and often cringingly performed". Philip French of The Guardian wrote that it is "a little uncertain in tone, but brisk and likely to go down well with the patrons of Albert Square's Queen Vic." Peter Bradshaw, also of The Guardian, rated it 2/5 stars and wrote, "For all the sub-Guy Ritchie cliches, it has its moments" and "is not as bad as it could have been." Robert Hanks of The Independent wrote, "Is there any way of stemming the flow of post-Guy Ritchie cockney crime comedies? Would, say, sticking Danny Dyer's head on a pike somewhere in Bethnal Green be enough of a deterrent?" Derek Elley of Variety wrote that the film "recycles Cockney crimer cliches to moderately entertaining results."
