= Happy Love Sick =

Studio album by Shifty
- Released: July 13, 2004
- Recorded: 2001–2004
- Genre: Alternative rock; rap rock; pop rock; alternative hip hop
- Length: 44:35
- Label: Maverick
- Producer: Shifty Shellshock; Paul Oakenfold; The Neptunes; Pharrell; TC; Tom Dumont; John Dumont; J-Hits

Singles from Shifty
- 1. "Slide Along Side" Released: 2004; 2. "Turning Me On" Released: 2004

Professional ratings
Review scores
Source	Rating
AllMusic	3.5/5 stars
Canal Pop	3/5 stars

Happy Love Sick is the only solo studio album by Shifty Shellshock who was best known as frontman of rap rock band Crazy Town. The album includes the original singles "Slide Along Side" and "Turning Me On". The single "Starry Eyed Surprise", a collaboration between Paul Oakenfold and Shellshock that was originally released in 2002 on Oakenfold's album Bunkka, also appears on this CD.

== Musical style and reception ==
Regarding his new direction on the album, Shellshock stated to the Los Angeles Times in 2004 "I tried to remove the heavy rock element [of Crazy Town]. This is more surfer hip-hop: hip-hop with reggae overtones, some dance music and R&B influences." Tim Sendra of AllMusic ranked the album 3.5 stars out of 5 and wrote in his review that while Happy Love Sick was marred by a somewhat repetitive series of songs, it was nonetheless "a surprisingly good album that should be a feature at late-summer slow drags, beach bonfires, and freshman mixers."

== Track listing ==
All tracks are written by Shifty Shellshock, with additional co-writers listed below.

No.	Title	Co-writer(s)	Length
1.	"Special"		3:05
2.	"Ez Cuz You're Beautiful"	Minnie Riperton, Richard Rudolph	3:12
3.	"Slide Along Side"	TC, Kraig Tyler, Doug Miller, Bret "Epic" Mazur	3:48
4.	"Turning Me On"	Paul Oakenfold	4:00
5.	"Lolita"		3:08
6.	"Magical"		3:36
7.	"Shorty Rock"	Ko and the Knockouts	4:13
8.	"Starry Eyed Surprise" (Paul Oakenfold featuring Shifty Shellshock)	Andy Gray, Paul Oakenfold	3:45
9.	"A Better Place"		4:12
10.	"When We Were Young"	Tom Dumont	3:29
11.	"Take Away the Pain"		4:23
12.	"All Along"		3:30

Bonus track
No.	Title	Length
13.	"Turning Me On" (video version)	3:56

== Singles ==
Year	Title	Peak chart positions										
Year	Title	ITA	UK	SWE	SWI	FRA	AUS	NLD	GER	NZ	US Hot 100	US Pop
2002	Starry Eyed Surprise (featured with Paul Oakenfold)	—	6	—	—	—	37	53	—	19	41	13
2004	Slide Along Side	11	29	36	42	45	48	24	63	—	—	38
2004	Turning Me On	—	—	—	—	—	—	—	—	—	—	—
"—" denotes a single that did not chart
