= Alex De Rakoff =

British writer, producer, and director

- Born: 13 November 1970 (age 55); London, England, UK
- Occupations: Director, writer, producer
- Years active: 1999–present
- Notable work: The Calcium Kid (2004); Dead Man Running (2009)
- Spouse: Monet Mazur (m. 2005; div. 2018)
- Children: 2

Alex De Rakoff (born 13 November 1970) is a British writer, producer, and director.

== Personal life ==
In April 2005, he married American actress Monet Mazur. Together, they have two children. As of July 2018, the couple have filed for divorce.

== Films ==
The Calcium Kid is a British comedy film which was released in 2004. The film is presented in the style of a fictional documentary or a "mockumentary". It stars Orlando Bloom as a milkman and amateur boxer. Billie Piper and Michael Peña are also featured. It is produced by Working Title Films.

Dead Man Running is a 2009 British crime film. A loan shark (Curtis '50 Cent' Jackson) gives ex-con Nick (Tamer Hassan) a period of 24 hours in order to pay back the money he owes. Up against it, Nick involves his best mate (Danny Dyer) on a multi-part mission in order to raise the cash before it is too late for them both.

== Filmography ==
=== Films ===
Year	Title	Notes
1999	GTA 2: The Movie	Video short
2004	The Calcium Kid	
2009	Dead Man Running	

=== TV series ===
- Snatch (2017)

=== Video game ===
- Need for Speed: The Run (2011)
- Transformers Universe (2014)

=== Music videos ===
- "If I Was Your Man" by Aswad (1995)
- "The Bomb! (These Sounds Fall into My Mind)" by The Bucketheads (1995)
- "Stayin' Alive" by N-Trance (1995)
- "Boys Don't Cry" by Tekno Mafia (1996)
- "Walk Like a Champion" by Kaliphz (1996)
- "Afrika Jam" by Afrika Islam (1996)
- "Got Myself Together" by The Bucketheads (1996)
- "We Gotta Get out of This Place" by Space (1998)
- "Official Chemical" by Dub Pistols (2001)
- "Sympathy for the Devil" (The Neptunes Remix) by The Rolling Stones (2003)
- "Another White Dash" by Butterfly Boucher (2004)
- "Bubblin'" by Blue (2004)
- "Sand in My Shoes" by Dido (2004)
- "Since U Been Gone" by Kelly Clarkson (2004)
- "High and Dry" by Jamie Cullum (2004)
- "The Other Side" by Alana Grace (2005)
- "Trumpets" by Flipsyde (2006)
- "Gallery" by Mario Vazquez (2006)
- "Will You Be Around" by Platinum Weird (2006)
- "See Right Through Me" by Mobile (2006)
