= Snatch (TV series) =

Crime comedy-drama streaming TV series

- Genre: Crime; Comedy drama
- Created by: Alex De Rakoff
- Based on: Snatch by Guy Ritchie
- Starring: Luke Pasqualino; Rupert Grint; Lucien Laviscount; Phoebe Dynevor; Juliet Aubrey; Marc Warren; Stephanie Leonidas; Tamer Hassan; Dougray Scott
- Countries of origin: United Kingdom; United States
- Original language: English
- No. of seasons: 2
- No. of episodes: 20

Production
- Executive producers: Alex De Rakoff; Rupert Grint
- Producer: Helen Flint
- Camera setup: Single-camera
- Running time: 42–43 minutes
- Production companies: Little Island Productions; Sony Pictures Television

Original release
- Network: Crackle
- Release: March 16, 2017 – September 13, 2018

Snatch is a crime comedy-drama television series based on the film of the same name, and that premiered on March 16, 2017, on Crackle. The series was created by Alex De Rakoff and stars Luke Pasqualino, Rupert Grint, Lucien Laviscount, Phoebe Dynevor, Juliet Aubrey, Marc Warren, Stephanie Leonidas, Tamer Hassan, and Dougray Scott.

== Premise ==
Snatch follows a group of young scammers who find themselves with a truck loaded with stolen gold bullion and are soon involved in the world of organized crime.

== Cast and characters ==
=== Main ===
- Luke Pasqualino as Albert Hill, a Cockney hustler
- Rupert Grint as Charlie Cavendish-Scott, Albert's partner in crime who comes from an aristocratic family
- Lucien Laviscount as Billy 'Fuckin' Ayres, a local half-Irish Traveller boxer and Albert and Charlie's friend
- Phoebe Dynevor as Lotti Mott, Sonny Castillo's moll who desperately wants out and decides to help Albert and Charlie in their scheme
- Juliet Aubrey as Lily Hill, Albert's mother
- Marc Warren as DI Bob Fink (season 1), a corrupt police inspector who operates as a local crime lord
- Stephanie Leonidas as Chloe Koen (season 1), a local gold dealer whom Charlie fancies
- Tamer Hassan as Hate 'Em, Vic's cellmate in prison
- Dougray Scott as Vic Hill, Albert's father, a legendary bank robber who still runs things from inside prison

=== Recurring ===
- Ed Westwick as Sonny Castillo (season 1), a local Cuban crime lord
- Ian Gelder as Norman Gordon, an old friend of Vic's and a safecracker
- Claire Cooper as DI Teri Dwyer, Jones's subordinate in law enforcement and crime
- Vincent Regan as Chief Superintendent Jones, a corrupt policeman
- Johann Myers as Windrush, a cleaner
- David Bamber as Staff, the Cavendish-Scotts' butler
- Duncan Watkinson as Peters
- Nick Pearse as Bert the Friendly Screw, a correctional officer at Vic's prison who does favours for him
- Henry Goodman as Saul Gold, a Jewish local jeweller and crime boss
- Brian McCardie as Uncle Dean (season 1), Billy's uncle, the leader of a campsite of Travellers
- Luke J.I. Smith as Mushy
- Jack Brady as Eddie Flowers, Lily's mute assistant at her flower shop
- Leon Annor as Lil' Manny, Sonny Castillo's right-hand man
- Russ Bain as Lawrence McLeod, a security worker at Fink's police station
- Shaun Mason as Tall Paul
- Marc Bannerman as Patsy Richardson, a London loan shark to whom Albert owes money
- Ray Fearon as Father John (season 1), a London fence and crooked evangelical priest
- Michael Obiora as Nas Stone (season 1), a New York jeweller
- Julian Firth as Lord Cavendish-Scott, Charlie's father
- Adam Levy as Abel Heimel, a Hasidic Jewish gangster from New York affiliated with Saul Gold
- Joe Hurst as Schmeckel Heimel, a Hasidic Jewish gangster from New York affiliated with Saul Gold
- Kevin Sutton as Yuda Heimel, a Hasidic Jewish gangster from New York affiliated with Saul Gold
- Steve Bell as Referee
- Emmett J. Scanlan as King Royston, Billy's late father, an itinerant boxer
- Emma Osman as Beth Ayres, Billy's mother, who was the lead singer in a punk band
- Hovik Keuchkerian as Carlito Blanco
- Ursula Corbero as Inés Santiago (season 2)
- David Lifschitz as Tomás (season 2)

== Episodes ==
=== Series overview ===
Season	Episodes	Originally released
1	10	March 16, 2017
2	10	September 13, 2018

=== Season 1 (2017) ===
No. overall	No. in season	Title	Directed by	Written by	Original release date
1	1	"All That Glitters"	Nick Renton	Story by : Alex De Rakoff & David Harris Kline; Teleplay by : Alex De Rakoff	March 16, 2017
2	2	"Badda Bling"	Nick Renton	Story by : Alex De Rakoff & David Harris Kline; Teleplay by : David Harris Kline	March 16, 2017
3	3	"Going In Heavy"	Nick Renton	Story by : Alex De Rakoff & David Harris Kline; Teleplay by : Alex De Rakoff	March 16, 2017
4	4	"Across The Pond"	Nick Renton	Story by : Alex De Rakoff & David Harris Kline; Teleplay by : Alex De Rakoff & Jason Kaleko	March 16, 2017
5	5	"The Smelt Down"	Lawrence Gough	Story by : Alex De Rakoff & David Harris Kline; Teleplay by : Alex De Rakoff	March 16, 2017
6	6	"Fly Away You Nutters"	Lawrence Gough	Alex De Rakoff & David Harris Kline	March 16, 2017
7	7	"Coming Home To Roost"	Lawrence Gough	Story by : Alex De Rakoff & David Harris Kline; Teleplay by : David Harris Kline & Chris Gorak	March 16, 2017
8	8	"Pear Shaped"	Lawrence Gough	Story by : Alex De Rakoff & David Harris Kline; Teleplay by : Jason Kaleko & Beanie Brownjohn	March 16, 2017
9	9	"Creepers"	Geoffrey Sax	Story by : Alex De Rakoff & David Harris Kline; Teleplay by : David Harris Kline & Simon Spurrier	March 16, 2017
10	10	"A Family Affair"	Geoffrey Sax	Story by : Alex De Rakoff & David Harris Kline; Teleplay by : Alex De Rakoff & Beanie Brownjohn	March 16, 2017

=== Season 2 (2018) ===
No. overall	No. in season	Title	Directed by	Written by	Original release date
11	1	"Ole"	Tom Dey	Alex De Rakoff	September 13, 2018
12	2	"The Catalan and the Mute"	Tom Dey	Alex De Rakoff	September 13, 2018
13	3	"Larga Vida al Rey"	Tom Dey	Grant Levy & Dominik Rothbard	September 13, 2018
14	4	"Haymaker"	Luis Prieto	Michael Cobian	September 13, 2018
15	5	"Good Work for Good Money"	Luis Prieto	Anderson MacKenzie	September 13, 2018
16	6	"Bomba"	Kevin Connolly	Alex De Rakoff & Anderson MacKenzie	September 13, 2018
17	7	"Heavy Wears the Crown"	Kevin Connolly	Alex De Rakoff & Michael Cobian	September 13, 2018
18	8	"Diamonds Ain't Forever"	Kevin Connolly	Alex De Rakoff & Grant Levy & Dominik Rothbard	September 13, 2018
19	9	"Close Quarters"	Luis Prieto	Alex De Rakoff & Grant Levy & Dominik Rothbard	September 13, 2018
20	10	"Job Done"	Luis Prieto	Alex De Rakoff & Anderson MacKenzie	September 13, 2018

== Production ==
=== Development ===
On April 20, 2016, it was announced that Crackle had given a series order to a television series adaptation of Guy Ritchie's 2000 film Snatch for a first season consisting of ten episodes. On August 22, 2016, it was announced that the series was created by Alex De Rakoff who was also set to serve as the show's head writer and an executive producer. It was additionally announced that Helen Flint would act as a producer for the series, Nick Renton would direct, and that production companies involved with the series were expected to include Little Island Productions. Principal photography for season one was expected to commence during the week of August 29, 2016 in Manchester, England.

On April 19, 2017, it was announced that Crackle had renewed the series for a second season. On July 24, 2018, it was announced that season two would premiere on September 13, 2018.

=== Casting ===
In August 2016, it was announced that Rupert Grint, Dougray Scott, Luke Pasqualino, and Lucien Laviscount had been cast in the series' lead roles and that Ed Westwick would appear in a recurring capacity. On September 23, 2016, it was reported that Phoebe Dynevor had been cast in series regular role. On February 7, 2018, it was announced that Úrsula Corberó had been cast in a recurring role for the second season.

== Release ==
On January 13, 2017, the first trailer for the series was released. On August 22, 2018, the official trailer for the second season was released.

On March 9, 2017, the series held its world premiere at the ArcLight Culver City movie theater in Culver City, California. On September 28, 2017, the series held its British premiere at the BT Tower in Fitzrovia, London, England. On October 31, 2017, the series premiered on AMC in the United Kingdom.

== Reception ==
=== Critical response ===
The first season was met with a mixed to negative response from critics upon its debut. On the review aggregation website Rotten Tomatoes, the series holds a 39% approval rating with an average rating of 4.80 out of 10 based on 18 reviews. The website's critical consensus reads, "Snatch won't grab you." Metacritic, which uses a weighted average, assigned the series a score of 55 out of 100 based on 9 critics, indicating "mixed or average reviews".

=== Awards and nominations ===
Year	Award	Category	Nominee(s)	Outcome	Ref.
2018	National Film Awards UK	Best TV Drama Series	Snatch	Nominated	
2018	National Film Awards UK	Best Actor	Rupert Grint	Nominated	
2018	National Film Awards UK	Best Supporting Actor	Lucien Laviscount	Nominated	
2018	National Film Awards UK	Best Breakthrough Performance	Marc Warren	Nominated	
