= Shifty Shellshock =

American singer (1974–2024)

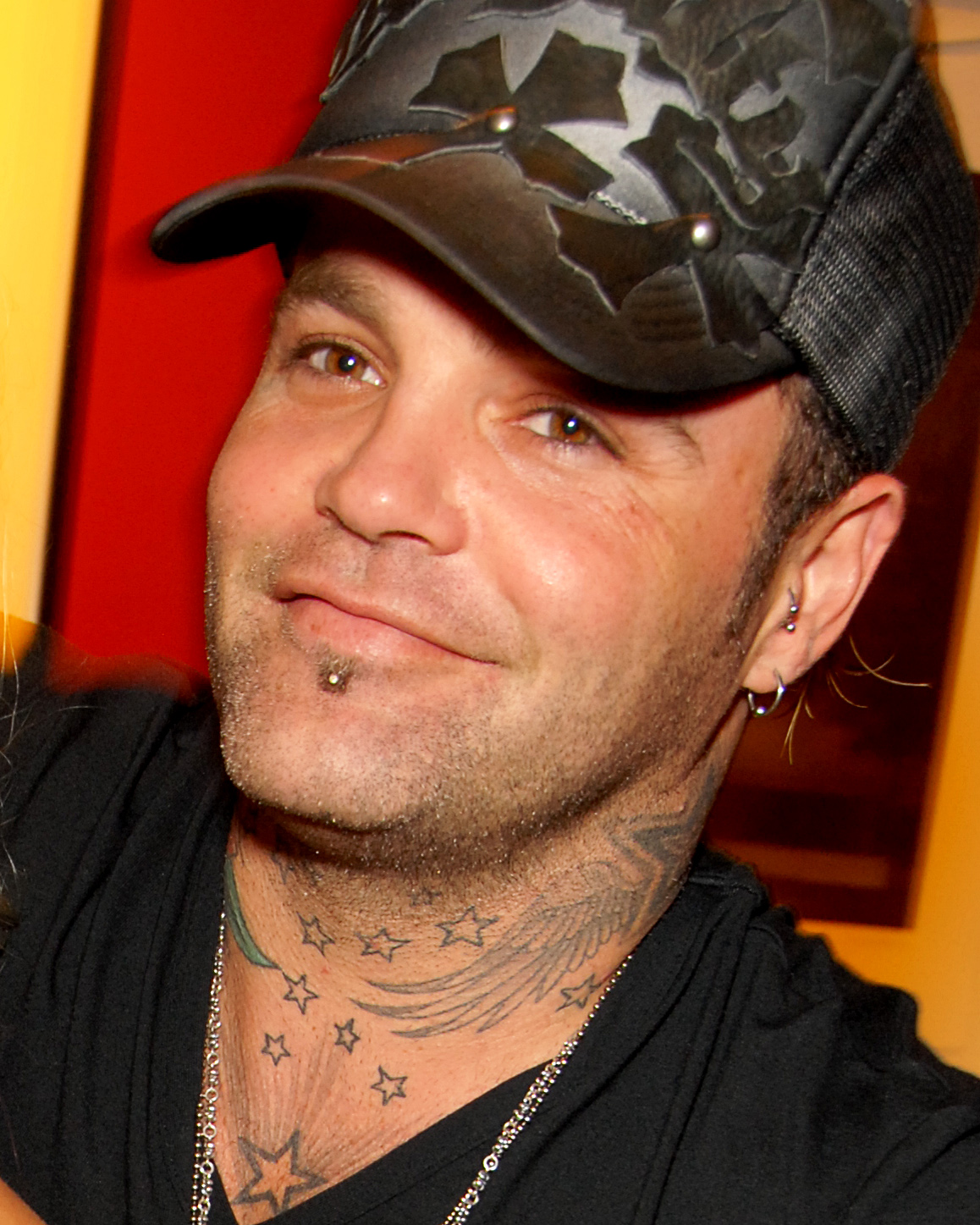
- Binzer in 2009

Background information
- Born: Seth Brooks Binzer; August 23, 1974; Los Angeles, California, U.S.
- Died: June 24, 2024 (aged 49) Los Angeles, California, U.S.
- Genres: Rap rock; alternative rock; nu metal; rap metal
- Occupations: Rapper; singer; songwriter; actor
- Years active: 1992–2024
- Formerly of: Crazy Town

Seth Brooks Binzer (August 23, 1974 – June 24, 2024), better known by his stage name Shifty Shellshock, was an American rapper, singer, songwriter, and actor who cofounded the rap rock band Crazy Town, known for their hit song "Butterfly". He later had a solo career. Binzer struggled with addiction throughout his career and appeared on the reality television series Celebrity Rehab and Sober House.

== Early life ==
Binzer was born in Los Angeles on August 23, 1974; his father, Rollin Binzer (1939-2025), worked as an artist and documentary film director, and his mother, Leslie Brooks, worked as a script proofreader and model. He grew up primarily in Los Angeles with the exception of a brief period in Marblehead, Massachusetts. He began writing rhymes and rap songs by the age of 12.

In a 2001 interview with Rolling Stone, Binzer admitted to spending three months in the California Institution for Men following an attempted burglary, to selling and using recreational drugs over a period of several years, as well as to struggling with drug addiction.

== Music career ==
=== Crazy Town ===
Binzer met fellow Crazy Town frontman Bret Mazur in 1992; they started collaborating under the name The Brimstone Sluggers. By early 1999, they formed the group Crazy Town. In 2000, Crazy Town was signed to tour with Ozzfest. They were kicked out after two weeks when Binzer was arrested for throwing a chair through a window while drunk.

The band's single, "Butterfly", was a global hit. It peaked at the top of the Billboard Hot 100 and in several other countries including Austria, Denmark, and Norway. The success of the single prompted sales of their debut album, The Gift of Game, to exceed 1.5 million.

Their 2002 follow-up album, Darkhorse, was a commercial failure by comparison, and the band broke up shortly after its release.

Crazy Town announced they had re-formed in 2007, and performed live for the first time in five years in August 2009. They released their third album, The Brimstone Sluggers, in 2015.

=== Solo career and the Big Shots ===
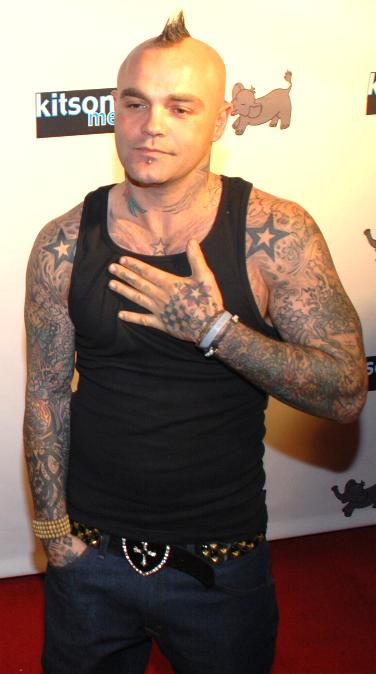
Shellshock in 2007

During Crazy Town's hiatus, Binzer collaborated with British producer and musician Paul Oakenfold, contributing vocals to Oakenfold's hit single "Starry Eyed Surprise". The track was for Oakenfold's first solo studio album Bunkka. In an interview with Rolling Stone magazine in the US, Binzer said that the track was created after the pair met at a Crazy Town show. The song peaked at number 41 on the Billboard Hot 100 and number six on the UK Singles Chart.

Binzer released his only solo album, Happy Love Sick, in 2004. The first single from the album, "Slide Along Side", charted in several European countries, including number 29 on the UK Singles Chart, and number 11 in Italy.

In July 2010, Binzer's new group, Shifty and the Big Shots, released their first single, "Save Me".

== Personal life ==
Binzer married Melissa Clark in 2002. They had a son named Halo. In 2011, Clark filed for divorce, citing irreconcilable differences. Binzer dated Tracy Shelor in 2008. They had a son named Gage.

Binzer began a relationship with British model Jasmine Lennard in 2010. On March 27, 2011, police responded to a report of a domestic disturbance between the pair. Binzer was arrested for outstanding warrants and released later that day. In a video interview with TMZ.com, Binzer stated the disturbance was simply a noise complaint, and that the outstanding warrant was for counter-assaulting a security guard who was using unnecessary force when trying to throw him out of a club. Lennard and Binzer announced their engagement in 2012. Binzer was arrested in February 2012 for battery and cocaine possession, and sentenced to three years' probation; his relationship with Lennard ended shortly thereafter. Binzer and Lennard had a son named Phoenix. In 2013, Lennard asked a California court for exclusive custody of their son, claiming Binzer smoked crack in front of him and once left a crack pipe in his room.

In 2022, Binzer was dating actress Soleil Moon Frye when he was arrested for DUI in Los Angeles.

=== Addiction problems and reality shows ===
Following his struggle with substance abuse, Binzer was one of nine celebrities featured in the first season of VH1's Celebrity Rehab. Binzer graduated from treatment with the other cast members in the summer of 2007. His sobriety was short-lived and subsequently he appeared briefly towards the end of Celebrity Rehab 2, where Dr. Drew and Binzer's sponsor retrieved him from his hotel room where he had been using drugs and brought him to the Pasadena Recovery Center.

Binzer also appeared on a follow-up show titled Celebrity Rehab Presents Sober House. In July 2008, while shooting scenes for the show, Binzer walked out on production and into a heavy relapse after feeling insulted at a club. William Smith, an employee of Dr. Drew, eventually sought out Binzer at a motel and brought him back to the rehab facility. An embarrassed Binzer pledged to Smith and Dr. Drew that the binge he embarked on was his last. On the show's final episode, Binzer is shown in the preliminary stages of being signed to a record producer for a new song, and resolves to stay sober. On the August 30, 2009, episode of Loveline, Dr. Drew gave an emotional eulogy to his good friend and Binzer's former bandmate DJ AM, who had died two days previously from an accidental drug overdose shortly after breaking 11 years of sobriety. During the tribute, Dr. Drew mentioned that Binzer's problems with addiction continued after Sober House 1, eventually leading Binzer to take part in Sober House 2. When filming for Sober House 2 began, Dr. Drew got a "distress call" from Binzer and the two met, with Binzer revealing to Drew that his thirst for drugs was still very much active, and that he needed more help. Dr. Drew reluctantly allowed him to take part in the show and firmly stated that it would be the last time Drew gave him treatment. Dr. Drew voiced his hope that Goldstein's death would inspire Binzer to remain sober.

=== Health problems and death ===
On March 29, 2012, Binzer was admitted to a hospital after losing consciousness. He awakened from the coma and was later released from the hospital.

On June 24, 2024, Binzer died at his home in Los Angeles from an accidental overdose of cocaine, fentanyl, and methamphetamine; he was 49.

== Discography ==
=== Albums ===
Year	Album details
2004	Happy Love Sick: UK release: July 13; US release: September 6; Label: Maverick

=== Singles ===
Year	Title	Peak chart positions											Album
Year	Title	ITA	UK	SWE	SWI	FRA	AUS	NLD	GER	NZ	US	US Top 40	Album
2002	"Starry Eyed Surprise" (Paul Oakenfold featuring Shifty Shellshock)	—	6	—	—	—	37	41	—	19	41	13	Happy Love Sick
2004	"Slide Along Side"	11	29	36	42	45	48	24	63	—	—	38	Happy Love Sick
2004	"Turning Me On"	—	—	—	—	—	—	—	—	—	—	—	Happy Love Sick

As Shifty & the Big Shots

- 2010: "Save Me"
- 2010: "City of Angels"

Others

- 2006: "Greatest Lovers" (Shellshock & Pony Boy)

== Filmography ==
Binzer had a minor role in the 1994 film Clifford, and played the lead role in the 2004 short film Willowbee. He also appeared in the 2016 film Dead 7.

He also appeared in cameos for the music videos "Fly Away" by Lenny Kravitz and "Bad Boy for Life" by Sean Combs.
