= 22nd Century Lifestyle =

Studio album by pre)Thing
- Released: April 6, 2004
- Recorded: 2003
- Genre: Nu metal
- Length: 42:55
- Label: V2
- Producers: Andy Johns, Brian Virtue

Pre)Thing chronology
Diary in Music (Garage Days) (2002)	22nd Century Lifestyle (2004)

Singles from 22nd Century Lifestyle
- 1. "Faded Love" Released: 2004

Professional ratings
Review scores
Source	Rating
AllMusic	2.5/5 stars
Melodic.net	3.5/5 stars

22nd Century Lifestyle (subtitled as: episode//rustandthesuperheroes sexdrugsandsoutherncityrock) is the debut album by American nu metal band pre)Thing. It was released on April 6, 2004, by V2 Records. This is the only pre)Thing album due to the death of the band's lead singer and guitarist, Rust Epique, which only happened a month prior.

The album also doubled as a video game when inserted into a Windows computer, and can be considered one of the first full length albums to feature a video game while the promotional copy contained the demo for the video game.

The album's only single, "Faded Love," managed to chart at No .38 on the US Mainstream Rock Tracks. "Can't Stop (22nd Century Lifestyle)" was also featured prominently in the video games: WWE Day of Reckoning, WWE SmackDown! vs. RAW, and WWE WrestleMania 21.

== Track listing ==
No.	Title	Lyrics	Music	Length
1.	"War"	Epique	Epique, Barakat, Vaughan	4:16
2.	"Assscending"	Epique	Epique	4:51
3.	"Can't Stop (22nd Century Lifestyle)"	Epique	Epique	4:51
4.	"Stay Alive"	Epique	Epique	3:58
5.	"Won + X"	Epique	Epique, Barakat, Vaughan	3:57
6.	"Arizona"	Epique	Epique, Barakat, Vaughan	5:02
7.	"Know...More Words"	Epique, Wilson	Epique, Barakat, Vaughan	5:11
8.	"Faded Love"	Epique	Epique	3:40
9.	"Shoot Shoot (Carl's Song)"	Epique	Epique	2:24
10.	"Sunshine (I Love)"	Epique	Epique, Barakat, Vaughan	6:45

== Personnel ==
- Rust Epique – vocals, guitar
- Bob Vaughan – bass
- Ted Barakat – drums
- Ayo Adeyemi – percussion
- Biff Wilson – background vocals
- Brian Virtue – producer
- Will Blochinger – photographer

== Charts ==
Singles – Billboard (North America)

Year	Single	Chart	Position
2004	"Faded Love"	Mainstream Rock Tracks	38
