= Butterfly (Crazy Town song) =

2000 single by Crazy Town

- Artwork for commercial US and continental European releases

Single by Crazy Town

from the album The Gift of Game
- B-side: "Revolving Door"
- Released: October 24, 2000
- Genre: Hip-hop; rap rock
- Length: 3:36
- Label: Columbia
- Composers: Seth Binzer; Bret Mazur; Anthony Kiedis; Flea; John Frusciante; Chad Smith
- Lyricists: Seth Binzer; Bret Mazur
- Producers: Josh Abraham; Bret Mazur

Crazy Town singles chronology
"Darkside" (2000)	"Butterfly" (2000)	"Revolving Door" (2001)

Music video
- "Butterfly" on YouTube

"Butterfly" is a song by American rap rock band Crazy Town. The song was released in October 2000 as the third single from their debut album, The Gift of Game. It gained mainstream popularity after being released physically on February 19, 2001. It is based on a sample of "Pretty Little Ditty" from the Red Hot Chili Peppers' 1989 album Mother's Milk, so band members Anthony Kiedis, Flea, Chad Smith, and John Frusciante are credited as writers.

"Butterfly" peaked at number one on the US Billboard Hot 100 for two nonconsecutive weeks in March and April 2001. Outside of the United States, the song topped the charts in eight countries: Austria, Denmark, Germany, Greece, Norway, Poland, Romania, and Switzerland. It additionally entered the top 10 in several other countries, including Australia, Canada, the Netherlands, New Zealand, and the United Kingdom. The song has been certified platinum or higher in seven countries.

== Background and composition ==
Crazy Town did not choose to release "Butterfly" as the first single from The Gift of Game. Guitarist Kraig "Squirrel" Tyler explained: "We knew all along we didn't want to release 'Butterfly' first because we didn't want to be known as the band that does 'Butterfly'. We are looking at this like we want to have a career. That isn't who we are." In describing the song, frontman Shifty Shellshock said: "Well, a song like 'Butterfly' is a no-brainer, everyone seems to love that no matter how hard they are, it's very radio friendly, the female audience loves it and at the same time I think we kept our integrity with it, it's not a sell-out song, it's very real and cool and I like it."

In the lyrics of the song, Shellshock calls a lady he has been with "butterfly". One lyric references "Sid and Nancy", which is Sid Vicious of the English punk rock band Sex Pistols and his American girlfriend Nancy Spungen. In the chorus, he repeats the refrain "come my lady" and calls her several terms of endearment. He describes how she has changed his life for the better and wonders if she will stay with him, ending the final verse by thanking her.

== Critical reception ==
"Butterfly" was described by George Lang of the Oklahoman as "a deft blend of hip-hop and rock". As part of a compendium of nu metal music, Alan di Perna of Guitar World magazine described the song as a "hip-hop flavored ballad". Tim Kenneally of Spin wrote that the "butter-smooth come-on" of the song drove album sales to Platinum level, even though he thought it might be "the sappiest hip-hop love song since LL Cool J's 'I Need Love'". Michael Steele, a music director of the pop radio station KIIS-FM, noted the song's crossover appeal in an interview in the Los Angeles Times, declaring that "Butterfly" was "the one that completely crossed over from the rap-rock genre". Spin labelled "Butterfly" as a "nu metal power ballad" and possibly the biggest love song of the entire genre.

It was named the 34th "Most Awesomely Bad Song Ever" by VH1, and rated number three on Billboard's chart for one-hit wonders of the 2000s, compiled in 2009. "Butterfly" was featured in Metal Hammer's "The Top 40 Best Nu Metal Songs Ever Made" list and ranked at #18. The song is ranked #342 on Consequence's list of "Every Alternative Rock No. 1 Hit from Worst to Best".

== Music video ==
The song's music video, directed by Honey, shows the band in a fantastical forest full of butterflies. Shifty Shellshock and Epic Mazur sing praises to two women with butterfly wings (Cynthia Mittweg & Melissa Binzer). At one point in the video, Shifty's star-shaped tattoos fly off into the air. In 2018, the staff of Metal Hammer included the music video in the site's list of "the 13 best nu metal videos".

== Track listings ==
US 7-inch single

A. "Butterfly" – 3:37
B. "Revolving Door" – 3:41

US CD and 12-inch single

A1. "Butterfly" (album version) – 3:37
A2. "Butterfly" (Epic remix) – 3:50
A3. "Butterfly" (Extreme mix) – 3:24
B1. "Butterfly" (Jazzy Jim mix) – 3:21
B2. "Butterfly" (instrumental) – 3:37

UK CD single

1. "Butterfly" (clean album version) – 3:37
2. "Butterfly" (Epic remix) – 3:50
3. "Darkside" (clean album version) – 3:53
4. "Darkside" (video CD extra)

UK cassette single

1. "Butterfly" (clean album version) – 3:37
2. "Butterfly" (Extreme mix) – 3:34

European CD single

1. "Butterfly" (album version) – 3:37
2. "Butterfly" (Extreme mix) – 3:34

European maxi-CD single

1. "Butterfly" (album version) – 3:37
2. "Butterfly" (Extreme mix) – 3:34
3. "Butterfly" (Epic remix) – 3:50
4. "Toxic" (explicit album version) – 2:48

Australian CD single

1. "Butterfly" (clean album version) – 3:37
2. "Butterfly" (Extreme mix) – 3:34
3. "Butterfly" (Jazzy Jim mix) – 3:03
4. "Butterfly" (Epic remix) – 3:50
5. "Only When I'm Drunk" (demo) – 3:04

== Credits and personnel ==
Credits are lifted from the US CD single and The Gift of Game album booklet.

Studios

- Tracked at Westlake Audio (Los Angeles)
- Mixed at Scream Studios (Burbank, California) and The Mix Room (Los Angeles)
- Mastered at Precision Mastering (Hollywood, California)

Personnel

- Shifty Shellshock – lyrics and music (as Seth Binzer), vocals
- Bret Mazur – lyrics and music, vocals, production
- Anthony Kiedis – music ("Pretty Little Ditty")
- Flea – music ("Pretty Little Ditty")
- John Frusciante – music ("Pretty Little Ditty")
- Chad Smith – music ("Pretty Little Ditty")
- Rust Epique – guitar
- Trouble Valli – guitar
- Faydoedeelay – bass
- DJ AM – turntables
- James Bradley Jr. – drums
- Josh Abraham – production, mixing
- Brian Virtue – mixing, engineering
- Tom Baker – mastering

== Charts ==
=== Weekly charts ===
Chart (2001)	Peak position
Australia (ARIA)	4
Austria (Ö3 Austria Top 40)	1
Belgium (Ultratop 50 Flanders)	5
Belgium (Ultratop 50 Wallonia)	9
Canada (Nielsen SoundScan)	3
Canada CHR (Nielsen BDS)	3
Denmark (Tracklisten)	1
Europe (Eurochart Hot 100)	2
Finland (Suomen virallinen lista)	2
France (SNEP)	26
Germany (GfK)	1
Greece (IFPI)	1
Ireland (IRMA)	10
Italy (FIMI)	19
Netherlands (Dutch Top 40)	5
Netherlands (Single Top 100)	8
New Zealand (Recorded Music NZ)	2
Norway (VG-lista)	1
Poland Airplay (Music & Media)	1
Portugal (AFP)	5
Romania (Romanian Top 100)	1
Scottish Singles Sales (Official Charts)	5
Sweden (Sverigetopplistan)	2
Switzerland (Schweizer Hitparade)	1
UK Singles (Official Charts)	3
UK Rock & Metal (Official Charts)	1
US Billboard Hot 100	1
US Alternative Airplay (Billboard)	1
US Dance Singles Sales (Billboard)	1
US Mainstream Rock Airplay (Billboard)	21
US Pop Airplay (Billboard)	2
US Rhythmic Airplay (Billboard)	6

=== Year-end charts ===
Chart (2001)	Position
Australia (ARIA)	12
Austria (Ö3 Austria Top 40)	10
Belgium (Ultratop 50 Flanders)	22
Belgium (Ultratop 50 Wallonia)	51
Brazil (Crowley)	18
Canada (Nielsen SoundScan)	38
Canada Radio (Nielsen BDS)	30
Europe (Eurochart Hot 100)	14
Germany (Media Control)	5
Ireland (IRMA)	57
Netherlands (Dutch Top 40)	14
Netherlands (Single Top 100)	48
New Zealand (RIANZ)	36
Romania (Romanian Top 100)	39
Sweden (Hitlistan)	20
Switzerland (Schweizer Hitparade)	7
UK Singles (OCC)	38
US Billboard Hot 100	29
US Mainstream Top 40 (Billboard)	12
US Modern Rock Tracks (Billboard)	11
US Rhythmic Top 40 (Billboard)	39

=== Decade-end charts ===
Chart (2000–2009)	Position
Germany (Media Control GfK)	56

== Certifications ==
Region	Certification	Certified units/sales
Australia (ARIA)	2× Platinum	140,000^{^}
Austria (IFPI Austria)	Gold	20,000^{*}
Belgium (BRMA)	Gold	25,000^{*}
Denmark (IFPI Danmark)	Platinum	8,000^{^}
Germany (BVMI)	3× Gold	900,000^{‡}
Italy (FIMI)	Gold	50,000^{‡}
New Zealand (RMNZ)	2× Platinum	60,000^{‡}
Norway (IFPI Norway)	Platinum	60,000^{‡}
Sweden (GLF)	Platinum	30,000^{^}
Switzerland (IFPI Switzerland)	Gold	20,000^{^}
United Kingdom (BPI)	Platinum	600,000^{‡}
^{*} Sales figures based on certification alone.^{^} Shipments figures based on certification alone.^{‡} Sales+streaming figures based on certification alone.

== Release history ==
Region	Date	Format(s)	Label(s)	Ref(s).
United States	October 24, 2000	Alternative radio	Columbia	
United States	December 19, 2000	Contemporary hit radio	Columbia	
United States	January 23, 2001	Rhythmic contemporary radio	Columbia	
Europe	February 19, 2001	CD; maxi-CD; 12-inch vinyl	Columbia	
United States	February 20, 2001	CD; 7-inch vinyl; 12-inch vinyl	Columbia	
Australia	March 19, 2001	CD	Columbia	
United Kingdom	March 26, 2001	CD; cassette	Columbia	

== See also ==
- List of Romanian Top 100 number ones of the 2000s
