= Epic Mazur =

American musician

Bret 'Epic' Mazur
- Also known as: Epic; Epic Mazur
- Born: Bret Hadley Mazur; August 31, 1970 (age 55); Brooklyn, New York, U.S.
- Origin: Los Angeles, California, U.S.
- Genres: Rap rock; alternative hip hop; nu metal; rap metal; alternative rock; hip-hop
- Occupations: Record producer; singer; rapper; songwriter; sound designer; mixing engineer
- Instruments: Vocals; bass; keyboards; turntables; beatboxing
- Years active: 1986–2003; 2006–present
- Labels: Columbia
- Formerly of: Crazy Town

Bret Hadley "Epic" Mazur (born August 31, 1970) is an American singer, rapper, and record producer. He is best known as a founder and former frontman of the rap rock band Crazy Town.

== Early life ==
Bret Mazur grew up in Brooklyn, New York, before his parents moved across the nation to Hollywood, Los Angeles. It was here that he began to work as a DJ at age 16, and received the pseudonym "Epic" from a friend. Mazur graduated from William Howard Taft High School in Los Angeles. He then collaborated with Richard Wolf as part of the production team Wolf & Epic on albums by artists including Sheena Easton, Bell Biv DeVoe, Ralph Tresvant, MC Lyte and MC Serch.

== Crazy Town ==
Crazy Town was formed by Mazur and Seth Binzer, who started collaborating in 1995 under the initial name of "The Brimstone Sluggers". By early 1999, they were calling themselves Crazy Town, and the full band consisted of Mazur, Binzer, Rust Epique, James Bradley Jr., Doug Miller, DJ AM, and Antonio Lorenzo "Trouble" Valli. Their debut album, The Gift of Game, was released in November 1999, having been recorded earlier that year. It would become a major success after their 2001 single "Butterfly" reached No. 1 on the Billboard Hot 100, sparking record sales in excess of 1.5 million. Their 2002 follow-up album, Darkhorse, was a commercial failure in comparison, and the band broke up shortly after its release.

Crazy Town announced in 2007 that they had reformed, and Mazur stated that the band's third album, tentatively titled Crazy Town Is Back, would be released right after his upcoming solo album, Strip to This, in spring 2008. Neither album was released, though Crazy Town did release a third studio album, The Brimstone Sluggers, in 2015. Following a year of hiatus from the group, Mazur announced in January 2017 through Facebook that he would no longer tour with the band.

== Feature films and television ==
In 2014, Mazur became the music and audio department head for Sugar Studios LA.

Mazur scores and sound designs feature films. He worked on the 2018 film The Oath.

== Personal life ==
Mazur has one son, named Max, who was born in 1996, and his cousin is actress Monet Mazur. He is of Eastern European Jewish ancestry.
