= Rust Epique =

American guitarist and painter

Background information
- Born: Charles Anthony Lopez; February 29, 1968; Stockton, California, U.S.
- Origin: Hollywood, Los Angeles, California, U.S.
- Died: March 9, 2004 (aged 36) Las Vegas, Nevada, U.S.
- Genres: Alternative metal, nu metal, rap rock
- Occupations: Musician, painter
- Instruments: Guitar, vocals
- Years active: 1999–2004
- Label: V2 Records
- Formerly of: Crazy Town pre)Thing

Charles Anthony Lopez (February 29, 1968 – March 9, 2004), better known by his stage name Rust Epique, was an American guitarist and painter, who performed with the bands Crazy Town and pre)Thing.

== Biography ==
In 1999, Rust Epique joined Crazy Town, a rap metal band from Los Angeles. Despite his success with Crazy Town, Epique quit the band as a result of various disagreements with his bandmates. In 2003, V2 Records signed Epique to work with a band called Pre)Thing. They released their debut album, 22nd Century Lifestyle, in 2004.

Rust Epique died of a heart attack at his home in Las Vegas in 2004.
