= Koxbox =

Danish psychedelic trance group

Koxbox is a Danish musical group formed in 1990 that produced psychedelic trance. It consisted of Peter Candy and Frank É Madsen. Ian Ion, their studio producer, is also sometimes mentioned as part of the group.

== History ==
After publishing a few singles, the group was discovered by DJ Sven Väth, and soon, they published their first album Forever After (under his record label Harthouse). The group later produced another two albums: Dragon Tales, and The Great Unknown. In 1998, Peter Candy left the Koxbox.

This marked the end of the original Koxbox lineup, but Frank É Madsen and Ian Ion continued to produce. Already in 1997, they had renamed their own musical group Psychopod to Saiko-Pod, adopting a somewhat different style (perhaps best described as slower and funkier). In 2006, six years after the release of The Great Unknown, Koxbox returned with U-Turn, released on Twisted Records. This most recent album contained collaborations with some of psychedelic dance music's best established artists including Joie Hinton and Merv Pepler (Eat Static, Ozric Tentacles), Frederic Holyszewski (Deedrah, Dado, Cypher, Transwave) and Serge Souque (Total Eclipse) as well as others.

== Music ==
The Koxbox gained considerable popularity within the psytrance scene. Their work was of exceptional quality and differentiated them from most groups of the time. They used innovative sounds that make the Koxbox music characteristic to trained ears. They had a preference for rich, melodic tunes, and this was much appreciated at a time when the Goa subgenre was the most popular psytrance style.

They have remixed tracks by Juno Reactor and Slinky Wizard.

Their tracks Fuel On, Ambivalentino, and Midnight Till The End appear in the Danish movie Pusher. The latter track was produced especially to be used in the movie.

There exists a video clip for the track "Life is...", but nobody knows how to obtain it. A truncated (2 minutes, 33 seconds long) lo-fi RealMedia version of the clip was available for free download at the Blue Room Released website, under the band's section. The domain blueroom.co.uk is now owned by the M.E.L.T record label and the old Blue Room pages, along with the clip, are unavailable. However, this rare file is still circulated on file sharing networks.

== Discography ==
=== Albums ===
- Forever After Double Vinyl & CD album (1995, Harthouse)
- Dragon Tales Double Vinyl & CD album (1997, Blue Room Released)
- The Great Unknown Triple Vinyl & CD album (2000, Liquid Audio Soundz / Global Trance Network)
- U-Turn CD album (2006, Twisted Records)
- The Scanner CD album (2015, Zero One Music)

=== Singles/EPs ===
- Acid Vol. 3 & Birdy 12" Vinyl single (1993, Outloud Records)
- Crystal / World Of Illusions 12" Vinyl single (1993, Where's the Party records)
- Flashback 12" Vinyl single (1994, Harthouse)
- Acid Vol. 3 10" Vinyl single (1994,Harthouse)
- Insect / Insect Bite 12" Vinyl single (1994, Harthouse)
- Re-Oscillation 12" Vinyl & CD single (1995, Harthouse)
- Insect Bite EP 12" Vinyl single (1995, Harthouse)
- Tribal Oscillation (Remixes) 12" Vinyl single (1995, Harthouse)
- Stratosfear Vinyl & CD single (1996, Blue Room Released)
- Life Is... Vinyl & CD single (1997, Blue Room Released)
- Too Pure Vinyl & CD single (1997, Blue Room Released)
- Forever E.P. 12" Vinyl single (1999, Matsuri Productions)
- A Major Problem In Australia EP Triple Vinyl & CD (2000, Liquid Audio Soundz / Global Trance Network)

== Samples ==
Doktor Mesmer
"Doktor Mesmer" from Dragon Tales

== See also ==
- Psychedelic trance
- Goa trance music
