= The Matrix Reloaded: Limited Edition =

The Matrix Reloaded: Limited 2-CD set Edition

Soundtrack album by Don Davis
- Released: August 27, 2013
- Recorded: February 11–14 and 18–21, 2003; Newman Scoring Stage, 20th Century Fox (Los Angeles, California)
- Genre: Film score
- Length: 153:25
- Label: La-La Land Records
- Producer: Don Davis

The Matrix Reloaded: Limited Edition (2-CD Set) is a score album to the 2003 film The Matrix Reloaded. It was officially released on August 27, 2013. Unlike the first soundtrack, which featured songs from the film, this release includes almost the entire film's score on two discs. Owing to licensing issues, the soundtrack does not include the film versions of two cues, Free Flight and Double Trouble.

Prior to the La-La Land release, a bootleg version had surfaced containing much the same material as the official release. However, despite being billed as the complete score, that album did not include a number of cues from the film, such as the extended version of the track "The Bane Transformation" and the cue directly after it, "The Bane Voyage".

== Track listing ==
Disc 1
No.	Title	Writer(s)	Length
1.	"Main Title/Trinity vs. Car"	Don Davis	3:24
2.	"Enter the Neb"	Don Davis	1:11
3.	"Smith at the Door"	Don Davis	4:17
4.	"Furious Angels"	Rob Dougan	5:32
5.	"Smith vs. Smith*/Free Flight"	Don Davis	3:40
6.	"The Wonder of Zion/The Lascivious Lift/Link and Zee"	Don Davis	4:37
7.	"Morpheus on the Mount/Zion Drum Source"	Don Davis	2:50
8.	"Zion"	Fluke	1:23
9.	"Goodnight Zion*/The Bane Transformation"	Don Davis	2:42
10.	"Bane Voyage"	Don Davis	2:58
11.	"First, I Must Apologize"	Don Davis	1:12
12.	"Teahouse"	Juno Reactor featuring Gocoo	1:07
13.	"The Industrial Highway"	Don Davis	1:16
14.	"Oracle Oratory"	Don Davis	2:05
15.	"The Purpose That Created Us"	Don Davis	2:59
16.	"Burly Brawl"	Don Davis vs. Juno Reactor	1:17
17.	"Council of Cool/Meeting the Merovingian"	Don Davis	3:48
18.	"Choice Is an Illusion"	Don Davis	2:42
19.	"Sample This"	Don Davis & Juno Reactor	3:54
20.	"Meet the Keymaker/Some Skill"	Don Davis	1:33
21.	"Chateau"	Rob Dougan	3:26
22.	"Double Trouble"	Don Davis	2:22
23.	"Mona Lisa Overdrive"	Don Davis & Juno Reactor	10:16
Total length:			1:18:17

Disc 2
No.	Title	Writer(s)	Length
1.	"Truck vs. Truck/The Plan/Final Flight of the Vigilant"	Don Davis	11:36
2.	"Kill the Keymaker/Doddering Old Fool"	Don Davis	6:07
3.	"The Problem Is Choice/Window Switch/Neo Miraculous/No More Nebuchadnezzer/Conclusion Confusion"	Don Davis	13:33
4.	"Niaiserie"	Kerry Walsh	6:05
5.	"Burly Brawl (alternate)"	Don Davis	5:58
6.	"Chateau Swashbuckling (alternate)"	Don Davis	3:49
7.	"The Plan (with synth)"	Don Davis	4:18
8.	"Niaiserie (instrumental)"	Don Davis	6:01
9.	"Matrix Reloaded Suite"	Don Davis	17:41
Total length:			1:15:08

Composed, orchestrated and conducted by Don Davis. Performed by The Hollywood Studio Symphony.

== Critical reception ==
Though reviews of this soundtrack have been relatively scarce in comparison to the first one, the overall reaction to the release has been positive. Positive reviews have come from websites Discogs (4 out of 5 stars) and Soundtrack DB (4 out of 5 stars), as well as favorable review from the blog 5:4.

This soundtrack includes tracks that do not appear in the movie. Davis's tracks "Burly Brawl (Alternate)" and "Chateau Swashbuckling (Alternate)" were unused in favor of alternate versions by Juno Reactor and Rob Dougan, respectively, with the latter portion of the unused "Burly Brawl" is heavily modified in the film to become the latter portion of the final film version of "Burly Brawl". Additionally, Davis's version of "Double Trouble" was altered in the film with the addition of samples from the song "Dread Rock" by Oakenfold, which is found on the first Matrix Reloaded soundtrack.

== See also ==
- Simulated Reality
