= Labyrinth (Juno Reactor album) =

Studio album by Juno Reactor
- Released: 26 October 2004 (US); 29 September 2004 (Japan)
- Studios: Ridge Farm Studio, The Paramour, Fox Soundstage, Egg Studio Fuji, O'Henrys, Los Angeles
- Genres: Goa trance; world; film score
- Length: 53:54
- Labels: Metropolis; Universal
- Producer: Juno Reactor

Juno Reactor chronology
| Shango (2000) | Labyrinth (2004) | Gods & Monsters (2008) |

Singles from Labyrinth
- 1. "Zwara" Released: 26 November 2003

Professional ratings
Review scores
| Source | Rating |
|---|---|
| Allmusic | link |

Labyrinth is the sixth studio album released by the multi-genre electronic/trance group Juno Reactor. It was released on 26 October 2004 in the United States and on 29 September 2004 in Japan.

== Overview ==
The album contains several pieces that hold various forms of sound ranging from orchestral, industrial, and techno as well as containing Juno Reactor's trademark tribal sound (possibly as best featured in Conquistador II). The album also features two songs from Watkins' collaboration with The Matrix composer Don Davis on the films The Matrix Reloaded and The Matrix Revolutions, "Mona Lisa Overdrive" (from Reloaded) and "Navras" (from Revolutions). The version of "Mona Lisa Overdrive" is different from that featured on the film's soundtrack. It is shortened from its original time of 10:08 to 4:45 and there are easily noticeable differences in the sound of the bass and tone of the songs. "Navras" is a remix of Davis' song "Neodämmerung" (German for "The Twilight of Neo") that was played over the end credits of The Matrix Revolutions. One known single of "Zwara" was released in Japan on 26 November2003, as a promo.

== Track listing ==
All tracks are written by Ben Watkins.

| No. | Title | Length |
|---|---|---|
| 1. | "Conquistador I" (with Eduardo Niebla) | 6:02 |
| 2. | "Conquistador II" (with Mabi Thobejane and Nick Burton) | 5:06 |
| 3. | "Giant" (with Diane Charlemagne) | 4:00 |
| 4. | "War Dogs" (with Budgie, Eduardo Niebla and Nick Burton) | 5:00 |
| 5. | "Mona Lisa Overdrive" (with Don Davis) | 4:45 |
| 6. | "Zwara" (with Susan Hendricks) | 6:35 |
| 7. | "Mutant Message" (with Xavier Morel) | 6:10 |
| 8. | "Angels and Men" (with Taz Alexander) | 7:07 |
| 9. | "Navras" (with Don Davis) | 9:06 |
| Total length: | | 53:54 |

== Personnel ==
=== Musicians ===
- Taz Alexander – vocals
- Azam Ali – vocals
- Budgie – drums
- Nick Burton – percussion, drum editing
- Don Davis – orchestration and conductor
- Calina De La Mare – violin
- Greg Ellis – percussion, drums
- Mike Fisher – percussion
- Gocoo – Taiko drums
- Hollywood Film Chorale – choir, chorus
- Greg Hunter – engineering, bass guitar, mixing
- Victor Indrizzo – drums
- Susan Hendricks – vocals
- Risenga Makondo – percussion
- Simpiwe Matole – percussion
- Xavier Morel – sonic forager
- Eduardo Niebla – guitar
- Deepak Ram – vocals, flute
- Scarlet – guitar
- Lakshmi Shankar – vocals
- Mabi Thobejane – percussion, vocals
- Tigram – ney
- Youth – bass guitar

=== Production ===
- Juno Reactor – production
- Toto Annihilation – engineering
- Zig Gron – music editor
- Adam Wren – mixing
- Simon Watkins – album art/photography
- Scott Oyster – engineering
- Kevin Metcalfe – mastering

== Trivia ==
- Track "Angels and Men" used in the "Dimension Bomb" animation from Genius Party Beyond.
- Track "Mona Lisa Overdrive" was produced with Don Davis, the composer for The Matrix series, and was used for the highway chase scene in The Matrix: Reloaded.
