= Dado =

Dado may refer to:

== Architecture and joinery ==
- Dado (architecture), an architectural term for the lower part of a wall
- Dado rail, a type of moulding fixed at mid-height horizontally to the wall
- Dado (joinery), a woodworking joint
  - Dado set, a circular saw blade used for cutting dado joints

== People ==
=== Given name ===
Dado is a diminutive of a number of given name and occasionally a given name by itself. Notable people with the given name include:

- Audoin (bishop) (609-686), Frankish bishop, courtier, chronicler and Catholic saint known as Dado
- Dado, Bishop of Verdun (880-923)
- Dado, Count of Pombia (died 980), Italian nobleman
- Diosdado Dado Banatao (born 1946), Filipino-American entrepreneur and engineer
- Luis Dado Cavalcanti (born 1981), Brazilian football manager
- Dado Dolabella (born 1980), Brazilian actor and singer
- David Dado Elazar (1925–1976), Israeli Army Chief-of-Staff
- Salvador Dado Marino (1915–1989), American flyweight world champion boxer
- Edgardo Dado Moroni (born 1962), Italian jazz pianist and composer
- Damir Dado Polumenta (born 1982), Montenegrin pop-folk singer
- Dado Pršo (born 1974), Croatian football player
- Alessandro Ruspoli, 9th Prince of Cerveteri (1924–2005), Italian playboy and occasional actor nicknamed "Dado"
- Dado Topić (born 1949), Croatian singer
- Dado (painter), Yugoslavian-born painter Miodrag Đurić (1933–2010)
- Dado (street performer), stage name of Canadian street performer, magician and clown Daniel Warr (fl. 1997-present)
- Little Dado, Filipino bantamweight and flyweight world champion boxer Eleuterio Zapanta (1916–1965)
- Speedy Dado, Filipino boxer Diosdado Posadas (1906–1990)

=== Patronymic ===
- Firehiwot Dado (born 1984), Ethiopian long-distance runner

== Other uses ==
- Dado, Afghanistan, the district center of Zana Khan district in Ghazni Province
- Dado (band), an Uzbekistani pop band
- The Dado Center for Interdisciplinary Military Studies, an Israeli strategy think tank inside the Israel Defense Forces
- District Agriculture Development Office (DADO), local offices under Ministry of Agricultural Development (Nepal)
