= Freddy Fresh =

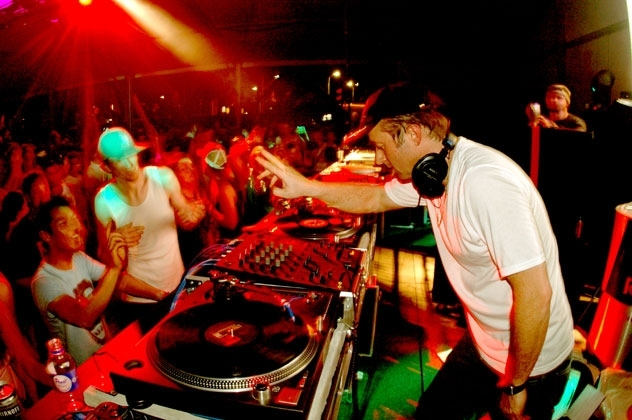
- Freddy Fresh performing in Australia, 2007

Background information
- Born: Frederick Schmid; Minneapolis, Minnesota, United States
- Genres: Electronic; techno; electro; trance; house; hip hop
- Occupations: DJ; musician; record producer; composer; author
- Years active: 1992–present
- Labels: Sony UK; Virgin; BMG UK; Harthouse; Howlin'; Electric Music Foundation; Analog
- Website: freddyfresh.com

Frederick Schmid, better known by his stage name Freddy Fresh, is an American DJ, musician, and electronic music producer. Fresh has recorded for over 100 independent record labels, including major labels Sony UK, Virgin, BMG UK, and Harthouse Germany. He is also founder of the record labels Howlin' Records, Electric Music Foundation, and Analog.

Fresh had two international hit records in the UK, "Badder Badder Schwing" (featuring Fatboy Slim) and "What It Is". Fresh has performed in clubs, as well as festivals, including Glastonbury Festival, Creamfields Festival UK, Reading-Leeds Festival, and Jazz and Groove Festival.

== Early life ==
Fresh was born Frederick Schmid, in Minneapolis, Minnesota, United States.

== Career ==
In addition to a growing U.S. audience, Fresh was also one of the few contemporary non-Detroit musicians of the techno/electro genre to receive a strong European following. His records for Experimental, Harthouse and Martin "Biochip C" Damm's Anodyne label were evidence of his popularity in Europe and also strengthened his international presence. Although Fresh's releases included tracks in hip hop, house music, techno and trance music, his musical essence exists in the electro and breaks subgenres.

Although Fresh grew up listening to gothic rock and new wave, a trip to the Bronx, New York, U.S. in 1984 introduced him to the hip hop scene. Fresh began collecting DJ tapes (Shep Pettibone and Marley Marl) and records from the Jonzun Crew, Newcleus, Liquid Liquid, Cerrone, Shannon and Cat Stevens.

Fresh's first studio recording was released on Boogie Down Productions, with Fresh remixing a track for The Man & His Music Dedication album for Scott La Rock. Fresh then constructed his own studio, collecting numerous analog and modular synthesizers as part of the building process. In 1992, after releasing debut singles on Nu Groove and Experimental, Fresh's first record label, Analog Recordings, was formed in late 1992, and grew to include numerous imprints: Analog UK, Butterbeat, Electric Music Foundation, Sockett and Boriqua.

The label and its offshoots have since attracted Thomas Heckman, Tim Taylor, Cari Lekebusch, DJ Slip, the Bassbin Twins, and Biochip C. In 1995, Fresh signed a contract with German techno label Harthouse Records and his second full-length album, Accidentally Classic, was released by the label's UK arm in late 1996 – a Harthouse U.S. reissue was later released.

His third album, The Last True Family Man, was released on the Eye Q label and resulted in two international chart hits, "Badder Badder Schwing" (featuring Fat Boy Slim) and "What It Is". The recordings peaked at number 34 and number 63, respectively, in the 1999 UK Singles Chart. Several singles and a mix album followed, until 2001's release, Music for Swingers. Fresh subsequently issued numerous albums on Howlin Records.

In the late 1990s, he formed the record label Against The Grain with then-partner Krafty Kuts. Fresh also released records through the Wisconsin, U.S.-based Drop Bass Network and the German label "Electrecord."

In 2000, Fresh also formed a collectors label specializing in vinyl 45 singles, called "Howlin' Records", and released over 35 singles and four albums through the label. The catalog of Howlin' Record includes "Have Records Will Travel," "Outstanding in His Field," "Diggin' Up Ghosts," "Surrounded By Funk" and Howlin' Greatest Hits.

In 2004, Fresh released the reference book entitled Freddy Fresh Presents The Rap Records, which covers the history of the early independent "old school" rap scene, and provides an extensive catalog of rap releases from 1979 to 1989. The book was featured in The Source, Vibe, The New York Times and Village Voice, and won journalism awards in the U.S. — it is recognized as the only reference book on the subject. Fresh released the updated second edition, with over 740 pages and more than 2,500 color photographs.

In 2008, Fresh released the updated Freddy Fresh Presents The Rap Records Book Revised Edition that contains thousands of full-color photos from the independent rap scene.

In 2014, Fresh taught DJ techniques at the McNally Smith College of Music in St. Paul, Minnesota. He began work on his next album, Play The Music, with a launch of various singles starting with the song "Hardcore Rocka" done with Andy Ictus feat. Jamaica reggae stars Tanto Metro & Devonte with a video released in October 2014.

== Discography ==
=== Albums ===
- Play The Music (CD, Album) HCD08 2015
- Textura (20xFile, MP3, 320) Howlin' Records HDG 04 2009
- Tangene (10xFile, MP3, Album) Howlin' Records HDG 03 2009
- Time Again (15xFile, MP3, 320) Howlin' Records HDG 01 2008
- Freddy Fresh Presents Rory Hoy - Cosmic Child (CD, Album) Howlin' Records HCD06 2008
- Surrounded By Funk 2 versions Howlin' Records 2007
- Freddy Fresh Presents The Conductor Crucified - Its Sorta Like Sweeping in the Wind (CD, Album) Stark Ravin' Records SRCD01 2007
- Diggin' Up Ghosts (CD, Album) Howlin' Records HCD03 2005
- Outstanding in His Field (CD, Album) Howlin' RecordsHowlin' CD 02 2004
- Have Record Will Travel 2 versions Howlin' Records 2003
- Freddy Fresh & MPC Genius - The Trainspotters Dream Mastermix Vol. 3 (CD, Album, Mixed, Promo) Delic Records FFCD-003 2003
- Music For Swingers 2 versions Brooklyn Music Limited (BML) 2002
- Watch That Sound 2 versions Millennium Records 2002
- Freddy Fresh & MPC Genius - The Trainspotters Dream Mix Vol. 1 (CD, Album, Mixed, Promo) Howlin' Records 2002
- Freddy Fresh & MPC Genius - The Trainspotters Dream Mastermix Vol. 1 (CD, Album, Mixed, Promo) Delic Records FFCD-002 2002
- The Last True Family Man 8 versions Eye Q (UK) 1998
- Accidentally Classic 3 versions Harthouse1996
- Freddy Fresh / Biochip C. - Los Amigos En Electro 2 versions Anodyne (2)1996
- Analog Space Funk (CD, Album) Analog Records USA none 1996
- Freddie Fresh* Presents Nitrate - Acid Stuker (CD, Album) Death Becomes Me, Labworks UK DBMLABCD 9 1996

=== Singles and EPs ===
- Freddy Fresh, Kitten and The Hip HDG15 2014
- Freddy Fresh, Andy Ictus, Tanto Metro & Devonte - Hardcore Rocka (File, AIFF, EP) Howlin' Records HDG14 2014
- Paul Birken And Freddy Fresh - Midwest Whippersnappers EP (12", EP) Earwiggle EAR 003 2012
- Freddy Fresh / Mick & Marc - Big M Productions Presents... Vol.1 (12", Promo)Big M Productions BigMP01 2009
- Tasty EP (12", EP, Ltd) Howlin' Records, Howlin' Records HOWLIN1201, Howlin' 01 / 12 2007
- Flamenco (7") Howlin' Records Howlin' 32 2004
- For Alex (7") Howlin' Records Howlin' 30 2004
- Winter / Black Out (12") Electric Music Foundation EMF 032003
- They Can't Compete (7") Howlin' Records Howlin' 262003 *VTreacherous Three / Freddy Fresh - Bum Bum Bum Bum / He Lay Face Down(7") Howlin' Records Howlin' 25 2003
- Bowlin' With Mike (7") Howlin' Records Howlin' 27 2003
- Orange Krush (7", Ltd, Cle) Electric Music Foundation EMF 02.5 2003
- Boricua House Party 2 versions Peppermint Jam 2002
- Sunshine / That Big Beat Feeling 2 versions Howlin' Records 2002
- Music For Swingers 2 versions Howlin' Records 2002
- Feel The Groove EP 2 versions Electric Music Foundation 2002
- Freddy Fresh / Spear 'N Jackson - Music for the Younger Set / Babysitting 2 versions Howlin' Records 2001
- Abstract Funk Theory Sampler (12", Smplr) Obsessive EVSLP17E1 2001
- Krafty Kuts / Freddy Fresh - Stop The Nonsense / La Chunga (7") Howlin' Records- Howlin' 03 2001
- Dynamo Productions / Freddy Fresh w/ Skate Board Kings - A Message From The King / Are You Feelin' It (7") Howlin' Records Howlin' 11 2001
- Abstract Funk Theory Sampler (12", Smplr) Obsessive EVSLP17S 2001
- Still/ The Joint Sugarhill Remixed (Megamix) (12", S/Sided, TP) Sanctuary Records CLK12001 2000
- Have Some Faith / Badder Badder Schwing (Unreleased Japanese Edit) (7", Promo) Howlin' Records -Howlin' 02 2000
- Freddy Hums Your Favourites (12") Kingsize KS 42 2000
- Freddy Fresh Featuring Fatboy Slim - Badder Badder Schwing 6 versions Eye Q (UK) 1998
- What It Is 8 versions Eye Q (UK) 1999
- Freddy Fresh / Le Tone / First Born* / Space Raiders - Untitled (CD, Single, Comp) Sony Music SINE 001CD 1999
- Yew'r A Sissy (10", Promo) Fresh (UK) FRESH 001 1999
- Freddy Fresh & Beat Archaeo'logist, The / Silverkick - Mr Roachclip / Voyle(7", Num) Slut Smalls SMALL 005 1999
- It's About the Groove 5 versions Eye Q (UK) 1998
- Tim Taylor & Freddy Fresh - Fear of Music 2 2 versions Fear of Music 1998
- Down for the Count 4 versions Eye Q (UK) 1998
- DJ Voodoo (2) & DJ Tree / Freddie Fresh* - A Voodoo Nation (12") Swell Records SWELL007 1998
- Quiver 2 versions Analog Records USA 1997
- Barrio Grooves 3 versions Harthouse 1997
- Chupacabbra 3 versions Harthouse 1997
- Flava 3 versions Harthouse 1997
- Drum Lesson 3 versions Eye Q (UK) 1997
- Freddie Fresh* Featuring Invisible Man, The* - Fresh Is The Word 2 versions Sockett 1997
- Yew'r A Sissy 2 2 versions Fresh (UK) 1997
- Analogue Space Funk EP 2 versions Holzplatten 1997
- Axodya Limited 007 (12") Axodya Axodya Limited 007 1997
- Scared (12") Pussy Lick PL01 1997
- Dan Zamani, DJ Slip, Freddie Fresh* & Tim Taylor - Minneapolis Sessions Part 2 (12") Analog Records USA Analog 33 1997
- Freddie Fresh*, Tim Taylor, DJ Slip & Dan Zamani - The Minneapolis Sessions(2x12") Missile Records Missile 20 1997
- Smells Like Funk 4 versions Harthouse 1996
- D.J. Delite 2 versions Electric Music Foundation 1995
- Freddie Fresh* / Andre Estrada - Aurora EP 2 versions Analog UK 1995
- Freddie Fresh* / Brixton - Analog 23 2 versions Analog Records USA 1996
- 'Lectro Outtakes 3 versions Electrecord (2) 1996
- Tension EP 2 versions Emergency Broadcast, PIAS Holland 1996
- Freddie Fresh* & Tim Taylor - Untitled 2 versions Not on Label 1996
- Federico Fresh* y Loco Puertoriqueno - Abusadora EP (12", EP) Boriqua BF01 1996
- Paul Mix & Freddie Fresh* - Gates (12") Analog UK anauk03 1996
- Freddie Fresh* / Auto Kinetic - Auto Kinetic vs. Freddie Fresh (12") Electric Music Foundation EF17-12 1996
- Freddie Fresh* Presents Nitrate - The Fog (12") Death Becomes Me, Labworks UK DBMUNDLAB027 1996
- Brixton vs. Freddie Fresh* - 505 Track (12", Whi) X0X Track TR 505 1996
- Flotsom (12") Harthouse HHUK 005 1996
- Logical Grooves (12") Hybrid Sound Architectures HYB 022 1996
- Comatone 95 2 versions Electric Music Foundation 1995
- Freddie Fresh* / Mike Henk - Untitled 3 versions Pulsar Recordings 1995
- Freddie Fresh* vs. Dr. Walker - DJ Fresh Analog U.S. Vs. Walker Cologne DJ.Ungle Fever Germany 2 versions Analog Records USA 1995
- Freddie Fresh* & Woody McBride - Psychopocalyptic 95 3 versions Analog Records USA 1995
- Federico Fresh* / Biochip C. - Los Amigos En Acid 2 versions Analog Records USA 1995
- Freddie Fresh* & Tim Taylor - St Paul EP 2 versions UXB 1995
- House of Electronics 2 versions Psycho Trax 1995
- Freddie Fresh* & Tim Taylor - The Penguin / Scissorhands 2 versions Missile Records 1995
- DJ Hyperactive / Freddie Fresh* - Alien Funk (12") Delirium USA delerium usa 950603 1995
- Brixton vs. Frederick Frisch* - Kein Anschluss (12") Holzplatten HOLZ005 1995
- Thought Process 2 versions Analog Records USA 1994
- Equinox (5) / Freddie Fresh* - Pollux / The Searchers 2 versions Synewave London 1994
- From Minneapolis To Paris 2 versions Radikal Groov Records 1994
- Analogical Mind (12", Cle + 12", Cle) Dj.ungle Fever D.J.UNGLE FEVER 014 1994
- Gnarl EP (12", EP) Drop Bass Network DBN014 1994
- Freddie Fresh* / Paul Mix - Blinky & Hud E.P. 3 versions Analog Records USA, Digidl 1993
- Paul Mix & Freddie Fresh* - Compilation #001 2 versions Analog Records USA, Digidl 1993
- Advanced Waveform Synthetix 2 versions Experimental 1993
- Freddie Fresh* / Auto Kinetic - TBor notTB / Diode (7", Cle) Electric Music Foundation EF 01-7 1993
- Freddie Fresh* / Auto Kinetic - Tarantula / Pterodactyl (7", Ltd, Cle) Electric Music Foundation, Electric Music Foundation EF 03–7, EF03-7 1993
- The Rave Mixes Volume 1 (12") Rave Records (USA) RM 912 1992
- Hidden Rhythm (2) & Freddie Fresh* - B.O.O.M. (12") Nu Groove Records NG-109 1992
- Comatone EP (12", EP) EXperimental EX-09 1992
- Feelin' Mighty Fresh 2 versions Sensuist Records Unknown
- 909 Track (12") X0X Track TR 909 Unknown

=== Compilation albums ===
- Abstract Funk Theory 3 versions Obsessive 2001

=== DJ mixes ===
- The Rap Records - The Mastermix (3xCD, Mixed) Ful-Fill Recording FFR007 2010
- The Essential Mix 3 versions Word Up Records 1998
- Freddy Fresh Presents B-Boy Stance (Original Old Skool Party Rockers) 3 versions Strut 2002
- Still / The Joint (CD, Mixed) Sanctuary Records SANCD008 2000
- DJ Freddie Fresh* / DJ Tim Taylor* - Transcore Version 4.0 (2xCD, Comp, Mixed) Fairway Record 50548 1995

=== Miscellaneous ===
- Freddy Fresh & MPC Genius - The Trainspotters Dream Mastermix Vol. 2 2 versions Delic Records 2002

== Film and advertising ==
Fresh's music also appeared in films such as Austin Powers in Goldmember and Jackie Chan's The Tuxedo, as well as in television commercials by Adidas, Budweiser, Coors, Ritz Crackers, and Xbox.

== Touring ==
Fresh tours regularly and has DJ'd in over 34 countries, including Russia (Olympic Stadium, where he opened for The Orb), Australia ("Teriyaki Anarki Saki" and Future Entertainment), Canada (MTV Canada) and Spain (Club Spain). He has also been featured on Club TV, S2 and House Viva TV. His list of radio appearances include two Peel sessions for John Peel on BBC Radio 1.

Fresh mixes all his tracks live. He sequences with an MPC 2000XL and MPC 4000, and uses pre-midi analog synthesizers and modular systems.

== Personal life ==
Fresh married his wife, Alexandra, on 21 April 2005, in St. Paul, Minnesota, U.S. The couple are parents of two daughters.
