= The Mutant Theatre =

Studio album by Juno Reactor
- Released: 2018
- Genre: Trance, electronic
- Length: 66:29
- Label: Metropolis

Juno Reactor chronology
The Golden Sun of the Great East (2013)	The Mutant Theatre (2018)

The Mutant Theatre is the ninth studio album by the electronic/trance band Juno Reactor. The album was released on Metropolis Records on June 22, 2018. The tracks "Our World" and "Dakota" were released as singles.

== Reception ==
Professional ratings
Review scores
Source	Rating
Mushroom Magazine	10/10 stars

Mushroom Magazine gave the album a perfect rating of 10/10, stating, "Juno Reactor’s The Mutant Theatre is truly unlike any other dance album out there, as it’s tied to a unique performance experience like none other. The album is diverse, every song being its own story but tied together, and it flows exactly as one would expect the live experience to, with high energy beats, soaring vocals, innovative music styling, and a modern but still solidly traditional production quality. As a total experience, The Mutant Theatre is a 10/10."

In a review for ReGen Magazine, Douglas Leach wrote, "The Mutant Theatre could have made a great five track EP, and perhaps in the context of the live show those last tracks could be better. But taken on their own, they just feel average. The album is still definitely worth listening to and is still a fine example of the genre."

In a review for We Are Unseen, Richard Spencer wrote, "Viewed purely as dance fodder either for yourself or the flashing bodies on the stage before you, Juno Reactor – the Mutant Theatre ticks all the boxes. As a listening-only experience, lots of things are done right too, but the fact remains that nothing ever quite matches the pinnacles reached by the excellent twists and turns of the first track, and everything is generally a little overlong if you’re not in a purely shape-throwing mood."

== Track listing ==
1. "Return of the Pistolero" – 11:09
2. "Our World" – 7:38
3. "Let's Turn On" – 6:59
4. "Dakota" – 6:13
5. "Alien" – 7:57
6. "The Sky Is Blue the Sky Is Black" – 6:38
7. "Showtime" – 5:36
8. "Voyager 304" - 6:48
9. "Tannhauser Gate" – 6:00

== Personnel ==
- Artwork, Design - Mitsuru, Simon Watkins
- Engineer - Otto the Barbarian
- Producer - Juno Reactor
