= The Golden Sun of the Great East =

Studio album by Juno Reactor
- Released: 2013
- Genre: Trance, electronic
- Length: 65:19
- Label: Metropolis

Juno Reactor chronology
Gods & Monsters (2008)	The Golden Sun of the Great East (2013)	The Mutant Theatre (2018)

Professional ratings
Review scores
Source	Rating
PopMatters	8/10 stars
Data Transmission	8/10 stars
Blurt	4/5 stars

The Golden Sun of the Great East is the eighth studio album by the electronic/trance band Juno Reactor. The album was released on April 23, 2013 in the United States on Metropolis Records and on May 20, 2013 in the United Kingdom. The track "Final Frontier" was released in advance as a single on April 2, 2013.

== Track listing ==
1. "Final Frontier" – 10:02
2. "Invisible" – 8:45
3. "Guillotine" – 6:57
4. "Trans Siberian" – 7:52
5. "Shine" – 5:26
6. "Tempest" – 7:55
7. "Zombie" – 6:41
8. "To Byculla" – 4:58
9. "Playing with Fire" – 6:38

== Personnel ==
- Artwork - Simon Watkins
- Design - Michael Snyder
- Mastered By - Charles Michaud
- Mixed By - Adam Wren, Juno Reactor
- Written By - Ben Watkins

== Reception ==
Zachary Houle of PopMatters gave the album an rating of 8/10, writing, "If there's one word that describes the eighth and latest album from Juno Reactor, it is this: epic."

Gil Macias of Blurt gave the album a rating of 4/5, writing, "Maestro Ben Watkins, creator of Juno Reactor, has put out one of the best albums of his career. In fact, this easily ranks up in the top three Juno Reactor albums so far. Even when paying homage to their roots, the band continues to remain an evolving experiment, always fresh, and they once again proved they can’t be slapped under one single genre label."

The website Data Transmission gave it a rating of 8/10, writing that it is "Well worth throwing off preconceptions and diving in."

The website reflectionsofdarkness.com gave it a rating of 7.5/10, writing, "This album can certainly be enjoyed and relaxed to, though it’s not exactly ground-breaking and the Eastern influences and even the compositions sometimes can be far too predictable."

In a positive review for Intravenous Magazine, Sean Palfrey wrote, "With 'The Golden Sun Of The Great East', Watkins returns to do what he does best. There isn't any need to fix what isn't broken. Instead Watkins focusses on the kind sheer cinematic scope and evocative song writing that is begging to be part of a huge live show."
