= Avatar Records (electronic music) =

Tel Aviv-based independent record label and digital distributor

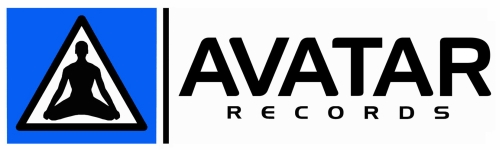
- Founded: 1997
- Founder: Avichay Avigal, Peter Eibenschutz
- Distributor(s): Avatar Records; Ingrooves / Universal; Helicon (IL); Arabesque (UK); Wakyo (Japan); Virgin / EMI (India); EQ (Singapore / Malaysia)
- Genre: Electronic music, Psytrance, Goa trance, Ambient, Chillout, Lounge, Yoga
- Country of origin: Israel, Morocco
- Official website: www.avatar-music.com www.avatar-records.com

Avatar Records is a Tel Aviv-based independent record label and digital distributor specializing in electronic music, providing music to online retailers including Apple Music, iTunes, Spotify and Beatport. The company was founded by Avichay Avigal and Peter Eibenschutz in 1997. The label initially had an alliance with NMC Music, when it first started as its subsidiary. Later, Avatar was in collaboration with BNE, before finally becoming a fully independent label.

Projects released on Avatar include albums from Asia 2001, Goa Gil, Nimba, The Nommos, Electric Universe, Toi Doi, Thomas Leer, Lumen, Ocelot, Pete Namlook & Mixmaster Morris, Jupiter 8000, Overdream, Enichkin, Celtic Cross, Becoming.Intense & Pharmacore, Prana, Sandman, GMS, Hux Flux, Orion, Indoor, The Infinity Project, Cydonia, Synchro, Sonic Scope, Psychoz, Astropilot, Elysium, Reflex. and more.

== History ==
=== Early years: 1997–2003 ===
During its first years, Avatar focused on releases from big names. Later, it became more interested in discovering new names. Names like Toi Doi, Overdream, Psychoz and Astropilot have all started with Avatar.

Avatar was the first label to release psychedelic trance music locally in India, Mexico and Poland.

=== Later years: 2004–present ===
In 2004, Avatar had its entire catalogue available on The Orchard, and this remained so until the bankruptcy of BNE, and was followed by a lawsuit of Avatar against BNE.

In 2008, Avatar became a fully independent label, and signed with Ingrooves/Universal.

== Notable releases ==
- Asia 2001 - Ama Zone, the first Avatar release. Also released by Sony Music under Goa 2001, it was the first psychedelic trance release in India.
- Thomas Leer - Conversation Peace (half of the duo Act with Claudia Brücken from Propaganda
- GMS - Chaos Laboratory
- X-Dream - We Created Our Own Happiness
- The Kumba Mela Experiment - East Of River Ganges album
- Retrodelic Vibes series, considered the unofficial bible of psytrance music
- Goa Gil - Karmageddon
- Toi Doi - Technologic
- Indoor - Progressive Trance (the Beatles of Israeli trance)
- The Nommos - Emme Ya

== Avatar Sublabels ==
=== Avatar Spirit ===
Avatar Spirit is the Chillout and Lounge label of Avatar. In addition it releases Yoga and Café music from India, Morocco, The Middle East, Arabia and The Orient.

=== ProFile ===
The classics label of Avatar that features some of the best All Time favorite albums in psytrance and ambient. Releases from Goa Gil, Orion, Pete Namlook, Indoor, Sandman, Space Cat, The Infinity Project, Total Eclipse, Celtic Cross, GMS, X-Dream, Hux Flux, The Kumba Mela Experiment, and more

=== Trans'pact ===
Established in 1992 with its sub labels Doss House and Subliminal Records.

== Past and present artists ==
- Argyria
- Asia 2001
- Becoming.Intense
- Domino
- Electric Universe
- Elysium
- Enichkin
- Goa Gil
- Jupiter 8000
- Thomas Leer
- Lumen
- Nimba
- The Nommos
- Ocelot
- Overdream
- Reflex
- Saint Janus
- Space Cat
- Synchro
- Toi Doi
