= Beyond the Infinite =

Studio album by Juno Reactor
- Released: October 1, 1995 (UK); April 17, 1996 (US)
- Genres: Electronic; goa trance; trance
- Length: 67:23
- Labels: Blue Room Released (UK); Hypnotic Records (US)
- Producer: Juno Reactor

Juno Reactor chronology
| Luciana (1994) | Beyond the Infinite (1995) | Bible of Dreams (1997) |

Beyond the Infinite is the third album by multi-genre trance group Juno Reactor. It was released in the United Kingdom on October 1, 1995 through Blue Room Released, and in the United States on April 17, 1996 through Hypnotic Records.

Professional ratings
Review scores
| Source | Rating |
|---|---|
| AllMusic | 2.5/5 |

== Track listing ==
All tracks made by Ben Watkins with collaborators mentioned on the track list.

1. "Guardian Angel" – 7:11 (with Mike Maguire)
2. "Magnetic" – 8:08 (with Paul Jackson)
3. "Ice Cube" – 7:03 (with Paul Jackson, Mike Maguire)
4. "Feel the Universe" – 7:39 (with Johann Bley, Stephen Holweck, Mike Maguire)
5. "Razorback"* – 6:55 (with Mike Maguire, Paul Jackson)
6. "Samurai" – 8:17 (with Johann Bley)
7. "Silver" – 6:36 (with Mike Maguire)
8. "Rotorblade" – 8:19 (with Jens Waldebäck)
9. "Mars" – 7:10 (with Stephen Holweck, Mike Maguire)

* Hypnotic Records (US) release only.

== Samples ==
- The song "Feel the Universe" contains a sample of Kyle MacLachlan murmuring, "I feel the universe functioning perfectly..." This sample is from the 1991 Oliver Stone film The Doors.
- "Rotorblade" contains another Kyle MacLachlan sample ("Some thoughts have a certain sound") from the 1984 David Lynch film Dune.
- "Guardian Angel" contains a sample from the 1968 film The Swimmer of Burt Lancaster saying "If there's anything you want, anything at all... come to me. I'll be your guardian angel."
- "Ice Cube" contains a sample of George Sanders as Mr. Freeze from the original Batman series saying "The ice cube crumbles."
- "Silver" contains samples of the 'monkey chant' segment from the 1992 film Baraka.

== Personnel ==
- Produced by Juno Reactor
- Ben Watkins – producer
- Mike Maguire – co-producer
- Otto The Barbarian – engineering
- Kevin Metcalfe – mastering
- Nahoko Sasada – vocals
- Simon Ghahary – artwork, design
- Simon Watkins – artwork

== Use in other media ==
- "Guardian Angel" is the opening theme of the anime series Texhnolyze. It was used in one of the final battles in the martial arts adventure film Drive, and used in the original theatrical trailer for 1998 films Ring and Spiral.
- "Samurai" was featured in the film and soundtrack to the film Virtuosity starring Denzel Washington.

== See also ==
- Eternity and a Day
- Infinity plus one
- ω+1
