= Jesus Christ Superstars =

Studio album by Laibach
- Released: October 28, 1996
- Genre: Industrial metal; industrial; electronic rock; neoclassical dark wave
- Length: 46:36
- Label: Mute
- Producer: Peter Penko

Laibach chronology
Occupied Nato Tour (1996)	Jesus Christ Superstars (1996)	M.B. December 21, 1984 (1997)

Professional ratings
Review scores
Source	Rating
Allmusic	2/5 stars

Jesus Christ Superstars is the fifth studio album by Slovenian industrial and electronic music group Laibach. Released in 1996 the concept album collects original and cover songs where religion is the central theme. The theme of religion is constructed around Christianity and the title references Andrew Lloyd Webber's rock opera Jesus Christ Superstar.

Unlike the albums before it, Jesus Christ Superstars has a much more guitar driven sound, with the overall result being reminiscent of the bands belonging to the genre of industrial metal.

== Track listing ==
1. "God Is God" (Burton/Watkins) – 3:43
2. "Jesus Christ Superstar" (Lloyd Webber/Rice) – 5:45
3. "Kingdom of God" (Avsenik/Chris Bohn/Laibach) – 5:37
4. "Abuse and Confession" (Avsenik/Chris Bohn/Laibach) – 6:14
5. "Declaration of Freedom" (Chris Bohn/Laibach) – 5:33
6. "Message from the Black Star" (Chris Bohn/Laibach) – 5:50
7. "The Cross" (Prince) – 4:54
8. "To the New Light" (Avsenik/Chris Bohn/Laibach) – 5:00
9. "Deus Ex Machina" (Avsenik/Laibach) – 4:00

"God is God" is a cover of the Juno Reactor song from their album Bible of Dreams (Wax Trax! Records, 1997).

"Jesus Christ Superstar" is a cover of the Andrew Loyd Weber and Tim Rice song from the stage and film musical, "Jesus Christ Superstar".

"The Cross" is a cover of the Prince song.

"To the New Light" is an adaptation of their early song "Brat moj," with a new English translation of the lyrics.
