= Saafi Brothers =

German downtempo music project

The Saafi Brothers are a downtempo music project from Germany, consisting of Gabriel Le Mar and Michael Kohlbecker. They also produce psychedelic trance, dub and ambient music.

The band has seen some success in the chill out spaces at large festivals. The name Saafi is derived from a Sanskrit word meaning "travelling musician". Alex Azary was once a member of the band.

They have released five albums since 1997. Supernatural with strong world music influences was released in 2007. Their fifth album Live on the Roadblog was released as a live recorded album.

== Discography ==
- (1997) Internal Code Error (Blue Room Released)
- (1997) Mystic Cigarettes (Blue Room Released)
- (2000) Midnight's Children (Blue Room Released)
- (2003) Liquid Beach (Secret Life Recordings/Saafi Records)
- (2007) Supernatural
- (2014) Live on the Roadblog (Iboga Records)
- (2017) The Quality of Being One
- (2022) Make Pictures With The Sound (Liquid Sound Design)
- (2025) A Relaxed Blur (Liquid Sound Design)

== See also ==
- List of ambient music artists
