= Simon Ghahary =

Simon Ghahary (born 12 May 1972) is an English born artist, brand architect and lifestyle engineer from the United Kingdom known primarily for his unconventional speaker designs. Inspired by art, nature and technology he refers to his fantastical sculptural pieces as functional art. Developing new forms to accompany new ways of living, he has approached audio product design as an art in and of itself. His aesthetic is not only about the combination of performance and design but the space an object can create when not in use.

== Blue Room loudspeakers ==
In 1992 Ghahary founded Blue Room loudspeakers which was then integrated into B & W Loudspeakers championed by Robert Trunz. This move made the global release of Ghahary's pod designs possible.

== Blue Room Released ==
In 1994 Ghahary founded his music label Blue Room Released with the help of Robert Trunz and Mick Paterson. Globally representing electronic, techno, trance, dub, and breakbeat artists.

== SiFi ==
In an effort to fully realize an eco conscious work/life esthetic, Ghahary began si-fi.com. To design, manufacture and market high fidelity design conscious products to the domestic market, in such a way as to raise the company’s profile, satisfy customers, and contribute to the future well being of the company, industry and consumer is the overreaching goal. The innovative packaging of his minipods and the use of eco friendly ceramics for his Orb 1 speakers, being primary examples of this work ethic.

== Design, branding and marketing ==
In 1991 he designed the Pod Speaker (initially called the House Pod) with the idea that loud speakers performed better in a rounded form than a square box. A chance encounter and subsequent friendship with Bowers & Wilkins engineer Laurence Dickie (who pioneered the Nautilus Speaker) led to the 1993 release of his first Pod Speaker range. Ghahary managed to design the entire seminal Pod range which included the MiniPod, Bass Station, Cinepod, and Micropod

Those products achieved cult status among music and design connoisseurs.

Working as a graphic designer as well, Ghahary produced album cover art work for likes of The Orb and Juno Reactor.

In 2007, he worked as Creative Director for Life Water. At the Raw Coffee Company in the UAE, he managed the brand restructuring (total brand activation), packaging and even the interior of the company headquarters in Dubai.

In 2009-2012, again in the position of Creative Director at Pico International, Ghahary founded the Pico Eco brand identity and initiative under the endorsement of the chairman. There he created all green policies, mandates and brand activation. Working intrinsically with various government agencies and companies such as Lexus.

In February 2010 he became a member of the Board of Directors for the Emirates Green Building Council in Dubai, facilitating its brand development. EmiratesGBC is a professional platform and membership driven organization. It is an independent forum created in 2006 with the goal of advancing green building principles for protecting the environment and promoting sustainability in the Middle East and North Africa.
