= Saafi =

Saafi may refer to:

- Saafi Brothers - psychedelic trance music project from Germany
- Saafi language -language of Senegal
