= Deepak Ram =

South African musician (born 1960)

- Born: 11 May 1960
- Origin: South Africa
- Genres: Hindustani classical music
- Occupations: Composer, flute player, Music producer
- Instrument: bansuri
- Website: www.deepakram.com

Deepak Ram (born 11 May 1960) is a South African-born flautist, composer, keyboard player and producer of Indian origin. Deepak is considered a master of bansuri, an Indian flute of ancient origin made from bamboo. He is a senior disciple of world renowned bansuri maestro Pandit Hariprasad Chaurasia under whom he studied Indian classical music. Deepak's versatile playing and breadth of musical repertoire melds classical and improvisational techniques of Indian Raga, Jazz, Blues and Flamenco into a fusion that has garnered critical acclaim internationally. Deepak was awarded a SAMA (South African Music Award) in 2000 for 'Best Instrumental Album', Searching for Satyam. He has contributed on Shango and Labyrinth albums by the trance group Juno Reactor which was featured as the title soundtrack for The Matrix - Revolutions, Dead Bees on a Cake album by Jazz artist David Sylvian among others.

== Early life ==
Deepak Ram's great-grandparents were brought to South Africa to work on sugar cane plantations as indentured labourers. He was thus born in South Africa to second generation immigrants during the apartheid era in the 60s. A few weeks after his birth the family home in Sophiatown, a racially mixed area, was bulldozed under Group Areas Act for effecting racial segregation in Apartheid South Africa. His family were forcibly resettled in Lenasia - an undeveloped township south of Johannesburg earmarked for those of Indian origin. His earliest influences were the Jazz records his brothers listened to and the Bollywood and Indian music his parents listened to. His first flute was fashioned out of a drainpipe with six holes drilled arbitrarily on the sides.

== Career ==
Deepak Ram first travelled to India at the age of 16 where he received training in classical Indian music under the tutelage renowned flautist Pandit Hariprasad Chaurasia and the late Shri Suryakant Limaye. Before dying, the latter bequeathed a collection of flutes to Ram.

== Discography ==
=== Solo albums ===
- Flute for Thought (1999)
- Searching for Satyam (2000)
- Prasad (Blessing) with Pandit Swapan Chaudhuri (2002)
- Beauty in Diversity (2002)
- Samvad (Conversation) with Ustad Tari Khan (2005)
- One Breath with Pandit Anindo Chatterjee (2007)
- Steps (2008)
- Flute Tales (2013)
- Incandescent (2016)
- Indentured Blue (2020)

=== DVD ===
Live in California with Pandit Anindo Chatterjee (includes interviews with Deepak Ram and Pt. Anindo Chatterjee

=== Production ===
- 'Sun Zara', a debut album by Chinmayi on Worldwide Records label.

=== Contributions ===
- Buddha Bar I
- Buddha Bar III
- Juno Reactor - Shango (2000)
- Dead Bees on a Cake
- Juno Reactor - Labyrinth (2004)
- Civilization VI - India
