= Eternal Basement =

German musician

Eternal Basement was Michael Kohlbecker (21 July 1971 - 21 April 2026), a German trance artist.

== Discography ==
=== Albums ===
- Nerv (Harthouse, 1995)
- Magnet (Blue Room Released, 2000)

=== 12" Releases ===
- Kraft (Harthouse, 1994)
- Taking Place in You (Harthouse, 1994)
- Carpe Noctem (Harthouse, 1995)
- Mind Out (Harthouse, 1995)
- Understood/Raw (Blue Room Released, 1999)
- Vivaldi's Summer/Bach's Toccata & Fugue (Sony Music Media, 2000)
