= Atila (band) =

Spanish progressive rock band

- Origin: Girona, Spain
- Genres: Progressive rock
- Years active: 1973–1978; 1999–present
- Members: Joan Punyet; Benet Nogue; Pere Martinez; Ignasi Bosch; Joan Cardoner
- Past members: Paco Ortega; Eduardo Niebla

Atila is a Spanish progressive rock group of the 1970s, based in Girona. The four-member band released two studio albums and a live album. In 1976 and 1978, they performed at the Canet Rock Festival.

== Band members ==
Current members

- Joan Punyet – drums (1973–1978, 1999–present)
- Benet Nogue – keyboards (1976–1978, 1999–present)
- Pere Martinez – bass (1999–present)
- Ignasi Bosch – guitars (1999–present)
- Joan Cardoner – guitars (1999–present)

Former members

- Paco Ortega – keyboards (1973–1976)
- Eduardo Niebla – guitars (1973–1978)

== Discography ==
- 1975: The Beginning of the End – live album
- 1976: Intención
- 1977: Reviure
- 2024: Encarnacio
