= WAU! Mr. Modo Recordings =

WAU/Mr. Modo Records was a record label set up by Alex Paterson and Youth. "WAU" stands for "What About Us?" (although in a 2016 interview Glover stated that it stood for "weird and unusual") and "Mr. Modo" is Adam Morris, Paterson's manager. They released several early albums by The Orb, that were mainly distributed by record labels such as Big Life. WAU!Mr. Modo Records featured Discomix releases from conscious roots reggae dub sound system artists such as Bim Sherman, Naphtali, Zulu Warriors, Manasseh, Sound Irration, Tena Stelin, as well as many different ambient artists including Sun Electric, Blue Pearl, and Keiichi Suzuki of the Japanese band Moonriders.

Their sublabel, Inter-Modo, also released records from Juno Reactor and The Orb's collaborative side-project FFWD.

== See also ==
- Lists of record labels
