= Luciana (album) =

Studio album by Juno Reactor
- Released: 1994
- Genre: Dark ambient, experimental
- Length: 61:20
- Label: Inter Modo

Juno Reactor chronology
Transmissions (1993)	Luciana (1994)	Beyond the Infinite (1995)

Professional ratings
Review scores
Source	Rating
AllMusic	3/5 stars

Luciana, released in 1994, is the second album by Juno Reactor. It contains only one track, titled "Lu.ci-ana", which runs for 61 minutes and 20 seconds. It differs from Juno Reactor's other releases in that it is a more experimental and dark ambient-focused album, compared to their other psytrance works.
