= Shango (Juno Reactor album) =

Studio album by Juno Reactor
- Released: October 9, 2000 (UK)
- Recorded: Bowl Court Studios, Brownhill Farm Studios
- Genre: Electronic, goa trance, trance, tribal house
- Length: 61:59
- Label: Metropolis Records
- Producer: Juno Reactor

Juno Reactor chronology
| Bible of Dreams (1997) | Shango (2000) | Labyrinth (2004) |

Professional ratings
Review scores
| Source | Rating |
|---|---|
| Allmusic | link |

Shango is the fifth album released by the multi-genre trance group Juno Reactor. The tracks "Pistolero" and "Masters of the Universe" were released as singles.

== Track listing ==
All tracks made by Ben Watkins with collaborators mentioned on the track list.

1. "Pistolero" – 6:13 (co-produced by Steve Stevens)
2. "Hule Lam" – 4:00 (co-produced by Amampondo)
3. "Insects" – 6:18 (co-produced by Mike Maguire)
4. "Badimo" – 7:14 (co-produced by Nick Burton, Mabi Thobejane)
5. "Masters of the Universe" – 6:05 (co-produced by Johann Bley, Mabi Thobejane)
6. "Nitrogen (Part 1)" – 8:34 (co-produced by Alex Paterson, Greg Hunter)
7. "Nitrogen (Part 2)" – 6:26 (co-produced by Stephen Holweck)
8. "Solaris" – 8:58 (co-produced by Deepak Ram)
9. "Song for Ancestors" – 8:09 (co-produced by Taz Alexander, Mabi Thobejane)

== Personnel ==
- Produced by Juno Reactor
- Ben Watkins – producer
- Greg Hunter – engineering
- Otto The Barbarian – engineering
- Richard Edwards – engineering
- Steev Toth – engineering
- Kevin Metcalfe – mastering
- Steve Stevens – guitar (on "Pistolero")
- B.J. Cole – pedal steel guitar
- Pandit Dinesh – tabla
- Boris Salchack – vocals/strings
- Busi Mhlongo – vocals
- Taz Alexander – vocals
- Mike Diver – artwork
- Squalis – artwork
