= The Matrix Reloaded: The Album =

Soundtrack album by Various Artists
- Released: April 29, 2003
- Genres: Electronica, industrial metal, alternative metal, nu metal, alternative rock (Disc 1); Film score (Disc 2)
- Length: 93:28
- Label: Warner Bros. / Maverick
- Producers: Don Gilmore, Linkin Park, Marilyn Manson, Tim Sköld, Rob Zombie, Scott Humphrey, Rob Dougan, Deftones, Terry Date, Howard Benson, Mudrock, Paul Oakenfold, Fluke, Glen Ballard, Don Davis, Juno Reactor

Singles from The Matrix Reloaded: The Album
- 1. "Sleeping Awake" Released: May 26, 2003; 2. "Mona Lisa Overdrive" Released: 2003

Professional ratings
Review scores
Source	Rating
Allmusic	3/5 stars

The Matrix Reloaded: The Album is a 2003 soundtrack album from the 2003 film The Matrix Reloaded. The two-disc album is unusual among soundtrack releases in that it includes separate discs for the film's songs and the score, whereas most films release the songs and the score as separate single-disc albums.

The album's lead single was "Sleeping Awake" by P.O.D. The song's lyrics and video refer to elements of the film.

== Track listing ==
Disc 1
No.	Title	Writer(s)	Producer(s)	Length
1.	"Session" (Linkin Park)	Linkin Park	Don Gilmore; Linkin Park	2:23
2.	"This Is the New Shit" (Marilyn Manson)	Marilyn Manson; John 5; Tim Skold	Marilyn Manson; Tim Skold; Ben Grosse (co.)	4:19
3.	"Reload" (Rob Zombie)	Rob Zombie; Scott Humphrey	Scott Humphrey; Rob Zombie	4:25
4.	"Furious Angels" (Rob Dougan)	Rob Dougan	Rob Dougan; Pete Craigie (add.)	5:29
5.	"Lucky You" (Deftones)	Deftones	Terry Date; Deftones	4:08
6.	"The Passportal" (Team Sleep)	Chino Moreno	Terry Date	2:55
7.	"Sleeping Awake" (P.O.D.)	P.O.D.	Howard Benson	3:23
8.	"Bruises" (Ünloco)	Ünloco	Mudrock	2:36
9.	"Calm Like a Bomb" (Rage Against the Machine)	Zack de la Rocha; Tim Commerford; Tom Morello; Brad Wilk		4:58
10.	"Dread Rock" (Oakenfold)	Paul Oakenfold; Ian Green	Paul Oakenfold	4:39
11.	"Zion" (Fluke)	Fluke	Fluke	4:33
12.	"When the World Ends (Oakenfold Remix)" (Dave Matthews Band)	David J. Matthews; Glen Ballard	Glen Ballard	5:26

Disc 2
No.	Title	Writer(s)	Producer(s)	Length
1.	"Main Title" (Don Davis)	Don Davis	Don Davis	1:30
2.	"Trinity Dream" (Don Davis)	Don Davis	Don Davis	1:56
3.	"Teahouse" (Juno Reactor)	Ben Watkins; Gocoo	Juno Reactor	1:04
4.	"Chateau" (Rob Dougan)	Rob Dougan	Rob Dougan	3:23
5.	"Mona Lisa Overdrive" (Juno Reactor)	Ben Watkins	Juno Reactor; Don Davis (co.)	10:08
6.	"Burly Brawl" (Juno Reactor vs. Don Davis)	Ben Watkins; Don Davis	Juno Reactor; Don Davis (co.)	5:52
7.	""Matrix Reloaded" Suite" (Don Davis)	Don Davis	Don Davis	17:34

== Omitted cues ==
Don Davis wrote three cues which were ultimately unused in the final film. The first is an alternate of the "Burly Brawl theme," which lasts for 1:31. The second, "Multiple Replication," was used, but it was combined with a choir as well as composition by Juno Reactor. The third, "Chateau Swashbuckling," was almost completely omitted in favor of Rob Dougan's track, although the final few seconds were retained in the film. The following cue, "Double Trouble," which accompanies the scene in which the Twins chase the Keymaker, Morpheus and Trinity through the Merovingian's chateau, was altered to feature the beat track from Oakenfold's "Dread Rock."

The track "Mona Lisa Overdrive" was used in 2004 by rhythmic gymnast Anna Bessonova of Ukraine for her club routine, as well in 2008 by Eleni Andriola in her hoop routine.

== Charts ==
=== Weekly charts ===
Chart (2003)	Peak position
Australian Albums (ARIA)	7
Austrian Albums (Ö3 Austria)	2
Belgian Albums (Ultratop Flanders)	7
Belgian Albums (Ultratop Wallonia)	10
Canadian Albums (Billboard)	2
Danish Albums (Hitlisten)	22
Dutch Albums (Album Top 100)	12
Finnish Albums (Suomen virallinen lista)	10
French Albums (SNEP)	9
German Albums (Offizielle Top 100)	5
Hungarian Albums (MAHASZ)	8
New Zealand Albums (RMNZ)	5
Norwegian Albums (VG-lista)	6
Spanish Albums (AFYVE)	12
Swedish Albums (Sverigetopplistan)	22
Swiss Albums (Schweizer Hitparade)	1
US Billboard 200	5
US Soundtrack Albums (Billboard)	1

=== Year-end charts ===
Chart (2003)	Position
Austrian Albums (Ö3 Austria)	74
French Albums (SNEP)	154
German Albums (Offizielle Top 100)	91
Swiss Albums (Schweizer Hitparade)	42
US Billboard 200	132
US Soundtrack Albums (Billboard)	9

== Certifications ==
Region	Certification	Certified units/sales
Australia (ARIA)	Gold	35,000^{^}
United Kingdom (BPI)	Gold	100,000^{^}
United States (RIAA)	Gold	500,000^{^}
^{^} Shipments figures based on certification alone.
