= Steven A. Davis =

New Zealand stunt man and actor

Steven A. Davis is a New Zealand stunt man and actor.

Davis is known for his role of Gordy Leach in This Is Not My Life, and for playing Jayden's father on Power Rangers Samurai. In 2003 he wrote, produced, and acted in The Fanimatrix: Run Program, and worked as stuntman in the filming of The Hobbit: An Unexpected Journey. The Fanimatrix has attracted a cult following, and by October 2003 had been downloaded 70,000 times and as of year 2023 is considered the oldest media being actively shared in the torrent network, being shared for 20 consecutive years, becoming a pivotal part of internet history.

== Filmography ==
=== Television ===
- Legend of the Seeker (2 episodes, 2008) as Guard
- Power Rangers R.P.M. (3 episodes, 2009) as City Guard / Mayor's Son / Thug
- Go Girls (1 episode, 2010) as Campbell
- This Is Not My Life (11 episodes, 2010) as Gordy Leach
- Spartacus: Gods of the Arena (3 episodes, 2011) as Indus
- Power Rangers Samurai (1 episode, 2011) as Jayden's Father

=== Film ===
- The Fanimatrix: Run Program (2003) as Dante
- Big Bad Wolves (2006) as Big Bad Wolf, Prince Charming

=== Stunts ===
- Vertical Limit (2000)
- Power Rangers R.P.M. (2009)
- Spartacus: Blood and Sand (4 episodes, 2010)
- The Warrior's Way (2010)
