= Transmissions (Juno Reactor album) =

Studio album by Juno Reactor
- Released: 1993
- Genres: Electronic, trance, goa trance
- Length: 65:56
- Label: NovaMute Records
- Producer: Juno Reactor

Juno Reactor chronology
Transmissions (1993)	Luciana (1994)

Transmissions is the 1993 debut album by the multi-genre trance group Juno Reactor.

== Track lists ==
1. "High Energy Protons" (Watkins, Maguire) – 6:33
2. "The Heavens" (Watkins, Holweck) – 6:27
3. "Luna-Tic" (Watkins, Waldeback) – 9:01
4. "Contact" (Watkins, Holweck) – 5:53
5. "Acid Moon" (Watkins, Waldeback) – 8:39
6. "10,000 Miles" (Watkins, Holweck) – 5:55
7. "Laughing Gas" (Watkins, Holweck) – 8:05
8. "Man to Ray" (Watkins, Maguire, Holweck) – 6:43
9. "Landing" (Watkins, Waldeback, Maguire) – 8:42

== Samples ==
- On "High Energy Protons": "Everything is going extremely well. You are the brain and central nervous system" is from the film 2001: A Space Odyssey.
- On "High Energy Protons": "High energy protons spilling over into our atmosphere" is spoken by the character Marina in the film Local Hero in reference to the aurora borealis.
- On "Man to Ray": "He know the moon, he know the stars, he know the Milky Way" is taken from a scene set at a NASA radio relay station in the Australian Outback, in the film The Right Stuff.
- On "Luna-Tic": "I was walking on the moon one day…" is the voice of astronaut Harrison Schmitt during a moonwalk on the Apollo 17 lunar mission in December 1972.

== Personnel ==
- Mari Naylor - Vocals (2)
- Annie Fontaine - Vocals (6)

== Credits ==
- All tracks produced and mixed by Juno Reactor
- Engineered by Otto the Barbarian, assisted by Nahoko Sadada
- Edit man Neal Snyman

== Release history ==
NovaMute Records: 1993, NOMU24CD
