= Bible of Dreams =

Studio album by Juno Reactor
- Released: June 18, 1997 (US), August 12, 1997 (UK)
- Genre: Goa trance, world
- Length: 66:08
- Label: Wax Trax! Records/TVT Records
- Producer: Juno Reactor

Juno Reactor chronology
Beyond the Infinite (1995)	Bible of Dreams (1997)	Shango (2000)

Bible of Dreams is the fourth album released by the multi-genre trance group Juno Reactor. The song "God Is God" was covered by Laibach for their album Jesus Christ Superstars (Mute Records) in 1996.

== Track listing ==
All tracks made by Ben Watkins with collaborators mentioned on the track list.

1. "Jardin De Cecile" – 7:03 (with Mike Maguire, Paul Jackson, Xavier)
2. "Conga Fury" – 8:06 (with Amampondo)
3. "God Is God" – 6:46 (with Nick Burton, Natacha Atlas)
4. "Komit" – 8:12 (with Mike Maguire, Paul Jackson)
5. "Swamp Thing" – 5:12 (with Johann Bley, Mike Maguire)
6. "Kaguya Hime" – 6:41 (with Mike Maguire, Nick Burton)
7. "Children of the Night" – 7:57 (with Johann Bley, Mike Maguire)
8. "Shark" – 9:37 (with Nick Burton)
9. "High Energy Protons (Orion Mix)" – 6:28 (with Mike Maguire, Paul Jackson. Bonus track on some releases)

== Samples in "God Is God" ==
The song "God Is God" contains samples from Cecil B. DeMille's film The Ten Commandments, of Charlton Heston proclaiming, "...you shall see hail fall from a clear sky ...you shall see darkness... God is God..." The music video uses footage from The Color of Pomegranates. Also in the beginning of the song one can hear a sample from "Prituri se planinata" (worldwide hit of 1994) performed by Stefka Sabotinova, a renowned Bulgarian folk singer.

== Film and TV appearances ==
- "Conga Fury" appears in the film Mortal Kombat Annihilation during the fight between Liu Kang and Jade, as well as in its soundtrack. A slightly different version of the song titled "Conga Fury (Animatrix edit)" appears on soundtrack to the animation anthology film Animatrix. The song opens the segment "Final Flight of the Osiris" when the two main characters are engaged in a sword fight in the virtual reality.
- "Komit" appears in the film The Matrix Reloaded at the beginning when Neo flies through the city to see The Oracle. The song is mixed with additional score, composed by Don Davis, but it is not part of the soundtrack. It also can be heard in the 12th episode from the second season of the television series La Femme Nikita in a club scene.
- "God Is God" can be heard in the 1999 film Beowulf.

== Personnel ==
- Produced by Juno Reactor
- Ben Watkins – producer
- Kevin Metcalfa – mastering
- Otto the Barbarian – engineering
- Carey Robinson – assistant engineering
- MadArk, London – artwork
- Mabi – African drums/percussion, congas
- Jean-Luc – Prophet 5 synthesizer
- Bronwyn Lee – vocals ("Conga Fury")
- Natacha Atlas – vocals ("God Is God")
- Wolfgang (5) – spoken vocals ("God Is God", "Children of the Night")
- Stephane Holweck – bass guitar
- Pete Glenister – slide guitar
- Mzwandile – percussion
- Yapo & Harn – vocals ("Kaguya Hime")
