= Ocelot (musician) =

American record producer and DJ (born 1974)

OCELOT
- Also known as: oCeLoT; Vector Selector
- Born: Aaron Peacock; 1974 (age 51–52)
- Origin: San Francisco, California, U.S.
- Genres: Psychedelic trance
- Years active: 2001–present
- Labels: Many labels, currently http://revoltdigital.co.uk/label/ocelot-music/
- Members: aaron peacock
- Past members: aaron peacock
- Website: http://ocelotmusic.com/

Ocelot, stylized oCeLoT (born Aaron Peacock; 1974) is an American record producer and DJ. He has been producing music since 1993 (featuring releases on Journees Music 1995 "Blue Spotted Frog" ep as Aaron Peacock) and has released material on Dropout Productions, Vertigo Records, Ceiba Records, Avatar Records, Insomnia Records, Zaikadelic Records, Ektoplazm.com, and many more. Featuring a discography of eight albums and more than 100 singles. He produces a Progressive Goa project called Prog-A-Lot, various Techno and House projects (Peacock, Aaron Peacock...), and Drum & Bass / Breaks as NeuroTransmitterz.

oCeLoT has toured over 55 countries and played on festivals like Boom, Ozora, Soulclipse, 303, Space of Joy, Full-Moon, Vuuv, and Transcendence.

== Interviews ==
- June 2015 interview at Psytrance.pl
- March 2007 interview at Caffix
- Original interview in Spanish at Caffix Productions
