= M.B. December 21, 1984 =

Live album by Laibach
- Released: 1997
- Recorded: 21 December 1984; 26 April 1985
- Venue: Malči Belič Hall; Ljubljana, Slovenia; Kulušić; Zagreb, Croatia
- Genre: Industrial

Laibach chronology
| Jesus Christ Superstars (1996) | M.B. December 21, 1984 (1997) | The John Peel Sessions (2002) |

M.B. December 21, 1984 is a live album by Slovenian industrial pioneers Laibach. The album was recorded on 21 December 1984 at Malči Belič Hall in Ljubljana, Slovenia and on 26 April 1985 at Kulušić in Zagreb, Croatia, both then part of the former Yugoslavia. It was released in 1997 by The Grey Area, a sublabel of Mute Records.

The part of the album recorded in Ljubljana was taken from a concert dedicated to the deceased former member Tomaž Hostnik. It was held in secret due to the band being banned from using the name Laibach.

== Critical reception ==
NME gave the album one out of ten stars, calling Laibach an "unconscionable crock of old cobblers".

Professional ratings
Review scores
| Source | Rating |
|---|---|
| New Musical Express | 1/10 stars |

== Track listing ==
All tracks written and performed by Laibach, except #7, written and performed by Josip Broz Tito

1. Sodba Veka (The Judgement Of The Century)
2. Ti, Ki Izzivas (You, Who Are Challenging)
3. Sila/Dokumenti (The Force/Documents)
4. Sredi Bojev (In The Midst Of Struggles)
5. Nova Akropola (The New Acropolis)
6. Dokumenti II (Documents II)
7. Tito
8. Dokumenti III (Documents III)
9. Dokumenti IV (Documents IV)
