= The Matrix Revolutions (soundtrack) =

The Matrix Revolutions: Music from the Motion Picture

Soundtrack album by Don Davis
- Released: November 4, 2003
- Recorded: at The Newman Scoring Stage, 20th Century-Fox Studios
- Genres: Soundtrack, film score
- Length: 66:02
- Label: Warner Bros./Maverick
- Producers: Don Davis (Tracks 1–3, 5–15), Juno Reactor (co-producer on Tracks 2–3, 16), Pale 3 (Track 4)

Singles from The Matrix Revolutions: Music from the Motion Picture
- 1. "Navras" Released: 2003

Professional ratings
Review scores
Source	Rating
Allmusic	3/5 stars

The Matrix Revolutions: Music from the Motion Picture is a 2003 soundtrack album from the film, The Matrix Revolutions.

== Track listing ==
1. "The Matrix Revolutions Main Title" by Don Davis – 1:21
2. "The Trainman Cometh" by Juno Reactor/Don Davis – 2:43
3. "Tetsujin" (iron man) by Juno Reactor/Don Davis – 3:21
4. "In My Head" by Pale 3 – 3:46
5. "The Road to Sourceville" by Don Davis – 1:25
6. "Men in Metal" by Don Davis – 2:18
7. "Niobe's Run" by Don Davis – 2:48
8. "Woman Can Drive" by Don Davis – 2:41
9. "Moribund Mifune" by Don Davis – 3:47
10. "Kidfried" by Don Davis – 4:49
11. "Saw Bitch Workhorse" by Don Davis – 3:59
12. "Trinity Definitely" by Don Davis – 4:15
13. "Neodämmerung" (Neo's dusk) by Don Davis – 5:59
14. "Why, Mr. Anderson?" by Don Davis – 6:10
15. "Spirit of the Universe" by Don Davis – 4:51
16. "Navras" by Juno Reactor vs. Don Davis – 9:08

The track "Navras" was used by rhythmic gymnasts Simona Peycheva of Bulgaria and Penelope Blackmore of Australia in their respective ribbon routines at the 2004 Athens Olympic Games.
