= The Fanimatrix =

2003 Fan film based on The Matrix

- Directed by: Rajneel Singh
- Written by: Steven A. Davis; Rajneel Singh
- Produced by: Steven A. Davis; Rajneel Singh
- Starring: Steven A. Davis; Farrah Lipsham; Fasitua Amosa; Vaughan Beckley; Mike Edward
- Cinematography: Rajneel Singh
- Edited by: Rajneel Singh
- Music by: Don Davis; Andy Hunter
- Distributed by: Plutonian Shore Productions; Absolute O Productions
- Release date: 27 September 2003
- Running time: 16 minutes
- Country: New Zealand
- Language: English
- Budget: $800 NZD

The Fanimatrix (full title The Fanimatrix: Run Program) is a science fiction/action fan film and short film based on The Matrix, released on the Internet on 27 September 2003, written and directed by Steven A. Davis and Rajneel Singh. It stars Steven A. Davis, Farrah Lipsham, Fasitua Amosa, and Vaughan Beckley. Its name is a deliberate pun using the title The Animatrix and the term fan film.

== Plot ==
The short film is set within the Matrix universe, shortly before the discovery of "The One" (in The Matrix). It tells a story of two rebels, Dante and Medusa, operating out of a ship the Descartes, and of their fateful mission onto the virtual world of the Matrix.

The film opens with the insertion of Dante and Medusa into the Matrix. They materialize inside a machine shop and quickly move across the city while talking to their Operator, who is guiding them on their mission. The night's objectives are simple: Medusa is to break into a high-security building in order to steal important data. Dante is to provide a distraction so the Matrix will not discover Medusa's presence.

Dante heads for a particularly rough nightclub populated with cyberpunks and goths. After dispatching the two bouncers, he quickly picks a fight with two goths who mock Dante's "normal" appearance. The Operator — who is in constant contact with Dante via his cellphone — helps coordinate the fight so it coincides with Medusa breaking into the high-security building and taking out a team of security officers.

The nightclub brawl culminates with Dante delivering a superhuman kick to one of goths, which alerts the Matrix. The system promptly dispatches an Agent to take care of the situation and it begins chasing Dante. He leads the Agent on a dangerous wild goose chase across the city, keeping Medusa free to accomplish her task.

Their mission goes awry. A security officer, missed by Medusa during her entry, discovers her presence and hits the alarm, so she must flee. Dante's goose chase now becomes a frantic dash to get to an exit point — the nearest being the machine shop they first appeared in, but he is unable to elude the Agent.

Dante is trapped, and Medusa is out of time. He realises he must fight the Agent — even though it means certain death — in order to buy time for Medusa to escape with the information she acquired. He tells the Operator to get Medusa out and then, chanting the mantra "free my mind" to himself, he throws himself at the Agent. During an epic kung fu fight he is able to hold off the Agent until he sees an opportunity to escape. He decides, though, to not race to freedom, but continues the fight until he is eventually thrown against the machinery and his chest is pierced by a steel pipe, killing him.

As Dante dies, Medusa reaches safety, unaware of Dante's immense sacrifice for her own life.

== Production ==
The Fanimatrix was filmed in New Zealand. With an estimated budget of NZ$800 (US$465), most of which spent on wardrobe and props, the fan film was shot on a single CCD Sony camcorder on DV tape. Using guerrilla filmmaking techniques, the film-makers worked over the course of nine nights to finish the project. The fight sequences were choreographed using the same wushu martial arts used in the feature films. The final product was edited on Adobe Premiere, After Effects and AlamDV Special FX, and premiered online on 27 September 2003, distributed via BitTorrent, Kazaa and the eDonkey network. As of 2023, it is the oldest torrent file still being actively distributed.

== Cast ==
- Steven A. Davis as Dante
- Farrah Lipsham as Medusa
- Fasitua Amosa as The Operator
- Vaughan Beckley as The Agent
- Mike Edward as Bald Goth
- Chris Rigby as Contact Juggling Goth
- Ben Butler-Hogg as Bouncer #1
- Louis MacAllister as Bouncer #2
- Andrew Salisbury as Security Guard #1
- David Fraser as Security Guard #2
- Dominic Skinner as Security Guard #3
- Matt Bennett as Crow
- Eden Phillips as Pedestrian
