= Frédéric Holyszewski =

French music producer born 1970

Frederic Holyszewski
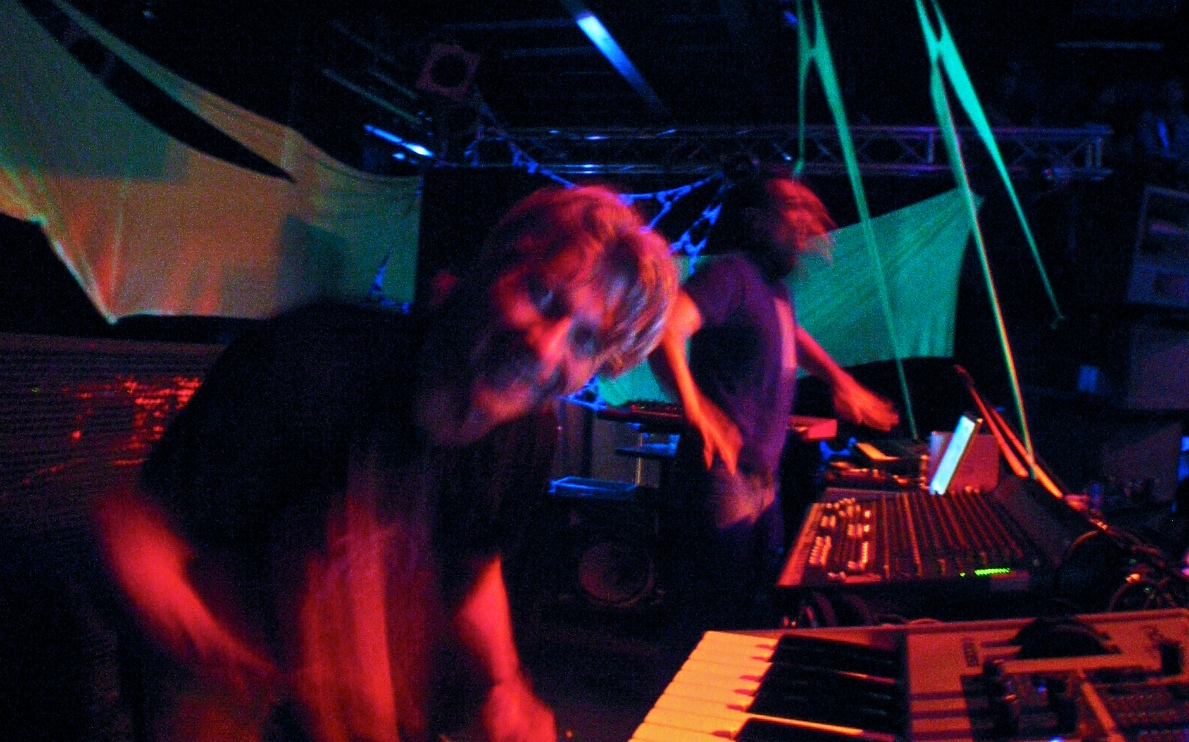
- Transwave performing – Holyszewski to the right

Background information
- Also known as: Dado, Deedrah, Federico Baltimore, Synthetic, Transwave, Krome Angels
- Born: Frédéric Holyszewski; March 9, 1970 (age 55)
- Origin: Melun, France
- Genres: EDM, psychedelic trance, Goa trance, downtempo
- Occupation(s): DJ, Producer, Sound Engineer
- Years active: 1995–present
- Labels: HOMmega Productions

Frédéric Holyszewski (Paris, 1970), also known as Dado and Deedrah, is a French music producer mostly known for psytrance projects such as Deedrah, Transwave, and Synthetic.

== Biography ==
Holyszewski learned classical music since his childhood, playing piano and transverse flute, yet wanted to be a biology teacher. He got a master's degree in biology and geology (PARIS 6) but stopped his studies when he was 25 years old to produce music.

In 1994, with Christophe Drouillet aka Absolum, Holyszewski formed psytrance group Transwave. In 1996 they released debut album Helium, which received a 4* review in Muzik magazine. The duo made an impact on the genre, in particular for their live performances, and by 1997 had become known as "scene stalwarts".

Holyszewski has been releasing trance productions under the name Deedrah since 1995, including albums such as Self Oscillation in 1997 and Reload in 2001. The latter received a positive review in Muzik magazine caveated by a hint of "monotony" in the music. He also releases house tracks under the name of Federico Baltimore. In 2004 a remix of his track "Reload" was featured on the soundtrack of the movie Man on Fire. Holyszewski also composes music for PlayStation video games, for example Gran Turismo 4 in 2004 which featured two of his tracks under the "Synthetic" alias.

== Discography ==
- Helium (1996; Matsuri) - as Transwave
- Self Oscillation (1997; Distance /Questionmark records) – as Deedrah
- Reload (2001; Hadshot) – as Deedrah
- Body & Soul (spun rds)
- Far and Away (2001; Hadshot Haheizar)
- Out Of Control (2012; HOMmega Productions)
- Vertigo (2014; United Beats Records)
