= Hux Flux =

Swedish psytrance producer (1974–2018)

- Born: Dennis Rickard Tapper; November 18, 1974
- Origin: Sweden
- Died: May 15, 2018 (aged 43)
- Genres: Psychedelic trance, Goa trance
- Years active: 1998–2018
- Labels: Koyote, Spiral Trax, Avatar/ProFile, Z-Plane

Dennis Rickard Tapper (18 November 1974 – 15 May 2018), known professionally as Hux Flux, was a Swedish psychedelic trance producer. His music blended Goa and psytrance aesthetics with an effects-driven, mechanical sound that became influential in the late 1990s and early 2000s.

== Career ==
Tapper began producing after attending forest parties near Örebro, Sweden, forming Hux Flux in 1998. Early singles included “Time Slices / Perceptor”, followed by the debut album Cryptic Crunch (1999) on Koyote Records, later remastered by Avatar/ProFile. He subsequently worked with Henric Fietz, resulting in tracks such as “Idiot” and “Bring Your Own BIOS”.

A second album, Division by Zero (2003), appeared on Spiral Trax, and a third, Circle Sine Sound (2015), was released on Z-Plane Records.

Tapper also co-founded the psydub/ambient project Illuminus with Magnus Holte, releasing the album Sweep Dreams (2015) on Z-Plane Records.

On 15 May 2018, Tapper died after an accidental drowning in a lake near his home. He was 43.

== Discography ==
=== Albums ===
- Cryptic Crunch (Koyote Records, 1999; remastered Avatar/ProFile, 2006)
- Division by Zero (Spiral Trax, 2003)
- Circle Sine Sound (Z-Plane Records, 2015)

=== Selected singles and EPs ===
- “Time Slices / Perceptor” (Koyote Records, 1998).
- “Motor / S.T.P. Something” (Koyote Records, 1998–1999).
- “Reflux / Java Junkies” (with Palombini Power; Spiral Trax, 1999).
- “Lex Rex Perplex / Errorhead” (Spiral Trax, 2000).

== Legacy ==
Cryptic Crunch is frequently cited as a classic of late-90s psytrance and a precursor to later forest-psy sounds.
