= Mona Lisa Overdrive (song) =

Song by Juno Reactor and Don Davis

from the album The Matrix Reloaded: The Album and Labyrinth
- Released: 29 April 2003 (soundtrack); 26 October 2004 (album)
- Studio: The Paramour, Fox Soundstage and O'Henry's in Los Angeles; Ridge Farm Studio in Rusper, West Sussex
- Genre: Goa trance; film score
- Length: 10:08 (soundtrack version); 4:45 (album version)
- Songwriter: Ben Watkins
- Producers: Ben Watkins; Don Davis

"Mona Lisa Overdrive" is a composition in B-flat minor, featured in the movie The Matrix Reloaded, during the highway chase scene. It is written by Don Davis in collaboration with the electronica act Juno Reactor, representing a blend of film score music and trance. The track is the fifth entry in the second CD in the film soundtrack, released on 15 May 2003. A different version of the song is featured in Juno Reactor's 2004 album, Labyrinth. A remix of the song was produced by Thomas P. Heckmann and was included on the group's remix album Inside the Reactor in 2011. In April 2026, the track was reimagined by Reaky Reason.

The song title is derived from William Gibson's cyberpunk novel of the same name, published in 1988. The Matrix franchise was heavily influenced by Gibson's writing.

== Personnel ==
- Don Davis – conductor, orchestration
- Taz Alexander – vocals
- Scarlet – guitar
- Greg Ellis – percussion
- Mabi Thobejane – percussion
- Mike Fisher – percussion
- Zig Gron – editing
- Greg Hunter – engineer
- Scott Oyster – engineer
