= Total Eclipse (French band) =

French psychedelic trance band

Total Eclipse Official
- Origin: Bordeaux France
- Genres: Goa trance, psychedelic trance, psybient
- Years active: 1992–present
- Labels: Dragonfly Records, T.I.P. Records, Blue Room Released
- Members: Stéphane Holweck; Marios Makar
- Past members: Serge Souque; Loïc Van Poucke
- Website: Official website

Total Eclipse is a psychedelic trance band founded in 1992 by three French musicians: Stéphane Holweck, Serge Souque and Loïc Vanpoucke. Stéphane Holweck is now the sole member. Their first tracks appeared on a few compilations in 1993, and by 1994 they had a few singles out with Dragonfly Records and T.I.P. Records. Their first full-length album, Delta Aquarids, and the double CD Violent Relaxation were released in 1995 and 1996 respectively, both on Blue Room Released. They also had a single song, "Psychedelic Terrorist", on the album Tsunami, released in 1999.

== Releases ==
Total Eclipse has produced five albums: Delta Aquarids (1995), Violent Relaxation (1996), Access Denied (1999), Update Files (2004), and Tales of the Shaman (2010). Access Denied received a three-star rating from AllMusic.

Holweck continues to perform; he has played at events in several countries, including Brazil, Hungary, Portugal, Japan, Turkey, France, and the United States.

Total Eclipse has remixed tracks by such artists as Anne Clark, Gong, Juno Reactor, Jungle High, 1200 Mics, and Prana. Their extensive discography includes tracks released on Blue Room Released, TIP, Dragonfly, Twisted Records, Avatar Records, Solstice, Wagram Music, Sony Music, Phonokol, Eye Q, 3D Vision, and Nova Tekk.

== Discography ==
- Delta Aquarids (1995, Blue Room Released)
- Violent Relaxation (1996, Blue Room Released)
- Access Denied (1999, Blue Room Released)
- Violent Relaxation (2003, Avatar Records, Re-Release in Israel)
- Update Files (2004, Arcadia Music)
- Tales of the Shaman (2010, Mandala Records)
