= Dado (street performer) =

DADO
- Also known as: Mon Oncle le bossu
- Born: Daniel Warr; Montreal, Quebec, Canada
- Genres: Character Clown
- Occupations: Street performer, Magician, Clown
- Years active: 1997–present

Daniel Warr, also known as Mon Oncle le bossu or DADO, is a Canadian street performer, magician and clown. He was born in Montreal, Quebec, and raised in Edmonton, Alberta.

He has been performing professionally under the stage name DADO for the past 14 years, with a repertoire of clown, magic and mime. Mostly self-taught in the arts of Vaudevillian performance, he has trained with the likes of Daniel Stein, Bob Burke, Jeff Raz, and Tony Montanaro. His interest in performance began early inspired by Mr. Willard of Willard's house of magic, he soon had his first "job" where he was discovered by The Greamizian Brothers who offered a job at the entertainment department at The West Edmonton Mall.

== Career ==
Since 1997, DADO has been performing and traveling over the world thru the Netherlands, Belgium, Germany, France, Switzerland, Denmark, Sweden, Austria, Australia, New Zealand, Canada, and The United States. DADO is not only a street performer he has performer throughout Europe in Varietè shows, Theater Festivals and has many cabaret and stage routines in his repertoire. Using physical comedy and his skills as one of the best balloon sculptors in the field DADO, has created a character-based clown show that is both stylistic and innovative. In 2001 he began development of Mon-Oncle le bossu clown character which debuted at The Edmonton Street Performers Festival 2003. In 2009 he premiered his newest show "The Hunchback Ballet" at the Belgian showcase festival in Ieper, "City of Wings".
