= Mitsuru =

- Gender: Both

Origin
- Origin: Japanese
- Meaning: Different meanings depending on the kanji used

Mitsuru (みつる, ミツル) is a unisex Japanese given name. Notable people with the name include:

== Written forms ==
Forms in kanji can include:

- 充, "full/fullness"
- 満, "grow/raise"
- 光流, "light flow"

== People with the name ==
- Mitsuru Adachi (あだち 充; born 1951), Japanese manga author
- Mitsuru Chiyotanda (千代反田 充; born 1980), Japanese professional football defender
- Mitsuru Fukikoshi (吹越 満; born 1965), Japanese actor
- Mitsuru Hattori (はっとり みつる; born 1977), pen-name of a Japanese manga author
- Mitsuru Hirata (平田 満; born 1953), Japanese actor
- Mitsuru Hongo (本郷 みつる; born 1959), Japanese film director
- Mitsuru Hotta (堀田 満; 1935–2015), Japanese botanist
- Mitsuru Igarashi (五十嵐 充; born 1969), former keyboardist and songwriter
- Mitsuru Ishihara (石原 満; born 1969), Japanese animator
- Mitsuru Karahashi (唐橋 充; born 1977), Japanese actor for TV Asahi
- Mitsuru Kimura (木村 満; born 1970), Japanese rower
- Mitsuru Komaeda (古前田 充; born 1950), Japanese football player
- Mitsuru Kono (河野 満; born 1946), Japanese table tennis player
- Mitsuru Mansho (満生 充; born 1989), Japanese football player
- Mitsuru Matsui (松井 充; born 1961), Japanese cryptographer
- Mitsuru Matsumura (松村 充; born 1957), Japanese figure skater
- Mitsuru Meike (女池 充; born 1969), Japanese film director, screenwriter, and actor
- Mitsuru Miura (三浦 みつる; born 1954), Japanese manga author
- Mitsuru Miyamoto (宮本 充; born 1958), Japanese voice actor
- Mitsuru Nagata (永田 充; born 1983), Japanese football player
- Mitsuru Nakamura (中村 満; born 1978), Japanese artist and poet
- Mitsuru Ogata (小形 満; born 1961), male voice actor from Aomori Prefecture affiliated with Mausu Promotion
- Mitsuru Sakurai (桜井 充; born 1956), Japanese politician
- Mitsuru Sato (佐藤 満; born 1961), Japanese wrestler and Olympic champion
- Mitsuru Sugaya (すがや みつる; born 1950), Japanese manga author
- Mitsuru Ushijima (牛島 満; 1887–1945), Japanese general who fought at the Battle of Okinawa during World War 2
- Mitsuru Yoshida (吉田 満; 1923–1979), Japanese author and naval officer
- Mitsuru Yūki (結城 光流), female Japanese novelist

== Fictional characters ==
- Mitsuru, character from the Fruit Baskets anime
- Mitsuru Ihara, character from the Food Fight TV series
- Mitsuru Kirijo, character from Persona 3
- Mitsuru Numai, character from the Battle Royale anime.
- Mitsuru Sano, character from the tokusatsu series Kamen Rider Ryuki
- Mitsuru Suou, character from the Crescent Moon manga
- Mitsuru Tenma, character from the Ensemble Stars! game

== See also ==
- 6091 Mitsuru, main-belt asteroid
