= Gods & Monsters (Juno Reactor album) =

Studio album by Juno Reactor
- Released: 2008
- Genre: Electronic
- Length: 57:09
- Label: Metropolis

Juno Reactor chronology
Labyrinth (2004)	Gods & Monsters (2008)	Inside the Reactor (2011)

Professional ratings
Review scores
Source	Rating
Blogcritics	(positive)
Popmatters	8/10 stars
ReGen	4/5 stars

Gods & Monsters is the seventh album by the electronic/trance band Juno Reactor. The album was released on April 22, 2008, though Metropolis began shipping it in early April.

== Track listing ==
1. "Inca Steppa" – 7:45
2. "Tokyo Dub" – 7:07
3. "Las Vegas Future Past" – 5:59
4. "Mind of the Free" – 6:10
5. "Immaculate Crucifixion" – 7:40
6. "City of the Sinful" – 4:43
7. "Tanta Pena" – 5:50
8. "The Perfect Crime (Superman)" – 6:24
9. "Pretty Girl" – 5:27

Two tracks in the album are remixes of tracks originally from the video game The Matrix: Path of Neo. A soundtrack was planned for release in January 2006, but was delayed until March 2006, before the soundtrack release was scrapped. The two tracks are:

- "City of the Sinful" was originally used in the video game as "Ever Had a Dream?"
- "Immaculate Crucifixion" was originally "Multiple Smiths", the track played during the Burly Brawl.

== Personnel ==
- Artwork Design - Squalis
- Artwork Illustration - Koji Morimoto
- Bass - Dr. Das
- Drum Programming - Ramjac
- Drum Programming, Guitar, Keyboards, Engineer - Ben Watkins
- Additional Drums - Django
- Drums, Percussion - Greg Ellis, Mabi Thobejane
- Engineer - Adz, Chris Lewis
- Guitar - Sugizo
- Keyboards - Scarlet
- Sonar - Rudy Koppl
- Sound Forager - Xavier Morel
- Piano - Mike Garson
- Trumpet in Las Vegas Future Past - Byron Wallen
- Guitar in City Of The Sinful - Steve Stevens
- Darduk Flute, ney and zorn in Tanta Pena - Tigran Aleksanyan
- Acoustic guitar in Perfect Crime - Eduardo Niebla
- Vocals in Perfect Crime and Pretty Girl - Ben Watkins
- Vocals in Inca Steppa, Tokyo Dub, Mind Of The Free and City Of The Sinful - Ghetto Priest
- Female vocals in Inca Steppa, Perfect Crime and Pretty Girl - Taz Alexander
- Vocals in City Of The Sinful - Angelica
- Vocals in Tanta Pena - Yasmin Levy
- Written-By, Producer - Juno Reactor
