= Eduardo Niebla =

- Born: 1955 (age 69–70); Tangier, Morocco
- Origin: Girona, Catalonia, Spain
- Genres: Flamenco; classical; jazz; progressive rock
- Occupation: Musician
- Instrument: Guitar
- Years active: 1975–present
- Website: www.eduardoniebla.com

Eduardo Niebla is a Spanish guitarist. Besides his work with jazz and Spanish flamenco guitar, he has collaborated with trance group Juno Reactor and early in his career played in Spanish progressive rock band Atila, and the Franco-British progressive rock band Mother Gong.

== Discography ==
=== Solo albums and collaborations ===
- Towards the Sun (1981)
- Light and Shade, with Antonio Forcione (1984)
- Eurotour, with Antonio Forcione (1985)
- Celebration, with Antonio Forcione (1987)
- Music Without Frontiers, with Antonio Forcione (1987)
- The Alexander Project, with A. Foulcer (1988)
- Sequence for Guitar (1990)
- Work for Three Arts (1991)
- Spanish Projects (1992)
- The Sailors (1992)
- Poema, with Antonio Forcione (1992)
- Breathing (1993)
- I Can Fly Now (1996)
- Magic Nights (1996)
- Mediterraneo, with Adel Salameh (1996)
- The Gift (1999)
- Natural (2003)
- Lights from the Inner Side (2004)
- My Gypsy Waltz (2010)
- Las Olas de Niebla ( 2019)

=== With bands ===
- Atila, The Beginning of the End (1974)
- Atila, Intention (1975)
- Atila, Reviure (1976)
- Mother Gong, Fairy Tales (1978)
