= Dado (band) =

Uzbekistani pop band

- Origin: Tashkent, Uzbekistan
- Genres: Electronic dance Pop rock Hip-hop; Pop; Euro-House
- Years active: 1999—2008; 2012
- Labels: PanTerra Studio; Nikitin; WWW Records; GC Records
- Past members: Alisher Madumarov; Rustam Madumarov; Sherzod Madumarov
- Website: www.dadomusic.com

Dado was an Uzbekistani pop music duo consisting of brothers Alisher Madumarov and Rustam Madumarov, formed in Tashkent in 1999. The band was created by two former members of the band Anor. The duo became one of the most commercially successful pop acts of the 2000s in Uzbekistan. Being polyglots, they wrote and performed songs in Uzbek, English, Russian, Turkish, German, Tajik, French, Spanish, Italian and other languages.

Dado's debut album Y? was released in 2000. Their second album Leto was released in 2004. Dado achieved fame in Uzbekistan and other CIS countries, producing such hits as Yuragim ("My heart"), Benom ("Nameless"), Лето (Leto, "Summer") and "Chat-Pat" ("Discotheque"). Several of Dado's music videos have been broadcast by MTV Russia.

The duo disbanded in 2008. Despite this, they released the single "Космонавты" ("Kosmonavty") along with remixes of their old songs in 2012. One of the band members, Rustam Madumarov, dated Gulnara Karimova, the elder daughter of late Uzbek President Islam Karimov. In 2014 he was sentenced to 10 years imprisonment by an Uzbek court on charges of tax evasion and stealing assets worth millions of dollars. The Panama Papers revealed that Madumarov owned a large number of companies overseas, which were believed to belong to Karimova.

== Discography ==
=== Studio albums ===
- 2000 Y?
- 2004 Лето (Leto)

=== Singles ===
- Лето
- Benom
- Yuragim
- Leyla
- Yuguraman
- Dado Nado
- Я знаю тебя
- Chat pat
- Космонавты

=== Music videos ===
- No One
- Не плачь
- Лето
- Benom
- Космонавты

== Filmography ==
Film
Year	Title	Role	Notes
2000	Tohir va Zuhra yangi talqin (Tohir and Zuhra: A New Interpretation)	Themselves	Musical
