= Blue Room Released =

English electronic music record label

- Founded: 1994
- Founder: Simon Ghahary
- Genre: Goa trance, Experimental music
- Country of origin: United Kingdom
- Official website: http://www.blueroomreleased.com

Blue Room Released was an electronic music record label from London, England. It operated from 1994 until 2002. and was run by Simon Ghahary.

Blue Room Released started operating in 1994 with financial backing from the B&W loudspeaker company, based in Steyning, West Sussex, England. It was founded by Simon Ghahary, the designer and founder of Blue Room Loudspeakers who was responsible for the design and identity of the "pod" speaker series. It was based in Shoreditch, London (1995-2000) with an office in San Francisco (1997-2000). In 1996, Robert Trunz backed the venture independently with Ghahary at the helm. Blue Room was musically A&R by Simon Ghahary, with label manager Mick Paterson (formerly from Novamute/Mute Records) and was dedicated to the electronic underground, releasing techno, trance, dub, and ambient music. The label signings such as Juno Reactor, Total Eclipse, Koxbox, X-Dream, Eternal Basement, from in and around Europe, it set out to find other artists around the world, and showcased these finds on compilations, such Outside the Reactor (compiled with DJ Mike Maquire), The Trip Through Sound, Made On Earth and Signs of Life series (compiled in-house by Ghahary). Some of the music genres it had released include trance, breaks, dub, chillout, and electronica.

The record label connected Blue Room Loudspeakers to the forefront of musical innovation through an assembled global roster of talented electronic music artists pushing the envelope with sound. Ghahary also directed and cultivated its unique visual imprint designing record covers, (initially with Think electric), adverts, posters merchandise and various collaborations with underground psychedelic artists. Blue Room had a wholesome live scene, touring as a label around the world with live acts and DJ's including Dino Psaras, Xavier Morales, Mike Maquire, Frank'E, Serge Souque, Lucas Mees, Adam Ohana, and Simon G. Parties also took place regularly and locally in London with Ahimsaproductions.

With its office in San Francisco run by Nick Crayson and the Blue Room Americas team, including Adam Ohana it supported the first music appearing within the Burning Man Festival.

This platform would later grant Trunz access to Blue Room music producers and artists for collaborations with his international roster of musicians from the MELT2000 label.

== Released discography ==
Artist	Album name	Year
Various	Play Loud (CD)	1997
Fatima Mansions, The / Spectral	The Loyaliser / Bizarre Planet (12", TP)	1995
Various	Blue Room Released Vol: 1 - Outside The Reactor (CD, Comp)	1995
Various	Blue Room Released Vol: 1 - Outside The Reactor (3xLP, Comp, Gat)	1995
Fatima Mansions, The / Spectral	The Loyaliser (Juno Reactor Instrumental Remix) / Bizarre Planet (12")	1995
Total Eclipse	Le Lotus Bleu (Remix) / The Crucible (12")	1995
Total Eclipse	Delta Aquarids (CD, Album)	1995
Total Eclipse	Delta Aquarids (3xLP, Album, Gat)	1995
Spectral	Kundalini / Moonstone ◄ (2 versions)	1995
Spectral	Kundalini / Moonstone (12")	1995
Spectral	Kundalini / Moonstone (12", TP)	1995
Infinity Project, The	Mystical Experiences (CD, Album)	1995
Infinity Project, The	Mystical Experiences (2xLP, Album, Gat)	1995
Psychaos	Science Fiction / They Tried To Grab Me ◄ (2 versions)	1995
Psychaos	Science Fiction / They Tried To Grab Me (12")	1995
Psychaos	Science Fiction / They Tried To Grab Me (12", TP)	1995
Juno Reactor	Beyond The Infinite (CD, Album, Promo)	1995
Juno Reactor	Guardian Angel ◄ (2 versions)	1995
Juno Reactor	Guardian Angel (12")	1995
Juno Reactor	Guardian Angel (12", W/Lbl)	1995
Juno Reactor	Guardian Angel (CD, Single)	1995
Etnica	Tribute / Intense Visitation (12")	1995
Juno Reactor	Beyond The Infinite (Album) ◄ (2 versions)	1995
Juno Reactor	Beyond The Infinite (CD, Album, RP, Blu)	1995
Juno Reactor	Beyond The Infinite (CD, Album, Yel)	1995
Juno Reactor	Beyond The Infinite (4x12", Album, Gat)	1995
Etnica	Tribute / Astral Way (12")	1995
Etnica	Astral Way / Asian Code 7 (12", Ltd)	1995
Etnica	Starship 101 / Full On (12")	1996
Total Eclipse	Pulsar Glitch / Free Lemonade (Psychaos Remix) ◄ (2 versions)	1996
Total Eclipse	Pulsar Glitch / Free Lemonade (Psychaos Remix) (12")	1996
Total Eclipse	Pulsar Glitch / Free Lemonade (Remix) (12", W/Lbl)	1996
Koxbox	Stratosfear ◄ (2 versions)	1996
Koxbox	Stratosfear (12")	1996
Koxbox	Stratosfear (12", Promo)	1996
Koxbox	Stratosfear (CD, Maxi)	1996
Etnica	Alien Protein (Album) ◄ (2 versions)	1996
Etnica	Alien Protein (CD, Album)	1996
Etnica	Alien Protein (CD, Album)	1996
Etnica	Alien Protein (Album) ◄ (3 versions)	1996
Etnica	Alien Protein (3xLP, Album, Gat)	1996
Etnica	Alien Protein (3xLP, Ltd + 12")	1996
Etnica	Alien Protein (3xLP, Album, W/Lbl)	1996
Total Eclipse	Violent Relaxation (Album) ◄ (2 versions)	1996
Total Eclipse	Violent Relaxation (2xCD, Album)	1996
Total Eclipse	Violent Relaxation (2xCD, Promo, Album)	1996
Total Eclipse	Violent Relaxation (3xLP, Album, Gat)	1996
Total Eclipse	Space Clinic ◄ (2 versions)	1996
Total Eclipse	Space Clinic (12")	1996
Total Eclipse	Space Clinic (12", W/Lbl)	1996
Total Eclipse	Space Clinic (CD)	1996
X-Dream	The Frog ◄ (2 versions)	1996
X-Dream	The Frog (12")	1996
X-Dream	The Frog (12", W/Lbl)	1996
X-Dream	The Frog (CD, Maxi)	1996
Spectral	Celtic Alchemy ◄ (3 versions)	1996
Spectral	Celtic Alchemy (12")	1996
Spectral	Celtic Alchemy (12", W/Lbl, Promo)	1996
Spectral	Celtic Alchemy (12", TP)	1996
Spectral	Celtic Alchemy (CD, Maxi)	1996
Cydonia	Screaming Darkness / Freakshow ◄ (2 versions)	1996
Cydonia	Screaming Darkness / Freakshow (12")	1996
Cydonia	Screaming Darkness / Freakshow (12", W/Lbl)	1996
Juno Reactor	Conga Fury ◄ (2 versions)	1996
Juno Reactor	Conga Fury (12")	1996
Juno Reactor	Conga Fury / Magnetic (12", W/Lbl)	1996
Juno Reactor	Conga Fury (CD)	1996
Various	Trip Through Sound (CD, Comp)	1996
Montauk P	Hallucinate / X-Plore ◄ (2 versions)	1997
Montauk P	Hallucinate / X-Plore (12")	1997
Montauk P	Hallucinate / X-Plore (12", W/Lbl)	1997
Cwithe	I Don't Wanna Shrink / I Wanna Expand ◄ (3 versions)	1996
Cwithe	I Don't Wanna Shrink / I Wanna Expand (12")	1996
Cwithe	I Don't Wanna Shrink / I Wanna Expand (12", W/Lbl)	1996
Cwithe	I Don't Wanna Shrink / I Wanna Expand (12", TP)	1996
Tandu	Blue Aura EP (12")	1996
Various	Made On Earth - The Sampler E.P. (2x12", Smplr, EP)	1996
Various	Made On Earth (2xCD, Comp, Dig)	1997
Various	Made On Earth (3xLP, Comp, Gat)	1997
Etnica	Plastic ◄ (2 versions)	1996
Etnica	Plastic (12")	1997
Etnica	Plastic (12", W/Lbl, Promo)	1996
Etnica	Plastic (CD, Maxi)	1997
Cwithe	Illegal (CD, Album)	1997
Cwithe	Illegal (3xLP, Album)	1997
Cwithe	Illegal (3xLP, Album, TP)	1997
Metal Spark	Metal Detector / Kickstart ◄ (2 versions)	1997
Metal Spark	Metal Detector / Kickstart (12")	1997
Metal Spark	Metal Detector (12", W/Lbl, Promo)	1997
Koxbox	Too Pure ◄ (2 versions)	1997
Koxbox	Too Pure (12")	1997
Koxbox	Too Pure (12", W/Lbl, Promo)	1997
Koxbox	Too Pure (CD, Single)	1997
Koxbox	Live At Burning Man 1996 (2xLP, Album, TP)	1996
Saafi Brothers	Mystic Cigarettes (Album) ◄ (2 versions)	1997
Saafi Brothers	Mystic Cigarettes (CD, Album)	1997
Saafi Brothers	Mystic Cigarettes (CD, Album, Dig)	1997
Saafi Brothers	Mystic Cigarettes (3xLP, Album)	1997
Total Eclipse	Collapsar / Direct Motion (12")	1997
Various	Signs Of Life (Comp) ◄ (2 versions)	1997
Various	Signs Of Life (CD, Comp)	1997
Various	Signs Of Life (CD, Comp, Promo)	1997
Various	Signs Of Life (Comp) ◄ (2 versions)	1997
Various	Signs Of Life (2xLP, Comp)	1997
Various	Signs Of Life (2xLP, Comp, TP)	1997
Various	Signs Of Life Sampler (12", Smplr, Promo, W/Lbl)	1999
Delta, The	As A Child I Could Walk On The Ceiling ◄ (2 versions)	1997
Delta, The	As A Child I Could Walk On The Ceiling (12")	1997
Delta, The	As A Child I Could Walk On The Ceiling (12", W/Lbl, Promo)	1997
Noosphere	Carpe Noctum / 23rd Chromozone ◄ (2 versions)	1997
Noosphere	Carpe Noctum / 23rd Chromozone (12")	1997
Noosphere	Carpe Noctum / 23rd Chromozone (12", W/Lbl)	1997
Anesthesia	Global / Anacandy ◄ (2 versions)	1997
Anesthesia	Global / Anacandy (12", W/Lbl)	1997
Anesthesia	Global / Anacandy (12")	1997
Children Of Paradise	Alien Nation ◄ (2 versions)	1997
Children Of Paradise	Alien Nation (12")	1997
Children Of Paradise	Alien Nation (12", W/Lbl)	1997
Juno Reactor	God Is God (12")	1997
Juno Reactor	God Is God (CD, Maxi)	1997
Juno Reactor	Bible Of Dreams (CD, Album)	1997
Juno Reactor	Bible Of Dreams (3xLP, Album)	1997
Anesthesia	P.V.C. (CD, Album)	1997
Anesthesia	P.V.C. (2xLP, Album)	1997
Sunkings	Soul Sleeping (Album) ◄ (2 versions)	1998
Sunkings	Soul Sleeping (CD, Album, Car)	1998
Sunkings	Soul Sleeping (CD, Album, Car)	1998
Sunkings	Soul Sleeping (2xLP, Album, Gat)	1998
Saafi Brothers	Internal Code Error ◄ (2 versions)	1997
Saafi Brothers	Internal Code Error (12")	1997
Saafi Brothers	Internal Code Error (12", Promo, W/Lbl)	1997
Saafi Brothers	Internal Code Error (CD, Maxi)	1997
Montauk P	Def Is Lim / Electromagnetic ◄ (2 versions)	1997
Montauk P	Def Is Lim / Electromagnetic (12")	1997
Montauk P	Def Is Lim / Electromagnetic (12", W/Lbl)	1997
Silicon Attic	Arecibo Calling (12")	1997
Silicon Attic	Arecibo Calling (CD, Maxi)	1997
Johann*	Stranded (12")	1997
Johann*	Stranded (CD)	1997
Johann*	Blow Your Mind (CD, Album)	1998
Johann*	Blow Your Mind (2xLP, Album)	1998
Galaxy	Angel (CD, Album, Dig)	1998
Galaxy	Angel (2xLP, Album, Gat)	1998
Juno Reactor	God Is God (Front 242 Mixes) (12")	1997
Koxbox	Life Is.... (12")	1997
Koxbox	Life Is.... (CD, Maxi)	1997
Saafi Brothers	Internal Code Error Remixes (12", Blu)	1997
Sunkings	Starbuck (12")	1997
Sunkings	Starbuck (CD, Maxi)	1997
Koxbox	Dragon Tales (CD, Album)	1997
Koxbox	Dragon Tales (2xLP, Album)	1997
Acid Rockers	Weird World / Messages From Jupiter (12")	1997
Delta, The	Travelling At The Speed Of Thought (12")	1997
Delta, The	Travelling At The Speed Of Thought (12", TP)	1997
Cydonia	Mind Hunter (12")	1997
Cydonia	Mind Hunter (CD, Maxi)	1997
X Dream*	Brain Forest / S.T.O.P. (12")	1997
Fools And Tools	Hundreds Of Sunsets / Itchy And Scratchy (12", TP)	1997
Metalspark*	The Iron Maiden / Sonicfeet (12")	1998
Metal Spark	Corrosive (CD, Album)	1998
Metal Spark	Corrosive (2xLP, Album)	1998
X-Dream	Radio (Album) ◄ (2 versions)	1998
X-Dream	Radio (CD, Album, Dig)	1998
X-Dream	Radio (CD, Album, Dig)	1998
X-Dream	Radio (2xLP, Album)	1998
X-Dream	Radiohead (12")	1998
X-Dream	Radiohead (CD, Single)	1998
Various	Trip Through Sound 2 (CD, Comp)	1998
Alien (6)	The Pleasure Of Leisure (CD, Album, Dig)	1998
Alien (6)	The Pleasure Of Leisure (2xLP, Album)	1998
Alien (6)	Frankie The Prankster (12")	1998
Alien (6)	Frankie The Prankster (CD, Maxi)	1998
Montauk P	If I (12")	1998
Montauk P	If I (CD, Maxi)	1998
Montauk P	Def=Lim (CD, Album, Car)	1998
Montauk P.*	Def=Lim (4x12", Album, Gat)	1998
Various	More Signs Of Life (CD, Comp, Dig)	1998
Various	More Signs Of Life Album Sampler ◄ (2 versions)	1999
Various	More Signs Of Life Album Sampler (12", Smplr)	1999
Various	More Signs Of Life Album Sampler (12", W/Lbl)	1999
Various	Freekstyle (CD)	2000
Various	Freekstyle (2xLP)	2000
Total Eclipse	Access Denied (CD, Album, Dig)	1999
Total Eclipse	Access Denied (2xLP, Album)	1999
N-Tropic	Klone (12")	1998
Cydonia	In Fear Of A Red Planet (CD, Album)	1999
Cydonia	In Fear Of A Red Planet (2xLP, Album)	1999
Total Eclipse	None Of Your Business (12")	1999
Cydonia	Lightning Rods / King Of New York (12")	1999
Eternal Basement	Magnet (CD, Album)	2000
Eternal Basement	Magnet (2xLP)	2000
Juno Reactor	Pistolero (12")	1999
Juno Reactor	Pistolero (CD, Maxi)	1999
Juno Reactor	Pistolero (12")	1999
Juno Reactor	Pistolero ◄ (2 versions)	1999
Juno Reactor	Pistolero (12")	1999
Juno Reactor	Pistolero (12", S/Sided, TP, Ltd)	1999
Juno Reactor	Pistolero (12")	1999
Juno Reactor	Pistolero (CD, Maxi)	1999
Saafi Brothers	Midnight's Children (CD, Album)	2000
Saafi Brothers	Midnight's Children (2xLP, Album)	2000
X-Dream	Microchip EP (12", EP)	1999
Eternal Basement	Raw / Understood (12")	1999
Carcharodon	20 Million Years / Deepest Blue (12")	1999
Saafi Brothers	The Deep Part 1 / Not Fade Away (12")	1999
RND Technologies*	Phases (12")	1999
Alien (6)	Frankie The Prankster (12")	1999
Galaxy	The Island ◄ (2 versions)	2000
Galaxy	The Island (12")	2000
Galaxy	The Island (12", Promo)	2000
Galaxy	The Island (12", Promo)	2000
Galaxy	Solar Synthesis (CD, Album)	2000
Galaxy	Solar Synthesis (2xLP)	2000
Acid Rockers	Traveller (12")	2000
Acidrockers*	Mind Set (CD, Album, Mixed)	2001
Juno Reactor	Nitrogen Part 1 & 2 ◄ (2 versions)	2000
Juno Reactor	Nitrogen Part 1 & 2 (12")	2000
Juno Reactor	Nitrogen Pt.1/Nitrogen Pt.2 (12", Promo, W/Lbl)	2000
Deviant Electronics	Blunt Instruments (CD, Album)	2000
Spectral	Diffuse (CD, Album, Dig)	2001
Spectral	Diffuse (Album) ◄ (2 versions)	2000
Spectral	Diffuse (2xLP, Album)	2000
Spectral	Diffuse (2xLP, Album, W/Lbl, Promo)	2000
Saafi Brothers	Midnight's Children (CD, Album)	2002
Saafi Brothers	Mystic Cigarettes (CD, Album)	1997
Various	Alien Software For Alien Hardware (CD, Promo)	1995
Various	Mini-Pod Sampler (CD, Promo, Sampler)	1995
Juno Reactor	Pistolero (CDr, Single, Promo)	1999

== See also ==
- List of record labels
- List of electronic music record labels
- List of independent UK record labels
