= Harthouse =

German record label

- Founded: 1991
- Founder: Heinz Roth; Sven Väth; Matthias Hoffmann
- Distributor: Daredo Music
- Genre: Trance, Techno, Hard Trance
- Country of origin: Germany
- Location: Mannheim
- Official website: Official website

Harthouse is a German record label specializing in techno music.

The company was founded in 1992 by Sven Väth as a sublabel of Eye Q Records with the divisions Harthouse Frankfurt, Harthouse UK and Harthouse America.

In the beginning of 1997 the future of the label was uncertain, sales were dropping in the wake of rising commercial trance labels, and Sven Väth had left the label in January, causing further confusion. The firm moved from its office in Offenbach to Berlin. Two months later the firm was insolvent, and filed for bankruptcy.

At the beginning of 1998 the Under Cover Music Group (UCMG) took over the rights to use the brand name of the label as well as the trademark Harthouse. UCMG put together a Retrospective Box, a collection of the most successful releases of Harthouse.

Between 1998 and 2003, there were only several new releases.

In early 2003, UCMG started to get into financial problems. In the middle of 2003 Harthouse planned to re-release a set of old classic singles, but after some test vinyl was pressed, UCMG was closed.

In 2004 Daredo Music took over the rights of the Harthouse brand.

== See also ==
- Lists of record labels
- List of electronic music record labels
