= Gocoo =

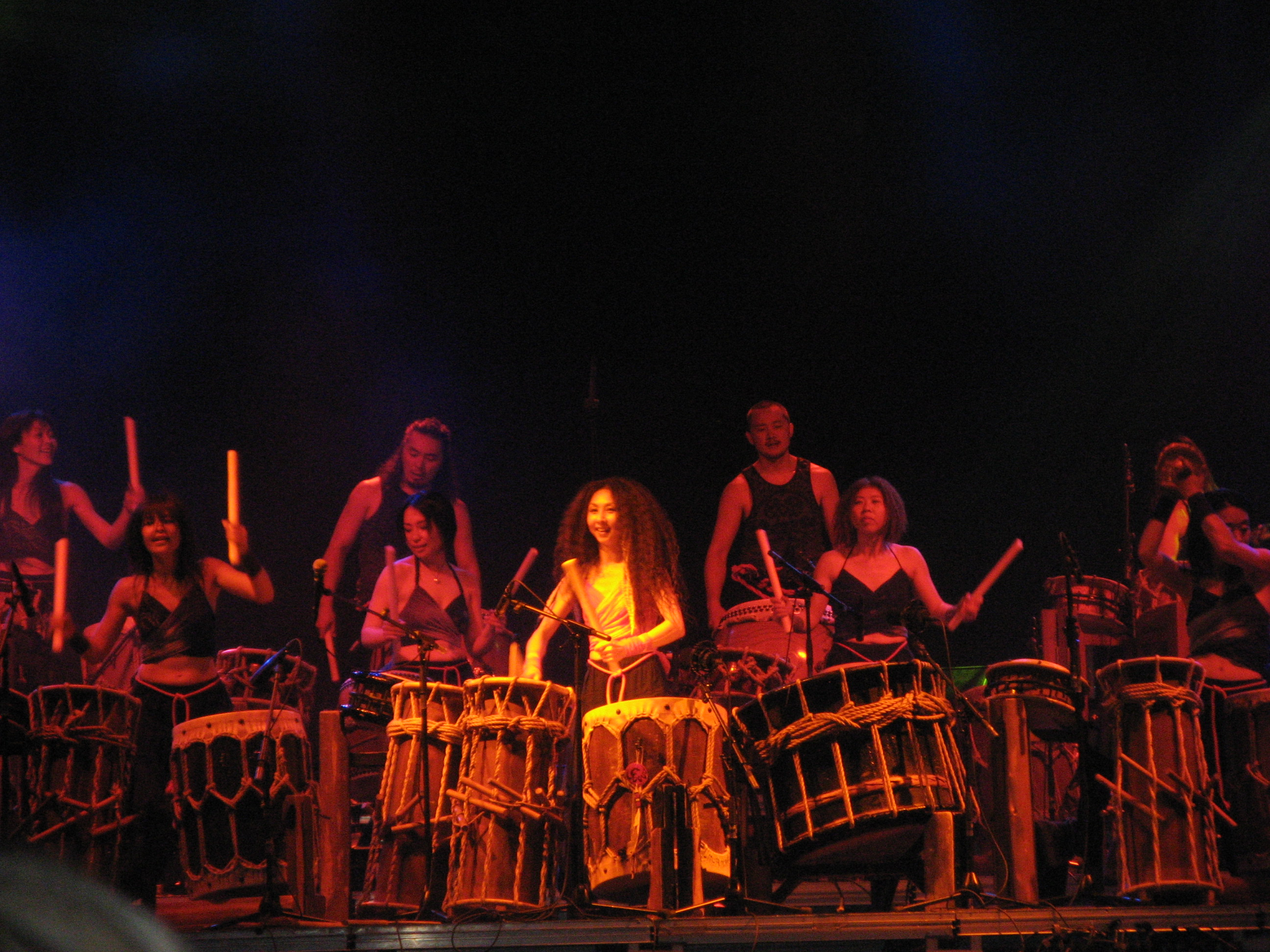

Background information
- Origin: Tokyo, Japan

Gocoo, or GOCOO (ゴクウ) are originally seven female and four male Taiko drummers from Tokyo (Japan). On stage Gocoo performs with up to 16 artists. Gocoo performed at major Music & Arts, Blues & Roots, Rock & Pop and alternative Rock festivals, in live clubs, classic theatres and concert halls or at techno events. Lead drummer, Kaoly Asano (浅野香), attracts much attention as a female Taiko artist. Whenever not performing with Gocoo on stage, she teaches the art of playing the Taiko at her Tawoo Taiko Dojo in Tokyo.

== Style ==
While many Taiko groups stoically pursue a traditional style, and while others seek new interpretations of traditional Japanese music, Gocoo's beat exhibits free-spirited Taiko music, rising freely between the East and the West, tradition and pop, rite and party. Although Gocoo's music is often referred to as crossover or world music, or even new terms such as Techno- and Trance-Taiko are created, Gocoo overcame any stereotyped concepts not only of Japanese drum music and reached their own, independent cult status. Free of ritual obligations, women, for example, have the majority among Gocoo's members.

== History ==
Gocoo was founded 1997 in Tokyo. They debuted the same year, completely atypical for a Taiko group, at the Techno Festival Rainbow 2000. Since then, Gocoo's frequent live performances at Tokyo's cult locations, such as Aoyama CAY and Shibuya On Air, are packed with a young audience who usually tend to shy away from traditional music. Gocoo also appear side by side with other bands and DJs at rave parties or open air festivals such as the Fuji Rock Festival, Asagiri Jam, or the Hotaka Mountain Festival.

Gocoo performed at the 35th Nihon no Taiko: Taiko ha Koeru (Japanese Taiko Drums Transcend) at the Japanese National Theatre in 2001 and they appeared together with the traditional Taiko ensemble Kodo at Tokyo's Earthbeat Festival in June 2005. Gocoo performed with several highly achieved artists such as Korea's Kim Duk-soo of SamulNori, West-Africa's djembe player Mamady Keita, and Seiichi Tanaka of the San Francisco Taiko Dojo.

In 2000 Gocoo's first solo album Healing Asia Vol.2 was released.

At the beginning of 2002, Gocoo joined Juno Reactor (UK) for a recording session which resulted that same fall in the release of the maxi single Hotaka. In June 2002, Universal Music published Gocoo's first live album Live 01.

In January 2003 Gocoo performed for the first time in Europe at the opening party "The Cutting Edge of Japanese Underground" of Graz as the Culture Capital of Europe 2003. They followed-up with a tour throughout Germany. Later the same year Gocoo recorded together with Juno Reactor the tunes "Tea House" and "Tetsujin" for the soundtrack of the Hollywood blockbusters The Matrix Reloaded and The Matrix Revolutions. Successively, Gocoo released their first DVD Live. In December two new CDs with tracks performed by Gocoo were released: Juno Reactor's CD "Zwara EP" and the CD Best of Healing Asia: Amatsuchi No Aida.

2004 Gocoo returned to Europe. While being on tour, Gocoo went to a recording studio in Hamburg (Germany) to contribute to the soundtrack of the third sequel of the role-play computer game Gothic 3.

In autumn 2005 Gocoo performed 34 concerts during a two month long tour through Europe and Mexico. During Gocoo's world tour in 2008 the band performed on all 5 continents. In 2009 and 2010 GOCOO returned for tours through Europe.

In its edition of July 8, 2009, Newsweek Japan included Gocoo in its top 100 list of Japanese people who "overcame cultural barriers and shine in the world" as "their borderless sound, a mix of rock and ethnic music from around the world, is cherished by international audiences".

2012 the band returned to Europe for a Summer tour through 7 countries, including concerts at MONTREUX JAZZ FESTIVAL, BOOM Festival and SZIGET Festival. After performing in 2007 on SZIGET's World Music Stage, in 2012 GOCOO opened the festival's main stage. With this for the first time ever an instrumental world music artist performed side by side with the international mainstream pop/rock acts on the main stage of the "Best European Major Festival 2011" Award winner. The concert was broadcast live and worldwide via YouTube.

2013 GOCOOs music was used for a Coca-Cola TV commercial, the band released their new live CD album ELEVEN and performed after 2005 for the second time live on German TV's ZDF Fernsehgarten as part of their 2013 Europe Summer Tour. The concerts in Belgrade, Sarajevo and Zagreb were recorded for later broadcast, the concert in Zegrab was also broadcast live and worldwide.

As part of their 'Mighty Beats Tour' 2015, GOCOO performed as the only artist two concerts at the Paleo Festival Nyon (Switzerland). The concert on July 24 was broadcast on ARTE.TV.

== Discography ==
=== Albums ===
- 2000: Healing Asia Vol.2 featuring Gocoo
- 2001: Migwitch Gitchi-Manidoo (compilation of recordings from the 2000 America tour in limited edition)
- 2002: Live 01
- 2004: LoveBeat!
- 2005: Joy -healing asia- (studio album, Gocoo + GoRo)
- 2007: "MatsuRhythm" vol.1. EarthBeat (Gocoo + GoRo)
- 2011: Roots of Joy
- 2013: Eleven

=== Collaborations and contributions to compilations ===
==== Albums ====
- 2000: Healing Asia Vol.3 featuring Li Bo
- 2000: Wish Compilation. Hybrid Acoustic Ground
- 2002: Odyssey 1992-2002 (Juno Reactor Best-Of-album)
- 2002: 武尊祭 '01 '02: Hotakasai. Hotaka Mountain Festival '01 '02
- 2003: Matrix Reloaded. Music from and inspired by the motion picture (movie soundtrack)
- 2003: Matrix Revolutions. Music from the motion picture (movie soundtrack)
- 2003: 天土の間. Amatsuchi No Aida: Best of Healing Asia (compilation of pieces from the 'Healing Asia'-series)
- 2006: Gothic 3 Original Soundtrack (computer game soundtrack)
- 2009: Spectacle. (Daishi Dance album)

==== Singles & EPs ====
- 2002: Hotaka (Juno Reactor)
- 2003: Zwara (Juno Reactor)

=== Video ===
- 2003: Live (DVD)
- 2011: Roots of Joy (DVD)
- s.a.: Japan's Magic Taiko Drummers (Promo Double-DVD)

=== Other ===
- 1996: 太鼓を打つ! (Taiko introduction in Japanese, written by Kaoly Asano. A5, 232 pages, ISBN 4-938170-28-0, ISBN 978-4-938170-28-8)
- 2011 : Gocoo participated in Mawazine, an annual world music festival in Rabat, Morocco
