= Juno Reactor =

English musical and performing group

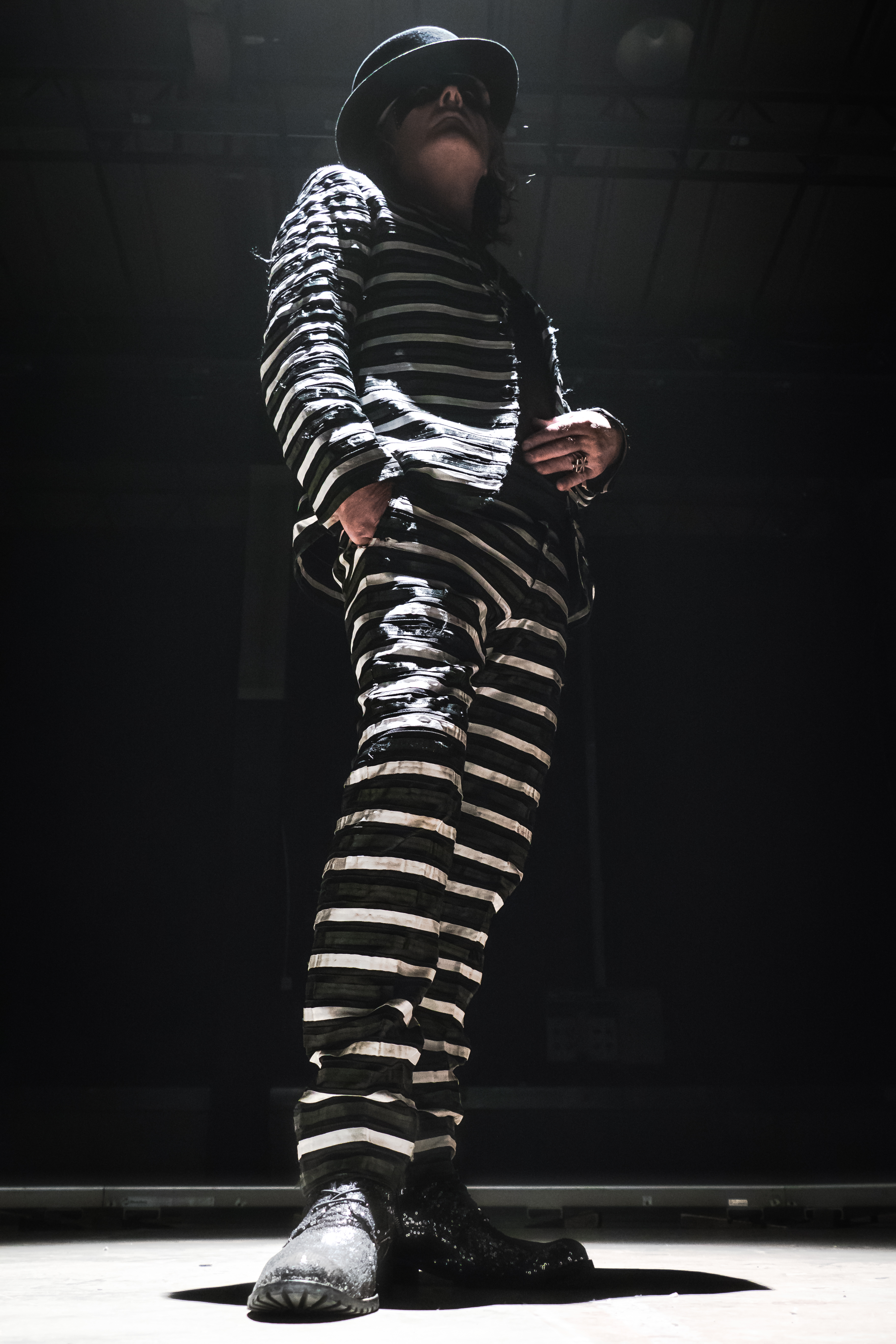
- Ben Watkins, head of Juno Reactor

Background information
- Origin: London, England
- Genres: Electronica; psytrance; goa trance; trip hop; industrial; world
- Years active: 1990–present
- Labels: Metropolis, NovaMute, Inter-Modo, Blue Room Released
- Members: Ben Watkins; Amir-John Haddad; Virna Vincelli; Karen Lugo; Liliana Izyk; Abhijit Gurjale; Mark Layton-Bennet; Hamsika Iyer
- Past members: Mike McGuire; Stephane Holweck; Jens Waldeback; Budgie; Sugizo; Johann Bley; Taz Alexander; Mabi Thobejane; Michael LaDonga; Simpiwe Marele; Mandala Lande; Greg Ellis; Paul Jackson; Steve Stevens; Squid; Xavier Morel; Kris Kylven; Tal Tula Ben Ari; Stigma Show; Eduardo Niebla; Gocoo; Mali
- Website: www.JunoReactor.com

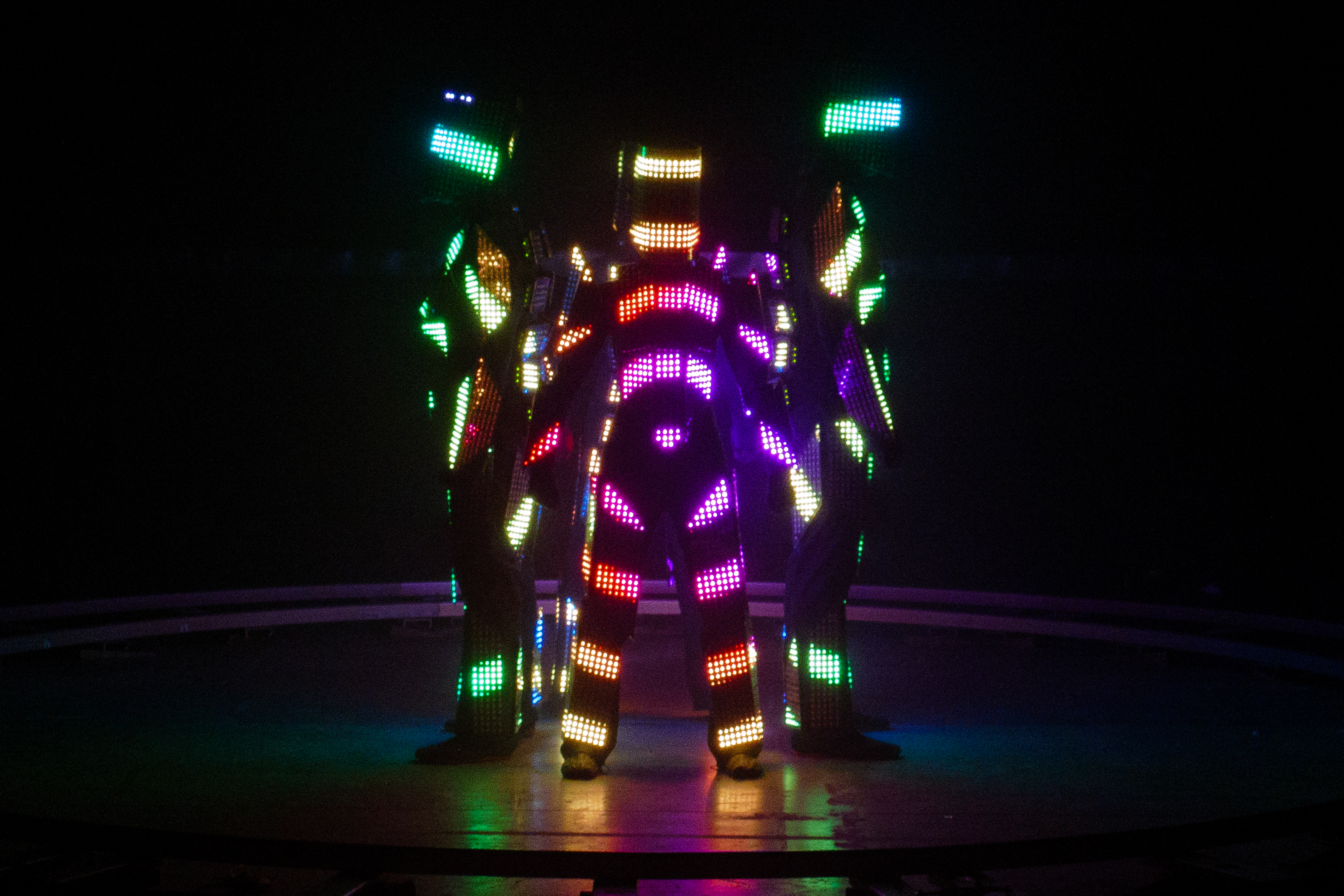
Stigma show as part of Juno Reactor

Juno Reactor is a multi-national musical and performing group, primarily based in Brighton, UK. Known for their cinematic fusion of electronic, global influences, and orchestral symphonic approach, collaborating with composer Don Davis and composing for the musical score of The Matrix (Reloaded and Revolutions). Central to the project is Ben Watkins and his collaborations with a constantly changing ensemble of musicians from across the world. This ensemble has included Mabi Thobejane, Amampondo, Steve Stevens, Eduardo Niebla, Greg Ellis, Taz Alexander, Sugizo, Budgie and recently Hamsika Iyer and Magi Hikri.

== History ==
Juno Reactor was formed as an art project in 1990. Ben Watkins wanted to collaborate with other artists, producing exciting projects that were not commercially driven. He wanted to create experimental music and non-musical soundtracks that would work with installations, art pieces, and film projects.

Juno Reactor released their first single, "Laughing Gas", in 1993 on the NovaMute label. This was soon followed by their debut album, Transmissions. Later, the band released Luciana on Alex Paterson's (The Orb) Inter-Modo label. Juno Reactor left NovaMute and Inter-Modo in 1995 and signed with the UK label Blue Room Released to release the single "Guardian Angel". Their album Beyond the Infinite was released in 1995.

The 1997 Blue Room Released Bible of Dreams was Juno Reactor's fourth album. It had a very different sound from the group's previous albums, and moved away from the traditional dance beats by implementing tribal influences. Watkins collaborated with Amampondo, a traditional South African percussion act, on the single "Conga Fury". Watkins and Amampondo went on a five-week tour of the US, opening for Moby. In 1998, Juno Reactor played a live set with Amampondo at Glastonbury Festival. The group collaborated with The Creatures on the track "I'm here...Another Planet" for the Lost in Space (1998) soundtrack. They teamed up with The Creatures again in 1999 on the track "Exterminating Angel", featured on that group's album Anima Animus.

Watkins released the fifth Juno Reactor album, Shango, in 2000. It was the first of his albums on Metropolis Records. The first track from the album, "Pistolero", was a collaboration with Billy Idol's guitarist, Steve Stevens. The track was featured during the trailer for the movie Once Upon a Time in Mexico, as well as in the film itself. In the fall of 2002, Juno Reactor released a new single titled "Hotaka". It was recorded in a Japanese studio overlooking Mount Fuji. "Hotaka" featured Stevens on guitar, and included traditional Taiko drummers Gocoo. In 2003, the album Odyssey 1992–2002 was released as a compilation of the best Juno Reactor tracks of the decade.

The sixth Juno Reactor album, Labyrinth, was released in October 2004, and featured Watkins' work from the Matrix films. The album once again featured the tribal influences present in their music through tracks like "Conquistador II".

In 2006, Watkins was hired to compose an orchestral score for Brave Story, a Japanese anime feature film. Sony Japan released the soundtrack, which was recorded at the Slovak Radio Concert Hall in Slovakia with the Slovak National Symphony Orchestra. The album was written by "Ben Watkins aka Juno Reactor".

In 2008, Watkins collaborated with anime director Koji Morimoto for Genius Party Beyond, an anthology of short animated films from Studio 4 °C.

Juno Reactor's album Gods & Monsters was released in March 2008, and featured the introduction of Ghetto Priest and Sugizo into the Juno Reactor fold, along with Eduardo Niebla, Xavier Morel, and Yasmin Levy. In 2009, the band toured with drummer Budgie, of the band Siouxsie and the Banshees.

Juno Reactor's album The Golden Sun of the Great East was released on Metropolis Records in 2013.

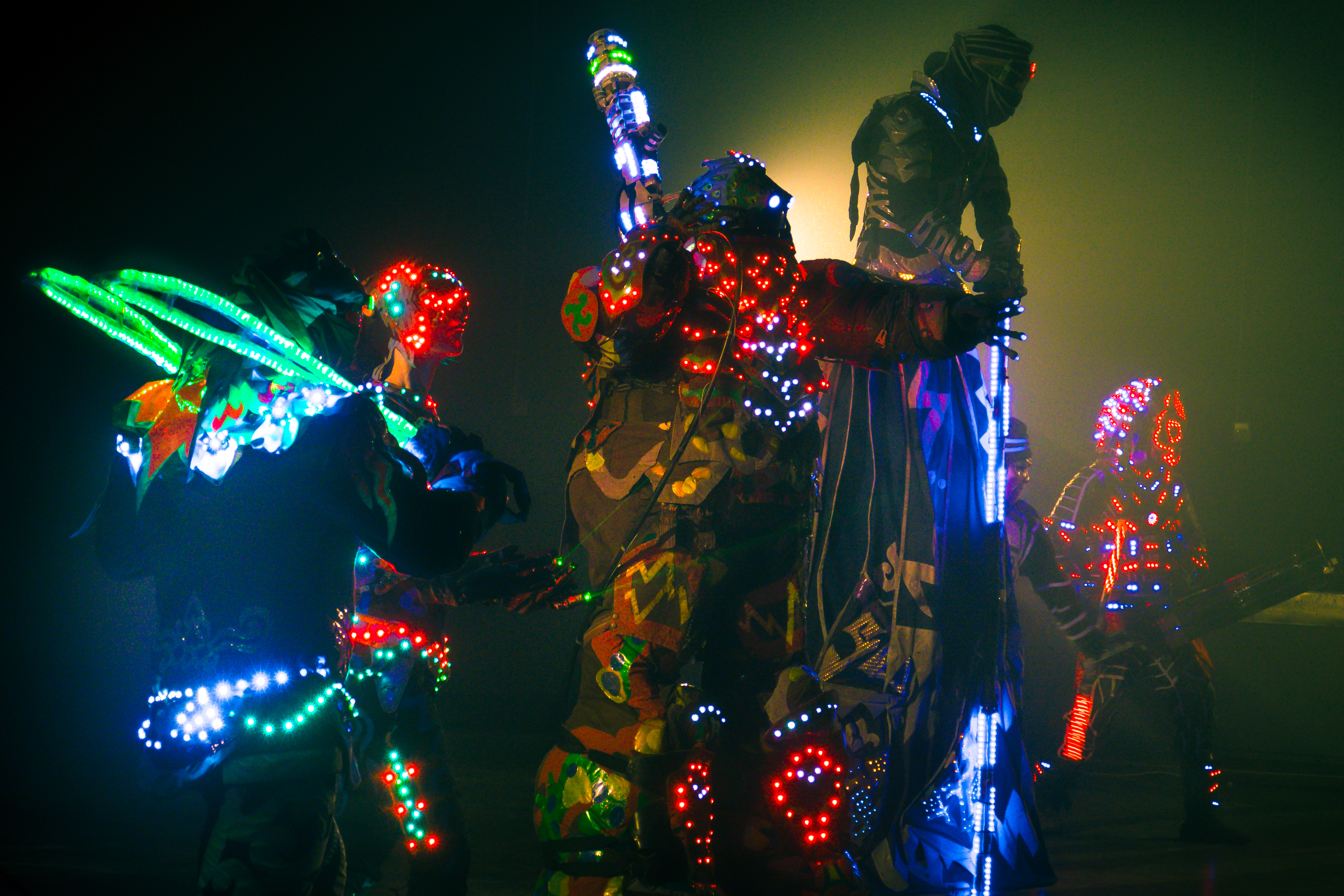
Agnivo as part of Juno Reactor

Juno Reactor & The Mutant Theatre premiered at the Ozora Festival 4 August 2016 "TIME" a unique performance featuring the Juno Reactor live band: Tal Tula Ben-Ari (vocals), Nataly Hay (dancer), Amir Haddad (oud and guitars), Ben Watkins (electronics and guitar), and Johann Bley (drums). The band was joined by Agnivo and Stigma Show, visual performance groups from Russia, under the banner of The Mutant Theatre.

The Mutant Theatre was released by Metropolis Records on 22 June 2018 and features tracks from the live show Juno Reactor & The Mutant Theatre. The first single from the album, Our World, was released on 30 June 2017.

In August 2018, Juno Reactor performed at the Hacker Conference, DEF CON. Along, on 10 August 2018, the single Dakota was released, written together with the Israeli DJ duo Undercover.

On 22 August 2019, the EP Into Valhalla was released on Metropolis Records (North America) and Blue Tunes Records (worldwide) featuring remixes by GMS and 3 of Life. Ben Watkins remixed the track Nukhta for Indian band Medieval Punditz which subsequently got released on their compilation on 30 August 2019.

== Appearances in media ==
=== Movies and television ===
Juno Reactor produced and wrote Traci Lords' hit "Control". As an instrumental it featured on the soundtrack to the 1995 Mortal Kombat movie during the fight between Liu Kang and Reptile. The group also appeared on the soundtrack to the sequel, Mortal Kombat Annihilation, with the track "Conga Fury".

In 1997, while on tour with Moby, Ben Watkins was requested to create the score for the original Japanese horror movie Ring but had to turn it down due to being mid-tour. Instead, two tracks, "Guardian Angel" and "Feel the Universe", were used on the soundtrack compilation stating "inspired by".

Later, Ben Watkins, in collaboration with Don Davis, worked with The Wachowskis for the Matrix series of films and video games. Juno Reactor's music was featured in five sequences from the middle two films in the franchise, including the highway chase (Mona Lisa Overdrive) and the Agent Smith fight (Burly Brawl) from The Matrix Reloaded and the subway train chase (The Trainman Cometh), the shootout on the Merovingian's club (Tetsujin) and the end credits (Navras) from The Matrix Revolutions. The Animatrix also featured pre-existing tracks "Masters of the Universe" (in Kid's Story) and "Conga Fury (Animatrix Remix)" (in Final Flight of the Osiris).

In 2001, "Masters of the Universe", from the album Shango, was briefly used in the Lara Croft: Tomb Raider movie trailer.

In 2006, Watkins was hired to compose an orchestral score for Brave Story, his first score with a full orchestra. The soundtrack was released in Japan, where it was the number 1 film for 6 weeks.

Many other tracks have been used in films including those listed below. Their single "Guardian Angel" was featured as the opening theme of the anime series Texhnolyze. "Guardian Angel" was also featured in the movie Drive, starring Mark Dacascos and Kadeem Hardison. Other Juno Reactor tracks appear on movies such as Eraser, Virtuosity, Lost in Space, the 1999 film Beowulf, and Once Upon a Time in Mexico. Juno Reactor soundtracks have also been played during baseball, basketball, and gridiron football games, and the Japanese Grand Prix. The track Feel the Universe is featured in the Kevin Phillips first movie, Super Dark Times.

Ben Watkins also worked on Bunraku released in the fall of 2011.

In 2008, "Mutant Message", from the album Labyrinth, was used in the Argentine TV program América Noticias hosted by Guillermo Andino.

Year	Work	Soundtrack	Notes
2011	Bunraku	"Putting on the Blitz"	composer: additional music
2017	Super Dark Times	"Feel the Universe"	
2010	Chikara: The Renaissance Dawns	"God Is God"	
2010	Documentos América	"Mutant Message"	
2018	América Noticias	"Mutant Message"	
2009	Chikara: King of Trios 2009 - Night III	"God Is God"	
2005	Secuestro Express	"War Dogs"	
2003	The Matrix Revolutions	"The Trainman Cometh", "Tetsujin", "Navras"	composer: additional music
2003	Once Upon a Time in Mexico	"Pistolero"	
2003	Kid's Story	"Masters of the Universe"	
2003	The Matrix Reloaded	"Mona Lisa Overdrive", "Komit", "Teahouse", "Burly Brawl"	
2003	The Animatrix	"Conga Fury", "Masters of the Universe"	
2003	Final Flight of the Osiris	"Conga Fury"	
2001	Lara Croft: Tomb Raider	"Masters of the Universe"	trailer
2001	Sugar & Spice	"Pistolero"	
1999	Beowulf	"God Is God"	full soundtrack
1997	Mortal Kombat Annihilation	"Conga Fury"	
1997	Drive	"Guardian Angel"	
1997	Nash Bridges	"Control", "Komit"	TV series – Episode: Knockout
1995	Virtuosity	"Samurai", "Fallen Angel"	
2009	So You Think You Can Dance	"Navras", "Tetsujin"	TV series – Episode: The Top 18 Perform, Finale: Winner Announced, Top Four Perform
1995	Mortal Kombat	"Control (Juno Reactor Instrumental)"	
2011	Sonho de Verão	"Hulelam"	
1998	Lost in Space	"I'm Here...Another Planet"	
2013	Jackpot		musical director
2007	Genius Party		full soundtrack
2005	Webbed Cam		
2003	The Fanimatrix: Run Program		
1995	Traci Lords: Fallen Angel, Version 1		music video
1995	Traci Lords: Fallen Angel, Version 2		music video
2003	Texhnolyze	"Guardian Angel"	opening credits
1996	Eraser		Trailer
2006	Brave Story		full soundtrack

=== Video games ===
The video game Final Fantasy VII may have taken inspiration from the name of the band and used it to name an in-game location: The "Junon Underwater Reactor", a mako reactor. Their work appears in the PlayStation game Jet Moto 3, PlayStation 2's Frequency, PlayStation 2's Kinetica, PlayStation 2's Splashdown: Rides Gone Wild, and the Xbox game Mad Dash Racing. Juno Reactor also scored the PlayStation 2 game The Mark of Kri.

Juno Reactor also has a song in the game Dance Dance Revolution Ultramix 4. The trailer for Secuestro Express includes an excerpt from the song "War Dogs" from the album Labyrinth. Also from Labyrinth, the song "Mutant Message" is featured in the Legion trailer.

Gran Turismo commissioned Juno Reactor to create exclusive GT mixes of Alien and Return of the Pistolero for their global release of Gran Turismo Sport, both tracks appear on the 2018 album.

Year	Video game	Soundtrack	Notes
2008	Madagascar: Escape 2 Africa	"Hula Lam"	
2001	Mad Dash Racing	"Nitrogen Part II"	
2002	Frequency	"Higher Ground"	
2001	Kinetica	"Nitrogen Part II"	
2005	The Matrix: Path of Neo		co-composer
2002	The Mark of Kri		entire music
1992	Outlander		
2018	Gran Turismo	"Alien", "Return of the Pistolero"	exclusive remixes
1997	Wing Commander: Prophecy	"Komit"	

== Discography ==
=== Full-length albums ===
- Transmissions (NovaMute Records 1993)
- Luciana (Inter-Modo 1994) (61-minute track originally recorded for the traveling art installation The Missile Project)
- Beyond the Infinite (Blue Room Released 1 October 1995)
- Bible of Dreams (Blue Room Released 1997)
- Shango (Metropolis Records 2000)
- Labyrinth (Metropolis Records, Universal Music 2004)
- Gods & Monsters (Metropolis Records 2008)
- The Golden Sun of the Great East (Metropolis Records, April 2013)
- The Mutant Theatre (Metropolis Records, 22 June 2018)

=== Singles and EPs ===
- Laughing Gas (1993)
- High Energy Protons (1994)
- Guardian Angel (1995)
- Samurai (1995)
- Conga Fury (1996)
- Jungle High (1997)
- God Is God (1997)
- GOD IS GOD!! (Front 242 Mixes) (1997)
- Pistolero (Blue Room Released 2000)
- Nitrogen (2000) – 2 tracks taken from Shango
- Masters of the Universe (2001)
- Hotaka (2002)
- The Zwara EP (2003)
- Song to the Siren (2009)
- Fear Not (with Laibach, 2009)
- Our World (Juno Reactor & The Mutant Theatre) (2017)
- Dakota (Juno Reactor & The Mutant Theatre) (2018)
- Into Valhalla (2019)

=== Live recordings and compilation albums ===
- Odyssey 1992–2002
- Shango Tour 2001 Tokyo (Live in Tokyo) (2002)
- Juno Reactor Live – Audio Visual Experience (2007)
- Inside the Reactor (2012)
- The Golden Sun – Remixed (2015)
