= Psy-Fi =

Annual psychedelic music and arts festival in the Netherlands, starting 2013

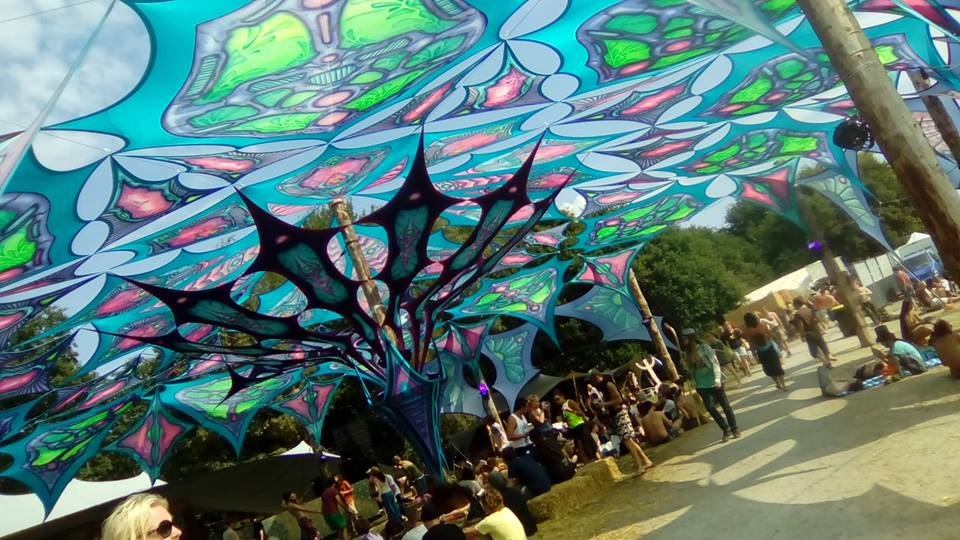
- The Chill Out stage at Psy-Fi.
- Genre: Psychedelic music and arts festival
- Date: August
- Frequency: Annual
- Locations: Stadspark Groningen, Netherlands (2013); De Groen Ster near Leeuwarden, Netherlands (2014–2019)
- Years active: 2013 – 2019
- Website: www.psy-fi.nl

Psy-Fi was an annual open air psychedelic music and arts festival former in the Netherlands. The first edition was held in July 2013 in the Stadspark of the city of Groningen; all subsequent editions have been held in recreation area De Groene Ster to the east of Leeuwarden. It was one of the largest international festivals in the Netherlands and attracted thousands of visitors each year, with the 2017 edition reporting participants from about 100 countries. In 2019, project leader Wiebe Kootstra stated that only 18% of the attendees lived in the Netherlands, the rest visited the festival from abroad.

== History ==
The first Psy-Fi festival was held in the Stadspark of Groningen, hence the edition was themed "Glow in the Park". It lasted from Friday night 12 July until Monday morning 15 July 2013, described as a "65-hour meditative trip full of hippie love and goa trance." Subsequent editions were all held in recreation area De Groene Ster near Leeuwarden. The festival has often been described as "neopsychedelic" and its participants "neo-hippies".

Both the 2016 and 2017 editions were heralded as a great success, with many visitors praising the organizers, apart from parking problems. Some locals complained about noise, although official measurements concluded the sound remained within norms. In 2017, project leader Wiebe Kootstra described Psy-Fi as 'a community of a week', where 'lots of different people all treat each other in the same way'. He said that everyone who came to participate was excited, the ambiance was "super relaxed" and there was no need for security measures against aggression. An interviewed attendee described it as a "very open-minded festival, calm, everyone can sit and chill and do what they want" and that the people were "sweet".

During the 2018 edition, themed "A Shamanic Experience", the opening ceremony featured shamans from Mexico, Greenland, the Māori community of New Zealand and a Native American from North America in traditional clothing, performing various rituals (including ancestor worship) with incense, several objects and acoustic music, led by drums. The province of Friesland fined the organization €10,000 over the placement of tents in the woods rather than exclusively on grass, which allegedly harmed flora and fauna. The organization disputed the fine, saying they were not informed on time, and had no ways of accommodating all guests within the limited space available, and the mayor of Leeuwarden refused to extend the camping terrain out of safety concerns.

From the 2019 edition onward, the organization implemented a ban on the sale of various single-use items as part of its efforts to minimise waste. It also decided that all food sold on the festival terrain would henceforth be vegetarian; during previous editions, about 5% of all food stands sold meat.

The 2022 edition that was planned for 14-18 September was cancelled because the municipality of Leeuwarden had made administrative mistakes concerning the permits around noise and environmental impact.

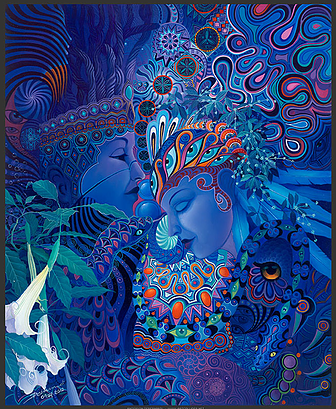
Art at Psy-Fi.

Event	Date	Location	Notes
Psy-Fi 2013: Glow in the Park	12 – 15 July 2013	Stadspark, Groningen	
Psy-Fi 2014: Inside the Vortex	28 August – 1 September 2014	De Groene Ster, Leeuwarden	
Psy-Fi 2015: Out of the Void	27 – 31 August 2015	De Groene Ster, Leeuwarden	The 2015 edition reportedly attracted 15,000 visitors from 83 countries.
Psy-Fi 2016: Holographic Universe	24 – 28 August 2016	De Groene Ster, Leeuwarden	
Psy-Fi 2017: Book of Changes	16 – 20 August 2017	De Groene Ster, Leeuwarden	The 2017 edition reportedly attracted 15,000 visitors from about 100 countries.
Psy-Fi 2018: A Shamanic Experience	15 – 19 August 2018	De Groene Ster, Leeuwarden	The 2018 edition reportedly attracted 11,500 visitors.
Psy-Fi 2019: Seed of Science	28 August – 1 September 2019	De Groene Ster, Leeuwarden	

== Terrain ==
The festival terrain at De Groene Ster is subdivided into sections, including several stages featuring different styles of music, a Sacred Island (including The Spirit Gathering) where workshops and lectures are held and services are offered, art galleries and expositions, and numerous shops where food and drinks, clothing and merchandise can be bought. On the edge of the festival terrain, there are two camping sites for participants. Visitors can swim in the various open waters on the terrain, which is an official nude beach.

- Main Stage: 'flowing grooves from psytrance or goa trance' are played from a decorated deejay platform with a roof over the dance floor. These constructions have 'fluorescent colors which shine brighter as darkness falls and the light show increases in intensity'.
- Alternative Stage (2019: Freak Stage): a stage that features 'more intense' genres such as Forest, Hitech and Psycore.
- Chill Out Stage: a stage that features chill-out music, such as Psydub, Psybient, Glitch, Dub and Psychill for attendees who seek to 'give their souls and legs some rest'.
- Global Theatre (2019: 4th Floor): a stage introduced in 2017 featuring mostly local musicians playing instruments with 'relaxed grooves' rather than DJs.

== Notable artists featured ==
- Astrix
- Carbon Based Lifeforms
- Earthling
- Electric Universe
- Etnica
- GMS
- Hallucinogen
- Hux Flux
- Juno Reactor
- Koxbox
- Loud
- Man with No Name
- Ott
- Perfect Stranger
- Protonica
- Shpongle a.k.a. Raja Ram
- Vibrasphere
- Vini Vici a.k.a. Sesto Sento

== Drug policy ==
Psy-Fi is known for its liberal policy regarding drugs, which Vice News described as 'free and responsible'. After negotiations, the city council of Leeuwarden agreed that on-site education about various substances would be better than collecting fines, and agreed to a system of elaborate information and help for users, availability of legal drugs and drug tests. Officials and organizers noted that the kind of substances used at Psy-Fi did 'not cause nuisance, there are no fights, unlike at parties elsewhere in the city.' If caught, illegal drugs will be confiscated, but police and security are not systematically looking for it, and attendees can usually bring their own substances without getting in trouble. It has been claimed that Psy-Fi is one of the few festivals around the world where legal psychedelics are also sold, namely psilocybin truffles.

== Complaints about noise ==
Some local residents complained about noise from the 2014 edition, and demanded that the festival be prohibited. However, the judge ruled that the city council of Leeuwarden should first conduct sound measurements at Psy-Fi 2015 to check whether sound limits were actually exceeded. Other locals reported no nuisance from noise in 2014, and enjoyed the festival visitors' presence. After the city council imposed additional sound regulations in late 2015, Psy-Fi briefly considered moving to a different municipality, but decided to stay and accept the stricter norms. In April 2016, the municipal remonstrance commission reprimanded the city council for not taking nearby residents' complaints about noise seriously enough. In 2016 and 2017, two-thirds of all complaints (the total being 70 in 2016 and 100 in 2017) about the festival were about noise; however, according to the city council, which regularly measured the sound levels, no norms were crossed. Meanwhile, the vast majority of nearby residents from surrounding villages appeared to be okay with the relative level of noise for one week a year. In August 2018, a judge ruled that the bass sounds had to be decreased from 96 to 79 decibel at night (from 11 p.m. to 7 a.m. during midweek and from 1 a.m. to 9 a.m. in the weekend) to allow nearby residents to sleep. Complainants were satisfied with the "significant reduction", and organizers said it made "little difference" to them.

== See also ==
- Boom Festival
- Burning Man
- Liquicity
- Ozora Festival
- Tamera
- List of electronic music festivals
