= Eitan Reiter =

Israeli musician and producer

Eitan Reiter איתן ריטר
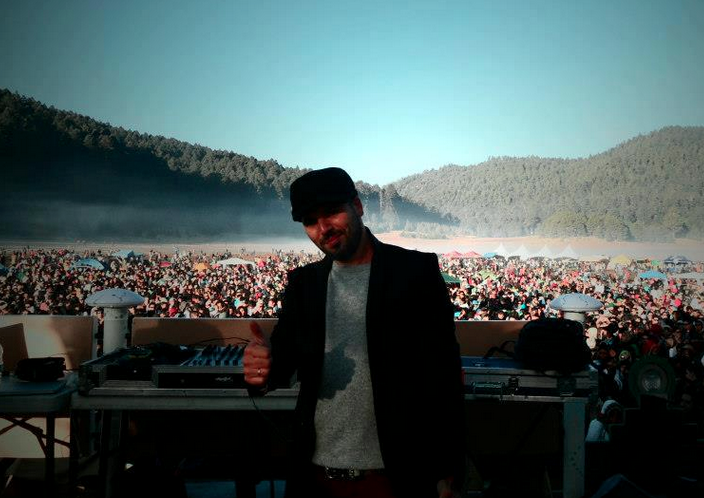

Background information
- Origin: Haifa, Israel
- Genres: Electronica; electronic music; techno; deep house; tech house; progressive house; chillout music; world music
- Occupations: Record producer; Sound engineer
- Years active: 2006–present
- Labels: Aleph Zero; Digital Structures; Mule-Musiq
- Member of: Loud, Unoccupied, Eitan Reiter & A. Balter, Eitan Reiter & Sebastian Mullaert, Eitan Reiter & Gal Perez
- Website: www.EitanReiter.com

Eitan Reiter (Hebrew: איתן ריטר; born December 3, 1982) is an Israeli musician and producer. Eitan has released seven studio albums, one in his solo project under his own name, one album with Sebastian Mullaert, four studio albums as LOUD with Kobi Toledano, and one album as Unoccupied with Nadav Katz.

== Music ==
=== Solo project ===
Reiter released his first solo album titled Places I miss that I haven’t been to through Aleph Zero Records, some of the tracks in this album were commercially successful, and were later remixed by J.viewz Reiter remixed Balkan Beat Box song Look Them Act with Ori Rousso.

=== Collaboration with Sebastian Mullaert ===
Reiter's 2014 project was a collaboration with Sebastian Mullaert from minilogue. After working together for a while they released the album Reflection of Nothingness. They are working together on their next studio album.

=== LOUD ===
Reiter's main project is the electronic music band LOUD, together with record producer and sound engineer Kobi Toledano they have been producing original electronic music since 2006. They have released four studio albums together and as of 2015 were working on a fifth studio album, planned for release by Nano Records.

=== Collaboration with A. Balter ===
In 2010 Reiter and A. Balter collaborated on a psy-trance, techno and minimal music project.

=== Unoccupied ===
Reiter had access to a recording studio near his home town where he was producing his own music. He shared his studio time with audio engineer Nadav Katz as part of mixing the first three albums by LOUD. In 2008 they released the Everyday Life album.

=== Mixing, sound production and engineering ===
Reiter provided sound design, co-writing, co-arranging and mixing for Shayman, and was producer and sound engineer for Empirikal.

He also produced music for a short Israeli documentary film called Sea Sick, a short animated film by Liat Koren, and his single Ups & Downs, which was re-edited by Perfect Stranger, was in the soundtrack of the Brazilian drama film Artificial Paradises.

== Discography ==
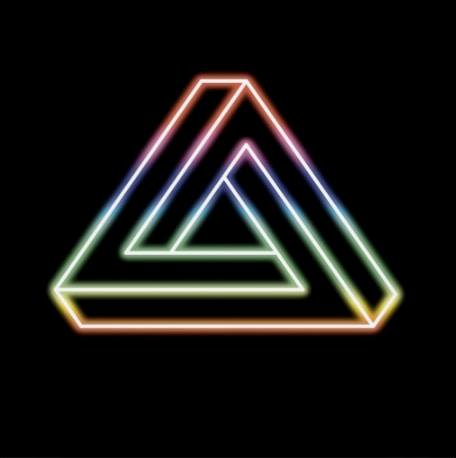
Eitan Reiter Logo

=== Studio albums ===
- Eitan Reiter – Places I Miss That I Haven't Been To, Style: Ambient, Downtempo, 2010. Aleph-Zero
- Eitan Reiter - Give it Life, Style: Electronic, Downtempo, 2017. Armadillo UK

=== Collaboration albums ===
- Eitan Reiter & Sebastian Mullaert – Reflections Of Nothingness, Style: Techno, 2014. Mule-Musiq
- LOUD [Eitan Reiter feat. Kobi Toledano] – No More X Style: Psy Trance, Electronica, 2012. Nano Records
- LOUD [Eitan Reiter feat. Kobi Toledano] – Free From Conceptual Thoughts, Style: Psy Trance, 2010. Drive Records
- LOUD [Eitan Reiter feat. Kobi Toledano] – Abstract, Style: Psy Trance, 2008. Drive Records
- LOUD [Eitan Reiter feat. Kobi Toledano] – Some Kind of Creativity, Style: Psy Trance, 2006. Drive Records
- Unoccupied [Eitan Reiter feat. Nadav Katz] – Everyday Life, Style: Electronica, 2007. Aleph-Zero

=== EPs/Compilations ===
- Eitan Retier – Ups & Downs
- Eitan Reiter & Perfect Stranger – Lizzard
- Eitan Reiter & A. Balter – iRich
- Eitan Reiter – Smile Dance Remixes
- Eitan Reiter & A. Balter – Vuvuzela
- Eitan Reiter & A. Balter – Komodo Dragon
- Eitan Reiter – Smile
- Eitan Reiter & A. Balter – Happy Fat Kids
- Eitan Reiter & A. Balter – Second Chance
- Eitan Reiter & Perfect Stranger – The Bite
- Eitan Reiter & A. Balter – EOE
- Eitan Reiter & A. Balter – Ups & Downs Remixes
- Eitan Reiter & Ido Ophit – Pipeline Music
