= Protonica =

German progressive psytrance band

- Origin: Berlin, Germany
- Genres: Psytrance
- Years active: 2003–present
- Members: Piet Kämpfer
- Past members: Ralf Dietze
- Website: protonica.de

Protonica is a German progressive psytrance project, founded in 2003 in Berlin, Germany. Since 2024, the project has been continued solely by Piet Kämpfer. Billboard ranked Protonica 8th in 2013, on their Next Big Sound chart.

The band performs regularly on music festivals, all over the world, for instance at Universo Paralello (Brazil), Rainbow Serpent (Australia), Ozora Festival (Hungary), Fusion Festival (Germany), Ilo Festival (Mexico), Groove Attack (Israel) and Boom Festival (Portugal). The Vancouver Sun mentioned about Protonica in 2013, one of the most in-demand acts in the world. Protonica tracks are often in Beatport charts. Synapse Audio calls Protonica some of the biggest players in the Psy Trance genre.

== Reviews and charts ==
=== Search ===
Search was listed 1st in the Top 10 Psy Trance charts by Juno Records, in September 2009.

=== Form Follows Function ===
BPM magazine called the album solid. Inside Dance Music Magazine, called the Form Follows Function album a masterpiece. Psyreviews was impressed, and gave it 4 of 5 stars. I Am Not A Music Journalist gave the album 8 out of 10 stars.

== Discography ==
Albums

- Search (2007, AP Records)
- Form Follows Function (2012, IONO Music)
- Symmetry (2019, Iboga Records)
