= Loud (Israeli band) =

Israeli musical duo

LOUD
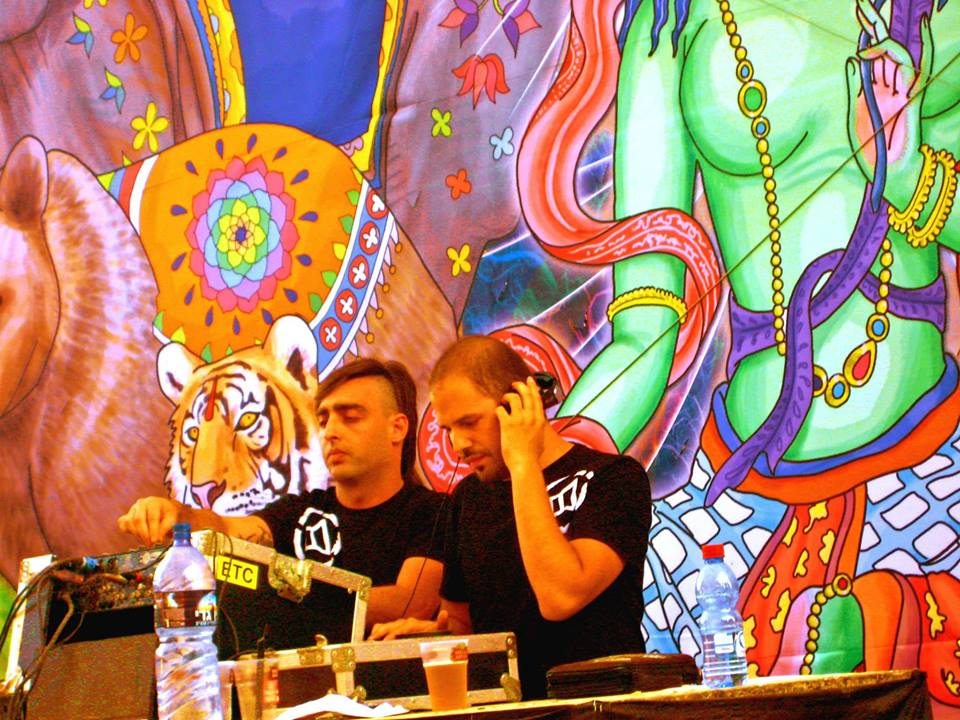

Background information
- Origin: Haifa, Israel
- Genres: Psychedelic trance, trance, Goa trance, psychedelic music, electronica, electronic music
- Occupations: Record Producer, Sound Engineer
- Years active: 2006–present
- Labels: Drive Records, Nano Music
- Members: Kobi Toledano; Eitan Reiter
- Website: loud-live.com

LOUD are a psytrance / electronica / psychedelic music group consisting of Kobi Toledano and Eitan Reiter, both from Haifa, Israel. LOUD have been called "one of the hottest and most interesting groups in the world trance scene today."

== Members ==
Eitan Reiter was born on 3 December 1982 in Haifa, Israel, the son of a classical guitar player. He became fascinated by the sounds of synthesizers and when he was 16 started making music on his computer using Impulse Tracker.

Kobi Toledano was born on 1 December 1976 in Haifa, Israel. Since his youth he was interested in electronic devices, taking them apart and putting them back together. Kobi worked for years in a recording studio managing and producing young artists. He discovered trance music and Psychedelic music while attending rave parties in the early 1990s in the forests of Northern Israel. Kobi graduated from a leading sound school in the Galilee, northern Israel, and was the producer of a few psychedelic groups.

== Music career ==
Kobi Toledano and Eitan Reiter have been producing electronic music together since 2006, blending old school roots with new sounds.

In 2009 the group was invited by BPM College, the leading institute in Israel for sound and music production studies, to conduct an artist workshop. The success of the workshop led to an ongoing relationship with BPM.

In 2011 the group was signed to the English/South African label Nano Records and since then have released several recordings.

LOUD have collaborated and remixed, and have been remixed, by many artists, including: Simon Posford, Art of Trance, Union Jack, Dr Motte – Founder of Love Parade Berlin (released on PAXXIZ), Sebastian Mullaert, Infected Mushroom, J.Viewz, Bluetech, Son Kite, Astrix, Perfect Stranger, Shulman, Prometheus, Captain Hook, Dekel, and Ace Ventura.

In 2013 LOUD assisted BPM in the development of its BPM Remixed project. The success of this collaboration led to similar projects.

== Festivals ==
LOUD have performed in almost every country that holds electronic dance music. Among their international performances are:

- Symbiosis Gathering (US),
- BOOM Festival (Portugal),
- Urban Art Forms (Austria),
- Universo Paralello (Brazil),
- Earth Dance (South Africa),
- Rainbow Serpent (Australia),
- Matreia Festival (Australia),
- Glade Festival (UK),
- XXXperience (Brazil),
- Ozora Festival (Hungary),
- Antaris Festival (Germany),
- Hadra Festival (France),
- Time and Space (Mexico),
- Luminate (New Zealand),
- GeoParadise (Panama),
- Electrance Festival (Brazil),
- Amazon Halloween Ritual (Canada),
- Sunburn Festival (India),
- Origin Festival (South Africa),
- Groove Attack (Israel),
- SoulVision Festival (Brazil),
- World Trance Festival (France),
- Funjoya (Israel),
- Atmosphere Festival (Israel),
- Spirit Base Festival (Germany),
- Burning Man Art and Music Festival (US),
- Harvest Festival (Canada),
- UNITY Festival (Israel),
- Neverland Festival (Israel),
- Tribaltech Festival (Israel),
- Revolution9 (Pakistan),
- BAT (Argentina),
- Psytronic Festival (Brazil),
- Equilibrium Festival (Brazil),
- Fantastic Festival (Mexico),
- Normafa NYE (Hungary),
- Galaxy Evolution (India),
- Hilltop Festival (India)

== Discography ==
=== Studio albums ===
==== Some Kind of Creativity ====
(November 2006, Drive Records)

- All tracks written and produced by Kobi Toledano and Eitan Reiter.

Some Kind of Creativity track list
Track number	Title	BPM	Length
#1	"G-mini Click"	137	08:25
#2	"Subinya"	141	07:18
#3	"Past Progressive"	145	08:03
#4	"Engines On"	142	06:35
#5	"In Rage"	143	06:29
#6	"Elastic Mood"	144	07:02
#7	"Sun Dance"	143	07:42
#8	1 "Missed Call"	144	07:34
#9	"Long Cut"	142	07:36

==== Abstract ====
(January 2008, Drive Records)

- All tracks written and produced by Kobi Toledano and Eitan Reiter.

Abstract track list
Track number	Title	BPM	Length
#1	"Loose Senses"	140	08:13
#2	"Machines 2008"	143	06:24
#3	"DownUnder"	140	07:54
#4	"Abstract"	142	07:43
#5	"Next"	145	08:00
#6	"Tough Kid"	145	07:30
#7	"Hiss"	139	07:31
#8	"The Edge"	136	07:10
#9	"Disoriented (Sabotage mix)"	140	10:25

==== Free From Conceptual Thoughts ====
(May 2010, Drive Records)

- All tracks written and produced by Kobi Toledano and Eitan Reiter.

Free From Conceptual Thoughts track list
Track number	Title	BPM	Length
#1	"Enlightenment"	138	10:44
#2	"One Way"	144	11:21
#3	"All Rights Reversed"	144	10:16
#4	"Milestone"	140	10:08
#5	"Big Squid"	144	08:13
#6	"Sector 7 G"	149	07:42
#7	"You Are Everything"	143	09:33
#8	"Tales From the Loudmobile"	135	08:15

==== No More X ====
(April, 2012 Nano Records)

- All tracks written and produced by Kobi Toledano and Eitan Reiter.
- Track #1 If... written and produced by Yaniv Shulman, Kobi Toledano & Eitan Reiter

No More X track list
Track number	Title	BPM	Length
#1	"If..."	135	10:25
#2	"Dr. Who"	135	09:07
#3	"Perpetuum Mobile"	165	11:28
#4	"Solid"	139	08:25
#5	"Shores of Titan"	138	09:10
#6	"Triceratops"	135	08:17
#7	"Station 42"	132	14:21

=== Compilations ===
==== Private Lesson ====
(May, 2007 Drive Records)

Private Lesson track list
Track number	Title	Artists	BPM	Length
#1	"Pounding" (LOUD remix)	Sub6	142	06:52
#2	"Insoc" (live edit)	Panic	145	06:18
#3	"Keep Your Mind Open" (O.M.C remix)	Cosma, O.M.C	140	08:13
#4	"Dominatrix" (LOUD & Domestic remix)	Psysex	141	07:43
#5	"Tiny Noize Point" (live edit)	LOUD	143	07:24
#6	"Yoki"	Black & White	145	07:23
#7	"Internal Voice"	Insomnia	146	07:38
#8	"Basic Conversation"	Unoccupied	120	04:17

==== LOUD - The Remixes ====
(July, 2011 Nano Records)

LOUD - The Remixes track list
Track number	Title	Artists	Remixer	BPM	Length
#1	"L.S.Dance"	Psysex	LOUD	140	07:53
#2	"Subinya"	LOUD	Ace Ventura	138	10:29
#3	"Sun Dance"	LOUD	Perfect Stranger	135	10:00
#4	"One Way"	LOUD	Prometheus	144	07:48
#5	"Digital Hippie"	LOUD	Psysex, Activator	137	09:13
#6	"Wired"	LOUD	Captain Hook	135	08:52
#7	"All Rights Reversed"	LOUD	Avalon	144	07:53
#8	"Big Squid"	LOUD	Laughing Buddha	144	08:46
#9	"Enlightenment"	LOUD	Zen Mechanics	138	09:57

=== Singles/EPs ===
- "Digital Hippie", 2009, Drive Records
- "1/3", 2010, Drive Records
- "Engines On" (Perfect Stranger remix), 2010, Digital Structures
- "People Music Money Drugs", 2011, HOMmega HD
- "Genetic Lottery", 2013, HOMmega HD
- "Moroccan Roll", 2014, Platipus Music

=== Appearances ===
- "Beautiful Day": Various – Enemies & Allies
- "Elastic Mood": Astralex – 24/7
- "Small Talk": Various – Return Of The Boom Shanti – Trinity Series Vol. 1
- "Machines": DJ Ayawaska – The Ayahuaska Experience
- "Tiny Noise Point": Various – Desertdust
- "Warzone": Various – Darklines
- "Grind" (rmx): Elyxir And Inner-G – Sunrise
- "Gogo": Various – Goa Love Vol. 1
- "Betone" (version 2005): Nitro & U-Recken – Soul Anatomy
- "Gogo": Various – Absolute Trancelucent
- "Beautiful Day" (remix): Xerox – Eruption
- "DMT Server": Various – Goa Trance Missions Volume 6
- "Subinya" (Perfect Stranger remix): DJ Gino – Chacruna
- "Small Talk 2009": DJ Bog & DJ Solly – The Union
- "Past Progressive": K-Isuma – Fullon Dreams
- "Teleport": Various – Israliens V.6 – Close Trance Encounters
- "Old Faces": X.S.I. – Universal Religion
- "Pink Noize": Various – Blacklite Tubes
- "Dustortion": Various – Set: 12 – Iboga Trance Classics
- "Pigz Don't Give A Damn": Various – Fractal Nature Vol. 1
- "Network": Easy Riders – New Order 3
- "Tales From The Loudmobile" (Broken Toy rmx): Regan – Origin Four
- "Enlightenment" (Oforia remix): Various – Flight 604
- "Motorcycle From Hell": Driss – Resistrance
- "Engines On" (Mute remix): Funk Truck – Reconnexion
- "Distortion": Liquid Soul – Groove Attack
- "Dustortion" (Perfect Stranger remix): Banel – 25 DJ Anniversary
- "Sundance" (Perfect Stranger 2012 remix): Various – Set: 17 – Iboga Trance Classics
- "If...: Raja Ram" – Raja Ram's Pipe Dreams Volume 02
- "Dr. Who" (Headroom remix): Captain Hook – Best Of My Sets vol 09
- "Loose Senses" (Mr. What? remix): Mr. What? – Best Of My Sets Vol 13
- "Moroccan Roll" (original mix): Various – Flight 604 II
- "Walk The Plank" (Logica remix): Gaudium – Best Of My Sets Vol 10
- "Dr Who" (Headroom remix): Various – Set: 20 – Iboga Trance Classics
- "Dustortion" (Suntree & Antigravity remix): Egorythmia & DJ Bim – Goa Culture XIII
- "Zapped": Ace Ventura – Goa Session Galaxy Evolution, Goa, Morjim Plateau

== Collaborations & Side Projects ==
=== Kobi Toledano ===
- With Samuel Wallerstein (aka ON3): Chain Reaction

=== Eitan Reiiter ===
- With Sebastian Mullaert (aka Minilogue): Eitan Reiter & Sebastian Mullaert
- With Avishay Balter (aka A. Balter): Eitan Reiter & A. Balter
- With Nadav Katz (aka Cuts): Unoccupied
- Also acting in his own project under the name Eitan Reiter

== Production equipment ==
Product Type	Product Name
Computer	MacBook Pro i7
Studio Monitors	ATC 100
Studio Monitors	Yamaha NS-10
Synthesizers	Korg MS-10
Synthesizers	Roland SH 101
Synthesizers	Roland TB 303
Synthesizers	Roland JUNO 6
Synthesizers	Arturia MikroBrute
Synthesizers	Novation Bass Station II
Controllers	2 X LIVID CTRLR
Effects	Moog Delay MF 104
Effects	Moog Filter MF 101
Effects	Moog Phaser MF 103
Effects	Moog Freqbox MF 107
Effects	Electro Harmonics
Effects	Holy Grail
Microphone	Neumann TLM 103

== Videos ==
Year	Title	Director	Link
2012	"LOUD & Shulman - If..."	Oron Aiche	Watch it!
2012	"LOUD - DR. Who"	Oron Aiche	Watch it!
2012	"LOUD - Perpetuum Mobile"	Oron Aiche	Watch it!
2012	"LOUD - Solid"	LOUD	Watch it!
2012	"LOUD - Shores of Titans"	Oron Aiche	Watch it!
2012	"LOUD - Triceratops"	Oron Aiche	Watch it!
2012	"LOUD - Station 42"	Oron Aiche	Watch it!
2013	"LOUD Doco"	Ben Kirschenbaum	Watch it!
