= Ozora Festival =

Hungarian arts festival

O.Z.O.R.A.
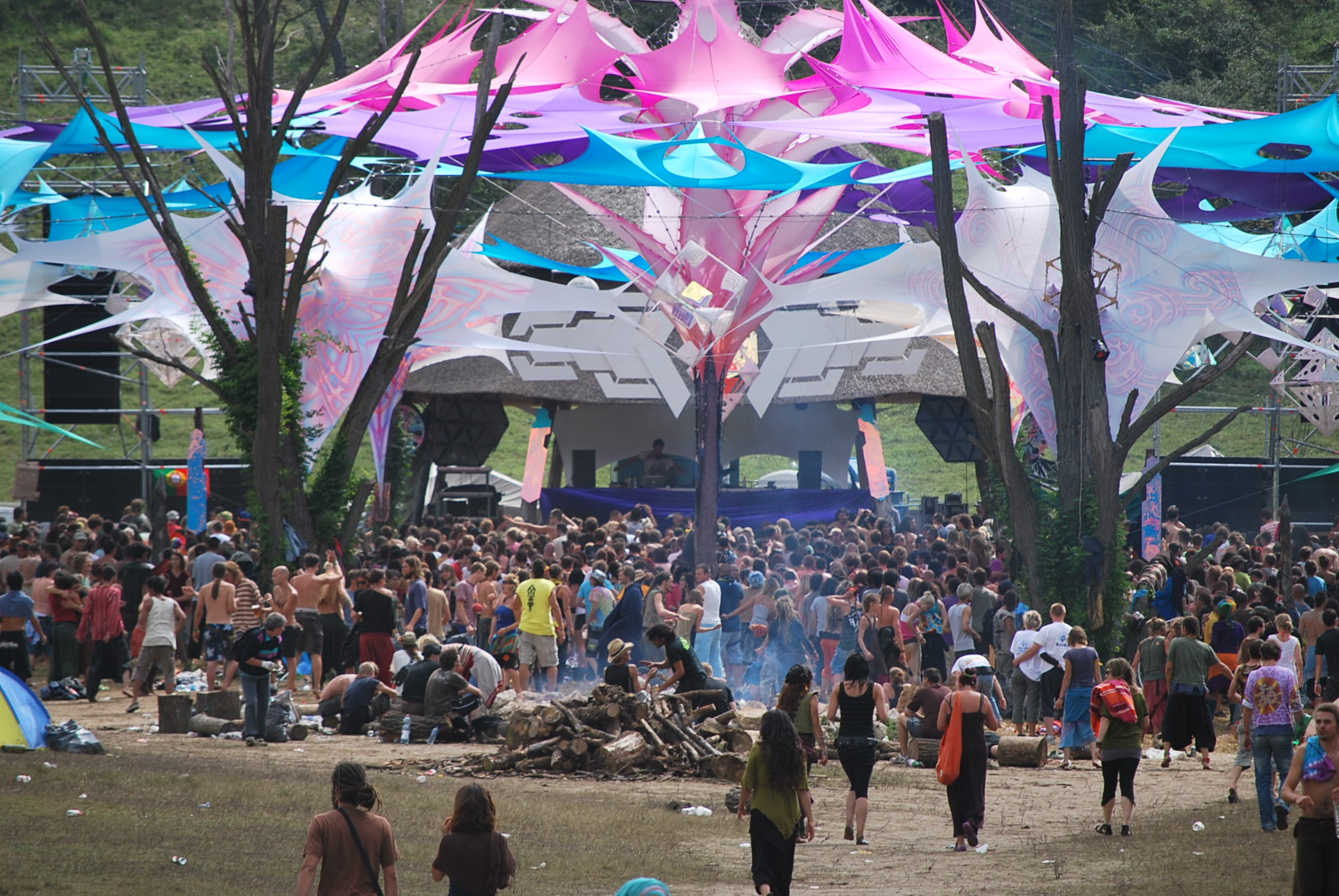
- Ozora Festival 2010.
- Genre: Electronic music, psychedelic trance
- Locations: Dádpuszta, Hungary
- Years active: 2004–present
- Attendance: 30,000 (official); 60,000-70,000 (de facto)
- Website: ozorafestival.eu

The Ozora Festival, stylised as O.Z.O.R.A., is an annual transformational festival and arts festival near the Hungarian village of Ozora.

== History and growth ==
The festival has been held on an estate in Ozora near the small village of Dádpuszta every year since 2004 except in 2020 and 2021, when cancelled due to the Covid-19 pandemic.

The first modern music festival held in Ozora was called Solipse and took place during the Solar eclipse of August 11, 1999. Solipse had a sequel in Zambia 2001, but in Ozora did not get a sequel until the first Ozora Festival was held in 2004.

The Ozora is, with Solar Festival, one of the two sizeable transformational festivals in Hungary. One of the largest psychedelic trance festivals in Europe, Ozora is similar to the Boom Festival in Portugal, Burning Man in United States, and Fusion Festival in Germany, who also reach more than 40,000 visitors every year.

Attendees can listen to a variety of live music spread across the festival grounds and can also partake in activities like yoga sessions, art workshops, lectures, circus/theatre performances, and much more.

Due to its success, several one-day spin-offs from the Ozora Festival have been held in several other countries such as Tokyo, Japan, Paris, France, Mexico and São Paulo, Brazil.

== Reception ==
Ozora is considered one of the "leading festivals" around the world, "one of the largest gatherings of trance and psychedelic music in the world", and according to Trax Magazine "the principal hub of psytrance culture in Europe". La Dernière Heure likened Ozora to an "ecological Tomorrowland with the Peace & Love atmosphere of a 21st-century Woodstock".

== Gallery ==
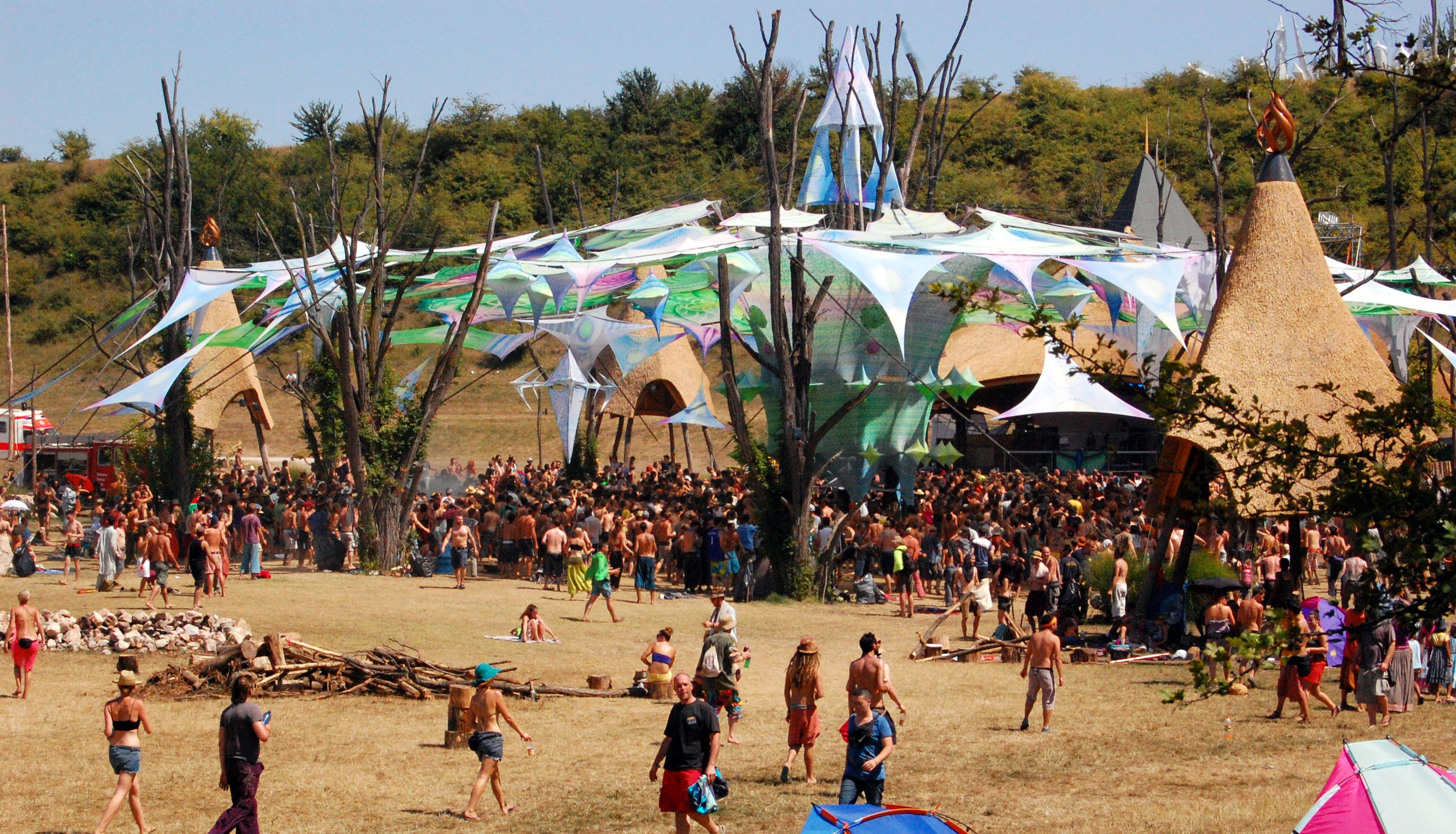
Main stage at day 2013

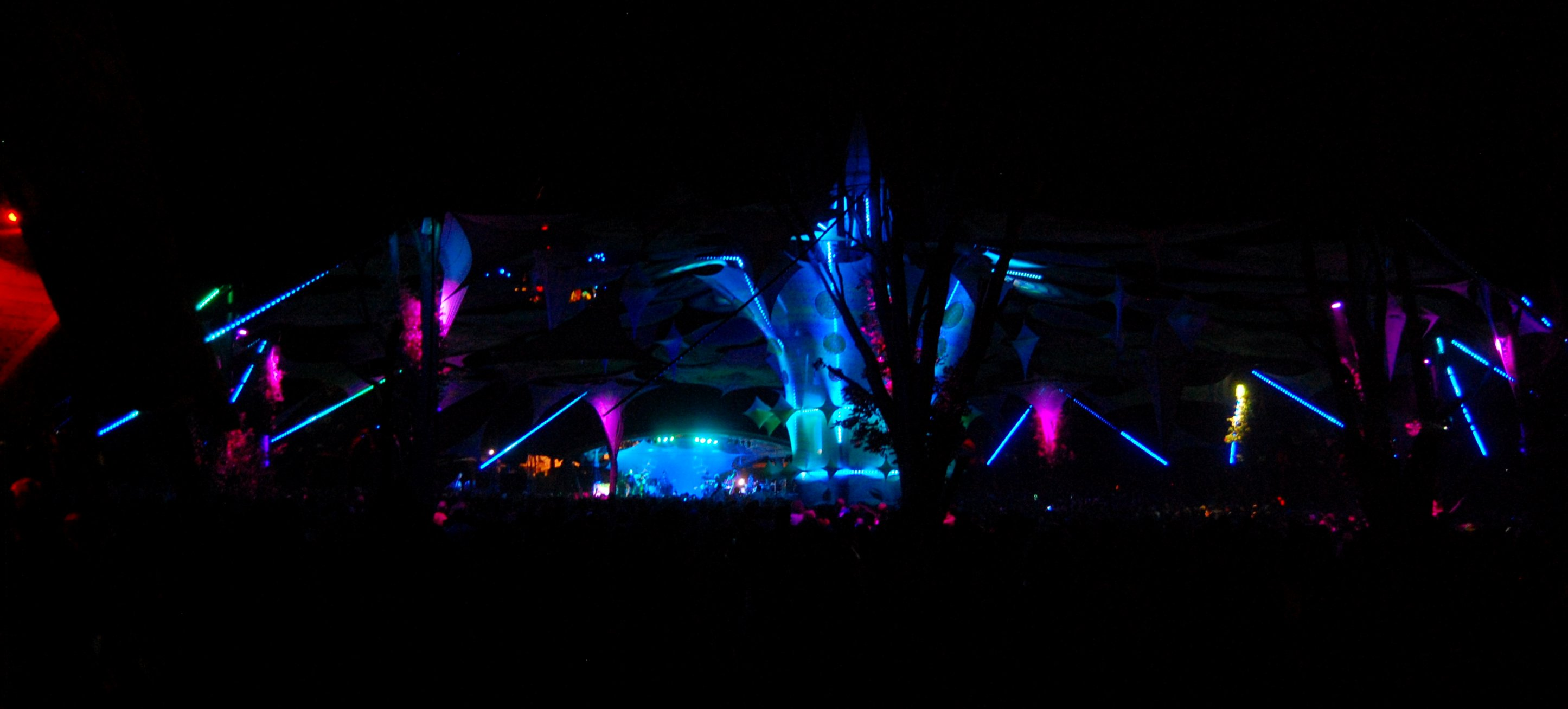
Main stage at night 2013

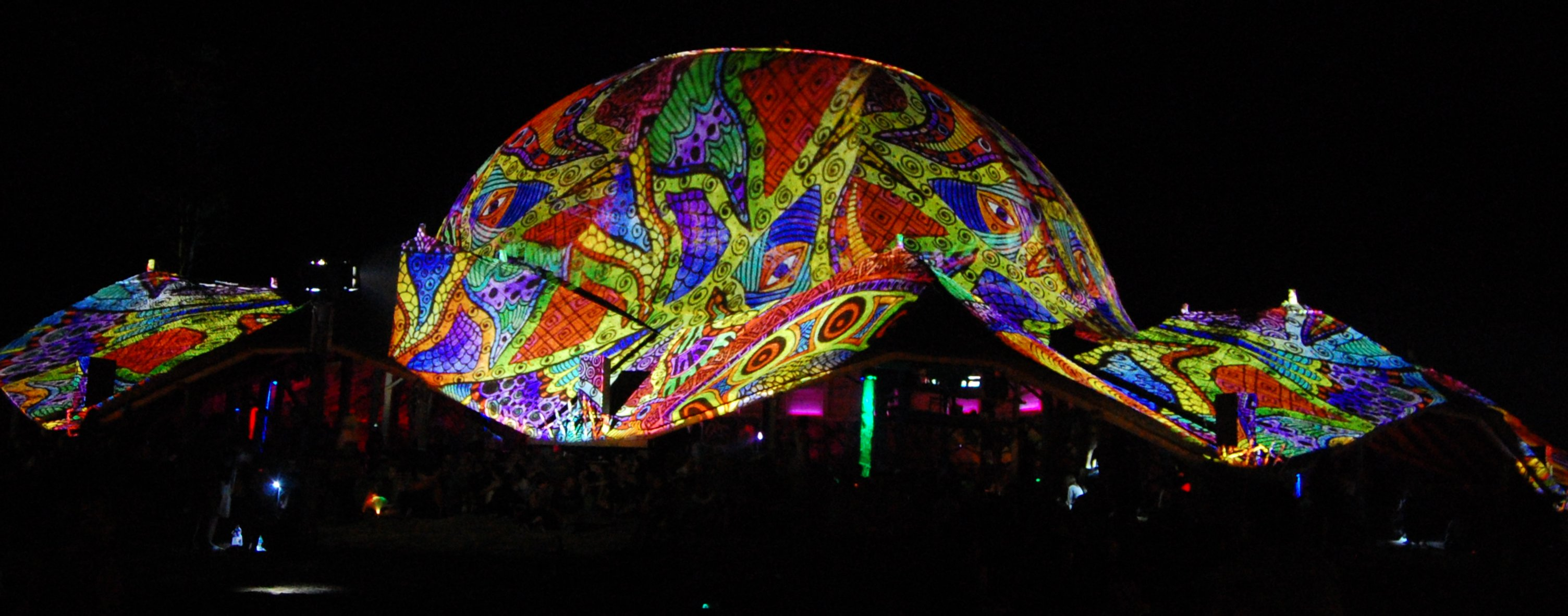
Chillout stage 2013

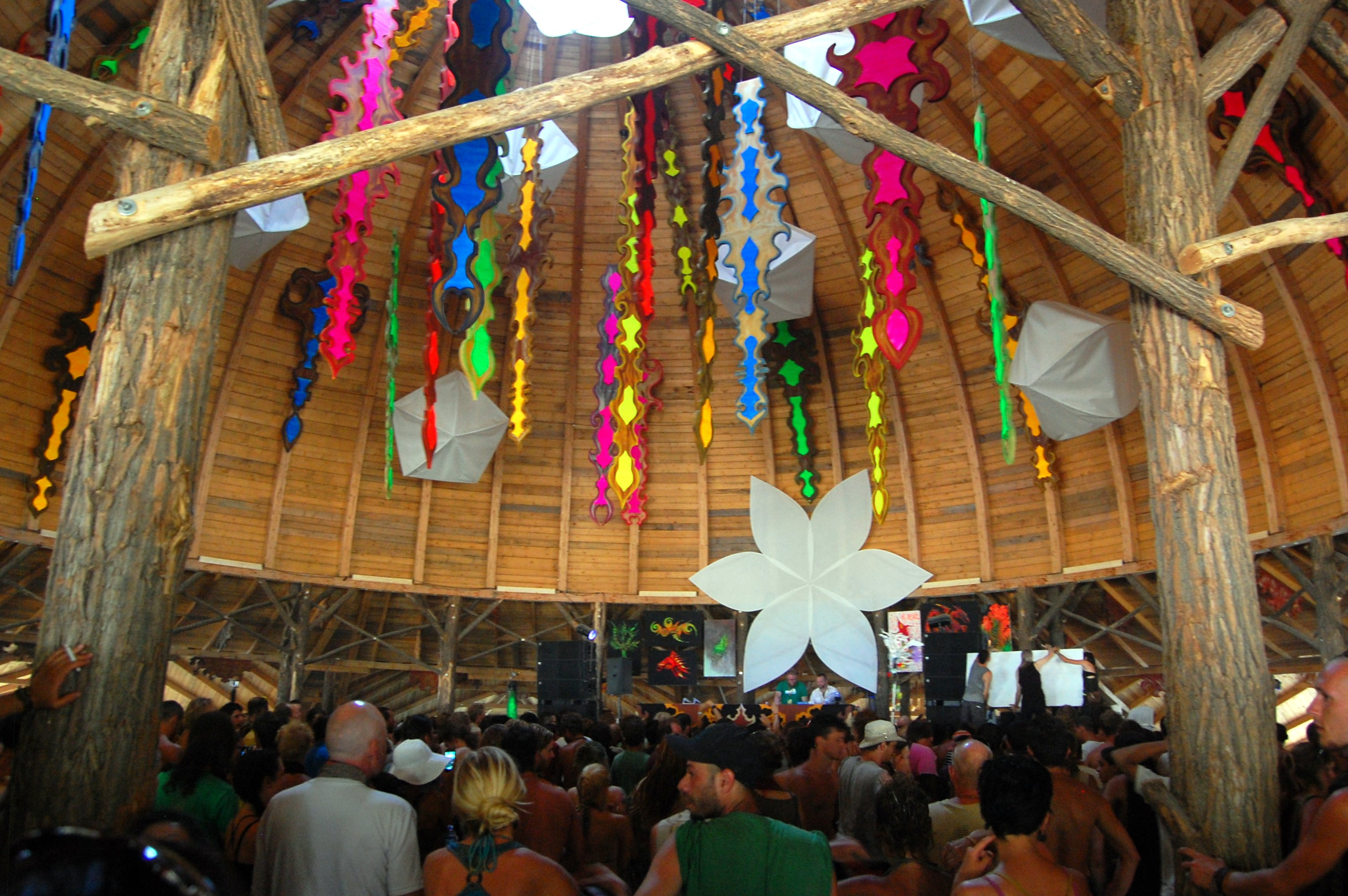
Carbon Based Lifeforms performing in 2013

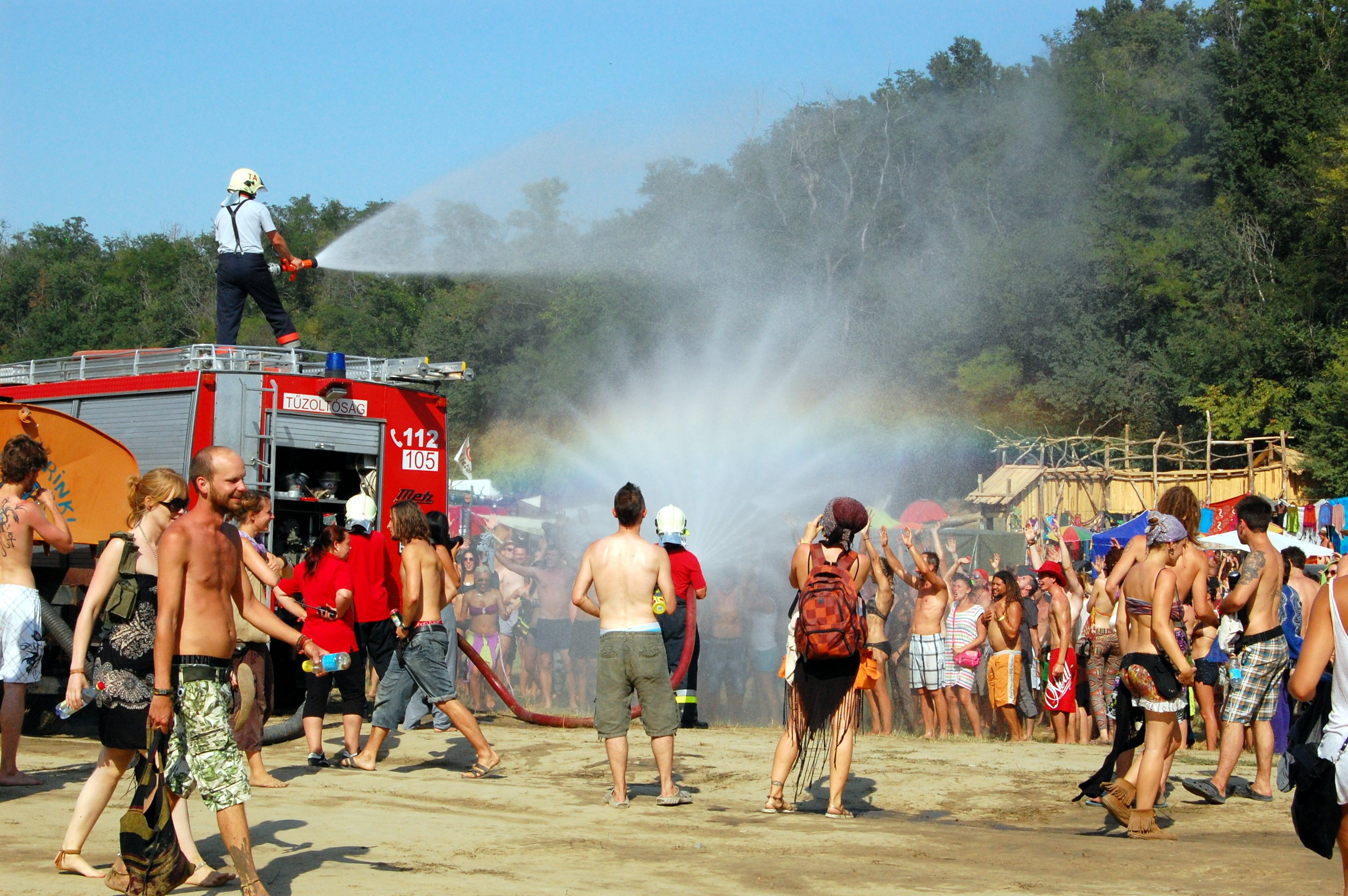
Firefighters cooling dancers off

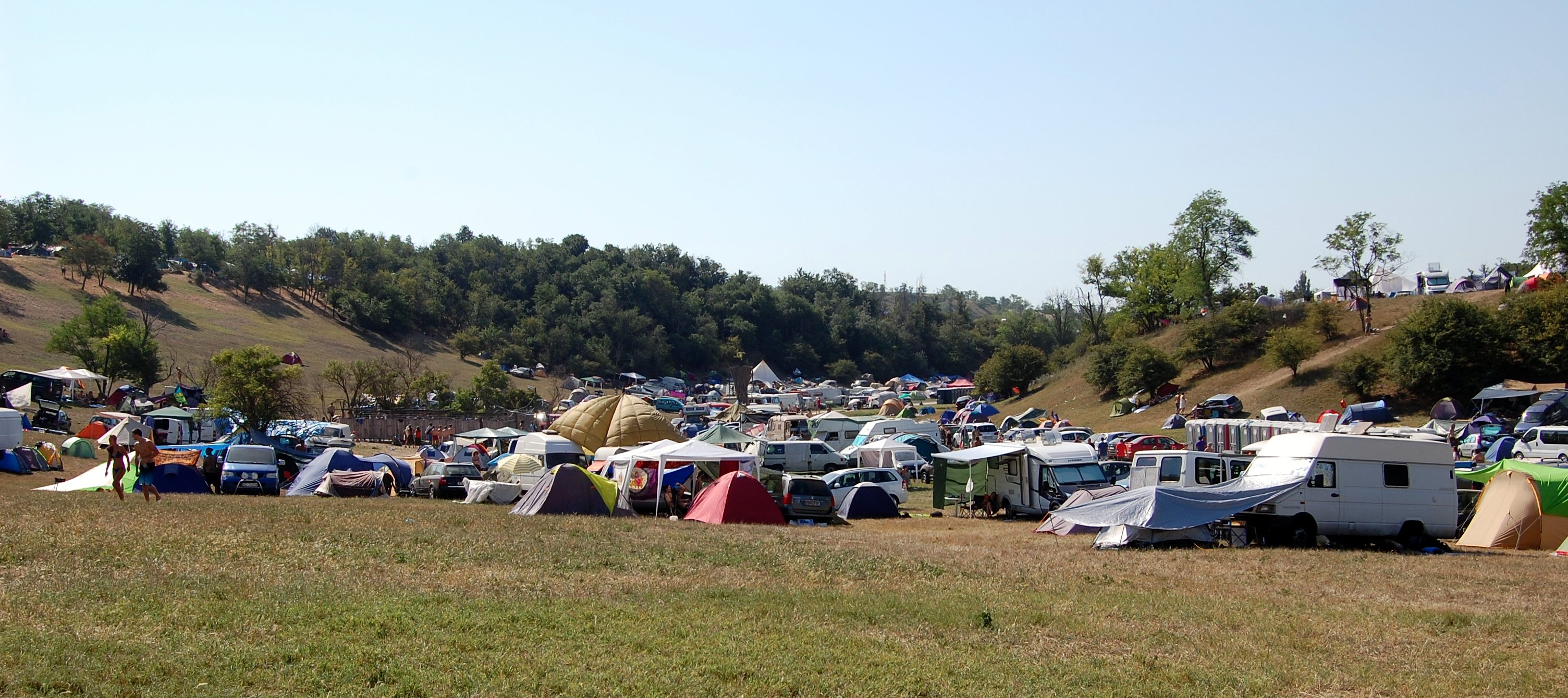
Camping site

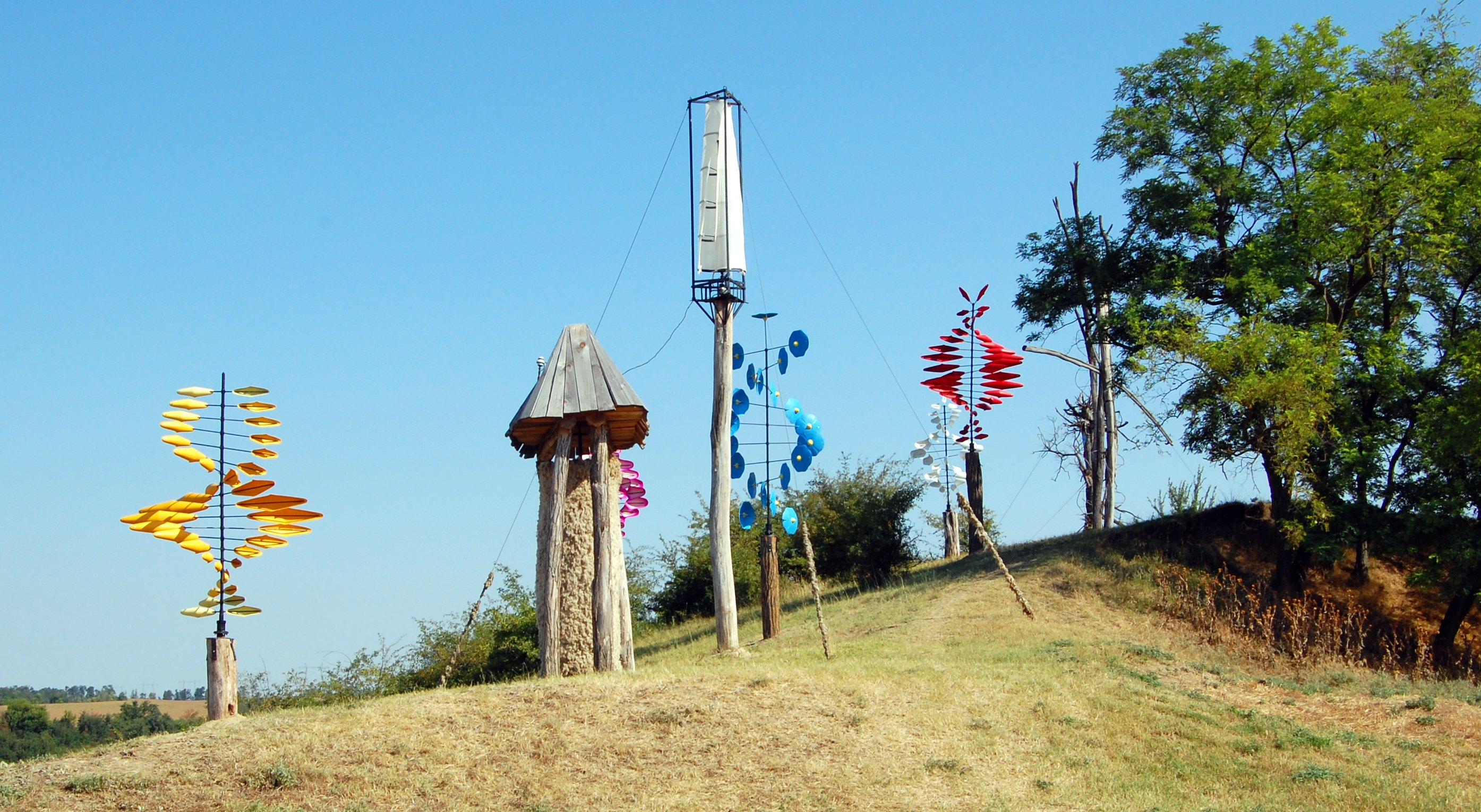
Artistic decorations

== See also ==
- Full Moon Party
- Psy-Fi
- Rainbow Serpent Festival
- SkyGravity Festival
- Subsonic Music Festival
- List of electronic music festivals
