= SkyGravity Festival =

SkyGravity
- Genre: Electronic dance music, psytrance, goa, full on, suomi, progressive and break trance, but also ambient, dub, downtempo, idm, electronica, experimental, and reggae
- Locations: Ukraine (Crimea, near Evpatoria)
- Years active: 2005-2009
- Website: SkyGravity Festival Official Website

SkyGravity is international electronic dance music festival in Ukraine (Crimea, near Evpatoria). Featuring music genres are psytrance, goa, full on, suomi, progressive and break trance, but also ambient, dub, downtempo, idm, electronica, experimental, and reggae.

== See also ==
- List of electronic music festivals
