= Round 1 =

Round 1 may refer to:

- Round 1 (EP), a 2011 EP by C-REAL
- "Round 1" (song), a 2010 song by Dalmatian
- Round 1, an album by Eraser vs Yöjalka
- Round One (TV series), an upcoming Thai boys' love television series.
- Round One Corporation, a Japan-based amusement store chain.

== See also ==
- Round One: The Album, an album by Roy Jones Jr.
