= Eraser vs Yöjalka =

Suomisaundi-style psytrance music project

Eraser vs Yöjalka (also known as EvsY) is a Suomisaundi-style psytrance music project from Helsinki, Finland. The musicians are Julius Lehmuskallio (Eraser) and Simo Ojala (Yöjalka). Both studied music and classical instruments, went to goa parties since 1994 and started making music together in 2000. Since the beginning they' ve been interested in making innovative and always forward going psytrance, sucking influences from heavy, funk, classical and electronic music. They' ve released two albums and one EP on Helsinki-based record label Exogenic Records. The third album, Lords of the Liverdance and fourth album Virtuosi di Quosi were released by Australian record label Faerie Dragon 2006 and 2009.

Eraser vs Yöjalka has played in many many Finnish parties, as well as performing in Russia, Lithuania, Ukraine, Belgium, Israel, Turkey, Great Britain, Sweden, Denmark, Japan and USA. The group has also performed at events outside Finland as part of its international activities.

== History ==
Tarinat was reviewed by Trance.net.

Lords of the Liverdance was reviewed by Trance.net and Sonic Energy.

== Discography ==
- Sense Melter (12" EP, Exogenic Records, 2001)
- Round 1 CD Exogenic Records, 2002)
- Tarinat CD Exogenic Records, 2003)
- Lords of the Liverdance CD Faerie Dragon Records, 2006)
- Virtuosi Di Quosi CD Faerie Dragon Records, 2009)
- Evsylocybine CD www.ektoplazm.com, 2010
- 2070's Shock CD Stereohemia Records, 2020
- Haltya & EvsY "Space Travellers" CD Stereohemia Records 2025

=== Compilations ===
- "Headache" - Fusion vs Confusion (Eraser, Exogenic Records, 1999)
- "Ranblax" - Beats and Beyond (Yöjalka, Surreal Audio, 2000)
- "Hattivatti" – Custom File (Exogenic Records, 2002)
- "Reunion" – Trance of Scandinavia (T.O.S., 2003)
- "Jos Metsään Haluat Mennä Nyt" - (www.antiscarp.com, 2003)
- "That Was Then This Is Now" - (www.antiscarp.com, 2004)
- "A Holy Man Spat Beer On My Gear" – Funland Boogie Files (Space Boogie Productions, 2006)
- "Just Looking for the Best Pieces of this Puzzle" – No Tone Unstirred (Faerie Dragon, 2007)
- "A Morning Story" (feat. Haltya) – No Tone Unstirred (Faerie Dragon, 2007)
- "Arraknophobia" – Dream Theatre (Cosmic Theatre, 2007)
- "Dreamatics" (feat. Ocelot) – Dream Theatre (Cosmic Theatre, 2007)
- "Tanza Toleranza" - Eye Sea Animals (Nullzone Records, 2007)
- "Himolaskijan Pitkät Nousut" - Spoked Weird (Adama Records, 2008)
- "90`s Hangover" - Welcome to Umpo (Jolly Fill Records, 2008)
- "Fennomaniacs Delight" - Organic Circuitry (www.ektoplazm.com, 2008)
- "Ugro Shamanistic Movez" - Shamanisma (Spacebaby Records, 2008)
- "Don´t Dust My Cosmos" - Humants (Sanaton Records, 2008)
- "Who Makes" - Hectic Dialect (Adama Records, 2009)
- "Psychoactivitiez" - "Long Space Distortion" (Apoxina Records, 2009)
- "Rouhe-Eemelin Retket" - "L.S.D." (Apoxina Records, 2009)
- "Back to Past" - "L.S.D." (Apoxina Records, 2009)
- "Take It Acid Is" - "Energies Around" (Mind Expansion Records, 2009)
- "Hehkulandia" - "Idiosynth Trickery" (Faerie Dragon Records, 2010)
- "Boozy`s Funky Odeur" - "Idiosynth Trickery" (Faerie Dragon Records, 2010)
- "Headbanger`s Wall" - "Tales from the Twilight" (Psytraveller Crew, 2011)
- Corelectronics - Casual Freaks (compiled by DJ Unitone, Sunstation Records, 2012)
- Fennougric Tragedy (Adelic Records, 2019)

== See also ==
- Psychedelic trance
- Suomisaundi
