= Wetyourself =

Nightclub event in London, England

Wetyourself! is a nightclub event that held at London nightclub Fabric and was launched in 2007. They have an EDM record label called WetYourSelf! Recordings that launched in 2010.

== History ==
WetYourSelf! was founded by Jacob Husley and Peter Pixzel in 2007. The club was held at the venue Aquarium for two years and in 2009 moved to Fabric, which was held on Sunday nights. The club promotes LGBTQI culture and queer parties. It features local and worldwide electronic music DJs as well as live performances. The style of music played is generally house, minimal and techno.

In 2016, they celebrated their 9th birthday with Steve Lawler spinning. Later in 2016, WetYourSelf! closed for a period of 3 months due to closure of Fabric, as a result of drug overdoses. After reopening it was back at the venue Aquarium temporarily.

In February 2017, WetYourself! celebrated their 10th year anniversary, with over 500 events held to date. Deejays Barac, Cristi Cons, and the founders Husley and Pixzel played at the event.

In 2018, the WetYourself! moved to a monthly time slot at Fabric.

In February 2024, WetYourSelf! celebrated their 17 year anniversary at Fabric with the founders Husley and Pixzel present. By this time over 600 WetYourSelf! events had been held at Fabric.

=== WetYourSelf! Recordings ===
WetYourSelf! Recordings was founded in 2010. It features a roster of electronic musicians and deejays. the founders Husley and Pixzel are themselves on the roster. Some of the other artists on the roster include: Marc Houle, Chris Liebing, Minilouge, Roman Flugel, Axel Boman, Alex Kid, Alex Under, Minilogue, Miss Kittin, and Kasper Bjorke.

Over the years, the label have done label showcases in Space Ibiza, D.edge in Sao Paulo, Watergate in Berlin and several other clubs.
