= Perfect Stranger (musician) =

Israeli musician, producer and DJ

- Origin: Yad Natan, Israel
- Genres: Psychedelic trance, electronica, Techno (music), Progressive Trance
- Years active: 2006–present
- Labels: Iboga Records, Digital Structures (owner)
- Website: perfectlystrange.com

Perfect Stranger is the stage name of Yuli Fershtat, an Israeli musician, producer and DJ, born in 1970 in Moscow, Russia, moving to Israel at the age of 11.

Fershtat has previously released music under guise of 'BLT'. Perfect Stranger is known for his own distinctive sound, characterised by beats and patiently built compositions. His music often defies genres, bridging between progressive trance and techno with a presence of tribal and psychedelic elements. Fershtat released 8 albums, both as 'BLT' and as Perfect Stranger and a long list of 12”, EPs and compilation tracks and compiled few compilations. He is also the owner of the 'Digital Structures' label, which he bought in 2011, and since then has been releasing music by himself and others on it.

== Music ==
=== Musical background and influences ===
Fershtat was surrounded by music since his birth coming from a family of classical pianists, and studied piano from the age of four. He stated as musical influences psychedelic progressive rock, such as King Crimson, Genesis (band), Jethro Tull (band) dipped in some hard rock, such as Led Zeppelin & Deep Purple and some Blues.

He also mentioned Jean Michel Jarre’s Oxygène as critical to his musical development and interest in electronic music. In 1992/93 he visited India and Goa and discovered Electronic Psychedelic music (which he hated till that time and greatly admired since). Another visit to Goa in 1994/95 solidified his interest in Goa Trance and Psychedelic Trance. During these years, Fershtat did not write music but was traveling the world and playing guitar, jamming with other musicians he met on the road.

=== Earl years - BLT ===
Fershtat started producing after his friends bought him a synthesizer for his 27th birthday. Intuitively he was drawn to produce psychedelic trance since he was very much involved with it at the time and felt close to the rhythms and the atmosphere that it produced, and believing that tribal music such as psychedelic trance is essential for people to unite. He chose the name BLT, which stood for a favourite sandwich of his, to show a lack of ego in music, and that the name itself and what it says are not the important thing, as a kind of antithesis to blasting names, which a lot of groups use, especially in the trance scene. The first BLT album Alchemic Anecdote was released on the Tel Aviv-based label 'Krembo Records' in 1999. His 2nd album, Presence was released on 'HOM-Mega Productions' in the following year. BLT 3rd album, God is Love, featured more down-tempo music, with groovy and more complex rhythms, and was released in 2002, also on 'HOM-Mega Productions'. During that time period Fershtat started working with Danni Makov - former drummer of Nikmat HaTraktor, an Israeli rock band, and one of the most important drummers in Israeli Rock. Together the two put on a live show, where the drummer play part of the set, that now felt more alive. Afterwards the duo extended their work and put out a 4th BLT album, Anything U Want on the label Tokyo Dance in 2004.

=== Perfect Stranger ===
In 2005 Fershtat decided to bring an end to the BLT project as he no longer citing lack of overseas bookings and his interest in Acupuncture and Chinese medicine as the main reasons. Then Michael Abel-Larsen, one of the owners of Iboga Records, suggested he produce music with slower BPM tempo. He chose the name Perfect Stranger because of a Goa track by that name by Sandman and the Deep Purple song of the same name. The first Perfect Stranger album, Learning = Change was released in the Danish record label Iboga Records, in 2006, and a remixes/collaborations album named Changed was released the year after and featured some of the most important artists in the progressive trance world at the time, including Atmos, Vibrasphere, Ace Ventura and Antix, who remixed some of Perfect Stranger tracks, while he remixed some of theirs. Free Cloud, the third Perfect Stranger's album, and Fershtat`s seventh album altogether, was released late in 2008, and is the album that brought him worldwide attention that crossed genres and scenes and is considered by many to be his best album yet. The inspiration for the album title was based on David Bowie`s song, as Fershtat claimed he " felt like that Wild Eyed Boy from Free Cloud, that David Bowie used to sing about 35 years ago". Free Cloud was characterized by monotone, "technoidic feel", and cross over between genres as Fershtat used the best parts in from the genres that inspired him, mostly techno.

Perfect Stranger’s fourth album, Leap of Faith came out in 2012, also on Iboga Records. The album consists of 3 CDs. The 1st containing new compositions including collaborations with Eat Static, Liquid Soul & Loud; the 2nd consists of new versions and live edits to already released tracks and the 3rd is a recording of a live set at the Indigo Festival, at the Sea of Galilee, Israel, in May 2012. Throughout the years Perfect Stranger has performed live and as a DJ in many leading electronic music festivals worldwide. Thus, Perfect Stranger played Glade Festival UK in 2008 and 2009, Symbiosis Gathering in California at 2009, 2012, 2013. Perfect Stranger played most of Europe`s trance festivals including Boom Festival in Portugal where he played in every edition since 2010, Antaris Project in 2010 and 2012, Ozora Festival in 2012, and many more. Perfect stranger is also very popular in Australia, playing there at the Rainbow Serpent Festival in 2009, 2011 and 2015, as well as in Maitreya Festival in 2010 and 2014, Strawberry Fields Festival 2011 and 2012, Subsonic Festival in 2011 & 2013 and the Eclipse Festival in 2012. He also performed extensively in big festivals in Central and South America including Universo Paralello Festival in Brazil 2006, 2007, 2008, 2009, 2013, as well as in festivals in South Africa, New Zealand, Canada and many more.

Perfect Stranger has released four full-length albums between 2006 and 2012, and twenty one singles and EPs in the same period. His tracks have been released on a number of record labels including Iboga Records, Flow Records, Tribal Vision, Echoes, Digital Structures and more.

== Discography - BLT ==
=== Albums ===
- Alchemic Anecdote (1999), Krembo Records
- Presence (2000), HOM-Mega Productions
- God is Love (2002), HOM-Mega Productions
- Anything U Want [w/ Danni Makov] (2004), Tokyo Dance

=== Singles & EPs ===
- This Is Not / Gingischana / Pulp Fiction (1999), Krembo Records
- Gravy For The Brain (2000), Balloonia Ltd.
- God is Love (2002), Iboga Records
- News (2004), Iboga Records
- Patterns Of (Remixes) [w/ Danni Makov] (2008), Iboga Records

=== Appearances ===
- Soul Sacrifice (1997), Various - The Forum
- Lemon (1999), D.J Zoo-B - Psychedelic Krembo Selected Tunes Part 4
- Beat Manifesto (2000), Various - UFS (Unidentified Forms Of Sound) Chapter # Two: Psychological Disorder
- Clear Vision (2000), Various - IsrAliens 2, Bizzaro, Various - Psychedelic Trance 2001 Volume 1
- Human Cube Factory (2000), Xerox - In My Brain
- Clear of Vision (2001), Various - Virtual Trance Vol. 2
- White Lotus [feat. Gidi Hovek Olam] (2001), Various - Rolling Synthochords
- Rat In My Kitchen [w/ Future Prophecy] (B.L.T. Rmx) (2001), Various - Full On Volume 5
- Bass Tah (2001), Various - IsrAliens 3: Conflict
- Cruise Control (2002), Various - Goa Volume 2
- Froggy Business (2002), Various - Ectoplasma
- The Calling (2002), Various - U.F.S 3 - Unidentified Forms Of Sound
- If You Call It, It Will Come [w/ Digital Manta] (2002), Various - Under Construction 2 - Re:Construct
- Purple Lotus [feat. Gidi Hovek Olam] (2002), Gidi Hovek Olam - New Frontiers
- BLT (2002), Various - Generations
- Screwdriver (2002), Various - Amalgamated Amalgamation
- The Door Part I [feat. DJ Nadi] (2002) - Various - Travelocity
- Cruise Control (2002), Sesto Sento - B.P.M - Bionic Pulse Method
- Tale Of A Snail [w/ Morax] (2003), Various - Frequent Flyers
- The Rain Song [w/ Danni Makov] (2004), Various - Goa Volume 9
- Subway [w/ Elysium] (2004), Various - Urban Legends
- Clear Vision (PsyCraft Remix) (2004), Various - Goa 2004 Vol. 2 & Various - Mental Case
- The Slapper (2004), Mapusa Mapusa & Laureth - Irresistible Meltdown 3
- Implant [w/ Morax] (Perfect Stranger Remix) (2005), Various - Globalize
- Anything U Want [w/ Danni Makov] (Zen Mechanics Remix) (2005), Ganje, Duniya & Rush
- Maze (2005), Various - dtect Volume 2
- Space Boogie [feat. DJ Nadi] (2006), Various - Goa 2006 Vol. 3
- Space Boogie [feat. DJ Nadi] (Aerospace Remix) (2006), DJ Huda-G - G-Spot & Various - Hexagon Experience Chapter
- SPO [w/ 40%] (2007), Various - Goa-Head Volume
- Six Feet Under (Perfect Stranger Rmx) (2007), Various - Global Goa Trance Network
- Patterns Of [w/ Danni Makov] (A Balter Extended Version) (2008), Emok & Banel - Set:8 - Electronic Ballroom & DJ Mikadho - Goa Beach Volume 8
- Suspended Animation (2009), DJ Edoardo - Neurology Volume:3
- Patterns Of [w/ Danni Makov] (A Balter & Eitan Reiter Remix) (2011), Emok - Best Of My Sets vol 02
- Six Feet Under (Perfect Stranger Live Mix) (2011), Banel - Best Of My Sets
- Monkey & The Rabbit (Egorythmia Remix) (2011), Vaishiyas - Progressive Psytrance Picks Vol. 07
- Monkey + The Rabbit Shoulder (2011), DJ Microstar - Special Blend Vol.01

== Discography - Perfect Stranger ==
=== Albums ===
- Learning = Change (2006), Iboga Records
- Changed (2007), Iboga Records
- Free Cloud (2008), Iboga Records
- Leap of Faith (2012), Iboga Records
- Eleven (2018), Iboga Records
- Broadcasting & Receiving (2023), Iboga Records

=== Compilations ===
- Set/4 - Essentials by Yuli Fershtat (2005), Iboga Records
- Hibernation by Yuli Fershtat (2006), Iboga Records

=== Singles & EPs ===
- Ode Ao Sol Remixes (2008), Beef Records
- Clear Vision 07' EP (2008), Iboga Records
- Stardust EP (2009), Iboga Records
- Forty Two (2010), Digital Structures
- Engines On (2010), Digital Structures
- Clear Vision 07-Remixes (2010), Echoes Records
- Lizard (2010), Echoes Records
- Prata Da Casa EP (2010), Flow Vinyl
- The Bite (2011), Digital Structures
- Slope (2011), Digital Structures
- OUCH! (2011), Digital Structures
- Koltun Remixes (2012), Digital Structures
- Twist In Hell (2012), Iboga Records
- Leap Of Faith EP (2013), Iboga Records
- Sad Paradise Remixing Perfect Stranger (2013), Iboga Records
- Pick N' Roll (2013), Digital Structures
- Perfect Stranger Remixes (2013), Iboga Records
- Slope 2014 (2014), Digital Structures
- Perfect Stranger Remixes (2014), Iboga Records
- Been There Done That (2014), Digital Structures
- Himmelrich (2014), Iboga Records

=== Appearances ===
- It’s All About (2005), Tony Comanti - Grand Avenue
- What's The Lineup (2005), Banel & Emok - Set/5 - Summer Collection
- Nobody's Perfect (2005), Yuli Fershtat - Set/4 - Essentials
- Diamond In The Rough [w/ Behind Blue Eyes] (2006), Various - Goa 2006 Vol. 4
- Truth [w/ Emok] (2006), DJ Bim - Goa 2006 Vol.5
- Starter (2006), Various - Digital Age
- Consequences (2006), Various - Tantra Trance Vol. 2 & Various - Progressive Movement & Various - Progressive Beats
- Perfect Ace [w/ Ace Ventura] (2006), Various - Think Different & Various - Goa Love Vol. 1
- Breeze (2006), Various - :In:Deep:An:Dance: 2006 & Various - Goabeats
- Diamond In The Rough [w/ Behind Blue Eyes] (Perfect Stranger Edit) (2006), Various - Daily Basis
- Diamond In The Rough [w/ Behind Blue Eyes] (BBE Mix) (2006), Emok & Banel - Dawn Summer Collection Vol. 2
- Bliss (2006), Various - Goa Girl Volume 3 & Yuli Fershtat - Hibernation
- Eyes Wide Open [w/ Sunseek] (2007), Various - Progressive Goa Trance Volume 6 & Vedant & Odiseo - Switch
- Perfect Ace [w/ Ace Ventura] (Atmos Remix) (2007), Emok & Banel - Progressive Goa Trance Volume 5 & Various - Diamonds
- Eyes Wide Open [w/ Sunseek] & Hyperdrive (Behind Blue Eyes Rmx) (2007), Various - Yellow Sunshine Explosion New Releases !!! & Behind Blue Eyes - CPH
- The Medicine (2007), DJ Zombi - Drums And Roses
- Mountain High [w/ Morax] (2007), Various - Trancendental Journey Volume 1 & DJ Bim - Goa 2008 Vol.1
- Ode Ao Sol [feat. Pena] (2007), Citizen aka Zen Mechanics - Uncharted
- Clear Vision 07 (Fiord Remix) (2007), Treavor Moontribe - Set:9 Desert Selections
- Morning Blues (Ace Ventura Remix) (2008), Ace Ventura - Re:Boot
- Morning Blues (Ace Ventura Remix) (2008), DJ Tulla & Der Bus - Goa Beach Volume 10
- Stardust (Felguk Remix) (2009), Emok & Lenny Ibizarre - Set 10 - CPH-IBZ
- Bliss (Life Style Remix) (2009), Life Style - RMX
- Wild Cave [w/ Liquid Soul] (2009), Liquid Soul - Cocktails & DJ Martin - Freak The Tune Vol. 2 & Various - Progressive Psytrance Pieces Volume 3
- The Medicine (Khainz Rmx) (2009), Koszki - Blue Addiction - The Koszki Dose
- Easy (2009), Various - Top Picks
- Ode Ao Sol [feat. Pena] (Stephan Hinz Remix) (2009), Various - Budenzauber Volume Eight - 25 Minimal Techno Tracks
- Stardust (Moonbeam Remix) (2009), Emok & Chris-A-Nova - Progressive Goa Trance Volume 9
- Dr. Feelgood (Blackout Remix) (2009), Blackout - New Perspective Vol. 2
- Living In The Past (Magitman Remix Part 2) (2010), Various - Vanguard 3 & Various - Haiti Appeal Project
- Free Cloud (Perfect Stranger & A Balter Remix) (2010), Various - Hot Picks II
- Free Cloud (Sensient Rmx) (2010), Woodsman - Expansion Pack
- Prata Da Casa (2010), Pena & Nano-Mechanic - Uncharted Vol.2
- Easy (Moosfiebr Remix) (2011), Various - Kinky Beats - Zürich Night Edition Vol. 3
- Perfect Hook [feat. Captain Hook] 2011, Captain Hook - Human Design & Various - Set: 12 - Iboga Trance Classics
- A Musquito Bit My Leg (Manuel De La Mare Remix) (2011), Emok & Banel* - Reconstruction
- Koltun (2011), Emok - Best Of My Sets vol 02
- A Mosquito Bit My Leg (2011), Dj Mizoo - Timegate 2012
- Lizard [w/ Eitan Reiter] (2011), Treavor Moontribe - Between Worlds
- Easy (Ruls & Navarro Remix) (2011), Banel - Best Of My Sets
- Slope (Hedflux Remix) (2012), Various - At The Crossroads Vol.2
- Slope (2012), Various - At The Crossroads Vol.01
- Sweet Water Dolphin (Motion Drive Remix) (2012), Cubixx & Jensson - Selection 2012 & DJ Prozak - Goa Volume 50
- Razorblade [w/ Ritmo] (2012), Nitrodrop - Flexible
- Sweet Water Dolphin (Motion Drive Remix) (2012), Cubixx - Carrots & Stick Vol. 2
- Ode Ao Sol [feat. Pena] (Liquid Soul Remix) (2012), Liquid Soul - Groove Attack
- Free Cloud (2012 Baby Grand Mix) & Carnalisimo (2013), Various - Set: 14 - Iboga Records Classics
- No. 1 (Mr. What? Remix) (2013), Various - Set: 18 - Iboga Trance Classics
- Leap Of Faith (Human Element Remix) (2013), Various - Set: 17 - Iboga Trance Classics
- Leap Of Faith (2013), Various - Set: 15 - Iboga Trance Classics
- Razorblade [w/ Ritmo] (2013), Captain Hook - Best Of My Sets vol 09
- Perfect Hook [w/ Captain Hook] (Riktam & Bansi Remix) (2013), Captain Hook - Akashic Library
- Sweet Water (N.A.S.A. Remix) (2013), N.A.S.A. - Remixes
- Twist In Hell [w/ Yotopia] (Talpa Remix) (2014), Yotopia & Talpa - B2B & Mr. What? - Best Of My Sets Vol 13
- Stardust ( Eitan Reiter Remix) (2014), Various - At The Crossroads Vol. 03
- Perfect Hook (Joujouka Remix) (2014), Various - S.U.N. Festival - Interconnected
- Time Warp (Joujouka Remix) (2014), Gaudium - Best Of My Sets Vol 10
- Our Time [w/ Liquid Soul] (2014), Various - Set: 20 - Iboga Trance Classics
- Himmelrich [w/ Human Element] (2015), Ace Ventura - Goa Session

=== Remixes ===
- BLT & Morax - Implant (Perfect Stranger Remix) (2005), Globalize (Flow Records)
- Ace Ventura – R.I.S.E (Perfect Stranger Remix) (2006), Nuance (Iboga Records)
- Zen Mechanics – Ground Control (Perfect Stranger Remix) (2007), Uncharted (Flow Records)
- Vibrasphere – Sweet September (Perfect Stranger Remix) (2007), Archipelago Remixed (Digital Structures)
- Behind Blue Eyes – The Epitome (Perfect Stranger Remix) (2007), Copenhagen (Iboga Records)
- Maelstrom – Chapster (Perfect Stranger Remix) (2007), The Bomb (Iboga Records)
- Atmos – KNS (Perfect Stranger Remix) (2007), Progressive Goa Trance Vol. 6 (Yellow Sunshine Explosion)
- Ace Ventura – R.I.S.E (Perfect Stranger Remix) (2007), Psypod Volume 1 (Yellow Sunshine Explosion)
- BLT – Six Feet Under (Perfect Stranger Remix) (2007), Global Goa Trance Network (Yellow Sunshine Explosion)
- Morax – Out Of The Blue (Perfect Stranger Remix) (2008), Bakkelit 2.1 (Spiral Trax)
- Morax – Out Of The Blue (Perfect Stranger Remix) (2008), Goa Beach Volume 9 (Yellow Sunshine Explosion)
- LOUD – Subynia (Perfect Stranger Remix) (2008), Chacruna (Echoes Records)
- Liquid Ace – Psychic Experience (Perfect Stranger Remix) (2008), Re:Boot (Iboga Records)
- RPO – Industry Part 2 (Perfect Stranger Remix) (2008), Industry Part 2 EP (Tribal Vision Records)
- Felguk – Guess What (Perfect Stranger Remix) (2009), Guess What (Dongle Records)
- RPO – Industry Part 2 (Perfect Stranger Remix) (2009), VuuV Festival Vol. 2 (Planet BEN Records)
- RPO – Industry Part 2 (Perfect Stranger Remix) (2009), Chronicles IX (Tribal Vision Records)
- Eitan Reiter – Ups & Downs (Perfect Stranger Re-Edit) (2009), Ups & Downs (Iboga Records)
- Liquid Soul – The Reason (Perfect Stranger Remix) (2009), Liquid Soul EP (Iboga Records)
- Liquid Soul – The Reason (Perfect Stranger Remix) (2009), Cocktails (Iboga Records)
- RPO – Industry Part 2 (Perfect Stranger Remix) (2009), Muschitanz Vol. 2 (Planet BEN Records)
- Decoy – Push Button Pony (Perfect Stranger Remix) (2010), Beat Wins (Dance n Dust)
- MUTe – Sensimellia (Perfect Stranger Welcome Sunshine Remix) (2010), Sensimellia (Tribal Vision Records)
- Tristan – Bombscare (Perfect Stranger Small Vagator Mix) (2010), Sonica Compilation Volume II (Sonica Recordings)
- 4D – Stargen (Perfect Stranger Remix) (2010), Stargen EP (4DigitalAudio)
- Eitan Reiter – Ups & Downs (Perfect Stranger Re-Edit) (2010), Emok - Best Of My Sets (Iboga Records)
- Eitan Reiter – Smile (Perfect Stranger Remix) (2010), Smile Dance Remixes (Aleph Zero Records)
- Gai Barone – Astronave (Perfect Stranger Remix) (2010), Astronave (Afterglow)
- A. Balter – Frank (Perfect Stranger Remix) (2010), Frank (Digital Structures)
- LOUD – Engines On (Perfect Stranger Remix) (2010), Engines On (Digital Structures)
- Nyquist – Otagu (Perfect Stranger Remix) (2010), Otagu (Iboga Records)
- Nyquist – Otagu (Perfect Stranger Remix) (2011), Banel - Best Of My Sets (Iboga Records)
- BLT – Six Feet Under (Perfect Stranger Live Mix) (2011), Banel - Best Of My Sets (Iboga Records)
- Eitan Reiter – Smile (Perfect Stranger Remix) (2011), Smile EP (Aleph Zero Records)
- Flippers & Slater – King Of The Night (Perfect Stranger Remix) (2011), King Of The Night EP (Tribal Vision Records)
- Antix – Box Of Birds (Perfect Stranger Remix) (2011), Antix – Best Of Our Sets (Iboga Records)
- RPO – Industry Part II (Perfect Stranger Remix) (2011), Deluxe III Compiled By Don Vitalo (Plusquam)
- LOUD – Sundance (Perfect Stranger Remix) (2011), The Remixes (Nano Records)
- Juno Reactor – Rotorblade (Perfect Stranger Remix) (2011), Inside The Reactor (Metropolis Records)
- Juno Reactor – Rotorblade (Perfect Stranger Remix) (2011), Inside The Reactor (Wakyo Records)
- Antix – Box Of Birds (Perfect Stranger Remix) (2011), Reconstruction (Iboga Records)
- Dayan & John – Stone Cold (Perfect Stranger Remix) (2011), Stone Cold EP (Sounds Of Earth)
- Flippers & Slater – King Of The Night (Perfect Stranger Remix) (2012), Chronicles XI, Part 2: Winter (Tribal Vision Records)
- Max Freegrant – Swing (Perfect Stranger Remix) (2012), Swing EP (Freshin)
- Tristan – Bombscare (Perfect Stranger Small Vagator Mix) (2012), Sonica VA Vol.2 Compiled By Gino (Sonica Recordings)
- Sphera & Rocky – The Darkness (Perfect Stranger Remix) (2012), The Darkness EP (Echoes Records)
- ElMute – Atmostrange (Perfect Stranger Remix) (2012), Atmostrange EP (ODN Records)
- ElMute – Atmostrange (Perfect Stranger Remix) (2013), Brain Mapping Vol.1 (ODN Records)
- Felguk – Guess What (Perfect Stranger 2.4 GHz Remix) (2013), Set:14 (Iboga Records)
- Perfect Stranger – Free Cloud (2012 Baby Grand Mix) (2013), Set:14 (Iboga Records)
- Ritmo – Follow Me (Perfect Stranger Remix) (2013), Phase – B (Iono Music)
- Piatto – Not Satisfied (Perfect Stranger Remix) (2013), Not Satisfied EP (IAMT)
- LOUD – Sundance (Perfect Stranger Remix) (2013), Set:17 (Iboga Trance)
- Dayan & John – Stone Cold (Perfect Stranger Remix) (2013), Secret Weapons (Sounds Of Earth)
- Sun Control Species & Behind Blue Eyes – 2nd Sunrise (Perfect Stranger Remix) (2013), Banel 25 Years Anniversary (Iboga Records)
- LOUD – Dustortion (Perfect Stranger Remix) (2013), Banel 25 Years Anniversary (Iboga Records)
- Roy RosenfelD – My Bubble (Perfect Stranger Remix) (2013), Set:16 (Iboga Records)
- Sakorka – All I Wanna Do (Perfect Stranger Remix) (2013), All I Wanna Do EP (Digital Structures)
- Diamandy – Belief System (Perfect Stranger Remix) (2013), Belief System EP (Digital Structures)
- Sleek – Something (Perfect Stranger Remix) (2013), Something EP (Flow Records)
- Captain Hook – Vertebra L2 (Perfect Stranger Remix) (2013), Akashic Library (Iboga Records)
- Ritmo – Follow Me (Perfect Stranger Remix) (2013), Rush Hour – Best Of 2013 (Pharmacy Music)
- Sun Control Species & Behind Blue Eyes – 2nd Sunrise (Perfect Stranger Remix) (2013), Raja Ram’s Pipedreams Vol.2 (TIP Records)
- Sensient – Galaxians (Perfect Stranger Remix) (2013), Galaxians Remixes (Zenon Records)
- Behind Blue Eyes & Sun Control Species - Second Sunrise (Perfect Stranger Remix) (2014), Set:19 (Iboga Records)
- Art Of Trance - Humans (Perfect Stranger Remix) (2014), Humans (Platypus Records)
- Ritmo - Follow Me (Perfect Stranger Remix) (2014), Package (Iono)
- Critical Choice - Roots (Perfect Stranger Remix) (2015), Critical Choice Remixes Pt.1 (Iboga Records)
- Art Of Trance - Humans (Perfect Stranger Remix) (2015), Floating Trance Hymns (House On Wheels)
- Art Of Trance - Humans (Perfect Stranger Remix) (2015), Trance Rapid Vol.12 (Drizzly Records)
- Space Cat & Lish - Dark Horizon (Perfect Stranger Remix) (2015), MVMB - Continuity Vol.1 (Iboga Records)

== Festivals ==
- Glade Festival in UK 2008 and in 2009
- Symbiosis Gathering in California at 2009, 2012 and 2013
- Antaris Project in Germany 2010 and 2012
- Ozora Festival in Hungary 2012
- Boom Festival in Portugal where he played in every edition since 2010
- Rainbow Serpent Festival in Australia 2009, 2011 and 2015
- Maitreya Festival in Victoria, Australia 2010 and 2014
- Strawberry Fields Festival in Victoria, Australia 2011 and 2012
- Subsonic Festival in NSW, Australia 2011 and 2013
- Eclipse Festival in Queensland, Australia 2012
- Sunburn Festival in Goa, India 2011
- Universo Paralello Festival in Brazil 2006, 2007, 2008, 2009, 2013
- Time & Space Festival in Mexico 2012 alongside electronic musician and producer Ellen Allien
- Luminate Festival in New Zealand 2011 and 2015
