= Vibrasphere =

Swedish progressive psytrance music duo

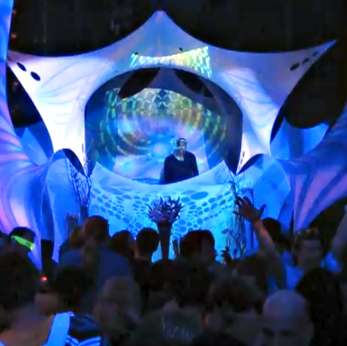
- Vibrasphere

Background information
- Origin: Uppsala, Sweden, Brussels, Belgium
- Genres: progressive trance, downtempo, Psytrance, ambient, Psybient
- Years active: 1998–2010
- Labels: Cloud 99
- Past members: Rickard Berglöf; Robert Elster; Pierre Baekelmans
- Website: www.vibrasphere.com

Vibrasphere was a progressive trance music duo from Uppsala, Sweden and Brussels, Belgium. Its founding members were Rickard Berglöf, Robert Elster and Pierre Baekelmans.

== History ==
Berglöf was previously a member of early Goa group Subcouds and at around the same time Elster had started musical production on an Amiga. After meeting, the pair decided to start studio recordings as Vibrasphere in June 1998.

Elster left the group half a year after the release of their second album, Lime Structure, due to constant touring. Elster was replaced by Pierre Baekelmans a progressive trance musician from brussels. In 2005 Elster rejoined the group, leaving Berglöf still in charge of touring duties. But in the studio, a new musical direction was proposed by Baekelmans. This sound became the signature of vibrasphere from 2006.

Their fourth album, Exploring the Tributaries (2007), took a few more leaps towards progressive, fading the barriers between trance and house music while also featuring dub, downbeat and ambient tracks. Baekelmans left the group in 2009 to compose alone in a project called pitsnake.

In November 2010, Vibrasphere announced it was disbanding.

== Discography ==
- Echo (Spiral Trax, 2000)
- Lime Structure (Digital Structures, 2003)
- Archipelago (Digital Structures, 2006)
- Exploring the Tributaries (Tribal Vision, 2007)
- Lungs of Life (Tribal Vision, 2008)

Vinyl

- The Open Sphere (Psychic Deli, 1999)
- Nowhere (Transient, 1999)
- Mental Mountain (Spiral Trax, 2000)
- Airfield (Acid Casualties, 2001)
- Niño Loco (Dragonfly Records, 2002)
- Stereo Gun (Spiral Trax, 2003)
- Lime Remixes (Digital Structures, 2003)
- Archipelago (Digital Structures, 2006)
- Early Years (Tribal Vision, 2016)

Compilations

- Selected downbeats Vol. 1 (Cloud 99, 2006)
- Selected downbeats Vol. 2 (Cloud 99, 2009)
