= Suomisaundi =

Style of psychedelic trance music

- Stylistic origins: Psychedelic trance; Goa trance
- Cultural origins: Mid-1990s, Finland

Fusion genres
- Progressive suomisaundi

Suomisaundi (English: "Finnish sound"), also known as suomisoundi, suomistyge or spugedelic trance, is a style of psychedelic trance that originated in Finland around the mid-1990s. "Suomisaundi" literally means "Finnish sound" in Finnish, and its biggest proponents are said to be Tim Thick and his label Thixx'n'Dixx.

== History ==
In the early 90s, a party collective Ruskababa introduced Goa trance to a handful of enthusiasts through their covert summertime party activities. The party music was typically played from DAT tapes or even from cassette tapes and included mostly Goan hits from the previous season's parties. Pepe Kosminen was one of the DJs playing these new psychedelic tunes to the Finnish audience in Ruskababa parties.

New party collectives emerged as DJs drew more inspiration from Goa. The first new collective was Smooth Underground which organised the last of its parties in a warehouse in Herttoniemi, with Ville Tikkanen playing Goa trance for the first time in Finland in a more conventional trance setting. After the dismantling of Smooth Underground, another group, Löyhä was formed. Löyhä was the first party collective to put a special focus on promoting locally made music. Inspired by the covert party tradition of Ruskababa and Smooth Underground, the group was determined to push the boundaries of organising unlicensed parties in an urban environment. It was not uncommon for the early organisers to experience issues with the authorities related to the parties.

The first time Suomisaundi reached global circulation was during the 95-96 season in Goa, when DAT tape recordings of early songs produced by Tim Thick became an overnight sensation within the gatekeepers of the underground Goa trance DJ scene. The sounds and themes found in these short FastTracker 2 songs, and the inspiring response they had received globally, became the basic building blocks of the Suomisaundi phenomena.

Arguably the genre-defining Suomisaundi album is the self-published compilation, 'Flippin Bixies', in 1996. It was the first album to directly answer to the rapidly growing need for a new localised sound, that had been created over the previous years by the party collectives and the general popularization of electronic music. The album was named after a private recording studio that was located near Kurvi in Helsinki around mid 90s.

In 1997 Exogenic Records became the first record label to focus on Suomisaundi and approximately during the same time Midiliitto was founded as an association focusing on the advancement of production and commercialisation of Suomisaundi. Pepe Kosminen was the founding Chairman of Midiliitto. Together with Flippin Bixies, Midiliitto counted within its members many of the future international stars of Suomisaundi, including the members of groups like Texas Faggott and Squaremeat.

== 2000s ==
Suomisaundi was initially criticised for its inconsistent quality and lack of production standards, though it became more refined and popular with time. In 2000, Tim Thick launched Thixx'n'Dixx, a website that hosted a massive catalogue of suomisaundi in an easy-to-access format. Thixx'n'Dixx grew so popular that it was mentioned in a pop music program on Finnish national TV. Tim is widely credited for being the first to produce tracks closely resembling the modern Suomisaundi in -94, earning him a cult status within the global Goa trance DJ and party organiser community over the course of the following year.

After site-hosting problems and excessive bandwidth usage, the Thixx'n'Dixx site now operates as a link catalogue to individual artist pages at mikseri.net, which is a Finnish MP3 community for unsigned/independent musicians. Another popular MP3 download site for suomisaundi music is the Antiscarp-website, hosted by members of the Finnish psytrance group Salakavala.

Since 2000, the global interest in Finnish trance has grown significantly, with many Finnish groups touring internationally and performing to a growing global fan base. However, outside Finland, the Suomi-style is still typically considered an eccentricity within the context of the psytrance genre. Most notable suomisaundi audiences outside Finland are in Russia, Ukraine, Japan and Australia. The Japanese label, 6-Dimension Soundz, concentrates almost exclusively on releasing suomi-style trance.

== Genre ==
Steady fanbases in Australia, New Zealand, Japan, Russia and Eastern Europe led to non-Finnish producers creating Finnish style psytrance music around the world.

Suomisaundi is less formulaic than most modern psytrance, with no set rules apart from basic trance elements such as the four-on-the-floor kick drum that has characterized the majority of electronic dance music styles to date. Suomisaundi tracks are usually very melodic and eclectic, typically with heavy influence from early Goa, tribal house and acid trance and as well as—departing from classical psychedelic trance—some degree of influence from funk music (e.g., incorporation of funky horn, guitar, or keyboard loops) oftentimes decorated with sounds and ambience reminiscent of retro video games.

Songs frequently include distorted sampling, layers and combinations of effects, tricky drum fills and breaks, as well as speech samples in Finnish or in English. On many occasions there are forms of strange humor and/or self-irony in the music or in the track titles. Some even describe the suomi-style of psytrance as anarchistic and almost punk in the trance music scene, even dadaist, because the songs are usually very different and progressive (or exploratory) compared to mainstream European psytrance tracks. Conversely, mainstream psychedelic trance comparatively sounds more serious than suomisaundi.

Additionally, suomisaundi bass tends to differ from conventional European psytrance in patch design, equalization, and rhythmic distinction. For example, bass patches tend to be less punchy (i.e., have a slower attack) and often breaks a rule followed by European and Israeli producers: never overlap kick drum and bass notes.
