= Mikseri.net =

Mikseri.net is a free Finnish music-sharing service created by Arto Aaltonen with the help of Miikka Koivuniemi. Independent musicians are allowed to upload their work on their accounts from which other users can download their music for free. Registered users can also review other artists' works. Tracks are uploaded to the site in mp3 format. Mikseri.net is much like the late mp3.com, but with the focus of services towards the musician community rather than consumers. Quite a few popular Finnish artists have launched their careers from mikseri.net; @junkmail, MC Pöly, Chorale and Steen1 to name a few.

== History ==
The first official version of Mikseri.net was released in 27.05.2001 after half a year of developing. After the release of the second official version the service started to grow rapidly.
