= Rainbow Spirit Festival =

Arts, music and lifestyle festival in Victoria, Australia

Coordinates: 37.306°S 143.481°E

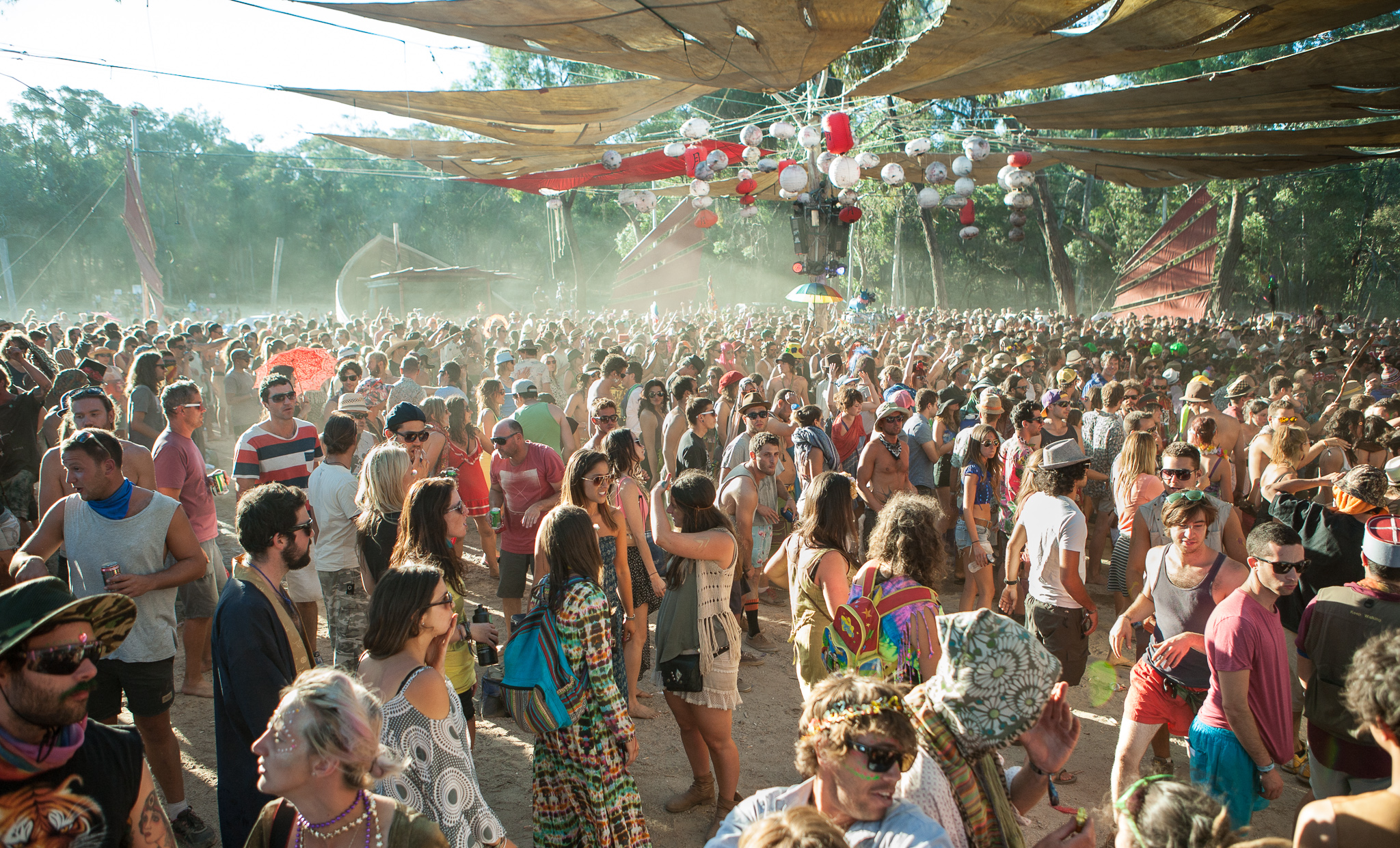
- The Market Stage at Rainbow Serpent 2013
- Genre: Electronic music, art and lifestyle
- Dates: Australia Day long weekend
- Location: Victoria, Australia
- Years active: 1997–2019, 2021–present
- Website: www.rainbowserpent.net

Rainbow Spirit Festival, previously known as Rainbow Serpent Festival, is a four-day annual open-air music and arts festival that takes place during the Australia Day (26 January) long weekend, in Lexton, Victoria, 160 kilometres (99 mi) west of Melbourne, Australia. The festival is mainly known for its focus on electronic music, with psychedelic trance, minimal techno, and chill-out music on its main stage, but it now features music across many genres, many art installations, workshops, and other attractions such as market stalls, healing arts and multi-cultural foods. Approximately 12,000 people attend the festival each year.

The music is presented over a number of separate stages and features both Australian and international musicians. Many people dress up in colourful costumes, often featuring glitter and beads. Some of the days have themes; in 2016, these themes included different colour parties and a "safari day".

== History ==
The name Rainbow Serpent comes from the Aboriginal Australian creation myth of the Rainbow Serpent. The first edition of the festival was in 1998.

The 2020 festival was cancelled due to site damage caused by bushfires in late December 2019.

The 2021 festival was presented as a streaming event due to the COVID-19 pandemic in Australia.

In July 2023, the festival changed its name to 'Rainbow Spirit Festival' due to concerns about cultural appropriation.

== Description ==
The festival extends over four days, on the long weekend which is always closest to Australia Day, on an open area of land near Lexton, in Victoria. It is mainly known for electronic music, with sub-genres psychedelic trance, minimal techno, and chill-out music, but it now features music across many genres, as well as art installations, workshops, and other attractions. There are market stalls, healing arts and multi-cultural foods.

The music is presented over a number of separate stages and features both Australian and international musicians. Approximately 12,000 people attend the festival each year.

== Stages ==
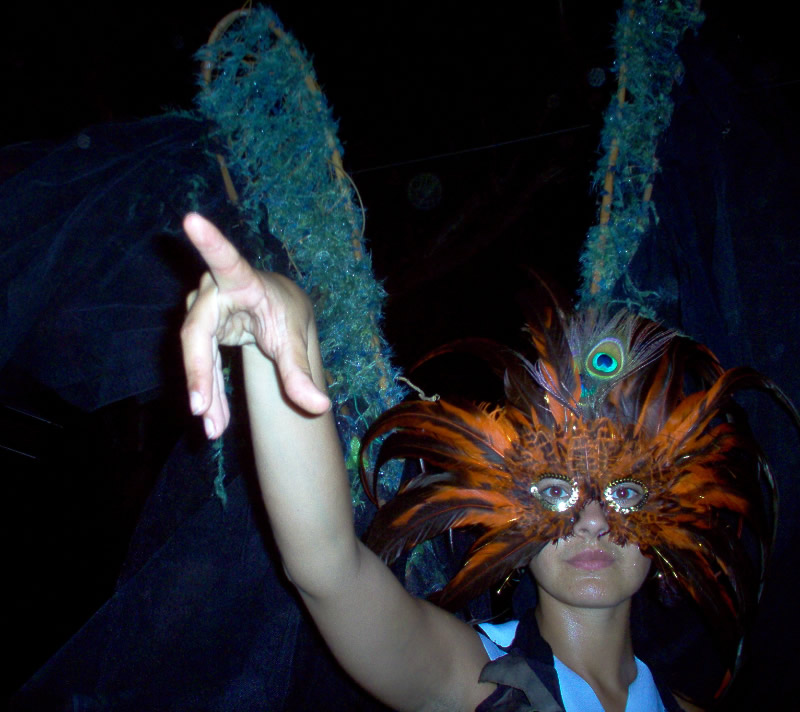
Performer at Rainbow Serpent Festival 2006

Five stages are listed on the 2020 Festival website: Main, Market, Sunset, The Playground, and Temple.

=== Main Stage ===
The Main Stage focuses on harder music such as Psytrance. Usually, the stage begins with an ambient act and progressively increases in energy throughout the night. The Main Stage runs for 20 hours, starting at 8:00 pm Saturday night, and finishes 4:00 pm Sunday afternoon.

=== Market Stage ===
The Market Stage plays a large variety of music ranging from ambient music, glitch hop, and tech house to psytrance. The Market Stage is the longest-running stage at the festival, starting on Friday night, and finishing early on Monday evening, it runs for about 72 hours continuously with no breaks except for one hour for the Main Stage opening ceremony. Many of the headliner acts actually play on the Market Stage, rather than on the Main Stage depending on their music style. The Monday afternoon on the Market Stage is widely regarded as one of the highlights of the festival, much like Saturday night on the Main Stage.

=== Sunset Stage ===
The Sunset Stage plays a variety of music throughout the festival, however, it closes for the 24-hour duration of the Main Stage opening. The Sunset Stage has more acts and genres than the Market Stage and the Main Stage provide.

=== Playground Stage ===
The Playground Stage, introduced to the festival in 2009, focuses on live performance music. The genres covered include dub, reggae, hip-hop, funk, folk, electro-swing, and jazz. It also showcases non-musical performers ranging from magicians to comedians, mimes, and fire twirlers.

== Notable acts ==
- 2010 – Robert Babicz, David Tipper
- 2011 – Shpongle. Alex Grey painted live on the Main Stage during Shpongle's performance.
- 2014 – The Orb
- 2015 – Pretty Lights
- 2017 – Hallucinogen
- 2019 – Patrick Topping
- 2020 – Larry, Jason and Vernon Guruwirri, sons of "Mr Didgeridoo" Djalu, perform in their new band Malawurr and share their skills and culture in a yiḏaki workshop.

== Problems ==
Festival organisers have been criticised for the number of drugs and sexual assaults at the event and, in 2016, the future of the festival was questioned. Fans have defended the festival in response to critical reports.

The festival has a social services space called "The Nest" to address instances of sexual assault and harassment. Victims are given access counselling and support services and medical resources.

In January 2019 the then Mayor of the Pyrenees Shire Council supported the push by Rainbow Serpent organisers for pill testing.

=== Incidents ===
In 2012, Daniel Buccianti, a 34-year-old man, died due to a combination of prescription medication and LSD. According to Victoria Police the death was not suspicious. That same year, a 25-year-old man suffered a cardiac arrest, also due to a drug overdose. He was hospitalised, but survived.

In 2014, a man was charged with 210 counts of "upskirting", and there were numerous other assaults and drug offences, along with ten people being hospitalised many for reasons related to drugs.

In 2015, a sexual assault was reported to have occurred at the festival, as well as 45 arrests for drug offences and an assault on police.

In 2017, a 22-year-old man died during the festival after drinking amyl nitrite. Police also reported two sexual assaults, and a number of assaults, including one assault on police, and drug offences.

== See also ==
- List of electronic music festivals
