= Minilogue =

Scandinavian techno music group

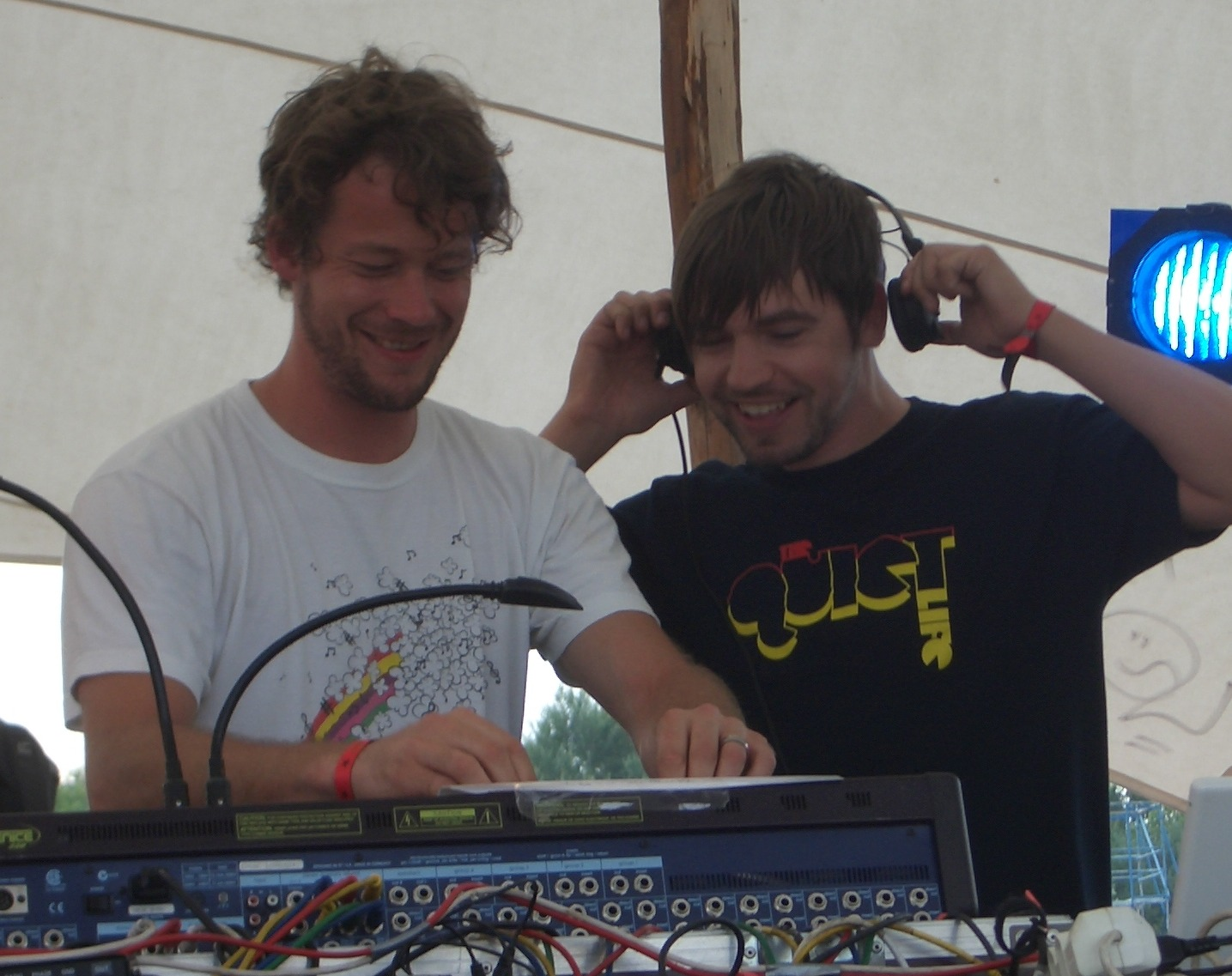

Background information
- Origin: Malmö, Sweden
- Genres: Minimal house/minimal techno
- Years active: 2000–2014
- Labels: Cocoon Recordings; Crosstown Rebels; Wagon Repair; WIR; Traum; Chillosophy
- Members: Marcus Henriksson; Sebastian Mullaert

Minilogue was a Scandinavian melodic techno music group consisting of Sebastian Mullaert and Marcus Henriksson. The name is a blend of minimal (the musical style) and dialogue, which refers to music as a form of communication.

Beside their music production as Minilogue, they were both involved in the group Son Kite,Trimatic and IMPS (with Ian Chaplin and Philip Rex). They were active from the year 2000 to 2014.

== History ==
Sebastian Mullaert and Marcus Henriksson came from opposing backgrounds.

Sebastian was trained as a classical musician playing the organ, piano and the violin among other instruments. He even became involved in teaching them until his coming of age at 18 when he formed a band and began experimenting with the sounds in a more contemporary way.

Marcus lived on a diet of Kraftwerk and the Human League until realising his true calling in the techno parties of the 1990s. Through promoting parties he moved on to become one of the bigger DJs in Southern Sweden. It was in a party where they met and decided to combine Sebastian’s musician’s perspective and knowledge with Marcus' DJ skills and experience from the scene.

They got together in 1996 and after 10 years in the music business under successful guises such as Son Kite and Trimatic, Marcus & Sebastian begun to be Minilogue.

They hail from Malmö, a city situated in south Sweden. Through the years their music has expanded and moved through a variety of sounds appealing across the board of electronic music.

Their later material touches on influences from a simplistic early 1990s sound of electronica, filled with warped and wondrous sounds creating textures with true depth and portraying a true sense of the duo’s vision.

Marcus & Sebastian decided to stop Minilogue in 2014 to focus on their own projects.

== Discography ==
Albums

- Animals (double album: 2xCD or 2xLP) – released on Cocoon in April 2008
- Blomma (double album: 2xCD or 2xLP+CD) – released on Cocoon in April 2013

EPs

- Fågel EP (12") – 2000
- Husdjur EP (12") – 2000
- Certain Things EP (12") – 2005
- Spam EP (12") – 2005
- Hitchhikers Choice EP (12") – 2006
- That's a Nice Way EP (12") – 2006
- The Leopard EP (12") – 2006
- Inca EP (12") – 2007
- Jakata EP (10") – 2010
- Cycles EP (12") – 2011

Singles'

- The Breeze (12") – 2001
- Deep Motions (12") – 2002
- In a Deeper Motion (12") – 2002
- Pixelized (12") – 2002
- Join the Minikab (12") – 2003
- Leloo (12") – 2003
- Little Sisters (12") – 2005
- Feedback (10") – 2006
- Leopard (12") – 2006
- The Girl from Botany Bay (12") – 2006
- Ahck Remixes (12") – 2007
- Elephant's Parade / Bird Song (12") – 2007
- Orglar (10") – 2007
- Out of the Curious (12") – 2007
- Seconds Rmx (12") – 2007
- The Leopard Rmx (12") – 2007
- Space (12") – 2007
- Jamaica (12") – 2008
- Intermediate State (12") – 2010
- Endlessness (12") – 2012
- The Island of If (12") – 2014

Remixes

- The Aircrash Bureau: Don't Expect Me (Minilogue Remix) – 2002
- Avatar: Drift Away (Minilogue Remix) – 2002
- Avatar: Drift Away [Part 2] (Minilogue Dub) – 2002
- Depeche Mode: In Chains (Minilogue's Earth Remix) – 2009
- Greed: I See You (Minilogue version) – 2003
- Leya: Lucky You (Minilogue Remix) – 2005
- Jaïa: Orchestra 2.0 (Minilogue Remix) – 2005
- Omnimotion: Japan (Minilogue Remix) – 2006
- Kritical Audio: Krupp (Minilogue Remix) – 2006
- Trentemoller & Buda: Gamma (Minilogue Remix) – 2007
- Jack Rock: Polyfemos (Minilogue Remix) – 2007
- Each: Sunrise (Minilogue Remix) – 2007
- Lulu Rouge: Bless You (Minilogue Remix) – 2008
- Beat Pharmacy: Rooftops (Minilogue Taqsim Mix) – 2009

Unofficial Release

- Massive Attack: Teardrop (Minilogue Remix) (12") – 2005
