= Psychedelic trance =

Genre of electronic music

- Stylistic origins: Trance; psychedelia; Goa trance; Eurodance; dream trance; hard trance; acid trance; techno; new beat; acid house; psychedelic rock; industrial; acid rock; classical music; Indian classical
- Cultural origins: Late 1990s, Goa (India) and Europe
- Derivative forms: Psybient

Subgenres
- Dark psytrance; forest psytrance; full-on; progressive psytrance; suomisaundi; zenonesque

Fusion genres
- Psybreaks; hard psy; psycore; psydub; psy tech trance

Psychedelic trance, psytrance, or psy is a subgenre of trance music characterized by arrangements of rhythms and layered melodies created by high tempo riffs. The genre offers variety in terms of mood, tempo, and style. Some examples include full on, darkpsy, forest, minimal (Zenonesque), hitech psy, progressive, night-time, suomi, psy-chill, psycore, psybient (fusion of psychedelic trance and ambient), psybreaks, or "adapted" tracks from other music genres. Goa trance preceded psytrance; when digital media became more commonly used, psytrance evolved. Goa continues to develop alongside the other genres.

== History ==
=== Origins ===
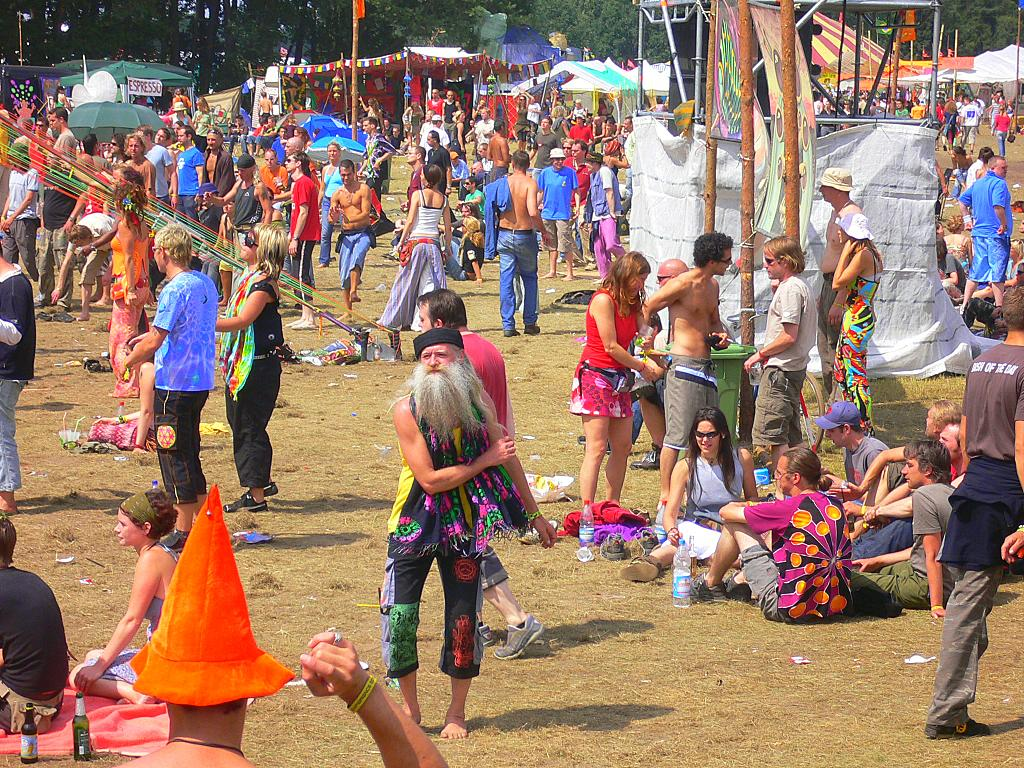
VooV Experience 2005 – one of the longest-existing psytrance open-air events

The first hippies who arrived in Goa, India (a former Portuguese colony) in the mid-1960s were drawn there for many reasons, including the beaches, the low cost of living, the friendly locals, the Indian religious and spiritual practices and the readily available Indian cannabis, which, until the mid-1970s, was legal. During the 1970s, the first Goa DJs were generally playing psychedelic rock bands such as the Grateful Dead, Pink Floyd and The Doors. In 1979, the beginnings of electronic dance music could occasionally be heard in Goa in the form of tracks by artists such as Kraftwerk, but it was not until 1983 that DJs Laurent and Fred Disko, closely followed by Goa Gil, began switching the Goa style over to electro-industrial/EBM which was now flooding out of Europe from artists such as Front 242 and Nitzer Ebb as well as Eurobeat.

The tracks were remixed, removing the lyrics, looping the melodies and beats and generally manipulating the sounds in all manner of ways before the tracks were finally presented to the dancers as custom Goa-style mixes.

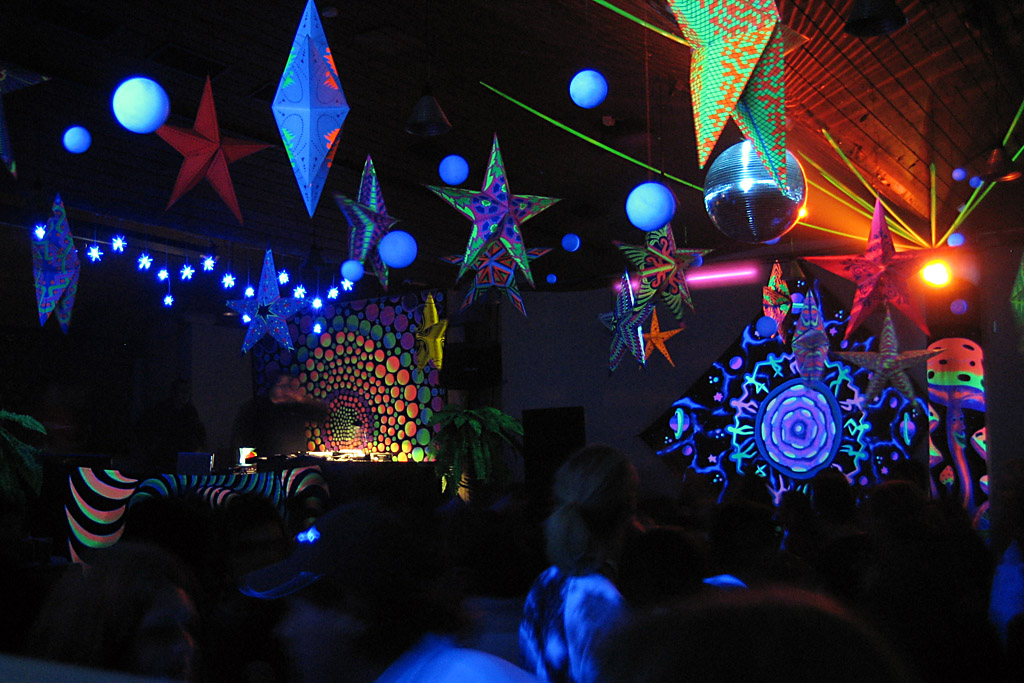
An indoor event

By 1990–91, Goa was beginning to attract attention and had become a popular destination for partying. As the scene grew bigger, Goa-style parties spread like a diaspora all over the world from 1993. Parties like Pangaea and Megatripolis in the UK helped spawn a multitude of labels in various countries (U.K., Australia, Japan, Germany and Israel) to promote psychedelic electronic music that reflected the ethos of Goa parties, Goa music, and Goa-specific artists, producers, and DJs. Goa trance as a commercial scene began gaining global traction in 1994. The golden age of the first wave of Goa psy trance as a generally agreed upon genre was between 1994 and 1997.

=== Development ===
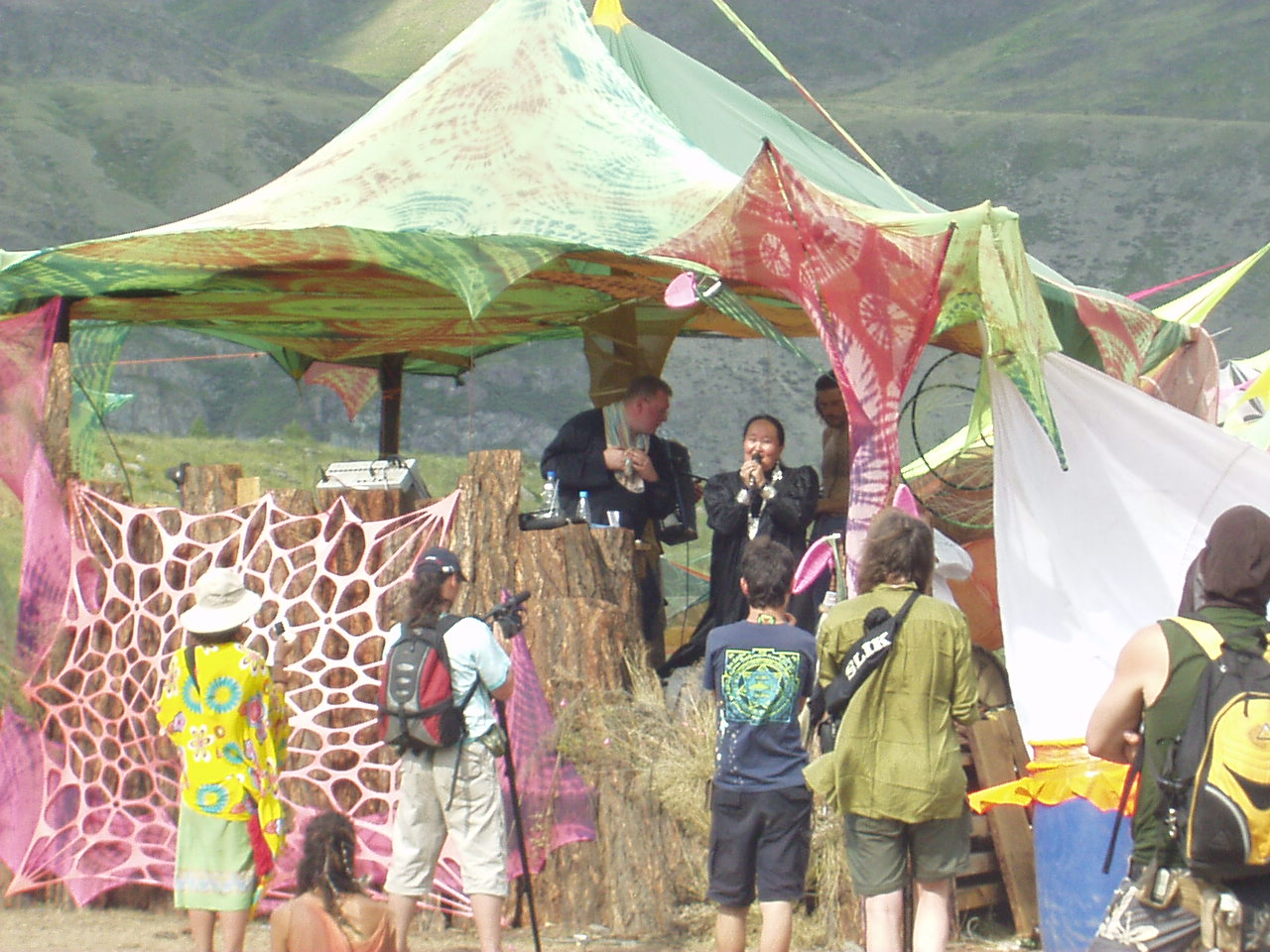
Performance at a Russian psytrance festival, 2008

By 1992, the Goa trance scene had established an independent dynamic, though the term "Goa trance" did not become the characterization of the genre until around 1994. The Goa trance sound, which, by the late 1990s, was being used interchangeably with the term psychedelic trance, retained its popularity at outdoor raves and festivals, but also permanent psytrance nightclubs emerged such as Natraj Temple in Munich. New artists were appearing from all over the world and it was in this year that the first Goa trance festivals began, including the Gaia Festival in France and the still-running VooV festival in Germany.

In 1993, the first Goa trance album was released, Project II Trance, featuring tracks by Man With No Name and Hallucinogen, to name two. Goa trance enjoyed its commercial peak between 1996 and 1997 with media attention and some recognized names in the DJ scene joining the movement. This hype did not last long and once the attention had died down, so did the music sales, resulting in the failure of record labels, promotion networks and also some artists. This "commercial death of Goa trance" was marked musically by Matsuri Productions in 1997 with the release of the compilation Let it RIP. On the back sleeve of the album at the bottom of the notes, “R.I.P : Mother Theresa, Princess Diana, William Burroughs & Goa Trance” was written.

While the psytrance genre began in the Goa trance scene, it went on to proliferate globally. Its impact was felt in western Europe, Middle East, North America, Australia, Japan and South Africa. Psytrance is linked to other music genres such as big beat, electroclash, grime and 2-step. The genre evolved in conjunction with the multimedia psychedelic arts scene.

== Characteristics ==
Inavon "3303" (2013)
An example of goa trance

Amiranu "The Rainbow God" (2013)
An example of full-on psytrance

Square Punch "Thundercat" (2011)
An example of prog-psytrance

Aghori TanTriK "Freaks of Byron Bay " (2005)
An example of dark psytrance

Psychedelic trance has a distinctive, energetic sound that tends to be faster than other forms of trance or techno music with tempos generally ranging from 125 to 150 BPM. It uses a very distinctive bass beat that pounds constantly throughout the song and overlays the bass with varying rhythms drawn from funk, techno, dance, acid house, eurodance and trance using drums and other instruments. The different leads, rhythms and beats generally change every eight bars. Layering is used to create effect in psychedelic trance, with new musical ideas being added at regular intervals, often every four to eight bars. New layers will continue to be added until a climax is reached, and then the song will break down and start a new rhythmic pattern over the constant bass line. Psychedelic trance tracks tend to be six to ten minutes long. This includes a developed and atmospheric introduction, and a breakdown in the middle of the track of around 30 seconds to over a minute.

== Subgenres ==
=== Dark psytrance ===
Dark psytrance (also known as dark psychedelic trance, dark psy, darkpsy or dark trance) is the heavier end of the psychedelic trance spectrum with tempos starting from around 150 bpm, but may often go faster. Characterized by having obscure, deep, and more eschatological background that leads into profound meditation of death, night, and transcendence, often with dismal sounds and heavy basslines. The subgenre often samples horror films in contrast to the science fiction film samples more regularly used in "normal" psytrance. Dark psytrance emerged as a recognizable genre after 2003 in Germany and Russia, with Brazilian, German and Russian artists dominating the scene. The German artist Xenomorph (Mark Petrick) is credited as an artist who first brought dark occult aesthetic into psytrance, with his album Cassandra's Nightmare released in 1998 being a major influence on the subgenre; X-Dream's Radio is another 1998 album cited as an early influence.

=== Full-on ===
Full-on is a psychedelic trance style which has high energy for peak moments, often having melodic, energetic, and crisp basslines with a fast tempo (usually 140–148 bpm). There are some related styles that are derived from this style and are distinguished as different varieties of Full-On: twilight and night full-on (or dark full-on), having bolder and lower notes in their basslines, morning (light and kind of happy), and uplifting. Artists working in the genre include Ajja, Burn in Noise, Dickster, Tristan and mitanef.

=== Suomisaundi ===
Suomisaundi (English: Finnish sound) is a variety originating in Finland during the mid-1990s.

== Derivations ==
=== Psybient ===
Psybient, also known as psychedelic ambient or ambient psy, is a genre of electronic music that contains elements of ambient, downtempo, psychedelic trance, dub, world music, new wave, ethereal wave, and IDM. The genre is also known for different alternative names used in different time periods. The earliest developments of the genre within ambient house and chill-out music scenes were known as psychill, psychedelic chillout, psy chillout, the later works within goa trance and psychedelic trance scenes are known as ambient psytrance or ambient goa. The dub derived developments are known as psydub and psystep.

Psybient pieces are structured to generate vast soundscapes or a "musical journey". Like psytrance, it emphasizes ongoing rhythm, but due to its ambient and atmospheric sections, it focuses less on beatmatching and allows for a myriad of tempo changes.

== Festivals ==
In general, large psytrance festivals are culturally and musically diverse.

Earthdance, the world's largest synchronized music and dance festival for peace, arose from the psychedelic trance culture.

At the 2004 Glastonbury Festival in the United Kingdom, psytrance was given an entire day on the Glade stage.

The Alien Safari, Vortex, and Synergy festivals are just a few of South Africa's many recurring and long-running psytrance festivals.

Rainbow Serpent Festival, Strawberry Fields, and Earthcore (now discontinued) are just a few of Australia's long-running psytrance festivals, dubbed "doofs".

The Boom Festival in Portugal began as a psytrance festival but has since expanded to include world music. It is held in summer every other year and combines social activism with cultural and spiritual elements.

The Ozora Festival in Hungary is an arts-focused event that emphasizes connecting with nature and oneself. Psytrance is still very popular at this festival.

== Cultural research ==
In 2007, research was conducted on the global psytrance scene. 600 people from 40 countries provided detailed information via an online questionnaire. The results were published as "Beyond Subculture and Post-subculture? The Case of Virtual Psytrance" in the Journal of Youth Studies.

In 2012, Graham St. John published Global Tribe: Technology, Spirituality and Psytrance.

== Controversies ==
In 2025, the psytrance scene became entangled in broader entertainment-industry boycott campaigns linked to Israel's war in Gaza. In Portugal, the Anta Gathering festival was cancelled after local authorities withdrew approval, after a pressure campaign by BDS Portugal alleging that "psychedelic culture" cannot accept "people who have committed war crimes and crimes against humanity" citing that one of the two organisers be an IDF reservist. In Australia, the Earth Frequency Festival dropped Israeli duo Infected Mushroom from its lineup following a grassroots pressure campaign, the Esoteric Festival rescinded the booking of Zionist artist DJ Antinomy. In Spain, Own Spirit Festival faced a backlash by activists and attendees denouncing that several artists playing there expressed support for the IDF during the war and that soldiers used the festival as a vacation from it, with the organisers allowing Israeli symbols and not Palestinian ones. On October 2025, Psytrance figures signed an open letter called "Psytrance in Solidarity", criticizing the silence of artists that did not take a stance on the Gaza genocide and the violations of human rights in Palestine.

== See also ==
- List of electronic music genres
- Hardcore

== Sources ==
- St John, Graham. (ed) 2010. The Local Scenes and Global Culture of Psytrance. London: Routledge. (ISBN 978-0415876964).
- St John, G. 2011. DJ Goa Gil: Kalifornian Exile, Dark Yogi and Dreaded Anomaly. Dancecult: Journal of Electronic Dance Music Culture 3(1): 97–128.
- St John, G. 2012. Seasoned Exodus: The Exile Mosaic of Psyculture. Dancecult: Journal of Electronic Dance Music Culture 4(1): 4–37.
- St John, G. 2012. Global Tribe: Technology, Spirituality and Psytrance, Equinox. ISBN 9781845539559.
