= Nothing Lasts... But Nothing Is Lost =

Nothing Lasts... But Nothing is Lost

Studio album by Shpongle
- Released: 16 June 2005
- Studio: Hallucinogen Sound Labs, Wiltshire
- Genre: Psybient
- Length: 67:30
- Label: Twisted Records (United Kingdom)
- Producer: Simon Posford, Raja Ram

Shpongle chronology
Tales of the Inexpressible (2001)	Nothing Lasts... But Nothing is Lost (2005)	Ineffable Mysteries from Shpongleland (2009)

Professional ratings
Review scores
Source	Rating
Ethnotechno	5/5 stars

Nothing Lasts... But Nothing is Lost is a 2005 album by Shpongle. It is the project's third and was announced as their last, though that plan later changed. Like the previous two albums, it features many live musicians and vocalists in combination with computer-generated sounds and spoken-word samples. Stylistically the album can be described as a fusion of world music, intelligent dance music, and psychedelic trance. It is dedicated in memory of author and psychedelic researcher Terence McKenna, whose voice and ideas are used throughout the album. The tracks flow together continuously without any break.

According to Simon Posford, the album actually has 8 songs divided into 20 tracks. Each part symbolizes a phase in the dream sequence. The vinyl version of the album is separated into these 8 tracks, but the track listing is identical to that of the digital and CD versions.

== Track listing ==
No.	Title	Length
1.	"Botanical Dimensions"	4:37
2.	"Outer Shpongolia"	2:33
3.	"Levitation Nation"	3:40
4.	"Periscopes of Consciousness"	1:54
5.	"Schmaltz Herring"	2:21
6.	"Nothing Lasts..."	4:28
7.	"Shnitzled in the Negev"	4:18
8.	"...But Nothing Is Lost"	4:39
9.	"When Shall I Be Free?"	4:37
10.	"The Stamen of the Shamen"	4:11
11.	"Circuits of the Imagination"	3:12
12.	"Linguistic Mystic"	1:36
13.	"Mentalism"	2:54
14.	"Invocation"	2:40
15.	"Molecular Superstructure"	4:47
16.	"Turn Up the Silence"	3:22
17.	"Exhalation"	2:16
18.	"Connoisseur of Hallucinations"	3:31
19.	"The Nebbish Route"	3:36
20.	"Falling Awake"	1:50
Total length:		67:30

All tracks written by Simon Posford and Raja Ram, except track 19 (S. Posford, R. Ram, P. Callard) and track 20 (P. Callard).

== Credits ==
=== In The Studio ===
- Simon Posford: drums (tracks 1, 2, 7, 8, 18, 19), bass guitar (tracks 4, 9), electric guitar (tracks 9, 10, 18, 19), synthesizer, keyboards, drum programming, production
- Raja Ram: flute (tracks 7, 13, 15, 17, 19), vocals (tracks 2, 7, 8, 11–13, 19)
- Pete Callard: acoustic guitar (tracks 1–3, 18–20), electric guitar (tracks 18, 19)
- Hari-Om: vocals (tracks 9, 10, 14, 15)
- Chris Barker: bass (tracks 3, 7, 16)
- Ott: timbales (tracks 3, 5)
- Kevin Metcalfe: mastering at Soundmasters

=== Shpongle Live ===
- Pete Callard: guitars
- Hari-Om: vocals
- Michele Adamson: vocals
- Nogira: drums, percussion
- Harry Escott: cello
- Raja Ram: flute, vocal effects
- Simon Posford: computers, bass, mixing
- Ott: engineering

== Samples and allusions ==
- Botanical Dimensions samples from the Richard Linklater film Waking Life.
- Levitation Nation samples a 2003 song by the Brazilian samba school Beija-Flor de Nilópolis.
- The title for Nothing Lasts comes from Ovid's Metamorphoses, a translation of "Omnia mutantur, sed nihil interit"
- Circuits of the Imagination contains a sample of the "bionic" sound effect from The Six Million Dollar Man.
- The Nebbish Route song samples Ned Flanders from The Simpsons episode El Viaje Misterioso de Nuestro Jomer (The Mysterious Voyage of Homer).
