= The Last Days of Gravity =

The Last Days Of Gravity

Studio album by Younger Brother
- Released: 15 October 2007
- Genre: Electronica, Psybient
- Length: 67:38
- Label: Twisted
- Producer: Simon Posford, Benji Vaughan

Younger Brother chronology
A Flock of Bleeps (2003)	The Last Days Of Gravity (2007)	Vaccine (2011)

Professional ratings
Review scores
Source	Rating
Popmatters	9/10 stars

The Last Days of Gravity is Younger Brother's second album. It is a collaborative downtempo psychedelic project between English psytrance Producers Simon Posford (Hallucinogen, Shpongle) and Benji Vaughan (Prometheus, Cyberbabas).

The album was positively received by critics.

== Track listing ==
1. "Happy Pills" - 8:49
2. "All I Want" - 9:06
3. "Elephant Machine" - 6:22
4. "Your Friends Are Scary" - 6:41
5. "I Am a Freak" - 9:00
6. "Ribbon on a Branch" - 7:49
7. "Sleepwalker, Part 1" - 6:18
8. "Sleepwalker, Part 2" - 6:02
9. "Psychic Gibbon" - 7:31

== Trivia ==
- The cover art of The Last Days Of Gravity is done by Storm Thorgerson.
- The spoken intro in "All I Want" is taken from an interview with Salvador Dalí.
- The female singing at 4:44 in "All I Want" is taken from the song "Viimesen Kerran / The Very Last Time" by the Finnish quartet Loituma.
