= The God Particle (EP) =

EP by Shpongle
- Released: 1 February 2011
- Genre: Psybient, chill-out
- Length: 17:06
- Label: Twisted Records
- Producer: Simon Posford, Raja Ram, and Benji Vaughan

The God Particle is the third EP by Shpongle, released on 1 February 2011. Both tracks on the EP feature Benji Vaughan of Younger Brother. The EP was inspired by the Large Hadron Collider in Switzerland.

== Track listing ==
1. "Before The Big Bang" – 6:23
2. "The God Particle" – 10:43

The title of the first track was misspelled as "Berfore The Big Bang" on the CD version.
