= Ott (record producer) =

British record producer

- Also known as: Hikikomori, Umberloid
- Born: 1968 (age 57–58)
- Origin: London, England
- Genres: Electronic, dub, ambient, psybient, psydub, trip hop, ethnic electronica, livetronica
- Years active: 2002–present
- Labels: Twisted Records (UK), Ottsonic
- Website: ottsonic.net

Otteran Langrell (born 1968), known as Ott, is a British record producer and musician who has worked with Sinéad O'Connor, Embrace, the Orb, and Brian Eno, and has achieved recognition since 2002 for his own psychedelic dub tracks and his collaborations with Simon Posford (Hallucinogen / Shpongle). He has released two albums on Twisted Records: Blumenkraft (2003), Skylon (2008), and four albums on Ottsonic: Mir (2011), Fairchildren (2015), Heads (2022) and Hiraeth (2024).

== Career ==
Since the early 2000s, Ott has produced, mixed and recorded music released on Twisted Records, including various collaborations with founder Simon Posford. His first major contribution to Twisted was the record Hallucinogen – In Dub, on which he remixed six classic Hallucinogen songs. In May 2003 he released his own album, Blumenkraft, on Twisted; it was reviewed by The Wire. His work has also been featured in releases from the record label Liquid Sound Design (now known as Liquid Sound, run by Martin Glover), especially those compilations produced by Humphrey Bacchus during his time at the label. He followed up his debut album in January 2008 with Skylon, followed by Mir in March 2011.

Ott performed at the Glastonbury Festival in 2007. His performance at Glade Festival in 2011 was described as "the perfect opening act" in an article at Virtual Festivals. That publication also called Ott a "psy-dub maestro" and gave his performance a full 10/10.

He has also contributed to several other records on Twisted as well as other labels.

== Discography ==
=== Studio albums ===
- Blumenkraft (2003)
- Skylon (2008)
- Mir (2011)
- Baby Robot EP (2013)
- Fairchildren (2015)
- Heads (2022)
- Hiraeth (2024)

=== As engineer ===
- Are You Shpongled? (Compiled and edited by Ott)
- Eclipse – A Journey of Permanence & Impermanence (Compiled and edited by Ott and Simon Posford)
- Hallucinogen – In Dub (Produced, programmed and mixed by Ott)
- Nothing Lasts...But Nothing Is Lost (Engineered by Ott. He also plays timbales on tracks 3 and 5)
- Hallucinogen in Dub Live

=== Other ===
- Scilly Automatic (from Talisman, Interchill Records CD015, 2002)
- Ott Meets Billy The Kid (from Elucidations by Liquid Sound Design, 2002)
- Evil Do'ers by Gargoyles [Ott and Simon Posford] (from Talisman, Interchill Records] CD015, 2002)
- Joyful Wonder (from Backroom Beats 2, Twisted Records 2003)
- Spacebaby (Seiberg & Witten Mix) by Gargoyles (from Backroom Beats 2, Twisted Records 2003)
- Neon Tetra by Umberloid (written and produced by Ott and Chris Barker; from 13th Moon, Interchill Records CD016, 2003)
- Shpongle – The Remixes (Remix of Around The World in a Tea Daze, 2003)
- Tripswitch – Silver (Ott Remix) (from Wider Horizons, by Liquid Sound Design, 2004)
- Exit Chapel Perilous by Umberloid (written and produced by Ott and Chris Barker, from Soul vibration Vol. 1 by Liquid Records, 2005)
- Entheogenic – Dialogue of the Speakers (Remixes of Timeless E.S.P. and Ground Luminosity, 2005)
- Eye of the Beholder (written and produced by Ott and Colin Bennun; from Free Range by O.O.O.D., Organic Records ORGCD0012, 2006)
- Bluetech – Prayer For Rain (Ott Remix) (from Natural Born Chillers 2, Aleph Zero Records 2009)
- Sound Tribe Sector 9 – The Spectacle (Ott Remix) (from STS9 – Peaceblaster: The New Orleans Make It Right Remixes, 2009)
- The Disco Biscuits – Konkrete (Ott Remix) (from The Disco Biscuits – Widgets EP, 2009)
- Terra Nine – No Return (Ott Remix) (from Terra Nine – Stream Of Consciousness, 2009)
- Hoopy Frood – Indigo (Produced by Ott, 2009)
