= Ineffable Mysteries from Shpongleland =

Studio album by Shpongle
- Released: 2 November 2009
- Recorded: 2007–2009
- Genre: Psybient, chill-out
- Length: 70:26
- Label: Twisted Records (United Kingdom)
- Producer: Simon Posford and Raja Ram

Shpongle chronology
| Nothing Lasts... But Nothing Is Lost (2005) | Ineffable Mysteries from Shpongleland (2009) | Museum of Consciousness (2013) |

Professional ratings
Review scores
| Source | Rating |
|---|---|
| Sputnikmusic | 4.5/5 stars |

Ineffable Mysteries from Shpongleland is the fourth studio album by Shpongle released on 2 November 2009. The album's track list was released on 12 August via Twisted Records (UK)'s website. Songs from the album began to trickle to the public in live form, being played at many of Shpongle's 2009 concerts. Previews of the album were made available through Twisted Music's official audio player. The album was ranked at #7 on Sputnik's Best Of 2009 list.

Stylistically, the album is the culmination of what began with their previous album Nothing Lasts... But Nothing Is Lost, in the sense that it contains much more emphasis on world music influences and parts performed on various instruments by Posford, Ram and guest musicians, compared to first two albums which were heavier on sampling and with more influences from dub and electronic dance music. As one of more interesting bits of instrumental work, the track "Nothing is Something Worth Doing" is built around novel melodic percussive instrument Hang, and lines played by Austrian Hang player Manu Delago.

The cover artwork was created by Storm Thorgerson.

== Track listing ==
1. "Electroplasm" – 10:12
2. "Shpongolese Spoken Here" – 6:38
3. "Nothing Is Something Worth Doing" – 6:24
4. "Ineffable Mysteries" – 10:26
5. "I Am You" – 11:36
6. "Invisible Man in a Fluorescent Suit" – 8:54
7. "No Turn Un-Stoned" – 8:02
8. "Walking Backwards Through the Cosmic Mirror" – 8:13

Total: 70:26

== Personnel ==
- Raja Ram – Flute, alto flute, vocals, producer
- Simon Posford – Programming, electric guitar, acoustic guitar, bass, sitar, synth, drums, vocals, producer
- Michele Adamson – Vocals
- Hari Om – Vocals
- Henry Escott – Cello
- Pete Callard – Acoustic guitar
- Manu Delago – Hang
- Andy Gangadeen – Drums
- Kevin Metcalfe – Mastering
- Stormstudios – Graphic design
