= A Flock of Bleeps =

Studio album by Younger Brother
- Released: May 12, 2003
- Genre: Psybient
- Length: 65:01
- Label: Twisted
- Producer: Simon Posford, Benji Vaughan

Younger Brother chronology
A Flock of Bleeps (2003)	The Last Days of Gravity (2007)

A Flock of Bleeps is the debut studio album by the music group Younger Brother. It is a collaborative psybient/psychill project between English psytrance producers Simon Posford (Hallucinogen, Shpongle) and Benji Vaughan (Prometheus).

== Track listing ==
Source: Psyshop.com

No.	Title	Length
1.	"Weird on a Monday Night" (This song contains vocal samples from Alice in Wonderland)	9:37
2.	"The Receptive"	5:58
3.	"Evil and Harm"	6:04
4.	"Crumblenaut"	6:31
5.	"Scanner"	8:24
6.	"Even Dwarves Start Small" (This song contains vocal samples from Message to Love)	6:48
7.	"Magic Monkey Juice" (This song samples the "Drugs" episode of Brass Eye)	7:00
8.	"Finger"	8:11
9.	"Safety Zone"	3:35
10.	"Bedtime Story" (This song samples the main theme of the film Withnail & I)	2:49
