= Tales of the Inexpressible =

Studio album by Shpongle
- Released: 1 July 2001
- Studio: Hallucinogen Sound Labs
- Genre: World music, psybient
- Length: 69:00
- Label: Twisted Records (UK); Kinetic/BMG Records (US)
- Producer: Simon Posford, Raja Ram

Shpongle chronology
Are You Shpongled? (1999)	Tales of the Inexpressible (2001)	Nothing Lasts...But Nothing Is Lost (2005)

Tales of the Inexpressible is Shpongle's second album, released in 2001. Simon Posford and Raja Ram hone and expand the style introduced on their debut album, Are You Shpongled?. Raja Ram plays Spanish and East Asian instruments along with the flute, and Simon Posford plays classical guitar as well as synthesizing and sampling.

The song "Room 23" appears on the back cover of the album with the name "Room 2ॐ", the character "ॐ" being the Om, the sacred eternal sound in Hinduism. A remastered, super-deluxe edition of Tales of the Inexpressible was released on 26 February 2018.

== Track listing ==
No.	Title	Length
1.	"Dorset Perception"	8:12
2.	"Star Shpongled Banner"	8:23
3.	"A New Way To Say 'Hooray!'"	8:32
4.	"Room 2ॐ"	5:05
5.	"My Head Feels Like a Frisbee"	8:53
6.	"Shpongleyes"	8:56
7.	"Once Upon the Sea of Blissful Awareness"	7:31
8.	"Around the World in a Tea Daze"	11:22
9.	"Flute Fruit"	2:09
Total length:		69:00

== Credits ==
- Raja Ram: flute, vocals, illustrations, production
- Simon Posford: programming, guitar, synthesizers, semi-acoustic bass, production
- Michele Adamson: vocals, backing vocals
- Abigail Gorton: vocals
- Harry Escot: cello, acoustic bass
- Pete Callard: acoustic guitar
- Kevin Metcalfe: remastering at The Soundmasters

== Samples and allusions ==
- The name of the song Dorset Perception alludes to Aldous Huxley's book The Doors of Perception. Dorset is the location of Posford's studio, the Hallucinogen Sound Labs.
- The Shpongle song A New Way to Say 'Hooray!' contains a sample of a lecture by Terence McKenna, in which he references the Pink Floyd song The Gnome (from the 1967 The Piper at the Gates of Dawn album). The gnomes are actually creatures which Terence describes meeting over and over on many of his DMT related trance experiences.
- A New Way to Say 'Hooray!' contains vocal and choir samples from the sample CD "Heart of Africa Volume 2" by Spectrasonics.
- The sample: "This is, er, no offense but you are a robot, aren't you?" used in Shpongleyes is taken from the classic science fiction movie Forbidden Planet.
- The dinosaur sounds sample sounds heard in Shpongleyes are taken from the film Jurassic Park: The Lost World.
- The male vocals on Around the World in a Tea Daze after 6:45 are a sample from a famous Turkish song titled "Dönülmez Akşamın Ufkundayız" by Turkish Pop singer Tarkan (singer). The lyrics are originally from a poem by Yahya Kemal Beyatlı. The sample is taken from the sample CD "Voices Of Istanbul" by Q Up Arts.
- My Head Feels Like a Frisbee contains merengue horns samples from the sample CD "Festa Latina" by Best Service.
- Towards the end of the track My Head Feels Like a Frisbee, a sample of Ella Fitzgerald singing How High the Moon can be heard. The sample is sped up.
- The end of Star Shpongled Banner uses a vocal part of the song "Dança do Vampiro" (Vampire's Dance), by the Brazilian axé music group Asa de Águia.
