= In Dub =

In Dub may refer to:

- In Dub (Hallucinogen album), 2002
- ...In Dub, a 2004 album by Meat Beat Manifesto
- In Dub – Live, a 2009 album by Hallucinogen
