= Psydub =

Music genre

- Stylistic origins: Psychedelic trance; psybient; ambient; ambient house; dub; trip hop; psychedelia
- Cultural origins: Early 1990s, London, United Kingdom
- Typical instruments: Drums; tabla; drum machine; sequencer; acoustic guitar; sampler; electric guitar; sitar; bass guitar; synthesizer; keyboard

Psydub (not to be confused with dub) is a fusion genre of electronic music that has roots in psychedelic trance, ambient and dub music. Incorporated dub elements are melodic basslines, deep reggae roots and producing techniques like dynamically adding extensive echo, reverb, panoramic delay, and occasional dubbing of vocal or instrumental snippets from the original version or other works. An incorporated ambient element is an emphasis on tone and atmosphere.

Incorporated psytrance and Goa trance elements are low-bass frequencies and hypnotic melodies and the use of vocal samples, often from science fiction movies. Those samples mostly contain references to psychedelic drugs, cannabis, parapsychology, extraterrestrial life, existentialism, out of body experiences, dreams, physics, molecular biology, electronics, time travel and spirituality.

Psydub is also highly influenced by the music of India.

== History ==
The pioneers of the genre were mostly interested in the combination between ambient music and dub. The Orb can be seen as one of the first producers to combine the two genres. Several tracks on their first album "The Orb's Adventures Beyond the Ultraworld", released in 1991, already sound a lot like contemporary Psydub. Psydub developed further by the influence of Psytrance. Psytrance producers have always had a keen interest in all kinds of music and a few of them have produced tracks that have big Dub influences. Most notably is the song "Vapour Rumours", released in 1996 and produced by the band Shpongle, consisting of Simon Posford a.k.a. Hallucinogen and Raja Ram and the album "Earthbound" by Gaudi, produced in 1994 and released on triple vinyl in 1998 by Bustin' Loose Recordings, who were two of the first acts to produce psybient music. A good example of the combination between psytrance and dub is the album In Dub, a collection of Hallucinogen tracks remixed by the record producer Ott, which was released in October 2002.
