= List of drama films =

List of drama films is a chronological listing of films in the drama genre.

- List of drama films of the 1900s
- List of drama films of the 1910s
- List of drama films of the 1920s
- List of drama films of the 1930s
- List of drama films of the 1940s
- List of drama films of the 1950s
- List of drama films of the 1960s
- List of drama films of the 1970s
- List of drama films of the 1980s
- List of drama films of the 1990s
- List of drama films of the 2000s
- List of drama films of the 2010s
- List of drama films of the 2020s
