= Are You Shpongled? =

Studio album by Shpongle
- Released: January 1998
- Studio: The Hallucinogen Sound Labs in Dorset, UK
- Genre: World, psybient
- Length: 77:58
- Label: Twisted (United Kingdom); Kinetic/BMG (United States)
- Producer: Shpongle

Shpongle chronology
Are You Shpongled? (1998)	Tales of the Inexpressible (2001)

Are You Shpongled? is the first of seven albums released by Shpongle. Are You Shpongled? sold in excess of 30,000 copies. A remastered version of Are You Shpongled? was released on 30 June 2017, along with a limited edition super-deluxe triple vinyl set.

== Track listing ==
No.	Title	Length
1.	"Shpongle Falls"	8:33
2.	"Monster Hit"	8:57
3.	"Vapour Rumours"	10:26
4.	"Shpongle Spores"	7:16
5.	"Behind Closed Eyelids"	12:29
6.	"Divine Moments of Truth"	10:20
7.	"...And the Day Turned to Night"	19:57
Total length:		77:58

== Credits ==
- Raja Ram: silver flute in C, vocals, illustrations
- Simon Posford: synthesizer, guitars, drums, bass, engineering, mixing, programming
- Dave Bernez: mastering at Townhouse Studios
- Mark Neal: sleeve
- Sat Ram Bradley: mask sculpture
- Warwick Saint: photography

== Allusions ==
- The song "Divine Moments of Truth" is a tribute to the psychoactive drug Dimethyltryptamine (DMT).
- "Monster Hit" contains a female vocal sample from sample CD "Deepest India" by Zero-G.
- The throat singing in the beginning of "Divine Moments of Truth" is taken from a sample CD called Vocal Planet by Spectrasonics.
- The track "Vapour Rumours" contains a sample from the 1990s The Outer Limits series' Second Soul episode.
- "Behind Closed Eyelids" features a section of speech from an interview with Aldous Huxley from which the title is derived.

== In popular culture ==
- "Divine Moments of Truth" is also popular for being used in the widespread flash animation "Flashback".
- "...And The Day Turned To Night" would later be remixed by Eat Static on Shpongle's remix album. It is listed as "...And the Day Turned To Fright"
