= Quintessence (band) =

English rock band

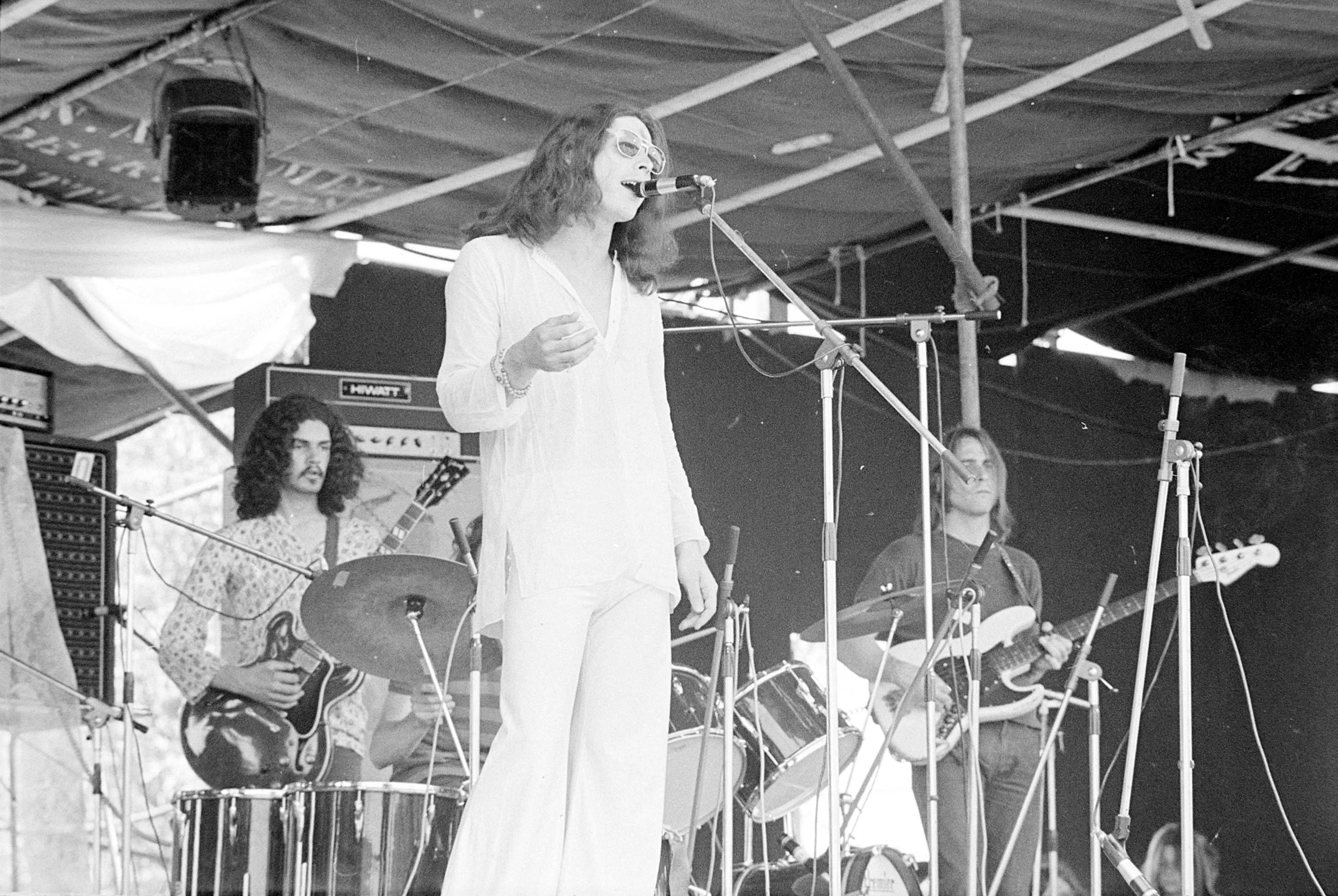
- Quintessence (Kralingen, 1970)

Background information
- Origin: Notting Hill, London, United Kingdom
- Genre: Progressive rock
- Years active: 1969–1980
- Spinoffs: Shpongle, Blurt
- Past members: Sambhu Babaji; Jake Milton; Allan Mostert; Raja Ram; Maha Dev; Shiva Shankar Jones

Quintessence were a rock band formed in April 1969 in Notting Hill, London, England. Their style of progressive rock included elements of rock, jazz and music from India.

== Career ==
The original line-up included Sambhu Babaji (bass guitar), Maha Dev (rhythm guitar), Shiva Shankar Jones (vocals, keyboards, percussion), Jake Milton (drums, percussion), Allan Mostert (lead guitar) (born 1952), and Raja Ram (flute, percussion). Jones, an Australian, had been Phil Jones and with his Sydney band the Unknown Blues had a hit with "If I Had a Ticket" in 1967.

They rehearsed in All Saints Hall which was a converted church near Portobello Road, and recorded three albums for Island Records between 1969 and 1971, with two further albums recorded in 1972 for RCA. The first of the latter set, Self, featured studio material on side one, with the band recorded playing live at Exeter University, on 11 December 1971, on side two.

They built a reputation on solid club work. Besides appearing at the first two Glastonbury Festivals (then called 'Fayres'), in 1970/71, they also were invited to play the Montreux Jazz Festival.

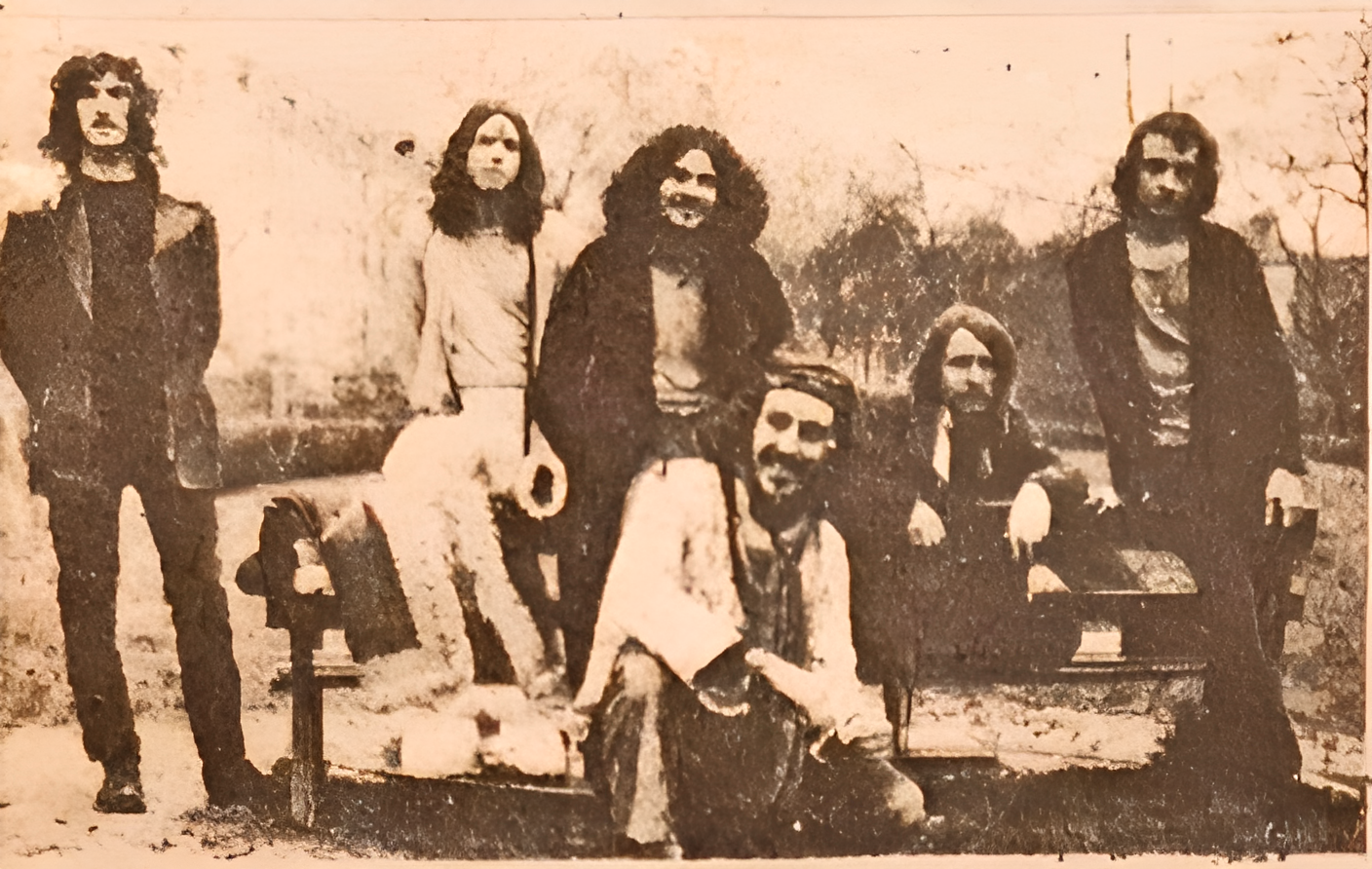
Photo published in 1972

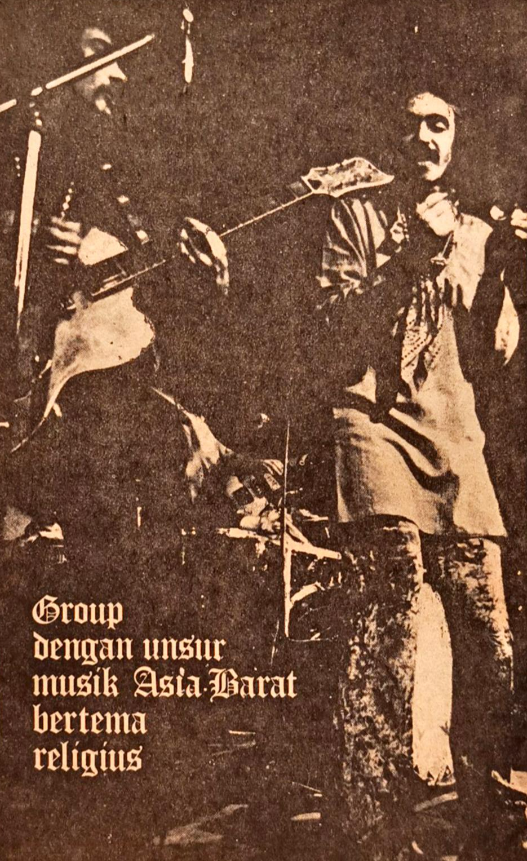
Photo publ. the same year

On 18 September 1971, Quintessence played a benefit concert for Bangladesh at The Oval, Kennington. They appeared on a bill that included The Who, Mott the Hoople, Lindisfarne, Atomic Rooster, The Grease Band and America.

Although Quintessence played many hundreds of concerts and festivals all over Europe, they turned down a U.S. record deal negotiated by Island Records' Chris Blackwell and did not play at a concert at New York's Carnegie Hall lined up in early 1972, or tour the U.S., because four of the band's members wanted a larger monetary advance. This disappointed Blackwell and he dropped the band from the record label. Quintessence then signed with RCA and recorded one album with Jones and Dev. Raja Ram then unexpectedly 'fired' the pair after that album was released. Jones and Dev went on to form the short-lived outfit called Kala. Meanwhile, Quintessence played on into the 1980s before breaking up.

== Later activities ==
Jones, the primary composer of Quintessence, has been extensively touring throughout the United States for the last 20 years. Jones has released numerous recordings of both new material and updated versions of Quintessence songs with his Swiss musical partner, Ralph Rudra Beauvert, via their band Shiva's Quintessence. As of 2014, Jones is performing in the U.S. with Boston-based guitarist Frank M Evans, as Trans-Portal, expressing many of the Quintessence songs in a more intimate and acoustic format.

In 2010, Maha Dev's new Quintessence were invited by Michael Eavis to play the 40th Anniversary Glastonbury Festival, where they were joined by original vocalist Jones. Produced by John Barham, Quintessence's previous producer, this performance was recorded and released as Rebirth: Live At Glastonbury in 2011. The reunion of Phil Shiva Jones with Dev's Quintessence for the 2010 Glastonbury Festival was documented in a BBC One Inside Out programme which was aired in November 2010.

Maha Dev's Quintessence continued to perform sporadically in the UK recreating the 'classic' Island Records era Quintessence sound. Dev released his first solo album, and Jones' Quintessence continues to record sporadically. Jake Milton went on to form Blurt with his brother Ted Milton. Raja Ram went on to help create the psytrance style of electronic music in the 1990s, and continues to produce electronic music to this day, being most well known for his involvement in Shpongle.

Maha Dev (born David Codling) died on 5 July 2019 from cancer.

== Personnel ==
- Sambhu Babaji (Richard Vaughan) - bass guitar (1969-1980)
- Jake Milton - drums, percussion (1969-1980)
- Allan Mostert (Alan Mostert) - lead guitar (1969-1980)
- Raja Ram (Ronald Rothfield) - flute, percussion (1969-1980)
- Maha Dev (David Codling) - rhythm guitar (1969-1972, 2010; died 2019)
- Phil Shiva Jones (Phil Jones) - vocals, keyboards, percussion (1969-1972, 2010)

== Discography ==
Studio albums

- In Blissful Company (Island Records, 1969)
- Quintessence (Island Records, 1970) - UK No. 22
- Dive Deep (Island Records, 1971) - UK No. 43
- Self (RCA, 1972) - UK No. 50
- Indweller (RCA, 1972)

Live albums

- Infinite Love, Live At Queen Elizabeth Hall 1971 (Hux, 2009)
- Cosmic Energy, Live At St Pancras 1970 (Hux, 2009)
- Rebirth Live At Glastonbury 2010 (Hux, 2011)

== See also ==
- Island Records discography
- List of former Island Records artists
- List of film score composers
