= Corridor of Mirrors =

Studio album by Prometheus
- Released: 4 January 2007
- Genre: Psychedelic trance
- Label: Twisted Records
- Producer: Benji Vaughan

Prometheus chronology
Robot.O.Chan (2004)	Corridor of Mirrors (2007)	Spike (2010)

Corridor of Mirrors is Prometheus's (Benji Vaughan) second album.

== Track listing ==
1. Arcadia Magik (8:51)
2. One Cell Short of a Brain (6:50)
3. Drug Sock (7:37)
4. The Logic of the Polyphonic (8:19)
5. 9th (The Man Who Swam Through a Speaker) (8:08)
6. Soma (7:38)
7. Oz (7:35)
8. Cherry Pie (8:46)
