= John Barham =

British musician

John Barham is an English classical pianist, composer, arranger, producer and educator. He is best known for his orchestration of George Harrison albums such as All Things Must Pass (1970) and for his association with Indian sitar maestro Ravi Shankar.

Barham trained at the Royal College of Music and the School of Oriental and African Studies in London, before establishing himself during the mid 1960s as a composer of piano interpretations of Indian classical ragas. He became a student of Shankar, for whose East–West collaborations with Yehudi Menuhin and others he transcribed Indian melodies into Western musical annotation. Through Shankar, Barham began a long friendship with Harrison in 1966, then a member of the Beatles, which assisted Harrison's own education in Indian music as well as his promotion of the genre to Western audiences. Barham collaborated with Harrison on the latter's Wonderwall Music soundtrack album (1968), before providing the orchestral arrangements for All Things Must Pass songs such as "Isn't It a Pity" and "My Sweet Lord", and for Harrison's 1973 album Living in the Material World.

Most often in the role of orchestral or choral arranger, Barham also contributed to albums such as the Beatles' Let It Be, John Lennon's Imagine and Gary Wright's Footprint in the early 1970s. His projects as a music producer during the same period included three albums by progressive rock band Quintessence, and he has worked on film or TV soundtracks for directors Otto Preminger, Alejandro Jodorowsky and Jonathan Miller. Other artists with whom Barham has worked include Elton John, André Previn, Phil Spector, Roger Daltrey, Yoko Ono and Jackie Lomax.

Continuing his interest in Indian music, Barham released an album with ya Aashish Khan in 1973, Jugalbandi, and contributed to Shankar's final collaboration with Harrison, Chants of India, in 1996. Among his educational positions, he has taught at Trinity College of Music, London.

== Early recognition and work with Ravi Shankar ==
Born in London in the 1940s, John Barham studied piano, trumpet and music composition at the Royal College of Music. He then attended London University's School of Oriental and African Studies (SOAS), where he developed an interest in Indian classical music. Among English classical musicians of the mid 1960s, Barham's piano compositions based on Indian ragas were unprecedented and brought him to the attention of members of India's cultural community in London. Some of his works were first performed and recorded for radio broadcast by British pianist John Bingham (Reflections and Piano Concerto).

Barham became a student of Indian sitarist and composer Ravi Shankar, whose international popularity by 1966 had grown to include Western rock audiences. In June that year, Barham attended the Bath Music Festival in the west of England, where Shankar and American violinist Yehudi Menuhin were due to perform an historic duet. At Shankar's request, Barham transcribed the sitarist's adaptation of Raga Tilang into Western musical annotation for Menuhin's benefit, after Shankar had been dissatisfied with German musician Peter Feuchtwanger's attempt to adapt the same raga. Later in 1966, on Menuhin and Shankar's Grammy Award-winning album West Meets East, Barham supplied liner notes, explaining the various musical terms particular to Indian music.

He served as musical annotator on several subsequent East–West collaborations by Shankar, who described him as "a brilliant young pianist". One such project was Shankar's score for Alice in Wonderland (1966), a BBC TV film directed by Jonathan Miller.

== Association with George Harrison ==
During this period, Barham met George Harrison of the Beatles through Shankar, who had adopted the guitarist as his sitar student. Harrison was fascinated by Barham's interpretations of ragas, and based his 1967 song "Blue Jay Way" on a piano piece that Barham had derived from Raga Marwa. In March 1967, Barham attended the recording session for Harrison's Indian-styled composition "Within You, Without You", released on the Beatles' seminal album Sgt. Pepper's Lonely Hearts Club Band. Barham later wrote the choral arrangements for Phil Spector's controversial production of "The Long and Winding Road" and "Across the Universe", issued on the band's final album, Let It Be (1970).

Several commentators credit Harrison as the person most responsible for Indian music's surge in popularity in the West from 1966 onwards, via his work with the Beatles and his public endorsement of Shankar. Among these, author Simon Leng has described Barham as both a "birth partner" and the "closest confidant and fellow traveler" to Harrison during the latter's immersion in the genre.

=== Harrison solo albums ===
Barham played a key collaborative role on Harrison's soundtrack to the Joe Massot-directed film Wonderwall (1968). In addition to participating in recording sessions held at London's Abbey Road Studios in late 1967, Barham transcribed Harrison's melodies into an annotation that the Beatle was then able to share with Indian musicians in Bombay, where part of the album was recorded in January 1968. Released as Wonderwall Music, and described by author Peter Lavezzoli as "a charming potpourri of Indian and Western sounds", it features Barham on piano, harmonium and flugelhorn, and in the role of orchestral arranger.

Following the Beatles' break-up in April 1970, Barham supplied the orchestral arrangements on Harrison's acclaimed triple album All Things Must Pass (1970). The album was co-produced by Spector, whose "distant and authoritarian" style Barham says he found difficult to adapt to after the "intimate, friendly atmosphere" typical of Harrison sessions. The songs to which Barham contributed include the international hits "My Sweet Lord" and "What Is Life", the album's title track, and "Isn't It a Pity". The last of these, Leng writes, "captures the depth of the musical understanding between George Harrison and John Barham", in the interplay between slide guitar, orchestra and choir.

Barham provided the orchestration for Harrison's successful follow-up to All Things Must Pass, Living in the Material World (1973). His arrangements on that album include the string, brass and choral parts on "The Day the World Gets 'Round", "Who Can See It" and "That Is All".

=== Other Beatles-related recordings ===
Barham also worked on Harrison's projects with acts signed to the Beatles' Apple record label. Among these releases was Is This What You Want? (1969) by Jackie Lomax, That's the Way God Planned It (1969) by Billy Preston, and Radha Krishna Temple (London)'s 1970 hit single "Govinda". The latter was a musical adaptation of a sacred Hindu poem from the Satya Yuga. Through his connection with Harrison, Barham also played harpsichord on Yoko Ono's "Who Has Seen the Wind?", released in February 1970 as the B-side to John Lennon's Spector-produced single "Instant Karma!"

Following the success of All Things Must Pass, Barham contributed to Ronnie Spector's "Try Some, Buy Some" single, Lennon's song "Jealous Guy" (from Imagine) and Gary Wright's album Footprint, all recorded in 1971. He has said of working with Wright and Harrison that "there was a strong [musical] rapport among the three of us" and describes Wright's song "Love to Survive" as "one of the most emotionally powerful love songs that I have ever worked on". In his book Phil Spector: Out of His Head, music journalist Richard Williams writes of Barham's orchestration on "Try Some, Buy Some": "[The strings and mandolins] sweep and soar in great blocks of sound, pirouetting around each other like a corps de ballet in slow motion. The closing portions of the orchestral arrangement are breathtaking, displaying a geometrical logic which makes use of suspended rhythms drawn out to screaming point."

== Production for Quintessence and Jugalbandi album ==
Barham became involved in music production in the late 1960s, working with Quintessence. The latter were a Notting Hill-based progressive rock band who, like Harrison, incorporated a Hindu-aligned spiritual message in their music. Barham produced and provided arrangements on the band's first three albums – In Blissful Company, Quintessence and Dive Deep – all released on Island Records between 1969 and 1971. Reviewing Quintessence (1970) in Melody Maker, Richard Williams described Barham's production as "quite superb". In a 2014 feature article on Quintessence, for Record Collector, Colin Harper praised Barham's contributions to the band's work, labelling him "their very own George Martin … honing their onstage magic into sublime studio sculptures". Following singer Shiva Shankar Jones's departure from Quintessence, Barham produced his new band's eponymous album, Kala (1972).

In 1973, Barham and Indian sarod player Aashish Khan released an album on Elektra Records, titled Jugalbandi – the word commonly used for duets in Hindustani classical music. Produced by Barham, with tabla accompaniment from Zakir Hussain, the album featured a piece called "Piano Solos", on which he combined the ragas Nat Bhairav, Brindavani Tilang, Marwa and Mishra-Kalavati. Asked in a 2009 online interview about the long-unavailable Jugalbandi, Barham said: "I haven't composed any more music like that, although I still do compose regularly, but in a more Western style."

== Work on film soundtracks and in music education ==
Among his work in films, Barham provided the soundtrack for El Topo (1970), directed by Alejandro Jodorowsky. In 1979, he arranged Richard and Gary Logan's score for The Human Factor, the final film by director Otto Preminger. Barham's Indian compositions have featured in BBC documentaries by director Manjira Dhatta. He also supplied the musical score for one of Katharine Hepburn's last screen appearances, before her retirement from acting in 1994.

His teaching activities have included a role as tutor in Schenkerian analysis at Trinity College of Music, London. Barham also taught at the Achimota School in Ghana, where William Chapman Nyaho was among his students.

== Later projects ==
In 1996, Barham collaborated again with Shankar and Harrison on the album Chants of India (1997), providing Western annotation for some of the musicians at Harrison's Friar Park studio, in Henley, Oxfordshire. Chants of India was one of Shankar's favourite releases among his six decades of recordings, and Barham has said of his own role in the project: "it was a pleasure working on this beautiful record." In August 2000, just over a year before Harrison's death, he and Barham met at a local performance of a choral work by Jon Lord, which Barham was conducting, where Harrison asked him to supply an orchestral arrangement for a new song he had recorded.

Barham has played or collaborated with a number of other significant figures in the entertainment industry, including Elton John, André Previn, Roger Daltrey, Gene Pitney and Badfinger. With Simon Leng and former Splinter songwriter Bob Purvis, he formed Inscribe Music in 2007, a company providing services in composing and producing music. Late that year, as part of an initiative by Inscribe, Barham worked with Newcastle College in the north-east of England on a recording of Purvis's song "Sail Away", for release as a single to benefit Cancer Research UK. In line with his past achievements in promoting Indian music, the company sought to establish partnerships in the Indian film industry.

In June 2010, Barham reunited with Quintessence when the band performed at the 40th Anniversary Glastonbury Festival. He subsequently produced their live album Rebirth: Live at Glastonbury 2010, for which he is also credited as a composer and liner-note writer.

== Sources ==
- Harry Castleman & Walter J. Podrazik, All Together Now: The First Complete Beatles Discography 1961–1975, Ballantine Books (New York, NY, 1976; ISBN 0-345-25680-8).
- Alan Clayson, George Harrison, Sanctuary (London, 2003; ISBN 1-86074-489-3).
- Joshua M. Greene, Here Comes the Sun: The Spiritual and Musical Journey of George Harrison, John Wiley & Sons (Hoboken, NJ, 2006; ISBN 978-0-470-12780-3).
- Peter Lavezzoli, The Dawn of Indian Music in the West, Continuum (New York, NY, 2006; ISBN 0-8264-2819-3).
- Simon Leng, While My Guitar Gently Weeps: The Music of George Harrison, Hal Leonard (Milwaukee, WI, 2006; ISBN 1-4234-0609-5).
- Mark Lewisohn, The Complete Beatles Chronicle: The Definitive Day-By-Day Guide to the Beatles' Entire Career, Chicago Review Press (Chicago, IL, 2010; ISBN 978-1-56976-534-0).
- Mojo: The Beatles' Final Years Special Edition, Emap (London, 2003).
- Nat Segaloff, Final Cuts: The Last Films of 50 Great Directors, BearManor Media (Duncan, OK, 2013; ISBN 978-1-59393-233-6).
- Ravi Shankar, Raga Mala: The Autobiography of Ravi Shankar, Welcome Rain (New York, NY, 1999; ISBN 1-56649-104-5).
- Bruce Spizer, The Beatles Solo on Apple Records, 498 Productions (New Orleans, LA, 2005; ISBN 0-9662649-5-9).
- Richard Williams, Phil Spector: Out of His Head, Omnibus Press (London, 2003; ISBN 978-0-7119-9864-3).
- World Music: The Rough Guide (Volume 2: Latin and North America, Caribbean, India, Asia and Pacific), Rough Guides/Penguin (London, 2000; ISBN 1-85828-636-0).
