= Twisted (Hallucinogen album) =

Studio album by Hallucinogen
- Released: 16 October 1995
- Genre: Psychedelic trance, Goa trance
- Length: 74:04
- Label: Dragonfly Records
- Producer: Simon Posford

Hallucinogen chronology
Twisted (1995)	The Lone Deranger (1996)

Professional ratings
Review scores
Source	Rating
Allmusic	4/5 stars

Twisted is the debut studio album by Hallucinogen, released on 16 October 1995 on Dragonfly Records.

The album reached Number 27 in the French album charts, and it is one of the most successful albums releases in the psychedelic trance genre, with a total sales over 85,000 copies worldwide. In 1999, the album was re-released on Simon Posford's (Hallucinogen) own label, Twisted Records.

The first track on the album, "LSD", was widely played.

== Track listing ==
1. "LSD" - 6:45
2. "Orphic Thrench" - 7:25
3. "Alpha Centauri" - 10:16
4. "Dark Magus" - 7:31
5. "Shamanix" - 10:00
6. "Snarling Black Mabel" - 7:45
7. "Fluoro Neuro Sponge" - 6:41
8. "Solstice" - 17:41
- The song "Solstice" ends at minute 8:02. After 6 minutes of silence (8:02 - 14:02), begins a hidden track, which is an early mix of a song that came to be known as "Angelic Particles".

== Samples ==
- "LSD" contains a vocal sample from the BBC documentary The Rise And Fall Of LSD.
- "Shamanix" contains a sample from the movie Altered States.
