= In Blissful Company =

Studio album by Quintessence
- Released: November 1969
- Genre: Psychedelic rock; progressive rock; jazz rock; raga rock
- Length: 38:11; 44:05 (bonus tracks)
- Label: Island
- Producer: John Barham

Quintessence chronology
| In Blissful Company (1969) | Quintessence (1970) |

Professional ratings
Review scores
| Source | Rating |
|---|---|
| AllMusic | 2/5 stars |
| sputnikmusic | 4.0/5 |

In Blissful Company is the first studio album by the English group Quintessence.

== Track listing ==
=== Original LP ===
Side one

1. "Giants" (Raja Ram, Shiva Shankar Jones, Stanley Barr) – 4:37
2. "Manco Capac" (Raja Ram, Shambhu Babaji, Shiva Shankar Jones) – 5:17
3. "Body" (Allan Mostert, Jake Milton, Shambhu Babaji, Shiva Shankar Jones) – 3:34
4. "Gange Mai" (Raja Ram, Shambhu Babaji, Shiva Shankar Jones) – 4:00
5. "Chant" (John Barham, Shiva Shankar Jones) – 3:02

Side two

1. "Pearl and Bird" (Allan Mostert, Raja Ram, Shambhu Babaji) – 3:57
2. "Notting Hill Gate" (Raja Ram, Shiva Shankar Jones) – 4:38
3. "Midnight Mode" (Allan Mostert, John Barham, Raja Ram, Shiva Shankar Jones) – 9:15

=== CD bonus tracks ===
1. "Notting Hill Gate" – 2:31
2. "Move into the Light" – 3:26

== Personnel ==
Quintessence

- Sambhu Babaji – bass guitar
- Maha Dev – rhythm guitar
- Shiva Shankar Jones – lead vocals, keyboards
- Jake Milton – drums
- Allan Mostert – lead guitar
- Raja Ram – flute, bells, percussion

Additional personnel

- John Barham – musical arrangements, musical director
- Mike – sitar
- Surya – tamboura

Technical

- Barney Bubbles, J. Moonman - cover design
- Gopala - front cover artwork, illustration
