= Self (album) =

Studio album / Live album by Quintessence
- Released: May 1972
- Recorded: 1972, except tracks 8 & 9 recorded live at Essex University, 11 December 1971
- Studio: Olympic (London)
- Genre: Psychedelic rock; progressive rock; jazz rock; raga rock
- Length: 44:15; 53:25 (bonus tracks)
- Label: RCA
- Producer: Quintessence

Quintessence chronology
Dive Deep (1971)	Self (1972)	Indweller (1972)

Professional ratings
Review scores
Source	Rating
AllMusic	3.5/5 stars
Record Collector	3/5 stars

Self is the fourth studio album by the English group Quintessence. It was the final album by the band to feature Maha Dev and Shiva Shankar Jones as both were fired from the band by Raja Ram prior to the release of Indweller.

== Track listing ==
Side one – At Olympic Studios 1972

1. "Cosmic Surfer" – 3:48
2. "Wonders of the Universe" – 3:27
3. "Hari Om" (not credited on album) – 0:44
4. "Vishnu Narain" – 6:26
5. "Hallelujad" – 4:14
6. "Celestial Procession" – 1:20
7. "Self" – 3:05

Side two – Live at Exeter University, 11 December 1971

1. "Freedom" – 6:45
2. "Water Goddess" (includes "Gange Mai") – 14:20

=== CD bonus tracks ===
1. "You Never Stay The Same" (single B-side, 1971) – 6:13
2. "Sweet Jesus" (single A-side, 1971) – 2:57

== Personnel ==
- Sambhu Babaji – bass guitar
- Maha Dev – rhythm guitar
- Shiva Shankar Jones – vocals, keyboards
- Jake Milton – drums
- Allan Mostert – lead guitar
- Raja Ram – flute, percussion
