= Is This What You Want? =

Studio album by Jackie Lomax
- Released: 21 March 1969
- Recorded: June – August 1968; October 1968 – January 1969
- Studios: Sound Recorders, Los Angeles; EMI and Trident, London
- Genres: Rock, soul
- Length: 40:09 (UK version); 39:14 (US version)
- Label: Apple
- Producers: George Harrison; Jackie Lomax and Mal Evans (US version only)

Jackie Lomax chronology
Is This What You Want? (1969)	Home Is in My Head (1971)

Singles from Is This What You Want?
- 1. "New Day" Released: 9 May 1969 (UK) 2 June 1969 (US)

Is This What You Want? is the debut album by the English rock and soul singer Jackie Lomax, released in 1969 on the Beatles' Apple record label. It was produced by George Harrison and features contributions from Harrison's Beatles bandmates Paul McCartney and Ringo Starr. The album includes Lomax's debut single for Apple, the Harrison-written "Sour Milk Sea". The US version added "New Day", which was produced by Lomax and released as a non-album single in Britain.

The recording sessions for Is This What You Want? began in London in June 1968. The majority of the songs were recorded in Los Angeles in October–November that year, after Harrison had completed work on the Beatles' self-titled double album (also known as the "White Album"). Among the other guest musicians were members of the Wrecking Crew, Eric Clapton, Nicky Hopkins, Klaus Voormann and John Barham. Although the album received favourable reviews, it failed to achieve commercial success. The 2010 reissue includes bonus tracks covering the rest of Lomax's output while on Apple Records.

== Background ==
Jackie Lomax, a Liverpudlian, first met the Beatles while performing in Liverpool and Hamburg in the early 1960s as the lead singer of the Undertakers. In 1967, he signed to the Beatles' Apple Publishing as an in-house songwriter, recording demos of his songs at the company's original headquarters, on Baker Street in central London. John Lennon was the first to suggest he should consider becoming a solo artist, and with the formation of Apple Records in early 1968, George Harrison committed to producing an album by Lomax on the new label. Lomax later said he was concerned that the album might never get made since he was unsure whether Harrison would ever come back from India, where the Beatles were attending Maharishi Mahesh Yogi's Transcendental Meditation course in the early months of 1968.

Harrison was the last Beatle to return from India, on 21 April, after which he and Lomax ran through material intended for the album at Harrison's Esher bungalow, Kinfauns. Lomax recalls first hearing the song "Sour Milk Sea" there, played by Harrison on acoustic guitar with Lomax accompanying on bass. Among Lomax's own material was the Motown-inspired "Speak to Me", and "Is This What You Want?", a song that has been described as bearing a close resemblance to the Beatles' "I Am the Walrus".

== Production ==
=== London, summer 1968 ===
I don't know if George thought he would have a hit [with Is This What You Want?] Jackie was an old friend who George liked and respected as a musician. At that time, George was just beginning to take an interest in record production and, in some sense, it may be that these productions were his preparatory training for his production on All Things Must Pass.

— Musical arranger John Barham

Recording for Is This What You Want? began at EMI Studios in London in June 1968 and continued through the summer in between Harrison's work on the Beatles' self-titled double album (also known as the "White Album"). While working alone at Trident Studios, down the hall from where the band were recording, Lomax was invited to add backing vocals to "Dear Prudence" in late August; he had also joined the backing chorus for "Hey Jude" earlier that month. The songs recorded included "Sour Milk Sea" and "The Eagle Laughs at You", for the A- and B-side of Lomax's debut single on Apple, and "You've Got Me Thinking".

Among the guest musicians on the London sessions, much of which would go unused, were Eric Clapton, Ringo Starr, Nicky Hopkins, Klaus Voormann and Paul McCartney. Other participants included drummers Bishop O'Brien and Pete Clark; the former was part of Apple artist James Taylor's backing group, while Clark was the drummer for Lomax's live band. Lomax performed several London gigs during this period.

"Sour Milk Sea" was issued in late August as one of Apple's "Our First Four" single releases, marking the official launch of the label. In an interview to promote the single, Harrison said that the record was indicative of his and Lomax's decision to put artistic merit above the requirement for an "obvious hit", as well as their shared liking of a "heavy, tight [rock] sound". The single received considerable promotion and favourable reviews. It peaked at number 29 on Canada's RPM 100, but failed to achieve commercial success in Britain (where it failed to chart) and America.

=== Los Angeles, October–November 1968 ===
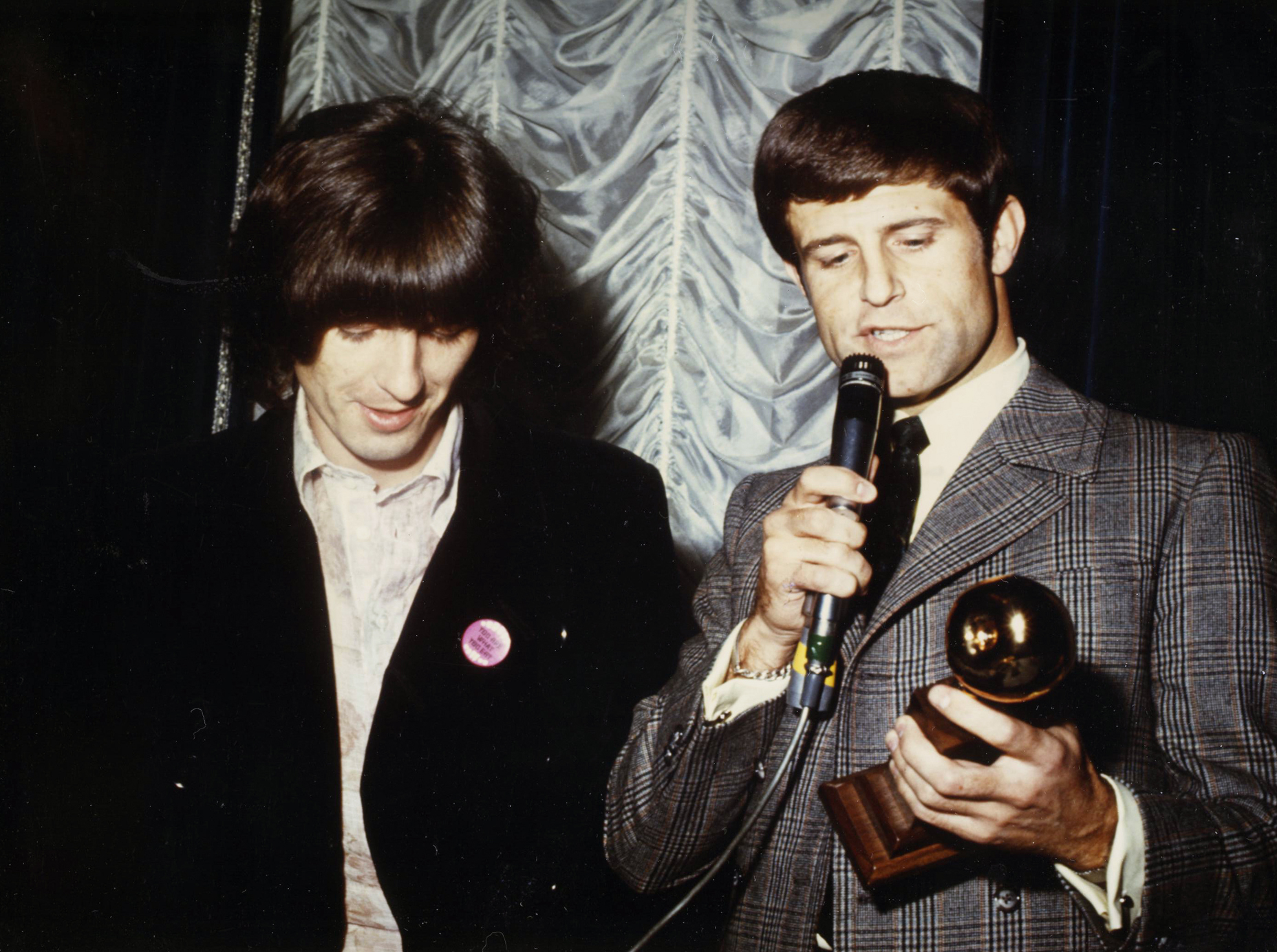
George Harrison (left, with Capitol Records executive Don Grierson), in Los Angeles in October 1968

Following the completion of the White Album, Harrison and Lomax went to Los Angeles to carry out further work on Is This What You Want? The sessions there took place at Sound Recorders Studio from 20 October to 11 November. Seven songs were recorded at this time, six of which were used for the album: "Is This What You Want?", "Speak to Me", "Take My Word", "Baby You're a Lover", "How Can You Say Goodbye" and "Little Yellow Pills". Lomax was supported at these sessions by Harrison (on guitar), Larry Knechtel (keyboards), Joe Osborn (bass) and Hal Blaine (drums) – the latter three among the top LA sessionmen at the time and veterans of Phil Spector's Wrecking Crew. Moog synthesizer pioneers Paul Beaver and Bernie Krause also contributed. Harrison later used a Moog piece played by Krause, recorded in the early hours of 12 November, on his experimental album Electronic Sound. (Note: Intrigued by its potential, Harrison immediately placed an order for a Moog IIIP of his own. He subsequently introduced the synthesizer into the Beatles' sound on their 1969 album Abbey Road.)

The Los Angeles sessions marked the first time that a member of the Beatles had formally recorded in America, and the expense of working there typified the Beatles' commitment to the artists they signed to Apple. Other activities during what author Alan Clayson describes as a "most productive" US visit for Harrison included meeting Delaney Bramlett and Leon Russell for the first time, and recording a rendition of "Nowhere Man" by singer Tiny Tim for inclusion on the Beatles' Christmas 1968 fan-club record. Lomax also carried out radio promotion for the "Sour Milk Sea" single. He later praised Blaine, Knechtel and Osborn for being "tremendous musicians, so quick" and, like Harrison, he would work with Russell in London late the following year.

=== London, December 1968 – January 1969 ===
Recording resumed in London in December 1968, with horns and backing vocals being overdubbed on "Baby You're a Lover" and "You've Got Me Thinking". The album (in its UK version) was completed in London during January 1969, in between Harrison's commitments to the Beatles' ill-fated Get Back project. Although only John Barham would be credited for orchestration on Is This What You Want?, Beatles producer George Martin can be heard on Get Back audio tapes from 10 January wondering whether Harrison, who had just walked out on the band, would be attending a strings overdubbing session Martin had arranged that evening for one of Lomax's tracks.

Harrison originally considered giving his most successful composition, "Something", to Lomax to record, after Lennon and McCartney had shown little interest in it during the Get Back sessions. Harrison instead offered the song to Joe Cocker before the Beatles recorded it for their Abbey Road album.

=== "New Day" and other Apple recordings ===
The US version of Is This What You Want?, which was issued two months after the British release, included "New Day", a Lomax composition that was originally intended as a standalone single. Lomax later said he had to push to persuade Apple that it was worth recording. The sessions in March–April 1969 were his first as a producer, supported by longtime Beatles associate Mal Evans. Lomax also worked closely with Barham on the song's descending brass parts. The backing musicians were previously listed as Clapton, Starr and Billy Preston, but author John Winn states that this is incorrect, given the playing styles heard on the recording and Lomax's subsequent comments. Winn credits Harrison for one of the guitar parts, while Lomax stated that he was also accompanied by his live band at the time: Tim Renwick, Chris Hatfield, Billy Kinsley and Pete Clark.

Lomax recorded a version of Leiber and Stoller's "Thumbin' a Ride" on 11 March, as the B-side to "New Day" in America. "Thumbin' a Ride" was produced by Paul McCartney and featured him on drums, along with Harrison (guitars), Preston (piano and organ) and Klaus Voormann (bass). In addition, "George & Patti and The Rascals" were credited as backing vocalists. An unreleased Lomax composition, "Going Back to Liverpool", was also taped in March 1969, apparently at the same McCartney-produced session. The following day, 12 March, Harrison was overseeing overdubs on these Lomax tracks, before planning to attend McCartney's wedding to Linda Eastman, when Pattie Harrison informed him that the police had just carried out a drugs raid at Kinfauns; a large lump of hashish had been "found" on the floor of their otherwise-tidy home.

Other tracks Lomax recorded for Apple during 1969 included "You Make It With Me", "Can You Hear Me" and "You've Got to Be Strong", the last of which would be rewritten by Doris Troy and released on her own Apple Records album as "I've Got to Be Strong". By this time, Lomax was involved with a band called Heavy Jelly, but he recorded one last single for Apple in October 1969, a Harrison-produced cover of "How the Web Was Woven". Nicky Hopkins was booked to play on the session but was unable to return from Los Angeles in time, and then Harrison was forced to postpone when his mother became seriously ill. Leon Russell agreed to participate on the rescheduled session, and contributed piano, organ and guitar. Lomax had been reluctant to record the song – in a 1974 interview he said that he had to be "pretty well talked into [doing] it" – but he was impressed with Russell's versatility on "How the Web Was Woven", and credited him with also playing the drums on the recording.

== Release and reissue ==
We tried and tried [to make the album a commercial success]. The material was great, but we just couldn't get it to fly ... It looked good, sounded good – and didn't work.

— Apple promotions manager Tony Bramwell

Is This What You Want? was released in the UK on 21 March 1969 (with the Apple catalogue number SAPCOR 6), and in the United States on 19 May (as Apple ST 3354). The accompanying single, "New Day", was issued on 9 May and 2 June, respectively, in Britain and America. Apple promoted Lomax as an enigmatic singer in the mould of Jim Morrison, yet, according to Harrison biographer Simon Leng, the public's response to the suggestive album title was "an apathetic 'no'". (Note: In the US, Apple's trade ad for Is This What You Want? included the line "'Yes' a million times 'yes'" in reply to the question.) The single failed to chart and the album's only placing was number 145 on the Billboard Top LPs listing in the US during a nine-week chart stay.

Author Bill Harry has written that Lomax's lack of chart success "completely baffled The Beatles because Jackie had one of the rare and distinctive voices which have the potential of turning its owner into a superstar". Leng attributes the album's underachievement to the Beatles' inexperience as label owners. He says that they relied too heavily on establishing their artists with a hit single and that, after "Sour Milk Sea" had failed to become a hit, this formula left Is This What You Want? without an adequate marketing strategy. (Note: In a 1970 interview, Lomax cited a lack of support from Apple following the arrival of Allen Klein, who was appointed business manager of the company in May 1969. Lomax said he was about to embark on a UK tour but Klein temporarily froze all expenditure in order to evaluate Apple's financial position.)

The album was issued on CD for the first time in November 1991, with the inclusion of bonus tracks such as "New Day", "Thumbin' a Ride", "How the Web Was Woven" and "Won't You Come Back". The 2010 remaster offered previously unreleased songs recorded during Lomax's two years on Apple Records, as well as additional tracks for download, including alternative mixes of "Sour Milk Sea", "The Eagle Laughs at You" and "New Day". Omitted from this 2010 CD, "Going Back to Liverpool" and the stereo mix of "New Day" instead appeared on the bonus discs included in the 17-disc Apple Box Set.

== Critical reception ==
Professional ratings
Review scores
Source	Rating
AllMusic	3/5 stars
Mojo	3/5 stars
Tom Hull	C
The Village Voice	B

On release, Is This What You Want? received enthusiastic reviews. In a 1970 interview with Robert Greenfield of Rolling Stone, however, Lomax lamented that commentators tended to focus on the line-up of superstar backing musicians, saying, "they're always talkin' about who's on the album and not the album itself." Writing in ZigZag in July 1974, Andy Childs advised the magazine's readers: "it's worth its weight in gold, so if it's absent from your collection, add it to your shopping list of second-hand records." Greenfield and Childs both recognised Harrison's "Sour Milk Sea" as a highlight of the album.

Richie Unterberger of AllMusic offers a less favourable opinion of Is This What You Want?, describing Lomax as "a passable but unarresting singer and songwriter". Unterberger identifies the best moments as the "Beatlesque" songs "Is This What You Want?" and the "uncommonly tender" "Fall Inside Your Eyes". Discussing the 2004 reissue in Record Collector, Terry Staunton described Lomax's style as "[mining] the same seam as Joe Cocker, albeit with a voice neither as distinctive or as powerful" and singled out the "gentle balladry" of "Fall Inside Your Eyes" and "Baby You're A Lover" as highlights. Staunton concluded that Lomax's only Apple album was "a fairly pleasing blue-eyed soul set, which is probably more revered today than it was 35 years ago". Writing in the Encyclopedia of Popular Music, Colin Larkin says that next to the list of celebrated contributors, Lomax's "stylish compositions and superb voice were equal to such esteemed company".

In his preview of the label's 2010 reissues, for Rolling Stone, David Fricke listed it third among his top five non-Beatle Apple albums, writing: "[Is This What You Want?] often sounds like a student edition of Delaney and Bonnie's gospel-spiced R&B with some odd jarring touches … But 'Sour Milk Sea' is dynamite, the title track bears a neat eerie resemblance to 'I Am the Walrus' in the opening measures, and Lomax is a formidable voice, in the gruff, chesty British tradition of Chris Farlowe and Paul Rodgers."

== Track listing ==
All songs by Jackie Lomax, except where noted.

=== Original release ===
Side one

1. "Speak to Me" – 3:06
2. "Is This What You Want?" – 2:44
3. UK version: "How Can You Say Goodbye" – 4:13
3. US version: "New Day" – 3:18
4. "Sunset" – 3:54
5. "Sour Milk Sea" (George Harrison) – 3:51
6. "Fall Inside Your Eyes" – 3:08

Side two

7. "Little Yellow Pills" – 4:01
8. "Take My Word" – 3:55
9. "The Eagle Laughs at You" – 2:22
10. "Baby You're a Lover" – 3:01
11. "You've Got Me Thinking" – 2:53
12. "I Just Don't Know" – 2:53

=== 1991 and 2004 reissues ===
Tracks 1–12 as per original UK release, with the following bonus tracks:

13. "New Day" – 3:15
14. "Won't You Come Back" – 4:10
15. "Going Back to Liverpool" – 3:07
16. "Thumbin' a Ride" (Jerry Leiber, Mike Stoller) – 3:56
17. "How the Web Was Woven" (Clive Westlake, David Most) – 3:50

=== 2010 remaster ===
Tracks 1–12 as per original UK release, with the following bonus tracks:

13. "New Day" [mono single mix] – 2:54
14. "Thumbin' a Ride" (Leiber, Stoller) – 3:56
15. "How the Web Was Woven" (Westlake, Most) – 3:54
16. "You've Got to Be Strong" – 2:53
17. "You Make It with Me" – 2:47
18. "Can You Hear Me" – 2:46

Digital downloads

19. "Going Back to Liverpool" – 3:10
20. "Sour Milk Sea" [mono mix] (Harrison) – 3:57
21. "The Eagle Laughs at You" [mono mix] – 2:31
22. "Little Yellow Pills" [mono mix] – 4:02
23. "New Day" [stereo single mix] – 2:51

== Personnel ==
- Jackie Lomax – vocals, acoustic and electric guitar, bass guitar, backing vocals
- George Harrison – electric and acoustic guitar
- Larry Knechtel – piano, electric piano, organ
- Joe Osborn – bass guitar
- Hal Blaine – drums
- Eric Clapton – electric guitar
- Nicky Hopkins – piano, organ
- Klaus Voormann – bass guitar
- Ringo Starr – drums
- Paul McCartney – drums, bass guitar, electric guitar, backing vocals
- Bishop O'Brien – drums
- Tony Newman – drums
- Alan Branscombe – saxophone
- Spike Heatley – standup bass
- Pete Clark – drums, percussion
- Paul Beaver – Moog synthesizer
- Bernie Krause – Moog synthesizer
- Mal Evans – sound effects
- Alan Pariser – sound effects
- John Barham – string and brass arrangements
- uncredited – female backing vocals
- Tim Renwick – electric guitar (original US version only)
- Chris Hatfield – organ (original US version only)
- Billy Kinsley – bass guitar (original US version only)
- Leon Russell – piano, organ, electric guitar, percussion (reissues only)
- Billy Preston – organ, piano (reissues only)

== Sources ==
- Keith Badman, The Beatles Diary Volume 2: After the Break-Up 1970–2001, Omnibus Press (London, 2001; ISBN 0-7119-8307-0).
- Harry Castleman & Walter J. Podrazik, All Together Now: The First Complete Beatles Discography 1961–1975, Ballantine Books (New York, NY, 1976; ISBN 0-345-25680-8).
- Alan Clayson, George Harrison, Sanctuary (London, 2003; ISBN 1-86074-489-3).
- The Editors of Rolling Stone, Harrison, Rolling Stone Press/Simon & Schuster (New York, NY, 2002; ISBN 0-7432-3581-9).
- Ian Inglis, The Words and Music of George Harrison, Praeger (Santa Barbara, CA, 2010; ISBN 978-0-313-37532-3).
- Simon Leng, While My Guitar Gently Weeps: The Music of George Harrison, Hal Leonard (Milwaukee, WI, 2006; ISBN 1-4234-0609-5).
- Ian MacDonald, Revolution in the Head: The Beatles' Records and the Sixties, Pimlico (London, 1998; ISBN 0-7126-6697-4).
- Barry Miles, The Beatles Diary Volume 1: The Beatles Years, Omnibus Press (London, 2001; ISBN 0-7119-8308-9).
- Mojo Special Limited Edition: 1000 Days of Revolution (The Beatles' Final Years – Jan 1, 1968 to Sept 27, 1970), Emap (London, 2003).
- Chris O'Dell (with Katherine Ketcham), Miss O'Dell: My Hard Days and Long Nights with The Beatles, The Stones, Bob Dylan, Eric Clapton, and the Women They Loved, Touchstone (New York, NY, 2009; ISBN 978-1-4165-9093-4).
- Nicholas Schaffner, The Beatles Forever, McGraw-Hill (New York, NY, 1978; ISBN 0-07-055087-5).
- Bruce Spizer, The Beatles Solo on Apple Records, 498 Productions (New Orleans, LA, 2005; ISBN 0-9662649-5-9).
- Doug Sulpy & Ray Schweighardt, Get Back: The Unauthorized Chronicle of The Beatles' Let It Be Disaster, St. Martin's Griffin (New York, 1997; ISBN 0-312-19981-3).
- Richie Unterberger, The Unreleased Beatles: Music & Film, Backbeat Books (San Francisco, CA, 2006; ISBN 978-0-87930-892-6).
- John C. Winn, That Magic Feeling: The Beatles' Recorded Legacy, Volume Two, 1966–1970, Three Rivers Press (New York, NY, 2009; ISBN 978-0-307-45239-9).
