= The God Particle =

The God Particle may refer to:

- Higgs boson, a particle in physics sometimes referred to, by non-physicists, as the God particle
  - The God Particle (book), a 1993 popular science book by Leon M. Lederman and Dick Teresi
- The God Particle (EP), by the band BUN
- The Cloverfield Paradox, a 2018 American science fiction thriller film originally titled God Particle

== See also ==
- Oh-My-God particle, an ultra-high-energy cosmic ray detected in 1991 over Dugway Proving Ground, Utah, US
