= The Lone Deranger =

Studio album by Hallucinogen
- Released: 1 September 1997
- Genre: Psychedelic trance
- Label: Twisted Records
- Producer: Simon Posford

Hallucinogen chronology
Twisted (1995)	The Lone Deranger (1997)	In Dub (2002)

Professional ratings
Review scores
Source	Rating
AllMusic	link

The Lone Deranger is the second album by Hallucinogen released in 1997 on Twisted Records. The name of the album is word play on the Lone Ranger, a fictional cowboy and hero of several eponymous radio and television series.

== Track listing ==
1. "Demention"
2. "Snakey Shaker"
3. "Trancespotter"
4. "Horrorgram"
5. "Snarling (Remix)"
6. "Gamma Goblins Part 2"
7. "Deranger"
8. "Jiggle of the Sphinx"
9. "Synthesizzler" (bonus track in German release)
