= Dive Deep (Quintessence album) =

Studio album by Quintessence
- Released: March 1971
- Genre: Progressive rock
- Length: 42:05
- Label: Island
- Producers: John Barham, Quintessence

Quintessence chronology
| Quintessence (1970) | Dive Deep (1971) | Self (1972) |

Professional ratings
Review scores
| Source | Rating |
|---|---|
| AllMusic | 2.5/5 stars |

Dive Deep is the third album by the English group Quintessence.

== Track listing ==
Side one

1. "Dive Deep" (Quintessence) – 4:44
2. "Dance for the One" (Quintessence, lyrics by Stanley Barr) – 10:45
3. "Brahman" (Quintessence) – 4:17

Side two

1. "The Seer" (Quintessence) – 6:00
2. "Epitaph for Tomorrow" (Quintessence, lyrics by Stanley Barr) – 8:21
3. "Sri Ram Chant" (Swami Ambikankanda) – 7:58

== Personnel ==
- Sambhu Babaji – bass guitar, Jew's harp, acoustic guitar
- Maha Dev – rhythm guitar
- Shiva Shankar Jones – vocals, keyboards, percussion
- Jake Milton – drums, percussion
- Allan Mostert – lead guitar, veena
- Raja Ram – flute, chimes
