= Indweller =

Studio album by Quintessence
- Released: December 1972
- Recorded: July 1972
- Studio: Morgan (London)
- Genre: Raga rock
- Length: 37:44
- Label: RCA
- Producer: Quintessence

Quintessence chronology
Self (1972)	Indweller (1972)

Professional ratings
Review scores
Source	Rating
Record Collector	2/5 stars

Indweller is the fifth and last album by the English group Quintessence. Maha Dev and Shiva Shankar Jones had been fired from the band prior to the recording of this album, making this the only album on which they do not feature.

The album was aimed more at the popular market than previous works, with fewer extended jams. Record Collector disapproved, writing that "the album constituted a fall from grace."

== Track listing ==
Side one

1. "Jesus My Life" – 3:38
2. "Butterfly Music" – 1:02
3. "It's All the Same" – 7:04
4. "Indweller" – 2:29
5. "Holy Roller" – 4:12
6. "Portable Realm" – 1:29

Side two

1. "Sai Baba" – 3:24
2. "On the Other Side of the Wall" – 3:35
3. "Dedication" – 2:44
4. "Bliss Trip" – 6:19
5. "Mother of the Universe" – 1:45

== Personnel ==
- Sambhu Babaji – bass guitar
- Jake Milton – drums
- Allan Mostert – lead guitar
- Raja Ram – flute
