= Skylon =

Skylon may refer to:

- Skylon (Festival of Britain), a landmark structure of the 1951 Festival of Britain
- Skylon (spacecraft), a proposed orbital spaceplane
- Skylon Tower, an observation tower in Niagara Falls, Ontario
- Skylon (album), a 2008 album by Ott
- "Skylon!", a 2007 song by Gruff Rhys from Candylion
