= Quintessence (Quintessence album) =

Studio album by Quintessence
- Released: June 1970
- Genre: Psychedelic rock; progressive rock; jazz rock; raga rock
- Length: 42:57; 48:05 (bonus track)
- Label: Island
- Producer: John Barham

Quintessence chronology
In Blissful Company (1969)	Quintessence (1970)	Dive Deep (1971)

Professional ratings
Review scores
Source	Rating
AllMusic	3/5 stars

Quintessence is the second studio album by the English group Quintessence.

== Track listing ==
All tracks composed by Quintessence; except where noted.

Side one

1. "Jesus, Buddha, Moses, Gauranga" - 5:01
2. "Sea of Immortality" - 5:19
3. "High on Mt. Kailash (Excerpt From Opera)" (lyrics: Stanley Barr) - 5:51
4. "Burning Bush (Live)" - 2:35
5. "Shiva's Chant" - 2:13

Side two

1. "Prisms (Conception Barham)" - 3:12
2. "Twilight Zones" (lyrics: Stanley Barr) - 5:18
3. "Maha Mantra" - 1:37
4. "Only Love" - 3:54
5. "St. Pancras (Live)" - 6:19
6. "Infinitum (Conception Barham)" - 1:42

=== CD bonus tracks ===
1. "Jesus, Buddha, Moses, Gauranga" - 5:08 (live version)

== Personnel ==
Quintessence

- Sambhu Babaji - bass guitar
- Maha Dev - rhythm guitar
- Shiva Shankar Jones - vocals, keyboards
- Jake Milton - drums
- Allan Mostert - lead guitar
- Raja Ram - flute

with:

- John Barham - arrangements, musical director

Technical

- Richard Polak - front cover photography
- Gopala - paintings
