= List of drama films of the 1940s =

This is a list of drama films of the 1940s.

== 1940 ==
- Brigham Young
- The Grapes of Wrath
- The Great Dictator
- Kitty Foyle
- Knute Rockne, All American
- Lillian Russell
- Rebecca
- The Letter

== 1941 ==
- Citizen Kane
- Here Comes Mr. Jordan
- How Green Was My Valley
- Meet John Doe
- Men of Boys Town
- Sergeant York
- Suspicion
- The Little Foxes

== 1942 ==
- Bambi
- Casablanca
- Joan of Paris
- The Magnificent Ambersons
- Mrs. Miniver
- The Pied Piper
- Pride of the Yankees
- Random Harvest

== 1943 ==
- Day of Wrath
- For Whom the Bell Tolls
- Jane Eyre
- Life and Death of Colonel Blimp
- So Proudly We Hail!
- Song of Bernadette
- Watch on the Rhine

== 1944 ==
- The Children Are Watching Us
- Going My Way
- Lifeboat
- Mr. Skeffington
- Passage to Marseilles
- Secret Command
- Since You Went Away
- Till We Meet Again
- To Have and Have Not
- Wilson

== 1945 ==
- The Bells of St. Mary's
- Brief Encounter
- Children of Paradise
- Corn Is Green
- I Know Where I'm Going!
- Leave Her to Heaven
- Lost Weekend
- Mildred Pierce
- Rome Open City
- The Southerner
- A Tree Grows in Brooklyn
- Week-End at the Waldorf

== 1946 ==
- The Best Years of Our Lives
- Dragonwyck
- Gilda
- Great Expectations
- Humoresque
- It's a Wonderful Life
- Minshū no Teki
- No Regrets for Our Youth
- Paisà
- Utamaro and His Five Women

== 1947 ==
- The Bishop's Wife
- Black Narcissus
- A Double Life
- Gentleman's Agreement
- Miracle on 34th Street
- Monsieur Verdoux
- Mourning Becomes Electra
- Sea of Grass
- Shoeshine

== 1948 ==
- Another Part of the Forest
- Bicycle Thieves
- Corridor of Mirrors
- Drunken Angel
- The Fallen Idol
- Germany Year Zero
- Hamlet
- I Remember Mama
- Joan of Arc
- Johnny Belinda
- Letter from an Unknown Woman
- Oliver Twist
- The Red Shoes
- The Snake Pit
- State of the Union

== 1949 ==
- All the King's Men
- The Blue Lagoon
- Daleká cesta
- Federal Agents vs. Underworld, Inc.
- The File on Thelma Jordon
- The Heiress
- Intruder in the Dust
- Late Spring
- My Foolish Heart
- Ostani Etap
- They Live by Night
- Under Capricorn
