= In Dub – Live =

Live album by Hallucinogen
- Released: 13 May 2009
- Recorded: 25 May 2007 at the Brixton Academy in London
- Genres: Dub, psychedelia, downtempo
- Length: 51:26
- Label: Twisted Records
- Producer: Hallucinogen

Hallucinogen chronology
In Dub (2002)	In Dub – Live (2009)

In Dub – Live is a psychedelic dub album by English musician Hallucinogen, released on 13 May 2009. Most of the tracks are rearrangements of his previous works. The album was recorded live at Brixton Academy, London on 25 May 2007.

== Track listing ==
1. "LSD"
2. "Spiritual Antiseptic"
3. "Cicada"
4. "Solstice"
5. "HiD"
6. "Dark Persuasion"
7. "Angelic Particles"
8. "Rent Boy"
9. "Gamma Goblins"
