= What About Us (The Coasters song) =

1959 song by The Coasters

Single by The Coasters

from the album Coast Along
- A-side: "Run Red Run"
- Released: November 23, 1959
- Genre: R&B
- Length: 2:37
- Label: Atco 6153
- Songwriter(s): Jerry Leiber, Mike Stoller
- Producer(s): Jerry Leiber, Mike Stoller

The Coasters singles chronology
| "Poison Ivy" (1959) | "What About Us" (1959) | "Bésame Mucho" (1960) |

"What About Us" is a song written by Jerry Leiber and Mike Stoller and performed by The Coasters. In the US, the song reached #17 on the R&B chart and #47 on the Billboard Hot 100 in 1959. The song appeared on their 1962 album, Coast Along.

The song was produced by Jerry Leiber, Mike Stoller.

== Other versions ==
- The Undertakers released the song as a single in 1963 in the United Kingdom.
