= Skylon (album) =

Studio album by Ott
- Released: January 25, 2008
- Genre: Dub, ambient
- Length: 69:32
- Label: Twisted Records
- Producer: Ott

Ott chronology
Blumenkraft (2003)	Skylon (2008)	Mir (2011)

Skylon is Ott's second album. It was released on 25 January 2008 by Twisted Records.

== Track listing ==
1. "From Trunch to Stromness" - 11:59
2. "The Queen of All Everything" - 7:52
3. "Rogue Bagel" - 8:29
4. "Daisies and Rubies" - 10:19
5. "Signals from Bob" - 7:48
6. "382 Seaside" - 6:45
7. "Roflcopter" - 7:21
8. "A Shower of Sparks" - 9:00

== Samples ==
Samples can be heard here: Ott at Twisted Music

== Artwork ==
The album art was created by Romanian artist Matei Apostolescu in response to a request for "organic and optimistic" image with "Soviet-era kids and airplanes".

== Reception ==
SputnikMusic gave the album a score of 4 out of 5, calling it "an album for the dreamers", praising it for the "flight into the upper stratosphere" through an "unbelievable landscapes blotted with fluffy clouds and wide blue skies", noting "near flawless melding of picturesque lucidity and tactile production lush with analogue textures and deep, shapely tones".

RateYourMusic gives the album 3.51 out of 5 with listeners being pleased with the album overall, commenting on the relaxing organic feel of the music, which crosses from psybient to dub. At the same time, the listeners consider "The Queen of All Everything" the highlight of the album, after which the album weakens and becomes formulaic.

Other listeners, while praising the album for distancing itself from less inventive psy-dub clichés, still could not find anything that stands out of other psy-chill / psy-dub / ambient dub productions.

Those, for whom Skylon is the only Ott's album they listened to, rate it more favorably, noting that even when the album lacks in inventiveness, it more than makes up for in musicianship and polished production.
