= Younger Brother =

British electronic band

- Origin: England
- Genres: Psytrance, downtempo
- Years active: 2003 - 2014, 2018 - Present
- Label: Twisted Records
- Members: Simon Posford; Benji Vaughan; Ruu Campbell; Marc Brownstein; Tom Hamilton; Joe Russo

Younger Brother is an electronic duo formed in 2003 by Simon Posford and Benji Vaughan. Their debut album A Flock of Bleeps was released in 2003, followed by The Last Days of Gravity in 2007, and Vaccine in 2011.

After making a remix for a charity record, Simon Posford (Shpongle, Hallucinogen) and Benji Vaughan (Prometheus) formed the band.

== Name ==
The band's name is taken from a Kogi prophecy; the Kogi regarded themselves as the Older Brother and say that the destruction of the Earth and environment would be by Westerners called Younger Brother. Simon Posford and Benji Vaughan describe this in the Twisted DVD from 2007 during an interview. Fragments from this prophecy are found in the song "Evil and Harm".

== A Flock of Bleeps ==
The album A Flock of Bleeps, released on Twisted Records, became a cult classic in the underground electronica scene and included such tracks as "Crumblenaut" and "Finger". This led to demand to see them live and they have played shows from London to Tokyo, New York to Moscow.

== Last Days of Gravity ==
Inspired by the live shows, Simon and Benji decided to move away from the pure electronic sound of the first album A Flock of Bleeps and create a more organic sound. Having no band, they played the instruments themselves and recruited long-time friend and former Leftfield vocalist Ruu Campbell to perform the vocals. The resulting album was Last Days of Gravity, with artwork made by Storm Thorgerson, who had also worked on albums by Pink Floyd, Alan Parsons and Led Zeppelin. Released in 2007, the album narrowly missed a nomination for the 2008 Mercury Music Prize and received positive reviews. They also returned to play shows with the "Younger Brother Live" band in Boulder and Denver, Colorado and in California, which included Marc Brownstein (The Disco Biscuits, Electron) on bass, Tom Hamilton (Brothers Past, The American Babies, Electron) on guitar, and Joe Russo (The Benevento/Russo Duo, Furthur, Joe Russo’s Almost Dead, Bustle In Your Hedgerow, The American Babies, Electron) on drums in Japan, the US and the UK.

2009 saw Younger Brother produce "Phoenix in Dynamite Sky" for British cult film Heartless, directed by Philip Ridley.

== Vaccine ==
Their third album Vaccine, recorded with its U.S. band lineup (Marc Brownstein of The Disco Biscuits, Joe Russo of Benevento/Russo Duo and Furthur & Tom Hamilton of Brothers Past), became available on 4 April 2011.

== Vaccine Electronic ==
In 2014, the band developed an app for mobile devices and released an alternate album of remixes titled Vaccine Electronic as a free stream for users who installed it.

On 16 August 2014, Benji Vaughan stated on Younger Brothers' Facebook page that he would "be going quiet for a while" and that "it's time to disappear for a few years".

== Discography ==
=== Albums ===
- A Flock of Bleeps (Twisted Records 2003) - This is Younger Brother's first release as a side project of two prominent psytrance artists.
- The Last Days of Gravity (Twisted Records, 15 October 2007)
- Vaccine (Twisted Records/SCI Fidelity Records, 2011)
- Vaccine Electronic (Younger Brother Records Ltd, 2014)
- Mutually Assured Distraction (Twisted Records, 1 May 2026)

=== EPs ===
- All I Want (Remixes) (Twisted Records, 2008)
- Night Lead Me Astray (EP) (Twisted Records, 2010)
