= How the Web Was Woven =

- UK picture sleeve

Single by Jackie Lomax
- B-side: "Thumbin' a Ride"; "Fall Inside Your Eyes" (US)
- Released: 6 February 1970
- Recorded: October–November 1969
- Genre: Country rock
- Length: 3:52
- Label: Apple
- Songwriter(s): Clive Westlake, David Most
- Producer(s): George Harrison

Jackie Lomax singles chronology
"New Day" (1969)	"How the Web Was Woven" (1970)	"Helluva Woman" (1971)

"How the Web Was Woven" is a song written by English songwriters Clive Westlake and David Most. It was first recorded by rock and soul singer Jackie Lomax and released in February 1970 as his final single on the Beatles' Apple record label. George Harrison produced the recording, which also features contributions from American musician Leon Russell. The single is unique in that, with Paul McCartney producing the B-side, each side was produced by a different member of the Beatles.

Elvis Presley issued a recording of the song later in 1970 on his album That's the Way It Is. Presley's version was also the B-side of his 1971 single "I Just Can't Help Believin'", which became a top-ten hit in Britain and other European countries.

== Composition ==
"How the Web Was Woven" was written in 1969 by Clive Westlake and David Most, the brother of record producer Mickie Most and, at the time, an executive at Carlin Music Publishers. According to Tony Hiller, another London-based songwriter, David Most first approached Australian producer David Mackay with an idea for the song and Mackay provided the melody for the chorus. Westlake and Most completed the song and recorded a demo. This and several other Carlin demos were then submitted as material for Elvis Presley to record via Freddy Bienstock, who owned Carlin and looked after Presley's music publishing interests in the company Hill & Range.

Like other ballads selected for Presley over this period, "How the Web Was Woven" is a love song with a dark theme. It was also typical of the material sourced from Carlin's songwriters in terms of its European pop style, dramatic mood and dense musical arrangement. Most told Record Mirror magazine that it was the third song he had written, after "Goodbye" and "Le Blon", recorded by Barry Ryan and Anita Harris, respectively. He also said that Percy Sledge was the singer he "had in mind" when writing the song.

== Jackie Lomax version ==
"How the Web Was Woven" was first recorded in London by Jackie Lomax. The sessions took place in October and November 1969 and were produced by George Harrison for the Beatles' Apple record label. Having fallen out with Apple since Allen Klein's appointment as the company's business manager in May 1969, Lomax was reluctant to record the song. Harrison recognised the importance of the piano part and initially booked session pianist Nicky Hopkins to play on the track, but Hopkins became unavailable. The recording instead features contributions from American multi-instrumentalist Leon Russell, who was in London to record his debut solo album. In addition to piano, Russell played organ and guitar on the track. According to Most, Harrison also played guitar on the recording, which he described as an "up-tempo" version.

The song was Lomax's final single on Apple Records. The B-side of the UK release – a cover of Leiber and Stoller's "Thumbin' a Ride" – was produced by Paul McCartney, making "How the Web Was Woven" the only single to have its A-side produced by one member of the Beatles and the B-side by another. The single was issued in the United Kingdom on 6 February 1970 (as Apple 23) and on 9 March in the United States (as Apple 1819), where the previously released "Fall Inside Your Eyes" was the B-side. As with Lomax's previous singles for the label, it failed to chart.

"How the Web Was Woven" was included as a bonus track on the 2010 reissue of Lomax's 1969 album Is This What You Want? Writing in 2013, Danny Eccleston of Mojo magazine described the recording as "a terrific, rough-and-ready version of this Clive Westlake/David Most tune" aided by "[Lomax's] authentic country-soul phrasing and the quality accompaniment by the on-fire Leon Russell".

== Elvis Presley version ==
Presley recorded "How the Web Was Woven" during a five-day period of intensive recording at RCA Studios in Nashville, in early June 1970. Other than for film soundtrack recordings, the sessions were Presley's first since February 1969 and produced a total of 34 tracks, many of them from Bienstock's Carlin catalogue. In return for the prestige associated with having their composition recorded by Presley, Westlake and Most ceded their publishing royalties to him and his manager, Colonel Tom Parker, a situation that was standard for Hill & Range.

The song was released in November 1970 on Presley's album That's the Way It Is. In his review for AllMusic, Stephen Thomas Erlewine includes the track among the album's "perfectly pleasant middle-of-the-road material pitched halfway between Hollywood and Music City". It also appeared as the B-side of "I Just Can't Help Believin'", a single released in November 1971 in markets outside the United States. The single peaked at number 6 on the UK Singles Chart and was also a top-ten hit in Belgium, the Netherlands and South Africa.

== Sources ==
- Harry Castleman & Walter J. Podrazik, All Together Now: The First Complete Beatles Discography 1961–1975, Ballantine Books (New York, NY, 1976; ISBN 0-345-25680-8).
- Paul Guralnick, Careless Love: The Unmaking of Elvis Presley, Abacus (London, 2002; ISBN 0-349-11168-5).
- Ernst Jorgensen, Elvis Presley: A Life in Music – The Complete Recording Sessions, St Martin's Press (New York, NY, 1998; ISBN 0-312-18572-3).
- Chris O'Dell (with Katherine Ketcham), Miss O'Dell: My Hard Days and Long Nights with The Beatles, The Stones, Bob Dylan, Eric Clapton, and the Women They Loved, Touchstone (New York, NY, 2009; ISBN 978-1-4165-9093-4).
- Alan Richards, "That's Livin', Alright": A Biography/Memoirs on the Life of Australian Record Producer David Mackay, lulu.com (2016; ISBN 978-1-32679980-9).
- Paul Simpson, The Rough Guide to Elvis, Rough Guides (London, 2004; ISBN 1-84353-417-7).
