= List of drama films of the 1930s =

This is a list of drama films of the 1930s.

== 1930 ==
- Blue Angel
- Earth
- Morocco
- Under the Roofs of Paris

== 1931 ==
- The Champ
- La Chienne
- Kameradschaft
- Mädchen in Uniform

== 1932 ==
- Freaks
- Grand Hotel
- I Am a Fugitive from a Chain Gang
- The Mouthpiece
- Rain
- Shanghai Express
- Vanity Fair

== 1933 ==
- Apart from You
- Counsellor at Law
- Ecstasy
- The Power and the Glory
- Taki No Shiraito
- Wild Boys of the Road
- Zéro de conduite

== 1934 ==
- L'Atalante
- The Barretts of Wimpole Street
- Man's Way with Women
- Manhattan Melodrama
- Les Misérables
- Of Human Bondage
- Toni

== 1935 ==
- Born to Gamble
- David Copperfield
- Million Dollar Haul
- A Tale of Two Cities

== 1936 ==
- La belle équipe
- Camille
- Come and Get It
- Dodsworth
- Fury
- Osaka Elegy
- The Petrified Forest
- Reefer Madness
- Romeo and Juliet
- San Francisco
- Sisters of the Gion

== 1937 ==
- Dead End
- The Good Earth
- Grand Illusion
- The Life of Emile Zola
- Pépé le Moko
- A Star is Born
- Stella Dallas
- Topper

== 1938 ==
- Angels with Dirty Faces
- La Bête Humaine
- Boys Town
- A Christmas Carol
- The Citadel
- In Old Chicago
- J'accuse
- Jezebel
- The Song of the Scarlet Flower

== 1939 ==
- Dark Victory
- Gone with the Wind
- Goodbye, Mr. Chips
- Hunchback of Notre Dame
- Jamaica Inn
- Of Mice and Men
- The Rules of the Game
- The Stars Look Down
- Wuthering Heights
- The Zero Hour
