= Jackie Lomax =

English guitarist and singer-songwriter (1944–2013)

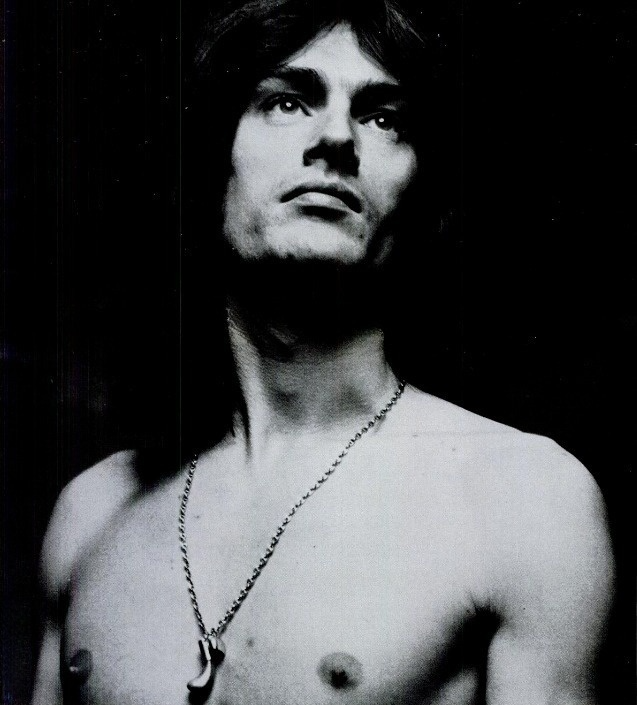
- Billboard ad, 1969

Background information
- Born: John Richard Lomax; 10 May 1944; Wallasey, Cheshire, England
- Died: 15 September 2013 (aged 69) Wirral, England
- Genre: Rock
- Occupations: Musician; singer; songwriter
- Instruments: Vocals; guitar
- Years active: 1968–2013
- Labels: Apple, Capitol, Warner Bros.
- Website: www.jackielomax.com

John Richard Lomax (10 May 1944 – 15 September 2013) was an English guitarist and singer-songwriter. He is best known for his association with George Harrison, who produced Lomax's recordings for the Beatles' Apple record label in the late 1960s.

John Richard Lomax was born in 1944 in Wallasey, Cheshire. He was a member of Dee and the Dynamites, The Undertakers, The Lomax Alliance, Heavy Jelly and Badger. He worked with The Tea Bags, George Harrison, Eric Clapton, Jeff Beck, Leon Russell and Nicky Hopkins.

== Career ==
=== 1962–1970 ===
In January 1962, Jackie Lomax left Dee and the Dynamites to join the Merseybeat band The Undertakers. They followed The Beatles' route through local venues before setting out for Hamburg, Germany, and securing a recording contract. They signed with Pye Records and released four singles, but they managed only one week on the UK Singles Chart with "Just a Little Bit" (No. 49 in 1964). In 1965 they decided to try their luck in the United States.

Lomax spent two years in the US with The Undertakers and a couple of other groups. In 1967, Brian Epstein took his latest line-up, The Lomax Alliance, back to the UK to showcase them at London's Saville Theatre. He arranged for a single and an album to be recorded, and they signed to CBS before Epstein's death. During that period, CBS released two Lomax Alliance singles and one Jackie Lomax solo single. More than enough tracks for an album were recorded but it was never released.

After Epstein's death, The Beatles' new record label, Apple Records, took over responsibility for Lomax's recording career, and George Harrison became involved in production. Despite having three-quarters of The Beatles on the record, plus Eric Clapton and Nicky Hopkins, Lomax's 1968 debut single on Apple, the Harrison-penned "Sour Milk Sea", backed with "The Eagle Laughs at You" written by Lomax, made little commercial impression. Lomax and Harrison recorded the remainder of the Is This What You Want? album in Los Angeles, with Hal Blaine and other members of the Wrecking Crew; but as with the concurrent single, the Lomax-produced "New Day", success remained elusive when the album was released in early 1969. A final Apple single followed, a cover version of "How the Web Was Woven" featuring Leon Russell. By 1970, The Beatles' breakup left the remaining Apple Records artists in limbo.

=== 1970–1977 ===
After leaving Apple, Lomax joined a band called Heavy Jelly. The band began as a hoax review in Time Out magazine. Guitarist John Morshead from The Aynsley Dunbar Retaliation and three ringers had posed for the "group's" photo in the magazine, so to cash in on the buzz Morshead and drummer Carlo Little released a single on promoter John Curd's Head Records ("Chewn In"/"Time Out", Head HDS4001, 1969). They were beaten to the punch however by the group Skip Bifferty who released their own single as Heavy Jelly, "I Keep Singing That Same Old Song" b/w "Blue", on Island Records. The A-side became fairly well known at the time from its inclusion on the Island sampler album, Nice Enough to Eat. Curd owned the rights to the name however, and stopped Island from releasing any other Heavy Jelly productions. Guitarist Morshead, along with his former Aynsley Dunbar mate bassist Alex Dmochowski, formed another version of Heavy Jelly with Jackie Lomax. Mike Kellie from Spooky Tooth drummed on some sessions but was later replaced by Barry Jenkins, formerly of The Animals. Also helping out were the Badfinger duo of Pete Ham and Tom Evans on backing vocals and "horn section to the stars" Bobby Keys and Jim Price.

The self-titled Heavy Jelly album was recorded, entirely consisting of Lomax songs, but was issued only for promotional purposes and never released commercially due to contractual issues with Apple. After the album was finished, the band began touring but was bedeviled by line-up changes. Drummer Dave Rowland and bassist Steve Thompson were with the group at one point. After a few months the band disintegrated. (In December 2013, it was announced that after Lomax's untimely death his family resolved all issues with Apple amicably and the album was re-leased on Angel Air Records on 10 March 2014.)

Confusing matters further, another Heavy Jelly, produced by Simon Napier-Bell, released their only single in the U.S. and France on Avco Embassy, "Humpty Dumpty" b/w "Throw Down a Line", in a nice picture sleeve. This may have been a studio group since both sides were written by producer Napier-Bell and vocalist and sometime partner Ray Singer. In 1971, Lomax returned to the US to live and work in Woodstock, New York. He signed to Warner Bros. Records and reunited with members of the Lomax Alliance and The Undertakers. They returned to the recording studio but their albums, Home is in My Head and Three, failed to sell.

Disappointed with his lack of success, Lomax returned to the UK at the end of 1973. He joined Badger, a progressive rock band originally formed by ex-Yes keyboard player Tony Kaye, and turned them into a R&B and soul band he had used on his solo albums. The band became a vehicle for Lomax's songs and singing but was short-lived, releasing only one album, the Allen Toussaint-produced White Lady, on Epic Records.

Lomax crossed the Atlantic again to resume his solo career and Capitol Records signed him in 1975. He released two Capitol albums, Livin' for Lovin' and Did You Ever Have That Feeling?, before leaving the label in 1977. The latter set was released only in the UK.

=== 1978–2000 ===
The 1980s were a quiet time in Lomax's career. In the mid-1980s he played guitar and sang background vocals on demos for various artists, produced by his friend Patrick Landreville. He briefly played with The Tea Bags, a Los Angeles-based group which included Ian Wallace, Kim Gardner, Mick Taylor, Brian Auger, Terry Reid, Peter Banks, Graham Bell and David Mansfield amongst others. In the 1990s, he spent time playing with other British artists on America's West Coast, and he toured as the bassist for The Drifters, The Diamonds, and The Coasters. In California, particularly Ventura County, Lomax played live with a succession of line-ups including Tom Petty, drummer Randall Marsh, Jim Calire, Patrick Landreville and Mitch Kashmar.

In 1990, Lomax recorded the Tim Buckley song, "Devil Eyes" for the True Voices album. Others appearing on the album included Gene Clark, John Stewart, P. F. Sloan and Lucinda Williams.

=== 2001–2013 and after ===
In 2001, Lomax completed the recording of his first solo album since 1977, The Ballad of Liverpool Slim. 2002 saw him continuing to play on the West Coast of America. In 2003, he made a return to The Cavern in Liverpool, where his career began more than 40 years earlier. In 2004, Lomax was a guest on the 'BeatlesandBeyond' Radio Show in Walsall, hosted by Pete Dicks. Dicks later wrote the sleeve notes for, and organised, the UK release of Lomax's The Ballad of Liverpool Slim...and Others album. Lomax would return to Liverpool on several occasions, playing in the Liverpool pub in James Street.

Percy Sledge included Lomax's song, "Fall Inside Your Eyes", on his 2004 album Shining Through The Rain.

During his last few years, Lomax was a regular visitor to Parrjazz at Studio 2, Liverpool, where his music was always warmly appreciated by an enthusiastic audience.

On 13 April 2012, Lomax played on the 50th Anniversary of the Hamburg-based Star-Club in the Kaiserkeller, with the Star Club All-Star-Band plus Brian Griffiths (Big Three), Bobby Thompson (Dominoes), and Joe Fagin (Strangers), and also with The Undertakers.

During his last years, Lomax resided in Ojai, California, United States, with his wife, Annie (previously Norma Richardson), mother of fashion photographer Terry Richardson. On 15 September 2013, Lomax died from cancer, on the Wirral while staying in England for the wedding of his daughter.

In 2019, one of his songs, "New Day", from the album Is This What You Want?, was used for a cricket commercial for UK sports channel, Sky Sports. It featured a reworked version by Irish female singer Lyra. Her version was also used in a commercial for Dutch bike company VanMoof in 2020, after which it was released as a single.

== Recordings ==
- The Undertakers Unearthed 1963–65
- The Lomax Alliance and CBS Recordings 1966–1967
- Is This What You Want? 1969 No. 145 US
- Heavy Jelly: Heavy Jelly 1970
- Home Is in My Head 1971 - AUS No. 34
- Three 1972
- Livin' For Lovin' 1976
- Did You Ever Have That Feeling? 1977
- True Voices (Various Artists) 1991
- The Ballad of Liverpool Slim 2001 & 2004
- The Ballad of Liverpool Slim...and Others (Angel Air Records)
- Against All Odds (Angel Air Records) 2014

== Badger ==
- White Lady – With Tony Kaye, ex-Yes
