= In Dub (Hallucinogen album) =

Remix album by Hallucinogen
- Released: 5 November 2002
- Genres: Dub, psychedelia
- Length: 59:49
- Label: Twisted Records
- Producer: Ott

Hallucinogen chronology
The Lone Deranger (1996)	In Dub (2002)	In Dub - Live (2009)

Professional ratings
Review scores
Source	Rating
Allmusic	link

In Dub is a psychedelic dub album released in October 2002. It is a collection of Hallucinogen tracks remixed by the record producer Ott.

== Track listing ==
1. "Mi-Loony-Um ('A Floating Butterfly Stings Like a Bee' Mix)"
2. "Solstice ('Warwick Bassmonkey' Mix)"
3. "Gamma Goblins ('It's Turtles All the Way Down' Mix)"
4. "Spiritual Antiseptic ('Minty Fresh Confidence' Mix)"
5. "L.S.D. ('World Sheet of Closed String' Mix)"
6. "Angelic Particles ('Buckminster Fullerine' Mix)"
