= The Undertakers (band) =

British beat music group

- Origin: Liverpool, England
- Genres: Beat, pop
- Years active: 1961–present
- Label: Pye Records
- Members: Tony Schofield; Les Jones; Mike Bennett; Colin Gort; Linda Campbell
- Past members: Jackie Lomax; Brian Jones; Chris Huston; Geoff Nugent; Bugs Pemberton; Bob Evans; Dave "Mushy" Cooper; Dennis Barton; Beryl Marsden; Jimmy McManus; Bugs Pemberton; Tommy Bennett; George Roberts; Billy Good; Jimmy O'Brien; Chris Evans; Baz Davies; Ray Kelly; Tim Ready; Kevin Murphy; Tony Stott; Les Cave

The Undertakers are a British beat group, contemporaries of the Beatles and a leading group in the Merseybeat music scene of the early 1960s.

== History ==
=== Origins ===
The Undertakers were originally called Bob Evans and the Five Shillings, with Nugent; lead guitarist Ike X (replaced by Pete Cook (ex the Topspots); drummer Bob Evans (died March 2009) (ex the Renegades); bassist Billy Evans; tenor saxophone player Les Maguire (born Leslie Charles Maguire, 27 December 1941, in Wallasey, Cheshire) and rhythm guitarist, vocalist Mike Millward (born Michael Millward, 9 May 1942, Bromborough, Cheshire - died 7 March 1966, at Bromborough Hospital, Bromborough), who was later in the Fourmost.

Then they became the Vegas Five formed in 1959, a group led by drummer Bob Evans with Geoff Nugent, died 12 October 2014; Chris Huston (ex the Casuals); lead vocalist Jimmy McManus (ex the Topspots); bassist Mushy Cooper (born David Cooper died in 1998) (ex the Topspots) and Les Maguire, who was later in Gerry and the Pacemakers, replaced by alto / tenor sax player, vocalist Brian (Sax) Jones (ex the Rebels) (born 27 November 1940 in Wallasey, Cheshire). This was one of the first rock and roll groups in the Liverpool area.

=== Group career ===
When the Vegas Five were booked to play a dance, they discovered that the local newspaper had inadvertently transposed their name with the word "Undertakers" from the adjacent column. The promoter persuaded them to develop this as a gimmick, by playing the "Death March" to start their show, and to change their name. In February 1961, Evans' group merged with another group, Dee and the Dynamites, based in Wallasey, and Evans left to be replaced by Pemberton (ex Dee and the Dynamites) in September 1961.

The Undertakers developed a major local following for their live performances. This was due to the quality of Lomax's singing, the customisation of the band's instruments and amplification by Huston, and the fact that, unlike most Merseybeat groups, they were boosted by a saxophone, which enabled them to play a wider range of R&B songs including more obscure material. There is a photograph of fans queueing at the Cavern for what was thought to be the Beatles, when they were in fact queueing for the Undertakers.

They played at Hamburg’s Star-Club during 1962. However, on their return, they rejected a management offer from Brian Epstein, and signed a recording contract with Pye Records with Tony Hatch as their record producer. The records they made with Pye were weak both in terms of their sound and commercial success, although their third single, "Just a Little Bit", managed one week on the Top 50 in the UK Singles Chart in April 1964. The song was later covered by Slade and Rory Gallagher.

=== Later years ===
The Undertakers split up after a tour of the United States in 1965, with Lomax, Huston and Pemberton all remaining in that country and developing their own careers in the music industry. Brian Jones became a session player and is sometimes claimed to have played saxophone on the Beatles' "You Know My Name (Look Up the Number)", a claim which he denies, saying that it was "the Brian Jones who couldn't swim," and, in fact, most sources do state that the part was played by Brian Jones of the Rolling Stones. (These sources include the Beatles' Paul McCartney and the Rolling Stones' then-bassist Bill Wyman). Pemberton lived in Los Angeles, California. They had many changes. When Brian Jones returned from America he and Geoff Nugent formed the New Undertakers with three members of the Newtowns:

Geoff Nugent	vocals rhythm/lead guitar
Brian Jones	tenor sax/vocals
Jim Jones	bass guitar
Bob Frazer	keyboards
Bob Williams	drums

Geoff Nugent re-formed the band for the Liverpool Garden Festival and in 2007 settled on a line-up of

Geoff Nugent	vocals /rhythm guitar
Brian Jones	tenor sax
Bill Good	bass guitar /vocals
Baz Davies	lead guitar/vocals
Jimmy O'Brien	drums

When he was home from the US, Jackie Lomax would team up with the band to give three originals in the line-up. Lomax died on the Wirral in September 2013, followed shortly after by Bugs Pemberton who died in Los Angeles on 13 October 2013; both died from cancer related illnesses. Geoff Nugent died 12 October 2014.

In 2018, Brian Jones published his book Sax, Drugs, and Rock 'n' Roll about his experiences in the music industry. He died on 12 October 2026, aged 85.

== Members ==
Their best known line-up was:

- Jackie Lomax – (lead vocals, bass) (born John Richard Lomax, 10 May 1944, Wallasey, Cheshire – died 15 September 2013, Port Sunlight, Wirral)
- Chris Huston – (lead guitar, vocals) (born 25 June 1943)
- Geoff Nugent – (solo, rhythm guitar, vocals) (born Gordon Geoffrey Nugent, 23 February 1943, Garston, Liverpool, Lancashire – died 12 October 2014)
- Brian Jones – (alto, tenor saxophone, vocals) (born 27 November 1940, Wallasey, Cheshire – died 12 October 2026)
- Bugs Pemberton – (drums) (born Warren Pemberton, 7 January 1945, Liverpool – died 13 October 2013, Los Angeles, California)

After Geoff Nugent and Jackie Lomax died, The Undertakers were run by Brian Jones. A later line up consisted of:

- Brian Jones – (alto/tenor sax, vocals)
- Tony Schofield – (rhythm guitar, lead vocals)
- Les Jones – (lead guitar)
- Linda Campbell – (bass guitar, vocals)
- Colin Gort – (keyboards, vocals)
- Mike Bennett – (drums)

== Discography ==
=== UK singles ===
- "Everybody Loves a Lover" (Adler/Allen) / "(Do the) Mashed Potatoes" (Rozier) Pye 7N15543 (1963)
- "What About Us" (Leiber/Stoller) / "Money (That's What I Want)" (Bradford/Gordy) Pye 7N15562 (1963)
- "Just a Little Bit" (Thornton/Thompson/Bass/Washington) / "Stupidity" (Burke) Pye 7N15607 (1964)
- "If You Don't Come Back" (Leiber/Stoller) / "Think" (Pauling) Pye 7N15690 (1964)

=== US singles ===
- "Just A Little Bit" / "Stupidity" Parkway 909 (1964)
- "Think" / "If You Don't Come" Interphon 7709 (1964)
- "I Fell In Love" / "Throw Your Love Away Girl" Black Watch 5545/6 (1965)

=== CD compilation ===
- The Undertakers Unearthed (Big Beat CDWIKD 163, 1996)
