= Shpongle =

English psychedelic electronic music project

- Origin: Chobham, Surrey, England
- Genres: Psybient, psytrance, psydub
- Years active: 1996–present
- Labels: Twisted UK; Kinetic/BMG Records (US)
- Members: Simon Posford; Raja Ram; Michele Adamson; Pete Callard
- Website: www.shponglemusic.com

Shpongle is a psychedelic electronic music project from England that formed in 1996. The group includes Simon Posford and Raja Ram (one of three in The Infinity Project). The duo are considered to be one of the progenitors of the psybient genre — a genre combining world music with psychedelic trance and ambient. Their musical style combines traditional music from all over the world and vocals with contemporary western synthesizer-based psychedelic music. When asked to describe Shpongle's music, Posford has responded that it is "like nothing you've ever heard before."

Shpongle's first track, "Vapour Rumours", was released on TIP Records' Infinite Excursions compilation in 1996. Their debut album, Are You Shpongled?, was released in 1998 on Twisted Records. On 9 September 2014, Posford confirmed beginning work on a sixth album, which was released as Codex VI on 23 October 2017. On 3 October 2017, even before the release of Codex VI, the duo announced via a Facebook video that they have begun working on their seventh studio album. Since 30 June 2017, the duo have also been releasing remasters of their previous albums, focusing on releasing special edition vinyl records.

Posford is generally responsible for the synthesizers, studio work, and live instrumentation, while Raja Ram contributes broad musical concepts and flute arrangements. Raja Ram stated in an interview that "Shpongle" is an umbrella term for feeling positive and euphoric emotions. Shpongle's music is heavily influenced by psychedelic experiences and frequently makes use of sonic textures that approximate psychedelic states as well as vocal samples relating to consciousness expansion, hallucinations, and altered states of awareness. For example, the track "A New Way to Say 'Hooray'" contains a vocal sample of Terence McKenna describing the effects of DMT.

== Shpongle live ==
Shpongle has played several live concerts, and Simon Posford tours frequently, performing live DJ sets. Raja Ram has occasionally accompanied these sets with live flute performances. Shpongle's first live performance was at the Solstice Music Festival at Motosu Highland in Japan in July 2001. They returned to Japan on New Year's Eve 2003 to play the New Maps of Hyperspace event at Tokyo Bay NK Hall together with 1200 Micrograms (featuring Raja Ram) and Hallucinogen.

Prior to the release of their fourth album Shpongle played a sold out live concert at The Roundhouse venue in Chalk Farm, North London on 31 October 2008. The band featured Andy Gangadeen (drums), Nogera (percussion), Chris Taylor (bass), Pete Callard (guitar), Harry Escott (cello), and Dick Trevor (keyboards and programming); Michele Adamson and Hari Om (voices), three dancers, and for one song only ("Nothing is Something Worth Doing") Manu Delago on hand pan.

This was followed on 20 December 2008 by a concert in Moscow featuring the same lineup. Shows were also planned for 7 and 9 March 2009 in Sydney and Melbourne, Australia, but these were cancelled due to non-payment of the deposit by the promoters.

Shpongle performing live at Psy-Fi 2017 in the Netherlands.

In 2009, Shpongle played a headlining date at the Ozora Festival held near Ozora, Hungary on 15 August; Shpongle also played a latenight DJ set at Rothbury Festival in Rothbury, Michigan over Fourth of July weekend and two album launch shows at the Roundhouse on 30 and 31 October. The duo returned to Moscow to play at Milk on 12 December 2009.

On 3 August 2010, they opened the Ozora festival in Hungary. This was their tenth documented live performance.

In January 2011, Shpongle toured Australia, playing dates at the Forum Theatre in Melbourne, the Enmore Theatre in Sydney, and headlining the Rainbow Serpent Festival in Victoria, Australia. In June 2011, Shpongle played at the Electric Forest Festival with the Shpongletron.

New unreleased material from the forthcoming album was incorporated in the 2011 tour, the Shpongletron Experience. The tour featured the Shpongletron, designed by visual artist Zebbler. The Shpongletron included a DJ booth and multiple custom-made, video-mapped projection surfaces.

"Shpongle Live" performed at Camp Bisco X on 8 July 2011 in Mariaville, New York. This was Shpongle's first ever performance as a full ensemble in the United States and was greatly received by fans and newcomers alike. The band also performed two sold-out American shows on Halloween weekend in 2011, playing at the Hammerstein Ballroom in New York City on 28 October, and at the Fox Oakland Theater in Oakland, California on 29 October. They debuted the first track from Museum of Consciousness, called "Brain in a Fish Tank," on 28 October 2011.

For 2012, Shpongle toured the United States performing DJ sets entitled "Shpongle presents The Masquerade". The last set of this tour was performed on 31 October 2012, at Terminal West in Atlanta, Georgia. On 3 November, they performed with Younger Brother, Hallucinogen, and other Twisted Records artists. Their set included live keyboards and flute, and debuted many new tracks from their most recent album.

After the ceremony in 2010, on 6 August 2013 Shpongle is once again opening O.Z.O.R.A. Festival with a world premier concert for their new material called Museum of Consciousness (2013).

Oct. 2013 full band live in London at the Troxy. The show was filmed and is available on DVD, released in 2015.

Shpongle played live with a full 12 piece band at Red Rocks Amphitheater in Morrison, Colorado, on 10 May 2014. The concert was filmed, and released on 23 October 2015 as Shpongle - Live at Red Rocks.

On 19 November 2014, it was announced via social media that Shpongle would once again begin touring in the United States throughout early 2015, featuring Phutureprimitive as special guest, the return of "Shpongletron 3.1," and with visuals by Zebbler.

On 21 September 2018, Shpongle announced their last full public concerts, two consecutive nights at Red Rocks Amphitheatre on 3/4 May 2019:

Although this is their last full public concert, Shpongle will continue to enchant and delight with future studio recordings and album releases, with some Shpongle 7 productions receiving their world premieres at this performance.

== Discography ==
=== Studio albums ===
- Are You Shpongled? (1998)
- Tales of the Inexpressible (2001)
- Nothing Lasts... But Nothing Is Lost (2005)
- Ineffable Mysteries from Shpongleland (2009)
- Museum of Consciousness (2013)
- Codex VI (2017)
- Improvisations for Piano & Flute (as Simon Posford, Raja Ram) (2024)

=== EP albums ===
- Divine Moments of Truth (2000)
- Dorset Perception (2004)
- The God Particle (2010)
- Carnival of Peculiarities (2021)

=== Remix albums ===
- Remixed (2003)
- Unreleased Remixes (2008) (download only)
- Shpongle & Mad Tribe – Stoned Remixes (2016-05-09, Tip Records, download)

=== Other songs ===
- "The Sixth Revelation" on The Mystery of the Thirteen Crystal Skulls (2001)
- "The Seventh Revelation" on The Secret of the Thirteen Crystal Skulls (2003)

=== DVD releases ===
- Live in Concert at the Roundhouse London 2008 (2009)
- Live in London 2014 (2015)
- Live at Red Rocks Amphitheater (2019)
