= Hallucinogen (musician) =

British musician

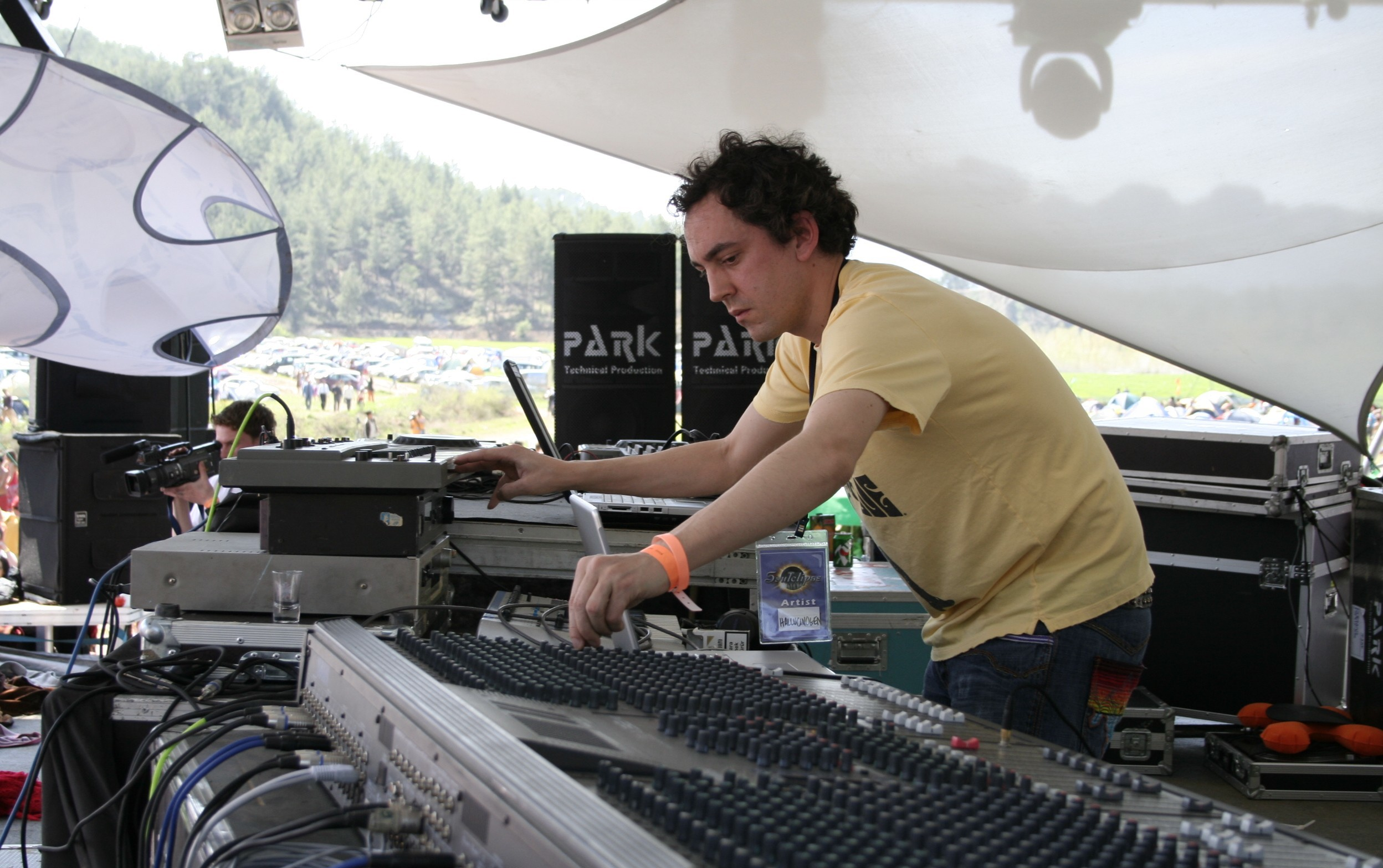
- Simon Posford at Soulclipse in Turkey, March 2006

Background information
- Also known as: Gumbo, Walter Ego
- Born: Simon Posford; 28 October 1971 (age 54)
- Origin: Chobham, Surrey, England
- Genres: Psy Trance, downtempo, Chill-out music
- Occupations: DJ, record producer, sound engineer
- Years active: 1993 – present
- Label: Twisted
- Website: Twisted Records

Simon Posford (born 28 October 1971), better known by his stage name Hallucinogen, is an English electronic musician, specializing in psychedelic trance music. His first studio album, Twisted, released in 1995, is considered one of the most influential albums in the genre.

His second album, The Lone Deranger, was released in 1997. A third album consisting of Hallucinogen tracks remixed by the artist Ott, In Dub, was released in 2002.

He is also the founder of the label Twisted Records and works in the electronic groups Younger Brother and Shpongle. Younger Brother initially began as a side project of Posford and Benji Vaughan and represented a transition away from previous projects which emphasized a more synthesized style.

His grandfather, George Posford, was a composer and producer in the United Kingdom in the 1930s.

== Discography ==
=== Studio albums ===
- Twisted (1995)
- The Lone Deranger (1997)
- In Dub (2002) (Hallucinogen tracks remixed by Ott)
- In Dub - Live (2009)
- Flux & Contemplation - Portrait of an Artist in Isolation (2020) (as Simon Posford)

=== Singles/EPs ===
- "Alpha Centauri" / "LSD" (1994)
- "LSD (Live Mix)" (1995)
- "Angelic Particles" / "Soothsayer" (1995)
- "Fluoro Neuro Sponge" / "Astral Pancakes" (1995)
- "LSD" (1996)
- "Deranger" (1996)
- "Space Pussy" (1996)
- "Mi-Loony-Um!" (2000)
- "LSD (Remixes)" (2003)
- "Pipe Worm (Loud & Domestic Remix)" (2013)
- "Gamma Goblins (Outsiders & Spacecat Remix)" (2019)
- Hallucinogen » Hujaboy » Striders - "Machine Selves" (2020)

== See also ==
- Shpongle
- Younger Brother
- The Infinity Project
- Celtic Cross
- Goa trance
