= Raja Ram (musician) =

Australian musician

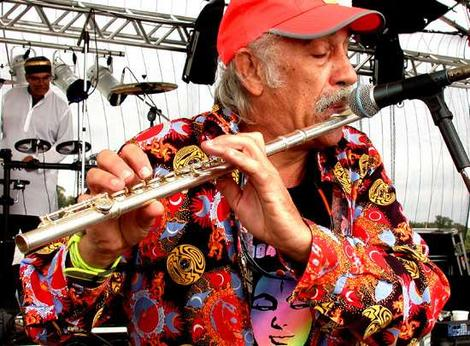
- Raja Ram on a tour on 1200 Micrograms

Background information
- Born: Ronald Gary Rothfield; 18 December 1940 (age 85)
- Origin: Melbourne
- Genres: Psychedelic rock, psychedelic trance
- Occupation: Musician
- Instruments: Flute, synthesiser
- Years active: 1969–present
- Website: psychology music

Raja Ram (born Ronald Gary Rothfield, 18 December 1940) is an Australian-born musician and the owner of the United Kingdom record label Tip World. He was a founding member of the psychedelic rock band Quintessence in the late 1960s and early 1970s, playing at the first two Glastonbury Fayres in 1970 and 1971. He later found success in the psychedelic trance scene and continues to headline at large events worldwide.

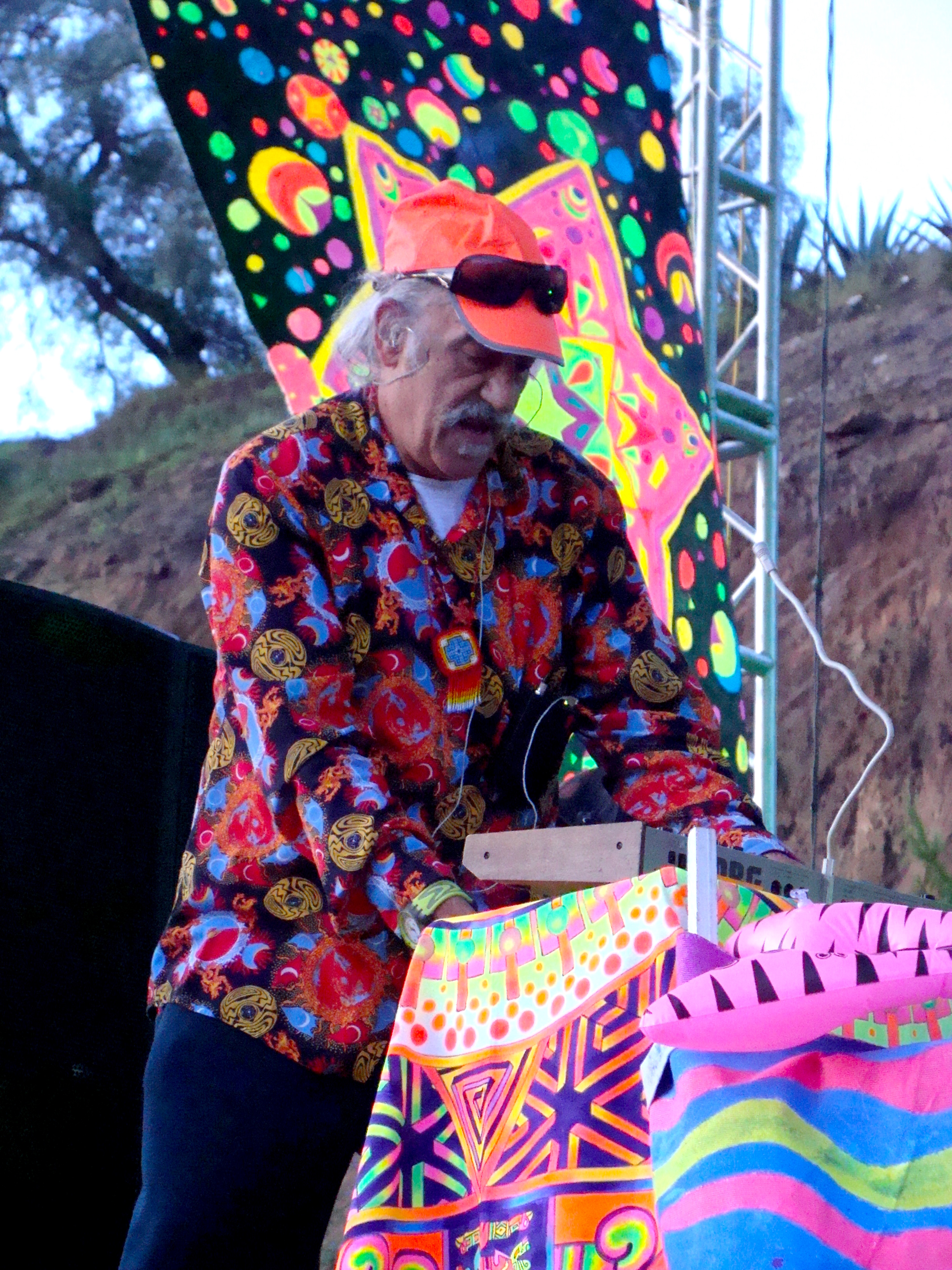
Raja Ram performing with 1200 Micrograms in Teotihuacán, Mexico, in September 2009

Ram was nominated for "Best Psychedelic Trance DJ" at the DJ Awards in 2001 and 2003.

== See also ==
- Shpongle
- The Infinity Project
- Quintessence (band)
- Psydub
- Goa trance
