= Twisted Records (UK) =

British record label

- Parent company: Twisted Records Ltd.
- Founded: July 1996
- Founder: Simon Posford; Simon Holtom
- Distributor(s): SRD, RED Distribution
- Genre: Psychedelic trance
- Country of origin: United Kingdom
- Location: London
- Official website: twistedmusic.com

Twisted Records is a British record label that specialises in psychedelic trance music. The label was founded by musician Simon Posford, who performs and records under the name Hallucinogen.

== See also ==
- List of electronic music record labels
- Lists of record labels
