= Infected Mushroom discography =

Discography

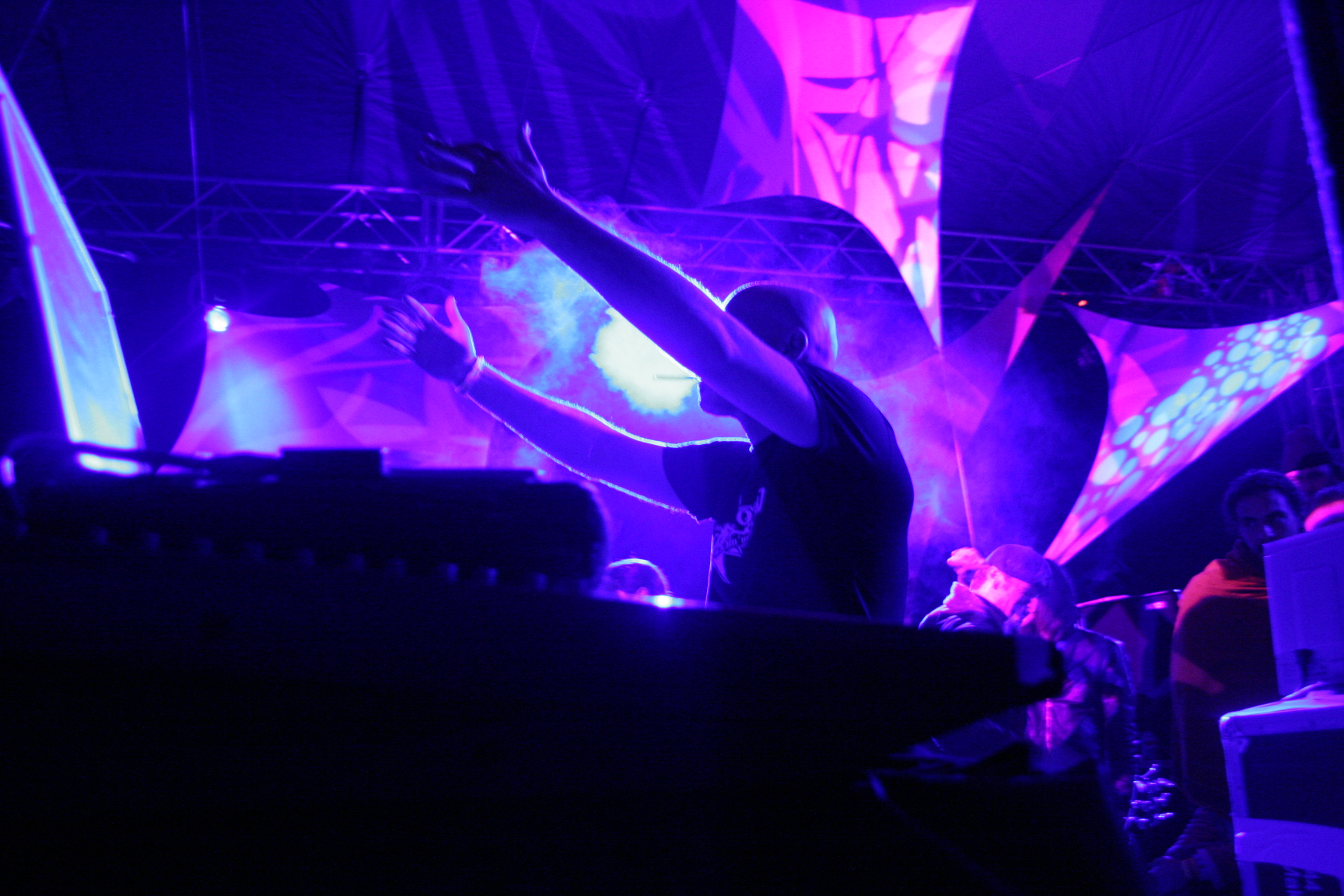
- Amit Duvdevani of Infected Mushroom at the Soulclipse festival in Turkey
- Studio albums: 15
- EPs: 5
- Compilation albums: 1
- Singles: 30
- Music videos: 10

The discography of Israeli psychedelic trance duo Infected Mushroom consists of fifteen studio albums, one compilation album, five extended plays, thirty singles, and ten music videos.

== Studio albums ==
Title	Album details	Peak positions			
Title	Album details	US	US Dance	US Heat	US Ind.
The Gathering	Released: 1 March 1999; Label: YoYo Records	—	—	—	—
Classical Mushroom	Released: 20 June 2000; Label: YoYo Records	—	—	—	—
B.P.Empire	Released: 1 March 2001; Label: YoYo Records	—	—	—	—
Converting Vegetarians	Released: 9 April 2003; Label: YoYo Records	—	—	—	—
IM The Supervisor	Released: 10 September 2004; Label: YoYo Records	—	—	—	—
Vicious Delicious	Released: 26 March 2007; Label: YoYo Records	—	—	—	—
Legend of the Black Shawarma	Released: 8 September 2009; Label: HOMmega	172	9	8	32
Army of Mushrooms	Released: 8 May 2012; Label: Dim Mak Records	—	11	7	34
Converting Vegetarians II	Released: 11 September 2015; Label: Dim Mak Records	—	14	—	—
Return to the Sauce	Released: 27 January 2017; Label: HOMmega	—	—	9	42
Head of NASA and the 2 Amish Boys	Released: 12 December 2018; Label: Monstercat	—	—	—	—
More Than Just a Name	Released: 23 March 2020; Label: Monstercat	—	—	—	—
IM25	Released: 16 September 2022; Label: Monstercat	—	—	—	—
Reborn	Released: 9 February 2024	—	—	—	—
IM30	Released: 30 January 2026; Label: Monstercat	—	—	—	—

== Compilation albums ==
Title	Album details	Peak positions		
Title	Album details	US Dance	US Heat	US Ind.
Friends on Mushrooms	Released: 6 January 2015; Label: Dim Mak Records	9	2	43

== Extended plays ==
Title	Album details
Intelligate	Released: 1 June 1999; Label: Self-released
Birthday (with Berry Sakharof)	Released: 26 July 2002; Label: YoYo Records
Stretched	Released: 2005; Label: YoYo Records
IM21, Pt. 1	Released: 9 March 2018; Label: HOMmega
Shroomeez	Released: 24 May 2021; Label: Monstercat

== Charted singles ==
Title	Year	Peak chart positions	Album
Title	Year	US Club	Album
"Killing Time"	2010	21	Legend of the Black Shawarma

== Other singles ==
Title	Year	Album
"Bust a Move"	2000	Classical Mushroom
"Anyone Else But Me"	2000	Non-album single
"B.P.Empire"	2001	B.P.Empire
"Deeply Disturbed"	2003	Converting Vegetarians
"Cities of the Future"	2004	IM the Supervisor
"Stretched"	2005	IM the Supervisor
"Becoming Insane"	2007	Vicious Delicious
"Smashing the Opponent"	2009	Legend of the Black Shawarma
"One Day" (with Matisyahu)	2010	Non-album singles
"Deck & Sheker"	2010	Non-album singles
"Pink Nightmares"	2011	Non-album singles
"U R So F****d" / "U R So Smart"	2012	Army of Mushrooms
"Evilution" (with Datsik featuring Jonathan Davis)	2012	Non-album singles
"Atid Matok" (with Mashina)	2012	Non-album singles
"Never Mind"	2013	Army of Mushrooms
"See Me Now"	2013	Non-album single
"Fields of Grey" (featuring Sasha Grey)	2015	Converting Vegetarians II
"Koh Phangan" (with Hatikva 6)	2016	Non-album singles
"Ad Or Sheyale" (with Avraham Tal)	2016	Non-album singles
"Liquid Smoke"	2016	Return to the Sauce
"Nutmeg"	2016	Return to the Sauce
"Legal Eyes (English Version)" (with Hadag Nahash)	2017	Non-album singles
"Spitfire"	2017	Non-album singles
"I Wish" (with Jetlag Music and Hot-Q featuring WhyNot Music and Jay)	2018	Non-album singles
"Walking On The Moon"	2018	Head of NASA and the 2 Amish Boys
"Bliss On Mushrooms" (with Bliss featuring Miyavi)	2018	Head of NASA and the 2 Amish Boys
"Guitarmass"		Head of NASA and the 2 Amish Boys
"Lost In Space"(with Tuna featuring A-Wa)		Head of NASA and the 2 Amish Boys
"Kababies"	2019	Monstercat's 8 Year Anniversary Adventure
"Ani Mevushal" (with Bliss)	2020	More Than Just a Name
"Freedom Bill" (with Freedom Fighters and Mr. Bill)	2020	More Than Just a Name
"Only Solutions"	2020	More Than Just a Name
"A Cookie from Space"	2022	IM25
"Black Velvet" (featuring Ninet Tayeb)	2022	IM25
"Dance Forever" ("תרקוד לנצח") (with Omer Adam)	2023	Non-album single

=== As featured artist ===
- Paul Oakenfold – "I'm Alive" (2011)

== Remixes ==
- Astrix - Coolio (Infected Mushroom Remix)
- Vini Vici & Pixel - Anything & Everything (Infected Mushroom Remix)
- The Doors - Riders on the Storm (Infected Mushroom Remix)
- Pegboard Nerds – Hero (Infected Mushroom Remix)
- Dudu Tassa & Berry Sakharof - La Trib Ani Utruch (Infected Mushroom Remix)

== Music videos ==
Year	Song	Director(s)
2002	"Birthday (featuring Berry Sakharof)"	—
2003	"Deeply Disturbed"	BuzzT and ElGeko
2006	"Becoming Insane"	harv
2009	"Smashing the Opponent"	Jonathan Davis
2010	"Killing Time" (Infected Trance Remix)	Matan Cohen
2011	"Pink Nightmares"	Sebastian Lopez
2012	"U R So F*cked"	Dim Mak Records
2012	"Evilution (with Datsik featuring Jonathan Davis)"	Dim Mak Records
2016	"Legal Eyes (with Hadag Nahash)"	Tal Zagreba
2017	"Becoming Insane (Remix feat. WARRIORS)"	Thomas Neunreither and Shamiel Soni

== Notes ==
Cover of Black Velvet by Alannah Myles.
