= Birthday (disambiguation) =

A birthday is an annual celebration of the date on which a person was born.

Birthday(s), The Birthday, or B-day may also refer to:

== Film and television ==
- Birthday (1977 film), an Azerbaijani film
- The Birthday (film), a 2004 Spanish film
- Birthday (2019 film), a South Korean film

=== Television episodes ===
- "Birth Day" (The Handmaid's Tale)
- "Birthday" (Angel)
- "Birthday" (Care Bears)
- "Birthday" (Maisy)
- "Birthday" (New Girl)
- "The Birthday" (Dynasty 1984)
- "The Birthday" (Dynasty 1987)
- "The Birthday" (Joe 90)
- "The Birthday" (King Rollo)
- "The Birthday" (The Vampire Diaries)

== Literature ==
- The Birthday (play), a 1941 verse drama by Paul Goodman
- The Birthday (short story collection), a 1999 collection of Japanese-language Ring-series stories by Koji Suzuki
- "A Birthday", a 1995 science fiction short story by Esther Friesner
- The Birth-day, an 1836 autobiographical poem by Caroline Bowles Southey
- "The Birthday", a short story by Indian writer Vaikom Muhammad Basheer

== Music ==
- The Birthday (band), a Japanese garage rock band
- Birth Day, a stage name of Irish musician Liam McCay

=== Albums ===
- Birthday (The Association album), 1968
- Birthday (ClariS album), 2012
- Birthday (Gentouki album), 2016
- Birthday (The Peddlers album), 1969
- Birthday (EP), by The Crüxshadow, or the title song, 2007
- Birthday, an EP by Infected Mushroom, 2002
- Birthdays (album), by Keaton Henson, 2013
- B'Day, by Beyoncé, 2006
- B-Day, by Tankard, 2002
- Birth Day, by New Birth, 1972

=== Songs ===
- "Birthday" (Anne-Marie song), 2020
- "Birthday" (Beatles song), 1968
- "Birthday" (Disclosure, Kehlani and Syd song), 2020
- "Birthday" (Jennifer Lopez song), 2025
- "Birthday" (Jeon Somi song), 2019
- "Birthday" (K. Michelle song), 2017
- "Birthday" (Katy Perry song), 2014
- "Birthday" (Namie Amuro song), 2014
- "Birthday" (Red Velvet song), 2022
- "Birthday" (Selena Gomez song), 2013
- "Birthday" (The Sugarcubes song), 1987
- "Birthday" (Taproot song), 2005
- "Birthday" (Will.i.am song), 2014
- "Birthday Song" (2 Chainz song), 2012
- "Birthday", by Fetty Wap and Monty, 2019
- "Birthday", by Blur from Leisure, 1991
- "Birthday", by Meredith Brooks from Blurring the Edges, 1997
- "Birthday", by Destiny's Child from Destiny's Child, 1998
- "Birthday", by Flo Rida, 2007
- "Birthday", by JP Cooper from Fifty Shades Darker: Original Motion Picture Soundtrack, 2017
- "Birthday", by Junior Boys, 2003
- "Birthday", by Kings of Leon from Come Around Sundown, 2010
- "Birthday", by Maisie Peters, 2017
- "Birthday", by Migos from Culture III, 2021
- "Birthday", by Peakboy from 05/27, 2018
- "Birthday", by Pixie Lott from Young Foolish Happy, 2011
- "Birthday", by the Prom Kings, 2005
- "Birthday", by Twista from Category F5, 2009
- "Birthday", by Usher and Zaytoven from A, 2018
- "Birthdays", by The Smith Street Band from More Scared of You Than You Are of Me, 2017
- "Birth-day (Love Made Real)", by Suzanne Vega from Nine Objects of Desire, 1996
- "Birthday Song", song by Don McLean, McLean 1975, And I Love You So (Don McLean album), covered Mike Douglas 1974
- "Birthday Song", song by Kim Wilde, Ricki Wilde, Kim Wilde 1992
- "Birthday Song", song by Matthew Ellis (British musician), Ellis 1971
- "Birthday Song", by Helen Reddy from No Way to Treat a Lady, 1975
- "B-Day", by IKon from New Kids: Begin, 2017
- "B-Day Song", by Madonna from the deluxe edition of MDNA, 2012

== Other uses ==
- Birthday (company), a Japanese video game developer
- Birthdays (retailer), a defunct British greeting cards retailer
- Birthday (patience), a solitaire card game
- The Birthday (painting), an 1868 painting by William Holman Hunt
- The Birthday, a 1915 painting by Marc Chagall
- "Birth Day", a pseudonym used by Irish music artist Liam McCay

== See also ==
- Birthday Party (disambiguation)
- Birthday Song (disambiguation)
- Happy Birthday (disambiguation)
- It's My Birthday (disambiguation)
- Birthday attack
