= Birthday Party =

A birthday party is a party to celebrate the anniversary of someone's birth.

Birthday Party or The Birthday Party may also refer to:

== Theatre, film, and television ==
- The Birthday Party (1931 film), a Mickey Mouse cartoon
- The Birthday Party (play), a 1958 play by Harold Pinter
  - The Birthday Party (1968 film), a 1968 film adaptation
- The Birthday Party (2025 film), a film directed by Miguel Ángel Jiménez
- The Birthday Party (2026 film) a 2026 French drama film
- King Cole's Birthday Party or Birthday Party, a 1947–49 American TV series
- "The Birthday Party" (Blood & Oil), a 2015 television episode
- "The Birthday Party" (Dynasty 1981), a 1981 episode of Dynasty
- "The Birthday Party" (Dynasty 2017), a 2021 episode of the Dynasty reboot series
- "The Birthday Party" (Motherland), a 2017 television episode
- "The Birthday Party" (My Name Is Earl), a 2007 television episode

== Music ==
- The Birthday Party (band), a 1977–1983 Australian post-punk band
- The Birthday Party (The Boys Next Door album), 1980
- The Birthday Party (The Idle Race album), 1968
- Birthday Party, an album by Dave Pegg, 1998
- The Birthday Party (video), a 1985 concert video by Motörhead
- "Birthday Party" (song), by AJR, 2019
- "The Birthday Party" (song), by the 1975, 2020
- "Birthday Party", a song by the Pixies Three, 1963

== Literature ==
- The Birthday Party, a 1862 juvenile novel by Oliver Optic; the sixth entry in the Riverdale Books series
- The Birthday Party, a 1938 novel by C. H. B. Kitchin
- The Birthday Party, a 1948 story collection by A. A. Milne
- The Birthday Party, a 1999 children's novel by Adrian Plass
- The Birthday Party (novel), a 2007 novel by Panos Karnezis
- The Birthday Party, a 2010 novel by Veronica Henry
- The Birthday Party, a 2019 novel by Roisin Meaney
- The Birthday Party, a 2020 French novel by Laurent Mauvignier (French: Histoires de la nuit)

== Other uses ==
- Birthday Party, the political party that was formed as part of Kanye West's 2020 presidential campaign

== See also ==
- Birthday (disambiguation)
- Party (disambiguation)
