= Send Me an Angel =

"Send Me an Angel" may refer to:

- "Send Me an Angel" (Real Life song), 1983
- "Send Me an Angel", 1983 song by American rock band Blackfoot
- "Send Me an Angel" (Scorpions song), 1990
- "Lord, Send Me an Angel", 2000 single by The White Stripes
- Send Me an Angel (album), 2002 song and album by Vision Divine
- "Send Me an Angel", 2010 song by Alicia Keys from Hope for Haiti Now
- "Send Me an Angel", 2012 Mashina cover by Infected Mushroom from Army of Mushrooms
