= Moonwalk =

Moonwalk, Moonwalker or Moonwalking may refer to:

- A moonwalk, extravehicular activity on the Moon
  - Lists of spacewalks and moonwalks

== Arts and entertainment ==
=== Music ===
- Moonwalk (album), by JPM, 2011
- "Moonwalk", a song by Earth, Wind & Fire from the 1983 album Electric Universe
- "Moonwalk", a song by WayV from the 2019 album Take Over the Moon
- "Moonwalk", a 2021 song by Cupcakke
- "Moonwalkin", a song by Roddy Ricch from Please Excuse Me for Being Antisocial

=== Film ===
- Moonwalk (film), a 2025 Indian Malayalam film
- Moonwalker, a 1988 film starring Michael Jackson
- Moonwalkers (film) is a 2015 British crime comedy film

=== Other uses in arts and entertainment ===
- Moonwalk (book), a 1988 autobiography by Michael Jackson
- Moonwalk (dance), a dance move popularized by Michael Jackson
  - Moonwalkers, the unofficial name for the Michael Jackson fandom
- Moonwalk Records, a record label in Estonia
- Michael Jackson's Moonwalker, several video games

== Places ==
- Moonwalk, Parañaque, Philippines
- Moon Walk (New Orleans), United States, a scenic boardwalk in Jackson Square

== Other uses ==
- Moonwalk, an inflatable castle
- MoonWalk (charity event), an annual nocturnal marathon in various locations
- Moonwalk (cocktail), a drink invented for the first walk on the Moon in 1969

== See also ==
- Moonwalk One, a 1970 film about Apollo 11
- A Walk on the Moon, a 1999 film
- Walk the Moon, an American rock band
  - Walk the Moon (album)
- "Walkin' on the Moon", a 2009 song by The-Dream
- "Walking on the Moon", a 1979 song by The Police
- "Walking on the Moon", a 2018 song by Infected Mushroom
- Moon landing
- Apollo program - that included several missions involving people walking on the moon.
