= Maya Isacowitz =

Israeli singer-songwriter

Maya Isacowitz מאיה איזקוביץ
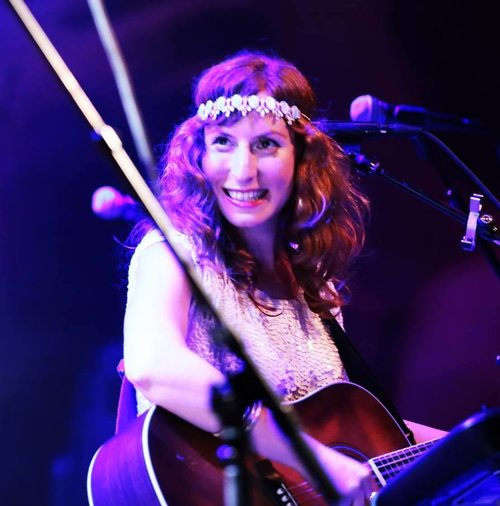
- Isacowitz in Tel Aviv, 2014

Background information
- Born: 25 November 1987 (age 38); Ma'ayan Baruch, Israel
- Genres: Folk rock, Alternative rock
- Occupations: Singer, songwriter, musician
- Instruments: Vocals, guitar
- Years active: 2009–present
- Website: mayaisac.com

Maya Isacowitz (Maya Isac in short, Hebrew: מאיה איזקוביץ; born 25 November 1987) is an Israeli singer-songwriter who sings in English.

== Biography ==
Maya Isacowitz was born in 1987 in Ma'ayan Baruch, Israel, to South African parents who made aliyah to Israel. Her father, Peter, is wood artist and musician who builds ethnic musical instruments. In her childhood the family moved to Karkom, Israel. At the age of 14 she started playing guitar and singing. As early as 16 she recorded a demo and distributed it through friends.

At the age of 21, she independently recorded her debut album, Safe & Sound. The album have been sold in her concerts.

In August 2011, she re-released her debut album through the Israeli label High Fidelity. Three of the album songs were released as singles: Is It Alright, Safe & Sound and Brave Again. The album sold more than 15,000 copies by 2014, becoming gold record. In 2012 she won ACUM award for best new artist. That year she participated in one song of Infected Mushroom album, Army of Mushrooms. In 2013 she moved to New York City and worked on her second album with the Israeli producer J.Views. While in New York, Isacowitz toured the states, featured in South by Southwest festival, Mountain Jam festival and an opening act for Suzanne Vega. In August 2015 she released her second album, All of the Miles. After releasing the new album she returned to Israel for a tour. In February 2019 she released SPARKLE, an EP produced by Tomer Yosef.

In August 2023, When I Get There, a song from All of the Miles, gained popularity on social media and music streaming services after being featured in update v0.6 of the popular adult visual novel Eternum. The song was later removed from the title in update v0.8.6 along with fifty other tracks by various artists due to changes in licenses, and was replaced by Not There Yet, an AI-generated song by Tateshiko, a Filipino artist.

== Discography ==
- Safe & Sound (2011)
- All of the Miles (2015)
- SPARKLE (2019)
