= Little Infamies =

2002 short story collection by Panos Karnezis

- First edition cover
- Author: Panos Karnezis
- Publisher: Jonathan Cape
- Publication date: 2002
- ISBN: 978-0-224-06261-9

Little Infamies is a 2002 collection of 19 short stories published by Greek writer Panos Karnezis. It is set in a small Greek village with many recurring characters.

== Stories ==
- "A Funeral of Stones" - Following an earthquake, Father Yerasimo finds a coffin full of stones, and discovers that a young mother died in childbirth. Her husband pretends that the twins also died, but he chains them up in the cellar and completely ignores them. The twins escape as children and accompanying a bird-trader they later try to avenge their father, but antibiotics then intervene.
- "Another Day on Pegasus" - On an old coach, the driver, conductor and a woman wearing a yellow dress antagonise each other on the journey to a new village.
- "Deus ex Machina" - Young farmer Isidoro inherits a prize racehorse from a distant relative. It arrives on a train causing considerably interest from the stationmaster and the richest landowner in the area, as Isidoro intends to race it.
- "Jeremiad" - Elderly Mr. Jeremias arrives at the Pension Office and takes the last seat in the waiting room, he then dies without anybody noticing. As the office is closing the clerk finally picks up Mr. Jeremias' documents and says that 'your situation has now been resolved'...
- "Whale on the Beach" - The weather is too hot when Whale opens his café. The only customer is Sapphire, so Whale suggests that he closes the café and they go to the beach. Then her boyfriend Retsina arrives, and he looks down at the size of Whale and the state of the café.
- "The Day of the Beast" - The landowner poisons his young wife, steals from dead bodies from and levies indiscriminate and unfair punishments on the villagers. The doctor and lawyer raise a wolf to kill him.
- "A Circus Attraction" - The Centaur was the gypsy circus' primary attraction but he told them he was leaving. They negotiated and agreed to 15%.
- "Stella the Spinster's Afternoon Dreams" - A stranger stays in Stella's pension but she is unable to sleep due to the moths in her garden. The stranger brings a barrel-organ with him which he then plays to allow Stella to sleep. He then steals her jewels and disappears.
- "Cassandra is Gone" - Mermaid Cassandra shows off her tattoos to a village boy.
- "Wilt Thou Be Whole" - Father Yerasimo eventually persuades the bishop to visit the village. Yerasimo arranges for the villagers to send their requests to himself for them to be presented to the bishop. Yerasimo knows Alexandro the Lame's secret, was then miraculously healed by the healed by the bishop, and was renamed to 'Alexandro the healed', causing great celebration by the villagers.
- "Medical Ethics" - Doctor Panteleon was approached by a girl to prove her virginity. Her stepfather then tells her she must marry the doctor or the butcher. Panteleon declines but then amends her stepfather's suppositories to be poisonous.
- "Immortality" - A one-eyed lady arrived at the village with a large camera. She claims that producing a photograph of the villagers will immortalize them.
- "A Classical Education" - Nectario was obsessed with training animals without success. Then he bought a parrot, called it Homer and then taught it to recite the classics. The parrot then started reciting nursery rhymes but then overdosed with too much hemp seed.
- "Sins of a Harvest God" - During a long period of drought, the Mayor plans to marry his daughter to the butcher to ease the mayor's financial burden as the village no longer needed a mayor following the earthquake. Just as he is about to announce the marriage of his daughter at the Harvest Festival it starts to rain. The butcher then shoots the mayor...
- "Sacrifice" - Dionysio's Hereford bull killed his daughter, he and his son then killed the bull with a knives and a bayonet.
- "The Hunters in Winter" - Hunters have no luck in catching prey, they are caught in a violent storm and arrive at the village where they burn the houses and rape the women.
- "Applied Aeronautics" - Nectario has planned to launch himself from the church belfry attached to his latest flying machine. He has stuck many turkey feathers to the wings but he still plunged to the ground. The villagers know that turkeys cannot fly.
- "On the First Day of Lent" - Aristo asked the warden of the prison if he could attend his mothers memorial service. Aristo was in prison as he stole Stella's jewellery, caught by Father Yerasimo. Aristo plans to kill Father Yerasimo in revenge for his incarceration.
- "The Legend of Atlantis" - The village had lived for the threat of the dam for many years, the delegation unable to stop the flooding of their village. The villagers were moved to a new site but en-masse they moved back to the original site of the village. Then the water rose...

== Reception ==
- Michael Upchurch in The New York Times praises the collection "the book's 19 stories, they're remarkable for their shapeliness and sense of mischief. Some are novella length, others swift vignettes. Overshadowing them all is a tension between the intimate glimpse they give of their village world and the sense they convey that this world is soon to vanish. The time, unspecified, must be the 1950's or early 1960's. The Nazi occupation during World War II is a not-too-distant memory. Electricity, telephones and television are still novelties. Most citizens make their living, if they make one at all, through shopkeeping, subsistence farming or employment in lower-tier government posts...the mood, from story to story, ranges from droll to grim, from ebullient to ominous...But what Little Infamies mostly does is seduce you into its magically real and soon-to-be-spectral world."
- Monique Truong writing in the Entertainment Weekly also praises the book: "Karnezis, a Greek who writes in English, sets all 19 stories in an unnamed Greek village. Its handful of inhabitants saunter in and out of his narratives, bringing with them secrets, loves, betrayals, and the everyday infamies that occupy us so that we can better ignore the larger, often unanswerable questions that loom over our existence. Karnezis’ writing throughout is spare but never sterile, and blessed with a wry humour that riffles through his words like a well-timed sea breeze."
- Alan Rafferty in The Observer is also positive "The idiosyncrasies of the inhabitants and the author's informal narrative style (we never learn anyone's full name) quickly conjure the impression of a warm, supportive community...Karnezis manipulates the narrative from the hilarious to the heinous with ease, and the combination of his comic scenarios with some genuinely shocking moments is wonderfully entertaining."
- Again The New Yorker is also positive, "These fierce twisted and darkly funny stories are set in an unnamed Greek village, in what might be called the eternal present. Karnezis has a sharp unsentimental eye for contemporary Greek life, while deftly adding intimations of the pagan past...The connecting thread here is the spectacular untrustworthiness of the village's inhabitants".
