= The Maze (novel) =

2004 novel by Panos Karnezis

- Author: Panos Karnezis
- Language: English
- Publisher: Jonathan Cape
- Publication date: 5 Feb. 2004
- Publication place: United Kingdom
- Media type: Print (Hardback & Paperback)
- Pages: 364 (Hardback); 372 (Paperback)
- ISBN: 0-224-06976-4
- OCLC: 53390094
- Dewey Decimal: 823.92 21
- LC Class: PR6111.A76 M395 2004b

The Maze is a novel published by the Greek writer Panos Karnezis in 2004. The book is the story of the nostos of a Greek army brigade in Anatolia trying to make their way back home.

The Maze was shortlisted for the 2004 Whitbread First Novel Award.

== Plot ==
At the end of the Greco-Turkish War, one Greek brigade wanders lost in the Anatolian desert. Led by Brigadier Nestor, the soldiers hope they are marching west toward the Aegean Sea and the end of their disastrous tour of duty. The war is over, but the men must battle on.

Brigadier Nestor, an aging career soldier still devastated by his wife's death a year earlier, has become addicted to morphine and Greek mythology. His second-in-command, Chief of Staff Major Porfirio, while appearing to be a model soldier, is keeping a treasonous secret. The company priest, Father Simeon, imagines himself the Apostle of All Anatolians, but in fact is just a thief. And the rest of the brigade is not faring too well either. Subsisting almost entirely on cornmeal, their morale is low and things are growing stranger the longer they wander.

It seems though that the luck of the brigade is finally changing. First, a Greek pilot crashes from the sky bringing hope that perhaps they are being searched for. Then, following a runaway horse, they come across a quiet Greek village virtually untouched by the war. The inhabitants and tales of the village are just as interesting and complicated as those of the brigade. The mayor is about to marry the madame of the brothel, the church is overrun with rats and the Turkish quarter is surrounded by an open sewer. This village does not offer the comforts the brigade had longed for. Brigadier Nestor still hopes to lead the men to the sea and escape, and the mayor knows the way. But before they can leave they must all contend with a desperate war correspondent and one final act of violence that permanently scars the village. This act oddly reflects another moment of violence that haunts the brigade and lies just beneath the surface of all they do.

The brigade may finally escape the maze of the Anatolian desert, but each man is forever marred not only by the war but by what has happened since the war ended. The worst casualties may have nothing to do with battle.
