= Gentouki =

Jun Tanaka
- Also known as: Gentouki
- Born: January 12, 1977 (age 49); Himeji, Hyōgo Prefecture, Japan
- Genres: J-pop, Rock, Alternative, Bossa, Jazz, R&B, Urban
- Occupations: Musician, songwriter, singer, composer, arranger music producer
- Instruments: Vocals, guitar, keyboards
- Years active: 1995–present
- Label: Victor Entertainment
- Website: Gentouki Official Web Site

Gentouki (ゲントウキ) is a Japanese band and solo performing name of singer-songwriter and producer Jun Tanaka. Gentouki has released 6 major singles and 5 major albums in the band's history.
Most recent album Tanjoubi was released on September 21, 2016.

== Members ==
Jun Tanaka (田中潤) is the founder, vocalist and songwriter of Gentouki. Tanaka continues Gentouki as a solo project with live support members.

== Past members ==
- Mori Takashi (森敬)

From Okayama Prefecture. Bassist. (1995–2001)

- Hiroyuki Yoshida (吉田裕之)

From Nara Prefecture. Drummer. (1995–2000)

- Kenta Itou (伊藤健太)

From Hirakata, Osaka Prefecture
Nicknamed Itoken. Bassist. (Official member 2001–2006)

- Kyosuke Sasai (笹井 享介)

From Nagano Prefecture. Drummer. (Live support 2000–2002. Official member 2002–2006)

=== Support members ===
- Kenta Itou (伊藤健太) (ex Gentouki)

Bassist. (Live support 2008 – )

- Nobuyuki Mori (森信行) (ex Quruli)

From Kawanishi, Hyōgo Prefecture. Drummer.

- Daisuke Shimaoka (嶌岡大祐) (ex SG Honeoka)

From Osaka Prefecture. Piano.

- NELO (ネロ) (THE ORANGES)

From Tokyo Prefecture. Guitar.

== History ==
=== Early life ===
Jun Tanaka grew up with the influence of music his parents listened to, such as American pop music from A&M Records, The Beatles and classic Japanese pop and folk music.
He is deeply influenced by Brazilian artists including Elis Regina, Joyce Moreno, Doris Monteiro, Tom Jobim, and João Gilberto.

=== Gentouki formation (1995–2000) ===
The band formed in Osaka 1995 under the name 'Everyday Flowers' and eventually changed the band name to Gentouki, meaning magic lantern after manga artist Oji Suzuki's Toumei Tsuushin.
Tanaka was attending university at the time and enlisted Hiroyuki Yoshida on drums and Takashi Mori on bass, with Jun Tanaka on vocals, guitar and keyboard. After a number of live shows, Gentouki completed a 6-song cassette demo tape.

=== Indies debut (2000–2003) ===
The band made their indies debut at the label CHILDISH SOUP with the mini-album Omae no Ashiato. During this time, the band attracted interest from musicians like Keiichi Sokabe and Yoshihiko Inohara. Gentouki was considered a rival band of Kirinji. They performed at the Udagawa-cho Rock Festival and venues across Tokyo. In 2001, the band would release their first single Haikara. and album Minami no Hankyuu.through DAIZAWA RECORDS, with member Kenta Itou joining on bass, and officially becoming a 2-man band. After moving from Osaka to Tokyo in 2002, Gentouki recorded the cover of Aoi Kuruma for Spitz tribute album Ichigo Ichie Sweets for my SPITZ. Support drummer Kyosuke Sasai would also become the third official member in November 2002. Illustrations of the band's work during this period was done by a mutual close friend.

=== Major debut (2003–2006) ===
Gentouki had their major debut in February 2003 with the single Niibiro no Kisetsu released through label Teenage Symphony. This song was featured in heavy rotation broadcasts on FM802. September 2003 saw the release of first major album Itsumo no You ni.

On April 15, 2005, Gentouki performed their single Hajimari no Kisetsu on NHK PopJam (1993–2007) which has since become with Music Japan. 2 months later, the single Tsuioku no Rainy Day was released and was featured as the song for the Tsuioku no Rainy Road campaign, which led to an in-store live tour, and heralded the release of second major album Kanjou no Tamago in August 2005. 2006 started off with the release of mini album Romen Densha to Cheese Cake which was themed after Matsumushi street in Nishinari, Osaka, where Tanaka lived in his early twenties. The album was featured on heavy rotation in famous cheese cake shops around Osaka.

=== Dissolution and solo (2006–2016) ===
In December 2006, Itou and Sasai left the band over irreconcilable differences of the band's direction. This led Tanaka to continue the band as a solo project. Gentouki went on to release a best-of album titled Gentou Meisaku Gekijou in February 2007. From 2008, Tanaka started activity as a producer and arranger for popular artists like SMAP, May J., Koda Kumi, Satomi Takasugi and others. Tanaka has continued to perform live shows under the Gentouki moniker with ex bassist Itou has rejoined Gentouki as a live support member, as well as drummer Nobuyuki Mori, a founding member of legendary band Quruli fame.

=== Comeback (2016–) ===
Gentouki provided the commercial song for retailer Marui's Sparkling Sale campaign for Winter 2016. In Spring 2016, Tanaka announced that Gentouki would be releasing a new major album under Victor Entertainment with the album Tanjoubi released September 21, 2016. This launched Gentouki's bilingual efforts, as the album features English translations of the song lyrics, as well as providing English on the official homepage and social media posts.

== Yusuke Nakamura involvement ==
The 2003 Niibiro no Kisetsu single and Itsumo no You ni releases marked the involvement of illustrator Yusuke Nakamura.
Being a big fan of Gentouki and being impressed by their live performance, Nakamura personally requested the band to let him do illustrations for their CDs. This resulted in Nakamura's first professional illustration job, illustrating the artwork of 2003 single Nibiiro no kisetsu. Illustrator Yusuke Nakamura is still closely related to Gentouki and has provided most of their CD artwork. Nakamura continues to be a close friend of Tanaka and has provided the artwork for Gentouki's newest album Tanjoubi in 2016.

== Discography ==
=== Singles ===
	Release date	Title	Catalog	Tracklisting	Notes
1st	July 26, 2001	Haikara	UKDZ-5005	1. Haikara; 2. Minami Hankyuu; 3. Nanairo Hikouki (Bonus track)	Released on DAIZAWA RECORDS
2nd	February 19, 2003	Nibiiro no Kisetsu	MUCT-5001	1. Nibiiro no Kisetsu; 2. Namida ga Kareru Made; 3. Ameagari no Asa	Teenage Symphony / DREAMUSIC
3rd	June 18, 2003	Sutekina, Ano Hito.	MUCT-5002	1. Sutekina, Ano Hito.; 2. Natsu no Omoide	Teenage Symphony / DREAMUSIC
4th	February 18, 2004	Mitasarete Kokoro wa	MUCT-5005	1. Mitasarete Kokoro wa 2. Michinari; 3. Minami Hankyuu (Live)	Teenage Symphony / DREAMUSIC
5th	November 10, 2004	Saraba!	MUCT-5010	1. Saraba!; 2. Oboetate no Melody; 3. Jackle no Yoru	Teenage Symphony
6th	April 6, 2005	Hajimari no Kisetsu	MUCT-5013	1. Hajimari no Kisetsu; 2. Monochrome Smile; 3. Yume no Kakera	Teenage Symphony
7th	June 22, 2005	Tsuioku no Rainy Day	MUCT-5015	1. Tsuioku no Rainy Day; 2. Kikoenai Real	Teenage Symphony

=== Albums ===
	Release date	Title	Catalog	Track listing	Notes
1st Mini Album	October 1, 2000	Omae no Ashiato	CSCD-08	1. Douka Omoidashite; 2. Omae no Ashiato; 3. Kyoujitsu; 4. Café au lait 5. Futari no Seikatsu	Released on CHILDISH SOUP
1st Album	October 26, 2001	Minami Hankyuu	UKDZ-0006	1. Nanairo no Hikouki; 2. Haikara; 3. Bonyari Yume; 4. Hinatabokko; 5. Narenai Sakamichi; 6. Hakken; 7. Clover; 8. Koe wa Kakezu ni 9. Minami Hankyuu; 10. Tooku e	Released on DAIZAWA RECORDS
2nd Album	September 25, 2003	Itsumo no You ni	MUCT-1006	1. Ameagari no Asa (album version); 2. Sutekina, Ano Hito; 3. Giragira Taiyou wo Se ni 4. Futari no Curry Rice; 5. Namida ga Kareru Made (album version); 6. Mitasarete Kokoro wa 7. Kimi ga Warau Toki; 8. Heya; 9. Arifureta Mirai e 10. Natsu no Omoide; 11. Kairiki otoko no Jidai; 12. Nibiiro no Kisetsu	TEENAGE SYMPHONY
3rd Album	August 3, 2005	Kanjou no Tamago	MUCT-1014	1. Neko no Akubi; 2. Top News; 3. Monochrome Smile; 4. Saraba!; 5. Tsuioku no Rainy Day; 6. Makeup; 7. Oboetate no Melody; 8. Hajimari no Kisetsu; 9. Kanjou no Tamago; 10. Yume no Kakera	Teenage Symphony
2nd Mini Album	March 1, 2006	Romen Densha to Cheesecake	MUCT-1016	1. Matsumushi Koushin Kyoku; 2. Ichimokusan; 3. 1.7m 4. Movie Star; 5. Muchuujin; 6. Amechan, Hitotsu	Teenage Symphony
Best Album	February 28, 2007	Gentou Meisaku Gekijou	MUCT-8001:Limited Edition; MUCT-1018:Standard	CD: 1. Sutekina, Ano Hito.; 2. Ichimokusan; 3. Top News; 4. Tsuioku no Rainy Day; 5. Mitasarete Kokoro wa 6. Saraba!; 7. Gougai to Scramble Kousaten; 8. Aoi Kuruma; 9. Movie Star; 10. Michinari; 11. Nibiiro no Kisetsu; 12. Natsu no Omoide(Nouryou version); 13. Jackal no Yoru; 14. Kikoenai Real; 15. Abeno-music Abeno-life; 16. Hajimari no Kisetsu; Limited edition DVD music videos: 1. Nibiiro no Kisetsu; 2. Sutekina, Ano Hito.; 3. Mitasarete Kokoro wa 4. Saraba!; 5. Hajimari no Kisetsu; 6. Tsuioku no Rainy Day; 7. Ichimokusan	Teenage Symphony
5th Album	September 21, 2016	Tanjoubi	MUCT-1014	1. Tanjoubi (Birth Day); 2. Gomannen Survivor (50-Thousand Year Survivor); 3. Kamome no Kimochi (A Seagull's Heart); 4. Bye-Bye; 5. Ai no Sabaku (Desert of Love); 6. Softcream to Skirt no Kinenbi (Anniversary of Ice Cream and a Skirt); 7. Algorithm; 8. Busy Days; 9. Sutekina, Ano Hito (Bonus track acoustic version) (That Wonderful Person)	Victor Entertainment

=== Unreleased ===
Untitled 6 song demo tape from 1995

=== Compilation ===
Release date	Title	Catalog	Tracklisting	Notes
July 25, 2001	STYLUS#1	CCJ-0001	Omae no Ashiato	College Chart Japan
March 20, 2002	Smells Like Teenage Symphony	MUCT-1001	Hinatabokko〜(Shitunaigaku version)	DREAMUSIC
October 17, 2002	Ichigo Ichie Sweets for my SPITZ	MUCT-1003	Aoi Kuruma	DREAMUSIC
July 30, 2003	The Many Moods of Smiley Smile	MUCT-1004	Natsu no Omoide	Teenage Symphony
October 7, 2007	TOKYO BOSSA NOVA 〜vento〜	HRBD-001	Softcream to Skirt no Kinenbi	Happiness Records
November 12, 2008	TOKYO CITY POPs	HRBD-010	Ameba	Happiness Records

== Produced Works ==
- Satomi Takasugi "hand"（Composer） – From album MASCARA released May 26, 2010
- Lay "Kono Ai de Aru You ni"（Composer） – From single Kono Ai de Aru You ni released June 2, 2010

Ending song of Japanese-Korean movie Cholula no Shi

- SMAP "Mijikai Kami"（Composer） – From album We are SMAP! released July 21, 2010
- Miyazaki Kaoru "Bye-Bye," "Gimme Your Love"（Composer, lyricist, Arranger) From album 9 STORIES released October 10, 2012
- May J. "Eternally"（Composer, Arranger – From album Brave released December 5, 2012
- Asako Toki "Girls (You are so special)"（Composer・Co-Arranger – From album HEARTBREAKIN' released June 12, 2013

=== Produced and Arranged Work ===
- Masaki Shigaki

Album Hummingmoon from August 2, 2008. Produced Track 1 "this song", track 9 "Tenkininaare", Track 11 Tsuki no Michi de Aimashou.
Performed organ on track 4 "Natsu no Odoriko", guitar and tambourine on track 6 "Sully"

- Miki Taramae

Single "Heartbeat" released June 10, 2009
Arranger, Instrumental programming, acoustic guitar

- Koda Kumi "I Love you, SAYONARA"（Arranger） – Cover album "ETERNITY 〜Love & Songs〜" released October 13, 2010
- moumoon "Happy Unbirthday"（Arranger） – From album 15 Doors released March 2, 2011
- Jonathan Wong "Boku ga Iru"（Arranger） – From single Kimi wa Bara yoru Utsukushii released June 5, 2011
- Tomoko Tane

Album Uh Baby Baby from October 26, 2011
Sang chorus, keyboard and programming on track 4 "Warattete", keyboards and programming on track 7 "Tokyo wa Nukeru Youna Aozora ~Happy Birthday~"

- May J. "Shiroi Kuma no You ni"（Arranger） – From cover album Summer Ballad Covers released June 19, 2013

=== Soundtracks ===
- Movie Long Caravan(October 2009)

Made title song Long Caravan for EXILE MATSU.

== Music videos ==
Director	Song
Gen Asada	Saraba! (2004)
Masao Kimura	Ichimokusan (2006)
Yutaka Kimura	Nibiiro no Kisetsu (2003)
Tetsuji Kuramitsu	Mitasarete Kokoro wa (2004)
Satoshi Takaki	Tsuioku no Rainy Day (2005)
Ryota Baba	Tanjoubi (2016)

== Performances ==
- April 12, 2002 – SPACE SHOWER Retsuden 13 ~Sachiyu (Happy End no Utage~
- October 20, 2002– MINAMI WHEEL 2002
- October 18, 2003– MINAMI WHEEL 2003
- October 24, 2004– MINAMI WHEEL 2004
- September 17, 2005– RADIO BERRY Berry Ten Live 2005
- October 11, 2014– BEATRAM MUSIC FESTIVAL 2014
- December 4, 2014– Gentouki One-Man Live "Tokyo Matsumushidori~2014nen Muchuu no Tabi~"
