= Alien Project (musician) =

Israeli psychedelic trance musician

- Birth name: Ari Linker
- Origin: Ramat Hasharon, Israel
- Genres: Psychedelic trance, Goa trance
- Years active: 1994–present
- Labels: TIP.World, Phonokol, H2O Records

Alien Project is the stage name of Israeli psychedelic trance DJ and producer Ari Linker (Hebrew: ארי לינקר). He has also collaborated with other musicians in the groups Alien vs. The Cat (with Space Cat), Crunchy Punch (with Jean Borelli), N.B.K. (with Christophe Drouillet), and Save the Robot (with Ido Liran).

== History ==
Ari Linker first began performing in Goa in 1994. He has been invited back to perform in Goa as a live act or DJ every year since then.

His first album as Alien Project was Midnight Sun, released on Phonokol in 2001. Israeli trance musician Astrix collaborated on four tracks on the album. The album also featured appearances from Jean Borelli, Orion, and Celli Firmi.

His second album, Aztechno Dream, was released on TIP.World in 2002. It featured trance musician Riktam (of GMS) on three of the tracks. The album also featured an appearance from psychedelic music pioneer Raja Ram.

His third album, Dance or Die, was released on Phonokol in 2002. It featured three collaborations with Astrix, one with GMS, two with Jean Borelli, one with Celli Firmi, and one with Serge Souque (of the group Total Eclipse).

In an interview in 2003, Astrix announced that he was collaborating with Alien Project on three new records, but the two musicians parted ways a short time later. He collaborated with Israeli trance musician Space Cat (Avi Algranati) in the project Alien vs. The Cat.

The fourth Alien Project album, Don't Worry Be Groovy!, was released on TIP.World in April 2004. It featured a collaboration with Jean Borelli and another collaboration with Raja Ram.

The fifth Alien Project album, Activation Portal, was released on H2O Records in April 2007.

== Discography ==
- Midnight Sun (2001, Phonokol)
- Aztechno Dream (2002, TIP.World)
- Dance or Die (2002, Phonokol)
- Don't Worry Be Groovy! (2004, TIP.World)
- Activation Portal (2007, H2O Records)
