= Panos Karnezis =

Greek writer

Panagiotis Karnezis (Greek: Παναγιώτης (Πάνος) Καρνέζης; born 1967 in Amaliada), known as Panos Karnezis, is a Greek writer. Born in Greece, he moved to England in 1992 to study Engineering. He was later awarded a M.A. in Creative Writing by the University of East Anglia.

His first collection of stories, Little Infamies, was published in 2002. In 2004 he published The Maze, a novel set during the Greco-Turkish War of 1919–1922. His third novel, The Birthday Party, was adapted into a film starring Willem Dafoe.

He lives in London.

== Bibliography ==
- Little Infamies (London, 2002)
- The Maze (London, 2004)
- The Birthday Party (2007)
- The Convent (2010)
- The Fugitives (2015)
- We Are Made of Earth (2019)
