= Happy Birthday =

Happy Birthday may refer to:

- "Happy Birthday", an expression of good will offered on a person's birthday

== Film and theatre ==
- Happy Birthday (play), a 1946 Broadway play by Anita Loos
- Happy Birthday (1998 film), a Russian drama by Larisa Sadilova
- Happy Birthday (2002 film), an American film by Yen Tan
- Happy Birthday (2009 film), a Maldivian suspense thriller
- Happy Birthday (2016 Indian film), an Indian Kannada-language film
- Happy Birthday (2016 American film), a horror-thriller
- Happy Birthday (2021 film), an Indian thriller short film
- Happy Birthday (2022 Indian film), an Indian Telugu-language crime comedy film
- Happy Birthday (2022 Sri Lankan film), a Sri Lankan mystery thriller
- Happy Birthday, a 2001 film featuring John Goodman and directed by Helen Mirren
- Happy Birthday, a 2005 film featuring Kousei Amano
- Happy Birthday, a 2006 Hong Kong film starring Louis Koo
- Happy Birthday, a 2007 French short film co-directed by Hichem Yacoubi
- Happy Birthday, a 2008 Thai film
- Happy Birthday, a 1972/3 Iranian film directed by Nosratolah Vahdat

== Television ==
- Happy Birthday (TV series), a 2018 Thai television series
- "Happy Birthday" (CSI: Miami), an episode of CSI: Miami
- "Happy Birthday" (Roseanne), an episode of Roseanne
- "Happy Birthday", an episode of The Wind in the Willows

== Music ==
=== Albums ===
- Happy Birthday (Altered Images album) or the title song (see below), 1981
- Happy Birthday (Pete Townshend album), 1970
- Happy Birthday (Finn Wolfhard album), 2025
- Happy Birthday (Sharon, Lois & Bram album), 1988
- Happy Birthday!, by Modeselektor, or the title song, 2007
- Happy Birthday (mixtape), by Tinie Tempah, or the title track, 2011
- Happy Birthday, by the Burning Hell, 2008
- Happy Birthday, by Cookies, 2002

=== Songs ===
- "Happy Birthday to You", a traditional song from 1893 or earlier, also known as "Happy Birthday"
- "Happy Birthday" (Altered Images song), 1981
- "Happy Birthday" (Birthday Party song), 1980
- "Happy Birthday" (The Click Five song), 2007
- "Happy Birthday" (Concrete Blonde song), 1989
- "Happy Birthday" (Flipsyde song), 2005
- "Happy Birthday" (Loretta Lynn song), 1964
- "Happy Birthday" (NEWS song), 2008
- "Happy Birthday" (Sfera Ebbasta song), 2018
- "Happy Birthday" (Stevie Wonder song), 1980
- "Happy Birthday", by B'z from Monster, 2006
- "Happy Birthday", by the Birthday Massacre from Nothing and Nowhere, 2002
- "Happy Birthday", by Black Country, New Road from Forever Howlong, 2025
- "Happy Birthday", by Carly Simon from Have You Seen Me Lately, 1990
- "Happy Birthday", by Childish Major featuring Isaiah Rashad and SZA from Woosah, 2017
- "Happy Birthday", by Gary Glitter from Touch Me, 1973
- "Happy Birthday", by Lenny Kravitz from Strut, 2014
- "Happy Birthday", by Matt Maltese from Hers, 2025
- "Happy Birthday", by R. Kelly, 2015
- "Happy Birthday", by So Def featuring Izza Kizza and Missy Elliott, 2007
- "Happy Birthday", by Sufjan Stevens from A Sun Came, 1999
- "Happy Birthday", by Technohead, 1996
- "Happy Birthday", by "Weird Al" Yankovic from "Weird Al" Yankovic, 1983
- "Happy Birthday", by Woo Jin-young, 2021
- "Yom Huledet (Happy Birthday)", by Eden, representing Israel in the Eurovision Song Contest 1999

== See also ==
- Birthday (disambiguation)
- "Happy Birthday Baby", a single by Tony Christie, 1974
- "Happy Birthday, Mr. President", a version of "Happy Birthday to You" sung by Marilyn Monroe for U.S. President John F. Kennedy in 1962
- Happy Birthday to You!, a 1959 book by Dr. Seuss
- "The Happy Birthday Song", a song by Andrew Bird from Andrew Bird & the Mysterious Production of Eggs
