= Return to the Sauce =

Studio album by Infected Mushroom
- Released: January 27, 2017
- Recorded: Infected Mushroom Studio
- Genre: Electronica, psytrance
- Length: 71:19
- Label: HOMmega Productions
- Producer: Erez Eisen, Amit "Duvdev" Duvdevani

Infected Mushroom chronology
Converting Vegetarians II (2015)	Return to the Sauce (2017)	Head of NASA and the 2 Amish Boys (2018)

Return to the Sauce is the tenth studio album by Israeli psychedelic trance duo Infected Mushroom. It was released on January 27, 2017, under HOMmega Productions.

== Composition and themes ==
Return To The Sauce is a return to the psytrance roots of Infected Mushroom's earlier works. Much like its predecessor, 2015s Converting Vegetarians II, the album features heavy use of Infected Mushroom's custom pitch shifting plugin, Manipulator, even getting a song of the same name dedicated to it. Much like Infected Mushroom's earlier work, Return To The Sauce has many middle eastern influences in its melodies and sounds.

== Track listing ==
1. "Flamingo" – 8:44
2. "Manipulator" – 6:33
3. "Return to the Sauce" – 7:46
4. "Groove Attack" – 6:48
5. "Xerox - Gravity Waves (Infected Mushroom Remix 2017)" – 8:36
6. "Demons of Pain (Remix)" – 7:48
7. "Milosh" – 10:49
8. "Nutmeg" – 7:36
9. "Liquid Smoke" – 6:39
10. "Return to the Sauce Continuous Mix" – 48:04

== Charts ==
Chart (2017)	Peak position
Independent Albums (Billboard)	42
Heatseekers Albums (Billboard)	9
