= Birthday (Gentouki album) =

Tanjoubi (Birth Day)

Studio album by Gentouki
- Released: September 21st, 2016
- Genres: J-pop, rock, alternative, R&B
- Length: 40:50
- Labels: Victor Entertainment; VICL-64642

Gentouki chronology
| Romen Densha no CHEESECAKE (2006) | Tanjoubi (Birth Day) (2016) |

Tanjoubi (誕生日, Tanjōbi) is the fifth major studio album by Gentouki, released on September 21, 2016. The album has the official names Tanjoubi and Birth Day, meaning the day of being born, rather than the anniversary of birth. It includes a cover of the Kaoru Miyazaki song "Bye-Bye" and a bonus acoustic version of the single "Sutekina, Ano Hito". Tanjoubi is Gentouki's first release since the best-of album in 2007. This album, as well as past Gentouki albums, features artwork by illustrator Yusuke Nakamura.

== Track listing ==
All words and music written by Jun Tanaka.

| | Release date | Title | Catalog | Track listing | Label |
|---|---|---|---|---|---|
| 5th Album | September 21, 2016 | Tanjoubi (誕生日) | MUCT-1014 | 1. "Tanjōbi" (誕生日, Birth Day) – 3:51; 2. "Goman nen Sabaibā " (5万年サバイバー, 50-Thousand Year Survivor) – 4:26; 3. "Kamome no Kimochi" (カモメの気持ち, A Seagull's Heart) – 5:53; 4. Bye-Bye – 4:47; 5. "Ai no Sabaku" (愛の砂漠, Desert of Love) – 4:09; 6. "Sofutokurīmu to sukāto no kinenbi" (ソフトクリームとスカートの記念日, Anniversary of Ice Cream and a Skirt) – 4:44; 7. "Arugorizumu " (アルゴリズム, Algorithm) – 4:43; 8. Busy Days – 3:58; 9. "Sutekina, Ano Hito" (素敵な、あの人。(Acoustic Ver.) -Bonus Track-, That Wonderful Person) – 4:19 | Victor |

== Personnel ==
- Jun Tanaka – Guitar, vocals, Bass, drums
- Atsushi Ideno – Percussion (Track 3, 6)
- Kazuya Fukuzawa – Guitar (Track 5)
- Tatsuhiko Yoshizawa – Trumpet(Track 5)
- Yoshinari Takegami – Saxophone : (Track 5, 7)
- Nobuhide Handa – Trombone (Track 5)
- Nero – Guitar (Track 6)
- Azu and Kuma (From chocolate) – Backing vocals (Track 6)
- Taiji Okuda – Mixing
