= The Birthday Party (2025 film) =

2025 film by Miguel Ángel Jiménez

- Promotional poster
- Directed by: Miguel Ángel Jiménez
- Screenplay by: Giorgos Karnavas; Miguel Angel Jimenéz; Nicos Panayotopoulos
- Based on: The Birthday Party by Panos Karnezis
- Produced by: Giorgos Karnavas
- Starring: Willem Dafoe; Vic Carmen Sonne; Joe Cole; Emma Suárez
- Cinematography: Gris Jordana
- Edited by: Nacho Ruiz Capillas
- Production companies: Heretic; Lemming Film
- Distributed by: Rosebud.21 (Greece); Paradiso Filmed Entertainment (Netherlands); A Contracorriente Films (Spain)
- Release dates: 7 August 2025 (Locarno); 24 July 2026 (Spain)
- Running time: 103 minutes
- Countries: Greece; Spain; Netherlands; United Kingdom
- Languages: English; Spanish; Greek

The Birthday Party is a 2025 drama film co-written and directed by Miguel Ángel Jiménez, based on the 2007 novel of the same name by Panos Karnezis. It stars Willem Dafoe, Vic Carmen Sonne, Joe Cole, and Emma Suárez. The film had its world premiere in the Piazza Grande section of the 78th Locarno Film Festival on 7 August 2025.

== Premise ==
Greek billionaire Marcos Timoleon hosts a birthday party for his daughter on his private island.

== Cast ==
- Willem Dafoe as Marcos Timoleon
- Vic Carmen Sonne as Sofia Timoleon
- Joe Cole as Ian Forster
- Emma Suárez as Olivia
- Carlos Cuevas as the marquis
- Christos Stergioglou as Patrikios
- Antonis Tsiotsiopoulos
- Pelle Heikkilä
- Francesc Garrido
- Maria Pau Pigem
- Elsa Lekkakou

== Production ==
Principal photography took place in Corfu and Athens. Filming was completed on 17 August 2024.

== Release ==
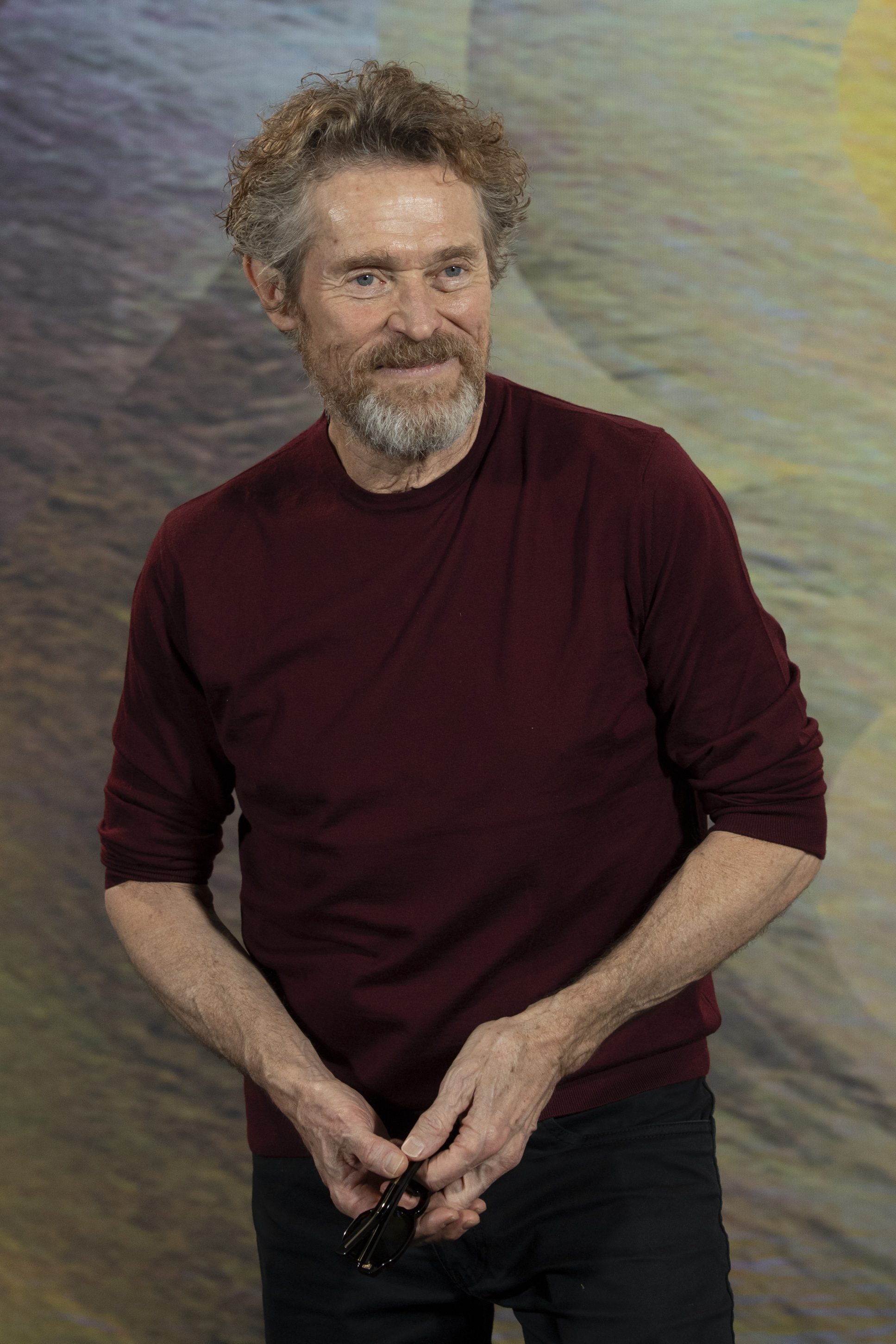
Willem Dafoe at the The Birthday Party photocall at the 78th Locarno Film Festival.

Bankside Films owns the international sales rights to the film, which was previewed at the European Film Market in February 2025. In August 2025, the film was acquired for distribution by Paradiso for the Benelux, Praesens-Film for Switzerland, Hagi Film for Poland, Cinemart for the Czech Republic and Slovakia, Pris for Portugal, Rosebud.21 for Greece, Arthouse Traffic for Ukraine, Budapest Films for Hungary, MCF for the former Yugoslavia, CineLibri for Bulgaria, GPI for the Baltics, and Film Clinic for the MENA.

A promotional clip was released on 31 July 2025. The film had its world premiere at the 78th Locarno Film Festival on 7 August 2025. It will also be screened in the Open Air Premiere Programme of the 31st Sarajevo Film Festival in August 2025. For its Spain premiere, it was programmed at the 10th BCN Film Fest.

A trailer was released on 5 September 2025. Following the film's theatrical run, it will be launched on HBO Europe and HBO Max.

In April 2026, the film was acquired for distribution in North America by Quiver Distribution. The film is scheduled to be released in selected U.S. theaters, and in video on demand on 5 June 2026. A Contracorriente Films plans to release theatrically the film in Spain on 24 July 2026 under the title El anfitrión.

== Reception ==
The film received mostly negative reviews from critics. On Rotten Tomatoes, the film currently has a critics score of 30%, with an average rating of 4.9 out of 10.

Peter Bradshaw of The Guardian rated the film three out of five stars, calling it "a strong, confident picture that hits its measured stride early on". Amber Wilkinson of Screen Daily called the film a "stylish tale of hedonism and heartbreak".

Javier Ocaña of El País decried the salad of names, accents, and presences so much in the vein of 1980s and 1990s euro-puddings, some uplifting by Jordana's beautiful cinematography and some musical moments notwithstanding.
