= It's My Birthday (disambiguation) =

"It's My Birthday" is a 2014 song by will.i.am.

It's My Birthday may also refer to:

- "It's My Birthday" (Braxton Family Values), a television episode
- "It's My Birthday", a song by Mya from K.I.S.S. (Keep It Sexy & Simple), 2011
- "It's My Birthday", a song by Ultimate from Ultra.2011, 2010
