= Converting Vegetarians II =

Studio album by Infected Mushroom
- Released: September 11, 2015
- Recorded: Infected Mushroom Studio
- Genre: Electronica
- Length: 77:44
- Label: Dim Mak Records DM710

Infected Mushroom chronology
Army of Mushrooms (2012)	Converting Vegetarians II (2015)	Return to the Sauce (2017)

Professional ratings
Review scores
Source	Rating
Your EDM	9/10 stars
Sputnikmusic	4/5 stars

Converting Vegetarians II is the ninth studio album by Israeli psychedelic trance duo Infected Mushroom. It was released on September 11, 2015 on Dim Mak Records. It is a sequel to the band's 2003 album Converting Vegetarians.

== Track listing ==
1. "She Zoremet" – 5:14
2. "Yamakas in Space" – 7:33
3. "Sense of Direction" – 3:25
4. "Animatronica" – 6:15
5. "Feelings" – 4:10
6. "Pink Froid" – 7:40
7. "Demons of Pain" – 2:58
8. "Zoan Zound" – 4:31
9. "Blue Swan 5" – 8:58
10. "Fields of Grey (feat. Sasha Grey)" – 4:18
11. "Leopold" – 4:14
12. "On the Road Again" – 3:59
13. "Stuck in a Loop" – 4:23
14. "Mexicali" – 3:45
15. "The Surgeon" – 6:21

== Charts ==
Chart (2015)	Peak position
US Top Dance/Electronic Albums (Billboard)	14
