= Hatikva 6 =

Israeli reggae band

Hatikva 6 התקווה 6
- Origin: Ramat HaSharon, Israel
- Genres: Reggae; Pop; pop rock
- Years active: 2003–present
- Label: Hed Arzi Music
- Members: Omri Glickman; Shelly Glickman; Jonathan Bitton; Barak Hener; Ilan Adiri; Michael Avgil; Ron Linial; Michael Guy

Hatikva 6 (Hebrew: התקווה 6, lit. 'Hope 6') is an Israeli reggae band started in Ramat Hasharon, Israel.

== Origins ==
The band has its origins in Ramat HaSharon where lead singer and guitarist Omri Glickman grew up with his sister, Shelly, keyboardist and vocalist. The band's name comes from the Glickman family's street address, Hatikva 6. During the band's visit to Jamaica, they discovered that “Hope” was also the street name of Bob Marley in Kingston, Jamaica, and felt that this connection was fitting for their band name.

== Career ==
Hatikva 6 plays dancehall and roots styles with Hebrew, English, and French lyrics. While reggae in Israel is a fairly young industry, Hatikva 6 has already been recognized in Israel through major performances all over the country at the biggest musical festivals. They have been compared to Matisyahu, a Jewish reggae artist, for the universality of their music. Much of their music is directly tied to the social, political, and religious aspects of Israeli life which is marked by tension due to the Arab-Israeli conflict, and the diverse religious demographics of the country. Songs such as “Elohim” (“God”, in Hebrew) and “World War x” are songs in which these themes are apparent. This form of musical production is proof of the versatility and cross pollination of reggae and how widespread its influence has become.

In 2007, they released their first single, “Im Efgosh et Elohim” (“If I Meet God”) to success in Israel.

The band's debut album, "Hatikvah 6", was released by Hatav Hashmini in August 2007, with the exception of "If I Meet God." The album also featured the songs "White Night" and "Gaydamak", written by Arkady Gaydamak.

In 2008, the band recorded a cover version of Arik Lavie 's song "I Will Sing You a Song" for the " Hebrew Work 2 " project. In addition, the band recorded the theme song for Gouri Alfi's series "Laugh or Die". The band then toured the United States.

A few months before Dudu Topaz's suicide, they released a song about the man (according to the tune "Do do do dam dam"). In March 2009 released her second album of the band, "Afrokliftos", produced by Assi Ayalon and in collaboration with Anthony B.

In early June 2010, the band released its first single for a third album called "Every Day Again." On June 17, the Company performed at the festival for peace in the extermination camp Auschwitz, near the town of Oswiecim in Poland.

In September, the second single was released from the album "In Paradise Orchards". Later, the third single from the album "Je t'aime" (Je Tém, "I Love You" in French) depicts the story of the best friend of the soloist who fell in love with a girl of Lebanese origin.

Following the Carmel fire tragedy turned chain C band and asked her to do a cover song related to Carmel. The band chose the song "The Green Mountain Forever" together with Ruhama Raz, and later the song entered their fourth album "Kol Israel". In March, the band participated in the Eurovision Song Contest 2011 with the song "All is Cool". In August 2011, the band performed at a major reggae festival in Spain called Rototom Sunsplash.

In March 2012, the band released two singles from their new album "Kol Israel", which was released in the summer of 2012. The first is "This Generation is ours," and the second "When You Were" is a song by Meir Ariel . In July the band released a third single from the album "Kol Israel" called "Jah's Wish". The band released a fourth single, "Where Do I Belong". In early August, the band released its fourth album.

In honor of the project " will soon become a song " In 2012, the band released a song called "my death" written by Lt. Yehuda Leib (Leonard) Cohen composed by Omri Glickman.

In January 2014, the band released an Instagram album containing eight songs, each lasting about 15 seconds.

In February 2014 the band launched "Electronix", an electronic tour in cooperation with the producer and creator Gal Goren, which includes new arrangements for her familiar songs.

On June 26, 2014, the band released its first single "Once Again" from its fifth album. On August 24 it released the second single "Hachi Israeli" and on November 24 released the third single "Whatever Happens." In June they released the song "Put More Rum" on me.

On September 10, 2015, the song "Hachi Israeli" entered the first ten songs in Galgalatz 's annual parade and won seventh place.

In 2016 the band released four songs: "Koh Phangan", in collaboration with Infected Mushroom, "Something Pleasant for the Soul" "Keep an eye on us" with Mosh Ben Ari and "Haim in the Film". That same year, they won the second consecutive title of the Year of the Year at Galgalatz's annual parade.

In 2016, Omri and Shelly Glickman began a weekly program in Galgalatz.

On January 23, 2017, the band released a new single, and a clip alongside it, of the theme song of their last album "All Before."

In February 2017, the band's music was positively reviewed by Rabbi Reuven Greenwald in a column published by the official website of the Union for Reform Judaism.

On December 16, 2018, the band released the song "A Beautiful Day?"

In early 2024, the band released “Giborei Al” (Superheroes), describing Israeli citizens as everyday superheroes, in response to the Simchat Torah Massacre.
