= Legend of the Black Shawarma =

Studio album by Infected Mushroom
- Released: September 8, 2009
- Recorded: Infected Mushroom Studio
- Genre: Psychedelic trance; trip hop; industrial; psychedelic rock
- Length: 86:56
- Label: Perfecto, Hom-Mega
- Producer: Amit Duvdevani, Erez Eisen

Infected Mushroom chronology
Vicious Delicious (2007)	Legend of the Black Shawarma (2009)	Army of Mushrooms (2012)

Professional ratings
Review scores
Source	Rating
Allmusic	3.5/5 stars

Legend of the Black Shawarma is the seventh studio album by the Israeli psychedelic trance duo Infected Mushroom released on September 8, 2009. The album is named after a shawarma, a Middle Eastern wrap/sandwich; the equivalent of the döner kebab in Turkey or the gyros in Greece. The title was also inspired by Shawarma Hazan, a shawarma restaurant where Erez and Amit used to eat in their hometown, Haifa.

== History ==
Infected Mushroom had originally intended for the album to be a concept album, the concept being a food diary of the group's favorite restaurants. Thus came the first tracks written for the album, named after the restaurants Poquito Mas, Saeed, Franks, and most notably Shawarma Hazan. However, the group eventually decided to break off from this concept, with songs such as the lead single, Smashing the Opponent.

== Tracks ==
1. "Poquito Mas" (Spanish for "Little Bit More" [sic]) – 3:39
2. "Saeed" (سعيد, Arabic for "Happy") – 7:03
3. "End of the Road" – 6:47
4. "Smashing the Opponent" (Vocals: Jonathan Davis of Korn) – 4:10
5. "Can't Stop" – 7:23
6. "Herbert the Pervert" – 7:17
7. "Killing Time" (Vocals: Perry Farrell of Jane's Addiction) – 3:04
8. "Project 100" – 9:38
9. "Franks" – 8:05
10. "Slowly" – 9:00
11. "The Legend of the Black Shawarma" – 7:11
12. "Riders on the Storm" (Remix of song by The Doors) – 4:29
13. "Bust a Move" (Infected Mushroom Remix) – 9:10 (iTunes Bonus track, included as the 7th track on the album)

== Personnel ==
- Brian Porizek – art direction, design
- Jeff McMillan – cover artwork
- UZIgraphics – design (logo)
- Paul Oakenfold – executive producer
- Infected Mushroom – performers

== Charts ==
Chart	Peak position
U.S. Billboard 200	172
U.S. Billboard Top Electronic Albums	9
U.S. Billboard Top Independent Albums	32
U.S. Billboard Top Heatseekers	8
Top 100 Mexico	55
