= The Birthday Party (novel) =

Novel by Panos Karnezis

- The cover of the first edition, July 2007
- Author: Panos Karnezis
- Language: English
- Genre: Novel
- Publisher: Jonathan Cape
- Publication date: 2007
- Publication place: United Kingdom
- Media type: Print (Hardback)
- Pages: 272 pp.
- ISBN: 978-0-224-07932-7
- OCLC: 85828850

The Birthday Party is a biographical novel by Panos Karnezis first published in 2007.

== Plot introduction ==
Set on a single day in late summer of 1975, it is about the rise to wealth and fame of Marco Timoleon, a 72-year-old Greek shipping magnate who for that end of August day has arranged a grand party on his private island in the Aegean to celebrate his daughter's 25th birthday. In a series of flashbacks, the omniscient narrator of the novel chronicles the businessman's life from his childhood days in İzmir to his present cosmopolitan existence and status as one of the richest men in the world. However, being a master at deception, the billionaire has rewritten his own history so often that there are patches of his past his family know next to nothing about and of which even his official biographer cannot make head or tail. Sensing now that his life is gradually drawing to a close, Timoleon plans to use the birthday party as his final attempt to take influence on his daughter's extravagant life and, by doing so, to ensure that his accumulated wealth stays in the family.

Practically all reviewers have pointed out the numerous parallels between the fictional protagonist and Aristotle Onassis.

== Plot summary ==
Marco Timoleon is born somewhere in Anatolia in 1903 to a railway engineer father and a schoolteacher mother. When he is one year old, his parents move to İzmir, where he spends his childhood and adolescence. A mediocre pupil, he drops out of high school at 18, only months before graduation, having already proven his business acumen at the age of 15 by buying a dilapidated boat, repairing it himself and then renting it out. One day his father walks out on his family, never to be seen, or heard of, again, and in 1921, during the Greco-Turkish War, Timoleon decides to seek his fortune in Argentina. Leaving his mother behind, he travels to Buenos Aires and starts working for a telephone company. It is in South America that he lays the foundation of his wealth, operating on both sides of the law and increasingly applying as yet unheard of business practices such as closing contracts to transport oil on tankers that have not been built yet. During that time he also makes the acquaintance of Dr Aristide Patrikios, a physician and fellow Greek who will become his only lifelong friend. As far as his private life is concerned, in his younger years it never occurs to Timoleon to get married, but he has countless love affairs, also with married women.

In 1939, having become rich man, and erroneously nicknamed by business competitors as "the Turk," he moves his company headquarters to New York City. During the Second World War his growing fleet services both the Allies and the Axis powers, resulting in increased profit. All the time carrying on with his love life, only after his 40th birthday does Timoleon think the time has come for him to get married and have offspring. From a middle-class background himself, he has always been in awe of aristocracy and attracted by the richer classes, so he starts courting the 16-year-old daughter of shipping tycoon Daniel Negri, Miranda, who is still attending prep school. In 1948, against her father's wish, the couple get married when Miranda is 19 and Timoleon is 44 years old.

The Timoleons move to London, and Miranda gives birth to two children, Sofia (in 1950) and Daniel (in 1954). While Timoleon's business prospers in the wake of the Suez Crisis, making him one of the richest men in the world, his marriage soon disintegrates, and the children are left in the care of a nanny and a governess while the two spouses increasingly go their separate ways. Miranda Timoleon, unprepared for life's harsh realities due to an over-protective Catholic upbringing, seeks solace in tranquillizers but eventually tries to combat her husband's continued womanising by having love affairs herself. In 1964, at a point where the couple consider divorce and a legal battle over custody of the children is likely to break out, Miranda Timoleon, aged 35, dies of a drug overdose on the private island her husband has recently bought. A carefully planned suicide, her death nevertheless stirs rumours, notably in the yellow press, that Marco Timoleon may have killed his wife, either intentionally or unintentionally, and the tycoon himself feels no need ever to disperse them.

As his children grow up, Timoleon tries to prepare them for adult life but soon realizes that there is little he can do to mould their characters and influence their decisions. He finds out that Sofia is more and more taking after him, especially as far as her voracious sexual appetite is concerned. Moving out of the family home, which is now in Paris, France, at the age of 18, she embarks on a life described by the narrator as a "permanent holiday":

Sofia was interested in business even less than her brother was. She had struggled through boarding-school, graduating only thanks to a generous donation from Marco Timoleon and refusing to continue to university despite her father's pressure and the pleas of Miss Rees, whom Marco had asked to mediate knowing the retired governess still wielded influence over his daughter.

These days Sofia passed her time travelling with an ever-growing group of friends, who depended on her generosity and agreed with everything that she said before she said it. They stayed at exclusive hotels where they demanded the best rooms without having made reservations. Marco Timoleon's reputation and money meant that foreign dignitaries in curlers, half-shaved ambassadors with lather on their cheeks and honeymooners in bathrobes were asked to vacate their suites with the excuse that a mistake had been made in allocating their rooms. [...]

The world in the morning was an unknown planet to her: no matter when she went to bed, at midnight or at dawn, she woke up in late afternoon, usually with company, having inherited her father's sexual energy. She had lunch in bed, naked, letting her ephemeral lover feed her, and then took a long bath, not to cleanse herself of sin, for she believed neither in sin nor retribution, but to give the stranger time to dress and leave the room. Not caring about social class, she slept with waiters, bellboys and security guards as long as they had a nice face and a good body. [...] (Chapter 4)

Daniel Timoleon, on the other hand, has developed into an inconspicuous introvert whose only passion is flying planes: he shows no interest whatsoever in his father's business and ignores each of the eligible young women presented to him by his father. The family is ripped further apart when, in 1969, Timoleon, now 66, meets 33-year-old American divorcee Olivia Andersen and in the following year decides to marry her. Sofia takes an instant dislike to her stepmother, and it only takes a few years for Timoleon's second marriage to show signs of failure, too, so much so that in the end Olivia, whose permanent residence is a penthouse apartment in New York City, is not allowed to enter her husband's island without his prior consent.

In early 1973 Ian Forster, an eager British journalist, approaches Timoleon with the proposal to write his authorised biography. Timoleon agrees to the project and pays all of Forster's expenses although he soon turns out to be far less co-operative than Forster would have wished. Also, he has him sign a confidentiality agreement so that the young would-be author lives in constant fear of never being able to publish his extensively researched book. While interviewing everyone still alive who has ever been close to the shipping magnate, Forster also makes the acquaintance of Sofia Timoleon, who, without her knowledge, is being spied on by her father's private investigators. Probably out of boredom, Sofia adds Forster to her long list of lovers, but their unexpected mutual attraction leads to a longer love affair conducted in what they believe is absolute secrecy. In truth, however, Timoleon is informed about each and every move the two lovers make.

Despite the 1973 oil crisis, which affects his business badly, the biggest blow to Timoleon's life is his son's death in a plane crash in the summer of 1974. While entertaining a married woman half his age in his earthly paradise for the weekend, Timoleon sees one of his old Piaggio seaplanes piloted by Daniel approaching the island in bad weather and actually becomes an eye-witness to his son's fatal accident when the plane is overturned during the landing procedure. Timoleon is shattered by the loss of his child, and his robust health slowly starts to deteriorate, the most obvious sign for the ageing tycoon being the realisation of his sudden impotence.

Naturally, Timoleon turns his attention to his daughter as his last hope. When he is informed in the spring of 1975 that Sofia has seen her gynaecologist and he listens to a taped telephone conversation between her and Forster in which she informs her lover that she is pregnant, he feels the urgent need to do something about this uncalled for situation before it is too late. Intending to persuade Sofia to have an abortion right during her stay on the island, he has one of the many guest rooms of his villa converted into an operating theatre, hires Dr Patrikios and a nurse to perform the operation, and, to her great surprise, sends Sofia an invitation to a lavish birthday party in honour of her 25th birthday. On the day of the party, he arranges a private talk with Ian Forster during which he threateningly explains to him that he will be allowed to publish anything about his life on condition that he can persuade Sofia to have an abortion and that he subsequently vanish from her life forever. When Forster cautiously broaches the subject to Sofia, she realises how little her love for him is reciprocated. She tells Forster that she has never been pregnant, that she only wanted to put his loyalty to the test, and that he has failed that test as far as she is concerned. Then she breaks off their relationship and retires to her room while the party is still in full swing. There, having inherited her mother's melancholy disposition, Sofia swallows an overdose of pills. She survives her suicide attempt because on the following day she is rescued by Dr Patrikios and the nurse.

Marco Timoleon dies two years later, aged 74.

== Parallels to the life of Aristotle Onassis ==
- Onassis, who hailed from İzmir, also belonged to the Greek minority in Asia Minor.
- He also went to Buenos Aires as a young man and worked there for a telephone company.
- The fictional and the historical shipping magnate resorted to similarly shady business practices.
- They both led an active sex life.
- Onassis also married into money—his first wife was Athina Livanos, the daughter of a Greek business mogul. His second marriage to Jacqueline Kennedy was also to a woman many years his junior who was a Catholic U.S. citizen.
- Timoleon's unnamed private island resembles Skorpios, the island in the Ionian Sea owned by Onassis.
- Christina O, the Onassis family yacht, named after Christina Onassis by her father, was, just like The Sofia in the novel, one of the most famous society venues of the mid-20th century.
- Alexandros Onassis also died in a plane crash a few years before his father's death.

== Film adaptation ==
A film adaptation starring Willem Dafoe was released in 2025.

== Reviews ==
- Jonathan Derbyshire: "The Birthday Party", Financial Times (August 11, 2007).
- Jonathan Gibbs: "The Birthday Party, by Panos Karnezis, The Independent on Sunday (July 18, 2007).
- Maya Jaggi: "The Rich Also Cry", The Guardian (July 21, 2007).
- Mark Sanderson: "The Cunningly Told Story of a Domestic Tyrant", The Daily Telegraph (August 1, 2007).
- "The Last Tycoon You Would Want", The Scotsman (July 7, 2007).
- "Making of a Magnate", www.metro.co.uk (June 28, 2007).
- Frances Wilson: "A Bumpy Night", Literary Review (August, 2007).
