= Astrix =

Israeli psy trance music DJ and producer

Astrix אבי שמיילוב
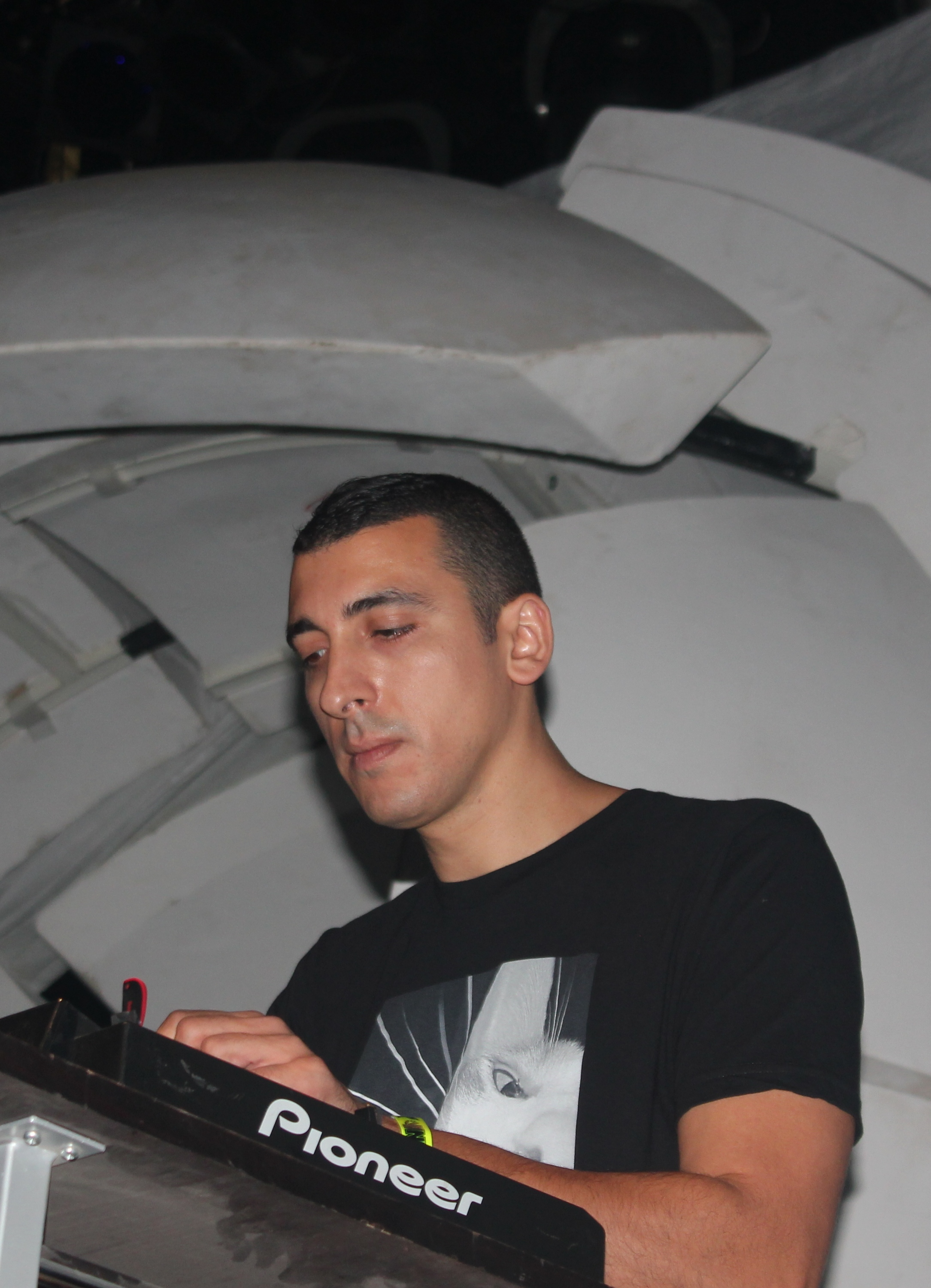
- Astrix performing in Moscow in 2013

Background information
- Born: Avi Shmailov; 5 December 1981 (age 44); Georgian Soviet Socialist Republic, USSR
- Origin: Tel Aviv, Israel
- Genres: Psychedelic trance
- Occupations: Musician, DJ, record producer
- Years active: 1995–present
- Labels: HOM-Mega Productions, Spiraltrax Label Group, Tokyo Productions, Plastik Park, Shamanic Tales

Avi Shmailov (Hebrew: אבי שמיילוב) known by his stage name Astrix, is an Israeli trance music DJ and producer. His specialty lies in the subgenre of progressive psychedelic trance. In 2006, Astrix achieved the 41st position in DJMag's "Top 100 DJs" annual ranking, alongside several other Israeli musicians, with Infected Mushroom ranking the highest at No. 9. The following year, in 2007, Astrix climbed to the 18th spot on the list, marking a significant representation of the Israeli electronic music scene in the global rankings.

== Early career ==
Astrix was born in Georgia located in what was then, the USSR, to a Mountain Jewish family in the Caucasus and grew up in Tel Aviv, Israel. He began recording music under the name Astrix in 1997, sometimes misconceived to be taken from the Asterix comic books. An interview on the UK clubbing website Harderfaster.net revealed the name was chosen simply for sounding good, and not directly influenced by anything in particular.

=== 1995–2002 ===
Astrix started as a DJ in 1995 playing alternative and 1980s music. It was during this time that he learned about electronic music. In 1997 he began his first in-house studio recordings using a personal computer. He learned about trance in 1997 after being invited to a trance party. "At first it was a very new and strange experience for me and I couldn't find myself, but I was impressed by the energy and the impact that the music had made on the people at the party." At the beginning of his career in the late 1990s he produced tracks in the "nitzhonot" style of trance, an anthemic offshoot of Goa trance. His first tracks were "In Peace" and "Eakhis World," which both appeared on the nitzhonot compilation Ptzatzot 3.

=== 2002–2010 ===
In 2002, Astrix signed to the EDM label HOMmega Productions with his debut album Eye to Eye. In a 2003 interview Astrix said that he worked on three albums by Alien Project, but its maintainer Ari Linker did not give him credit. Touring after the Eye to Eye album release and working on other projects did not leave much studio time for Astrix and it took two years to write his second album, Artcore, which came out in 2004. He also produced the albums Nu-clear Visions of Israel (TIP.World, 2003), Psychedelic Academy (Hit Mania, 2005) and Astrix & Friends (DJ mag, 2007). In 2009, Astrix's label, HOMmega Productions, was the first to release a digital album from Astrix on a USB flash drive, One Step Ahead (HOMmega Productions, 2009). Astrix then undertook an almost nonstop worldwide tour.

Festivals he has performed at included Dance Valley, SW4, Creamfields, Love Parade, UAF, Planeta Atlantida and headlined nights in the best clubs and venues such as Alexandra Palace, Brixton Academy, Pacha, Ministry of Sound, The city, Volume and Nox.

=== 2010–present ===
Astrix worked on his third studio album for HOMmega productions. Red Means Distortion was released September 2010 .

The Acid Rocker EP, which was released in August 2010, was the first release from the next studio album, Red Means Distortion. As bonus material, it included a remix by trance artist Pixel of "Closer to Heaven" featured vocalist Michele Adamson, and a fresh new GMS 2010 remix to Astrix's "Eye to Eye". In September, a month after the Acid rocker EP was released, the third album Red means distortion was released. Starting in August 2010, Astrix has been creating mix sessions titled Trance for Nations.

== Musical style ==
Astrix says his music has solid, driving basslines and ascending melodies. Many would consider his style to be a crossover between "full-on" and the "clubbier" end of Trance, exemplified by his Psychedelic Academy Mix.

Author Graham St John, of the book The Local Scenes and Global Culture of Psytrance, noted about Astrix's sound, "crisp spacious acoustics".

=== Influences ===
Astrix has been cited as being musically influenced by Infected Mushroom. "I look up to them for inspiration and for some kind of spiritual fuel as it were." Other influences include Linkin Park and Paul Van Dyk. "I also have a love for alternative bands like Linkin Park, and as electronic producer I like Paul Van Dyk, he inspires me very much to see how well you can mix business with music and how big you can become from something that was so small in the beginning."

== Discography ==
=== Albums ===
- Eye to Eye (2002)
- Artcore (2004)
- One Step Ahead (2008)
- Red Means Distortion (2010)
- He.art (2016)

=== EPs/singles ===
- Coolio, 2004, HOMmega Productions
- Coolio (12"), 2004, Tokyo Dance
- Closer to Heaven (12"), 2005, Tokyo Dance
- Future Music EP, 2007, Spiral Trax
- Acid Rocker EP, 2010, HOMmega HD
- Reunion, 2011, Plastik Park
- Type 1, 2012, HOMmega HD
- Stars on 35, 2012, HOMmega HD
- High on Mel, 2013, HOMmega HD

== Appearances ==
=== DVD videos ===
- The Gathering, 2002 - 2007, Vision Quest Productions
- X-Mode Vol. 6 Back to the Future, 2004, Tokyo X-Ray Studios Productions
- Supervision - NTSC/PAL, 2006, Tip.World Productions
- Boom Festival 2008 - We Are All - NTSC/PAL, 2009, GoodMood Productions
- The Beach 2009, FinePlay Records Productions
