= Army of Mushrooms =

Studio album by Infected Mushroom
- Released: May 8, 2012
- Recorded: Infected Mushroom Studio
- Genres: Psychedelic trance, electro house, dubstep, glitch hop
- Length: 85:57
- Label: Dim Mak Records (DM270)

Infected Mushroom chronology
| Legend of the Black Shawarma (2009) | Army of Mushrooms (2012) | Converting Vegetarians II (2015) |

Professional ratings
Review scores
| Source | Rating |
|---|---|
| Consequence of Sound | C+ |
| Spin | 7/10 |

Army of Mushrooms is the eighth studio album by Infected Mushroom released on May 8, 2012, under Dim Mak Records. It features a cover of "The Pretender" by Foo Fighters, "Serve My Thirst", and "U R So F**ked" (which was released as a single/video on February 14, 2012).

== Background ==
Similar to the release of Vicious Delicious, Army of Mushrooms differs greatly from their previous styles, with experimentation in dubstep, electro house, and drum and bass. Some versions of the album contain a remixed version of "Bust A Move" from Classical Mushroom titled "Bust A Move (Infected Remix)"; this same remix is included on their previous studio album Legend of the Black Shawarma.

The album is the first Infected Mushroom album to be released on the Steve Aoki label Dim Mak Records, with whom Infected Mushroom signed in late 2011. The singles "Nation of Wusses" and "U R So Fucked" were released on Dim Mak and licensed through Universal Music. The promotional single "The Pretender" was released primarily on Dim Mak. The album's cover art is the work of Russian artist Anton Semenov (also known as Gloom82).

== Chart performance ==
The album debuted at number 71 on the Canadian Albums Chart.

== Track listing ==
1. "Never Mind" – 6:05
2. "Nothing to Say" – 6:28
3. "Send Me an Angel" – 7:25 (Mashina cover)
4. "U R So F**ked" – 4:41
5. "The Rat" – 7:43
6. "Nation of Wusses" – 7:02
7. "Wanted To" – 3:24 (Featuring Maya Isacowitz and Ryan Starr)
8. "Serve My Thirst" – 6:46
9. "I Shine" – 5:43
10. "Drum n Bassa" – 7:12 ("Bassa" in Hebrew means "Bummer")
11. "The Pretender" – 6:34 (Foo Fighters cover)
12. "The Messenger 2012" – 10:38 (remix of their track "The Messenger" from 2000)
13. "Swingish" – 6:16 (digital release bonus track)

== Personnel ==
Adapted from the album credits.

- Anton Semenov - cover artwork
- UZIgraphics - graphic design
- Steve Aoki - executive producer
- Joel Mark - management
- Ron Rivlin - management
- Amit Duvdevani - producer, mixing, mastering (tracks: 1, 2, 4 to 10, 12)
- Erez Eisen - producer, mixing, mastering (tracks: 1, 2, 4 to 10, 12)
