= Head of NASA and the 2 Amish Boys =

Studio album by Infected Mushroom
- Released: 12 December 2018
- Genre: Psychedelic trance
- Length: 48:01
- Label: Monstercat

Infected Mushroom chronology
Return to the Sauce (2017)	Head of NASA and the 2 Amish Boys (2018)	More Than Just a Name (2020)

Singles from Head of NASA and the 2 Amish Boys
- 1. "Walking on the Moon" Released: 30 August 2018; 2. "Bliss on Mushrooms" Released: 8 November 2018; 3. "Guitarmass" Released: 10 December 2018; 4. "Lost In Space" Released: 11 December 2018

Head of NASA and the 2 Amish Boys is the eleventh studio album by Israeli psytrance duo Infected Mushroom. It was released on 12 December 2018, and is the duo's first album on Canada-based electronic record label Monstercat.

== Tour ==
In January 2019, Infected Mushroom announced a tour promoting the album, called the "Head of NASA Tour". The tour began on 21 February 2019.

== Track listing ==
No.	Title	Length
1.	"Bliss on Mushrooms" (with Bliss, featuring Miyavi)	9:31
2.	"Guitarmass"	6:38
3.	"Head of NASA"	7:45
4.	"Chenchen Barvaz"	7:42
5.	"Walking on the Moon"	5:36
6.	"Here We Go Go Go"	5:55
7.	"Lost in Space (Note: Remix of a song of the same name by Tuna)" (with Tuna, featuring A-WA)	4:55
Total length:		48:02

== Charts ==
Chart (2018)	Peak position
US Dance/Electronic Album Sales (Billboard)	10
