= Infected Mushroom =

Israeli psytrance/electronica duo

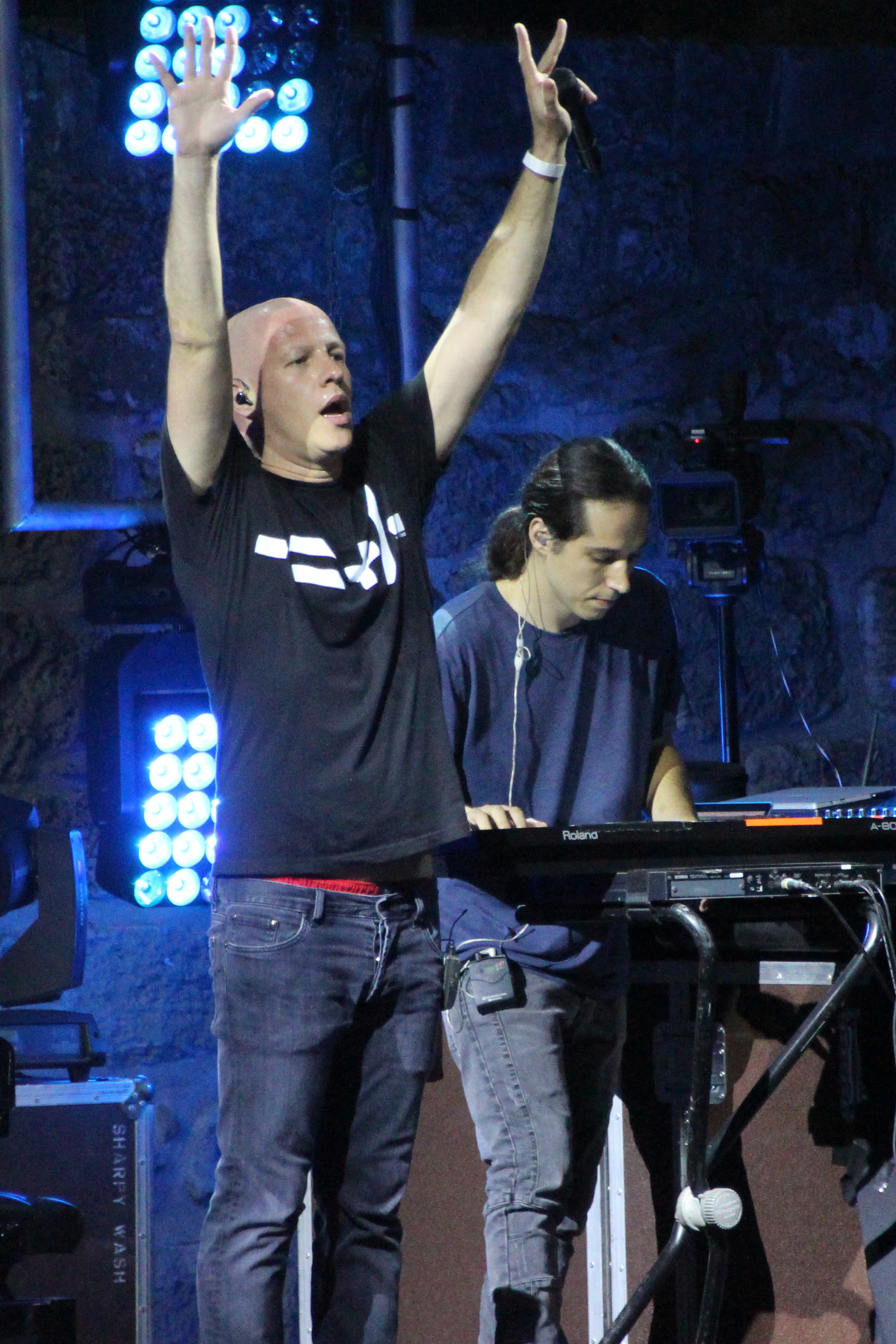
- Infected Mushroom performing in Binyamina in 2015

Background information
- Origin: Kiryat Yam, Haifa District, Israel
- Genres: Psychedelic trance, electro house, electronica, dream trance, electronic rock, glitch hop, classical music, industrial, experimental, progressive psytrance
- Years active: 1996–present
- Labels: BNE, Hom-Mega, Dim Mak, Perfecto, Monstercat
- Members: Amit Duvdevani; Erez Eisen
- Website: infected-mushroom.com

Infected Mushroom (Hebrew: אינפקטד מאשרום) is an Israeli musical duo formed in Haifa in 1996 by producers Erez Eisen (ארז אייזן) and Amit Duvdevani (עמית דובדבני). They produce and perform psytrance, electronica, dream trance and psychedelic music. They are one of the best-selling groups in Israeli music history in terms of both domestic and international sales.

They employ a variety of musical sources, including acoustic guitars and complex synthesized basses. Their compositions often contain changes of drum beat and tempo. Infected Mushroom's live shows feature vocals and analogue instruments in performances that are set against a multimedia backdrop.

== Members ==
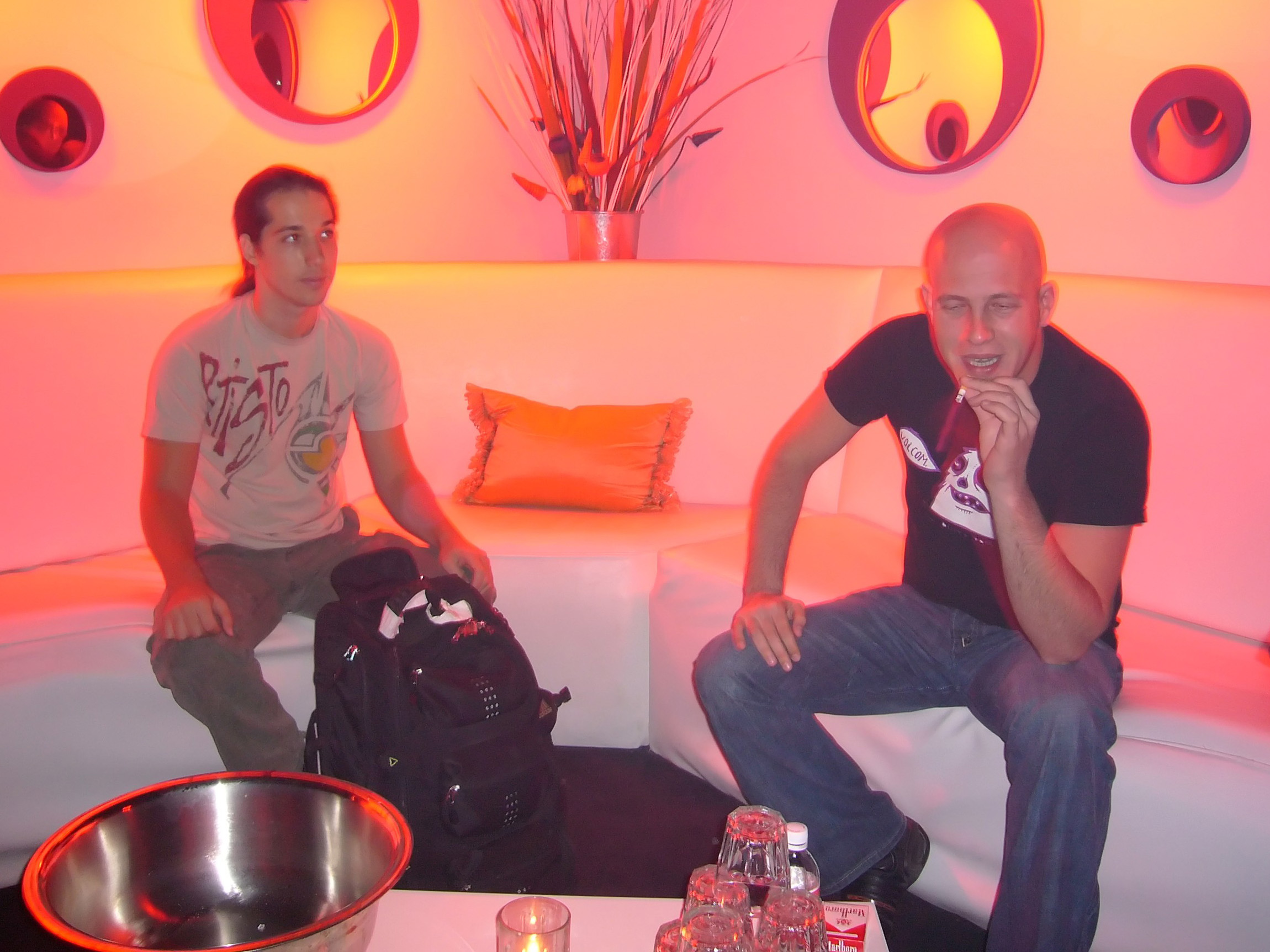
Infected Mushroom at the DNA Lounge in 2002

Erez Eisen was born on 8 September 1980 in Qiryat Yam, Israel. He began classical musical training at a young age, learning to play the organ at the age of four and studying classical piano at the Haifa Conservatory from the age of eight. Eisen later became involved with computerized music, beginning with Impulse Tracker and later moving to more advanced musical composition software.

Eisen had collaborated with DJ Jörg and other notable psytrance artists by the age of 18, and has released three albums and many singles under other psytrance monikers, including Shidapu and Shiva Shidapu.

Amit Duvdevani was born on 7 November 1974 in Israel and has a similar musical background as Eisen. He started to play classical piano at age seven and continued to do so for nine years. He then progressed to heavy metal music and punk rock. Duvdevani played keyboards and wrote most of the material for the Haifa punk rock band Enzyme—he attended his first trance party in 1991.

Duvdevani was conscripted into the Israel Defense Forces, where he was first nicknamed, "Duvdev". After he finished his conscription in Israel, Duvdevani lived in India for a year, primarily in the Indian state of Goa. Duvdevani later collaborated with a member of Shiva Shidapu on four tracks, but they were never released.

== Career ==
=== 1996–2004: First four studio albums ===
Eisen and Duvdevani first began to play together in 1996. A few of their early efforts were released under the name Shidapu & Duvdev. The duo then renamed themselves Infected Mushroom, a name they stole from a local punk band that had been disbanded. The young duo drew inspiration from The Prodigy and Metallica. In an interview with Psychedelic Magazine, the duo stated they were naturally attracted to the psytrance genre through its popularity. In 1998, the group began work on their first album, 1999's The Gathering, inspired by Simon Posford, X-Dream and Transwave. This album featured a dark, rhythmic sonic atmosphere exemplified by its popular track, "Psycho", using a sample from the movie Batman & Robin. It was one of the first albums to bring Israeli psytrance to mainstream audiences, and contributed to the genre's worldwide popularity.

Their 2000 album, Classical Mushroom, contained "Bust a Move". The album is commonly referred to as one of the group's best efforts, one in which they continued their sonic evolution.

The duo's 2001 B.P. Empire is notable for the musical epic "Dancing with Kadafi", which segues numerous styles of music, most notably through middle-eastern style melodies and a classical break which showcases Erez and Amit's piano skills. The name "Dancing with Kadafi" may be a reference to Erez's cat, who was named Kadafi.

Converting Vegetarians (2003), was a two-disc set. The disc titled "Trance Side" contained trance-like dancefloor material comparable to their earlier work, while the disc titled "The Other Side" contained genre-bending experimental music. "The Other Side" included Duvdev's vocal debut on the title track, the down-tempo "Elation Station", and the electro-pop tracks "Blink" and "Illuminaughty".

=== 2004–2007: IM the Supervisor and increasing popularity ===
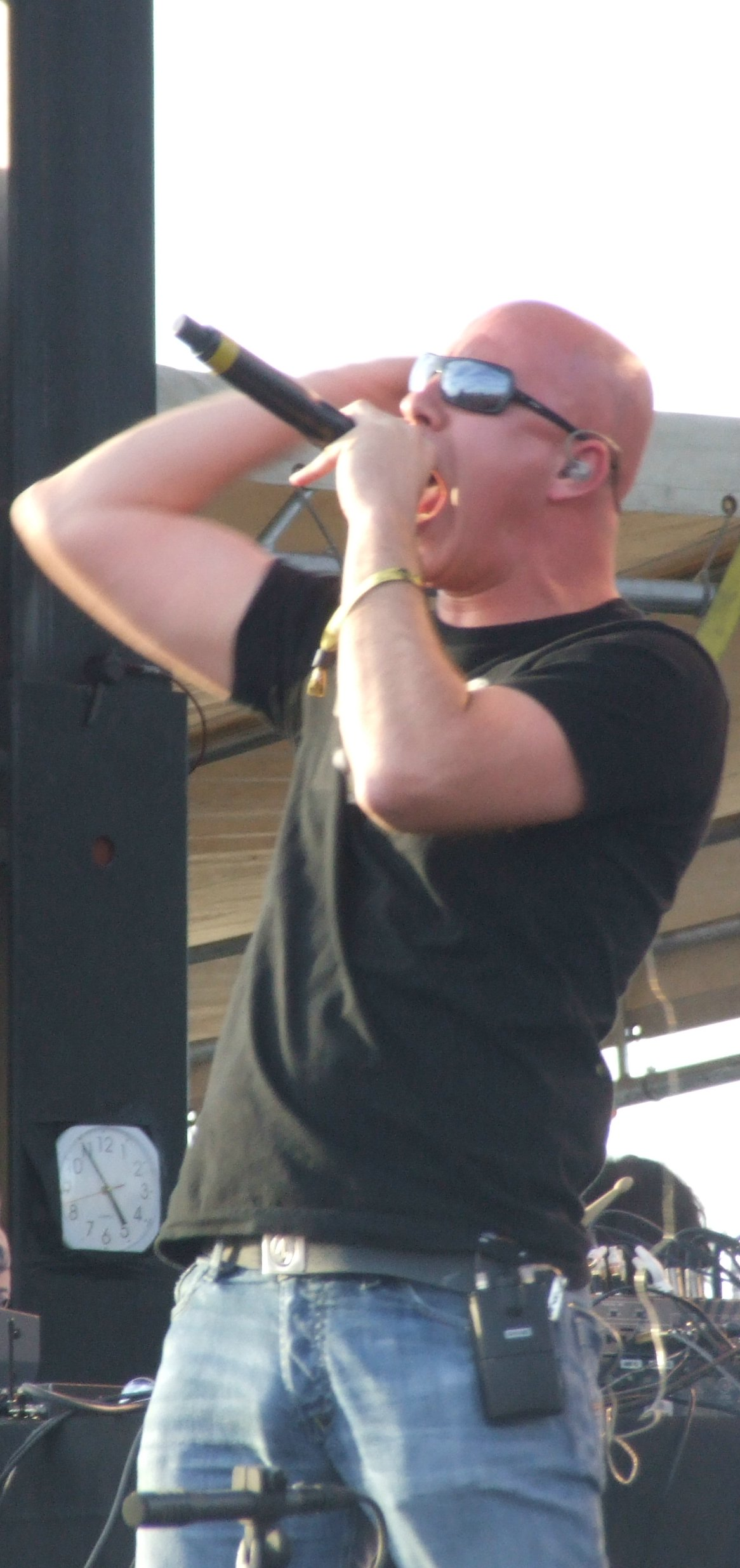
Vegoose festival, Sam Boyd Stadium, 2007.

The 2004 release of IM The Supervisor, continued to mix psytrance with other musical genres and became Infected Mushroom's best-selling album to date. It was psychedelic in a way that dance music rarely had been prior to its release. Certain parts of IM The Supervisor, most notably the gamelan-like noises, cut-up samples, and the old-school sequencer throb of "Bombat," were lauded as innovative at the time.

Guitarists Thomas Cunningham and Erez Netz joined the group in 2004, the same year as the band relocated from their Haifa base to a studio in Los Angeles, California. Brazilian percussionist Rogério Jardim was recruited later on, in 2007.

Infected Mushroom rose to #9 in the influential DJmag Top 100 DJs poll and were the highest placed psytrance DJs in the category's 2007 debut appearance, a reflection of the role the group had played in the genre's increased worldwide popularity.

=== 2007–2012: Vicious Delicious and Legend of the Black Shawarma ===
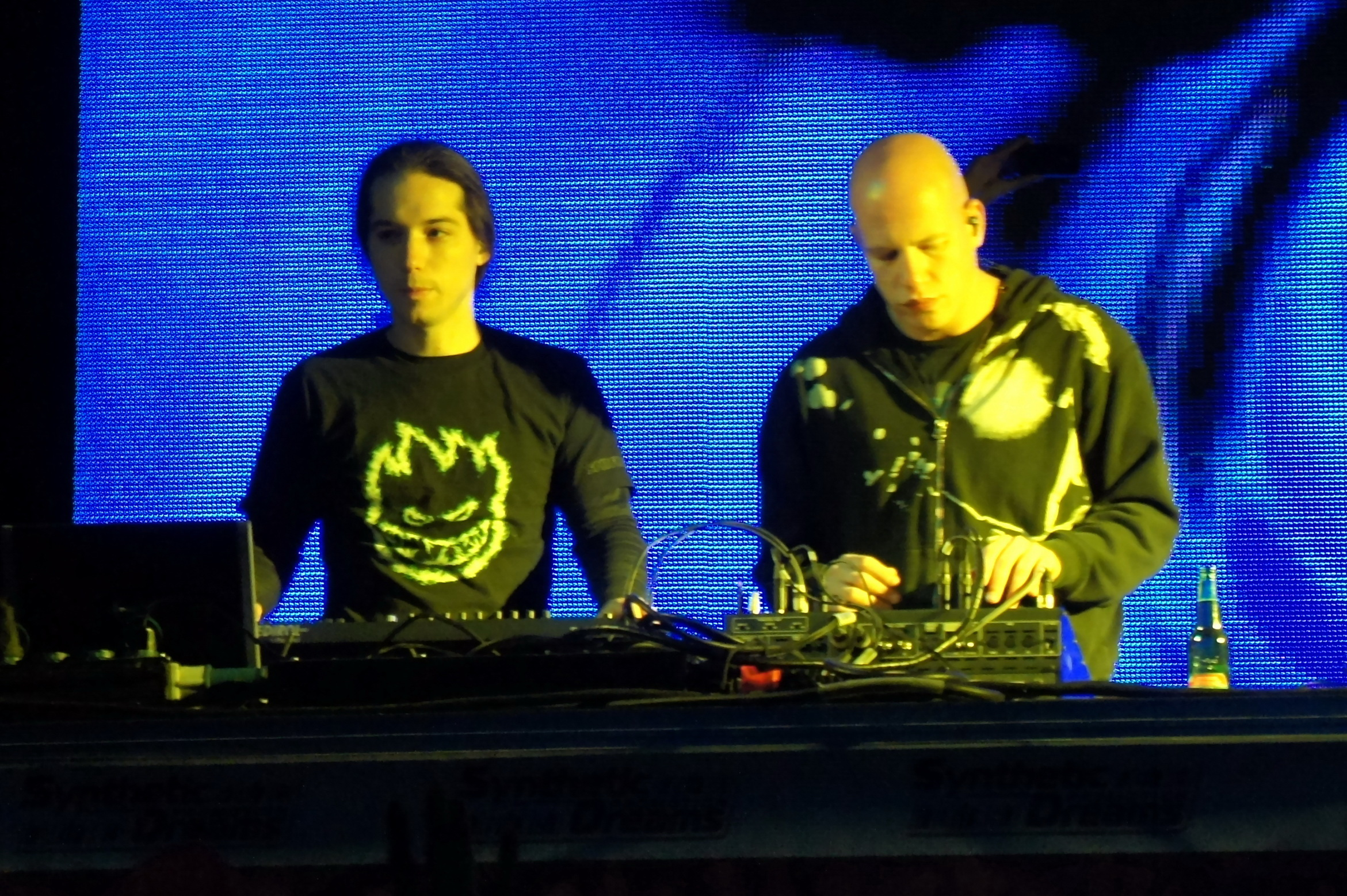
Infected Mushroom in Russia (2011)

Vicious Delicious, considered by some as their most diverse musical effort up until that point, was released in 2007. The album includes "Becoming Insane"—a Spanish-guitar-led track containing Spanish lyrics—a collaboration with Gil Cerezo of the Mexican band Kinky, and the hip hop-influenced "Artillery" featuring rappers Swollen Members. The overall album features more guest vocalists than previous albums, as well as live guitars and drums.

Legend of the Black Shawarma was released in 2009. It includes a remix of The Doors song "Riders on the Storm", and continues the stylistic variety and use of guest vocalists. The album title refers to an Australian who wanted to go to sea in a shark-proof cage and was told that he would seem like "black shawarma", a West Asian delicacy, to the sharks.

=== 2012–2015: Army of Mushrooms and Friends on Mushrooms ===
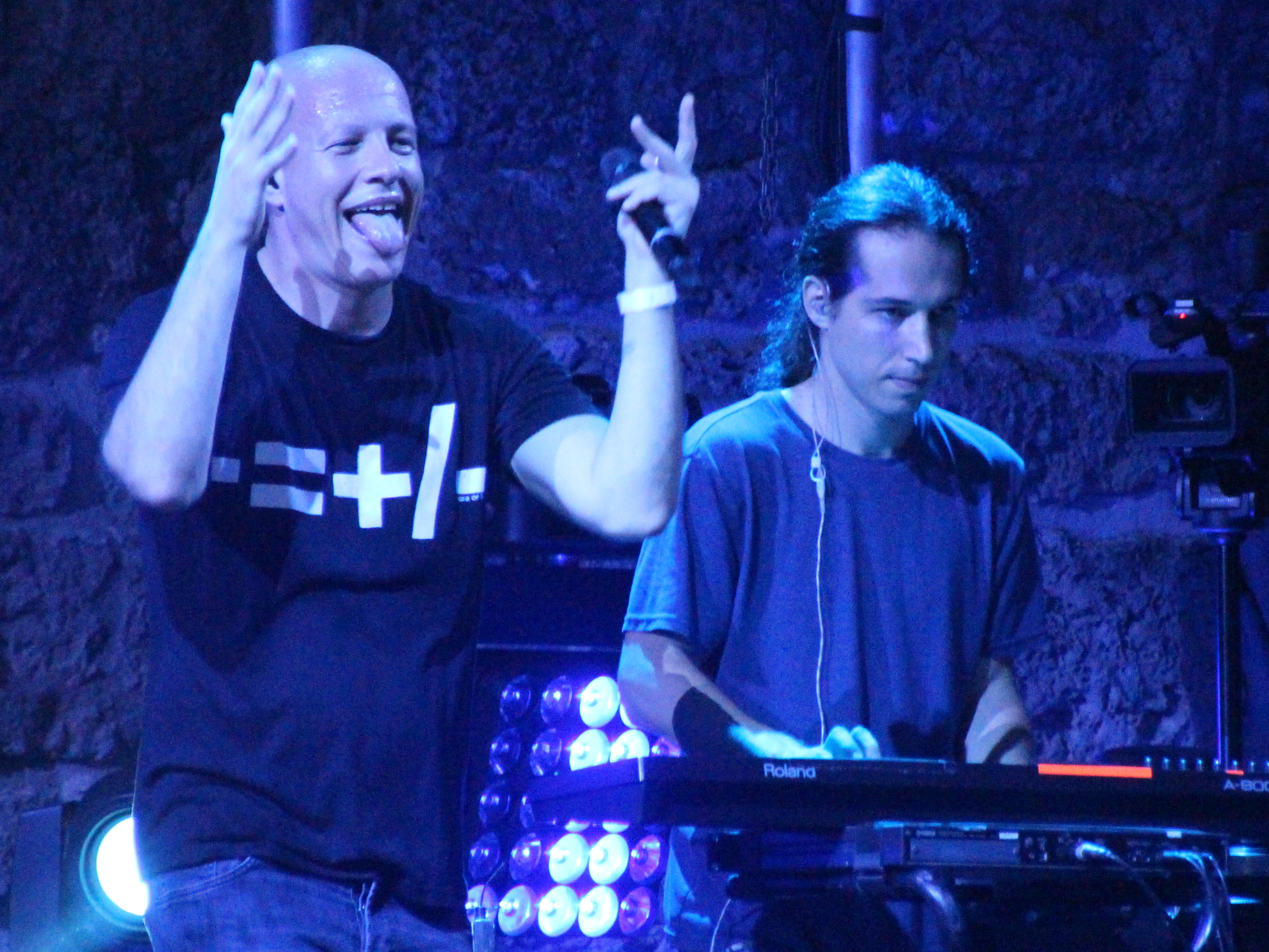
Infected Mushroom during their show in Amphi Shuni, September 2015.

The band's album, Army of Mushrooms, was released on 8 May 2012 on the Dim Mak Records label. It features tracks influenced by the psychedelic trance, dubstep, house and drum and bass genres, such as the up-tempo, breakbeat track "The Rat". The album includes a cover of "The Pretender" by the Foo Fighters, the progressive heavy-hitter "Drum n' Bassa" and "Nation of Wusses"—released as a single on 3 April 2012—and "U R So Fucked", released as a single/video on 14 February 2012.

A large-scale North American tour was launched on 12 May 2012, called "The Unveiling", and featured revamped stage production and novel audio/visual live aspects. The new live production featured Erez and Duvdev within two specially designed hollow spheres placed on stage, among other high tech additions to the band's live set-up and multimedia backdrop.

January 2013 saw the duo embark on their FungusAmongUS tour across North America, with special guests The M Machine. The "FungusAmongUS" tour was designed by Vita Motus and V Squared Labs, the creators of Amon Tobin's ISAM production and Skrillex's live Cell production.

The duo released a collaborative EP named Friends on Mushrooms Vol. 1 in January 2013, again under Dim Mak Records. The EP consists of tracks featuring Astrix and Hatikva 6. In July 2013, the duo released Friends on Mushrooms Vol. 2, also under Dim Mak Records, which consisted of collaborations with Pegboard Nerds, Savant and Kelsy Karter. In mid-2013, Infected Mushroom embarked on a tour in support of the Vol. 2 release that featured the duo "set against an incredible three dimensional landscape that brings INFECTED MUSHROOM's visual and sonic journey to life."

In August 2013, due to the leaked song "Aura", Infected Mushroom was revealed as a production team on Lady Gaga's third studio album Artpop. Friends on Mushrooms Vol. 3 was released on 17 June 2014 and includes a collaboration with Savant.

On 1 April 2014, Duvdevani said that Infected Mushroom will be releasing a new album at the end of the year. It was later revealed that Infected Mushroom will in fact be releasing a compilation of the tracks from the Friends On Mushrooms extended plays, bundled together with two new tracks, "Kafkaf" and "Kazabubu". This was released on 6 January 2015.

=== 2015–2018: Converting Vegetarians II, Return to the Sauce, and Monstercat ===
Animatronica (Converting Vegetarians II)
Audio clip of "Animatronica" by Infected Mushroom from the album Converting Vegetarians II

Following their Animatronica tour, the band officially announced that their new album will be a follow-up to their widely acclaimed 2003 album Converting Vegetarians. It was also announced that the vocals of Sasha Grey will be featured on the track "Fields of Grey". The album was released on 11 September 2015.

On 27 January 2017, the band released their eleventh studio album, Return to the Sauce, which features their signature psy-trance sound. This is in stark contrast to Converting Vegetarians II, which is more ambient and down-tempo in style. The release of Return to the Sauce was preceded by two singles, "Liquid Smoke" and "Nutmeg".

On 24 November 2017, the band released their single Spitfire on the Canadian independent record label Monstercat.

=== 2018–present: IM21 Pt.1 and Monstercat albums ===
On 9 March 2018, the band released IM21, Pt.1 under the label Hommega. It is composed of remixes of "Bust a Move", "Suliman", "Saeed", "Yamakas in space", and an acoustic live remix of "i-Wish". These were remixed by groups such as Bliss, No Comment, Paranormal Attack and Modulation. The acoustic remix of "i-Wish" was done by the band itself.

On 30 October 2018, the band announced a new full-length album titled Head of NASA and the 2 Amish Boys. The album was released through Monstercat on 12 December that same year. There are seven tracks on the album which are mainly electronic with psytrance influences and include one hip-hop collaboration song with Israeli artist Tuna and Israeli girl band A-WA in Hebrew, Arabic and English – Lost in Space.

In 2020, the group released their 12th album More Than Just a Name. It features collaborations with Astrix and Bliss. The track Infected Megamix features a montage of past popular Infected Mushroom songs.

On July 7, 2022, Infected Mushroom released the single "A Cookie from Space", announced to be the first single from their 25-year anniversary album, IM25.

In October 2023 Infected Mushroom released the single "Tirkod LaNezach" (תרקוד לנצח, lit. "Dance Forever") alongside the Israeli singer Omer Adam, dedicated to the victims of the Supernova music festival massacre.

In 2025, the psytrance scene became entangled in broader entertainment-industry boycott campaigns linked to Israel's war in Gaza. Australia's Earth Frequency Festival dropped Infected Mushroom from its lineup following a grassroots pressure campaign, which also contributed to a wave of cancellations across the act's wider Australian tour.

A new album called IM30 was released on January 30, 2026, following the singles "Lightweight", "What You Know You Know You Know" and "LA Beast".

== Touring ==
On average, the band completes 120 live annual performances, including the Ultra Music Festival in Miami, US; the Virgin Festival in Baltimore, US; Mexico's OMIX; California, US' Coachella Valley Music and Arts Festival; Brazil's Ipanema Beach; Melbourne, Australia's Metro Club; and the 2009, 2011, 2014, 2016, 2018, 2022 and 2024 Burning Man Festivals in Black Rock City, Nevada, US. Infected Mushroom have been twice ranked among the world's "10 Best DJ's" by readers of U.K.'s DJ Magazine.

== Discography ==
- The Gathering (1999)
- Classical Mushroom (2000)
- B.P. Empire (2001)
- Converting Vegetarians (2003)
- IM the Supervisor (2004)
- Vicious Delicious (2007)
- Legend of the Black Shawarma (2009)
- Army of Mushrooms (2012)
- Friends on Mushrooms (2013 - 2015)
- Converting Vegetarians II (2015)
- Return to the Sauce (2017)
- Head of NASA and the 2 Amish Boys (2018)
- More than Just a Name (2020)
- IM25 (2022)
- Reborn (2024)
- IM30 (2026)
