= Diane Webber =

American actress (1932-2008)

Marguerite Empey
- Webber in 1955

Playboy centerfold appearance
- May 1955; February 1956
- Preceded by: Marilyn Waltz (April 1955); Lynn Turner (January 1956)
- Succeeded by: Eve Meyer (June 1955); Marian Stafford (March 1956)

Personal details
- Born: July 29, 1932 Los Angeles, California, US
- Died: August 19, 2008 (aged 76) Los Angeles, California, US

Marguerite Diane Webber (born Marguerite Empey; July 29, 1932 – August 19, 2008) was an American model, dancer, actress and nudist.

== Early life ==
Webber was born in Hollywood, Los Angeles, on July 29, 1932, to Marguerite Empey (née Andrus), a Hollywood actress and former Miss Long Beach beauty contest winner, and Arthur Guy Empey, a writer and veteran of World War I. She received her formal education at Hollywood High School. As a child, she received ballet lessons from Russian ballerina Maria Bekefi.

== Modeling career ==
In the early 1950s, while developing her professional modeling career, she found employment as a chorus girl at Bimbo's 365 Club in San Francisco. As the decade progressed, she modeled for many professional photographers, including Peter Gowland, Bunny Yeager and Keith Bernard, appearing in a myriad of men's magazines, such as Esquire, and commercial advertising imagery.

== Playmate of the Month ==
Under the name Marguerite Empey, she was Playboy magazine's Playmate of the Month in both May 1955 and February 1956. The photo shoot for the 1956 publication was shot by Russ Meyer. When she posed for Playboy the second time, Hugh Hefner didn't even recognize her as a Playmate from the previous year.

== Album covers and film ==
Webber appeared on the cover art of several pop music vinyl record albums in the late 1950s-1970s, including George Shearing's Satin Brass (1959), Cliff Ferre Looks Like Fun, Les Baxter's La Femme (1956) and Jewels of the Sea (1961), Los Mambolocos' "Mambo" (1974), Nelson Riddle's Sea of Dreams (1958), Marty Paich's Jazz for Relaxation (1956), Xavier Cugat's Chilie con Cugie (1959), Otto Cesana's Sheer Ecstasy (1960) and the R.C.A. Japanese release of Seiji Hiraoka & His Quartet's Bedtime Music (1965).

During the 1960s, Adam magazine released several albums entitled Stag Party Record. Webber appeared on the 10th edition which was called Off Limits.

In the 1960s and 1970s, she appeared in the movie Mermaids of Tiburon (1962), and an episode of the television series Voyage to the Bottom of the Sea entitled "The Mermaid" (1967). She also appeared in the film The Trial of Billy Jack (1974).

== Nudism ==
In the mid to late 1960s, as a part of the counter-culture movement in the United States, Webber became involved with nudism and appeared in numerous nudist publications advocating the lifestyle, such as Naked and Together: The Wonderful Webbers by June Lange (1967). In 1965, she traveled to Sioux City to give evidence at the request of a District Attorney's Office in a court trial involving the sending of allegedly obscene nudist publications into the State of Iowa. However, when taking the witness stand, instead of proving the prosecution's case, she gave a spirited defense of the principles of the naked lifestyle.

== Middle-Eastern dance ==
From 1969 to 1980, Webber's professional career was as a bellydancing instructor at the now defunct Everywoman's Village in Van Nuys, California. She occasionally performed this dance accompanied by some of her better students to the accompaniment of Middle-Eastern music in public places in and around Los Angeles. She founded Perfumes of Araby, one of the first Middle-Eastern dance companies in the United States. Webber's dancing shows were sensual but didn't pander to a male audience, with women and children often attending the performances. For several years, she led and coordinated these outdoor shows, with up to forty performers taking part.

== Cultural references ==
Her iconic status among Playboy models is referenced in Gay Talese's non-fiction book Thy Neighbor's Wife (1980). Talese had published an extensive article in the August 1975 issue of Esquire, in which Webber is considered an object of fantasy as well as an actual person. Two nude photos of her appear in the article, and one is on the cover.

== Personal life ==
In her final years, Webber was a librarian and archivist for a law firm in Santa Monica.

She married Joseph Webber in 1955 (the marriage ended with a divorce in 1986), from which came a son named John (born 1956).

Webber died on August 19, 2008, in Los Angeles, following complications from surgery for cancer. She was 76.

== Filmography ==
- This Is My Body (1960, Short) – Herself
- Mermaids of Tiburon (1962) – Mermaid Queen
- The Swinger (1966) – Model No. 12 (uncredited)
- The Witchmaker (1969) – The Nautch of Tangier
- Sinthia, the Devil's Doll (1970) – The Housewife
- The Blue Hour (1971) – Belly Dancer
- The Trial of Billy Jack (1974) – Belly-Dance Instructor (final film role)

== Notable TV guest appearances ==
- Peter Gunn (February 16, 1959) (Season 1 Episode 21: "Scuba") – Midge
- Highway Patrol (February 1959) (Season 4 Episode 18: "Coptor Cave-In") Woman
- Markham (June 1959) (Season 1 Episode 8: "The Glass Diamond") Valerie
- Bold Venture (August 1959) (Season 1 Episode 3: "Mama George's Horse's Hat") – Latin dancer (along with Kathy Kelly and Lisa Gaye)
- Alfred Hitchcock Presents (May 2, 1961) (Season 6 Episode 29: "The Pearl Necklace") – The Other Woman
- Voyage to the Bottom of the Sea (January 29, 1967) (Season 3 Episode 19: "The Mermaid") – Mermaid
- The Stanley Siegel Show (1981) – as herself, discussing belly dancing

== See also ==
- List of people in Playboy 1953–1959

Bettie Page	Jayne Mansfield	(no Playmate)	Marilyn Waltz	Marguerite Empey	Eve Meyer
Janet Pilgrim	Pat Lawler	Anne Fleming	Jean Moorhead	Barbara Cameron	Janet Pilgrim

Lynn Turner	Marguerite Empey	Marian Stafford	Rusty Fisher	Marion Scott	Gloria Walker
Alice Denham	Jonnie Nicely	Elsa Sørensen	Janet Pilgrim	Betty Blue	Lisa Winters
