= Jewels of the Sea =

- Cover of Jewels of the Sea original vinyl release featuring Diane Webber.

Studio album by Les Baxter
- Released: 1961
- Genres: Exotica, lounge
- Label: Capitol ST 1537

Les Baxter chronology
Alakazam the Great film score (1961)	Jewels of the Sea (1961)	Master of the World film score (1961)

Jewels of the Sea is a 1961 orchestral exotica album by American composer Les Baxter. The album was inspired by fantasy ideas of the ocean from pop culture, such as mermaids and sea nymphs, sunken ships, and legendary underwater cities such as Atlantis. There was an overall erotic element to the album, whose tagline was "Titillating Orchestrations for Listening and Loving", and whose original cover featured actress and model Diane Webber smiling glamorously underwater, apparently naked. Although not explicitly shown wearing a mermaid tail, her makeup and jewellery are styled to be reminiscent of the performing mermaids at Weeki Wachee Springs.

Musically, Jewels of the Sea is characteristic of Baxter's work, with its use of a traditional European orchestra, primarily percussion instruments and strings, combined with more exotic instruments such as electronic keyboard and electric organ. All tracks are original compositions with the exception of "The Enchanted Sea", an arrangement of Claude Debussy's La mer. The mood of the album ranges from upbeat to melancholy, with an overall relaxing effect.

The album was generally well-received by critics. Electronics World called the oceanic theme "pure corn", but the music "first rate." Frank Arganbright of the Journal & Courier called it "sparkling to say the least." Merrill McCord of The Courier-Journal called it a "concert-like spectacular." The Virgin Encyclopedia of Fifties Music rated it three stars out of four.

== Track list ==
Adapted from the liner notes of the CD reissue of Jewels of the Sea, track lengths from iTunes. All tracks composed, arranged, and conducted by Les Baxter unless noted. The original vinyl recording consisted of twelve tracks. When the album was reissued on audio CD in 2012 by él, fifteen bonus tracks drawn from three other Baxter albums were added as bonus material.

No.	Title	Length
1.	"Sunken City"	3:00
2.	"Stars in the Sand"	3:15
3.	"Sea Nymph"	2:06
4.	"Singing Sea Shells"	2:17
5.	"Dolphin"	2:00
6.	"Dawn Under the Sea"	2:32
7.	"The Enchanted Sea" (Adapted from La mer by Claude Debussy)	3:33
8.	"The Girl from Nassau"	2:26
9.	"The Ancient Galleon"	3:18
10.	"Coral Castle"	2:38
11.	"Dancing Diamonds"	1:34
12.	"Jewels of the Sea" (Adapted from "Katia's Theme" by Roberto Nicolosi, from the motion picture Black Sunday)	3:48

Selections from The Sacred Idol
No.	Title	Length
13.	"Procession of the Princes"
14.	"Fruit of Dreams"
15.	"Pool of Love"
16.	"Gardens of the Moon"
17.	"Pyramid of the Sun"
18.	"The High Priest of the Aztecs"
19.	"Acapulco"

Selections from Ports of Pleasure
No.	Title	Length
20.	"Tahiti: A Summer Night at Sea"
21.	"Hong Kong Cable Car"
22.	"Tramp Steamer to Singapore"
23.	"Monkey Dance of Bali"
24.	"City of Veils"

Selections from Tamboo!
No.	Title	Length
25.	"Cuchibamba"
26.	"Oasis of Dakhla"
27.	"Batumba"
