= Samuel Hoffman =

Samuel J. Hoffman (July 23, 1903 in New York City – December 6, 1967 in Los Angeles) was a notable thereminist.

== Biography ==
At age 14, began playing the violin professionally in New York City, leading nightclub and society bands under the stage name Hal Hope. In the early 1930s, he acquired a 1929 RCA theremin in payment of a debt, and in 1936, he had formed a nine-piece swing orchestra in which he played both violin and theremin. Later, he formed Hal Hope’s Electronic Trio, which featured Hoffman and his theremin along with a Hammond organ and a theremin-fingerboard electric cello.

Hoffman became a podiatrist and relocated his practice to Los Angeles in 1941 and registered with American Federation of Musicians Local 47 to pick up occasional music jobs. In 1944, composer Miklos Rozsa decided he wanted to use a theremin in the orchestral score of Alfred Hitchcock's 1945 film Spellbound, he contacted Hoffman, the only thereminist listed in the union register who could read music. The same year, Rozsa enlisted Hoffman's theremin playing in his score for The Lost Weekend. Both scores received nominations for Academy Award for Best Original Score, and the score for Spellbound won. In the wake of the success of Spellbound, Hoffman was asked to play theremin on several other horror and noir soundtracks in the late 1940s, including The Spiral Staircase (1946), The Red House (1947), and Impact (1949). He also performed on the soundtrack of the Bing Crosby/Bob Hope comedy Road to Rio (1947).

Hoffman began performing under his real name; he was customarily referred to as "Doctor" due to his profession. In 1947, Hoffman collaborated with bandleader Les Baxter and Harry Revel to record Music Out of the Moon, which is considered the best-selling theremin record of all time. The following year, Baxter, Revel, and Hoffman regrouped to record the Corday Perfume-sponsored and fragrance-themed album Perfume Set To Music, which reached number 1 on the Variety chart that December. In 1950, Revel and Hoffman teamed up with Billy May for a third album, Music For Peace Of Mind. These albums were forerunners to exotica and space age pop; they also influenced Sun Ra, who recorded a composition from Perfume Set to Music on his first LP, Jazz by Sun Ra.

In 1950, Hoffman played on his first science fiction film soundtrack, Rocketship X-M. Soundtrack work for several other science fiction films followed, including The Thing from Another World (1951) and The Day The Earth Stood Still, whose music would be used as the title theme for the pilot episode of the TV Series Lost in Space, as well as in various episodes of Voyage to the Bottom of the Sea.

Hoffman also made a number of TV show appearances, including on You Asked for It, Truth or Consequences, The Mickey Mouse Club, and The Johnny Carson Show.

Hoffman died of a heart attack on December 6, 1967. One of his last recordings was Safe as Milk by Captain Beefheart and his Magic Band, where he appeared on two tracks.

Post mortem, Samuel Hoffman's original RCA theremin was purchased by Peter Pringle from Hoffman's family, as stated by Pringle in many videos in which he plays the instrument.

== Discography ==
=== Studio albums ===
- Music Out of the Moon (1947)
- Perfume Set to Music (1948)
- Music for Peace of Mind (1949)

These albums are compiled and remastered in Waves in the Ether: The Magical World of the Theremin (2004).

=== Soundtracks ===
- Spellbound (1945)
- The Lost Weekend (1945)
- The Spiral Staircase (1945)
- The Red House (1947)
- The Pretender (1947)
- Road to Rio (1947)
- Raw Deal (1948)
- Let's Live a Little (1948)
- Impact (1949)
- She Shoulda Said No! (1949)
- Oriental Evil (1950)
- Rocketship X-M (1950)
- Fancy Pants (1950)
- Let's Dance (1950)
- The Thing from Another World (1951)
- The Day the Earth Stood Still (1951)
- Phantom from Space (1953)
- It Came from Outer Space (1953)
- The 5,000 Fingers of Dr. T. (1953)
- Project Moon Base (1953)
- The Mad Magician (1954)
- Day the World Ended (1955)
- Please Murder Me (1956)
- The Ten Commandments (1956)
- Our Mr. Sun (1956)
- Voodoo Island (1957)
- The Delicate Delinquent (1957)
- Earth vs. the Spider (1958)
- Billy the Kid versus Dracula (1966)
