= Music Out of the Moon =

Music Out of the Moon: Music Unusual Featuring the Theremin - Themes by Harry Revel

Studio album by Les Baxter & Harry Revel with Dr. Samuel J. Hoffman
- Released: April 1947
- Genre: Space age pop; proto-exotica; jazz; lounge; easy listening; light music
- Length: 18:12
- Label: Capitol

Samuel Hoffman chronology
Music Out of the Moon: Music Unusual Featuring the Theremin - Themes by Harry Revel (1947)	Perfume Set to Music (1948)

Les Baxter chronology
Music Out of the Moon (1947)	Perfume Set to Music (1948)

Professional ratings
Review scores
Source	Rating
Allmusic	4.5/5 stars
Allmusic	3/5 stars

Music Out of the Moon: Music Unusual Featuring the Theremin - Themes by Harry Revel (Capitol CC-47) is an album consisting of six songs on three 10-inch, 78 rpm records by bandleader Les Baxter and composer Harry Revel with theremin player Dr. Samuel J. Hoffman released on Capitol in April 1947. Music Out of the Moon is considered the best-selling theremin record of all time.

== Music ==
The music was a mixture of late 1940s lounge jazz and film music underpinned by Hoffman's otherworldly theremin playing. According to the liner notes: "Harry Revel created the basic "idea" and themes while Leslie Baxter, conductor and arranger, has given them appropriately unique tone color, using mass harmonies of human voices as well as unusual instrumental effects with woodwinds, strings and bass; some without rhythm, others with a dominant, demanding beat."

== Cover ==
Music Out of the Moon was noteworthy for being one of the first albums to feature a full color cover – a risqué photograph by Paul Garrison of partially clothed actress Virginia Clark of the Earl Carroll Theatre, Hollywood, sprawled across a bed – which made it stand out in an era of monochrome album packaging.

== Reissues ==
Music Out of the Moon was reissued by Capitol in 1950 on one 10-inch, 33⅓ rpm disc (Capitol H-2000).

In 1954, Music Out of the Moon was combined with Music for Peace of Mind -- a six-song 1950 collaboration between Billy May, Revel and Hoffman -- on one 12-inch, 33⅓ rpm disc (Capitol T390).

In 1999, Basta reissued Music Out of the Moon on a CD called Dr. Samuel J. Hoffman and the Theremin, which also included Perfume Set to Music (1948) and Music for Peace of Mind (1950). In 2004, Rev-Ola issued the same three albums on a CD called Waves in the Ether: The Magical World of the Theremin.

== Played in space by Neil Armstrong ==
The Hollywood producer Mickey Kapp compiled a cassette tape of tracks from the album for astronaut Neil Armstrong, who brought the tape on the Apollo 11 Moon mission in 1969. He played it from the Apollo spacecraft on a Sony TC-50 during the flight back from the Moon when it was about 150,000 nautical miles (280,000 km) from Earth, and explained, "That's an old favorite of mine, about – It's an album made about 20 years ago, called Music Out of the Moon." (NASA audio recording) The record appears in First Man, the 2018 biopic of Armstrong directed by Damien Chazelle.

== Track listing (CC-47) ==
Track listing and sides
Track	Song title
A.	Lunar Rhapsody
B	Moon Moods
C.	Lunette
D.	Celestial Nocturne
E.	Mist O’ The Moon
F.	Radar Blues
