= Fly Me to the Moon =

1954 song by Bart Howard

"In Other Words"
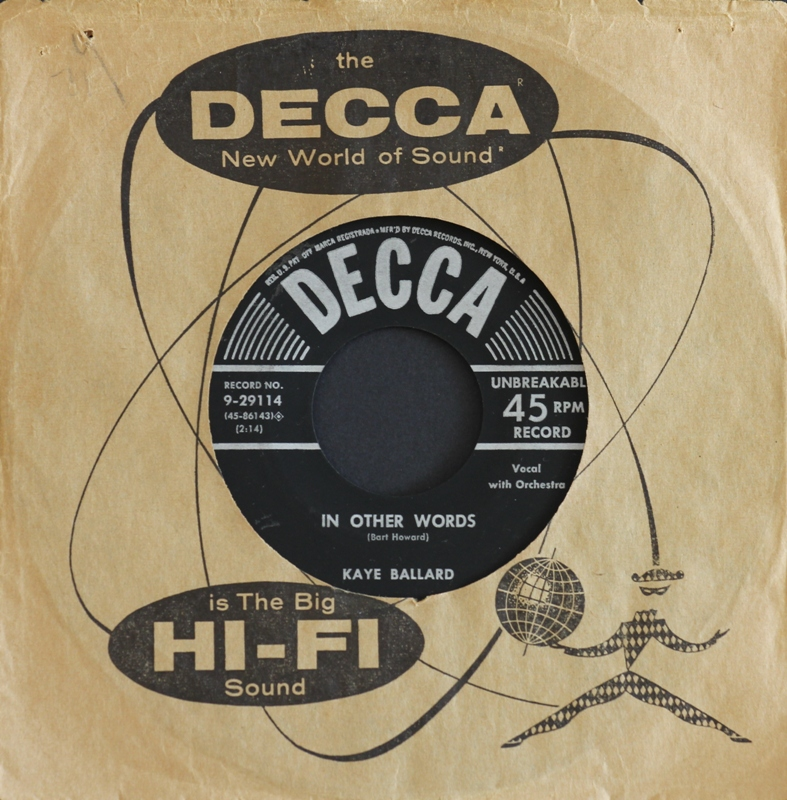
- First recording, titled "In Other Words"

Song by Kaye Ballard
- Released: April 1954
- Recorded: 1954
- Genre: Jazz
- Length: 2:14
- Label: Decca
- Songwriter: Bart Howard

"Fly Me to the Moon", originally titled "In Other Words", is a song written in 1954 by Bart Howard. The first recording of the song was made in 1954 by Kaye Ballard. Frank Sinatra's 1964 version was closely associated with the Apollo missions to the Moon.

In 1999, the Songwriters Hall of Fame honored "Fly Me to the Moon" by inducting it as a "Towering Song". In 2026, Ballard's version was selected by the Library of Congress for preservation in the National Recording Registry for its "cultural, historical or aesthetic importance in the nation's recorded sound heritage." In June 2026, CBS News included the song in its list of the 250 essential American songs of the past 250 years.

== Background and composition ==
In 1954, when "Fly Me to the Moon" was first presented to the public, Bart Howard had been pursuing a career in music for over 20 years. He played piano to accompany cabaret singers, but also wrote songs with Cole Porter, his idol, in mind. In the book Intimate Nights: The Golden Age of New York Cabaret James Gavin noted that Howard wrote the song "in response to his publisher's plea for a simpler song: why did he have to write such grandiloquent lyrics? 'In Other Words' talked about the verbosity of poets who 'use many words to say a simple thing'; 'hold my hand,' 'Kiss me.'" In response, Howard wrote a cabaret ballad. A publisher tried to make him change some words from "fly me to the Moon" to "take me to the Moon," but Howard refused. Many years later Howard commented that "... it took me 20 years to find out how to write a song in 20 minutes."

He used his position as a piano accompanist and presenter at the Blue Angel cabaret venue to promote the song, and it was soon introduced in cabaret performances by Felicia Sanders.

The song was composed in 3/4 time signature but was changed to 4/4 by Quincy Jones in his arrangement for Frank Sinatra.

== Early recordings ==
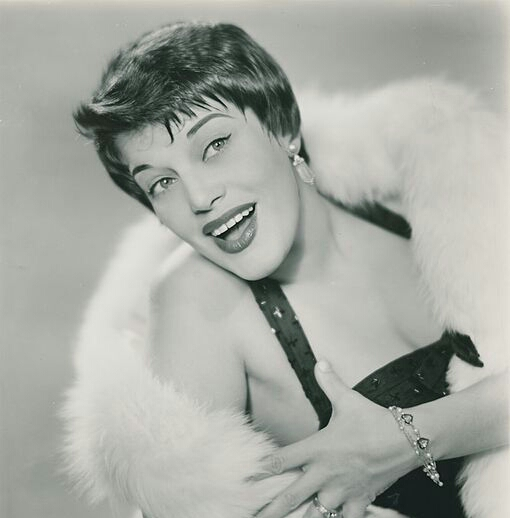
Kaye Ballard circa late 1950s

Kaye Ballard made the song's first commercial recording, released by Decca in April 1954. A brief review published on May 8, 1954, in Billboard said that "In Other Words" was "...a love song sung with feeling by Miss Ballard." This recording was released as the flipside of "Lazy Afternoon", which Kaye Ballard was currently performing as star of the stage show The Golden Apple.

Over the next few years, jazz and cabaret singers released cover versions of "In Other Words" on EP or LP record albums, including Chris Connor, Johnny Mathis, Portia Nelson, and Nancy Wilson. Eydie Gormé sang the song on her 1958 album Eydie In Love (under the title "In Other Words"), which reached No. 20 in the Cashbox Album Charts.

== Subsequent recordings and uses ==
In 1960, Peggy Lee released the song on the album Pretty Eyes, then made it more popular when she performed it in front of a large television audience on The Ed Sullivan Show. As the song's popularity increased, it became better known as "Fly Me to the Moon", and in 1963 Peggy Lee convinced Bart Howard to make the name change official. Connie Francis released two non-English versions of the song in 1963: in Italian as "Portami Con Te" and in Spanish as "Llévame a la Luna".

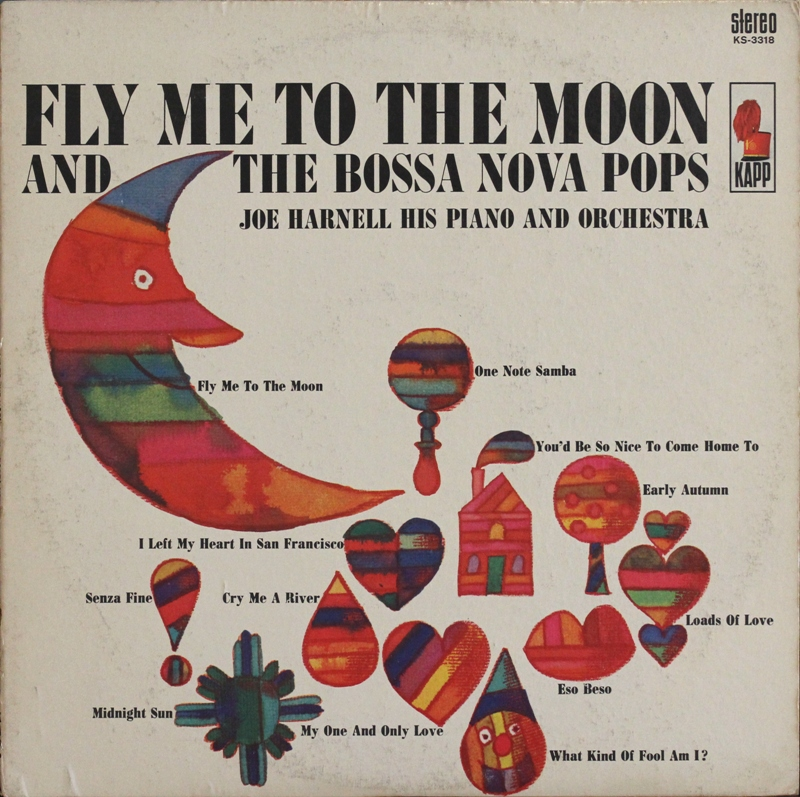
Fly Me to the Moon Bossa Nova 1963 album by Joe Harnell

In 1962, Joe Harnell arranged and recorded an instrumental version in a bossa nova style. It was released as a single in late 1962. Harnell's version spent 13 weeks on the Billboard Hot 100 chart, reaching No. 14 on February 23, 1963, while reaching No. 4 on Billboard's Middle-Road Singles chart. It reached No. 30 in Canada. Harnell's version was ranked No. 89 on Billboard's end of year ranking "Top Records of 1963". Harnell's recording won him a Grammy Award at the 5th Annual Grammy Awards for Best Performance by an Orchestra – for Dancing. His version was included on his album Fly Me to the Moon and the Bossa Nova Pops released in early 1963, which reached No. 3 stereo album on the Billboard Top LPs chart.

Frank Sinatra included the song on his 1964 album It Might as Well Be Swing, accompanied by Count Basie. The music for this album was arranged by Quincy Jones, who had worked with Count Basie a year earlier on the album This Time by Basie, which also included a version of "Fly Me to the Moon". Will Friedwald commented that "Jones boosted the tempo and put it into an even four/four" for Basie's version, but "when Sinatra decided to address it with the Basie/Jones combination they recharged it into a straight swinger... [which]...all but explodes with energy". Bart Howard estimated that by the time Frank Sinatra covered the song in 1964, more than 100 other versions had been recorded.

Bobby Womack recorded a version that was released in 1968 on Minit Records, from his album Fly Me to the Moon. His rendition reached No. 52 on the Billboard Hot 100 and No. 16 on the R&B chart. Occasionally on the CBS series WKRP in Cincinnati, an instrumental sampling of "Fly Me To The Moon" was used as a doorbell melody during scenes taking place in the apartment of character Jennifer Marlowe.

By 1995, the song had been recorded more than 300 times. According to a poll conducted by Japanese music magazine CD&DL Data in 2016, the cover versions by Claire Littley and Yoko Takahashi – which were used alternately for the end credits of Neon Genesis Evangelion, were rated highly within the country, with Littley's version also winning an award at the 2019 Heisei Anisong Grand Prix as one of the best anime theme songs of the 1990s.

Richard Simmons's last words were a loose paraphrase of the song's lyrics.

== NASA association ==
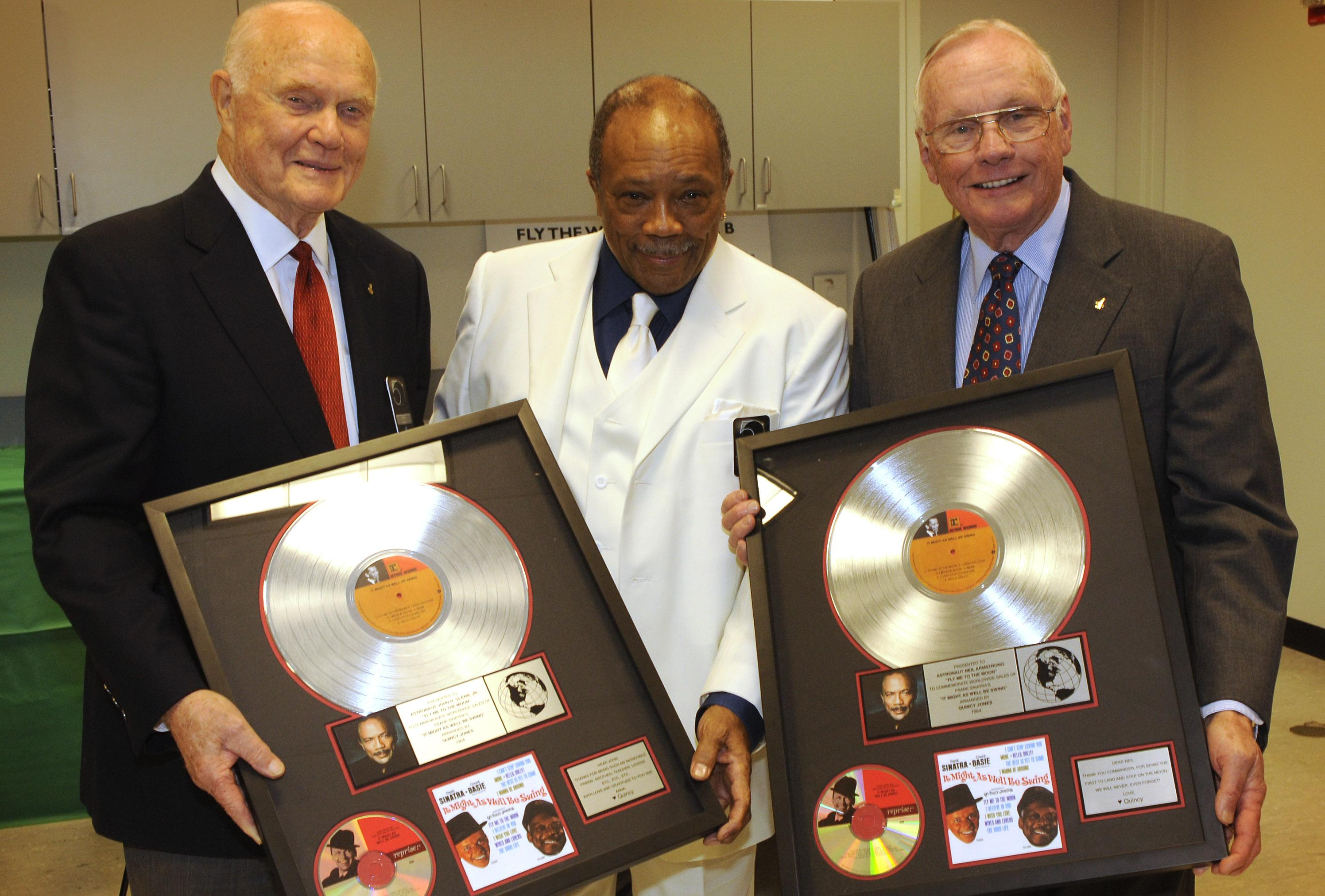
Quincy Jones presents platinum copies of Frank Sinatra's album to Senator John Glenn and Apollo 11 Commander Neil Armstrong

Frank Sinatra's 1964 recording of "Fly Me to the Moon" became closely associated with NASA's Apollo space program. A copy of the song was played on a Sony TC-50 portable cassette player on the Apollo 10 mission which orbited the Moon, and also on Apollo 11 before the first landing on the Moon. The song's association with Apollo 11 was reprised many years later when Diana Krall sang it at the mission's 40th anniversary commemoration ceremony, and also for mission commander Neil Armstrong's memorial service in 2012.

== Certifications ==
=== Frank Sinatra's version ===
Region	Certification	Certified units/sales
Denmark (IFPI Danmark)	Platinum	90,000^{‡}
Italy (FIMI)	Gold	35,000^{‡}
New Zealand (RMNZ)	Platinum	30,000^{‡}
Spain (Promusicae)	Platinum	60,000^{‡}
United Kingdom (BPI)	Platinum	600,000^{‡}
^{‡} Sales+streaming figures based on certification alone.
