= The Forum (vocal group) =

American vocal group

- Origin: United States
- Genres: Folk rock, Pop
- Years active: 1966 - 1968
- Labels: Mira
- Past members: Phil Campos; Rene Nole; Riselle Bain

The Forum was a vocal group organized by Les Baxter whose members were Phil Campos, Riselle Bain and Rene Nole who would marry Campos.

The group evolved from an earlier folk music group called Les Baxter's Balladeers. Campos, Bain and Nole split off into The Forum in 1966 as part of the folk rock craze. They had one hit record in 1967 on Mira Records with "The River Is Wide".

== Background ==
Their debut release was with "The River Is Wide", released in 1966 on the Penthouse label. It didn't make any significant progress. It was later re-mastered and re-edited, and was released a second time in early 1967 on the Mira label. Nothing happened the second time around either. Then Decca issued it in the UK on their London label. After that, the record began to make some progress in the UK. This got the attention of a DJ in Seattle. He started playing it and it attracted some attention in the Seattle area. By July 1967, the record was at no. 88 in the Billboard charts. It finally got to no. 45.

In 1967, they released an album called The River Is Wide. The group eventually folded, and Campos and his wife formed a duo.

In December 1968, a group billed as Phil Campos & the Forum were in Nevada, appearing at the Carson City Nugget. Around April 1969, Campos and the Forum were appearing at the Theatre Lounge of the Carson City Nugget six nights a week. The Reno Gazette-Journal in their April 26, 1969 issue reported on the group's performance at the Carson Nugget. Campos's handling of songs such as "He's Got the Whole World in His Hands" and "Sailor Man, Where You Gonna Run To?" were noted.

Phil Campos died in 1987.

== Discography ==
List of singles
| Title | Catalogue | Year | Notes |
|---|---|---|---|
| "The River Is Wide" / " Fall In Love (All Over Again)" | Penthouse PH-504 | 1966 | Released Aug 1966 |
| "The River Is Wide" / "I Fall In Love (All Over Again)" | Mira 232 | 1966 | Released Dec 1966 |
| "The River Is Wide" / "Girl Without A Boy" | Mira 232 | 1967 | |
| "Trip On Me" / "It's Sunday" | Mira 243 | 1967 | |
| "Girl Without A Boy" / "Go Try To Put Out The Sun" | Mira 248 | 1968 | |

Albums
| Title | Release info | Year | F | Notes |
|---|---|---|---|---|
| The River Is Wide | Mira Records MLP 3014 | 1967 | LP | Issued in stereo on MLPS 3014 |
| The River Is Wide | Rev-Ola Cr Rev 14 | 2002 | CD | |
| The River Is Wide | Gear Fab Records RGF-002a | 2006 | LP | |
