= Marian Stafford =

American actress (1931–1984)

Playboy centerfold appearance
- March 1956
- Preceded by: Marguerite Empey
- Succeeded by: Rusty Fisher

Personal details
- Born: February 7, 1931; Houston, Texas, U.S.
- Died: August 16, 1984 (aged 53)
- Height: 5 ft 3 in (160 cm)

Marian Stafford (February 7, 1931 – August 16, 1984) was an American actress and model. She was Playboy magazine's Playmate of the Month for the March 1956 issue. Her centerfold was photographed by Ruth Sondak, and was the first to consist of three pages.

In addition to posing for other men's magazines in the decade, Stafford became a popular personality during the so-called Golden Age of Television. She was a regular on game shows such as Treasure Hunt and The $64,000 Question. She was crowned Miss Color TV of 1956 by NBC.

Stafford died on August 16, 1984, at the age of 53.

Lynn Turner	Marguerite Empey	Marian Stafford	Rusty Fisher	Marion Scott	Gloria Walker
Alice Denham	Jonnie Nicely	Elsa Sørensen	Janet Pilgrim	Betty Blue	Lisa Winters
