= Skins! Bongo Party with Les Baxter =

Studio album by Les Baxter's Drums
- Released: 1957
- Genre: Easy listening, exotica
- Length: 30:46
- Label: Capitol T 774

Les Baxter's Drums chronology
Caribbean Moonlight (1956)	Skins! Bongo Party with Les Baxter (1957)	'Round the World with Les Baxter (1957)

Skins! Bongo Party with Les Baxter is an album by Les Baxter's Drums. It was released in 1957 on Capitol Records.

The album debuted on Billboard magazine's popular albums chart on March 16, 1957, peaked at No. 21, and remained on that chart for two weeks.

== Track listing ==
Side 1

1. "Afro-Desia" (Les Baxter)
2. "Brazilian Bash" (Les Baxter)
3. "Bustin' the Bongos" (Dave Dexter)
4. "Conversation" (Les Baxter)
5. "Poppin' Panderos" (Les Baxter)

Side 2

1. "Talkin' Drums" (Les Baxter)
2. "Reverberasia" (Les Baxter)
3. "Shoutin' Drums" (Les Baxter)
4. "Gringo" (Les Baxter)
5. "Mood Tattooed" (Lex Baxter)
