= Treasure Hunt (American game show) =

- Also known as: (The New) Treasure Hunt
- Created by: Jan Murray (1956–1959); Chuck Barris (1973–1982)
- Directed by: John Dorsey
- Presented by: Jan Murray; Geoff Edwards
- Announcer: Johnny Jacobs; Tony McClay
- Country of origin: United States
- No. of seasons: 1970s syn.: 4; 1980s syn.: 1
- No. of episodes: 1970s syn.: 122; 1980s syn.: 85

Production
- Running time: 30 minutes
- Production companies: Jantone Productions (1956–1959); Chuck Barris Productions (1973–1977, 1981–1982)

Original release
- Network: ABC Primetime
- Release: September 7, 1956 – May 31, 1957
- Network: NBC Daytime
- Release: August 12, 1957 – December 4, 1959
- Network: NBC Primetime
- Release: December 24, 1957 – June 17, 1958
- Network: Syndication
- Release: September 10, 1973 – September 11, 1977
- Release: September 14, 1981 – March 12, 1982

Treasure Hunt, also known as The New Treasure Hunt during its 1970s run, is an American television game show that aired throughout the 1950s, 1970s, and 1980s. In the show, contestants selected a mystery package (originally a treasure chest, later a gift box) in the hopes of winning cash or prizes.

== 1950s version (Treasure Hunt) ==
The earliest version of the show was first broadcast in the U.S. from 1956 to 1959; initially on ABC, and then later on NBC. The original show was created, hosted, and produced by comedian and presenter Jan Murray. Two contestants played a quiz in which the challenger picked one of five categories. These were shown on a large anchor from which Murray would quiz the contestants. Each contestant was asked five questions from the chosen category for $10 apiece on the daytime edition, or $50 apiece on the prime-time editions. The player who won the most money went on the treasure hunt, with both contestants advancing if tied.

In the treasure hunt, the champion picked one of 30 treasure chests. Each of these was filled with a series of prize packages or a large cash prize. The ABC prime time version offered $25,000 as its top prize. On the NBC daytime edition, the grand prize started at $1,000 and went up by $100 every time it was not won. On its prime-time counterpart, the jackpot started at $10,000 and increased by $1,000 a week until won. There were also some joke prizes, such as a head of cabbage or a pound of onions. Before Murray would open the chest, the contestant would pick an envelope from a wheel-shaped board containing sealed cash amounts from $100 up. They were then given the choice of either taking the money or the contents of the treasure chest. Regardless of the outcome, the contestant returned to play another game.

At the end of the show, Murray would select someone from the audience to draw a postcard from a home viewer that had a number from 1 to 30 written on it. If the cash jackpot was in the chest marked with the same number, the home viewer won the jackpot. If not, the viewer was given a consolation prize. Also, the person who picked the postcard received a prize. Instead of looking in the treasure chest the viewer selected, Murray would open a safe, protected by a security guard, containing a folded piece of paper with the pre-selected number of the chest that actually held the cash prize.

The set of the 1950s version of Treasure Hunt had a pirate-influenced motif with treasure chests. When the contestant picked a chest in the bonus round, the "Pirate Girl" (Marian Stafford), who acted as Murray's assistant, would put the box on a movable table that resembled a pirate ship.

On the occasions when Murray was unavailable, other comedians would fill-in as emcee, including Buddy Hackett.

== 1970s version (The New Treasure Hunt) ==
The New Treasure Hunt was a reboot of the 1950s TV series. It involved women competing to find a grand prize of $25,000, hidden in one of 30 "surprise packages." Unlike the original version, the show did not use a question-and-answer trivia round, with contestants relying entirely on luck. The pirate theme was also abandoned, with brightly decorated cardboard gift boxes taking the place of the treasure chests.

Before each game began, the production staff distributed small gift boxes to 10 female members of the studio audience. Three of these boxes contained cards numbered 1 to 3, while the others were empty. When instructed to open the boxes, the women who found the cards would come to the stage and each choose one of three jack-in-the-boxes. The contestant whose jack-in-the-box had a pop-up surprise, such as flowers or a doll, earned the right to go on the treasure hunt; the other two received consolation prizes.

After being shown two or three of the prizes hidden among the 30 packages, the contestant was asked to select one of the boxes, which was brought down to the table by a model assistant. Host Geoff Edwards would open an envelope attached to the box and reveal a card with a dollar amount (ranging from $200 to $2,000 originally; later in the run, from $500 up to $2,500). He then handed that money to the contestant, visibly counting out each bill into her hand, and gave her the choice of keeping it or taking the contents of the box.

Prizes were kept behind curtains on opposite ends of the stage, similar to the style of Let's Make a Deal or The Price Is Right. Aside from the $25,000 grand prize, valuable items at stake in any particular game could include vacations, automobiles (sometimes expensive luxury models or sports cars), jewelry, furniture, appliances, and cash awards of several thousand dollars. However, some boxes held booby prizes, referred to as "klunks" (a word coined by Geoff Edwards, similar in meaning to the "zonks" on Let's Make a Deal or "chascos" on Trato Hecho), that had very little value. Every valuable prize was worth more than the cash amount attached to its box.

Upon making her decision, the contestant was not immediately shown what she had won, as the premise of this program was to display and exploit the female contestants' emotional reactions. Edwards would instead engage the contestant in a comedic sketch, involving props taken from the box and frequently onstage personnel in various costumes and roles, to intentionally mislead her to what she had finally won, prolonging the tension and the feeling of suspense. Very often, a contestant would be shown a klunk as a lead-in to a different item, which could be another klunk or a valuable prize. However, the box containing the $25,000 prize never had a sketch or prop associated with it; after building up suspense, Edwards would simply pull out the check. At the end of the presentation, Edwards would turn the now-empty box toward the camera to show there was nothing else hidden inside.

Two games were played during each show, each game involving a different half of the studio audience. If a contestant found the $25,000 grand prize during the first game, another was hidden for the second one. At the end of each episode, if the grand prize had not been found in the second game, Edwards ritually asked security guard Emile Autuori if he had indeed hidden the $25,000 check. Autuori would reply in the affirmative, give Edwards a card with the location of the check, and open that box so he could show it to the audience.

=== Production ===
Producer Chuck Barris purchased the U.S. Treasure Hunt format in the 1970s and revived the game in weekly syndication in 1973. Geoff Edwards hosted The New Treasure Hunt with Johnny Jacobs as the announcer. Jan Murray received a "created by" credit during the show's closing credits.

The opening theme, closing theme, and klunk music cues were composed by Chuck Barris himself. Though Barris was an accomplished songwriter, the melodic closing theme of the 1970s Treasure Hunt, also occasionally used as a winners' cue, is in fact an instrumental version of the theme from the 1969 film True Grit, composed by Elmer Bernstein. Some of Barris's music from other game shows he produced, such as The Newlywed Game and the unsold pilot for Cop-Out!, was also featured on the program.

Producers devised a different sketch for every box in each episode. Shortly before each taping, Autuori (under the supervision of a standards and practices representative) would randomly draw a number between 1 and 30, secretly replacing the contents of the designated box with the grand prize check. In order to prevent the contestant from learning about the sketch associated with her chosen box, cue cards were not used on the set during the prize presentation. After a box was chosen, taping would be paused so that Edwards could be briefed on the premise of the prize package reveal. Edwards had experience as an actor in addition to his radio work and game show hosting, and the producers encouraged him to build the tension as he saw fit, even to unbearable levels. The only time no sketch took place was when the contestant won the grand prize. The common method of the reveal would entail Edwards suggesting to the contestant that she should have kept the money in the envelope, before revealing that she had, in fact, won the grand prize. Hysterics occurred following the revealing of the check: shrill sirens went off; confetti and balloons dropped from the ceiling; and, on a few occasions, the contestant was swarmed onstage by Barris staff members and humorously given roses.

=== Reception ===
This version of the show was nominated for an Emmy Award in 1974 for Outstanding Achievement in Costume Design, losing to The Autobiography of Miss Jane Pittman.

== 1980s version (Treasure Hunt) ==
Treasure Hunt returned to television in 1981 as a daily series. Geoff Edwards hosted again, with Jan Speck as the prize model and assistant. Johnny Jacobs returned to announce, but due to what would prove to be a terminal illness he left the show and Tony McClay replaced him. Emile Autuori returned in his role as the security agent responsible for placing the grand prize check in one of the boxes.

Again, two games were played per show, one with each half of the audience. In this version, the female members of the studio audience were given balloons, which were popped on Edwards's cue. The woman whose balloon had a card with a star came down to the stage to challenge the previous game's champion (in the first episode, two balloons had stars). There were now only two jack-in-the-boxes, with the challenger receiving the choice between them. As in the 1970s version, the contestant who had the pop-up surprise in her jack-in-the-box advanced to the treasure hunt.

The contestant selected from 66 surprise packages on stage, and again was given the opportunity to sell the box to Edwards for between $500 and $1,000. The grand prize was a progressive jackpot starting at $20,000 and increasing by $1,000 for each day it went unclaimed, to a maximum of $50,000. After being won on the fourth episode, it was held at a fixed $20,000 for a period before the progressive jackpot was reinstated. If the jackpot was won in the first game of an episode, it was reset to $20,000 for the second game.

The prizes in this version were of lesser value than the 1970s series, but the champion from any treasure hunt always returned to face a new challenger in the next one and thus had a chance to increase her winnings. Automobiles were scaled back to economy models (specifically the Chevrolet Chevette); there were also no longer checks worth less than the grand prize.

The show featured a new closing theme by Milton DeLugg and reused some of the music cues from the earlier version. The opening sequence from The New Treasure Hunt was retained, with alterations to reflect the number of boxes in play and the day's grand prize.

== Controversy ==
An incident regarding The New Treasure Hunt concerned a contestant, Vera Augenbach, on a September 1974 episode (episode 36), who fainted on stage upon being told that she had won a 1937 Rolls-Royce Phantom III convertible. This incident was replayed on 60 Minutes as part of an exposé on the series; producer Chuck Barris expressed pride in the incident, given the show's premise.

In addition to playing on the presumed emotionalism of female contestants, the decision of Barris to allow only women in the game was reportedly a safety precaution – he was concerned that a male contestant might become angered by the show's antics (presumably including being led by a sketch, which typically ran for around five minutes or so, into a klunk) and physically attack Edwards or other staffers. However, in an interview on Blog Talk Radio, Edwards said men would most likely not show as much enthusiasm as the women, even if they won the grand prize.

During the 1970s run, Barris told Edwards during the fourth season (1976–1977) that he wanted to make The New Treasure Hunt even more sadistic for the upcoming fifth season (1977–1978) – an example being that the contestant would be shown a very expensive car (such as a Rolls-Royce, Ferrari, or Mercedes-Benz) but, after the excitement subsided, learn that the prize was only a small part of the vehicle (such as the rear-view mirror). Edwards refused and was initially fired, but Barris quickly went back on that decision and Edwards did not miss any episodes. Instead, Edwards left on his own after the season ended and Barris, unwilling to replace him, cancelled the series shortly afterward.

== Attempted reboots ==
=== Columbia TriStar Television/Quincy Jones-David Salzman Entertainment ===
In May 1997, it was announced that a pilot for the show (taped in 1996) was produced by Columbia TriStar Television after acquiring the rights to the Barris library in the early 90s in order to pair up with a revival of Name That Tune produced by Quincy Jones-David Salzman Entertainment (also producing the TH remake at the time) after their normal producing partner Warner Bros. passed on the NTT remake. According to other news groups at the time either Chuck Woolery or Pat Finn would've become the host. However, both shows never got off the ground.

=== The Gurin Company ===
In October 2012, The Gurin Company bought the license of the show from Barris. The company wanted to produce an updated version in which three couples compete against each other as they select treasure chests, all of which have surprises in them. The team with the most prizes would move on to a quest for $1 million. Gurin was partnered with veteran game show host Wink Martindale, with Mark Maxwell-Smith and John Ricci Jr. as producers. It was shipped to both the U.S. and international broadcasters as he pitched the show along with a possible reboot of Truth or Consequences.

=== Electus/Barracuda Television Productions ===
In September 2015, Electus, along with the conjunction of Barracuda Television Productions, acquired the rights to the show where the basic premise remains the same: a single contestant selects 1 of 30 treasure chests and wins what is inside, with comedic distractions to heighten the tension at each decision point. This was to be produced by Barry Poznick, along with veteran game show host Wink Martindale and John Ricci Jr.

== See also ==
- Deal or No Deal – Game show similar in concept to Chuck Barris's Treasure Hunt.
- Let's Make a Deal – Another game show similar in concept.
