= Caribbean Moonlight =

Studio album by Les Baxter
- Released: 1956
- Genre: Easy listening, exotica
- Label: Capitol T 733

Les Baxter chronology
| Les Baxter's La Femme (1956) | Caribbean Moonlight (1956) | Skins! Bongo Party with Les Baxter (1957) |

Caribbean Moonlight is an album by Les Baxter. It was released in 1956 on Capitol Records. In January 1957, it reached the No. 5 spot on Billboard magazine's "Pop Instrumentals" chart.

AllMusic later gave the album a rating of four stars. Reviewer Jason Akeny wrote that "its melodies move with the hypnotic beauty and sway of moonbeams flickering across the water's surface, while its supple, exotic rhythms conjure a nearly mystical paradise of palm trees, sandy beaches, and cool breezes."

== Track listing ==
Side 1

1. "Taboo" (Marguerita Lecana, Al Stillman)
2. "Deep Night" (Charlie Henderson, Rudy Vallee)
3. "The Breeze and I" (Ernesto Lecuana, Al Stillman)
4. "Nightingale" (Xavier Cugat, George Rosner)
5. "Temptation" (Nacio Herb Brown, Arthur Freed)
6. "Poinciana" (Nat Simon, Buddy Bernier, Manuel Lliso)

Side 2

1. "Ay, Ay, Ay" (Osmán Pérez Freire)
2. "Adios" (Enric Madriguera)
3. "Carnival" (Harry Warren, Bob Russell)
4. "Green Eyes" (Nilo Menéndez)
5. "Out of This World" (Harold Arlen, Johnny Mercer)
6. "Sway (Quien Sera)" (Pablo Beltrán Ruiz-Norman Gimbel)
