= Phil Campos =

- Born: June 8, 1934; New York
- Died: July 2, 1987 (aged 53) California
- Occupation: Singer
- Labels: Impact, Crown Records, Envoy
- Formerly of: Les Baxter's Balladeers; The Forum; Phil Campos & the Forum

Phil Campos was an American singer who recorded a couple of albums and singles during the 1960s. He was a member of folk groups, Les Baxter's Balladeers in the early 1960s and later the group leader of The Forum which had a hit in the late 1960s. He was also an actor who appeared in some well-known television shows.

== Career ==
In the early 1960s, Campos was a member of Les Baxter's Balladeers and was with the group when they recorded their 1961 self-titled album, released on the Reprise label.

His single "Street Fight" / "Rebel Rider" was released in 1960 on the Impact label. "Street Fight" would later appear on the Sin Alley! volume 4 various artists comp which was released on Sleaze Records.

While with Les Baxter's Balladeers Campos, with his baritone voice, attracted attention. The Reno Gazette-Journal noted his handling of "Sinner Man" and him singing the solo parts of "Asheville Junction".

By August 1963, Campos & Paul Hansen had recorded an album, which was released on the Crown label.

Reporting on the Hootenanny '63 event at Carnegie Hall, Billboard's Lee Zhito wrote in the September 7 issue of the magazine that Campos with his key sense humor and dramatic projection covering the song "Street Fight" and the effect it had on the audience was the most outstanding of the new face acts. In a review of the 1963 various artists album Hootenanny At The Troubadour, Campos who covered the song "Captain Kidd", was singled out by the Billboard reviewer as a real talent find. In 1964, Campos appeared in an episode of The Folk World of Jimmie Rodgers.

In 1966, Campos had formed the group, The Forum which was consisted of him and 2 females. The other 2 members were Rene Nole (whom he would later marry) and a teenage girl Riselle Bain. In 1967, the group had a hit with "The River Is Wide". They also released an album of the same name with half of the songs penned by Les Baxter. In December 1968 Campos was in Nevada, appearing at the Carson City Nugget, billed as Phil Campos & the Forum. After the group folded, Campos and his wife formed a duo. Around April 1969, Campos and the Forum were appearing at the Theatre Lounge of the Carson City Nugget every night except Sundays. Campos also had another role as the show's MC. His covering of songs such as "He's Got The Whole World In His Hands" and "Sailor Man, Where You Gonna Run To?" had a definite impact on the audience.

In September 1970, along with Rene Noel and the Four Tunes, Campos began a month long engagement at the Mint Hotel in Las Vegas.

== Acting and television ==
Ads an actor, Campos had a few roles in television shows such as Dragnet, Wagon Train and Badge 14.

== Death ==
Campos died in July 1987.

== Discography ==
Singles
Title	Release info	Year	Notes
"Street Fight" / "Rebel Rider"	Impact 2-IMX		

Albums
Title	Release info	Year	F	Notes
Famous Folk Songs	Crown Records CST 326			
Doesn't Anybody Know My Name?	Envoy VOY 9161	1966	LP	

Various artist compilation appearances
Title	Appears on	Release info	Year	F	Notes
"Captain Kid"	Various artists - Hootenanny At The Troubadour	Horizon Records WP-1616	1963	LP	
"Big Jack"	Various artists - The Big Hootenanny	Young World – SYH-1502; World Record Club – YH 1502	1965	LP	
"Street Fight"	Various artists - Sin Alley! Volume Four - Filthy, Sleazey 50s Trash!	Sleaze Records SL-5562	1988	LP	
"Rebel Rider"	Various artists - Bent, Batty And 'Bnoxious	Torture – OOO-NO!		LP	
