= Les Baxter's African Jazz =

Studio album by Les Baxter and His Orchestra
- Released: 1959
- Genre: Easy listening, exotica
- Length: 29:53
- Label: Capitol ST 1117
- Producer: Voyle Gilmore

Les Baxter and His Orchestra chronology
Love is a Fabulous Thing (1958)	Les Baxter's African Jazz (1959)	Les Baxter's Jungle Jazz (1959)

Les Baxter's African Jazz is an album by Les Baxter and His Orchestra. It was released in 1959 on Capitol Records The album consists of original music composed by Baxter. Upon its release, the album received a four-star rating from Billboard magazine. Billboard called it an "imaginative package" with "inventive treatments", excellent sound, and "lush, rich approaches."

== Track listing ==
Side 1

1. "Congo Train"
2. "Elephant Trail"
3. "Banana Boy"
4. "Safari"
5. "Mombasa After Midnight"
6. "Rain"

Side 2

1. "Lost City"
2. "Walkin' Watusi"
3. "Ostrich Hunt"
4. "Cairo Bazaar"
5. "Jungalero"
6. "Balinese Bongos"
