= 'Round the World with Les Baxter =

Studio album by Les Baxter, His Orchestra and Chorus
- Released: 1957
- Genre: Easy listening
- Label: Capitol T 780

Les Baxter, His Orchestra and Chorus chronology
Skins! Bongo Party with Les Baxter (1957)	'Round the World with Les Baxter (1957)	Midnight on the Cliffs (1957)

'Round the World with Les Baxter is an album by Les Baxter, His Orchestra and Chorus. It was released in 1957 on Capitol Records. The album was recorded on August 8, 1956.

Upon its release, Billboard gave the album a score of 79 out of 100 and described it as consisting of "glittering performances" with "lush arrangements".

AllMusic later gave the album a rating of three-and-a-half stars. Reviewer Jason Ankeny wrote that Baxter proved "his unparalleled skill for translating the sounds and textures of foreign lands into sublimely melodic travelogues that capture settings based far more in fantasy than reality. . . . each arrangement perfectly captures the cinematic precision of Baxter's artistry . . ."

== Track listing ==
Side 1

1. "(What Happens In) Buenos Aires"
2. "Melodia Loca (The Chilean Crazy Song)"
3. "The Poor People of Paris"
4. "Japanese Parasols"
5. "The Clown on the Eiffel Tower"
6. "Auf Wiederseh'n, Sweetheart"

Side 2

1. "Venezuela"
2. "Purple Islands"
3. "Padam, Padam"
4. "Normandy"
5. "Monika"
6. "Romantic Rio"
