= The Passions (album) =

Studio album by Les Baxter featuring Bas Sheva
- Released: 1954
- Genre: Easy listening, exotica
- Label: Capitol

Les Baxter chronology
Thinking of You (1954)	The Passions (1954)	Arthur Murray Favorites: Modern Waltzes (1955)

The Passions is an album by Les Baxter featuring vocals by Bas Sheva. It was released in 1954 on the Capitol label (catalog nos. LAL-486). From February through December 1954, it was included in Billboard's chart of the top five Best Selling Specialized High-Fidelity Albums.

== Track listing ==
Side 1

1. "Despair"
2. "Ecstasy"
3. "Hate"

Side 2

1. "Lust"
2. "Terror"
3. "Jealousy"
4. "Joy"
