= Jose Gonzalez Gonzalez =

Mexican American actor (1922–2000)

- Publicity Photo of Jose Gonzales Gonzales
- Born: December 7, 1922; Aguilares, Texas
- Died: December 15, 2000 (aged 78); Marina Del Rey Hospital; Los Angeles, California, U.S.
- Occupation: Character actor
- Years active: 1954–1991
- Spouse: Ventura Gonzalez-Gonzalez

Jose Gonzalez Gonzalez (December 7, 1922 – December 15, 2000) was a Mexican-American character actor and the brother of actor Pedro Gonzalez Gonzalez.

== Life and career ==
Born Jose Gonzalez Gonzalez in Aguilares, Texas to a Mexican American father and a Mexican born mother with identical surnames, Gonzalez Gonzalez grew up in a talent-filled home. Jose began in show business as part of his family's act called "Las Perlitas" that toured southwest Texas. He made his television debut in 1954 as Jose Gonzales de la Vega on two episodes of The Cisco Kid. In 1962 He played Joze on the S2E28 in the 'Innocents Abroad' episode of My Three Sons He had a prolific career in both television and motion pictures concluding with his final performance as Mariachi in The Naked Gun 2½: The Smell of Fear (1991).

Jose toured the US as both a singer and comedian his own stage shows, where he appeared at state fairs and conventions such as the Los Angeles County Fair, the Monterey County Fair, The Napa County Fair, and the Sacramento State Fair, as well as Cinco de Mayo celebrations in various locations.

== Personal life ==
After suffering for many years with myeloblastic anemia, he died as a result of a brain hemorrhage brought on by the disease. Jose was survived by his wife of 55 years, Ventura; three daughters Rosalinda, Armandina, Miroslava; seven grandchildren: Jose Nicholas, Joseph Nicholas, Terry Tigner, Tessie Tigner, Miguel Reyes II, Christina Galvan, Armandina Galvan, and one great-grandchild Miguel Reyes III. He was 78 at the time of his death, which occurred on December 15, 2000.

== Partial filmography ==
- Strange Lady in Town (1955) - Jose (uncredited)
- Hell's Island (1955) - Cock Fight Man (uncredited)
- The Fighting Chance (1955) - Jockey (uncredited)
- Terror at Midnight (1956) - Delivery Man (uncredited)
- Wetbacks (1956) - Wetback
- The Three Outlaws (1956) - El Raton
- Cha-Cha-Cha Boom! (1956) - Pedro Fernandez
- Kronos (1957) - Manuel Ramirez
- Panama Sal (1957) - Peon
- Showdown at Boot Hill (1958) - Mexican Man with Donkey (uncredited)
- The Hangman (1959) - Pedro Alonso
- Sex Kittens Go to College (1960) - Mexican (uncredited)
- Mermaids of Tiburon (1962) - Pepe Gallardo
- For Love or Money (1963) - Jose
- From Nashville with Music (1969) - Himself
- Moonfire (1970) - Jesus
- Herbie Goes Bananas (1980) - Garage Owner
- The Naked Gun 2½: The Smell of Fear (1991) - Mariachi (final film role)
