= Mermaids of Tiburon =

1962 film

- Theatrical release poster
- Directed by: John Lamb
- Written by: John Lamb
- Starring: George Rowe; Diane Webber; Gaby Martone; Timothy Carey
- Cinematography: John Lamb
- Edited by: Bert Honey
- Music by: Richard LaSalle
- Distributed by: Filmgroup
- Release date: 1962
- Running time: 76 minutes
- Country: United States
- Language: English

Mermaids of Tiburon (in a modified version also known as Aqua Sex) is a 1962 film about a diver looking for buried treasure who comes across mermaids.

== Plot ==
Dr. Samuel Jamison, a marine biologist at Marineland of the Pacific, is approached by a man named Ernst Steinhauer, who presents him with a rare, unusually large "flame pearl" which he found in the coastal waters of Tiburón, and asks Jamison to confirm whether there are more. After considering the offer, Jamison travels to meet Steinhauer for the planned expedition, but finds him missing. After reporting Steinhauer's disappearance, Jamison decides to hire a charter boat and conduct the expedition by himself, unaware that an unscrupulous individual named Milo Sangster has also learned of the treasure and, after having murdered Steinhauer, is planning to go after it to line his own pockets. After noting Jamison's presence, Sangster tails him with the aid of his unsuspecting skipper, Pepe Gallardo, dumping Steinhauer's body overboard on the way.

Arriving at Tiburón, Jamison begins to investigate the island's environs and its fauna, and unexpectedly encounters a group of mermaids residing in the coastal waters. His interest piqued, Jamison dives in to take a closer look, but finds himself taunted by the mermaids and their pet killer shark. After showing them that he means no harm, one of the mermaids leads him to an underwater grotto, their hideout, which is filled with numerous giant clams, the source of Steinhauer's pearl.

Before long, Sangster arrives at Tiburón, and disregarding Pepe's protests, begins to throw lit dynamite sticks into the water in order to take Jamison out. While Jamison, stunned by the blasts, barely makes it to the surface, Sangster and Pepe submerge and find evidence of the pearl clams' existence. After recovering, Jamison boards Sangster's trawler and finds evidence of his murder of Steinhauer, but is surprised by Sangster and Pepe's return. Sangster clubs Jamison down and prepares to shoot him; when Pepe attempts to prevent this, Sangster throws him overboard, where Pepe is devoured by the shark. Jamison comes to and fights Sangster, who lights a magnesium flare to ward him off. During their struggle, the flare is dropped near Sangster's onboard cache of dynamite, igniting it and destroying the trawler. Jamison is taken to safety by the mermaids, while Sangster escapes in the trawler's lifeboat.

Still intent on harvesting the pearls, Sangster invades the grotto and also encounters the mermaids. After he shoots one of them with his speargun, the mermaids lure him into a narrow underwater fissure. As he chases after them, Sangster's oxygen supply runs out, and stuck inside the fissure, he is left trapped mere inches from the water's surface and drowns. Jamison makes it to safety with the mermaids' help, who thereupon vanish. His world view enlightened by this strange encounter, Jamison departs as the mermaids watch, promising himself to return one day.

== Cast ==
- George Robotham (credited as George Rowe) as Dr. Samuel Jamison
- Diane Webber as Mermaid Queen
- Gaby Martone as Lead Mermaid
- Timothy Carey as Milo Sangster
- Jose Gonzales-Gonzales as Pepe Gallardo
- John Mylong as Ernst Steinhauer
- Gil Barreto (credited as Gil Baretto) as Senor Baquero

== Production ==
The film incorporates some archival footage from Marineland.

When the film's first screening failed to garner attention at the box office, Lamb decided to shoot and add retroactively produced footage, which show the mermaid actresses partially nude and with flippers on their feet instead of full mermaid tails, which creates notable continuity differences in the movie.

== Release ==
The movie was acquired by Filmgroup Productions, who released it in 1962, mostly to some U.S. military bases.
