= The Hangman (1959 film) =

1959 film

- Film poster
- Directed by: Michael Curtiz
- Written by: Dudley Nichols
- Based on: The Hangman by Luke Short
- Produced by: Frank Freeman Jr.
- Starring: Robert Taylor; Tina Louise; Fess Parker; Jack Lord; Gene Evans; Mickey Shaughnessy
- Cinematography: Loyal Griggs
- Edited by: Terry O. Morse
- Music by: Harry Sukman
- Distributed by: Paramount Pictures
- Release date: June 17, 1959 (U.S.)
- Running time: 87 minutes
- Country: United States
- Language: English
- Box office: $1 million (est. US/ Canada rentals)

The Hangman is a 1959 American western film directed by Michael Curtiz and starring Robert Taylor, Tina Louise and Fess Parker. It was distributed by Paramount Pictures. The film is based on the short story of the same name by Luke Short.

== Plot ==
Deputy U.S. Marshal Mac Bovard, known as the Hangman for his success at seeing guilty men die for their crimes, rounds up three of four outlaws suspected in a robbery that resulted in murder. Two are hanged. The third is needed to identify John Butterfield, whose face Bovard has never seen. Due to be hanged soon, the third outlaw refuses to cooperate. Knowing that Butterfield had been a U.S. Army cavalry trooper, Bovard goes to Butterfield's former post, Fort Kenton, to get assistance from the Army in identifying Butterfield.

Butterfield's former girlfriend, Selah Jennison, works at Fort Kenton doing laundry. She refuses to help Bovard, even when he offers a $500 reward. Butterfield had been there for her after the death of her husband, so she remains loyal to him.

A freight driver, Johnny Bishop, could be the man Bovard is seeking, but kindly sheriff Buck Weston warns him that Bishop is one of the most well-liked men in town. Selah comes to warn the married and respectable Bishop, who is Butterfield. He swears to her that he merely watched the outlaws' horses, not knowing they were pulling a holdup.

After Bovard persuades Bishop to surrender, Selah mocks the marshal, calling him "hangman" and claiming he is not interested in the truth. Bovard reveals to her that 20 years earlier he had been on the way to California to be a lawyer, accompanied by his brother. Their stagecoach was robbed by outlaws, who killed Bovard's brother. Bovard became a lawman and apprehended all of the murderers of his brother. They were subsequently hanged.

Bishop is broken out of jail, but Bovard allows him to escape by shooting at and deliberately missing Bishop as he rides away. Selah realizes what he has done. Bovard then tells Selah and Buck that he is quitting his job as a Deputy Marshal in order to take the stagecoach to California and become a lawyer as he had intended so many years earlier. Buck wants to marry Selah, but she realizes she loves Bovard, and boards the stage to go to California with him.

== Cast ==
- Robert Taylor as Mac Bovard
- Tina Louise as Selah Jennison
- Fess Parker as Buck Weston
- Jack Lord as Butterfield / Bishop
- Gene Evans as Big Murph Murphy
- Mickey Shaughnessy as Al Cruse
- Betty Lynn as Molly
- James Westerfield as Herb Loftus
- Jose Gonzales-Gonzales as Pedro Alonso
- Lorne Greene as Marshal Clum Cummings
- Richard Collier as Hotel Clerk
- Regis Toomey as Army Orderly (uncredited)

== See also ==
- List of American films of 1959
