= Harry Revel =

American composer (1905–1958)

- Born: Harry Glaser; 21 December 1905; London, England
- Died: 3 November 1958 (aged 52) New York City, U.S.
- Genres: Traditional pop, soundtracks, space age pop
- Occupation: Composer
- Years active: 1922–1950s

Harry Revel (né Glaser; 21 December 1905 – 3 November 1958) was a British-born American composer, mostly of musical theatre, working with various lyricists, notably Mack Gordon. He is also seen as a pioneer of "space age pop".

== Early life and career ==
Revel was born Harry Glaser in London, England. He was the son of Russian emigrants of Jewish heritage, Jacob Glaser and his wife, from Schrunden in Latvia, who had settled in England. Harry was the second born of four children. His older brother William Revel was a dancer, his younger sister Rene was a singer, and his youngest brother Sam was a concierge in London who later became a travel agent in the United States. They took the last name "Revel" to honor the French soldier of that name who helped them to flee Europe.

Harry Revel learned piano as a child, and studied at the Guildhall School of Music in London. He left around 1922 to go to Paris, where he joined a so-called Hawaiian Band, and toured Europe. He also had his first song, "Oriental Eyes", published in Italy. He then joined a dance band, the New York Jazz Band, and while touring with the group in Berlin was commissioned to write the music for an operetta, Was Frauen Traumen. Its success led to further commissions in Paris, Vienna and London.

== Musical theatre and films ==
After returning to England, he decided in 1928 to move to New York City and become a professional songwriter. There, he teamed up with lyricist Mack Gordon to work on Broadway, writing songs for Ziegfeld Follies of 1931, Fast and Furious, Everybody's Welcome and Smiling Faces. Among their songs was the popular "Underneath the Harlem Moon" (1932), which was recorded by several jazz performers.

He and Gordon moved to Hollywood in 1932 and signed as a team for Paramount Pictures. There, Revel wrote scores for the films Sitting Pretty, Broadway Through a Keyhole, We're Not Dressing, She Loves Me Not, Shoot the Works, College Rhythm, Love in Bloom, Paris in the Spring, Stolen Harmony, Two for Tonight, and Collegiate. In 1936, they moved to Twentieth Century Fox, and continued to have success with films including Stowaway, Poor Little Rich Girl, Ali Baba Goes to Town, Wake Up and Live, You Can't Have Everything, Head Over Heels, and Love Finds Andy Hardy. In 1934, he appeared in Hollywood Rhythm, a short film purporting to show the songwriting team of Gordon and Revel brainstorming the score for College Rhythm.

Revel's partnership with Mack Gordon ended in 1939. Revel remained a British citizen; on two occasions, he and his brother Billy Revel were found guilty of entering the United States with false passports, and were fined. During World War II, Revel organized variety shows for the USO, and continued to write music for films. He was nominated for an Academy Award in 1942 for "There's a Breeze on Lake Louise", from The Mayor of 44th Street, written with Mort Greene; and again for "Remember Me to Carolina", from Minstrel Man (1944), written with Paul Francis Webster. He also wrote the score for the 1945 Broadway musical Are You With It?, with lyrics by Arnold Horwitt.

== Space age pop ==
In the late 1940s, Revel became interested in using the theremin to create electronic mood music, which he termed "therapeutical music". He worked with arranger and conductor Les Baxter and theremin player Samuel Hoffman to create the 1947 album Music Out of the Moon, released by Capitol Records, and Perfume Set to Music on RCA Victor the following year. In 1950, he wrote the music for Music for Peace of Mind, again with Hoffman but this time with Billy May's orchestra; and in 1955 released Harry Revel's Music from Out of Space, with the Stuart Phillips orchestra and chorus, rather than theremin. Revel has subsequently been seen as a pioneer of "space age pop".

== Later activities and death ==
Revel set up his own publishing company, Realm Music Inc., in the 1950s, and continued to compose until his death.

He died from a cerebral hemorrhage in New York City in 1958, aged 52. He was posthumously inducted into the Songwriters Hall of Fame in 1970.

== Musical productions ==
- Blues in the Night [Musical, Revue] Featuring songs by Harry Revel 2 June 1982 – 18 July 1982
- Music Out of the Moon Themes by Harry Revel 1947
- Are You With It? [Musical] Music by Harry Revel 10 November 1945 – 29 June 1946
- Smiling Faces [Original, Musical, Comedy] Music by Harry Revel 30 August 1932 – 24 September 1932
- Marching By [Musical] Music by Harry Revel 3 March 1932 – [unknown]
- Fast and Furious [Musical, Revue] Music mostly by Harry Revel 15 September 1931 – [unknown]
- Ziegfeld Follies of 1931 [Musical, Revue] Music by Harry Revel 1 July 1931 – 21 November 1931
