= Ines Rau =

French transgender model (born 1990)

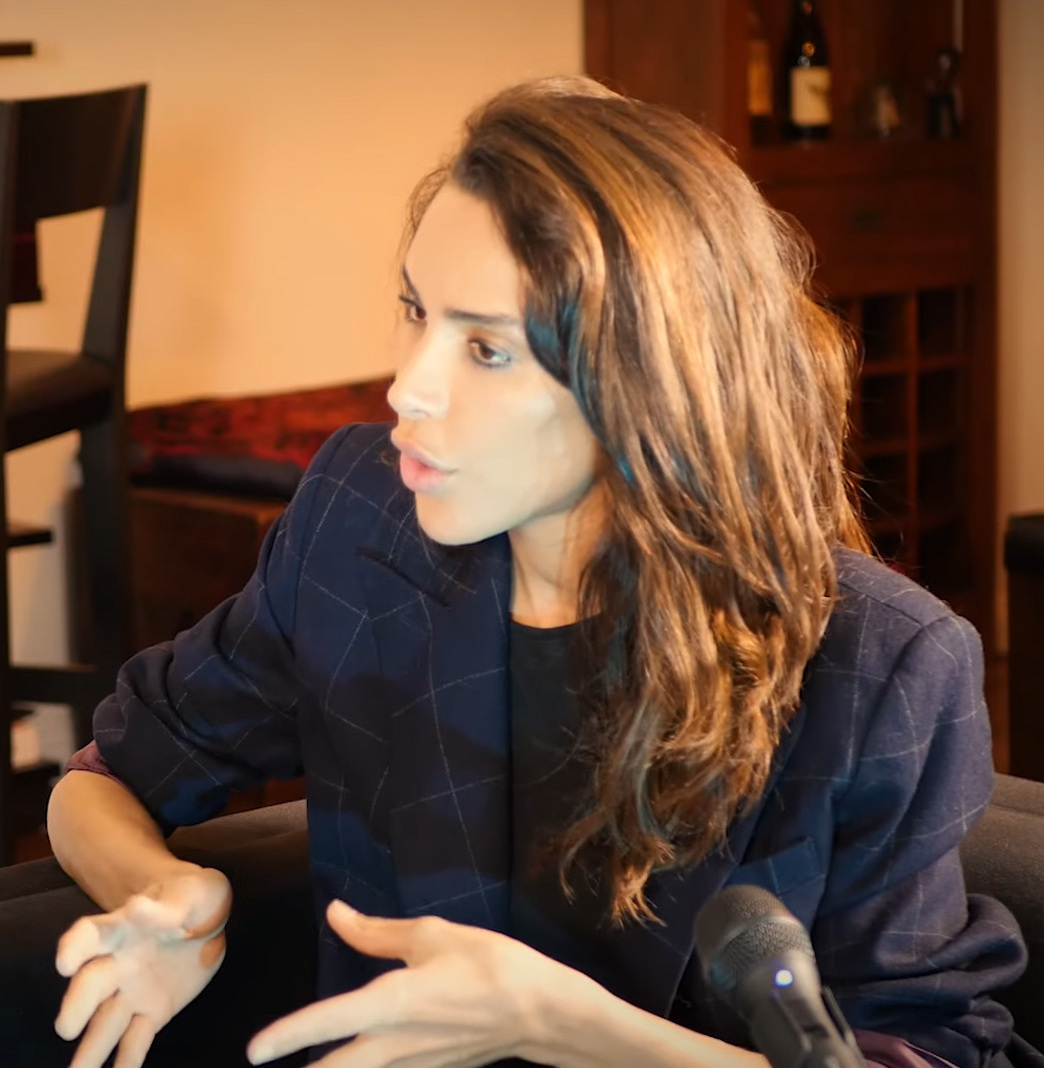
- Rau in 2019
- Born: Ines-Loan Rau; March 18, 1990 (age 36); Paris, France
- Occupation: Model
- Years active: 2013–present

Ines-Loan Rau (born March 18, 1990) is a French actress, model, and writer. She was Playboy magazine's Playmate of the Month for November 2017 and the first openly transgender Playmate. Ines-Loan Rau made history as the first transgender woman to become an ambassador for L'Oréal Paris and has held this role since 2020.

== Early life ==
Rau was born in Paris and is of French-North African descent. Rau transitioned and underwent gender-affirming surgery at the age of 16, after being inspired by the life story of English trans model Caroline "Tula" Cossey.

== Career ==
After turning 18, Rau started dancing for DJs in Ibiza, during which she became friends with David Guetta. In 2013, at age 23, she first posed nude with Tyson Beckford for a spread in OOB, a French luxury magazine, shortly after coming out as transgender. In May 2014, she first appeared in Playboy's "A-Z issue" in a spread titled "Evolution" that aimed to depict the growing acceptance of gender identities beyond the male-female binary. She became the second transgender woman to be featured in Playboy after Cossey in 1981 and the first who came out voluntarily (Cossey was outed against her will and reappeared in the magazine in 1991).

Following her magazine appearances, Rau worked as a model for Nicole Miller, Alexis Bittar and Barneys New York. She also appeared in Vogue Italia and in a campaign for Balmain.

In October 2017, Cooper Hefner, son of Playboy founder Hugh Hefner, announced that Rau would appear as "Playmate of the Month" in the magazine's November/December 2017 issue, making her the first openly transgender woman to be featured this way. Hefner likened the choice to feature Rau to his father's decision to feature Jennifer Jackson as the first African-American model to appear in Playboy as a Playmate in 1965.

== Activism ==
Following her coming-out, Rau became more active campaigning for transgender rights. In 2016, she appeared on the TF1 news format Sept à Huit on an episode focused on her life.
