= Ana Dias (photographer) =

Portuguese photographer (born 1984)

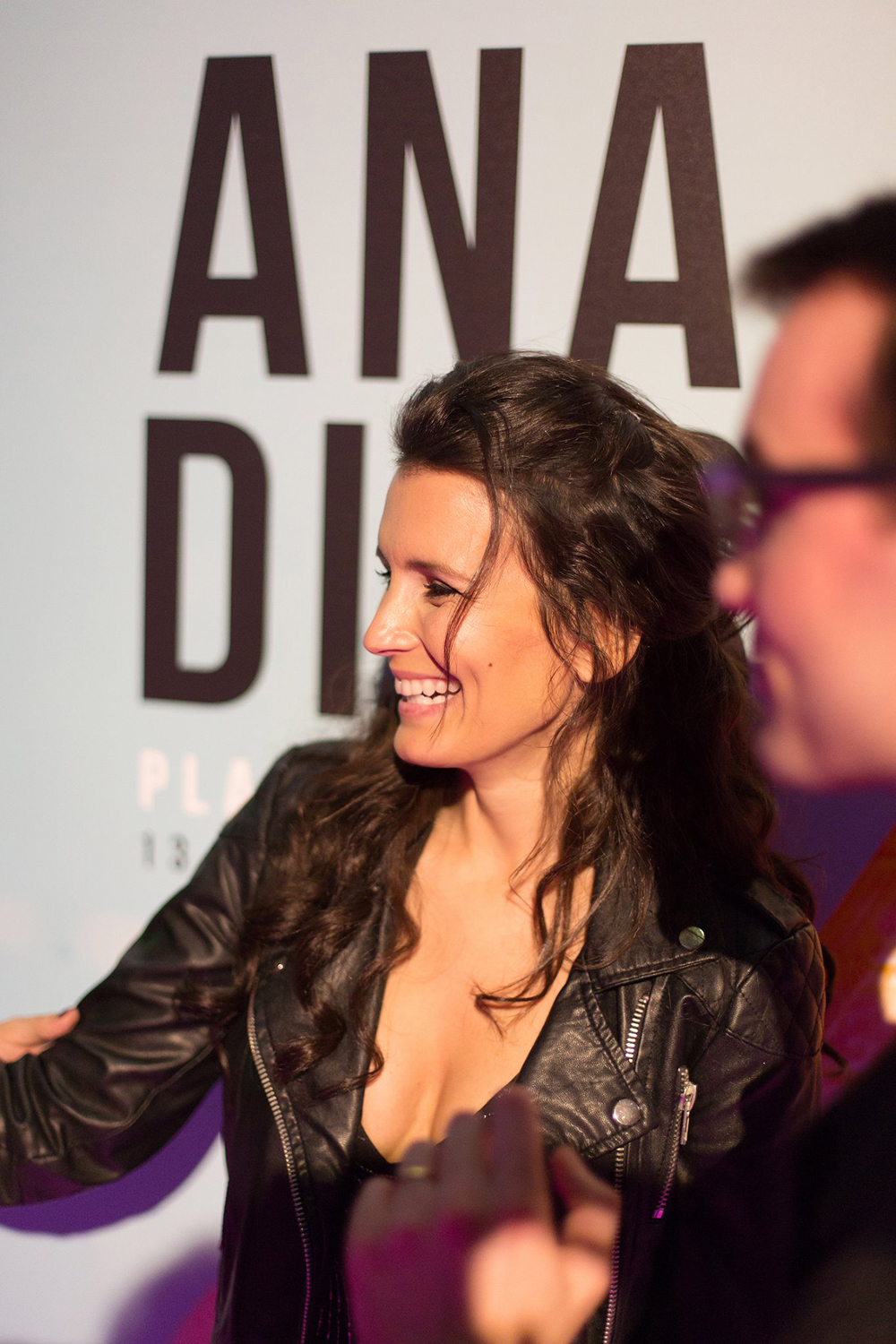
- Dias at the opening of her exhibition Playboy World in 2017
- Born: 1984 (age 41–42); Porto, Portugal
- Education: Porto Superior School of Art
- Occupation: Photographer
- Known for: Playboy magazine
- Website: anadiasphotography.com

Ana Dias (born 1984) is a Portuguese photographer, best known for her photography for Playboy magazine.

== Early life and education ==
Dias was born in Porto, Portugal, on 15 July 1984. She studied fine art at the Porto Superior School of Art, specializing in drawing, and graduated in 2007. Having finished her education, she started teaching serigraphy, lithography and engraving at the same school.

== Career ==
Her background in fine arts led her to photography. As a photographer, she works mainly with erotic femininity.

In 2012, she was a winner in the Fotoerotika Konkurs, organized by the Serbian edition of Playboy magazine, and her work was published in the magazine. In November 2012, she photographed the model Raquel Henriques for her first cover of the Portuguese edition of Playboy. Dias received Playboy invitations from South Africa, Germany, Netherlands, France, Russia, Brazil, Mexico, Thailand. She regularly collaborates with editions of the magazine in more than 20 countries. She has also photographed seven Playmates for the American edition of Playboy magazine: Valeria Lakhina (July 2018), Olga De Mar (October 2018), Miki Hamano (March 2019), Yoli Lara (June 2019), Teela LaRoux (July 2019), Marsha Elle (April 2020), and Priscilla Huggins (July 2020).

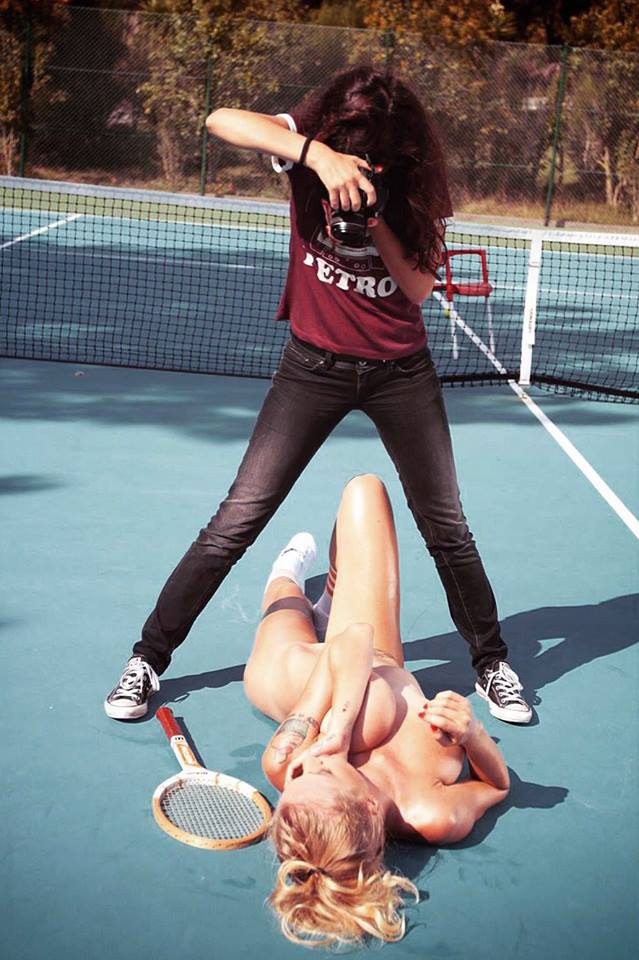
Dias photographing a female model, 2015

In June 2015, Dias starred in the web series Playboy Abroad: Adventures with Photographer Ana Dias. In each of the 24 episodes, she traveled to a different country to photograph a different model for a Playboy-style photo shoot. The web series included backstage at photo shoots, as well as the exploits of photographer, models and team.

On 4 August 2019, an image of Dias photographing a Playboy model appeared on the front page of The New York Times. In addition to Playboy, her work as a photographer has been published in men's magazines FHM, Maxim and Insomnia Magazine.

== Exhibitions ==
- Playboy World, Théâtre Mansart (France), September 2017; Casino Tróia (Portugal), August 2017; Casino Figueira (Portugal), June 2017; Casino Lisboa (Portugal), January 2017.
- Uma Viagem ao Mundo Playboy, Espaço Mude (Portugal), May 2017.
