= Catskill Honeymoon =

- Directed by: Josef Berne
- Written by: Joel Jacobson
- Produced by: Martin J. Cohen; Hymie Jacobson; Jack O. Lamont
- Cinematography: Charles Downs
- Edited by: Nathan Cy Braunstein; Jack Kemp
- Music by: Hymie Jacobson
- Production company: Martin Cohen Enterprises Inc.
- Distributed by: Martin Cohen Enterprises Inc.
- Release date: January 1950
- Running time: 96 minutes
- Country: United States
- Languages: English; Yiddish

Catskill Honeymoon is a 1950 American musical comedy film directed by Josef Berne. It features several prominent Jewish-American entertainers.

== Cast ==
- Michal Michalesko
- Jan Bart
- Bas Sheva
- Cookie Bowers
- Max Bozyk
- Reizl Bozyk
- The Feder Sisters
- Mike Hammer
- Henrietta Jacobson
- Julius Adler
- Mary LaRoche
- Abe Lax
- Al Murray
- David Page
- Dorothy Page
- Gita Stein
- Irving Grossman
- Dina Goldberg

== Release ==
The film premiered at the Plaza Theatre in Miami in January 1950. According to the National Film Preservation Foundation, the film's success "demonstrated that by 1950 the center of Jewish-American entertainment had moved from New York City to the Catskill resorts of upstate New York."

== Reception ==
Herb Rau of The Miami News wrote that the film is "loaded with entertainment", and praised both the music and the comedy. The New York Times wrote that the "people in the show are all full of spirit and their energy reaches out and stimulates the audience." Mildred Martin of The Philadelphia Inquirer wrote that the film is "slapped together in hit or miss fashion", and that it "strings its undistinguished material on the merest excuse for a plot.

Film critic J. Hoberman called the film "insipid" and wrote that it "dissolved Yiddish movies into canned vaudeville." Film historian Richard Koszarski wrote that "the shamelessly commercial montage that opens the film is probably the most interesting piece of work in it."
