= Bas Sheva =

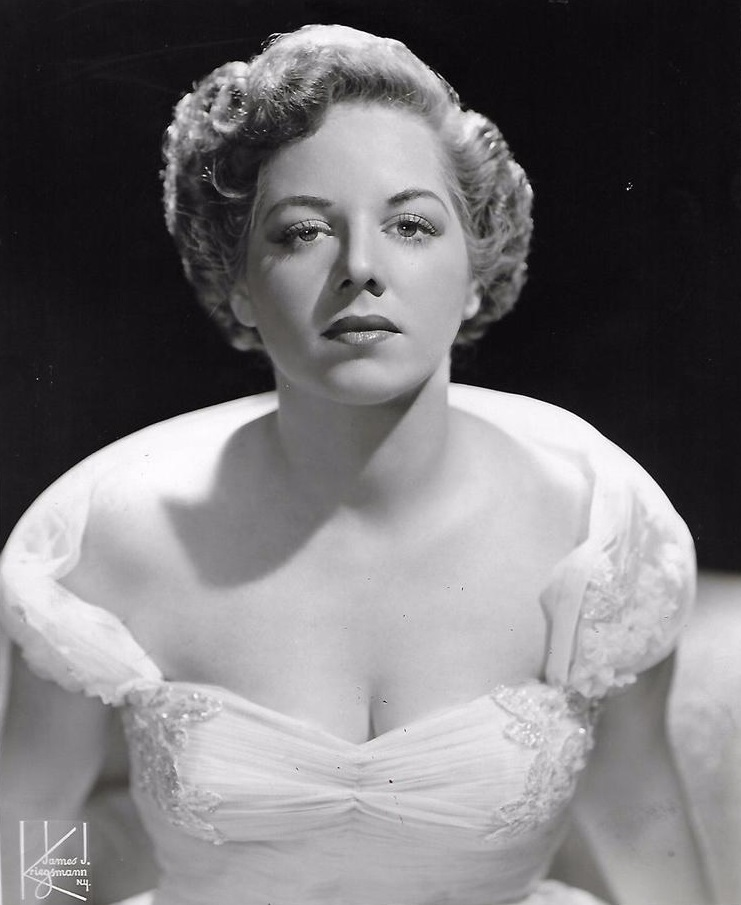
- Sheva in 1951

Background information
- Also known as: Bas Sheva
- Born: Bernice Kanefsky; July 25, 1925
- Origin: Philadelphia, United States
- Died: February 11, 1960 (aged 34) South Carolina, United States
- Genres: Easy listening, traditional Jewish music, jazz, space age pop, exotica, avant-garde music
- Occupation: Singer
- Instrument: Voice
- Years active: 1947–1960
- Formerly of: Les Baxter, Hal Mooney

Bas Sheva (July 25, 1925 – February 11, 1960), the stage name of Bernice Kanefsky, was an American singer, prominent in the 1950s. Although she began singing Jewish traditional and cantorial music, her career branched out into popular music.

== Early life ==
Bas Sheva was born Bernice Kanefsky, to the family of Cantor Joseph Kanefsky of the Crotona Park North section of the Bronx on July 25, 1925. She grew up in Philadelphia.

== Career ==
She studied voice with the intent of honoring her family's wishes that she become a cantor. Her voice was extremely powerful and had extraordinary dexterity. However, instead of cantorial music, she decided to move into popular music, adopting the stage name "Bas Sheva", the Ashkenazi pronunciation of the Biblical "Bathsheba". She began singing publicly in 1947. Her career began in the Borscht Belt of New York's Catskill Mountains, performing for audiences of Jewish vacationers. Her recording career began around 1950 with a small number of obscure singles of standard hits, none of which sparked much commercial interest.

She appeared in the 1950 Yiddish-American musical revue film Catskill Honeymoon.

In 1953 Bas Sheva was engaged by bandleader Hal Mooney as the principal singer for the album "Soul of a People", a collection of traditional Jewish songs issued by Capitol Records. This disk sold well in the Jewish market, and Bas Sheva's performances of this familiar material contributed much to its success.

In 1954, Les Baxter, a composer and producer at Capitol Records, offered her the role of star vocalist on his suite The Passions. In a review of the record, UP noted that "Bas Sheva's flexible voice adequately fills all the requirements called for in this ambitious project".

She appeared on The Ed Sullivan Show multiple times, earning her acclaim in Montreal. In 1957, she had plans for an "extended tour of England, France, South America, and Israel".

Bas Sheva died on February 11, 1960, at the age of 34, as a result of a diabetic reaction suffered while entertaining on board a cruise ship off the sea of South Carolina.

== Discography ==
- Soul of a People, Capitol L 8287
- The Passions (1954), Capitol
