= Les Baxter's Jungle Jazz =

Les Baxter's African Jazz

Studio album by Les Baxter and His Orchestra
- Released: 1959
- Genre: Easy listening, exotica
- Label: Capitol ST 1184
- Producer: Voyle Gilmore

Les Baxter and His Orchestra chronology
Les Baxter's African Jazz (1959)	Les Baxter's African Jazz (1959)	Les Baxter's Wild Guitars (1959)

Les Baxter's Jungle Jazz is an album by Les Baxter and His Orchestra. It was released in 1959 on the Capitol label (catalog no. T-1184). Plas Johnson is featured on tenor sax and alto flute. The music was composed by Baxter.

Upon its release designated it as "A Billboard Pick" and wrote: "This is a real swinger from start to finish. . . . The treatments are colorful, and the sound is excellent. . . . Buffs and bugs will take to this."

== Track listing ==
Side 1

1. "Brazilia"
2. "Rain Forest"
3. "Papagayo"
4. "Amazon Falls"
5. "Coco"
6. "Carnival Merengue"

Side 2

1. "Isle of Cuba"
2. "Blue Jungle"
3. "Voodoo Dreams"
4. "One Thousand Cockatoos"
5. "Go Chango"
6. "Jungle Brava"
