= Les Baxter's La Femme =

Studio album by Franck Pourcel And His French Strings
- Released: 1956
- Genre: Easy listening
- Label: Capitol T 10015

Les Baxter chronology
| Tamboo! (1956) | Les Baxter's La Femme (1956) | Caribbean Moonlight (1956) |

Les Baxter's La Femme is an album by French conductor Franck Pourcel and His French Strings. It was released in 1956 on the Capitol label (catalog no. T-10015). Upon its release, Billboard magazine gave the album a rating of 77 and wrote: "'La Femme' might be called a 'pop' symphony, in a dozen movements, dedicated to woman -- her eyes, lips, arms, hands, etc. The pieces are reflective of the mysteries of femininity, and the whole attractive opus is the work of Les Baxter."

== Track listing ==
Side 1

1. "Les Levres" ("The Lips")
2. "Les Bras" ("The Arms")
3. "Les Yeux" ("The Eyes")
4. "La Taille" ("The Waist")
5. "Les Doigts" ("The Fingers")
6. "Les Seins" ("The Breasts")

Side 2

1. "Les Hanches" ("The Hips")
2. "Le Lobe des Oreilles" ("The Earlobes")
3. "La Chevelure" ("The Hair")
4. "Le Mollet" ("The Calf")
5. "Les Cuisses" ("The Thighs")
6. "La Nuque" ("The Neck")
