= Tamboo! =

Studio album by Les Baxter, His Chorus and Orchestra
- Released: 1955
- Genre: Easy listening, exotica
- Label: Capitol

Les Baxter, His Chorus and Orchestra chronology
Kaleidoscope (1955)	Tamboo! (1955)	Les Baxter's La Femme (1956)

Tamboo! is an album by Les Baxter, His Chorus and Orchestra. It was released in 1955 on the Capitol label (catalog nos. T-655).

The album debuted on Billboard magazine's popular albums chart on January 28, 1956, peaked at No. 6, and remained on that chart for two weeks.

Ralph J. Gleason of the San Francisco Chronicle in 1955 described the album as "an odd LP", "really musically very dreary" but a "hi fi fan's dream" with its great recording and unusual sounds. He predicted "it could be a big hit as it is unlike anything else but, perhaps some of Baxter's own previous work."

Philip Hayward, in his 1999 book on exotica music, compared the album to the work of Maurice Ravel:

All of the tracks utilise the same limited set of musical devices techniques which closely resemble those used by Ravel. Especially conspicuous is Baxter's use of the textless choir -- what Mickey McGowan has dubbed "pseudo-head hunter oogum-boogum . . . Like the wordless choriuses in Daphnis et Chloé and Sirenes, Baxter's "native chanting" serves to position the exotic other in a mythic time and place."

AllMusic gave the album a rating of four-and-a-half stars. Reviewer Jo-Ann Greene wrote: "It's brilliantly done, and helped to broaden American minds and widen musical views."

== Track listing ==
Side 1

1. "Simba"
2. "Oasis of Dakhla"
3. "Maracaibo"
4. "Tehran"
5. "Pantan"
6. "Havana"

Side 2

1. "Mozambique"
2. "Wotuka"
3. "Cuchibamba"
4. "Batumba"
5. "Rio"
6. "Zambezi"

== Charts ==
Chart (1956)	Peak position
US Billboard's popular albums	6
