= Les Baxter's Balladeers =

Folk music group

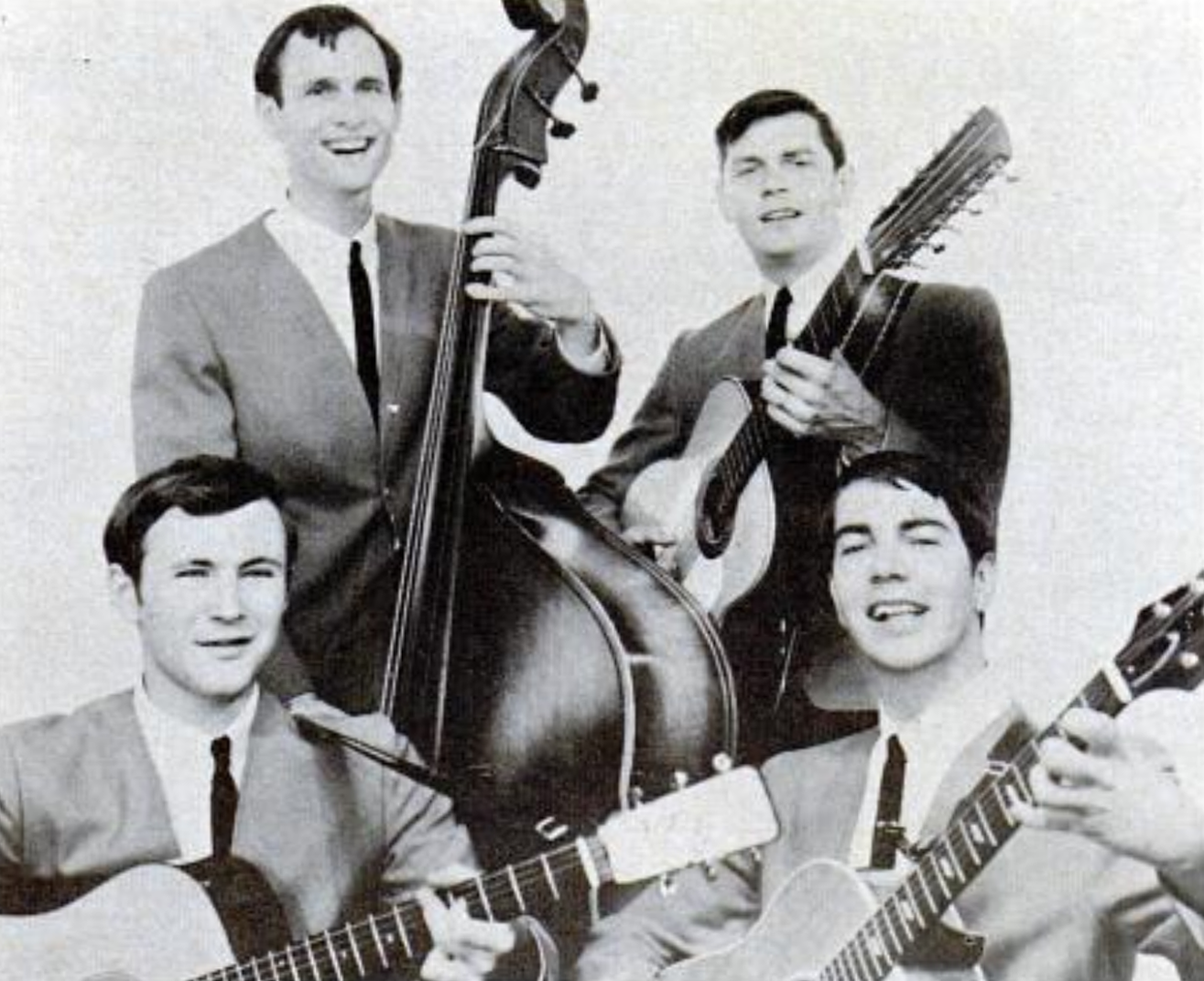

Background information
- Genres: Folk
- Years active: 1960s
- Label: Reprise
- Past members: Ted Botkin; Phil Campos; Mike Clough; David Crosby; Ethan Chip Crosby; Paul Hansen; Bob Ingram; Joyce James; Michael Kollander; Terrea Lea; Paul Potash; Ernie Sheldon; Peggy Taylor; Jerry Yester; Kenny Wertz

Les Baxter's Balladeers were a 1960s folk group formed by band leader Les Baxter. They released an album and a few singles during the early 1960s. Some of the musicians to pass through the group were David Crosby and his brother Ethan Chip Crosby, Bob Ingram and Phil Campos.

== Background ==
Les Baxter's Balladeers has the distinction of being the very first act to appear at The Golden Bear in Orange County, California. The group was made up of young folk singers. The role of the group was originally intended to make Baxter's act more "in the now". They would perform in the middle of Baxter's band's set.

In 1961, their self titled album Les Baxter's Balladeers was released on the Reprise label. The group at that time on the recording were Joyce James, Terrea Lea, Phil Campos, Ernie Sheldon, Paul Potash, Jerry Yester, Michael Kollander and Paul Hansen. The instrumentalists backing them were Allan Reuss on guitar, Mike Storm on 12-string guitar, Jerry Yester on banjo, Tony Reyes on bass and Chico Guerrero on drums.

Around 1962, Bobby Ingram and David Crosby joined the group. Crosby’s brother Ethan was also a member. They then did a national folk circuit tour. As of September 1963, the group consisted of Bob Ingram, David Crosby, Mike Clough and Ethan Chip Crosby. Later that month along with the Count Basie Sextet, Lisa Kirk, Allan Sherman and Vic Damone, they appeared on The Lively Ones, shown on NBC TV. After being in the group for a bit and feeling it was a bit too conservative for him, Crosby left and did the rounds on the LA folk circuit.

In April 1963, the lineup included Peggy Taylor, Phil Campos, Jerry Yester, Paul Hansen and Ted Botkin. They were appearing at venues like the Carson Nugget.

During their time they released an album and appeared on at least 3 singles.

== Discography ==
=== Singles ===
Singles
Act	Title	Release info	Year	Notes
Les Baxter's Balladeers	"Linin' Track" / "Baiion"	Link Records GNP 313	1963	
*Frank Sinatra, Les Baxter's Balladeers	*"Have Yourself A Merry Little Christmas" / "Go Tell It On The Mountains", "How Shall I Send Thee", "Carol Of The Bells", "Joy To The World"	Reprise R.20243	1963	
*Frank Sinatra, Les Baxter's Balladeers	*"Have Yourself A Merry Little Christmas" / "How Shall I Send Thee"	Reprise Records 0301	1964	
Les Baxter and his Orchestra Vocal Group: The Balladeers	"Michelle" / "Little Girl Lonely"	HBR HBR 456	1965	

Albums
Act	Title	Release info	Year	Notes
Les Baxter's Balladeers	Les Baxter's Balladeers	Reprise R9-6064	1961	
