= The Sacred Idol =

Studio album by Les Baxter and His Orchestra
- Released: 1960
- Genre: Easy listening, Exotica
- Label: Capitol ST 1293
- Producer: Voyle Gilmore

Les Baxter and His Orchestra chronology
Goliath and the Barbarians (film score) (1959)	The Sacred Idol (1960)	House of Usher (film score) (1960)

The Sacred Idol is an album by Les Baxter and His Orchestra. It was released in 1960 on Capitol Records. The music was composed by Baxter; it was originally intended to be the soundtrack for a film that was never released.

Upon its release, Billboard gave the album a rating of four stars and called it "exciting, exotic and colorful."

AllMusic also gave the album a rating of four stars. Reviewer Jason Ankeny called it "a journey to the center of the mind" and wrote that it conjured "a Latin American fantasia inspired by the legends of Aztec culture and spirituality".

== Track listing ==
Side 1

1. "Procession of the Princes"
2. "Feathered Serpent"
3. "Fruit of Dreams"
4. "Pool of Love"
5. "Aqueducts"
6. "The Games"

Side 2

1. "Conquistadores"
2. "Gardens of the Moon"
3. "Temple of Gold"
4. "Pyramid of the Sun"
5. "High Priest of the Aztecs"
6. "Acapulco"
