= Sony TC-50 =

1969 cassette recorder

The Sony TC-50 was a compact cassette recorder and portable audio player designed and marketed by Sony. It was conceived for the purpose of dictation but gained popularity with the general public after its use during the Apollo program lunar missions. It was released commercially in 1968.

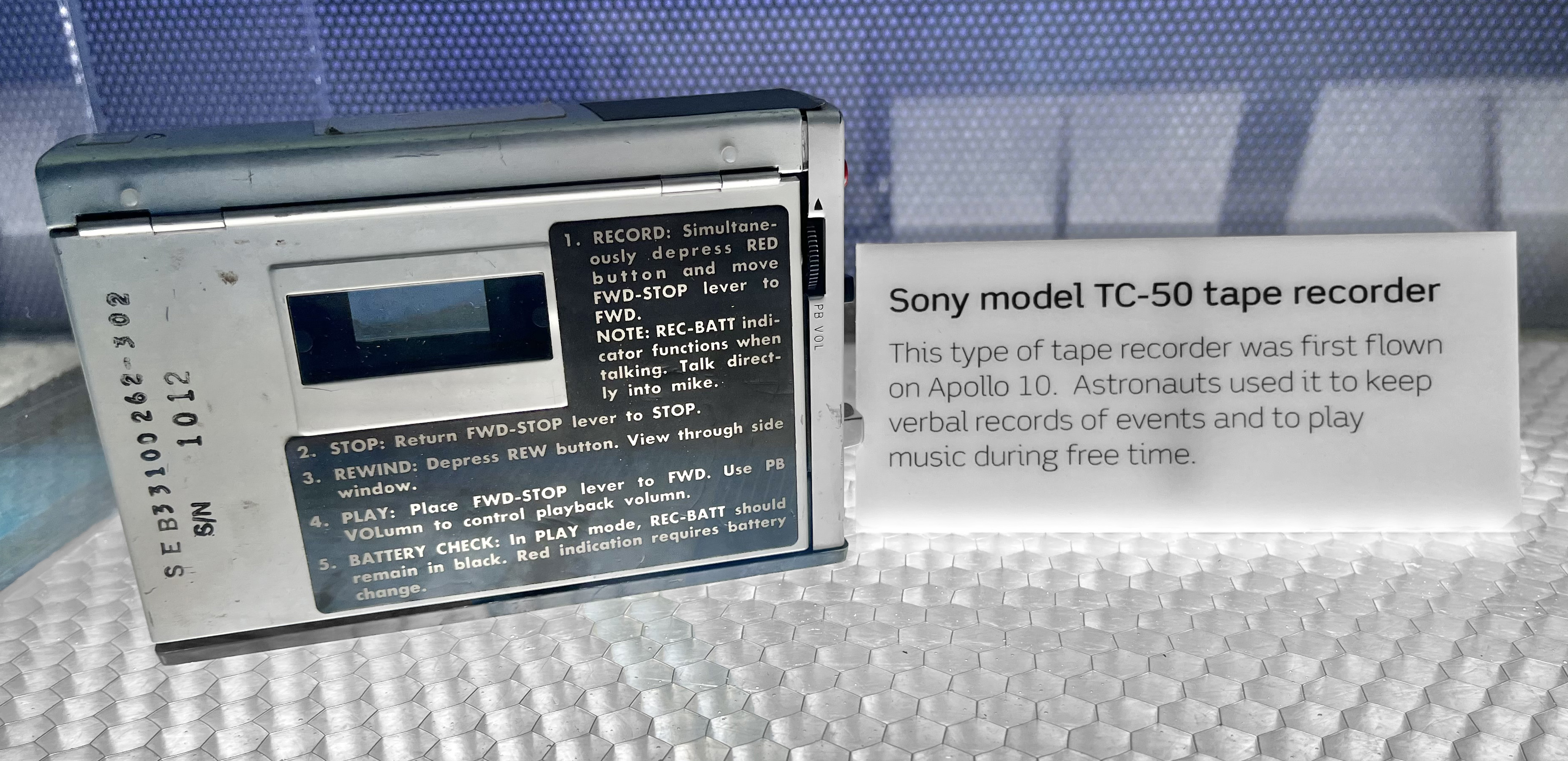
Sony TC-50 cassette tape recorder on display at the Houston Space Center

NASA furnished every astronaut with a Sony TC-50 from Apollo 7 in 1968 onward. Procured to facilitate the recording of personal mission logs, negating the need for additional paper work, the TC-50 was also used by astronauts to play their favorite mixtapes in the Apollo spacecraft. "Rather than blast off with only blank cassettes, the astronauts took tapes that had been pre-filled with music befitting their tastes" and recorded over them as the mission advanced forward. Neil Armstrong, Buzz Aldrin, and several other astronauts were provided with cassette recordings by Al Bishop and Hollywood producer Mickey Kapp.

The TC-50 has variously been described as a "predecessor" or "proto-Walkman" due to its compact design and similarity.
