= Les Baxter =

American composer and conductor (1922–1996)

Background information
- Born: Leslie Thompson Baxter; March 14, 1922; Mexia, Texas, U.S.
- Died: January 15, 1996 (aged 73) Newport Beach, California, U.S.
- Genres: Lounge music; exotica; swing; film score
- Occupations: Composer; conductor; singer; musician
- Instrument: Piano

Leslie Thompson Baxter (March 14, 1922 – January 15, 1996) was an American composer, conductor, and musician. After working as an arranger and composer for swing bands, he developed his own style of easy listening music, known as exotica, and scored over 250 radio, television and motion pictures numbers.

== Early life ==
Baxter studied piano at the Detroit Conservatory of Music before moving to Los Angeles for further studies at Pepperdine College. From 1943 on he played tenor and baritone saxophone for the Freddie Slack big band. Abandoning a concert career as a pianist, he turned to popular music as a singer. At the age of 23 he joined Mel Tormé's Mel-Tones, singing on Artie Shaw records such as "What Is This Thing Called Love?"

== Career ==
Baxter then turned to arranging and conducting for Capitol Records in 1950 and conducted the orchestra in two early Nat King Cole hits, "Mona Lisa" and "Too Young". He also recorded Yma Sumac's first album: Voice of the Xtabay, which can be considered one of the first recordings of exotica. In 1951, he made the original recording of "Quiet Village", which years later became a hit for Martin Denny. In 1953, he scored his first movie, the sailing travelogue Tanga Tika.

With his own orchestra, he released a number of hits, including "Ruby" (1953), "Unchained Melody" (1955), and "The Poor People of Paris" (1956), and is remembered for a version of "Sinner Man" (1956), definitively setting the sound with varying tempos, orchestral flourishes, and wailing background vocals. "Unchained Melody" was the first million seller for Baxter and was awarded a gold disc. "The Poor People of Paris" also sold over one million copies. He also achieved success with concept albums of his own orchestral suites: Le Sacre Du Sauvage, Festival Of The Gnomes, Ports Of Pleasure, and Brazil Now, the first three for Capitol and the fourth on Gene Norman's Crescendo label. The list of musicians on these recordings includes Plas Johnson and Clare Fischer.

In the 1960s, he formed Les Baxter's Balladeers, a conservative folk group in suits that at one time featured a young David Crosby. Later, he used some of the same singers from that group for a studio project called The Forum. They had a minor hit in 1967 with their song "The River Is Wide", which implemented the Wall of Sound technique originally developed by Phil Spector. He worked in radio as musical director of The Halls of Ivy and the Bob Hope and Abbott and Costello shows.

Baxter worked in films in the 1960s and 1970s. He worked on movie scores for B-movie studio American International Pictures where he composed scores for Roger Corman's Edgar Allan Poe films and other horror and beach party films including House of Usher, The Pit and the Pendulum, The Raven, Muscle Beach Party and Beach Blanket Bingo. He also composed a new score for the theatrical release of the 1970 horror film Cry of the Banshee after AIP rejected Wilfred Josephs's original one. Howard W. Koch recalled that Baxter composed, orchestrated and recorded the entire score of The Yellow Tomahawk (1954) in a total of three hours for $5,000. When soundtrack work fell off in the 1980s, he scored music for theme parks such as SeaWorld.

== Death ==
Baxter died in Newport Beach, California at the age of 73. He was buried at Pacific View Memorial Park, in Corona del Mar, California.

== Controversy ==
According to Milt Bernhart, Nelson Riddle was a ghostwriter for Baxter when Baxter was working for Nat King Cole, although while Baxter was working and was credited as a conductor for Nat King Cole, he never was officially credited as a composer or arranger. Bernhart states that Riddle told him that Baxter did not write the material on his exotica albums. Bernhart states that, while working for Baxter on recording a score for a Roger Corman film, it was apparent that Baxter could not conduct competently and "couldn't read the scores." According to Bernhart, "Someone else had written [the music]." However, Baxter went on to write symphonies for the Los Angeles Philharmonic and guest conduct at the Hollywood Bowl.

Riddle held a grudge against Baxter for supposedly taking credit for Riddle's arrangements on two Nat King Cole hit recordings. According to André Previn, when collaborating once with Baxter, in the time Previn and Riddle had finished their parts, Baxter had written just one bar for woodwinds and included a note for the oboe that does not exist on the instrument.

Gene Lees stated that the exotica albums were written by Albert Harris and the material recorded with Yma Sumac was written by Pete Rugolo. According to Rugolo, he was paid $50 per arrangement to ghost for Les Baxter and that he "did a whole album with Yma Sumac".

In a 1981 interview with Soundtrack magazine, Baxter said these sorts of statements were the results of a smear campaign by a disgruntled orchestrator. According to Baxter, this resulted in Baxter being denied the chance to score for a major motion picture. The job went instead to Baxter's friend Bronisław Kaper. Baxter said that he would give his compositions to orchestrators to arrange in order to cope with his hectic schedule.

Baxter's frequent conductor and orchestrator Hall Daniels said the criticisms were the result of "sour grapes" by people who held a grudge against Baxter for one reason or another.

Skip Heller spent time working for and studying under Baxter where he witnessed various score sheets of original Baxter compositions, including Yma Sumac's "Xtabay" and "Tumpa". According to Heller, they were all in Baxter's own handwriting.

The Les Baxter papers, housed at the University of Arizona show a significant number of arrangements in his own hand.

== Awards ==
Baxter has a motion picture star on the Hollywood Walk of Fame at 6314 Hollywood Blvd.

== Selected filmography ==
- The Black Sleep (1956)
- Rebel in Town (1956)
- Wetbacks (1956)
- A Woman's Devotion (1956)
- Voodoo Island (1957)
- Pharaoh's Curse (1957)
- Untamed Youth (1957)
- The Invisible Boy (1957)
- The Dalton Girls (1957)
- The Lone Ranger and the Lost City of Gold (1958)
- The Fiend Who Walked the West (1958)
- Macabre (1958)
- House of Usher (1960)
- The Pit and the Pendulum (1961)
- Master of the World (1961)
- Panic in Year Zero! (1962)
- Tales of Terror (1962)
- The Young Racers (1963)
- The Raven (1963)
- The Comedy of Terrors (1963)
- X: The Man with the X-ray Eyes (1963)
- Beach Party (1963)
- Muscle Beach Party (1964)
- Bikini Beach (1964)
- Pajama Party (1964)
- Beach Blanket Bingo (1965)
- How to Stuff a Wild Bikini (1965)
- Sergeant Deadhead (1965)
- Dr. Goldfoot and the Bikini Machine (1965)
- The Ghost in the Invisible Bikini (1966)
- Fireball 500 (1966)
- Wild in the Streets (1968)
- The Mini-Skirt Mob (1968)
- Target: Harry (1969)
- Hell's Belles (1969)
- Flareup (1969)
- The Dunwich Horror (1970)
- Cry of the Banshee (1970)
- Frogs (1972)
- Baron Blood (1972 - US soundtrack)
- I Escaped from Devil's Island (1973)
- The Devil and LeRoy Bassett (1973)
- Savage Sisters (1974)
- Switchblade Sisters (1975)
- Born Again (1978)
- The Beast Within (1982)
- Lightning in a Bottle (1993)

== Discography ==
=== Albums, soundtracks and compilations ===
  - Albums through Wild Guitars, Capitol Records; 'OST' indicates 'original soundtrack.'
- (1947) Music Out of the Moon (composed by Harry Revel)
- (1948) Perfume Set To Music (composed by Harry Revel) (No. 7 on Billboard)
- (1950) Yma Sumac: Voice of the Xtabay
- (1951) Arthur Murray Favorites: Tangos
- (1951) Ritual of the Savage (Le sacre du sauvage)
- (1953) Festival of the Gnomes (composed by Camillo Ruspoli, 2nd Prince of Candriano)
- (1954) Thinking of You
- (1954) The Passions (featuring Bas Sheva)
- (1954) Arthur Murray: Modern Waltzes
- (1955) Kaleidoscope
- (1955) Tamboo! (No. 6 on Billboard)
- (1956) Les Baxter's La Femme
- (1956) Caribbean Moonlight
- (1957) Skins! Bongo Party with Les Baxter
- (1957) 'Round the World with Les Baxter
- (1957) Midnight on the Cliffs
- (1957) Ports of Pleasure
- (1957) Pharaoh's Curse (aka) Curse of the Pharaoh
- (1958) Space Escapade
- (1958) Selections from Rodgers and Hammerstein's South Pacific
- (1958) Confetti
- (1958) Love is a Fabulous Thing
- (1959) Les Baxter's African Jazz
- (1959) Les Baxter's Jungle Jazz
- (1959) Les Baxter's Wild Guitars
- (1959) Barbarian (Goliath and the Barbarians) [OST] (American International Records)
- (1960) The Sacred Idol [OST] (Capitol Records)
- (1960) House of Usher / The Fall of the House of Usher [OST]
- (1960) Les Baxter's Teen Drums (Capitol Records)
- (1960) Young Pops (Capitol Records)
- (1961) Broadway '61 (Capitol Records)
- (1961) Alakazam the Great [OST] (Vee Jay Records)
- (1961) Jewels of the Sea (Capitol Records)
- (1961) Master of the World [OST] (Vee Jay Records)
- (1962) Sensational! (Capitol Records)
- (1962) Voices in Rhythm (Reprise Records)
- (1962) The Primitive and the Passionate (Reprise Records)
- (1962) The Fabulous Sounds of Les Baxter: Strings, Guitars, Voices! (Pickwick Records)
- (1963) Les Baxter's Balladeers (Reprise Records)
- (1963) The Academy Award Winners (Reprise Records)
- (1963) The Soul of the Drums (Reprise Records)
- (1966) Brazil Now (GNP Crescendo)
- (1967) Love is Blue (GNP Crescendo)
- (1967) African Blue (GNP Crescendo)
- (1968) Moog Rock (GNP Crescendo)
- (1968) Hell's Belles [OST] (Sidewalk Records)
- (1969) Bora Bora [OST] (American International Records)
- (1969) Bugaloo in Brazil (KPM Music)
- (1970) Cry of the Banshee [OST] (Citadel Records)
- (1971) Music of the Devil God Cult: Strange Sounds from Dunwich – The Dunwich Horror [OST] (American International Records)
- (1973) Black Sabbath (1963 film) [OST] (Bax Records)
- (1978) Born Again [OST] (Lamb & Lion Records)

=== Singles ===
All released under Capitol Records:

- (1951) "Because of You"
- (1952) "Blue Tango"
- (1952) "Lonely Wine"
- (1953) "April in Portugal"
- (1953) "Ruby"
- (1953) "I Love Paris"
- (1954) "The High and the Mighty"
- (1955) "Unchained Melody"
- (1955) "Medic"
- (1955) "Wake the Town and Tell the People"
- (1956) "Foreign Intrigue"
- (1956) "The Poor People of Paris"
- (1956) "Tango of the Drums"
- (1956) "Giant"
- (1959) "Dance, Everyone Dance"
- (1960) "Pepe"

=== Compilations ===
- (1960) Baxter's Best (compilation) (Capitol Records)
- (1995) The Lost Episode of Les Baxter (1961 recording) (Dionysus Records)
- (1996) By Popular Request (Dionysus Records)
- (1996) The Exotic Moods of Les Baxter (Capitol Records)
- (1998) Best of Les Baxter (EMI-Capitol Special Markets)

=== Anthologies ===
With various artists:

- (1961) Wild Hi-Fi Drums / Wild Stereo Drums (Capitol Records)
- (1969) All the Loving Couples [OST], one track (United Artists Records)

=== Arrangements for other artists ===
The Forum:

- (1967) The River is Wide (Mira Records)

101 Strings:

- (1970) Million Seller Hits (Alshire Records)
- (1970) Que Mango! (Alshire Records)
- (1975) Movie Themes (Alshire Records)
- (1975) Hit Songs from Spain (Alshire Records)
