= Augie Colon =

American percussionist (1927–2004)

Augie Colón
- Born: August Borero Colón; August 22,1927; Honolulu, Hawaii
- Died: June 4, 2004 (age 76) Honolulu, Hawaii
- Genres: Exotica
- Occupation: Musician
- Instruments: Bongos, congas, bird calls
- Label: Liberty Records

August "Augie" Borero Colón (August 27, 1927 ‒ June 4, 2004) was an American musician known for his work as a percussionist in the exotica genre. He came to national fame as a member of Martin Denny's band in the 1950s and was the voice behind the bird calls and jungle sounds of the hit single "Quiet Village". He also recorded two solo albums, Sophisticated Savage (1959) and Chant of the Jungle (1960). In the early 1960s, Colón left Denny's group and toured with his own band known as The Tropicales.

Colón was born in Honolulu in 1927 and died in that city in 2004.

== Discography ==
=== Solo albums ===
- Sophisticated Savage, Liberty LRP-3101 (1959)
- Chant of the Jungle, Liberty LRP-3148/LST-7148 (1960)

=== Martin Denny albums ===
- Exotica, Liberty LRP-3034 (mono) (1957)
- Exotica, Liberty LST-7034 (stereo) (1958) - re-recorded for stereo with Julius Wechter replacing Arthur Lyman
- Exotica Vol.2, Liberty LRP-3077/LST-7006 (1958)
- Forbidden Island, Liberty LRP-3081/LST-7001 (1958)
- Primitiva, Liberty LRP-3087/LST-7023 (1958)
- Hypnotique, Liberty LRP-3102/LST-7102 (1959)
- Afro-Desia, Liberty LRP-3111/LST-7111 (1959)
- Exotica Volume III, Liberty LRP-3116/LST-7116 (1959)
- Quiet Village: The Exotic Sounds of Martin Denny, Liberty LRP-3122/LST-7122 (1959)
