= Forbidden Island (album) =

Album

Studio album by Martin Denny
- Released: May 1958
- Recorded: March 1958
- Genre: Exotica; world; easy listening
- Label: Liberty Records
- Producer: Si Waronker – producer

Martin Denny chronology
Exotica Vol. II (1958)	Forbidden Island (1958)	Primitiva (1958)

Professional ratings
Review scores
Source	Rating
Allmusic	4 /5 stars

Forbidden Island was the third album by Martin Denny. The album was produced in March 1958 at the Liberty Studios in Hollywood, following the group's nine-month gig performing at Don the Beachcomber's Bora Bora Lounge in Hawaii. Forbidden Island was Denny's first album to be recorded and released after vibraphonist Arthur Lyman left the group to pursue his own solo career. The album includes four original compositions by Denny: "Cobra", "Exotica", "Primitiva", and "Forbidden Island".

Upon its release in May 1958, Billboard awarded the album four stars and wrote: "Interesting treatment of exotic original and standards . . . produced provocative sound. Good off-beat jockey wax."

Richie Unterberger, in a review for AllMusic.com gave the album four stars and noted that it mixed "island sounds, easy listening, and Asian/world music accents."

Australian critic John Masters wrote in December 1959 that high fidelity addicts may enjoy Denny's "conglomeration of weird and wonderful imitations of tropical rhythms" and opined that, although "most of the content . . . is sugar coated trash, the recorded sound is outstanding and for this reason the disc is commended, as a technical showpiece only, to stereophiles."

== Track listing ==
=== Side A ===
1. "Cobra" (Martin Denny) – 3:01
2. "Port au Prince" (Les Baxter) – 2:07
3. "Exotica" (Martin Denny) – 3:00
4. "Little China Doll" (Dave Snell) – 2:38
5. "Bali Hai" (Richard Rodgers, Oscar Hammerstein) – 2:55
6. "Narcissus Queen" (R. A. Anderson) – 2:25

=== Side B ===
1. "Sim Sim" (Les Baxter) – 3:03
2. "Goony Birds" (Julius Wechter) – 2:13
3. "Primitiva" (Martin Denny) – 2:30
4. "March of the Siamese Children" (Richard Rodgers) – 2:43
5. "Sukura" (Dai Keong Lee) – 2:41
6. "Forbidden Island" (Martin Denny) – 2:56

== Personnel ==
=== Band members ===
- Martin Denny – piano, celeste, arranger, composer
- Augie Colon – Latin instruments, special effects, bird calls, and bongos
- Julius Wechter – vibes, marimba, xylophone, percussion
- Harvey Ragsdale – string bass

=== Guest specialists ===
- Lew Paino – percussion
- Will Brady – flute and musette
- Bud Lee – guitar and Japanese samisen
- Mike Garcia – conga drum

=== Other contributors ===
- Si Waronker – producer
- Garrett-Howard – cover design
- Bob Lang and Ted Keep – engineers
- Sandy Warner – cover model, "the Exotica girl"
- Buck Buchwach – liner notes
