= Life Cycle (Sakerock album) =

Studio album by Sakerock
- Released: June 8, 2005
- Studio: Alchemy (Osaka)
- Genre: Exotica; jazz; Latin; American folk
- Length: 45:50
- Label: Kakubarhythm

Sakerock chronology
Ian Ryokō (2004)	Life Cycle (2005)	Songs of Instrumental (2006)

Singles from Life Cycle
- 1. "Ana o Horu" / "2, 3-nin" Released: January 11, 2005

Life Cycle (Japanese pronunciation: [ɾaꜜiɸɯ saꜜikɯrɯ]) is the second studio album by Japanese instrumental band Sakerock. It was released on June 8, 2005, as their first full album under indie label Kakubarhythm. All four members share writing credits, though the majority of tracks were written by leader and guitarist Gen Hoshino and bassist Kei Tanaka. With the departure of keyboardist Takuji Nomura, the band shifted the center of their melodies to trombone played by new member Kenta Hamano, who had previously served as a supporting member on flute and sax. Four guest performers are featured on the album, including tapdancer and actor Mirai Moriyama. Themed around daily life, it is an exotica album that incorporates elements of jazz, Latin, and American folk music.

The album was preceded by a double A-side single, "Ana o Horu" / "2, 3-nin", on January 11, 2005. Upon the release of Life Cycle, Sakerock performed a tour in western Japan and held shows at the Club Quattro live house, which was compiled onto the DVD Gūzen no Kiroku in November 2005. Though it did not chart, the album was received positively by music critics, who enjoyed its style and fusion of genres. A lyrical cover of "Ana o Horu" was recorded by Hoshino for his debut solo album Baka no Uta in 2010, and also featured on that album's touring effort.

== Background and development ==
Sakerock was formed in October 2000 by students of the Jiyu no Mori Gakuen Junior and Senior High School in Hannō, Saitama, at the initiative of frontman and guitarist Gen Hoshino. It initially consisted of Hoshino, drummer Daichi Itō, bassist Kei Tanaka, and keyboardist Takuji Nomura, who would gather at a classical music cafe in Nakano, Tokyo. They invited Kenta Hamano, who declined in order to focus on work as a vocalist, but still acted as a supporting member, playing flute and sax. Named after the Martin Denny song "Sake Rock" (1959), the band performed instrumental exotica and lounge-styled songs that incorporated elements of kayōkyoku.

Before performing live, Sakerock produced one hundred copies of an eponymous demo album in 2002 in collaboration with Mihoko Kamimura of the band Momonashi for vocals, which were placed over melodies based on keyboards and the traditional Japanese kokyū. They spent half a year recording their debut studio album Yuta (2003) at a bar in Kunitachi, Tokyo, which they described as their first form and "zeroth album". Nomura departed the band shortly before the album's release and Hamano officially joined as a trombonist. After joining Compare Notes, a record label run by editors of the music magazine Map, they recorded the mini-album Ian Ryokō within two days at a studio in Osaka. Lacking a keyboardist, they shifted the center of their melodies to Hamano, who would also become their mascot of sorts, appearing on the front of covers and their website. Invited by the record owner, Sakerock joined the line-up of indie label Kakubarhythm, who then co-released Ian Ryokō with Compare Notes in 2004. By the announcement of Life Cycle, they had built a reputation within the live house scene.

== Writing and production ==
"Ana o Horu"
"Ana o Horu", the lead single and second track of Life Cycle. With the departure of Nomura, the band shifted the front of their melodies from keyboard to Hamano's trombone. Written by Hoshino, the song features the trombone in the place of where vocals would be used.

Life Cycle was written about daily life; Hoshino said it embodies "insignificant, interesting livelihood". Out of 13 tracks, Hoshino composed six ("Seikatsu", "Ana o Horu", "Old Old York", Hima to Ame", "Sam", "Korosu na", "Senshu") and Tanaka composed four ("Hiraki Naori", "Happy End", "2, 3-nin", "Tsuwamono Nikki"). They co-wrote "Bon Umauma-kun no Rap" with Itō, and Hoshino co-wrote the medley "Mata Kite ne, Kyoto" with Hamano. Since Hoshino had previously sang during acoustic live performances, he wrote his songs with a lyrical-like melody and had Hamano "sing" with trombone. In addition to his usual ad lib scat singing, Hamano performs freestyle rap vocals on "Bon Umauma-kun no Rap". Pedal steel guitarist Ren Takada, marimba player Takeo Toyama, acoustic guitarist Ryo Takematsu, and tapdancer Mirai Moriyama are featured as guest performers on certain tracks.

The album was recorded at Alchemy Studio in Osaka City. Unlike Yuta and Ian Ryokō – which had been produced at home or with limited time – Life Cycle was their first album recorded steadily. It is an exotica album that incorporates genres such as jazz, Latin, and American folk / roots. Hiro Murao, editing an interview with Sakerock for Bounce magazine, described the album as "foot-worked funk beats" and "drunken jazz", with feelings of punk and pop.

== Release and reception ==
On January 11, 2005, Sakerock released "Ana o Horu" and "2, 3-nin" as a double A-side single. They announced Life Cycle on March 22, 2005, and were reported to have finished production by April. As the sole label, Kakubarhythm released the album on June 8, 2005. To commemorate the release, the band embarked on the tour Sakerock Chindochu @ Nishinihon (サケロック珍道中@西日本, lit. 'Sakerock's Incident-Filled Journey @ Western Japan') and performed at the Club Quattro live house. A DVD recording of the performances was announced on September 9, 2005, under the working title Tabi de Deatta Guzen-tachi (旅で出会った偶然達, lit. 'The Coincidences We Met During the Trip'). By Kakubarhythm, it was released under a renewed title of Gūzen no Kiroku (ぐうぜんのきろく, lit. 'Chance Log') on November 16.

Life Cycle did not appear on the Oricon Albums Chart dated within its week of release, indicating having sold less than the 647 copies of 300th place's Atarashiki Nihongo Rock no Michi to Hikari (2003) by Sambomaster. Despite the lack of commercial success, the album received warm reviews from Japanese music critics, who complimented its style and noted the mixture of genres. The staff of CDJournal called it a high quality sound encompassing jazz, funk, exotica, mondo (Italian for "world"), and American roots. Summarizing the band's atmosphere as "four drunkards", they described the album as pleasant jazz and Latin grooves, mixed with comical scatting and dull horns. Writing for Bounce, reviewer Takao Kito praised the album as showcasing a range of musicality, whilst remaining true to the instrumental genre at its core. He wrote that it composes exotic and funky rhythms, with a pleasant mood in the trombone and marimba contrasted by elements of humor. In a retrospective article for Mikiki covering Sakerock's full discography, Mayumi Tsuchida enjoyed the focus on daily life. She highlighted the group's performance and Hamano's rap vocals.

In the site's profile of the band, the staff of Natalie.mu wrote that Sakerock's appearances in media rose with the album's release and audience for their live performances grew. Kakubarhythm issued a reprint of the album on September 16, 2009. A lyrical cover of "Ana o Horu" was recorded by Hoshino for his solo debut album Baka no Uta in 2010. Itō assisted him on the two-show touring effort, also performing a cover of "Senshu". Life Cycle was not available digitally until September 22, 2021 – 16 years after release and six years after Sakerock's disbandment – when it was released to streaming platforms alongside the rest of the band's albums and singles.

== Personnel ==
Credits adapted from the album liner notes.

Sakerock

- All members – arrangement (all tracks)
- Kenta Hamano – composer (9); lyricist (7); scat, trombone (all tracks)
- Gen Hoshino – composer (1–3, 5, 7, 9–12); acoustic guitar, electric guitar (all tracks)
- Kei Tanaka – composer (4, 6–8, 13); bass (all tracks)
- Daichi Itō – composer (7); drums, percussion (all tracks)

Guest musicians

- Ren Takada – pedal steel guitar (8)
- Takeo Toyama – arrangement, marimba (3)
- Ryo Takematsu – acoustic guitar (13)
- Mirai Moriyama – tapdance (2)

== Track listing ==
Life Cycle track listing
No.	Title	Music	Length
1.	"Seikatsu" (生活, lit. 'Livelihood')	Gen Hoshino	4:08
2.	"Ana o Horu" (穴を掘る, lit. 'Dig a Hole')	Hoshino	2:07
3.	"Old Old York"	Hoshino	3:50
4.	"Hiraki Naori" (開き直り, lit. 'Fighting Back')	Kei Tanaka	2:51
5.	"Hima to Ame" (暇とあめ, lit. 'Free Time and Rain')	Hoshino	4:51
6.	"Happy End"	Tanaka	2:50
7.	"Bon Umauma-kun no Rap" (ボーンうまうまくんのラップ, Bōn Umauma-kun no Rappu, lit. 'Rap of Bon Umauma')	Hoshino; Tanaka; Daichi Itō	3:22
8.	"2, 3-nin" (2，3人, Ni, San-nin, lit. 'Two, Three People')	Tanaka	5:54
9.	"Mata Kite ne, Kyoto" (また来てね / 京都, Mata Kite ne / Kyōto, lit. 'Come Again / Kyoto')	Kenta Hamano; Hoshino	5:54
10.	"Sam" (サム, Samu)	Hoshino	2:19
11.	"Korosu na" (殺すな, lit. 'Don't Kill')	Hoshino	2:15
12.	"Senshu" (選手, lit. 'Sports Player')	Hoshino	3:03
13.	"Tsuwamono Nikki" (兵日記, lit. 'Soldier's Diary')	Tanaka	5:08
Total length:			45:50

CD (bonus track)
No.	Title	Length
14.	"Seikatsu" (Umauma-kun Iiwake Version; うまうまくん言い訳バージョン, Umauma-kun Īwake Bāshon, lit. 'Umauma's Excuse Version')

Notes

- "Hima to Ame" is titled "Shinano-machi" (信濃町, "Shinano") on the original 2005 CD release.
- "Bon Umauma-kun no Rap" features lyrics written and performed by Hamano.
- "Mata Kite ne, Kyoto" is a medley.

== Release history ==
Release dates and formats for Life Cycle
Region	Date	Format(s)	Label	Catalogue code	Ref.
Japan	June 8, 2005	CD	Kakubarhythm	KAKU-013	
Japan	September 16, 2009	CD (reprint)	Kakubarhythm	DDCK-1014	
Various	September 22, 2021	Digital download; streaming	Kakubarhythm	—	
South Korea	October 1, 2021	Digital download; streaming	Kakubarhythm	—	
