= Primitiva =

Studio album by Martin Denny
- Released: 1958
- Studio: Liberty Studios
- Genre: Exotica
- Length: 28:21
- Label: Liberty Records
- Producer: Si Waronker

Martin Denny chronology
Forbidden Island (1958)	Primitiva (1958)	Hypnotique (1959)

Professional ratings
Review scores
Source	Rating
AllMusic	4/5 stars

Primitiva (LRP-3087/LST-7023) is the fourth studio album by Martin Denny. Released in August 1958, it was recorded at Liberty Studios in Hollywood and released on Liberty Records. In October 1958, it reached No. 27 on the national Cashbox chart.

In a review on AllMusic.com, Richie Unterberger gave the album four stars and praised it for the variety of instruments used: "Say what you will about the cheesiness of this pseudo-world music, Denny deserves some sort of credit for bringing instruments like the m'bira, Burmese gongs, koto, Buddhist prayer bowls, and 'primitive log from New Guinea' into the mainstream."

Upon the album's release, Austin Faricy wrote in the Honolulu Star-Bulletin: "It is no more primitive than a Salvador Dalí painting, but it is persuasive, and we warrant that if you play it in the privacy of your boudoir, you will find yourself dancing your own secret idea of the exotic."

== Track listing ==
=== Side A ===
1. "Burma Train" (Martin Denny, Hal Johnson) – 2:59
2. "Kalua" (Ken Darby) – 2:35
3. "M'Gambo Mambo" (Jerry D. Williams) – 2:05
4. "Buddhist Bells" (Martin Denny, Hal Johnson) – 3:00
5. "M'Bira" (Martin Denny) – 2:50
6. "Flamingo" (Edmund Anderson, Ted Grouya) – 2:40

=== Side B ===
1. "Llama Serenade (Peruvian Llama Song)" (Charles Wolcott) – 2:15
2. "Akaka Falls" (Helen Parker) – 2:50
3. "Bangkok Cockfight" (Les Baxter) – 2:15
4. "Dites Moi" (Richard Rodgers, Oscar Hammerstein II) – 2:37
5. "Jamaica Farewell" (Lord Burgess) – 2:15

== Personnel ==
=== Musicians and singers ===
- Martin Denny – piano, celeste, arranger, composer
- Augie Colon – bongos, congas, percussion, bird calls
- Julius Wechter – vibes, marimbas, percussion
- Harvey Ragsdale – string bass, marimbula
- Roy Hart – percussion
- Tak Shindo – koto
- Jerry Williams – mallets, percussion

=== Other contributors ===
- Si Waronker – producer
- Garrett-Howard – cover design
- Ted Keep – engineer
- Sandy Warner – cover model
- Les Baxter – liner notes
