= Quiet Village: The Exotic Sounds of Martin Denny =

Studio album by Martin Denny
- Released: August 1959
- Genre: Exotica; space age pop
- Label: Liberty Records
- Producer: Si Waronker

Martin Denny chronology
Exotica Volume III	Quiet Village: The Exotic Sounds of Martin Denny	The Enchanted Sea

Professional ratings
Review scores
Source	Rating
Allmusic	4.5 /5 stars

Quiet Village: The Exotic Sounds of Martin Denny is the eighth studio album by Martin Denny. Released in the summer of 1959, the monophonic version of the album (LRP 3122) reached No. 21 on the Billboard monophonic album chart in November 1959, and the stereophonic version (LST 7122) reached No. 12 on the magazine's stereophonic album chart in January 1960.

== Track listing ==
=== Side A ===
1. "Stranger in Paradise" (George Forrest) – 2:19
2. "Hawaiian War Chant" (Prince Leleiohoku) – 2:14
3. "Coronation" (Les Baxter) – 2:49
4. "Sake Rock" – 1:57
5. "Paradise Found" – 2:28
6. "Firecracker" – 2:26

=== Side B ===
1. "Martinique" – 2:53
2. "My Little Grass Shack in Kealakekua, Hawaii Cha Cha Cha" – 1:56
3. "Tune from Rangoon" – 2:58
4. "Happy Talk" (Richard Rodgers, Oscar Hammerstein II) – 2:24
5. "Pagan Love Song" – 2:23
6. "Laura" (David Raksin, Johnny Mercer) – 2:55
7. "Quiet Village" – 3:37

== Personnel ==
=== Musicians/performers ===
- Martin Denny – piano, celeste, arranger, composer
- Augie Colon – bongos, congas, bird calls
- Julius Wechter – vibes, marimba, percussion
- Harvey Ragsdale – string bass, marimbula
- Raymond Alexander – percussion
- Jose Bethancourt (né José P. Bethancourt; 1906–1978) – percussion
- John Frigo – string bass

=== Other contributors ===
- Si Waronker – producer
- Ivan Nagy – color photography
- Pate/Francis & Assoc. – cover design
- Sandy Warner – cover model, "the Exotica girl"
- John Sturges – liner notes

== Critical reception ==
Wally George in the Los Angeles Times called the album another of Denny's "slick releases" and noted: "As with the six previous Denny efforts, the music has the charm of the islands or is it, perhaps, the call of the wild? Denny relies almost entirely on percussion instruments to create his illusions, and one of his helpers, August Colon, supplies bird calls. Unless our ears deceive, Mr. Colon has been padding his part. This is not necessarily a criticism, just an observation: at times you get the feeling you're locked in the Griffith Park bird sanctuary."

Tony Wilds on AllMusic.com gave the album 4.5 stars and called it as "representative of the standard Denny oeuvre: birdcall "Polynesian" exotica, Chinese, and Japanese." Wilds described "Little Grass Shack" as "self parody" with a cha-cha-chá beat "punctuated with an absurd duck call instead of the usual birds."

Philadelphia disc jockey Phil Sheridan rated it as his "album choice" in July 1959, described the album as "another assortment of native sounds and intriguing musical patterns", and called Denny "an innovator of original sounds".
