= Exotica Volume II =

Studio album by Martin Denny
- Released: July 1958
- Recorded: June 1957
- Genre: Exotica
- Length: 29:49
- Label: Liberty Records
- Producer: Si Waronker

Martin Denny chronology
Exotica (1957)	Exotica Volume II (1958)	Forbidden Island (1958)

Professional ratings
Review scores
Source	Rating
AllMusic	4.5/5 stars

Exotica Volume II was the second album by Martin Denny, released in 1958.

== Track listing ==
1. "Soshu Night Serenade" (Ryōichi Hattori) – 2:08
2. "Island of Dreams" (Bob Laine, Martin Denny) – 2:53
3. "Japanese Farewell Song (Sayonara)" (Hasegawa Yoshida, Freddy Morgan) – 2:21
4. "Singing Bamboos" (Madeline Lamb) – 2:07
5. "The Queen Chant (E Lili Ua E)" (John Kaladana) – 2:46
6. "Wedding Song" (Ke Kali Ne Au) (Charles E. King) – 2:44
7. "Escales" (Jacques Ibert) – 2:39
8. "When First I Love" (Denny) – 2:22
9. "August Bells" (Gil Baumgart, Denny) – 2:14
10. "Bacoa" (Les Baxter) – 1:59
11. "Ebb Tide" (Robert Maxwell) – 3:11
12. "Rush Hour in Hong Kong" (Abram Chasins) – 1:58

== Personnel ==
- Martin Denny – piano, celeste, arrangements
- Arthur Lyman – vibes, marimba, xylophone, percussion
- Augie Colon – bongos, congas, Latin effects, bird calls
- Bernard Miller – string bass
- Jack Shoop – alto flute, baritone saxophone
- Roy Harte – drums, percussion
- Gil Baumgart – arranger, percussion
- Si Waronker – producer
- Ted Keep – engineer
- Val Valentin – engineer (uncredited)
- Garrett-Howard – cover design
- Sandy Warner – cover model
