= Robert Drasnin =

American composer and clarinet player (1927–2015)

- Born: November 17, 1927
- Died: May 13, 2015 (aged 87); Tarzana, Los Angeles, California
- Occupations: Composer, musician
- Era: Contemporary
- Spouse: Marlene Waters (m. 1956)
- Children: 3

Robert Jackson Drasnin (November 17, 1927 – May 13, 2015) was an American composer and clarinet player.

Robert Drasnin was born on November 17, 1927, in Charleston, West Virginia. At an early age Drasnin was interested in the clarinet so he took lessons but when his family moved to Los Angeles he wasn't able to start until 1938. He attended Franklin Avenue Grammar School in East Hollywood and then Thomas Starr King Junior High and eventually Los Angeles High School in which he joined the American Federation of Musicians. Drasnin joined the United States Army after graduation and served during the Korean War.

Dionysus Records announced that Robert Drasnin died on May 13, 2015.

Robert Drasnin died Wednesday, May 13, 2015 at Providence Tarzana Medical Center, in Tarzana, Los Angeles neighborhood, California. He was 87. Death was due to complications from a recent fall.

== Career ==
Robert Drasnin spent the vast majority of his career in music composing for films and television shows. He composed or supervised scores for well over 100 films and TV shows.

In 1955 Drasnin scored the film Teenage Devil Dolls, and his other film scores included Ride in the Whirlwind (1966), Picture Mommy Dead (1966), Daughter of the Mind (1969), The Kremlin Letter (1970), Crowhaven Farm (1970), The Old Man Who Cried Wolf (1970), Dr. Cook's Garden (1971), A Taste of Evil (1971), The Candy Snatchers (1973), Crisis in Mid-Air (1979) and Love, Mary (1985). Drasnin also scored incidental music for such notable TV shows as The Twilight Zone, Mission: Impossible, Wild, Wild West, Hawaii Five-0, Time Tunnel, Lost In Space, Mannix, The Man From U.N.C.L.E. and Voyage To The Bottom of the Sea.

Robert Drasnin served as music supervisor at CBS for such TV shows as Gunsmoke, Wagon Train, The Twilight Zone and a host of made for TV movies.

In 1959 Robert Drasnin received his M.A. in music from UCLA in Los Angeles. That same year, while working at Tops Records, Drasnin was approached by David Pell, the head of the label, to create an Exotica album. Pell wanted a record that would cash in on the popularity of the Exotica genre made popular by Martin Denny and Arthur Lyman. Drasnin created 12 original compositions and would spend the later part of 1959 recording the record, originally released under the title Voodoo: Exotic Music From Polynesia And The Far East. Among the musical personnel was a young pianist by the name of John Williams who would later go on to score such notable films as Star Wars and Jaws. The LP was released on Tops/Mayfair records in both mono and stereo versions. The cover artwork for the LP featured a photo of a woman in a leopard print bikini dancing as two loin cloth-clad men play bongos in a dark jungle-like setting, bathed in red light. The original cover art was not used in the two different compact disc reissues of the album.

After Army service during the Korean War, he returned to UCLA as a graduate student and became associate conductor of the UCLA Symphony. During the 1950s he also played with the Tommy Dorsey orchestra and Red Norvo's quintet. In 1977 he became Director of Music for the CBS Network.

In 2002, three selections from the 1959 Voodoo album were used in the soundtrack for the documentary film Cinemania: "Desire", "Jardine de la Noche" and "Chant of the Moon".

In 2005 Robert Drasnin was personally invited by Tiki Road Trip author James Teitelbaum to perform at The Hukilau, a 3-day Tiki culture festival in Ft. Lauderdale, Florida. A 12-piece orchestra was assembled by Teitelbaum under Drasnin's guidance for the performance. The show consisted of selections from his 1959 album Voodoo as well as new Exotica-styled music that he composed after Voodoo. These new pieces would form the basis of the Voodoo II album, released in 2007.

In 2007 Robert Drasnin recorded and released Voodoo II, a follow-up album to his 1959 recording Voodoo. The initial recording was made in February, 2007, at Pierce College in the San Fernando Valley of Los Angeles, California. The orchestra was recorded live to multi-track digital hard disk using Digital Performer recording software and Mark of the Unicorn (MOTU) digital interfaces. The CD was produced by Skip Heller and released on Dionysus records in June 2007. Immediately following the release of Voodoo II, Robert Drasnin again performed at the Hukilau event with an orchestra similar to the 2005 lineup. The 2007 performance comprised compositions from both the Voodoo and Voodoo II releases.

He was inducted into the West Virginia Music Hall of Fame in 2008.

Drasnin was also active as an educator, teaching film scoring, orchestration and music theory at Cal State Northridge from 1976 to 1991 and in the Film Scoring program of UCLA Extension from 1993 through 2014. Bob was a member of the Society of Composers and Lyricists (Hollywood chapter) for many years.

== Personal life ==
Robert Drasnin was married to the former Marlene Waters from 1956 up until his death of complications from a fall in Tarzana, California. They had three children: Morgen, Jennifer, and a son Michael.

== Discography ==
=== Albums as a composer ===
- Voodoo (1959), Tops/Mayfair Records, vinyl [9679S] Stereo
- Chant of The Moon/Voodoo 45 RPM single (1959), Tops [45-S 316] Stereo
- Percussion Exotique (1960), Tops Records vinyl [L-1694], retitled issue of Voodoo with different cover artwork
- Voodoo CD Reissue (1996), Dionysus Records, reissued from a virgin LP master with different cover artwork by artist Shag.
- Exotic Excursion (October, 1996), Pickwick Records. CD reissue of Voodoo from the original master tapes. NOTE: only 10 of the original 12 tracks were presented on this CD release.
- Voodoo II (2007), Dionysus Records, CD
- Voodoo III (2015), Dionysus Records. Limited edition CD sold at Tiki Oasis 15 and online by Dionysus. Drasnin asked Skip Heller to complete his works and turn them into a releasable album. Twelve songs were completed by Heller for the release which featured cover art by Claudette Barjoud, designed by Thomas Kimball.

=== Albums as a musician ===
- It's New, It's Nice, It's Norvo (1956) (by the Red Norvo Quintet)
- Ken Hanna and his Orchestra
- Blues at Norm's (1963)
- Norvo...Naturally! (1957)
- Vibe-Rations (1956)
- "Couch, Los Angeles", Skip Heller, Mouthpiece Records, CD, R. Drasnin: clarinet
- "The Blue Dahlia" (2000), Stardust Records, CD, Robert Drasnin: Flute & Clarinet
- "Homegoing", Skip Heller (2002), Innova Records, CD, R. Drasnin: flut * alto saxophone
- "Man From U.N.C.L.E., Volume 2" (2003), Film Score Monthly, limited edition 2-CD set—limited to 3000 copies
- Jewbilee (2005)
- "Lost in Space - 40th Anniversary Edition" (2006), La La Land Records, 2-CD set contains at least 3 cues composed by Drasnin
- "Lua-O-Milo", Skip Heller, (2009), Dionysus Records, CD

== See also ==
- Martin Denny
- Arthur Lyman
- Exotica
- Tiki culture

== Television scores (partial) ==
"Episode(s)" denotes the listing may be incomplete.

| Year | Title | Info | On CD? |
|---|---|---|---|
| 1962 | The Twilight Zone | Episode: "The Hunt"; Airdate: January 26, 1962 | NO |
| 1963 | Great Adventure | Episode(s): "President Vanishes" | NO |
| 1965-66 | The Wild Wild West | "The Night of the Deadly Bed" (season 1) "The Night The Wizard Shook The Earth" (season 1) "Night of the Casual Killer" (season 1) "The Night of the Man-Eating House" (season 2) | YES |
| 1967 | I Spy | "The Seventh Captain" | NO |
| 1967 | Voyage to the Bottom of the Sea | "The Wax Men" | YES |
| 1967 | Custer | Episode(s): "Accused" | NO |
| 1969 | Desperate Mission | | NO |
| 1974 | Joe Forrester | Episode(s): | NO |
| 1976 | Serpico | Episode(s): | NO |
| 1977 | CHiPs | All episodes (season 1): "Taking Its Toll"" "Name Your Price"; Music re-used in two other Season 1 episodes. | NO |
