= Hypnotique =

Studio album by Martin Denny
- Released: 1959
- Genre: Exotica
- Label: Liberty Records
- Producer: Si Waronker – producer

Martin Denny chronology
Primitiva (1958)	Hypnotique (1959)	Afro-Desia (1959)

Professional ratings
Review scores
Source	Rating
Allmusic	4.5 /5 stars

Hypnotique is the fifth album by Martin Denny. Released on Liberty Records in 1959, it was recorded in 1958 at the Kamehameha Schools auditorium and at the Liberty Studios in Hollywood.

== Track listing ==
=== Side A ===
1. "Jungle Madness" (Martin Denny, Hal Johnson) – 3:30
2. "On a Little Street in Singapore" (Peter DeRose, Billy Hill) – 2:30
3. "Voodoo Dreams" (Les Baxter) – 2:25
4. "Chinese Lullaby" (R. H. Bowers) – 2:52
5. "Hypnotique" (David M.) – 3:10
6. "St. Louis Blues" (W. C. Handy) – 2:39

=== Side B ===
1. "We Kiss in a Shadow" (Richard Rodgers, Oscar Hammerstein) – 3:00
2. "Summertime" (George Gershwin, DuBose Heyward) – 2:52
3. "Scimitar" (Les Baxter) – 2:30
4. "American in Bali" (Martin Denny) – 2:24
5. "Japanese Sandman" (Richard A. Whiting, Raymond B. Egan) – 1:30

== Personnel ==
=== Musicians and singers ===
- Martin Denny – piano, celeste, arranger, composer
- Augie Colon – bongos, congas, percussion, bird calls
- Julius Wechter – vibes, marimba, percussion
- Harvey Ragsdale – string bass, marimba
- John Mechigashari – Japanese flute, shakuhachi
- Barbara Smith – koto
- Francis "Bud" Lee – shamisen
- The Jack Halloran Singers – vocals

=== Other contributors ===
- Si Waronker – producer
- Garrett-Howard – cover design
- Bob Lang and Ted Keep – engineers
- Sandy Warner – cover model, "the Exotica girl"
- James Michener – liner notes
