= The Blue Hawaiians =

American surf rock group

- Origin: Los Angeles, California, United States
- Genres: Surf rock, exotica
- Years active: 1994–present
- Members: Mark Fontana; Mark Sproull; Gary Brandin
- Past members: Bron Tieman AKA The Crooked Cowboy; Erik Godal "Maxwellvision"

The Blue Hawaiians are a Los Angeles band that combines elements of surf music, exotica and lounge. They formed in 1994 to play at the opening of Hollywood club, The Lava Lounge. They soon gained recognition following appearances on the soundtrack of the television series Friends and the 1996 film Sex. The group has since released several albums which have generally fared well with critics. The band also composed and recorded music for the cartoon series SpongeBob SquarePants, and their song "A Cheat" was featured in an advertisement for Guess Jeans.

The band features bassist/vocalist Mark Fontana (The El Caminos), lead guitarist Mark Sproull, and steel guitarist/rhythm guitarist Gary Brandin (The Vanduras, The Tikiyaki Orchestra, The Hula Girls).

== Discography ==
=== Albums ===
1. Christmas on Big Island (October 24, 1995)
2. Live at the Lava Lounge (August 4, 1997)
3. Sway (March 4, 1998)
4. Savage Night (July 13, 1999)
5. Live at the Lava Lounge 2 (November 15, 2005)

=== Singles ===
1. "Glimpse of Savage Night" (January 26, 1999)

== Television music ==
=== SpongeBob SquarePants ===
1. "Hawaii Bob"
2. "War Blower"
3. "Heat"
4. "Walk"
