= Sakerock =

2000–2015 Japanese band

Background information
- Origin: Saitama, Japan
- Years active: 2000–2015
- Labels: Compare Notes; Kakubarhythm
- Past members: Gen Hoshino; Daichi Itō; Kenta Hamano; Kei Tanaka; Takuji Nomura
- Website: sakerock.com

Sakerock (サケロック, Sakerokku), typeset as SAKEROCK, was an instrumental Japanese band.

Led by Gen Hoshino, the group was formed in 2000 by graduates of a high school in Hannō, Saitama. The band was named after a Martin Denny song and performs uplift, melodic instrumental music influenced by jazz, folk, Latin music and exotica. Over the decade, they released more than 10 albums and mini-albums, including soundtracks for Japanese movies, television dramas and stage plays. They were signed to the Kakubarhythm label.

== Members ==
- Gen Hoshino (星野源, Hoshino Gen) — guitar, marimba
- Daichi Itō (伊藤大地, Itō Daichi) — drums, percussion

Member of Cherry's, Good Dog Happy Men and Killing Floor.

- Kenta "Hamaken" Hamano (浜野謙太, Hamano Kenta) — trombone, scat

Member of Asa-Chang & Blue Hats (ASA-CHANG&ブルーハッツ), Gentle Forest Jazz Band, Killing Floor, Newday and Zainichi Funk (在日ファンク).

- Kei Tanaka (田中馨, Tanaka Kei) — bass, hawaiian guitar

Left on 26 December 2011. Member of Chopiiin (ショピン) and Shugo Tokumaru & The Magic Band (トクマルシューゴ＆ザ・マジックバンド).

- Takuji Nomura (野村卓史, Nomura Takuji) — keyboards

Still acts as a support-member. Member of Goodluck Heiwa (グッドラックヘイワ), Natsumen and Wuja Bin Bin.

Both Gen Hoshino and Kenta Hamano pursue acting careers; together with Kei Tanaka and Daichi Itō, they appeared in Kankurō Kudō's 2009 film The Shonen Merikensack (少年メリケンサック, Shōnen Merikensakku).

== Discography ==
=== Albums ===
- Yuta (2003)
- Yuta (Renewal) (2003)
- Life Cycle (2005)
- Penguin Pull Pale Piles Sound Tracks 「Best」 (2005)
- Tropical Dōchū (トロピカル道中, Toropikaru Dōchū) (2006)

with Asa-Chang and Ren Takada as Sakerock All Stars (サケロックオールスターズ)

- Songs of Instrumental (2006)
- Ojiisan-sensei (おじいさん先生) original soundtrack (2007)
- Penguin Pull Pale Piles #12: Yurameki (ペンギンプルペイルパイルズ#12「ゆらめき」, Pengin Puru Peiruzu #12 Yurameki) original soundtrack (2007)
- Honyarara (ホニャララ) (2008)
- Muda (2010)
- Sayonara (2015)

=== Mini-albums / EPs ===
- Sakerock (2002) (demo)
- Ian Ryokō (慰安旅行) (2004)
- Catchball-ya (キャッチボール屋, Kyatchibōru-ya) original soundtrack (2006)

=== Singles ===
- "Ana o Horu / 2, 3-nin" (穴を掘る / 2、3人) (2004)
- "Kaishain to Ima no Watashi" (会社員と今の私) (2008)

They also contributed music to Isshin Inudō's film Yellow Tears (黄色い涙, Kiiroi Namida) starring Arashi and based on a manga by Shinji Nagashima.

=== Videos ===
- "Gūzen no Kiroku" (ぐうぜんのきろく) (2005)
- "Gūzen no Kiroku 2" (ぐうぜんのきろく2) (2007)
- "Radical Holiday Sono 0" (ラディカルホリデー その0, Radikaru Horidē Sono 0) (2008)
- "Radical Holiday Sono 1" (ラディカルホリデー その1, Radikaru Horidē Sono 1) (2009)
- "Gūzen no Kiroku 3" (ぐうぜんのきろく3) (2009)
- "Gūzen no Kiroku Final" (ぐうぜんのきろくファイナル, Gūzen no Kiroku Fainaru) (2012)
