= Gene Rains =

Jazz vibraphonist

Gene Rains is a vibraphonist and leader of the Gene Rains Group, a jazz quartet from Hawaii that played a musical style known as exotica. Rains' short career spanned the early to the mid-1960s and consisted of 4 LP recordings released on Decca Records and the Vocalion label. These LPs were released during the golden era of Hawaiian and Exotica music and the Tiki culture in the United States. The Gene Rains Group repertoire featured popular Hawaiian and Polynesian Island melodies as well as popular American tunes of the era.

Gene Rains was discovered by Hawaiian crooner of the era, Alfred Apaka. Apaka was the talent director for the Hawaiian Village Hotel in Waikiki, Hawaii. Apaka recruited the Gene Rains Group to perform in the Shell Bar at the Hawaiian Village, which was the hot spot for the Island's top performers, including Martin Denny and Arthur Lyman. It was also Apaka who introduced Rains to Decca Records.

Today, Rains is considered the third man of Exotica, behind Martin Denny and Arthur Lyman. Although he did not achieve the level of renown of Denny or Lyman, Rains' albums nonetheless are textbook examples of the style of Exotica. With the resurgence of the Tiki culture in the late 1990s and into the early 2000s, Gene Rains' albums have become much sought after by collectors of the genre.

In July 2014, Real Gone Music released a compilation CD featuring 19 tracks and containing large portion of each of Rain's three LPs. During the production of the CD, Universal music, the holding company for Decca's catalog, stated that the Gene Rains master tapes had been destroyed in a fire years earlier. As a result, the Real Gone Music team called upon Mark Riddle a/k/a Digitiki to supply the cleanest possible LP transfers. Riddle is the host of a popular Exotica-themed podcast "Quiet Village Podcast". Even though the compilation was LP sourced, the audio is exceptionally clean.

== Discography ==
LPs:

- Lotus Land: Decca Records-catalog no.: DL74064 [1960] (Stereo LP); D4064 (Mono LP)
- Far Across The Sea: Decca Records-catalog no. DL74164 [1961] (Stereo LP); D4164 (Mono LP)
- Rains In The Tropics: Decca Records-catalog no. DL74348 [1962] (Stereo LP); D4348 (Mono LP)
- The Call Of The Tropics: Vocalion Records-catalog no. VL73785 [1962] (Stereo LP)

Call of the Tropics was a compilation album containing tracks from the three previous LPs.

CDs:

- Far Away Lands: The Exotic Music of Gene Rains: Real Gone Music-catalog no.: 6400276 [July, 2014]

== Band personnel ==
- Lotus Land: Gene Rains-vibes; Paul Conrad-piano; Archie Grant-bass & flute; Alan Watanabe-percussion
- Far Across The Sea & Rains In The Tropics: Gene Rains-vibes; Allen Watanabe-drums; Archie Grant, Jr.-bass; Bryon L. Peterson-piano
- The Call Of The Tropics is a compilation featuring selections from the first three LPs

After the release of Lotus Land, pianist Paul Conrad left the Gene Rains Group and released an exotica LP under his own name on the Mahalo Records label. The album was titled Exotic Paradise and is a collector's item.

== See also ==
- Les Baxter
- Decca Records
