= Hypnotic (disambiguation) =

Hypnotic is a class of drugs, commonly known as sleeping pills.

Hypnotic may also refer to:

- Hypnosis, an induced mental state or set of attitudes

== Music ==
- Hypnotic Records, an American independent record label
- Hypnotic (album), by Wild Orchid, 2003
- "Hypnotic" (song), a 2015 song by Zella Day
- Hypnotic, a 2003 album by Thyrane
- Hypnotic, a 2016 album by Wilkinson
- "Hypnotic", a song by Holly Valance from her album State of Mind
- "Hypnotic", a song by Bomfunk Mc's from their album Reverse Psychology
- "Hypnotic", a song by Tweet

== Film and television ==
- Hypnotic (production company)
- Hypnotic (2021 film), a film directed by Matt Angel and Suzanne Coote
- Hypnotic (2023 film), a film directed by Robert Rodriguez
- "Hypnotic" (Smallville), an episode of the American television series Smallville
- Hypnotic, an alternate title for 2002 film Doctor Sleep

== See also ==
- Hypnotic Brass Ensemble, an American jazz group
- Hypnotica (Benny Benassi album), a 2003 album by Benny Benassi
- "Hypnotik", a song by Alesha Dixon from Fired Up
- Hpnotiq, a brand of liqueur
- Hypnotique, a 1959 album by Martin Denny
- HypnotiQ, a 2007 album by Ewa Sonnet
