= Exotic =

Exotic may refer to:

== Mathematics and physics ==
- Exotic R^{4}, a differentiable 4-manifold, homeomorphic but not diffeomorphic to the Euclidean space R^{4}
- Exotic sphere, a differentiable n-manifold, homeomorphic but not diffeomorphic to the ordinary n-sphere
- Exotic atom, an atom with one or more electrons replaced by other negatively charged particles
- Exotic hadron
  - Exotic baryon, bound states of 3 quarks and additional particles
  - Exotic meson, non-quark model mesons
- Exotic matter, a hypothetical concept of particle physics

== Music ==
- "Exotic" (Lil Baby song), 2018
- "Exotic" (Priyanka Chopra song), a 2012 song by Priyanka Chopra featuring Pitbull

== Flora and fauna ==
- Exotic pet
- Exotic Shorthair, a breed of cat
- Exotic species (or introduced species), a species not native to an area

== Other ==
- Exotic dancer, a type of dancer or stripper
- Exotic derivative, a type of financial derivative

== See also ==
- Exoticism
- Exotica (disambiguation)
