= Kirby Allan =

American record producer (1928–2011)

- Born: Sidney Allen Pittman; January 12, 1928; Prescott, Arkansas, U.S.
- Died: June 16, 2011 (aged 83) Mesa, Arizona, U.S.
- Genre: Exotica
- Occupation: Record Producer
- Labels: Bacchus Archives; Dot Records; MAZE Records; Omega Records; Score Records; Tampa Records; Verve Records

Kirby Allan (born Sidney Allen Pittman, January 12, 1928 – June 16, 2011) was an American record producer who is best remembered for his work with Chaino, in the musical genre of Exotica, and the Jungle variant of Tiki culture music. Their collaboration and unusual marketing strategy began with a series of albums in the late 1950s. Those albums (and singles from them) continue to be released as recently as 2016.

== Early life ==
Allan was born on January 12, 1928, in Prescott, Arkansas, to John Allen Pittman and Nettie Anne Stivers-Pittman. He was a World War II veteran who served as a medic in the United States Army. After his military discharge, Allan used his GI Bill to enter the Chicago Conservatory of Music, and he began singing in various Chicago night clubs.

== Career ==
Allan moved to Hollywood during the early 1950s, where he established MAZE Records. He wrote and performed songs such as "Don't You Remember", "My Life, My Love, My All", "Never, Never, Never", "More Bounce To the Ounce", and "Mother Don't 'Llow Rock'n'Roll". He enjoyed a successful career as a nightclub singer and producer, but in the late 1950s, he traveled to Africa, and became enamored with the ceremonial sounds that were used by various tribes of Kenya, and the Gold Coast. His love for this 'Exotica' led him to 'produce' the ceremonial drumming he'd heard.

Upon returning to the United States from Africa, Allan sought out a performer with whom he could produce a sound that was similar, but which was more marketable to American consumers. It was during this search that Allan met Leon Johnson, a bongo player who would come to be known as Chaino. In the years between 1957 and 1959, Allan produced eight albums with Johnson, often at LA's legendary Gold Star Studios.

Allan's production work with Johnson featured repeated, driving rhythms, savage cries, and tribal iconography that was; "intended to trigger the pagan fantasies of the listener". Their first albums included Unbridled Passions Of Love's Eerie Spectre (1957), Jungle Mating Rhythms (1958), and Percussion for Primitive Lovers (1958).

As a marketing strategy, Allan designed LP album liner notes that told the story of 'Chaino'; "...an orphan from a lost tribe in Africa who was taken in by missionaries and brought to the U.S." Johnson was actually born in Philadelphia, Pennsylvania and Allen's literary fiction was reason enough for one music critic to comment that "...(Johnson's)...association with Kirby Allan was a classic case of 1950s, pop marketing gone awry..," while also pointing out his opinion that; "...(Allen's)... albums can be hard to find but usually are good values."

In June 1958, Billboard gave Eyes of the Spectre a four-star review and noted;

A truly unusual sound can be heard on this album. Chaino turns in what amounts to a one-man show on a variety of bongos, congo drums, steel drums, gourds and assorted noisemakers, altho the label's sound work doesn't do it real justice. Rhythms are basically African or Afro-Cuban. In the background, Chaino whistles, wails and occasionally gives a blood-curdling whoop.

Allan would go on to produce five more albums with Johnson. His last album of new material with him was Africana, recorded in 1959, though both Allan and Johnson had small roles as bongo players in Curtis Harrington's 1961 movie, Night Tide with Dennis Hopper, Linda Lawson, and Gavin Muir.

Some interest in Exotica had waned by the early 1970s, but Allan continued to oversee the production of 'Chaino' compilations, re-releases, and cover versions for those who were still interested in the genre. To further his efforts, Allan established the 'Exotica And Beyond' website, and by 2008, three of Allan's LP album covers had received positive reviews on the 'LP Cover Lover' website.

Allan moved to Mesa, Arizona in 1970, and while he remained active in the entertainment industry, he also became a real estate broker and investor. He developed an interest in local politics and he ran for mayor of Mesa, nine times.

== Death ==
Allan died in the early morning hours of June 16, 2011, while helping longtime companion Sigrid Dietrich, escape a fire that consumed his home in Mesa, Arizona. His burial was at Queen of Heaven Cemetery in Mesa. Allan had five children; Jeff, Marc, Eric (deceased 1996), Monique, and Patric.

== Legacy ==
Allan's productions have been reissued many times over the years and compilations that include his works were released as recently as 2016. Though originally produced on vinyl, much of his work has been re-released in modern formats (CD's) and can be found on various music download sites, such as 'iTunes' and 'Spotify'.

In 1999, three of Allan's productions, "Breathing Bongos", "Slave Girl", and "Walking Bongos" were used in the movie, Forces of Nature. In addition, websites that celebrate the Tiki Culture continue to provide resources and information about Allan's work.

== Discography ==
- Kirby Allan / Larry Irwin's Dreamdusters and Gene Garf Orchestra: "Don't You Remember" (1955), Maze 1002; MZ-105.
- Kirby Allen / Larry Irwin's Dreamdusters and Gene Garf Orchestra: "My Life, My Love, My All" (1955), Maze 1002; MZ-106.
- Kirby Allan / Tony Ioanelli and Orchestra: "Never Never Never" (1955), Maze 1004; MZ-109.
- Kirby Allan / Tony Ioanelli and Orchestra: "That's How I Remember You" (1955), Maze 1004; MZ-110.
- Kirby Allan / Lew Raymond Orchestra: "Friendly Persuasion" (1956), Tops R293-49 [Note: just one song for Allan on this 4-song EP].
- Kirby Allan: "Mother Don't 'Llow Rock-'n-Roll" (1956), Maze 1018; MZ-140.
- Kirby Allan: "More Bounce To The Ounce" (1956), Maze 1018; MZ-141.
- Chaino: Unbridled Passions of Love's Eerie Spectre (1957), Spectre SPECTRE-4.
- Chaino: Jungle Mating Rhythms (1958), Verve MGV-2104.
- Chaino: Percussion for Primitive Lovers (1958), Maze MAZ-B-331.
- Chaino: Percussion For Playboys, Volume 1 (1958), Maze MAZ-B-385.
- Chaino: Percussion For Playboys, Volume 2 (1958), Maze MAZ-B-387.
- Chaino: Jungle Rhythms (1958), Score SLP-4027.
- Chaino: Jungle Echoes (1958), Omega Records OSL-7.
- Chaino: Night of the Spectre (1958), Tampa Records TP-4. [Note: reissue/relabel of Unbridled Passions of Love's Eerie Spectre, recorded 1957]
- Chaino: Africana (1959), Dot DLP-25240.
- Chaino: Temptation (1961), Empire Recording Co. V-17
- Chaino: Africana & Beyond! (1998), Dionysus Records/Bacchus Archives BA-1122.
- Kirby Allan Presents Chaino: New Sounds In Rock 'N' Roll (Jungle Rock) (2003), Dionysus Records/Bacchus Archives BA-1183.
- Various Artists: Las Vegas Grind, Pt. 3 (1999), Crypt Crypt-75.
- Various Artists: HEAVYbreathing Vol. 1, The Sounds of Sex: Bite It! (2007), Normal N-293CD.
- Various Artists: Las Vegas Grind, Pt. 3 (2008), Strip-Tease CRSTLP-003.
- Various Artists: Jungle Exotica, Vol. 4 (2015), Swingtime Records [Digital].
- Various Artists: Jungle Exotica, Vol. 5 (2015), Swingtime Records [Digital].
- Various Artists: Jungle Exotica, Vol. 6 (2015), Swingtime Records [Digital].

== See also ==
- Chaino
