= Exotico (disambiguation) =

Exotico may refer to:

- Exótico, a male wrestler in drag
- Exotico (album), an album by Lara & Reyes
- Exotico (Temples album), an album by Temples
- Cruis'n Exotica, a 1999 racing video game
- Exotica Volume II, the follow-up album by Martin Denny
- EXXXOTICA, annual adult-themed event

== See also ==
- Exotica (disambiguation)
