= Exotica (disambiguation) =

Exotica is a musical genre.

Exotica may also refer to:

- Exotica (Martin Denny album), the album that gave the musical genre its name
- Exotica, an album released by Bananarama
- "Exotica", a song by George Benson from the album Songs and Stories
- Exotica (film), the 1994 Atom Egoyan film
- Exotica (book), a book by David Toop on the musical genre Exotica
- Exotica (band), French electro pop duo
- Exotica (bivalve), a genus of bivalve molluscs in the family Tellinidae

== See also ==
- Exotico (disambiguation)
