= Fess Parker =

American actor (1924–2010)

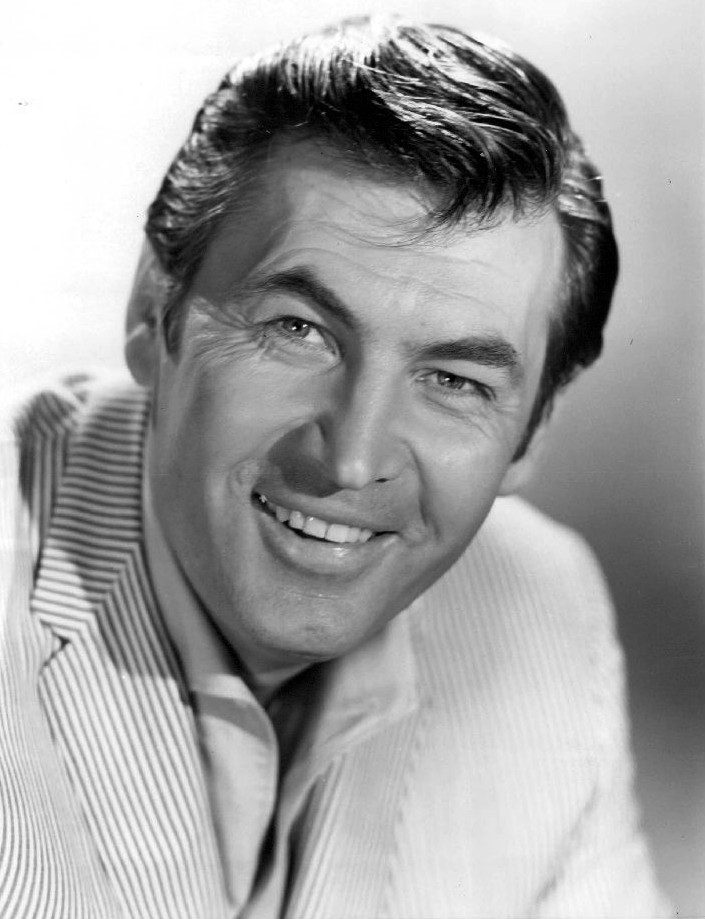
- Parker in 1968
- Born: August 16, 1924; Fort Worth, Texas, U.S.
- Died: March 18, 2010 (aged 85); Santa Ynez, California, U.S.
- Resting place: Santa Barbara Cemetery
- Education: Hardin-Simmons University; University of Texas (BA); University of Southern California (MA)
- Occupations: Actor; singer; winemaker; resort owner-operator
- Years active: 1950–2007
- Known for: Playing Davy Crockett and Daniel Boone; Jim Coates in Old Yeller
- Television: Daniel Boone; Davy Crockett
- Spouse: Marcella Belle Rinehart (m. 1960)
- Children: 2
- Website: fessparker.com

Fess Elisha Parker Jr. (born F. E. Parker Jr.; August 16, 1924 – March 18, 2010) was an American film and television actor best known for his portrayals of the title characters in Walt Disney Productions' television miniseries Davy Crockett (1954–55; ABC) and the television series Daniel Boone (1964–70; NBC).

== Early years ==
Parker was born in Fort Worth, Texas, and raised on a farm in Tom Green County near San Angelo. His father – born Fess Parker but later added the initial "E." – was a tax assessor. The name Fess had been given to him in honor of the educator and politician Simeon D. Fess. Parker decided to change his name from F. E. Parker Jr. to Fess Elisha Parker Jr. He selected the middle name himself, when he was a teenager (about 1937), because it sounded rhythmic and matched his middle initial.

He enlisted in the U.S. Navy in the latter part of the Second World War, hoping to become a pilot. He was turned down because he was too tall at 6 feet 6 inches (1.98 m). He then tried to become a radioman gunner, but he was found too large to fit comfortably into the rear cockpit. He was finally transferred to the United States Marine Corps as a radio operator and shipped out to the South Pacific shortly before the war ended.

Discharged in 1946, he enrolled at Hardin–Simmons University in Abilene, Texas, with assistance from the GI Bill. After an automobile collision, he was stabbed in the neck by the other driver during an argument. He was an active member of the H-SU Players Club and transferred to the University of Texas at Austin in 1947 as a history major and continued to be active in drama. One of his roommates there was the future actor L. Q. Jones. Parker graduated from UT in 1950 with a degree in history. He had been initiated into the Pi Kappa Alpha fraternity. Having one year remaining on his GI Bill benefits, he studied drama at the University of Southern California, where he pursued a master's degree in theater history.

== Career ==
Parker began his show-business career in the summer of 1951 when he had a $32-a-week job as an extra in the play Mister Roberts, although he is credited with the voice of Leslie the chauffeur in the 1950 film Harvey. Within months, he was on location with a minor part in Untamed Frontier with Joseph Cotten and Shelley Winters.

Parker became a contract player with Warner Bros., appearing in small roles in several films such as Springfield Rifle (1952), Island in the Sky, The Bounty Hunter, and Battle Cry. In 1954, he appeared as Grat Dalton in the Jim Davis syndicated Western Stories of the Century in the episode "The Dalton Brothers".

=== Davy Crockett ===
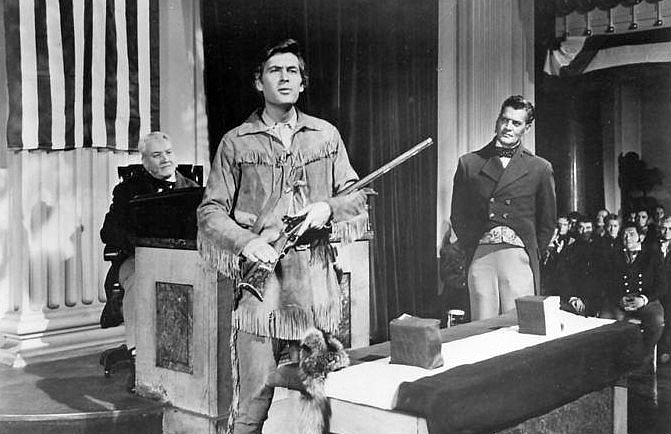
Fess Parker as Davy Crockett addresses the city of Philadelphia in the Walt Disney television miniseries

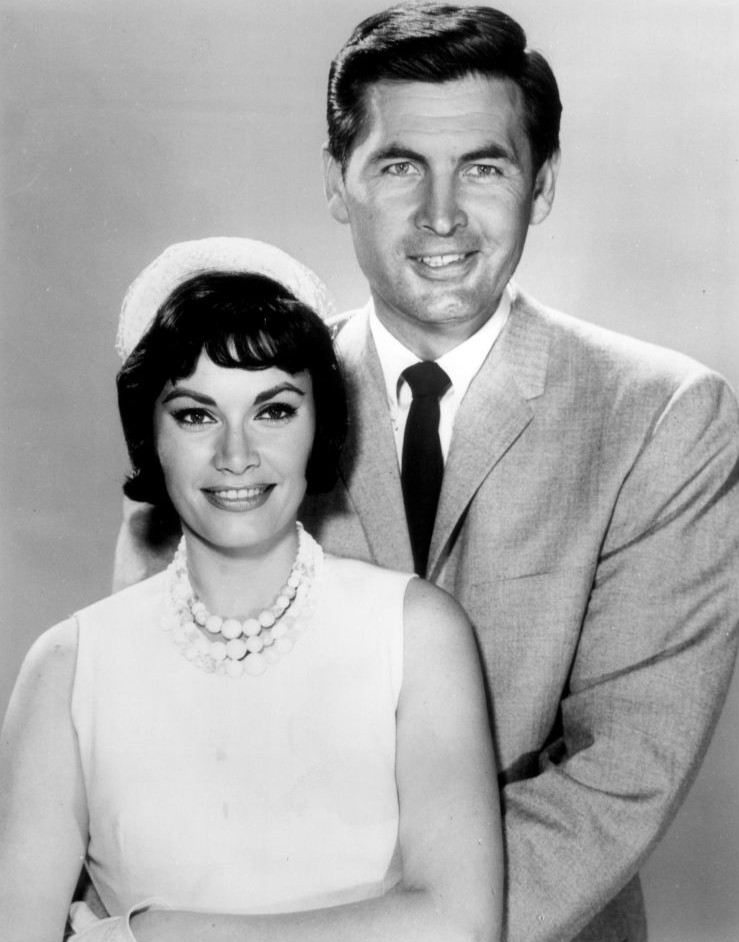
With Sandra Warner in Mr. Smith Goes to Washington

James Arness was first considered for the role of Davy Crockett while Walt Disney Productions begun work on the series. Parker had recently graduated to being a contract weekly actor but listened to his agent and appeared in a Warner Bros. science fiction film about giant ants called Them!, which required only one day's work. During the screening of this film, Walt Disney looked past Arness and discovered Parker. Disney was impressed by Parker's portrayal of a man who was unswerving in his belief in what he saw despite the forces of authority against him. They asked him to drop by the Disney Studio. When he did, he brought his guitar, met Disney, sang a song, and then said goodbye. Several weeks later, Disney informed him that he had been selected over Arness and several others for the role.

Disney's three-episode version of Crockett depicted his exploits as a frontiersman, congressman, and tragic hero of the Alamo. The episodes have been called the first television miniseries, though the term had not yet been coined. Davy Crockett (1954–55) was a tremendous hit and led to a merchandising frenzy for coonskin caps and more.

Parker became a contract star for Disney and appeared in The Great Locomotive Chase, Westward Ho, the Wagons!, Old Yeller, and The Light in the Forest. He complained that they were all basically the same role. Disney refused to lend Parker for roles outside that persona, such as Jeffrey Hunter's role opposite John Wayne in The Searchers and Marilyn Monroe's leading man in Bus Stop.

Parker was dissatisfied with Disney's proposal to use him only in a small role in Tonka. He was put on suspension for refusing the role, and subsequently left Disney.

=== Post Disney ===
Parker made guest appearances on many television programs, and composed and sang. He performed the occasional role of Tom Conrad, editor of the Diablo Courier in the syndicated western series, Annie Oakley (1954–1957), starring Gail Davis, Brad Johnson, and Jimmy Hawkins.

Parker was contracted to Paramount Pictures from 1958 to 1962. He appeared in a small assortment of Paramount movies, including a cameo as an unnamed frontiersman in Bob Hope's Western comedy Alias Jesse James and supporting roles in The Hangman (1959) with Robert Taylor, The Jayhawkers! (1959) with Jeff Chandler, and Hell Is for Heroes (1962) with Steve McQueen.

In 1962, he starred in the title role of the TV series Mr Smith Goes to Washington, portraying the same idealistic character that James Stewart had played in the 1939 film. Parker took to the stage in 1963, in a traveling production of Oklahoma! as Curly. The movie roles he sought were elusive. In 1966, Parker starred in the movie Smoky, directed by George Sherman, where he played the role of Clint Barkley, who befriends and grooms a wild black stallion named Smoky.

=== Daniel Boone ===
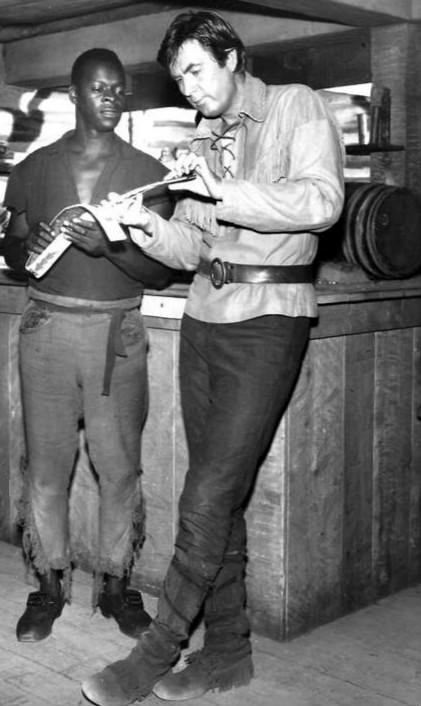
Fess Parker as Daniel Boone with Brock Peters

Parker's Daniel Boone television series portraying another historic figure of America's frontier days began filming in 1964. Over its six years (1964 to 1970) as one of the highest-rated shows of its time, Parker was not only the star of the series, but also the co-producer and director of five of its most popular episodes.

Turning down the title role of McCloud, Parker retired from acting at the age of 49 after a sitcom pilot called The Fess Parker Show was broadcast on March 28, 1974, but was not subsequently picked up by the network.

== Awards ==
Fess Parker was nominated for best new personality Emmy in 1954, but lost to George Gobel. He was never nominated again, nor was his show Daniel Boone.

In 1991, he was named a Disney Legend.

In 2003, Parker received the Texas Cultural Trust's "Texas Medal of Arts Award", established only the year before.

For his work with Disney, Parker was honored in December 2004 with his own tribute window on a façade in the Frontierland section of Disneyland.

== Business and politics ==
Parker became interested in opening a Davy Crockett-themed amusement park. In the late 1960s, he optioned land in northern Kentucky at the intersection of Interstates 71 and 75, with the intention of building Frontier Worlds. However, when the Taft Broadcasting Company of Cincinnati, Ohio, began building Kings Island in nearby Mason, Ohio, less than a 2-hour drive from Parker's site, financing for Parker's venture dried up. Plans for the Frontier World park were eventually revitalized in Santa Clara, California and developed into California's Great America.

=== Fess Parker Winery ===
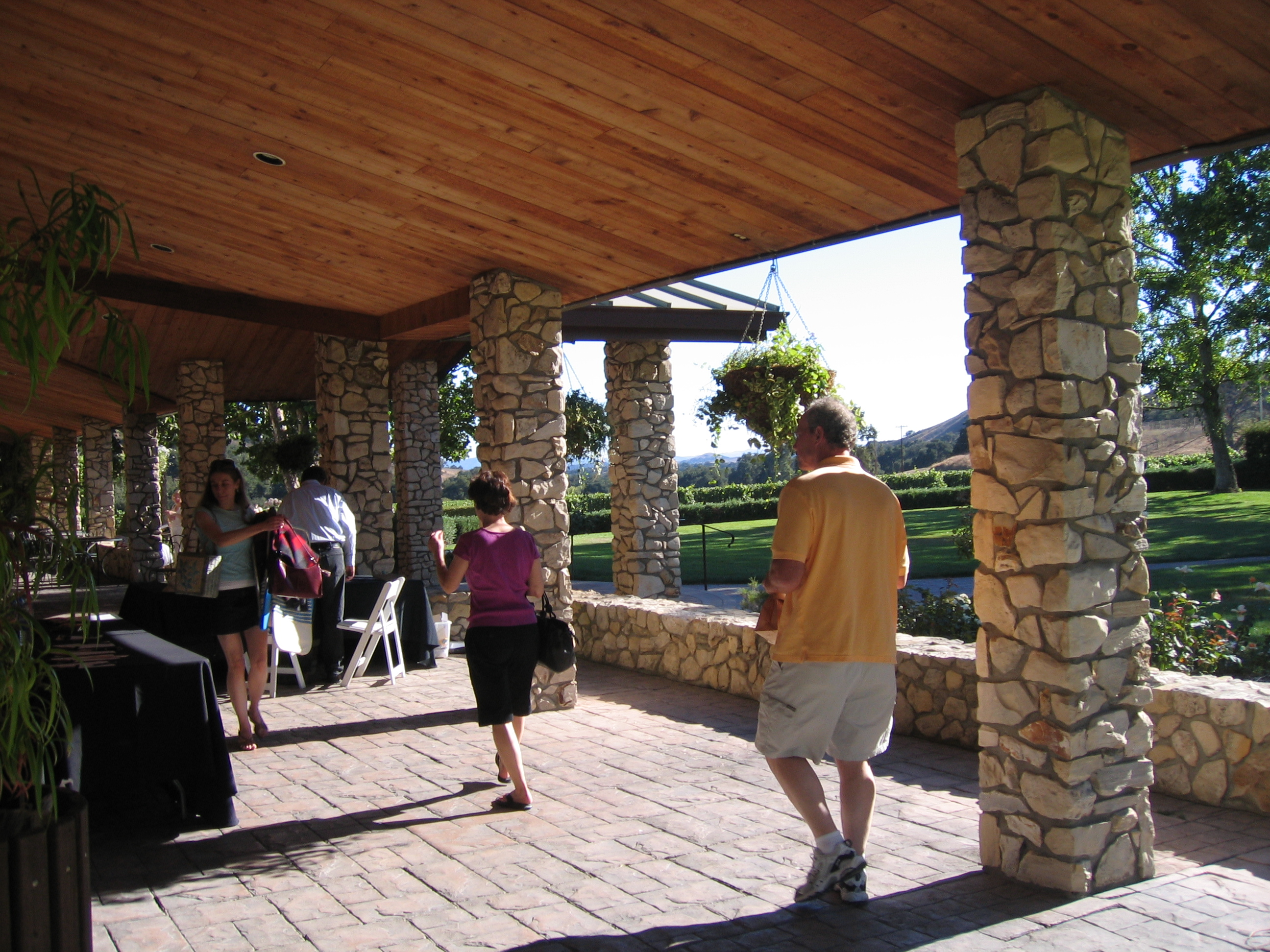
The Fess Parker Winery in Los Olivos, California

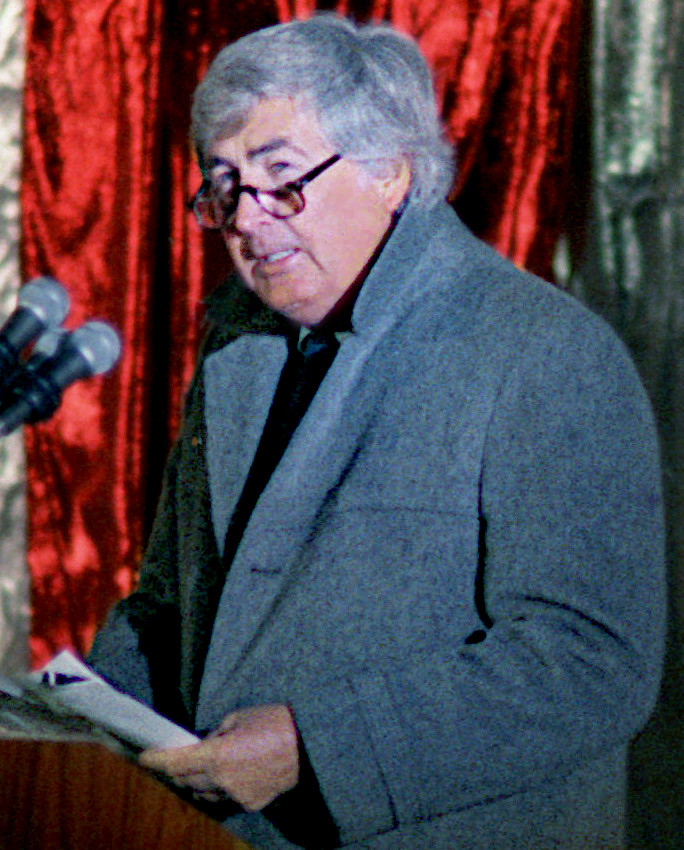
Fess Parker in 1985

After his acting career, Parker devoted much of his time to operating his Fess Parker Family Winery and Vineyards in Los Olivos, California. The winery is owned and operated by Parker's family, and has produced several different types of award-winning wines. Parker's son, Eli, is president and director of winemaking and vineyard operations, while daughter, Ashley, is vice president of marketing and sales.

The Parker operation includes over 1,500 acres (610 ha) of vineyards, and a tasting room and visitor center along the Foxen Canyon Wine Trail. In addition to wine, the winery is known for selling coonskin caps and bottle toppers inspired by Parker's Crockett and Boone characters, and for its appearance under another name in the movie Sideways. In reminiscence of his acting days, Parker's wine labels have a logo of a golden coonskin cap.

The Parker Family also operates a 19-room hotel in Los Olivos, California at 2860 Grande Ave by the name of Fess Parker Wine Country Inn, which also houses a restaurant.

=== Politics ===
In 1985, Parker briefly flirted with running in 1986 for the United States Senate as a Republican for the seat of incumbent Democrat Alan Cranston. He considered himself a conservative in the mould of Ronald Reagan.

== Personal life and death ==
Parker married Marcella Belle Rinehart on January 18, 1960. They had two children, Fess Elisha Parker III and Ashley Allen Rinehart, along with 11 grandchildren and a great-grandson.

Parker died of natural causes on March 18, 2010, at his home in Santa Ynez, California, near the Fess Parker Winery. He is buried in the Santa Barbara Cemetery with a simple headstone, and a coonskin hat inscribed below his name.

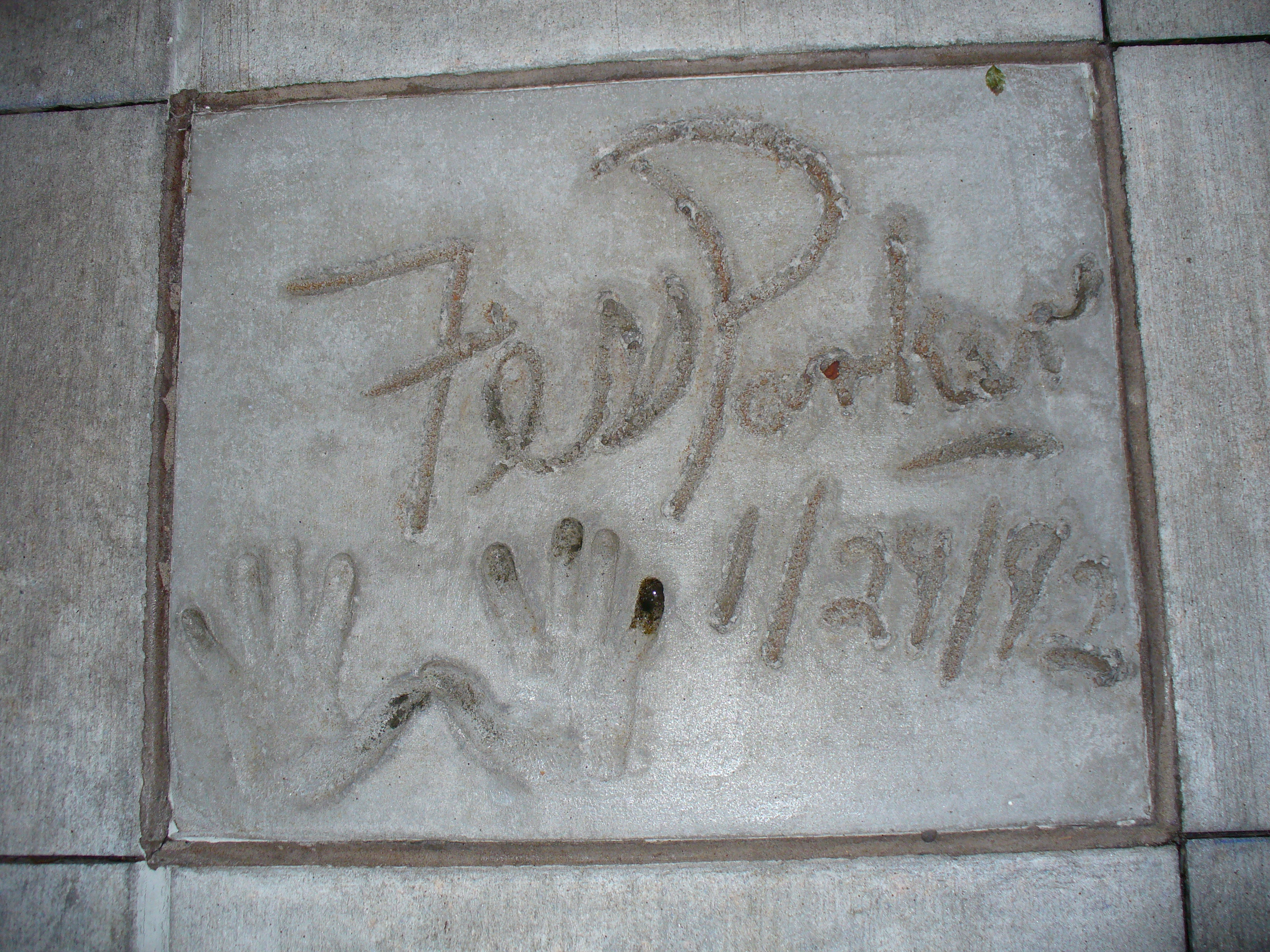
The handprints of Fess Parker in front of Hollywood Hills Amphitheater at Walt Disney World's Disney's Hollywood Studios theme park

== Filmography ==
=== Film ===
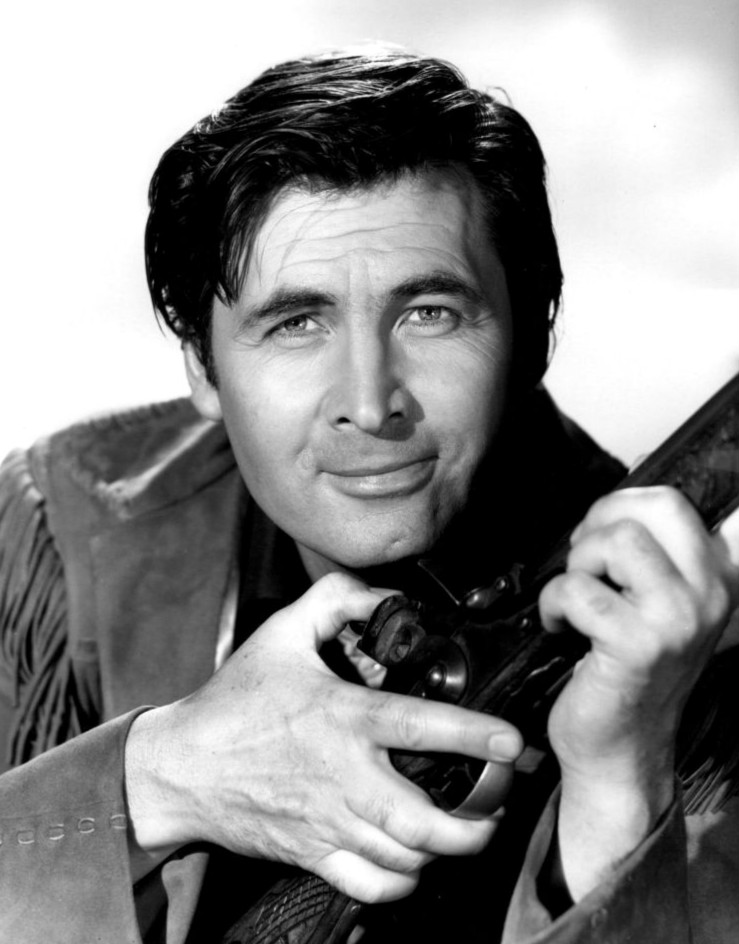
Parker as Daniel Boone

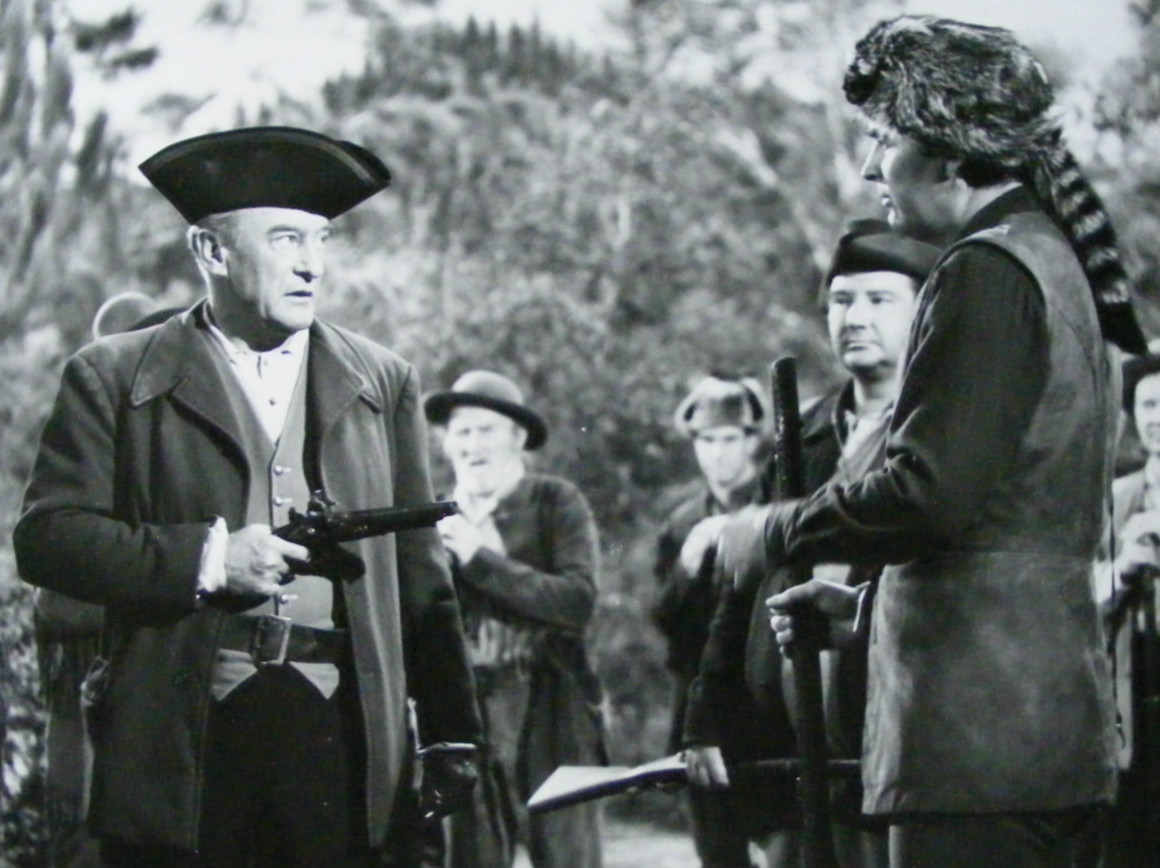
George Sanders with Parker as Boone (1966)

Year	Title	Role	Notes
1943	We've Never Been Licked	Uncredited 1st screen appearance, is an extra in crowd scenes	
1950	Harvey	Leslie	Voice, Uncredited
1952	No Room for the Groom	Cousin Ben	Uncredited
1952	Untamed Frontier	Clem McCloud	
1952	Springfield Rifle	Jim Randolph	Uncredited
1953	Man on a Tightrope	Checkpoint Soldier	Uncredited
1953	Take Me to Town	Long John	Uncredited
1953	The Kid from Left Field	McDougal	
1953	Island in the Sky	Fitch's Co-Pilot	Uncredited
1953	Thunder Over the Plains	Kirby	
1954	Dragonfly Squadron	Texas Lieutenant	Uncredited
1954	Them!	Alan Crotty	
1954	The Bounty Hunter	Wild Cowboy at Finale	Uncredited
1955	Battle Cry	Private Speedy	
1955	Davy Crockett, King of the Wild Frontier	Davy Crockett	
1956	The Great Locomotive Chase	James J. Andrews	
1956	Davy Crockett and the River Pirates	Davy Crockett	
1956	Westward Ho, The Wagons!	John 'Doc' Grayson	
1957	Old Yeller	Jim Coates	
1958	The Light in the Forest	Del Hardy	
1959	The Hangman	Sheriff Buck Weston	
1959	Alias Jesse James	Davy Crockett	Uncredited
1959	The Jayhawkers!	Cam Bleeker	
1962	Hell Is for Heroes	Sergeant Pike	
1966	Smoky	Clint Barkley	
1966	Daniel Boone: Frontier Trail Rider	Daniel Boone	
1972	Climb an Angry Mountain	Sheriff Elisha Cooper	TV movie

=== Television ===
- Dragnet: The Big Winchester (March 5, 1954 - Season 3, Episode 27)
- "Annie Oakley: (May 8th, 1954), Annie and the Texas Sandman"
- Death Valley Days: (1954) Season 2, Ep 15, Kickapoo Run
- Davy Crockett (miniseries 1954–1955)
- City Detective (1 episode, 1955)
- Mr. Smith Goes to Washington (1962–1963)
- The Alfred Hitchcock Hour (1963) (Season 2 Episode 6: "Nothing Ever Happens in Linvale") as Sheriff Ben Wister
- Daniel Boone (lead cast member from 1964 to 1970, with Ed Ames, Patricia Blair, Darby Hinton, and Veronica Cartwright)
- Climb an Angry Mountain (1972)
- The Fess Parker Show (1974) (unsold pilot)
- American Gunmaker: The John M. Browning Story. 1991, host and narrator.https://m.imdb.com/title/tt28674607/
- Oz and James's Big Wine Adventure (2007) (as himself, discussing wine making)

== See also ==
- List of celebrities who own wineries and vineyards
