= Chaino =

American drummer

Chaino (Musician)
- Chaino, Jungle Mating Rhythms (1958)

Background information
- Born: Leon Johnson; 1927; Philadelphia, Pennsylvania
- Died: July 8, 1999 (aged 71–72) Chicago, Illinois
- Genres: Exotica
- Occupations: Musician, Painter, jeweler and sculpture
- Instrument: Bongos
- Years active: 1947-1999
- Labels: Spectre, Verve Records, Tampa Records, SLP 4027, Dot Records, Bacchus Archives, Empire Recording Co, Alphatape

Leon "Chaino" Johnson (1927 – July 8, 1999, pronounced: "Cha-ee-no"), the self-styled "percussion genius of Africa," was an American bongo player. After touring for several years on the Chitlin' Circuit, he released several albums and became popular with listeners of exotica music in the late 1950s and early 1960s. In the promotion of his albums, a fictional biography was developed, depicting Chaino as an orphan from a lost tribe in central Africa who had been rescued by a missionary after his tribe had been massacred. Chaino was actually born in Philadelphia and raised in Chicago.

== Early years ==
Chaino was born in Philadelphia, but he grew up on the South Side of Chicago. After attending grammar school, Chaino left home to see the country. He began playing the bongos and toured "the so-called 'Chitlin' Circuit of black nightclubs." According to his brother, George Johnson, Chaino lost touch with his family and "vacillated between the brink of stardom and edge of starvation as he made a name for himself in the late 1940s and '50s as a percussionist."

== Exotica albums ==
In 1958, Chaino teamed up with record producer Kirby Allan; the pair released several albums in the late 1950s. The first album released by the Chaino-Allan team was Jungle Mating Rhythms, released by Verve Records in 1958. Chaino and Allan released five additional albums: Percussion for Playboys, Jungle Echoes, Night of the Spectre, Africana, and Temptation. The albums featured Chaino playing bongos, steel drums and other percussion instruments, combined with primal chants and "strains of grunting and howling" that Allan called "sensual primitive music" or "Americanized African" music. In June 1958, Billboard gave Night of the Spectre a four-star review and noted:

"A truly unusual sound can be heard on this album. Chaino turns in what amounts to a one-man show on a variety of bongos, congo drums, steel drums, gourds and assorted noisemakers, altho [sic] the label's sound work doesn't do it real justice. Rhythms are basically African or Afro-Cuban. In the background, Chaino whistles, wails and occasionally gives a blood-curdling whoop."

Chaino on Los Angeles' Bongo Beach, 1959

Seeking to capitalize on the popularity of the exotica genre, the liner notes for Chaino's albums built a mythology of Chaino as an orphan who was "the only survivor of a lost race of people from the wilds of the jungle in a remote part of central Africa where few white men have ever been." According to the liner notes, he learned to "play seven or more drums at the same time, with such a blur of speed that you can hardly see his hands." The fictional biography developed for Chaino included a story of being brought to the United States by a missionary and his wife after his tribe was massacred by hostile neighbors. One music historian later wrote that the story contained familiar stereotypes that "seemed to parallel the screenplay for a Tarzan film."

Allan later recalled his experiences with Chaino: "He was a troubled artist, but it was what made him a great artist. He vented all his hang-ups and sexual frustrations busting out on those drums. I almost got shot trying to help him. People would come after him for all kinds of reason." In addition to his solo albums, Chaino also worked as a session musician and appeared in two feature films, Night Tide (1961) and The Devil's Hand (1962), and a television movie, The Phantom (1961). In 1962, he toured on the same bill with Miriam Makeba. He was scheduled to perform with Makeba at the Hollywood Bowl, but was unable to appear because he was in jail at the time.

Chaino's music enjoyed renewed popularity in the late 1990s as part of the revival of interest in the exotica and ultra lounge genres. In his book, Mondo Exotica, Francesco Adinolfi wrote that, in Chaino's albums, "exotica found its fullest expression: repeated, driving rhythms, savage cries, and tribal iconography intended to trigger the pagan fantasies of the listener." In Pad: The Guide to Ultra-Living, Matt Maranian wrote: "This is music to mate by; a cut above your average exotica." Another reviewer in 1999 wrote that Chaino's work consisted of "trippy tunes" that "could be heard in settings like tiki parties and porno theaters."

== Later years ==
Chaino later lived in Oklahoma City where he played in local clubs. Carl Brandon, a philanthropist and active in the Oklahoma City culture, found a homeless Chaino In 1989. Carl Brandon assisted Chaino by renting a small house and encouraging him to apply for government benefits to stabilize his gypsy lifestyle. Chaino quickly established himself into local music scene. He remains loved admired and missed.. Chaino returned to Chicago for a reunion with his brother. He was badly injured in a bar fight in Los Angeles in 1998 and again returned to Chicago where he stayed with his brother. He developed a brain tumor and, in July 1999, he suffered a heart attack following surgery to remove the tumor and died in Chicago. A retrospective compact disc titled, Chaino, Africana and Beyond was released shortly after his death.

== Discography ==
- Jungle Mating Rhythms (1958), Verve MGV-2104
- Jungle Rhythms (1958), Score SLP-4027
- Jungle Echoes (1958), Omega Records OSL-7
- Night of the Spectre (1958), Tampa Records TP-4
- Chaino Africana (1959), Dot DLP-25240
- Temptation: The Exotic Sounds of Chaino (1961), Empire Recording Co. V-17

plus...

- The Kirby Allan Group, Percussion for Primitive Lovers (1958), Maze MAZ-B-331
- The Kirby Allan Group, Percussion For Playboys, Volume 1 (1958), Maze MAZ-B-385
- The Kirby Allan Group, Percussion For Playboys, Volume 2 (1958), Maze MAZ-B-387
