= Mr. Smith Goes to Washington (TV series) =

American situation comedy TV series (1962–1963)

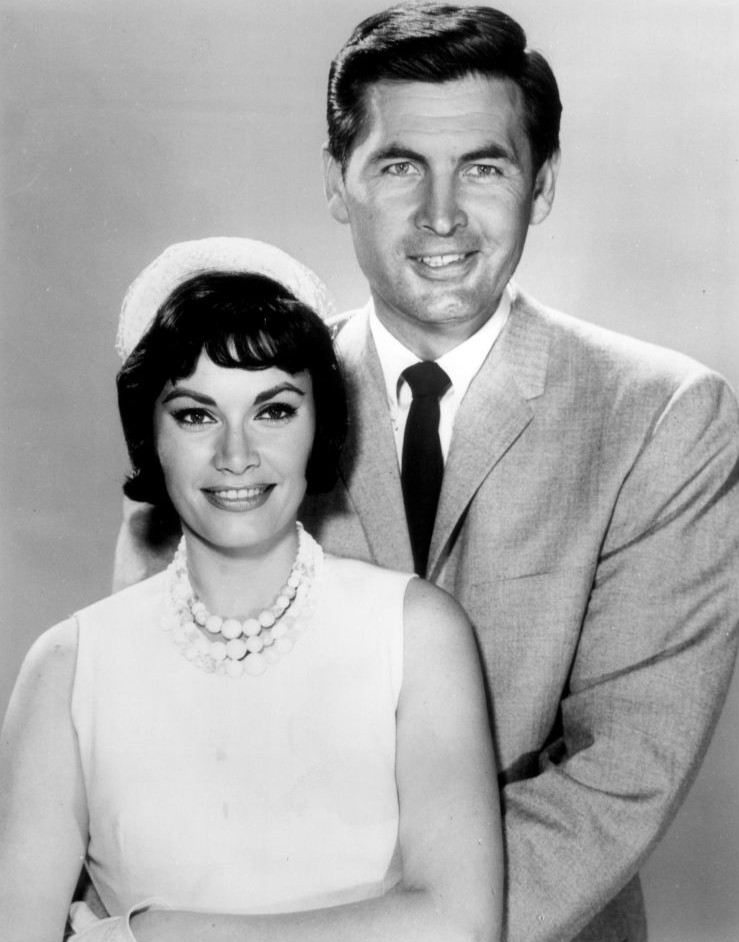
- Sandra Warner and Fess Parker as Pat and Eugene Smith.
- Genre: Sitcom
- Created by: Hal Stanley, based on the 1939 theatrical movie
- Starring: Fess Parker; Sandra Warner; Red Foley
- Theme music composer: Irving Taylor; Hal Stanley
- Opening theme: "Mr. Smith Goes To Washington"
- Composers: Jimmie Haskell; Paul Smith; Vic Mizzy
- Country of origin: United States
- Original language: English
- No. of seasons: 1
- No. of episodes: 25

Production
- Producer: Hal Stanley
- Camera setup: Multi-camera
- Running time: 24 mins.
- Production company: Starstan-Fespar Productions (in association with Screen Gems)

Original release
- Network: ABC
- Release: September 29, 1962 – March 23, 1963

Related
- Mr. Smith Goes to Washington

Mr. Smith Goes to Washington is an American sitcom that aired on ABC starring Fess Parker. The series, which aired from September 29, 1962 to March 30, 1963, was based on the 1939 film of the same name, starring James Stewart in the title role.

== Premise ==
The title character is a "small-town idealist who becomes a United States senator" who was elected to fill the unexpired term of the incumbent who died. Although Smith seemed naive, he disappointed his backers. Smith's small-town background led him to use a "low-keyed, homespun approach" to problems within his family and at the national level.

Regular characters in the series, in addition to Smith, were his wife Pat, his Uncle Cooter, Miss Kelly (a secretary), and Arnie (a chauffeur).

== Cast ==
- Eugene Smith - Fess Parker
- Pat Smith - Sandra Warner
- Uncle Cooter - Red Foley
- Miss Kelly - Rita Lynn
- Arnie - Stan Irwin

== Guest stars ==
- Harpo Marx
- Buster Keaton
- Charles Lane
- Jim Nabors
- Hope Summers
- Kay Starr (at the time, producer Hal Stanley's wife)
- Edward Everett Horton
- Leo Gorcey
- Jack Carter
- Cecil Kellaway

== Episode list ==
No.	Title	Directed by	Written by	Original release date
1	"Washington Hostess"	Unknown	Unknown	September 29, 1962
2	"Bad Day at Cuttin' Corners"	Unknown	Unknown	October 6, 1962
3	"...But What Are You Doing for Your Country?"	Oscar Rudolph	Earl Hamner Jr.	October 13, 1962
4	"The Musicale"	Oscar Rudolph	Earl Hamner Jr.	October 20, 1962
5	"The Country Sculptor"	Unknown	Unknown	October 27, 1962
6	"The Senator and the Paperboy"	Unknown	Unknown	November 3, 1962
7	"The Fork in the Road"	Unknown	Unknown	November 10, 1962
8	"First Class Citizen"	Unknown	Unknown	November 17, 1962
9	"The Senator Baits a Hook"	Unknown	Unknown	November 24, 1962
10	"For Richer or Poorer"	Unknown	Unknown	December 1, 1962
11	"Man's Best Friend"	Unknown	Unknown	December 8, 1962
12	"The Sleeping Sentry"	Unknown	Unknown	December 22, 1962
13	"Without a Song"	Unknown	Unknown	December 29, 1962
14	"That's Show Business"	Unknown	Unknown	January 5, 1963
15	"Miss Ida's Star"	Unknown	Unknown	January 12, 1963
16	"Think Mink"	Claudio Guzmán	Howard Snyder & Jack Harvey	January 19, 1963
17	"The Resurrection of Winesap Corners"	Unknown	Unknown	January 26, 1963
18	"Oh, Pioneers!"	Unknown	Unknown	February 2, 1963
19	"Grand Ol' Opry"	Unknown	Unknown	February 9, 1963
20	"And Still the Champ"	Unknown	Unknown	February 16, 1963
21	"Citizen Bellows"	Unknown	Unknown	February 23, 1963
22	"Kid from Brooklyn"	Unknown	Unknown	March 2, 1963
23	"To Be or Not to Be"	Unknown	Unknown	March 9, 1963
24	"High Society"	Unknown	Unknown	March 16, 1963
25	"The Lobbyist"	Unknown	Unknown	March 23, 1963

== Production ==
Hal Stanley was the producer and creator of the series, which was filmed in black-and-white with a laugh track. Claudio Guzman and Oscar Rudolph were two of the directors. Earl Hamner, Jack Harvey, and Howard Snyder were three of the writers. Stanley and Irving Taylor wrote the theme song. The show was broadcast from 8:30 to 9 p.m. Eastern Time on Saturdays. Sponsors included Camel cigarettes, Metrecal, and U. S. Royal Tires.

== Critical response ==
John P. Shanley, writing in The New York Times, commented that much of the initial episode was "obvious and unnecessary."
