= Exotica (Martin Denny album) =

Album by Martin Denny

Studio album by Martin Denny
- Released: May 1957
- Recorded: December 1956
- Genre: Exotica
- Length: 30:36
- Label: Liberty
- Producer: Martin Denny (uncredited); Simon Jackson

Martin Denny chronology
Exotica (1957)	Exotica Volume II (1958)

Singles from Exotica
- 1. "Quiet Village" Released: October 15, 1958

Professional ratings
Review scores
Source	Rating
AllMusic	3/5 stars

Exotica is the debut album by Martin Denny, released in 1957. It contained Les Baxter's most famous piece, "Quiet Village", and spawned an entire genre bearing its name. It was recorded December 1956 in Webley Edwards' studio in Waikiki (not, as often reported, the Aluminum Dome at Henry J. Kaiser's Hawaiian Village Complex). The album topped Billboard's charts in 1959.

The album was recorded in mono. It was re-recorded in stereo in 1958; by then, however, Denny's sideman Arthur Lyman had left the group, and was replaced by Julius Wechter. Denny preferred the original mono version: "It has the original spark, the excitement, the feeling we were breaking new ground."

Denny acknowledged Baxter's contributions to his success. "Long before my [“Quiet Village”] record came out, [Baxter had] released an album with that tune on it, a suite called Le Sacre du Sauvage. I took at least five or six selections from it; they’re imaginative and they fit in with what I did. But he [Baxter] had a big orchestra at his command, whereas I only had five guys, so I had to give “Quiet Village” a different interpretation entirely. As a result, my version turned out to be the big record. Lex Baxter gets composer’s rights, so he’s made a fortune off my recordings."

In 2025, Uncut ranked Exotica at number 408 in their list of "The 500 Greatest Albums of the 1950s", with contributor Jason Anderson writing that "Denny's landmark release remains a shimmering jewel of ersatz "world" music."

== Track listing ==
1. "Quiet Village" (Les Baxter) – 3:39
2. "Return to Paradise" (Dimitri Tiomkin, Ned Washington) – 2:19
3. "Hong Kong Blues" (Hoagy Carmichael) – 2:15
4. "Busy Port" (Baxter) – 2:50
5. "Lotus Land" (Cyril Scott) – 2:22
6. "Similau" (Arden Clar, Harry Coleman) – 1:57
7. "Stone God" (Baxter) – 3:07
8. "Jungle Flower" (Baxter) – 1:46
9. "China Nights" (Shina No Yoru) (Nobuyuki Takeoka) – 2:01
10. "Ah Me Furi" (Gil Baumgart) – 2:08
11. "Waipio" (Francis Brown) – 3:11
12. "Love Dance" (Baxter) – 2:29

== Personnel ==
- Martin Denny – piano, arrangements
- Arthur Lyman – vibes, xylophone, percussion
- John Kramer – string bass
- Augie Colon – bongos, congas, Latin effects, bird calls
- Harold Chang – drums, percussion
- Bob Lang – engineer
- Sandy Warner – cover model
