= Teenage Devil Dolls =

- Directed by: Bamlet L. Price, Jr.
- Written by: Bamlet L. Price, Jr.
- Produced by: Bamlet L. Price, Jr.
- Starring: Barbara Marks; Robert A. Sherry
- Narrated by: Kurt Martell
- Cinematography: William R. Lieb; S. David Saxon
- Edited by: Bamlet L. Price, Jr.
- Music by: Robert Drasnin
- Release date: 1955
- Running time: 70 minutes
- Country: United States
- Language: English

Teenage Devil Dolls (released in theaters as One Way Ticket to Hell) is a 1955 American black and white teen crime drama film produced, written and directed by Bamlet L. Price, Jr. The film was made in a quasi-documentary style that has no dialogue, just sound effects and music by Robert Drasnin. The movie is narrated by Kurt Martell, as Police Lieutenant David Jason, but the part of the Lieutenant is portrayed by actor Robert A. Sherry in the film. Price borrowed $4000 from his then-wife Anne Francis to make the film.

== Cast ==
- Barbara Marks as Cassandra Leigh
- Kurt Martell as the Narrator, Lt. David Jason
- Robert A. Sherry as Lieutenant David Jason
- Bamlet Lawrence Price, Jr. as Miguel 'Cholo' Martinez
- Lucille Price as Cassandra's Mother
- Bamlet Lawrence Price, Sr. as Cassandra's Current Stepfather
- William Kendell as Russell Packard
- Robert Norman as Johnny Adams
- Elaine Lindenbaum as Margo Rossi
- Joel Climenhaga as Sven Bergman
- Joe Popavich as Al Stutzman
- Anthony Gorsline as Jimmy Sanchez
- Victor Schwartz as Sergeant Schwartz

== Reviews ==
The New York Times (December 8, 1955) was highly critical in its review of the film, writing: "The sensationalism implicit in the title of One-Way Ticket to Hell is hardly evident in this depiction of drug addiction and narcotics traffic...a case history of a young girl's descent into enslavement to the habit, this obviously serious attempt to illustrate and warn against the disastrous effects of the evil emerges largely as an unimaginative cops-and-robbers-type melodrama. Although its intentions are undoubtedly noble this latter-day parable is crude and without force...there is no dialogue, the story is related in "voice-of-doom" fashion by...the off-screen narrator - it affords its cast little opportunity to develop character. Bamlet L. Price Jr...plays Cholo Martinez, one of the villains who leads the heroine astray, may be listed as an ambitious and busy man. Nothing more. Barbara Marks only occasionally rises to the emotional levels called for in the role of the disturbed lass who drifts from a broken home to an eventually broken marriage, to marijuana, sleeping pills and heroin. The other members of the cast are not effective. Neither is One-Way Ticket to Hell."

Steven Pulchaski's review in his book, Slimetime: A Guide to Sleazy, Mindless Movies, was devastating, writing - "this is an obscure, anti-drug, anti-juvenile delinquent anti-rebellion morality story, all told in not-so-glorious Dragnet style narration...it's overwrought, paranoid, fearmongering, and totally idiotic...basically, this is drug-paranoia propaganda at its bleakest and least entertaining, with grainy black and white photography, static direction...it just drones on for sixty-or-so minutes, and though the plot tries to be controversial and hard-hitting, the flick is actually so unsleazy that it never gets off the ground".

Leonard Maltin rated the movie D saying it was "Yet another entry in the Reefer Madness school of filmmaking, about an insecure, discontented teen girl's descent into drug addiction and crime. Presented as a case history and without dialogue; there's only narration and sound effects."

== End credits ==
The film ends with a cautionary message:

Today, there are more than 60,000 drug addicts in the United States, supporting an illicit drug traffic amounting to $220,000,000 annually. Ten years ago addicts under the age of 21 were almost unknown. Today, they are being committed to hospitals and correctinal institutions in alarming numbers. The records of our two federal narcotic hospitals show an increase of 2,000% during a recent four year period. (1) The great tragedy of the situation lies within the problem of rehabilitation. It is estimated that only 5 to 10 percent of those given medical treatment for narcotic addiction will receive permanent benefit. (1) The percentage of permanently cured heroin addicts is even smaller...less than 2 percent.

— (1) The Preliminary Report of the Subcommittee on Narcotics, Assembly California State Legislature. (1952)
