= Daichi Itō =

Japanese drummer, singer and whistler

Daichi Itō is a Japanese drummer, singer, and whistler who was one of the founders of the band SAKEROCK.

== Early life ==
Daichi Itō was born on March 8, 1980 in Nishitokyo City, Japan (then known as Hoya City). He grew up in Jakarta, Indonesia and started playing drums in high school back in Japan.

== Career ==
In 2000, he was one of the founders of the band SAKEROCK. The band performed together until 2015. During SAKEROCK, he also performed with other bands, including Killing Floor, Cherry's and Good Dogs Happy Men, and Good Luck Heiwa. Along with drumming, he does background vocals and whistling for groups. He's a skilled whistler, being nicknamed Dr. Whistle.
