= The Tikiyaki Orchestra =

American modern exotica band

- Origin: Los Angeles, California
- Years active: 2007–present
- Members: Jim Bacchi - guitar, keyboards, percussion Jonpaul Balak - bass Nelson Bragg - percussion Pablo Baza - drums Gary Brandin - steel guitar Ian Harland - vibraphone
- Past members: Brian Kassan - guitar, keyboards Marty Lush, vibraphone
- Website: https://www.tikiyakiorchestra.com/

The Tikiyaki Orchestra is a seven piece modern exotica band that combines traditional exotica with the Music Of Hawaii, surf music, crime jazz, lounge music and space age pop in the Tiki sub-culture.

== History ==
Since 2008 they have performed at major Tiki festivals including Tiki Oasis and The Hukilau. Their music is on the soundtrack of Disneyland's Trader Sam's Enchanted Tiki Bar.

They utilize an orchestration of electric guitar, steel guitar, vibraphone, bass, 2 keyboards, percussion, and drum kit, with founder, multi-instrumentalist and composer Jim Bacchi as the leader.

The band has appeared at famous Tiki temples including The Mai-Kai in Ft. Lauderdale, FL, Bahooka in Rosemead, CA, Don The Beachcomber in Sunset Beach, CA, Trader Vic's in Emeryville, CA, Trader Vic's in Palo Alto, CA, The Caliente Tropics Resort in Palm Springs, CA, Humphrey's Half Moon Inn, The Hanalei Hotel and the Bali Hai in San Diego, CA.

Their music has appeared in numerous television, films and ads, notably the TV series Bones, Gaslit, NCIS: Los Angeles, the PBS documentary Plastic Paradise, The DVD Of Tiki Vol. 1: Paradise Lost, Joshua Tree, 1951: A Portrait of James Dean, Hotel Noir.

The band's merchandise has become sought by some collectors and includes several limited edition Tiki Mugs, Aloha Shirts, pendants, and bags.

== Discography ==
Sources:

- StereoExotique 2007
- Swingin' Sounds For The Jungle Jetset 2009
- Aloha, Baby! 2011
- Live At The Mayflower DVD 2011
- Idol Worship And Other Primitive Pleasures 2015
- Tropika 2023 (Art by Shag)
