= Kenta Hamano =

- 浜野 謙太
- Born: August 5, 1981 (age 45); Totsuka-ku, Yokohama, Kanagawa Prefecture, Japan
- Other name: Hamaken
- Occupations: Musician, composer, actor
- Years active: 2006–present
- Spouse: Agatha (m. 2012)
- Children: 2
- Musical career
- Instruments: Vocals; trombone
- Label: Kakubarhythm
- Member of: Zainichi Funk
- Formerly of: Sakerock

Kenta Hamano (浜野 謙太, Hamano Kenta; born August 5, 1981, in Totsuka-ku, Yokohama, Kanagawa Prefecture, Japan) is a Japanese musician, composer, and actor who is represented by the talent agency Kakubarhythm. He played the trombone in the band Sakerock.

== Filmography ==
=== TV dramas ===
| Year | Title | Role | Notes | Ref. |
|---|---|---|---|---|
| 2014 | Kamen Rider Drive | Kyu Saijo | | |
| 2015 | Napoleon no Mura | Kensuke Mabuchi | | |
| 2018 | Good Doctor | Taro Hashiguchi | | |
| 2018 | Segodon | Itō Hirobumi | Taiga drama | |
| 2019 | Idaten | Itō Hirobumi and Haruo Minami | Taiga drama | |
| 2019 | Motokare Mania | Akio Yamashita | | |
| 2019–21 | Radiation House | Gorō Nokishita | 2 seasons | |
| 2021 | Welcome Home, Monet | Shōyō Sasaki | Asadora | |
| 2023 | What Will You Do, Ieyasu? | Oda Nobukatsu | Taiga drama | |
| 2025 | Anpan | Hirame Hamabe (Anpanman) | Asadora | |
| 2026 | Shadows of the Ten Ninja | Anayama Kosuke | | |

=== Film ===
| Year | Title | Role | Notes | Ref. |
|---|---|---|---|---|
| 2020 | Looking for Magical Doremi | Seiya Kubo (voice) | | |
| 2021 | The Door into Summer | Gota Tsuboi | | |
| 2021 | Remain in Twilight | Sauce | | |
| 2021 | Every Trick in the Book | Ōkōchi | | |
| 2022 | Radiation House: The Movie | Gorō Nokishita | | |
| 2023 | Brats, Be Ambitious! | Sakurō | | |
| 2023 | Yoko | Wakamiya | | |
| 2023 | Analog | Yoshio Yamashita | | |
| 2024 | The Voices at War | Hajime Imafuku | | |
| 2025 | Stella Next to Me | Hiroshi Tanase | | |
| 2025 | Not Me That Went Viral | Shiomi | | |
| 2026 | Street Kingdom | | | |

=== Video games ===
| Year | Title | Role | Notes | Ref. |
|---|---|---|---|---|
| 2017 | Let It Die | Uncle Death | | |

=== Dubbing ===
- Soul, Joe Gardner
