= Quiet Village =

1951 song by Les Baxter

Song by Les Baxter

from the album Ritual of the Savage (Le Sacre du Sauvage)
- Released: 1951
- Recorded: May 17, 1951
- Genre: Exotica
- Length: 3:19
- Label: Capitol
- Composer: Les Baxter

"Quiet Village" is an orchestral pop instrumental that was written and originally performed by Les Baxter in 1951 and an instrumental album from 1959 by Martin Denny. In the liner notes to his album, Ritual of the Savage (Le sacre du sauvage), Baxter described the themes he was conveying in the work:

[t]he jungle grows more dense as the river boat slowly makes its way into the deep interior. A snake slithers into the water, flushing a brilliantly plumaged bird who soars into the clearing above a quiet village. Here is a musical portrait of a tropical village deserted in the mid-day heat.

== Martin Denny version ==
In the mid-1950s, Martin Denny and his band performed at a restaurant in Oahu, The Shell Bar, and frequently would play Baxter cover songs. One night, while his group was performing, Denny realized bullfrogs were croaking along to the music. As a joke, the band began incorporating frog sounds and birdcalls into the performance. Soon after, people began requesting "the song with the frogs." "They really enjoyed the frogs!" Denny observed. "And they thought we were making those croaking noises. So I understood that this was the way to go."

If you just hear [Quiet Village] on record, it sounds like a whole jungle—you don't know how or where any of those sounds originated. But if you hear it "live," then you can see how it's all done, with the percussion instruments. Quiet Village has a compulsive jungle rhythm to it; the bass has a hypnotic effect almost like Ravel's Boléro. On top of that are layers of exotic percussion, plus the sounds of the vibes, the piano, and (of course) the bird calls. It all adds up to a modern sound that evokes some very primitive feelings.

The squawks and jungle sounds in the Martin Denny version of "Quiet Village" were performed by A. Purves Pullen, also known as Dr. Horatio Q. Birdbath.

In 1957, Denny and his group released a cover of the song featuring exotic instruments and sounds that made it to number four on the pop singles chart on June 1, 1959 and number eleven on the R&B chart. Denny also recorded a stereo version of the song in 1959, a bossa nova version in 1964, and a version performed on a Moog synthesizer in 1969. He released an album with a similar title (Quiet Village, the Exotic Sounds of Martin Denny) in 1959.

"Quiet Village"

Single by Martin Denny

from the album Exotica
- B-side: "Llama Serenade"
- Released: 1958
- Recorded: 1956
- Studio: Hollywood, California
- Genre: Exotica
- Length: 2:42
- Label: Liberty
- Songwriter: Les Baxter

Martin Denny singles chronology
"Hong Kong Blues" (1957)	"Quiet Village" (1958)	"Martinique" (1959)

== Other cover versions ==
- In 1955, organist George Wright recorded an arrangement of the song on the former Chicago Paradise five-manual Wurlitzer theatre organ then installed in the home studio of Richard Vaughn. The arrangement made use of real bird calls - actually a recording of a mockingbird slowed down to half-speed which was also used in at least one recording by Arthur Lyman.
- In 1959, actress and singer Darla Hood recorded the first vocal version in the wake of the huge success that Martin Denny had with his instrumental version. Released on Ray Note Records and credited to Darla Hood & Fabulous Modesto Orch, which was percussionist Modesto Duran's Orchestra.
- In 1977, The Ritchie Family recorded a disco version and added vocals. The single was included on their African Queens album. Along with the album's title track and "Summer Dance", "Quiet Village" hit number one for three weeks on the disco/dance chart in 1977. However, unlike the Martin Denny version, The Ritchie Family recording did not chart on the pop singles chart. It did peak at #68 on the R&B singles chart.

"Quiet Village"

Single by The Ritchie Family

from the album African Queens
- B-side: "Voodoo"
- Released: 1977
- Genre: Disco
- Length: 3:08 (7" version); 5:45 (Album version)
- Label: Marlin
- Songwriter: Les Baxter
- Producer: Jacques Morali

The Ritchie Family singles chronology
"Life is Music" (1977)	"Quiet Village" (1977)	"American Generation" (1978)

- In 1986, composer Mark Mothersbaugh incorporated the song and animal sounds into the prelude theme for the children's television program Pee-wee's Playhouse.
