= Ritual of the Savage =

Studio album by Les Baxter
- Released: 1951
- Recorded: May 17, 1951
- Studio: Capitol (Hollywood)
- Genre: Exotica
- Length: 32:31
- Label: Capitol Records

Les Baxter chronology
Arthur Murray Favorites: Tangos (1951)	Ritual of the Savage (1951)	Festival of the Gnomes (1953)

Ritual of the Savage is an album by American composer Les Baxter, released in 1951 often cited as one of the most important exotica albums. The album featured lush orchestral arrangements along with tribal rhythms and offered such classics as "Quiet Village", "Jungle River Boat", "Love Dance", and "Stone God."

Baxter described the album as a "tone poem of the sound and the struggle of the jungle." The album's liner notes requested the listener to imagine himself transported to a tropical land. "Do the mysteries of native rituals intrigue you...does the haunting beat of savage drums fascinate you? Are you captivated by the forbidden ceremonies of primitive peoples in far-off Africa or deep in the interior of the Belgian Congo?"

== Track listing ==
Professional ratings
Review scores
Source	Rating
AllMusic	4.5/5 stars

1. "Busy Port" – 3:07
2. "Sophisticated Savage" – 2:15
3. "Jungle River Boat" – 3:08
4. "Jungle Flower" – 2:44
5. "Barquita" – 1:45
6. "Stone God" – 3:10
7. "Quiet Village" – 3:19
8. "Jungle Jalopy" – 2:37
9. "Coronation" – 3:00
10. "Love Dance" – 2:19
11. "Kinkajou" – 1:53
12. "The Ritual" – 3:14
