= Sandra Warner =

American model (1934–2022)

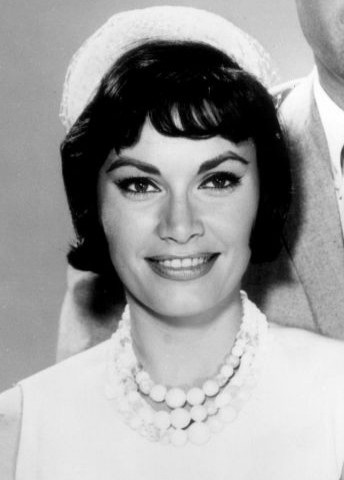
- Warner in Mr. Smith Goes to Washington (1962)

Sandra Faye Warner (May 12, 1934 – March 13, 2022), also known as Sandy Warner and later Sandra Warner Gendel, was an American actress, model, and singer, who sometimes performed with her twin sister Sonia Warner.

== Early years ==
Sandy and Sonia Warner began entertaining with a singing act when they were five years old.

== Modeling and music ==
Sandra Warner was the cover girl on Martin Denny's 1957 album Exotica, which reached no.1 in the Billboard charts, and on the album's first 11 sequels. Denny recalled, "She was a stunning model, extremely photogenic. She posed for at least the first dozen albums I did. They always changed her looks to fit the mood of the package." She also appeared as cover girl for other artists such as Mickey Katz's The Most Mishige.

In 1959 Warner released Steve Allen Presents Sandy Warner: Fair & Warner, one of a series of albums presented by Steve Allen, for which Martin Denny wrote the liner notes. The album was rereleased in 2014 by Edberg & Smith Records with the title Crazy Kisses.

== Television and film career ==
In Mr. Smith Goes to Washington, a 1962–63 ABC sitcom based on the 1939 film of the same name, Warner co-starred as the wife of U.S. Senator Eugene Smith (Fess Parker). Warner appeared in a number of films, often with her twin sister Sonia, including The Human Jungle, Some Like It Hot, Nicholas Ray's Party Girl, and John Boorman's Point Blank. Other television appearances included The Fugitive, two episodes of The Twilight Zone ("A Nice Place to Visit" and "The Dummy"), and one episode of Perry Mason ("The Case of the Bountiful Beauty" (1964)), playing the role of murder victim Stephanie Carew. She also made a brief appearance in the Have Gun, Will Travel episode "The Marshall's Boy" broadcast November 26, 1960.

In September 2009, Warner attended a celebration at the Hotel del Coronado of the 50th anniversary of the filming there of Some Like It Hot.

Warner died in Los Angeles on March 13, 2022, at the age of 87. She was predeceased by her sister, Sonia Warner.
