= Arthur Lyman =

Hawaiian jazz vibraphone and marimba player (1932–2002)

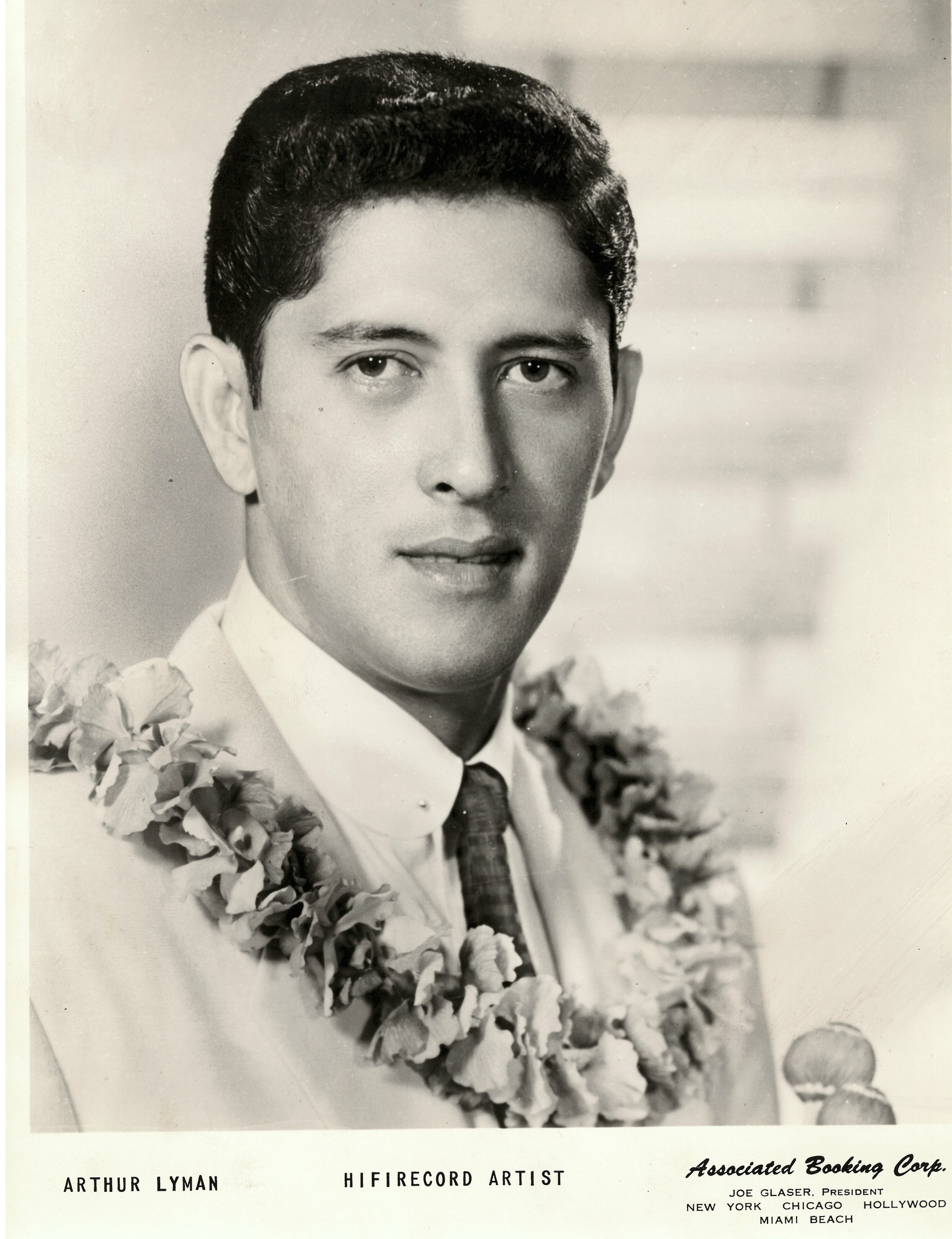

Background information
- Born: Arthur Hunt Lyman; February 2, 1932; Kauai, Territory of Hawaii, U.S.
- Died: February 24, 2002 (aged 70) Honolulu, Hawaii, U.S.
- Genres: jazz, Hawaiian, exotica
- Occupation: Musician
- Instruments: Marimba, xylophone, percussion
- Years active: 1948–2002
- Formerly of: Martin Denny band

Arthur Hunt Lyman (February 2, 1932 – February 24, 2002) was a Hawaiian jazz vibraphone and marimba player. His group popularized a style of faux-Polynesian music during the 1950s and 1960s which later became known as exotica. His albums became favorite stereo-effect demonstration discs during the early days of the stereophonic LP album for their elaborate and colorful percussion, deep bass and 2-dimensional recording soundstage. Lyman was known as "the King of Lounge music."

== Biography ==
Arthur Lyman was born on the island of Kauai in the U.S. territory of Hawaii, on February 2, 1932. He was the youngest of eight children of a Hawaiian mother and a father of Hawaiian, French, Belgian and Chinese descent. When Arthur's father, a riveter, lost his eyesight in an accident on Kauai, the family settled in Makiki, a subdistrict of Honolulu. Arthur's father was very strict with him, each day after school locking him in a room with orders to play along to a stack of Benny Goodman records "to learn what good music is." "I had a little toy marimba," Lyman later recalled, "a sort of bass xylophone, and from those old 78 rpm disks I learned every note Lionel Hampton recorded with the Goodman group." At age eight he made his public debut playing his toy marimba on the Listerine Amateur Hour on radio station KGMB, Honolulu, playing "Twelfth Street Rag." "I won a bottle of Listerine," he laughed. Lyman joined his father and brother playing USO shows on the bases at Kaneohe and Pearl Harbor. Over the next few years he became adept at the four-mallet style of playing which offers a greater range of chord-forming options. In fact he became good enough to turn professional at age 14 when he joined a group called the Gadabouts, playing vibes in the cool-jazz style then in vogue. "I was working at Leroy's, a little nightclub down by Kakaako. I was making about $60 a week, working Monday to Saturday, from 9 to 2 in the morning, and then I'd go to school. So it was kind of tough."

== Exotica ==
After graduating from McKinley High School in 1951, he put music on hold to work as a desk clerk at the Halekulani hotel. It was there in 1954 that he met pianist Martin Denny, who, after hearing him play, offered the 21-year-old a spot in his band. Initially wary, Lyman was persuaded by the numbers: he was making $280 a month as a clerk, and Denny promised more than $100 a week. Denny had been brought to Hawaii in January on contract by Don the Beachcomber, and stayed in Hawaii to play nightly in the Shell Bar at the Hawaiian Village. Other members of his band were Augie Colon on percussion and John Kramer on string bass. Denny, who had traveled widely, had collected numerous exotic instruments from all over the world and liked to use them to spice up his jazz arrangements of popular songs. The stage of the Shell Bar was very exotic, with a little tropical garden pool of water right outside the bandstand, and rocks & palm trees growing around. One full moon night Lyman had "had a little too many Mai-Tais to drink," and when they began playing the theme from Vera Cruz, Lyman let out a few bird calls. "The next thing you know, the audience started to answer me back with all kinds of weird cries. It was great." These bird calls became a trademark of Lyman's sound.

When Denny's Exotica album was released on record in 1957 it became a smash hit, igniting a national mania for all things South Pacific during the lead-up to Hawai'i becoming a state, including the South Pacific stage play, the film by that name, tiki-themed restaurants like Don the Beachcomber's and Trader Vic's, luaus, Oceanic art, exotic drinks, aloha shirts, and straw hats.

== Later career ==
That same year, Lyman was persuaded by Henry J. Kaiser to leave The Martin Denny Group to form his own group, continuing in much the same style but even more flamboyant. For decades Arthur and Martin did not speak to each other, but eventually came together (with many of their former bandmates) on Denny's 1990 CD Exotica '90 and remained friends since. Although the Polynesian craze faded as music trends changed, Lyman's combo continued to play to tourists nearly every Friday and Saturday night at the New Otani Kaimana Beach Hotel in Honolulu throughout the 1970s. Lyman continued to play as a solo act at the New Otani in the 1980s and 1990s. He also performed for years at Don the Beachcomber's Polynesian Village, the Shell Bar, the Waialae Country Club and the Canoe House at the Ilikai Hotel at Waikiki, the Bali Hai in San Diego and at the Edgewater Beach Hotel in Chicago. During the peak of his popularity Lyman recorded more than 30 albums and almost 400 singles, earning three gold albums. Taboo peaked at number 6 on Billboard's album chart and stayed on the chart for over a year, eventually selling more than two million copies. The title song peaked at number 55 on the Billboard Hot 100 in July 1959. Lyman's biggest pop single was "Yellow Bird," originally a Haitian song, which peaked at No. 4 in July 1961. His last charting single was "Love For Sale" (reaching number 43 in March 1963), but his music enjoyed a new burst of popularity in the 1990s with the lounge music revival and CD reissues.

== Death ==
Lyman died from esophageal cancer in February 2002.

== Arthur Lyman Group personnel ==
1957–1965	Arthur Lyman – vibraphone, marimba, xylophone, bird calls, congas, bongos, guitar, percussion (including wind chimes, ankle spurs, timbali, cocktail drums, boobams, jawbone, guiro, conch shell, tambourine, snare drums, wood block, finger cymbals, cowbells, castanets, samba percussion, Chinese gong and sleigh bells); Alan Soares – piano, celeste, glockenspiel, guitar, clavietta, marimba, percussion; John Kramer – string bass, bass guitar, percussion, ukulele, guitar, bird calls, flute, clarinet; Harold Chang – percussion, marimba, xylophone, bass
1965–1966	Arthur Lyman – vibraphone, marimba, xylophone, bird calls, congas, percussion; Alan Soares – piano, celeste, glockenspiel, guitar, percussion; Archie Grant – bass, flute, guitar, ukulele; Harold Chang – percussion, marimba, xylophone
1966–1975	Arthur Lyman – vibraphone, marimba, xylophone, percussion; Clem Low – piano; Archie Grant – bass; Harold Chang – percussion, marimba, xylophone; Kapiolani Lyman (his daughter) – percussion, marimba, flute, hula, vocals
1975–1978	Arthur Lyman – vibraphone, marimba, ukulele, percussion; Paul Reid – piano; Randy Aton – bass; Pat Sombrio – drums; Kapiolani Lyman – percussion, marimba, flute, hula, vocals; Neil Norman – guest guitarist

== Recording details ==
Most of Lyman's albums were recorded in the aluminum Kaiser geodesic dome auditorium on the grounds of the Kaiser Hawaiian Village Hotel on Waikiki in Honolulu. This space provided unique acoustics and a natural 3-second reverberation. His recordings also benefited from being recorded on a one-of-kind Ampex 3-track 1/2" tape recorder designed and built by engineer (and Hi-Fi Records label owner) Richard Vaughn. All of Lyman's albums were recorded live, without overdubbing. He recorded after midnight, to avoid the sounds of traffic and tourists, and occasionally you can hear the aluminum dome creaking as it settles in the cool night air. Lyman noted that he did not like recording in the dome because of the echo and the outside noise but did so because it was free. At night, after playing in the lounge the band would wheel their instruments over to the dome and record all night. They knew their recording session was over when morning came and the trash trucks started making noise. The quality of these recordings became even more evident with the advent of CD reissues, when the digital mastering engineer found he didn't have to do anything to them but transfer the original 3-track stereo masters to digital. The recordings remain state-of-the-art nearly 50 years later.

== Discography ==
=== Original LPs ===
- Taboo, Hi-Fi Records SR806, 1958
- Hawaiian Sunset, Hi-Fi Records SR807, 1958
- Bwana A, Hi-Fi Records SR808, 1958
- Legend of Pele, Hi-Fi Records SR813, 1958
- Leis of Jazz, Hi-Fi Records SR607, 1959
- Bahia, Hi-Fi Records SR815, 1959
- Arthur Lyman on Broadway, Hi-Fi Records SR818, 1959
- Taboo 2, Hi-Fi Records SR822, 1959
- Percussion Spectacular! (reissued as Yellow Bird), Hi-Fi Records L-1004, 1960
- The Colorful Percussions of Arthur Lyman, Hi-Fi Records L-1005, 1962
- Many Moods of Arthur Lyman, Hi-Fi Records L-1007, 1962
- I Wish You Love (reissued as Love for Sale), Hi-Fi Records L-1009, 1963
- Cotton Fields, Hi-Fi Records L-1010, 1963
- Blowin' in the Wind, Hi-Fi Records L-1014, 1963
- At the Crescendo, Crescendo GNP 605, 1963
- Paradise (reissued as Pearly Shells), Crescendo GNP 606, 1964
- Cast Your Fate to the Wind, Crescendo GNP 607 (reissue of At the Crescendo), 1965
- Mele Kalikimaka (Merry Christmas), Hi-Fi Records L-1018, 1964
- Isle of Enchantment, Hi-Fi Records L-1023, 1964
- Call of the Midnight Sun, Hi-Fi Records L-1024, 1965
- Hawaiian Sunset Vol. II, Hi-Fi Records L-1025, 1965 (compilation)
- Polynesia, Hi-Fi Records L-1027, 1965
- Arthur Lyman's Greatest Hits, Hi-Fi Records SL-1030, 1965 (compilation)
- Lyman '66, Hi-Fi Records SL-1031, 1966
- The Shadow of Your Smile, Hi-Fi Records SL-1033, 1966
- Aloha, Amigo, Hi-Fi Records SL-1034, 1966
- Ilikai, Hi-Fi Records SL-1035, 1967
- At The Port of Los Angeles, Hi-Fi Records SL-1036, 1967 (compilation)
- Latitude 20, Hi-Fi Records SL-1037, 1968
- Aphrodisia, Hi-Fi Records SL-1038, 1968
- The Winners Circle, Hi-Fi Records SL-1039, 1968
- Today's Greatest Hits, Hi-Fi Records SL-1040, 1968
- Puka Shells, Crescendo GNPS-2091, 1975
- Authentic Hawaiian Favorites, Olympic Records 6161, 1979 (compilation)
- Song of the Islands, Piccadilly ASI 5436, 1980 (compilation)
- Island Vibes, Broad Records BRS-1009, 1980 (solo vibes with surf sounds)

=== Appears as a guest ===
- Exotica '90 by Martin Denny, Toshiba EMI/Insideout TOCP-6160 (1990)

=== CD reissues ===
- Music of Hawaii, Legacy/DNA CD 323, 1990 (compilation)
- Taboo: The Exotic Sounds of the Arthur Lyman Group, DCC Compact Classics CD DJZ-613, 1991 (compilation)
- Pearly Shells, GNP-Crescendo CD GNPD 606, 1993 (reissue with bonus tracks)
- The Exotic Sounds Of Arthur Lyman, Legacy/DNA CD 417 (reissue of Taboo and Yellow Bird), 1996
- Music for a Bachelor's Den, Vol. 5: The Best of the Arthur Lyman Group, DCC Compact Classics CD DZS 095, 1996 (compilation)
- Music for a Bachelor's Den, Vol. 6: More of the Best of the Arthur Lyman Group, DCC Compact Classics CD DZS 096, 1996 (compilation)
- Sonic Sixties, Ryko TCD 1031 CD, 1996 (compilation)
- With a Christmas Vibe, Ryko CD 50363 (reissue of Mele Kalikimaka), 1996
- Taboo, Ryko CD 50364, 1996 (reissue with bonus tracks)
- Hawaiian Sunset, Ryko CD 50365, 1996 (reissue with bonus tracks)
- Taboo, Vol.2, Ryko CD 50430, 1998 (reissue with bonus tracks)
- Leis of Jazz, Ryko CD 50431, 1998 (reissue with bonus tracks)
- The Legend of Pele, Ryko CD 50432, 1998 (reissue with bonus tracks)
- Yellow Bird, Ryko CD 50433, 1998 (reissue with bonus tracks)
- The Very Best of Arthur Lyman, Varèse Sarabande, 2002 (compilation)
- Music of Hawaii, Arc Music, 2002 (compilation)
- Taboo: The Greatest Hits of Arthur Lyman, Empire Musicwerks, 2004 (compilation)
- Songs of Hawaii, Grammercy, 2004 (compilation)
- Puka Shells, BCI Eclipse, 2005 (reissue)
- The Singles Collection, Acrobat, 2007 (compilation)
- Merry Christmas, Essential Media Group, 2007 (reissue of Mele Kalikimaka)
- Hits Anthology, Essential Media Group, 2007 (compilation)
- Essential Gold, Essential Media Group, 2008 (compilation)
- Bwana A / Bahia, Collectors' Choice Music CCM8912, 2008
- Arthur Lyman On Broadway / The Colorful Percussions of Arthur Lyman, Collectors' Choice Music CCM8922, 2008
- The Many Moods of Arthur Lyman / Love For Sale, Collectors' Choice Music CCM8932, 2008
- Cottonfields / Blowin' In The Wind, Collectors' Choice Music CCM8942, 2008
- Isle of Enchantment / Polynesia, Collectors' Choice Music CCM8952, 2008
- Lyman '66 / The Shadow of Your Smile, Collectors' Choice Music CCM8962, 2008
- Ilikai / At The Port of Los Angeles, Collectors' Choice Music CCM8972, 2008
- Latitude 20 / Aphrodesia, Collectors' Choice Music CCM8982, 2008
- Winner's Circle / Today's Greatest Hits, Collectors' Choice Music CCM8992, 2008
- Return to Paradise, Classic Records, 2011 (compilation)
- Eight Classic Albums, Real Gone Jazz RGJCD310, 2012 (compilation of first 8 LPs onto 4 CDs)
- Christmas in Hawaii, Holiday Classic Records, 2012 (re-issue of Mele Kalikimaka, re-sequenced)
- Isle of Golden Dreams, Broken Audio, 2012 (compilation)
- Isle of Enchantment, Essential Media Group, 2013
- Caravan, Digital 45, 2013 (compilation)
- Yellow Bird, Digital 45, 2013 (compilation)
- Taboo, Digital 45, 2013 (compilation)
- Magic-Islands, Broken Audio, 2014 (compilation)
- Hilawe, Vintage Music, 2014 (compilation)
- Vibin' On The Sixties, Essential Media Group, 2015 (compilation)
- Totally Taboo, Jasmine Records, 2021 (Taboo & Taboo Tu reissue on 1-CD)
- Autumn Moon, Kosma, 2022 (compilation)
- Lush Exotica, Righteous 114D, 2023 (Taboo, Leis of Jazz, Bahia, & Bwana Á reissue on 2-CDs)

== Related ==
In May 2014, Alika Lyman, the great-nephew of Arthur Lyman, released a tribute album titled Leis of Jazz, Vol. 2 which featured songs and cover art that paid homage to Arthur Lyman's original Leis of Jazz album.

== See also ==
- Gene Rains
- Les Baxter
