= Martin Denny =

American pianist, composer, and arranger (1911–2005)

- Born: April 10, 1911; New York City, New York, U.S.
- Died: March 2, 2005 (aged 93) Honolulu, Hawaii, U.S.
- Genres: Exotica, lounge music
- Occupations: Musician; composer; arranger; bandleader; publisher
- Instruments: Piano; marimba; vibes; bongos; congas; timbales; Burmese gongs
- Label: Liberty

Martin Denny (April 10, 1911 – March 2, 2005) was an American pianist, composer, and arranger. Known as the "father of exotica", he was a multi-instrumentalist and could play a number of percussion instruments. In a long career that saw him performing up to 3 weeks prior to his death, he toured the world popularizing his brand of lounge music which included exotic percussion, imaginative rearrangements of popular songs, and original songs that celebrated Tiki culture.

== Biography ==
Denny was born in New York City and raised in Los Angeles. He studied classical piano and toured South America for four and a half years in the 1930s with the Don Dean Orchestra. This tour began Denny's fascination with Latin rhythms. Denny collected a large number of ethnic instruments from all over the world, which he used to spice up his stage performances.

After serving in the United States Army Air Forces in World War II, Denny returned to Los Angeles in 1945 where he studied piano and composition under Dr. Wesley La Violette and orchestration under Arthur Lange at the Los Angeles Conservatory of Music. He later studied at the University of Southern California.

In January 1954, Don the Beachcomber brought Denny to Honolulu, for a two-week engagement. He stayed to form his own combo in 1955, performing under contract at the Shell Bar in the Hawaiian Village on Oahu and soon signing to Liberty Records. The original combo consisted of Augie Colon on percussion and birdcalls, Arthur Lyman on vibes, John Kramer on string bass, and Denny on piano. Lyman soon left to form his own group and future Herb Alpert sideman and Baja Marimba Band founder Julius Wechter replaced him. Harvey Ragsdale later replaced Kramer.

"We traveled a lot on the Mainland, but we came back every 12 weeks because the guys had their families here [in Hawaii]," recalled Denny. In 1955, the musician met his future wife, June, and married her the following year. His daughter, Christina was born a few years later. "I loved the lifestyle and my career was built here," said Denny.

Denny described the music his combo played as "window dressing, a background". He built a collection of strange and exotic instruments with the help of several airline friends. They would bring these intruments back to Denny, and he would build arrangements around them. His music was a combination of ethnic styles: South Pacific, the Orient and Latin rhythms.

During an engagement at the Shell Bar, Denny discovered what would become his trademark and the birth of "exotica". The bar had a very exotic setting: a little pool of water right outside the bandstand, rocks and palm trees growing around, very quiet and relaxed. As the group played at night, Denny became aware of bullfrogs croaking. The croaking blended with the music and when the band stopped, so did the frogs. He thought it was a coincidence at first, but when he tried the tune again later, the same thing happened. This time, his bandmates began doing all sorts of tropical bird calls as a gag. The band thought it nothing more than a joke. The next day, someone approached Denny and asked if he would do the arrangement with the birds and frogs. He agreed. At rehearsal, he had the band do "Quiet Village" with each doing a bird call spaced apart. Denny did the frog part on a grooved cylinder and the whole thing became incorporated into the arrangement of "Quiet Village". It sold more than one million copies, and was awarded a gold disc.

The album jacket was an influential factor guiding the fantasy of Denny's music. Denny's first dozen albums featured model Sandy Warner on the cover.

Art designers always changed her looks to fit the mood of the package. For instance, we called one album with an African sound Afro-desia and Sandy dyed her hair blond for the photo session; she's seen against a background of colorful African masks. When we did Hypnotique, which is surrealistic, she had dark hair. For Primitiva, she was photographed standing waist-deep in water.

The Exotica album was recorded in December 1956 and released in 1957. In 1958, Dick Clark hosted Denny on American Bandstand. "Quiet Village" reached number two on Billboard's charts in 1959 with the Exotica album reaching number one. He rode the charts of Cashbox and Variety also. Denny had as many as three or four albums on the charts simultaneously during his career. He had national hits with "A Taste of Honey", "The Enchanted Sea", and "Ebb Tide".

Denny died in Honolulu on March 2, 2005, aged 93. Following a private memorial service, his ashes were scattered at sea.

== Legacy ==
His combo spawned two successful offshoots: Julius Wechter (of Tijuana Brass and Baja Marimba Band fame) and exotica vibist Arthur Lyman.

Denny's "Firecracker" is well known in Japan as the number which inspired Haruomi Hosono to establish Yellow Magic Orchestra; a "subversive" version of the song, according to Hosono, appears on the band's eponymous debut album and was released as a single to promote it, charting at No. 60 on the Billboard Hot 100 and No. 18 on the Billboard R&B singles charts. The song was later adapted into Jennifer Lopez's "I'm Real".

Former Psychic TV member Fred Giannelli released an album in 1991 entitled Fred; the second track on that album is "Mr. Denny", an instrumental tribute to Martin Denny that features excerpts of an interview with him.

Denny's recordings are prominently featured in the 1999 film Breakfast of Champions, based on the Kurt Vonnegut novel. This is primarily because the car dealership featured in the film is having a Hawaiian-based promotion.

Denny's music is a recurring theme in the Sandman Slim series of fantasy novels by Richard Kadrey, where his music is always playing on the jukebox in the Bamboo House of Dolls, "LA's only punk tiki bar".

== Discography ==
=== Studio albums ===
- Exotica, Liberty LRP-3034 (mono) (1957)
- Exotica, Liberty LST-7034 (stereo) (1958) - re-recorded for stereo with Julius Wechter replacing Arthur Lyman
- Exotica Vol.2, Liberty LRP-3077/LST-7006 (1958)
- Forbidden Island, Liberty LRP-3081/LST-7001 (1958)
- Primitiva, Liberty LRP-3087/LST-7023 (1958)
- Hypnotique, Liberty LRP-3102/LST-7102 (1959)
- Afro-Desia, Liberty LRP-3111/LST-7111 (1959)
- Exotica Volume III, Liberty LRP-3116/LST-7116 (1959, No. 50)
- Quiet Village: The Exotic Sounds of Martin Denny, Liberty LRP-3122/LST-7122 (1959)
- The Enchanted Sea, Liberty LRP-3141/LST-7141 (1960)
- Exotic Sounds from the Silver Screen, Liberty LRP-3158/LST-7158 (1960)
- Exotic Sounds Visit Broadway, Liberty LRP-3163/LST-7163 (1960)
- Exotic Percussion, Liberty LRP-3168/LST-7168 (1961)
- Romantica, Liberty LRP-3207/LST-7207 (1961)
- Martin Denny in Person, Liberty LRP-3224/LST-7224 (1962)
- A Taste of Honey, Liberty LRP-3237/LST-7237 (1962, No. 6)
- Exotica Suite with Si Zentner, Liberty LSS-14020 (1962)
- Maryland Club's Golden Moments, MC-2 (1962)
- Another Taste of Honey, Liberty LRP-3277/LST-7277 (1963)
- The Versatile Martin Denny, Liberty LRP-3307/LST-7307 (1963)
- A Taste of Hits, Liberty LRP-3328/LST-7328 (1964)
- Latin Village, Liberty LRP-3378/LST-7378 (1964)
- Hawaii Tattoo, Liberty LRP-3394/LST-7394 (1964, No. 123)
- Spanish Village, Liberty LRP-3409/LST-7409 (1965)
- 20 Golden Hawaiian Hits, Liberty LRP-3415/LST-7415 (1965)
- Martin Denny!, Liberty LRP-3438/LST-7438 (1966)
- Hawaii Goes A Go-Go, Liberty LRP-3445/LST-7445 (1966)
- Exotica Today, Liberty LRP-3465/LST-7465 (1966)
- Golden Greats, Liberty LRP-3467/LST-7467 (1966)
- Hawaii, Liberty LRP-3488/LST-7488 (1966)
- Paradise Moods, Liberty/Sunset SUM-1102/SUS-5102 (1966)
- Exotica Classica, Liberty LRP-3513/LST-7513 (1967)
- A Taste of India, Liberty LRP-3550/LST-7550 (1968)
- Exotic Love, Liberty LRP-3585/LST-7585 (1968)
- Exotic Moog, Liberty LRP-3621/LST-7621 (1969)
- Sayonara, Liberty/Sunset SUM-5169/SUS-5169 (1970)
- Exotic Night, Liberty/Sunset SUM-5199/SUS-5199 (1970)
- From Maui with Love, First American FA-7743 (1980)
- The Enchanted Isle, Liberty LN-10195 (1982)
- Exotica '90, Toshiba EMI/Insideout TOCP-6160 (1990)

=== Compilations and reissues ===
- The Best of Martin Denny, Liberty LX-5502 (1961) (compilation)
- The Very Best of Martin Denny, United Artists UA-LA383-E (1975) (compilation)
- Enchanted Islands, CEMA Special Products S21-56638 (1984) (cassette compilation)
- The Exotic Sounds: The Very Best of Martin Denny, EMI Manhattan (Japan) CP32-5657 (1989) (compilation)
- Paradise, Pair PCD-2-1267 (1990) (compilation)
- Exotica!: The Best of Martin Denny, Rhino R2-70774 (1990) (compilation)
- The Exotic Sounds of Martin Denny, Capitol (1990) (compilation)
- Quiet Village: The Exotic Sounds of Martin Denny, Curb D2-77685 (1994) (compilation)
- Exotic Moog (Martin Denny) / Moog Rock (Les Baxter), Electronic Vanguard EV-906-2 (1995) (bootleg reissue)
- Afro-Desia, Scamp 9702 (1995) (reissue)
- Bachelor in Paradise: The Best of Martin Denny, Pair (1996) (compilation)
- Exotica/Exotica Vol. II, Scamp 9712 (1996) (reissue)
- Forbidden Island/Primitiva, Scamp 9713 (1996) (reissue)
- Hypnotique/Exotica III, Scamp 9714 (1997) (reissue)
- Quiet Village/Enchanted Sea, Scamp 9715 (1997) (reissue)
- Baked Alaska, Collector's Choice Music CCM-393-2 (2003) (live in 1964)
- The Exotic Sounds of Martin Denny, Rev-Ola (2004) (compilation)
- Exotica, Rev-Ola (2005) (reissue)
- Exotica Vol. 2, Rev-Ola (2005) (reissue)
- Hypnotique, Rev-Ola (2005) (reissue)
- Primitiva, Rev-Ola (2005) (reissue)
- Forbidden Island, Rev-Ola (2006) (reissue)
- Quiet Village, Rev-Ola (2006) (reissue)
- Exotica III, Rev-Ola (2006) (reissue)
- Afro-Desia, Rev-Ola (2006) (reissue)
- Latin Village, Toshiba EMI (Japan) (2006) (reissue)
- The Best of Martin Denny's Exotica, Capitol (2006) (compilation)
- Hypnotique, Vivid Sound (Japan) (2007) (reissue)
- Hypnotique, Hallmark (2015) (reissue, non-Sandy Warner cover)

== See also ==
- Sandy Warner
