= Simon Waronker =

American record producer (1915–2005)

Simon Waronker (March 4, 1915 – June 7, 2005) was an American violinist and record producer from Los Angeles, California, best known for co-founding Liberty Records.

== Biography ==
Graduating from high school at 13 years old, he won a scholarship to study music in France. Waronker began to establish his music career in Germany, but was forced to return to the United States when Nazi Party members began to threaten Jews. From 1939 to 1955, Waronker recorded music for 20th Century Fox films. At least one source described this role as an orchestra contractor. He then chose to enter the music industry independently, co-founding Liberty Records and serving as its chairman.

The first artist he signed was popular singer Julie London.

One of the major acts who recorded on Liberty Records was The Chipmunks, actually Ross Bagdasarian, who recorded as David Seville. Seville named The Chipmunks (Alvin, Simon, and Theodore) after Liberty Records executives Alvin Bennett, Simon Waronker, and Theodore Keep, respectively.

In 1963, facing health problems, Waronker sold his interest in Liberty to the electronics firm Avnet.

He died in 2005 at age 90 and is buried at Hillside Memorial Park Cemetery in Culver City, California.

Record producer Lenny Waronker is Simon's son. Lenny has five children; musicians Joey Waronker and Anna Waronker, interior designer Katherine Waronker, Lily Waronker, and Grace Waronker.
