= Exotica =

American music genre

- Stylistic origins: Jazz; space age pop; world music; light music
- Cultural origins: 1950s, United States
- Typical instruments: Conga, bongos, vibraphone, Indonesian and Burmese gongs, boobams, Tahitian log, Chinese bell tree, and Japanese kotos

Audio sample
- "Quiet Village," by Martin Denny: file; help
- Derivative forms: Lounge music

Exotica is a musical genre that was popular during the 1950s to mid-1960s with Americans who came of age during World War II. The term was coined by Simon "Si" Waronker of Liberty Records in reference to Martin Denny's 1957 album Exotica.

Exotica's sound is characterized as being evocative of a time and a place that is geographically far removed from the listener, largely instrumental and combining American jazz and pop music with influences from the Indigenous musics of Oceania, Southeast Asia, Latin America, and Africa, and frequently containing jungle-like sound effects such as bird calls. However, exotica was not intended as faithful renditions of international music traditions: Denny described the musical style as "a combination of the South Pacific and the Orient...what a lot of people imagined the islands to be like...it's pure fantasy though."

== History ==
Les Baxter's Ritual of the Savage (Le Sacre du Sauvage) is one of the definitive albums of the exotica genre.

Les Baxter's 1951 album Ritual of the Savage (Le Sacre du Sauvage) became an early cornerstone of exotica. This album featured lush orchestral arrangements along with tribal rhythms and contained the first version of the genre standard "Quiet Village". As the 1950s progressed, Baxter carved out a niche in this area, producing a number of titles in this style including Tamboo! (1956), Caribbean Moonlight (1956), Ports of Pleasure (1957), The Sacred Idol (1960) and Jewels of the Sea (1961). Baxter cited Maurice Ravel and Igor Stravinsky as influences on his work.

In 1957, Martin Denny recorded a version of "Quiet Village" with imitation bird calls and a vibraphone, instead of strings, which established the sound of the Polynesian-styled music. The song reached #2 on Billboard's charts in 1959, with the parent Exotica album reaching #1. Soon the new technology of stereophonic sound further opened up the musical palettes of Denny and other prominent exotica artists such as Arthur Lyman and Juan García Esquivel.

The distinctive sound of exotica relies on a variety of instruments: conga, bongos, vibes, Indonesian and Burmese gongs, boo bams (bamboo sticks), Tahitian log, Chinese bell tree, and Japanese kotos. Additionally intrinsic to the sound of exotica are sound effects including bird calls, big-cat roars, and primate shrieks. Though there are some standards that contain lyrics (including those by Yma Sumac), singing is rare.

Raymond Scott is sometimes recognized as a precursor to exotica, as several of his songs were written with the intent of transporting the listener to exotic locations via novelty instruments and sound effects.

As a result of the popularity of exotica during the late 1950s, a large number of records were released that featured covers of recently released exotica songs (mainly by Les Baxter) and Hawaiian and easy-listening standards. These recordings included "Exotica" by Ted Auletta, "Exotic Percussion" by Stanley Black and his Orchestra, "Orienta" by Gerald Fried, "Taboo" and "Taboo 2" by Arthur Lyman and "The Sounds of Exotic Island" by The Surfmen. Some composers pushed the bounds of the genre by producing albums of original content, often with unusual instrumentation. These recordings include Voodoo by Robert Drasnin, Africana by Chaino, Pagan Festival by Dominic Frontiere And His Orchestra, and White Goddess by Frank Hunter. By 1959, the majority of American record labels had released at least one exotica-themed album, usually utilizing composers and musicians that produced jazz, classical or easy listening recordings.

After several years of rising excitement leading up to Hawaiian statehood in 1959, the Hawaiiana fad waned in the United States, and so did exotica's commercial appeal.

== Revival ==
In 1971, library music composers Roger Roger and Nino Nardini released the album Jungle Obsession on the French Neuilly record label. Although clearly influenced by the exotica arrangements of Baxter, Martin Denny, Frank Hunter and Dick Hyman, it went beyond the simpler themes used by those composers to employ "a series of motifs, leitmotifs, and modes that were out of the musical sphere at the time: they took rock and classical and bossa and jazz and easy listening, wove them together with polyrhythmic invention and a boatload of sound effects".

In the 1990s exotica resurfaced more generally, along with a new category in which to place the genre: lounge. Dozens of long out-of-print LPs were reissued on CD. The revival accompanied a related swing revival and appreciation for tiki culture. A new crop of bands, such as Pink Martini and Combustible Edison, recorded music heavily indebted to the style.

The early 2000s saw additional exotica revival efforts, such as Hawaii-based Don Tiki, the comeback of 1960s composer Robert Drasnin, Waitiki 7, The Martini Kings, The Tikiyaki Orchestra, Kava Kon, and Hawaii Music Award winning Tiki Joe's Ocean, formed by multi-instrumentalist/composer Andy Nazzal. The Florida-based ensemble called Stolen Idols followed in the tradition of Robert Drasnin by playing new music composed by their leader, Drew Farmer, along with some reinterpreted classics. Their album Moonlight Offerings was a welcome contribution to the genre. They were for a few years regular performers at the Hukilau festival. After a lengthy hiatus, they have recently come back together.

Several podcasts broadcast classic and new exotica and tiki revival music, such as The Quiet Village Podcast, Lounge King Radio, and Exotic Tiki Island. In late 2024, San Francisco online radio station SOMA FM started a tiki and exotica-focused stream called Tiki Time. In 2025 the exotica artist Arnold Mars released a debut exotica album titled Lost Island.

== See also ==
- Orientalism
- World music
- Worldbeat
