= Paper umbrella =

There are two types of paper umbrella:

- Oil-paper umbrella, for covering a person
- Cocktail umbrella, for decorating drinks
