= Victory roll =

Victory roll may refer to:

- A pin in professional wrestling
- Aileron roll, an aerobatic maneuver
- Victory roll (hairstyle), a women's hairstyle
