= Tiki culture =

Pseudo-Polynesian decor and themes

- 1933–present
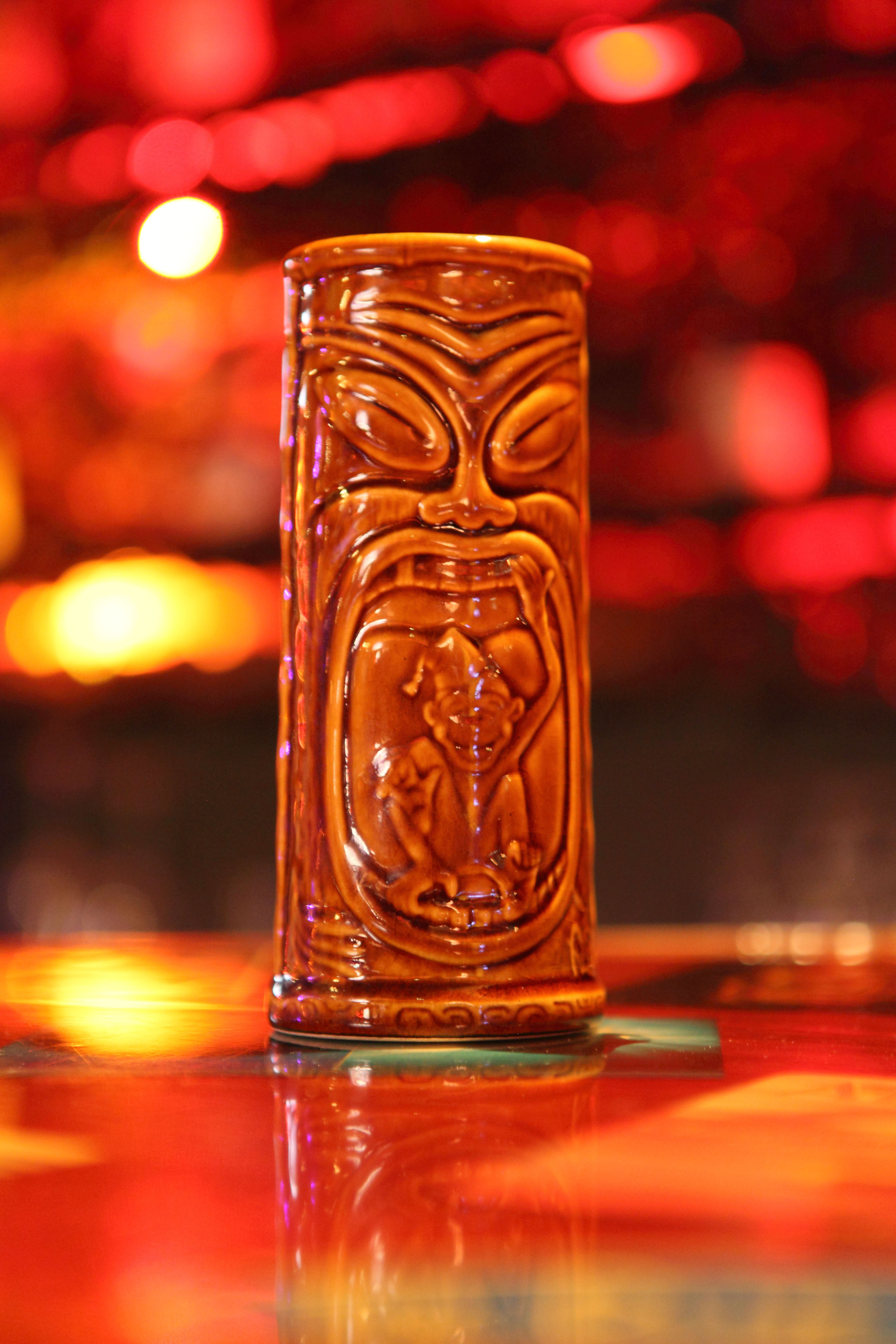
- A typical "Tiki" mug
- Location: United States

Tiki culture is an American-originated art, music, and entertainment movement inspired by Polynesian, Melanesian, and Micronesian cultures, and by Oceanian art. Influences on Tiki culture include the various cultures of Australasia, Melanesia, Micronesia, Polynesia, the Caribbean Islands, and Hawaii. The name comes from Tiki, the Māori name for the first human, often represented in the form of hei-tiki, a pendant and important taonga. The hei-tiki was often appropriated by Europeans as a commercialised good luck charm, hence the name of Tiki culture. Despite the Pacific Islands spanning over 10,000 miles (16,000 kilometers) and including many different unrelated cultures, religions, and languages, Tiki aesthetic is considered by some to be amalgamated into one "fantasia of trans-Pacific cultures" and "colonial nostalgia". Because of this, and the simplistic view of the Pacific taken by the aesthetic, Tiki culture has often proved controversial.

Tiki culture initially extended to decorate themed bars and restaurants, catering to Americans' views of the South Pacific. Featuring Tiki carvings and complex, alluringly named alcoholic drinks, it eventually influenced residential recreation. It became one of the primary ways, although indirectly, that New Zealand culture influenced that of the United States. Beginning in California in the 1930s and then spreading around the world, Tiki culture was inspired by the sentimental appeal of an idealized South Pacific, particularly Polynesia, as viewed through the experiences of tourists and Hollywood movies, incorporating beautiful scenery, forbidden love, and the potential for danger. Over time, it selectively incorporated more cultural elements (and imagined aspects) of other regions such as Southeast Asia. While the decor and ambiance at these establishments largely draws from Polynesian influences, the cocktails are inspired by the tropical drinks and ingredients of the Caribbean.

Tiki culture changed over time, influenced by World War II and the firsthand exposure hundreds of thousands of American servicemen gained during that conflict. In time its appeal wore off, and both the culture and the hospitality industry theme saw a decline. The early decades of the 21st century have seen a renaissance of interest in Tiki culture, including a limited commercial revival. In addition, it has attracted people interested in cocktails, history, urban archaeology, and retroism. However, the appropriation of indigenous Pacific cultures has become increasingly challenged as culturally insensitive or racist.

== Name ==
Tiki is the first human in Māori mythology, and also a wooden image of him.

The word "tiki" was used to describe the style of the tropical islands of the South Pacific starting in the late 1930s, a usage that is "unknown to the languages of the Pacific." It was applied early on to "tiki punch," "tiki rooms," "tiki torches," and so on. By the 1950s, restaurants often used the word to describe Polynesian-themed "tiki bars" and "tiki rooms."

The term "tiki culture" emerged in the 1990s to describe the revival of the style.

== Origin ==
Bird of Paradise (1932)

Tiki culture began at the end of Prohibition in 1933 with the opening of Don's Beachcomber, a Polynesian-themed bar and restaurant in Hollywood, California. The proprietor was Ernest Raymond Beaumont-Gantt, a young man from Texas and New Orleans who had done some rum-running with his father and claimed to have sailed throughout much of the Pacific Ocean. The restaurant's name was later changed to Don the Beachcomber, and Beaumont-Gantt legally changed his name to Donn Beach. His restaurant featured Cantonese cuisine and exotic rum cocktails and punch drinks, with a décor of flaming torches, rattan furniture, flower leis, and brightly colored fabrics that looked like imagery out of the popular movies that were helping to fuel the desires of the average American to travel the Pacific.

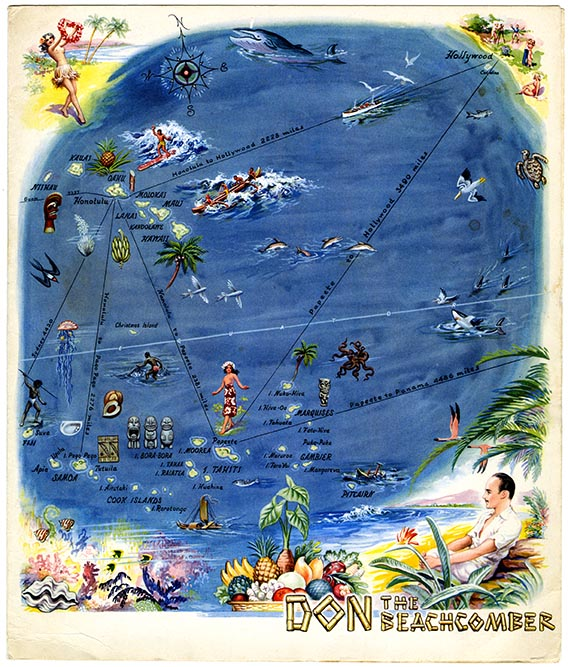
Don the Beachcomber restaurant menu cover

In 1936, a restaurant owner from Oakland, California, Victor Bergeron, ate at the Don the Beachcomber restaurant. Bergeron said: "We went to a place called the South Seas...and even visited Don the Beachcomber in Hollywood. In fact, I even bought some stuff from Don the Beachcomber. When I got back to Oakland I told my wife what I had seen, we agreed to change the name of our restaurant and our décor." The renamed restaurant, as well as his new nickname, became Trader Vic's. Bergeron adopted the new persona in a manner to imitate Beach's theatrics and further perpetuate the illusions of Hollywood, telling people that the leg he had lost to tuberculosis had been the result of being attacked by a shark.

Other restaurants such as Clifton's Cafeteria also had begun introducing grand decorations based on non-traditional and "kitschy" themes. Clifton's was heavily remodeled in 1939 to become Clifton's South Seas. The exterior and interior were decorated with 12 waterfalls, volcanic rock, and tropical foliage. It supposedly even featured a "sherbet-gushing volcano".

The décor of both the inside and the outside of the restaurants was often painstakingly created with decorations from around the world. Joseph Stephen Crane, the owner of the later The Luau restaurant, began his menu with a list of the places of origin of his building materials. It included not just Hawaii but virtually all areas of Oceania, as well as furniture from Hong Kong and "man eating clam shells" from the Indian Ocean.

Early tiki restaurants, although not called that at the time, attempted to walk a fine line between the reality and myth of what they were creating, acknowledging that much of it was Hollywood hocus-pocus but also trying to create an atmosphere of authenticity. Crane's later restaurant menus stated: "You have just passed the gangplank into another world – into a segment of Paradise – or such is the illusion we of THE LUAU hope to create. And truly it is more than an illusion for there is authenticity in the adventure you are about to experience... Both food and drink are prepared under the matchless guidance of the one and only Dr. Foo Fong... Our drink specialties, Island Symphonies of rare and distinguished rums, irresistibly claim your fullest respect which is best shown by drinking slowly and reverently".

South Seas genre movies leading up to this period included White Shadows in the South Seas (1928), The Love Trader (1928), and Bird of Paradise (1932). Beach frequently interacted with movie stars, inviting them to his home for luau-like dinners and becoming friends with actors such as Clark Gable.

Hei Tiki was released in 1935, with a New York Times review describing the plot as being about "a chieftain's daughter who is declared tabu and destined to be the bride of the war god". It attributed the title to mean "love charm", in reference to Hei-tiki pendants sometimes associated with fertility. Waikiki Wedding, starring Bing Crosby and Martha Raye, was released in 1937 with the popular song "Blue Hawaii", as was Her Jungle Love in 1938, starring Dorothy Lamour.

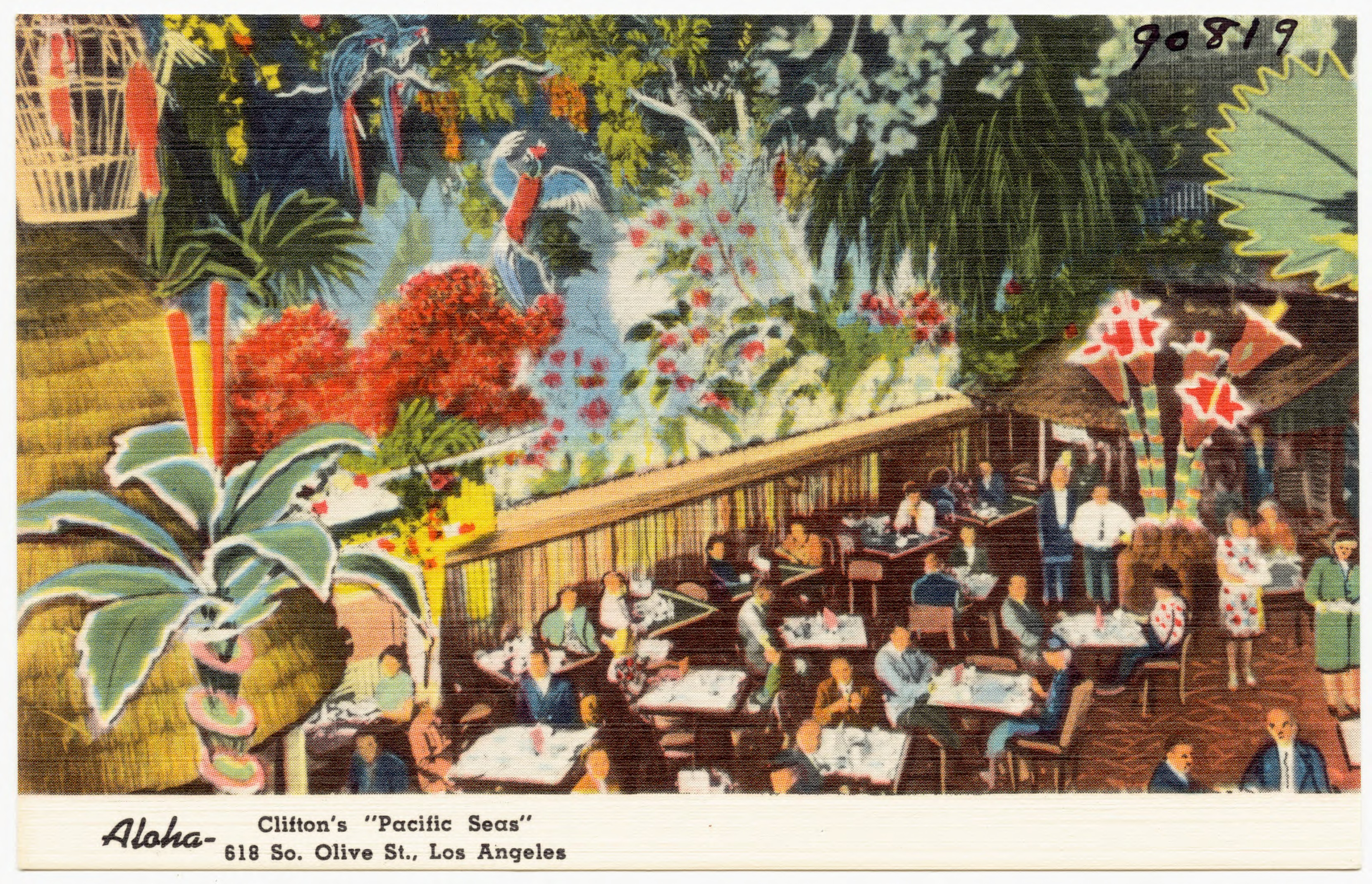
Clifton's South Seas cafeteria

During a time when overseas civilian China Clipper air travel was still uncommon, the Hawaiian Steamship Company's Matson Line also continued its aggressive advertising campaigns promoting a leisurely but still exotic island lifestyle, led by famous photographers such as Edward Steichen and Anton Bruehl and featuring actresses such as Jinx Falkenburg (later in Sweetheart of the Fleet and Tahiti Nights). Matson commissioned artists to design memorable keepsake menus for the voyages.

Between the Matson Line's advertising, new restaurants and continual cinematic exposure, the theme began to take on a life of its own. California's World's Fair in 1939 – the Golden Gate International Exposition – celebrated for the first time Polynesian culture in the United States. The feature of the fair was "Pageant of the Pacific", primarily showcasing the goods of nations bordering the Pacific Ocean. At its opening ceremonies President Franklin Roosevelt spoke of friendship and the co-mingled destinies between the United States and Pacific countries, a sentiment physically symbolized in part with the incorporation of a giant, 80-foot statue, Pacifica. World War II would greatly test those ambitions.

== Post-World War II ==
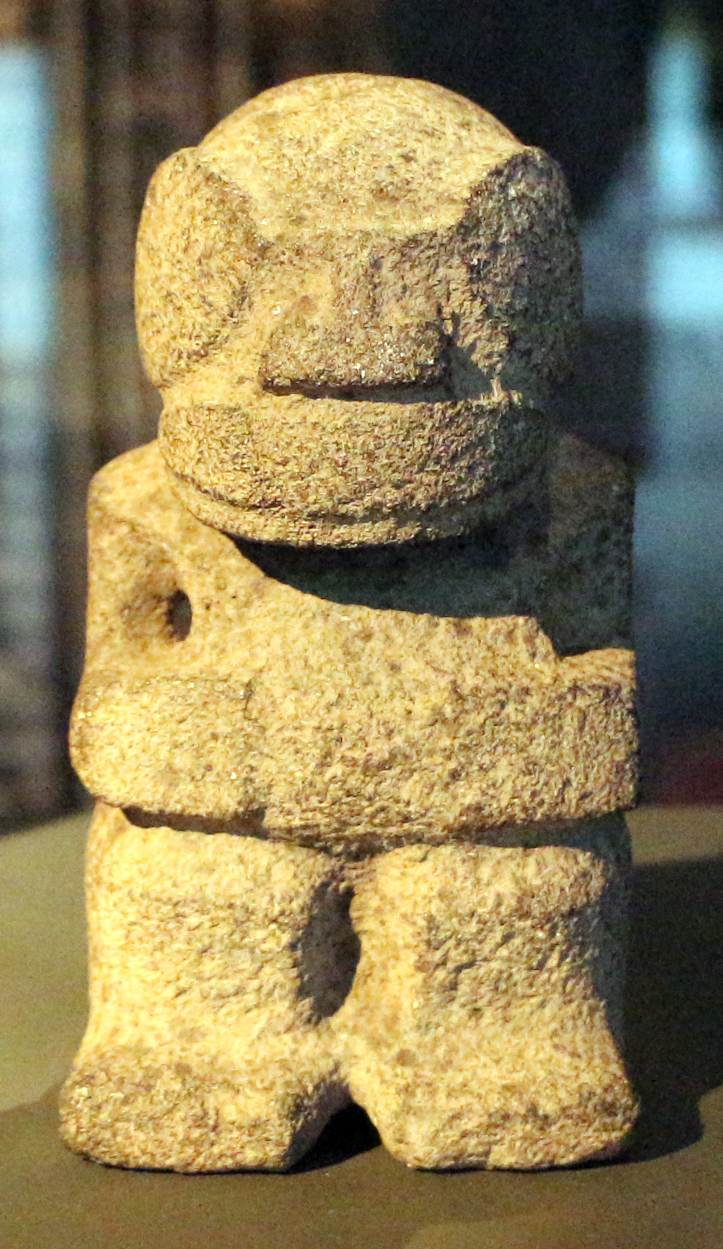
Tiki carvings began to play a more prominent role after WWII

When American servicemen returned home after the end of World War II in 1945, they brought with them stories and souvenirs from their time in the South Pacific that helped to reinforce the popularity of what Hollywood had set the stage for Donn Beach to create. Beach was himself a World War II veteran, and he had invented the Three Dots & A Dash cocktail, which is Morse code for "V" (for victory). Women wore "victory roll" hairstyles and people were in the mood to celebrate.

The excitement surrounding Thor Heyerdahl's 1947 Kon-Tiki expedition, followed by the book in 1948 and a movie in 1950, helped promote tropical exploration. Importantly within the context of tiki culture, it successfully injected the word "tiki" into the popular American lexicon on a large scale (Hawaiians had not used the word "tiki", but rather "kiʻi"). Heyerdahl's work also expanded the theme's mythology to include the west coast of South America in what became an ever increasing mix of cultural motifs, both real and imagined. Easter Island statues (moai) also became iconic with the publication of his book Aku-Aku.

Steven Crane of The Luau restaurant took advantage of the public's fascination with Heyerdahl and further followed in the footsteps of Beach and Bergeron by building a chain of tiki restaurants in partnership with Sheraton Hotels called Kon-Tiki Ports. Crane is generally credited with also bringing tiki to the forefront of decorations at such restaurants and bars, prominently placing their image on his menu covers, matchbooks, entry ways, and other signage. Southern Pacific themes continued to stray more into the even further imagined realm of the mysterious "tiki".

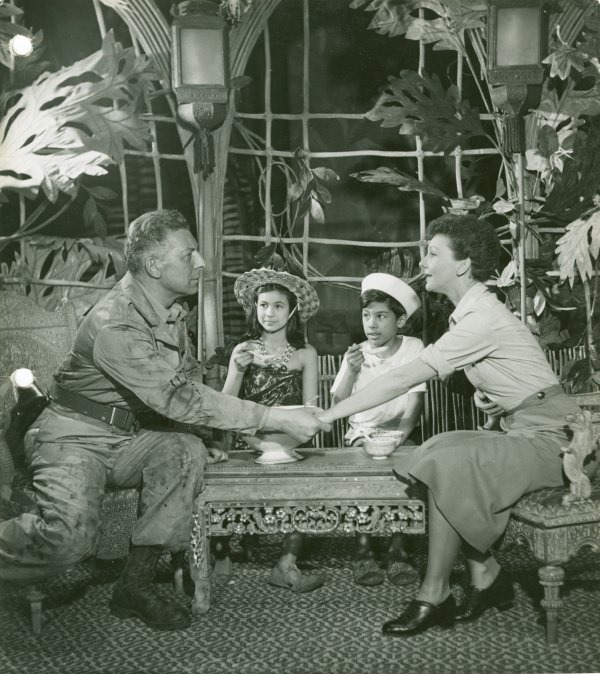
Scene from South Pacific

James Michener won the 1948 Pulitzer Prize for his collection of short stories, Tales of the South Pacific, which in turn was the basis for South Pacific, the 1949 musical by Rodgers and Hammerstein that included the song "Bali Ha'i" about a mystical tropical island. The Bali Hai restaurant opened a few years later on San Diego's Shelter Island, introducing its faux-tiki mascot and signature cocktail, the Mr. Bali Hai.

In addition to the returning World War II veterans, several other factors contributed to the mid-century American explosion in tiki culture. Post-war America saw the rise of the middle class as an economic force. This coupled with ever-increasing affordability of travel, particularly newly established civilian air travel to Hawaii (which had been halted during the war), helped to propel the nation's disposable income into all things tropical. Just as the Matson Line had done with their boats, the airlines aggressively marketed flights to consumers.

Donn Beach moved to Hawaii, where he later lived on a houseboat and was a driving force behind the 1956 creation of the International Market Place in Waikiki. He opened a Don the Beachcomber there, along with the Dagger Bar and created a treehouse office in the top of a giant banyan tree that oversaw a complex of multiple thatch-roofed buildings and huts that sold a variety of goods from around the tropical world. Other tiki bars opened in Hawaii as well, initially staffed by native bartenders who did not recognize the allegedly Hawaiian drinks that American tourists were requesting. Hawaiian bartender Harry Yee created the iconic Blue Hawaii cocktail in 1957. Ultimately, Beach and his ex-wife had at least 25 restaurants in the Beachcomber chain. Bergeron and his Trader Vic's had even more, beginning with his first franchise in Seattle (the Outrigger) in 1949 and going on to have locations all over the world. Steven Crane's franchise also expanded, and "mom and pop" tiki bars flourished in the 1950s well into the 1960s across the country in various forms of shapes and sizes.

Over the 1950s, Polynesian design began to infuse many aspects of the country's visual aesthetic, from home accessories to architecture. The Trader Vic's in Palo Alto eventually even spawned architectural choices, such as the concept behind the odd-looking Tiki Inn Motel, which still exists as the Stanford Terrace Inn. Single family homes, apartment complexes, bowling alleys and other business were heavily influenced by assumed Polynesian aesthetics, in some cases incorporating the motif into entire residential areas and shopping districts. Much of it was accomplished by purchasing material from the company Oceanic Arts, which opened in 1956 by both importing materials and doing original wood carvings in California.

Following Hawai'i statehood in 1959, the 1960s saw a popular trend among surfers, especially in California, of wearing tiki god necklaces, adopting tiki 'mascots' to protect their surfing spots, and wearing Hawaiian shirts. Like surfing itself, the imagery was adopted by the youth culture of the time. The surfers in Gidget Goes Hawaiian (1961) wore tiki carvings as pendants, and followed a leader known as the Big Kahuna.

In 1963, Disneyland opened the Walt Disney's Enchanted Tiki Room attraction, featuring Polynesian-style decor, fashion, and music. In 1971, a similar attraction was opened in Walt Disney World as well as a hotel resort of the same theme.

== Drinks ==
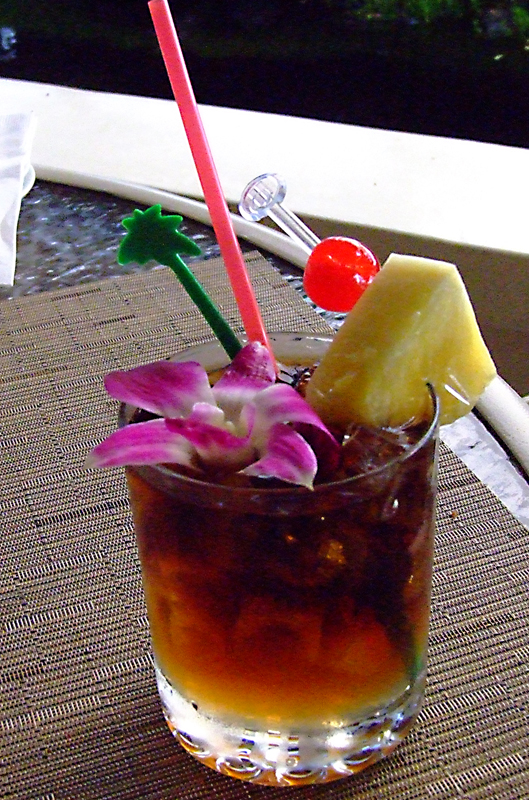
A Mai Tai, the quintessential tiki cocktail

=== Elaborate cocktails ===
If Tiki culture began as a restaurant theme made to look like a Hollywood set, alcoholic drinks dressed up in elaborate barware are its cornerstones and main actors. Just as the Don the Beachcomber restaurant is largely credited as being the first "tiki bar" from which all other such establishments "liberally borrowed", Beach himself is also credited as having almost single-handedly created the entire "tiki drink" genre. He was the first restaurateur to focus an entire drink menu on the mixing of flavored syrups and fresh fruit juices with rum, which he called "Rhum Rhapsodies" and were served in fancy glasses, hollowed out pineapples, and drilled coconuts. A social extrovert good at gaining attention, Beach's early success was noted by tiki historian Jeff Berry, who said that "Donn was good with names, good with drinks, and good with drink names".

These "exotic" drinks, such as his first, the Sumatra Kula, quickly made Beach's restaurant the hot spot for the elite and movie stars from the 1940s well into the 1960s. Howard Hughes was a regular at the Hollywood Don the Beachcomber, as were Charlie Chaplin and Frank Sinatra. Over time many restaurateurs had begun to copy, and in some cases steal, Beach's cocktail recipes and template for immersive island decorations coupled with "newly discovered" Southeast Asian/Polynesian food (rumaki, crab rangoon, etc.). Many eventually created their own signature drink and food dishes, but Beach remains regarded as the originator and is credited for having invented many of the most memorable drinks such as the cobra's fang, pearl diver, pi yi, shark's tooth, test pilot, and zombie. Many drink names were meant to sound as having a foreign origin or being tongue in cheek dangerous.

Bergeron was viewed as a Beach contemporary with his founding of Trader Vic's, and although Bergeron had started by copying the "tiki template" that Beach had created he eventually provided significant additions to the tiki canon. He also ultimately had longer staying power than Beach and over time created nearly as many additional cocktails. He is especially known for creating the Fog Cutter cocktail and Scorpion bowl, as well as the quintessential Mai Tai. Many were strong drinks and noted on menus as having a "limit of two" per person.

A protracted feud between Beach and Bergeron erupted when both claimed to have invented the Mai Tai, which Beach said was a knock-off of his Q.B. Cooler. Bergeron eventually won the exclusive rights to distribute a commercial Mai Tai mix for people to use at home.

Some drinks served at tiki bars include co-opting previous cocktails with exotic sounding names or foreign backstories, such as the Bloody Nelson, Blow My Skull, Boomerang, Corpse Reviver, Diki-Diki, Doctor Funk, Planter's Punch, and Singapore Sling. New inventions by Beach, Bergeron, and others included the Coffee Grog, Navy Grog, Lapu Lapu, Outrigger, Pago Pago, Rum Barrel, Shrunken Head, and Tropical Itch. While many were created expressly as "tiki drinks" (although such a term was not used at the time), others were simply new World War II era cocktails made overseas that could quickly be assimilated into the formula, such as the case with the Suffering Bastard.

Beach was very secretive with his drink recipe ingredients, with only a select few of his bartenders knowing them. Some drinks Beach would only make himself, and he frequently placed alcohol into generic bottles labeled with only letters or numbers, or premixed "secret" ingredients in a similar fashion so that employees only needed to "mix X, Y, & Z with lime juice" to make a certain drink.

Bergeron was less secretive with his ingredients over time, releasing two drink guides that carried his recipes, one in 1947 and the other in 1972. Despite this, many original cocktail recipes were lost to time, either because the recipes themselves were altered to reflect changing tastes (or restaurant budgets), or simply because memories faded and people died. The disagreement between Beach and Bergeron over who created the Mai Tai was not an isolated incident, and who "invented" what drink and when was frequently obscured by establishments that served cocktails with the same name but in sometimes remarkably different manners.

=== Mugs and other vessels ===
Tiki drinks, as they are generically called, are typically heavily garnished, with ample fruit, swizzle sticks, cocktail umbrellas, or flowers. Establishments that were part of or influenced by tiki culture also eventually served at least some of their cocktails in decorative ceramic mugs, which came to be known in the 1950s as tiki mugs because the barware started to bear the shape of a tiki or "faux tiki" approximation. Styles and sizes vary widely, and are generically referred to as tiki mugs even if they are in the shape of a skull, hula girl, or other motif. The cocktails may also be served in hollowed out pineapples, or in large communal drink bowls with long straws that are meant to be shared. Some are set on fire with overproof rum for additional theatrics and flair.

Many restaurants offer a signature drink in a tiki mug that the customer is able to take home or purchase. Both Beach and Bergeron offered in-restaurant "stores" where people could buy not only mugs but drink mixes and other kitsch items. Some mugs were simply stolen and brought home by diners. This led to a large number of 20th-century tiki mugs surviving as souvenirs. Vintage tiki mugs are highly prized finds and are considered to be as much of a symbol of the tiki culture as a tiki itself.

== Fashion ==
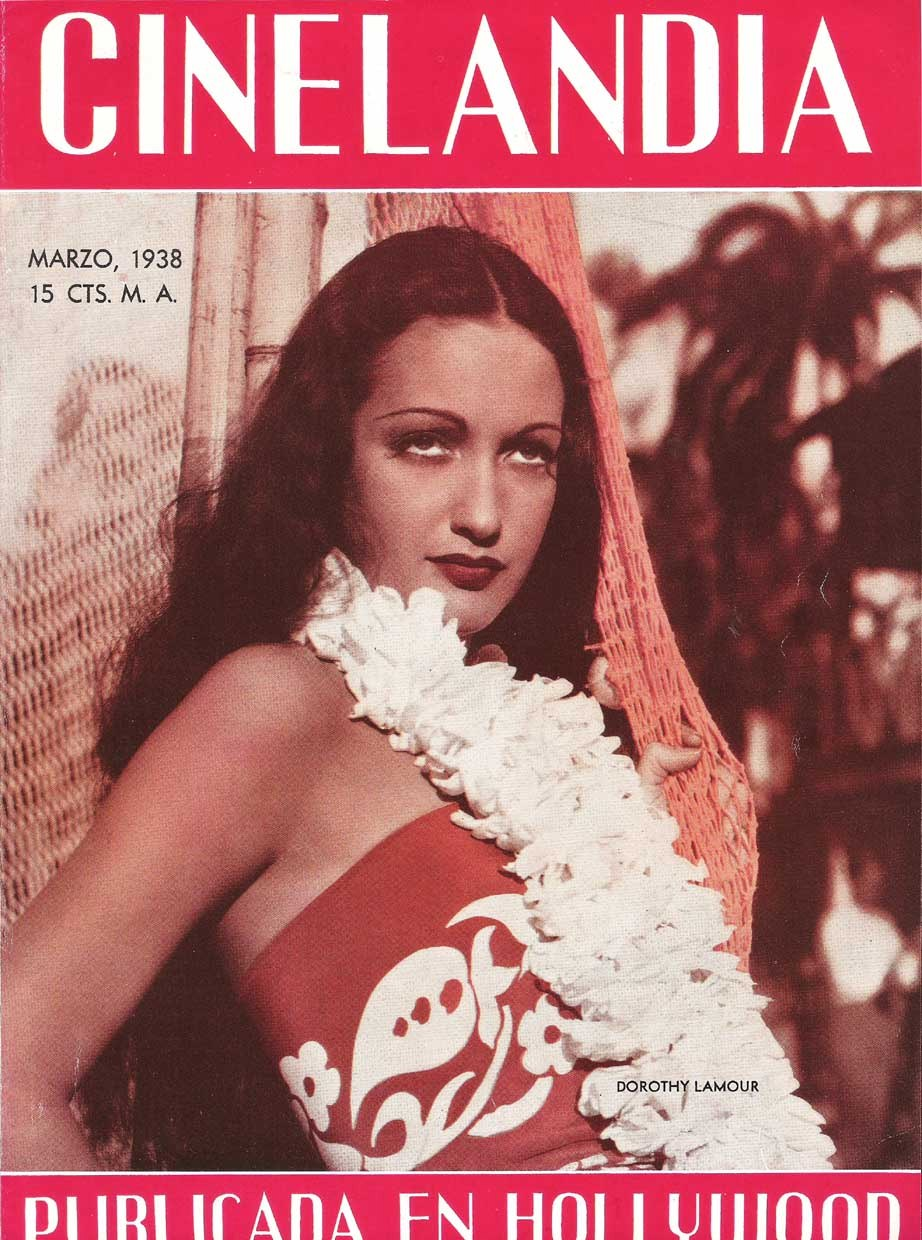
Dorothy Lamour, Cinelandia (1938)

The so-called burgeoning "tiki culture" influenced the clothing choices of mainstream Americans. This held true for both general wear and over time included how to get "dressed up" for going out to get a few drinks and fitting in with the exotic ambience of tiki restaurants.

Sarong inspired dresses became more popular with women, and were also associated with actresses and pin-up models used in tourism advertising such as Dorothy Lamour (known as both the "Sarong Girl" and the "Sarong Queen" from her role in the 1937 film The Hurricane). Other movies such as Abbott and Costello's Pardon My Sarong, as well as Song of the Sarong and Sarong Girl were later released over the course of the 1940s, and served to self reinforce the popularity of Beach's and Bergeron's tropical escape restaurant motifs during this time.

An increasing emphasis on idealized "wahine" (island women) saw their depiction grow from menu cover placement to their use on tiki barware. The Fog Cutter mug and the Kava Bowl were two of the earliest ceramic tiki drinking vessels bearing the images of such women to be used in Trader Vic's restaurants. The Pago Pago Lounge also created a Sarong cocktail.

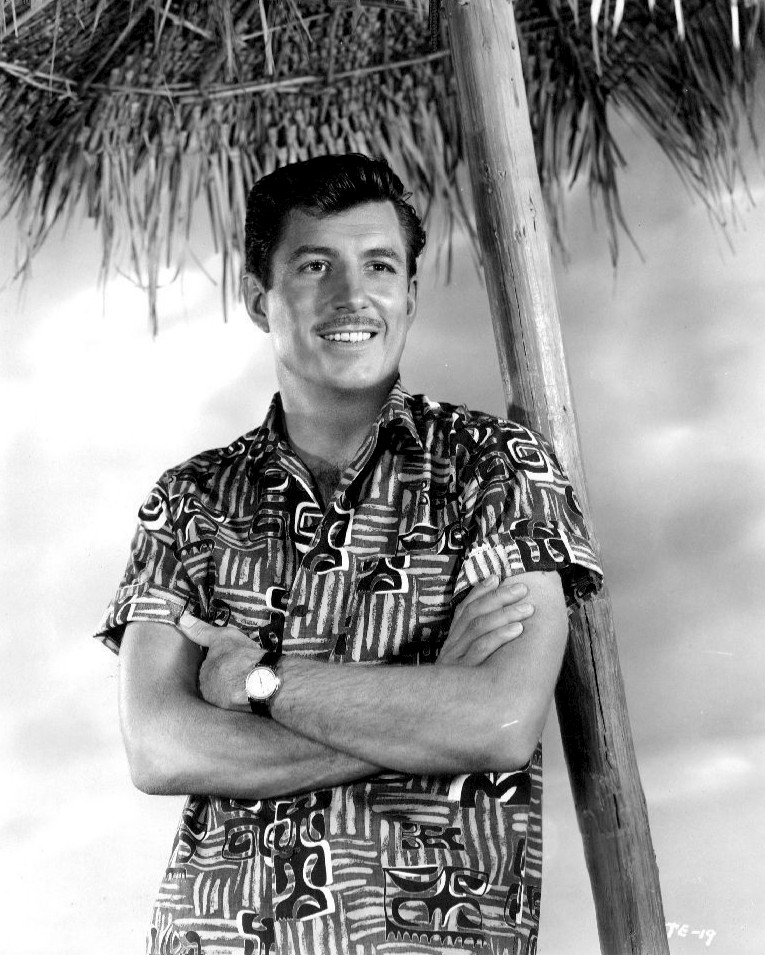
Typical "Hawaiian shirt" worn by Anthony Eisley on Hawaiian Eye in 1961

For men, the "Hawaiian Shirt" would become an enduring symbol of leisure and were increasingly worn in public. US President Harry Truman was famously pictured wearing a Hawaiian shirt on the front cover of Life Magazine's 10 December 1951 issue.

Called "aloha shirts" on the island, the book Aloha Attire: Hawaiian Dress in the Twentieth Century describes how the shirt's history is more than Hawaiian and can be traced to a confluence of cultural influences. As explained by author Linda Bradley, the shirt was actually made with a Western-style silhouette originally inspired by Western sailor shirts, was cut from Japanese kabe crepe fabric (originally used for kimono), was sewn by Japanese and Chinese tailors who immigrated to Hawaii as plantation field workers, and was ultimately worn like a Filipino barong tagalog (always untucked and outside of the pants).

Gardenia, hibiscus, and florals became a more popular fabric pattern in America, as did palm fronds and similar types of tropical plants or animals such as fish and birds. Beyond Polynesia, other more frequently worn patterns included Batik and fabrics from differing Oceanic regions. Leis became worn more frequently outside of Hawaii, not just at Tiki restaurants but also at backyard barbeques and "luau" pool parties.

== Hawaiian statehood ==
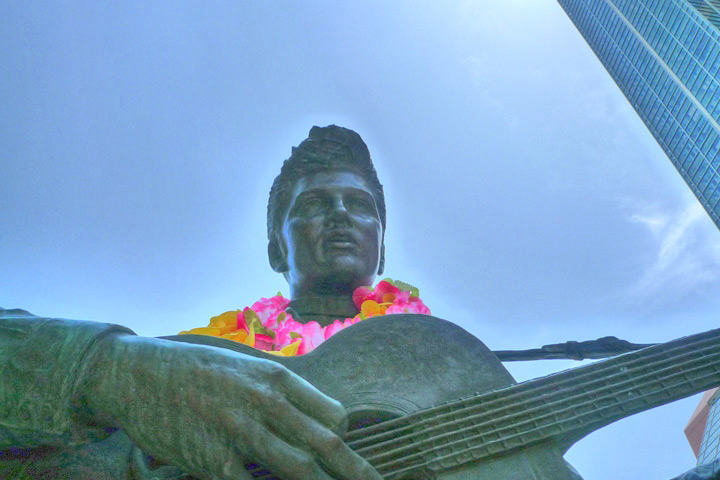
Elvis Presley statue with lei necklace

Official Hawaiian statehood in 1959 became another factor in the popularity of the tropical lifestyle, but also changed how tiki culture was perceived. Hawaii was no longer just a foreign country to the American people, in reality or as imagined, but now a formalized part of their country. Tourism continued ever bigger growth, with the years after statehood becoming a "jet rush" for vacationers snapping up $100 tickets for a now only five-hour flight from Los Angeles or San Francisco without the former restrictions of the former Territory of Hawaii. With statehood making travel easier than ever, for many average Americans for the first time the myth of what Hawaii was and what it was supposed to be came face to face as a booming economy and urbanization began to change the lifestyle of its countryside.

During America's honeymoon with the romanticized version of its newly incorporated state came the 1959 Warner Bros. Television series Hawaiian Eye and the 1961 musical smash-hit Blue Hawaii, featuring pop crooner Elvis Presley playing an Army veteran returning to Hawaii to surf, sing, and marry his girlfriend. It contained many plot elements similar to 1937's Waikiki Wedding, and helped to bring a "Polynesian pop" aspect of tiki to a new generation. This addition came as tiki culture music had begun to split into separate subgenres with the additions of lounge and exotica in the 1950s, which at that point had amended the typical Bing Crosby style of American-Hawaiian music. The popularity of Elvis nevertheless helped to keep broad tiki culture alive, even as adults began to take it into new directions and their children began to meld it into evolving subcultures such as surf.

== Music ==
The impact of tiki culture on music (and vice versa) had beginnings in the creation of "hapa-haole" music, with "haole" meaning "foreigner" in the context, derived from America's expectation of native Hawaiian (and other Oceanic regions) folk music. As is the case with much of tiki culture, its genres can fall into varying themes. Hapa-Haole was more prominent in Beach's and Bergeron's early days during the 1930s and 1940s, and was more traditional and "poppish". Later genres, such as exotica and lounge are more associated with mood music meant to play-off the "mysteriousness" and faux-danger of tiki. It could include high energy drumming or slower and enchanting melodic rhythms. It was frequently instrumental, serving as the "soundtrack" for tropical excursions. Exotica and lounge were more prominent in the 1950s and later, although new variations of hapa-haole would also continue.

=== Hapa-haole ===
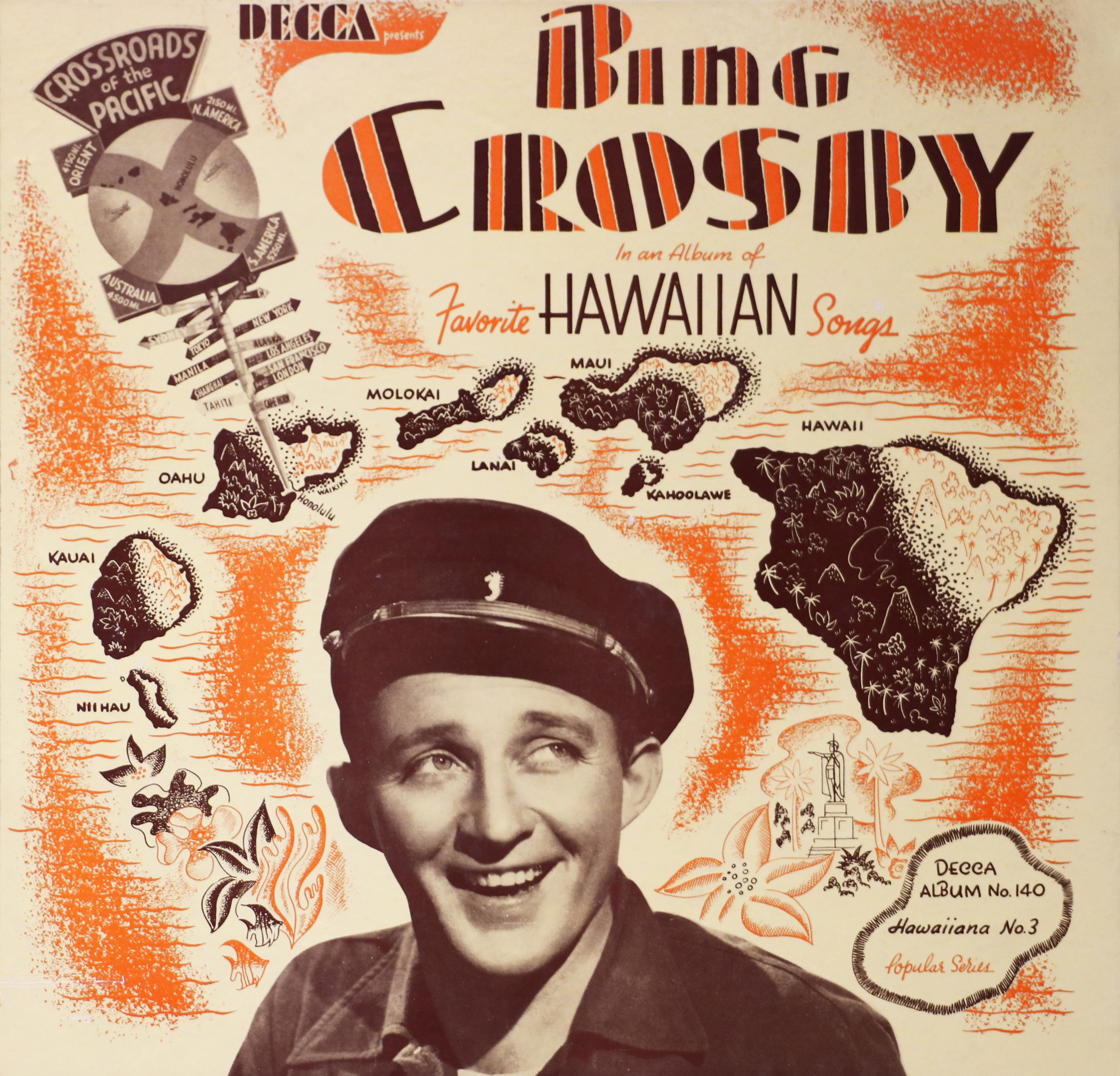
Favorite Hawaiian Songs (1940)

Traditional Hawaiian melodies, sometimes called "Hula Music" at the time by mainstream Americans, initially became prominent in piano sheet music and also created a dancing fad and obsession with Hula girls swaying to the music of strummed ukuleles.

Hapa-haole is the more proper name for what most 20th century Americans would think of as sung Hawaiian music, where the tune, styling, and subject matter have very distinct Hawaiian elements, but the lyrics are mostly in English. It became sung by both Hawaiians and contemporary performers, such as the Bing Crosby vehicles Sweet Leilani and Blue Hawaii in 1937. Alfred Apaka was arguably the foremost interpreter of hapa haole music, melding Hawaiian music with traditional American pop arrangements and English lyrics. Apaka began touring in the late 1930s, and settled more into routine shows at performance rooms created just for him in Hawaii in the 1950s. He would also sing at large luaus being put on by Donn Beach.

Other important singers include Hal Aloma, who had changed his name in response to the 1926 film Aloma of the South Seas, and the legendary Don Ho would follow in the 1960s and 1970s. Music changed with the times with easy listening light instrumentation, with Ho releasing his famous song "Tiny Bubbles", which charted on both the pop (#57 Billboard) and easy listening charts in 1967. Ho also helped bring attention to Marlene Sai, who has been described as a living legend of Hawaiian music.

=== Exotica and lounge ===
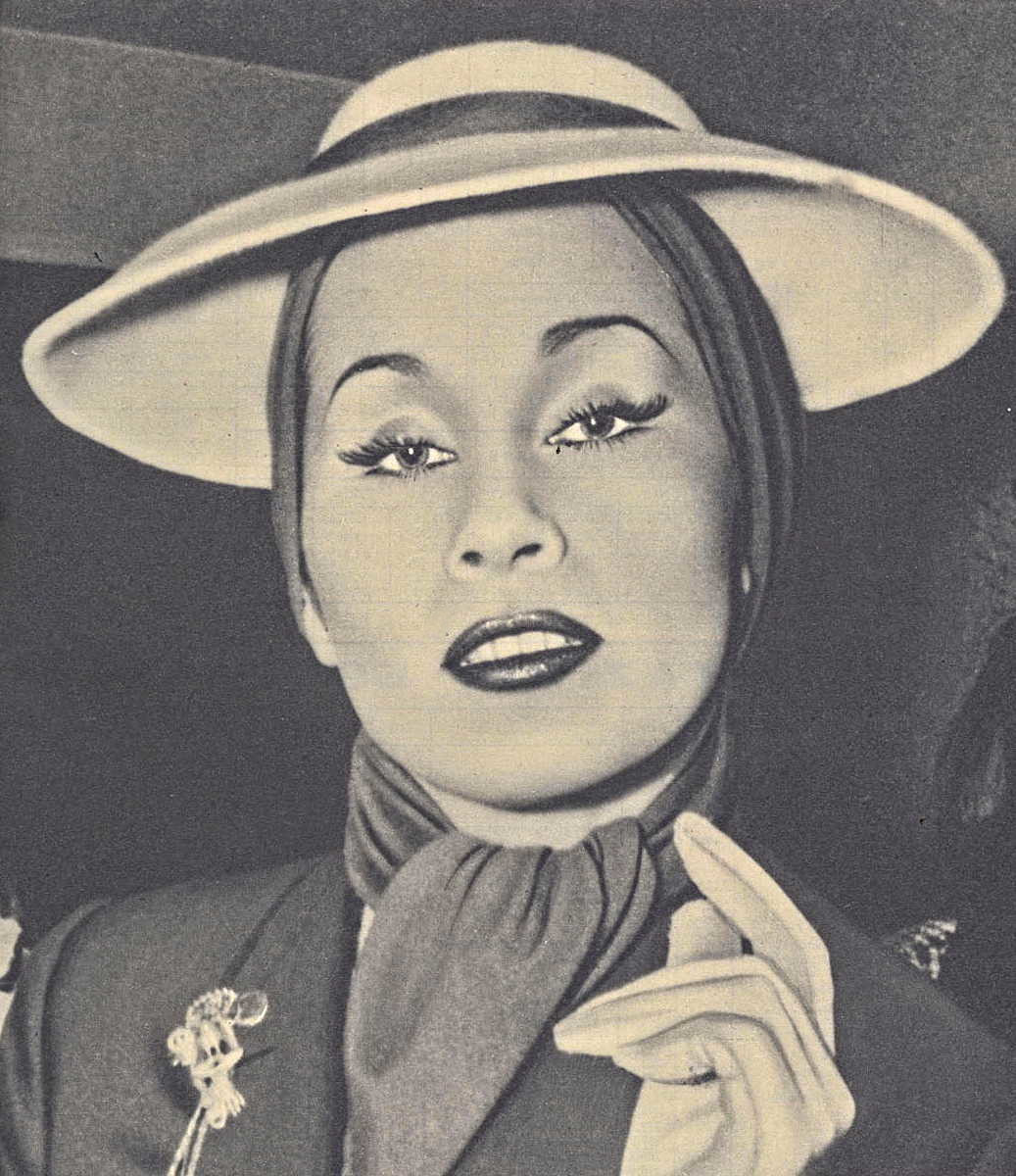
Yma Sumac (1923–2008)

Yma Sumac first appeared on radio in 1942. Born in Peru, she was not Polynesian but she quickly became famous because of her diverse vocal range and in 1946 her home government formally supported her claim to be a descendant of Atahualpa, the last Incan emperor. With enough "exotic" credibility to be packaged as part of tiki culture, especially after Heyerdahl linked tiki to the Andes in 1947, she released albums with names such as Voice of the Xtabay and Legend of the Sun Virgin. These featured tiki-like South American stone carvings and exploding volcanoes on their covers. She also went on to play in minor film roles, such as Secret of the Incas. Voice of the Xtabay was produced and composed by Les Baxter, who had started to experiment with theremin mood music on Music Out of the Moon a few years earlier.

Baxter began to "tikify" this type of mood music. Most lounge and exotica was chiefly instrumental, and largely the integration of exotic escapism into American Jazz. Other early pioneers included Arthur Lyman and Martin Denny, who played live at Don the Beachcomber and other venues. The new theme was blended through jazz stylings augmented with Polynesian, Southeast Asian, and Latin instruments. The music also incorporated elements of Afro-Cuban rhythms, unusual instrumentations, environmental sounds, and the lush romantic themes of Hollywood.

Sandra Warner was showcased on the album cover for Exotica, helping it to reach no.1 on the Billboard charts and eventually giving the entire genre its name. She appeared on the first 12 Martin Denny album covers, 16 overall, and became a lasting iconic association with both the genre and tiki culture. Other important albums in the genre included Jewels of the Sea, Ritual of the Savage, and Forbidden Island, matched with similarly evocative covers.

There are two primary strains of this kind of exotica: jungle exotica and tiki exotica. Jungle exotica was a Hollywood creation, with its roots in Tarzan movies (and further back to William Henry Hudson's novel Green Mansions). Les Baxter was the king of jungle exotica. Tiki exotica on the other hand was introduced in Martin Denny's Waikiki nightclub jungle noises arrangement in Baxter's song "Quiet Village".

Robert Drasnin and Korla Pandit were other important artists in the genre. Just as Bergeron and others in tiki culture had done before him, Pandit invented a new persona (he was born John Roland Redd) by claiming to be a French-Indian musician from New Delhi when he was in fact born in the United States and would be considered by some to be African-American.

== Television ==
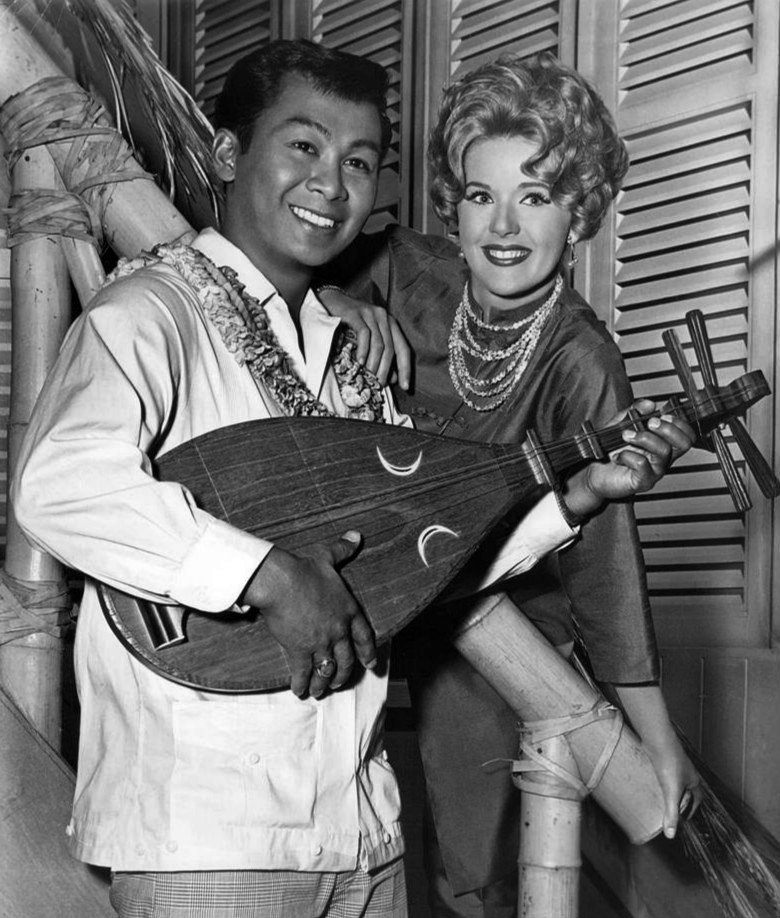
Hawaiian Eye (1959–1963)

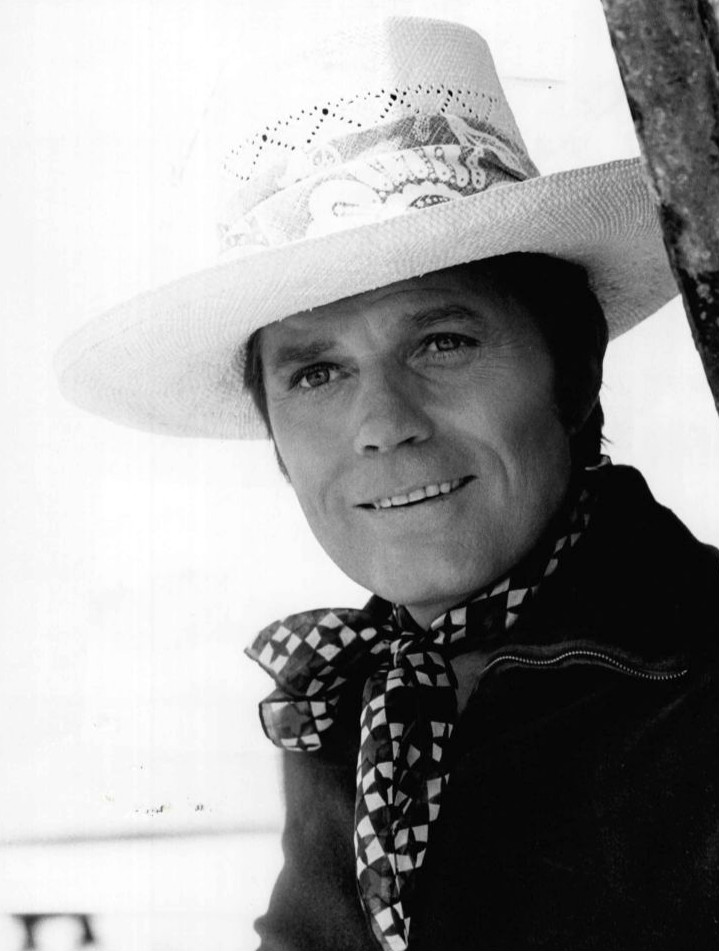
Jack Lord of Hawaii Five-O

=== First wave (1933–1980) ===
James A. Michener brought the adventure TV show Adventures in Paradise (which was broadcast from 1959 to 1962) to American airwaves. It was loosely based on his novel of the same name, featuring the schooner Tiki III with the adventures of the crew and passengers as it sailed around the south Pacific ocean.

The TV detective show Hawaiian Eye (1959–1963) prominently featured a tiki during its credits, and although shot mostly in California it helped to promote the island while spinning off tiki motific comic books and games. Harry Yee is generally attributed with inventing a Hawaiian Eye cocktail named after the show. A Hawaiian Eye tiki mug was made as well.

Hawaiian politician turned actor Tiki Santos (born Abraham De Los Santos) was a recurring minor role character on Hawaiian Eye and went on to make appearances in other shows such as the sitcom McHale's Navy (1962–1966). He played the role of Chief Watara in episodes such as "The Dart Gun Wedding", sitting in a large wicker "throne" behind a large tiki mask.

As the first tiki wave started to crest towards the end of the 1960s, the original air of mystery and exoticism associated with the tiki motif by Americans began to be replaced by more humorous "curse of the tiki" plot devices as sitcoms gained prominence on television. The visual iconography of TV series Gilligan's Island (1964–1967) borrowed significantly from an assumed tiki culture with huts and furniture resembling a fantasy-Polynesian castaway village. An episode had the cast disturbing the resting place of a vengeful tiki god, and attempting to break the curse by invoking "The Great Watubi". A well-known 1972 episode of The Brady Bunch entitled "The Tiki Caves" involves a magical, taboo idol which the characters believe to be cursed.

Shows like I Dream of Jeannie, Green Acres, Sanford and Son, and The Jeffersons often featured special Hawaiian episodes. Tiki carvings sometimes appeared on the shows, including on Fantasy Island but in increasingly less prominent ways.

The long running Hawaii Five-O series hailed back to Hawaiian Eye, and was one of a few exception to the sitcoms during this time. The crashing of its iconic wave during opening credits ended with its cancellation in 1980, coinciding with the general end of tiki culture's first wave as well.

=== Second wave (1990s–present) ===
The SpongeBob SquarePants franchise, created in 1999 by marine biologist Stephen Hillenburg, heavily relies on Tiki art, patterns, and music. Tiki-themed elements of the show include intertitle paintings; retro Hawaiian and hula production music from APM; borrowing patterns from aloha prints and Polynesian patterns for backgrounds and skies; and character and background designs which reflect Māori religious influences, such as Squidward's dwelling which resembles a religious Tiki head. Showrunner Stephen Hillenburg referred to Squidward's house as an "Easter Island head" despite the design differences.

== Decline ==
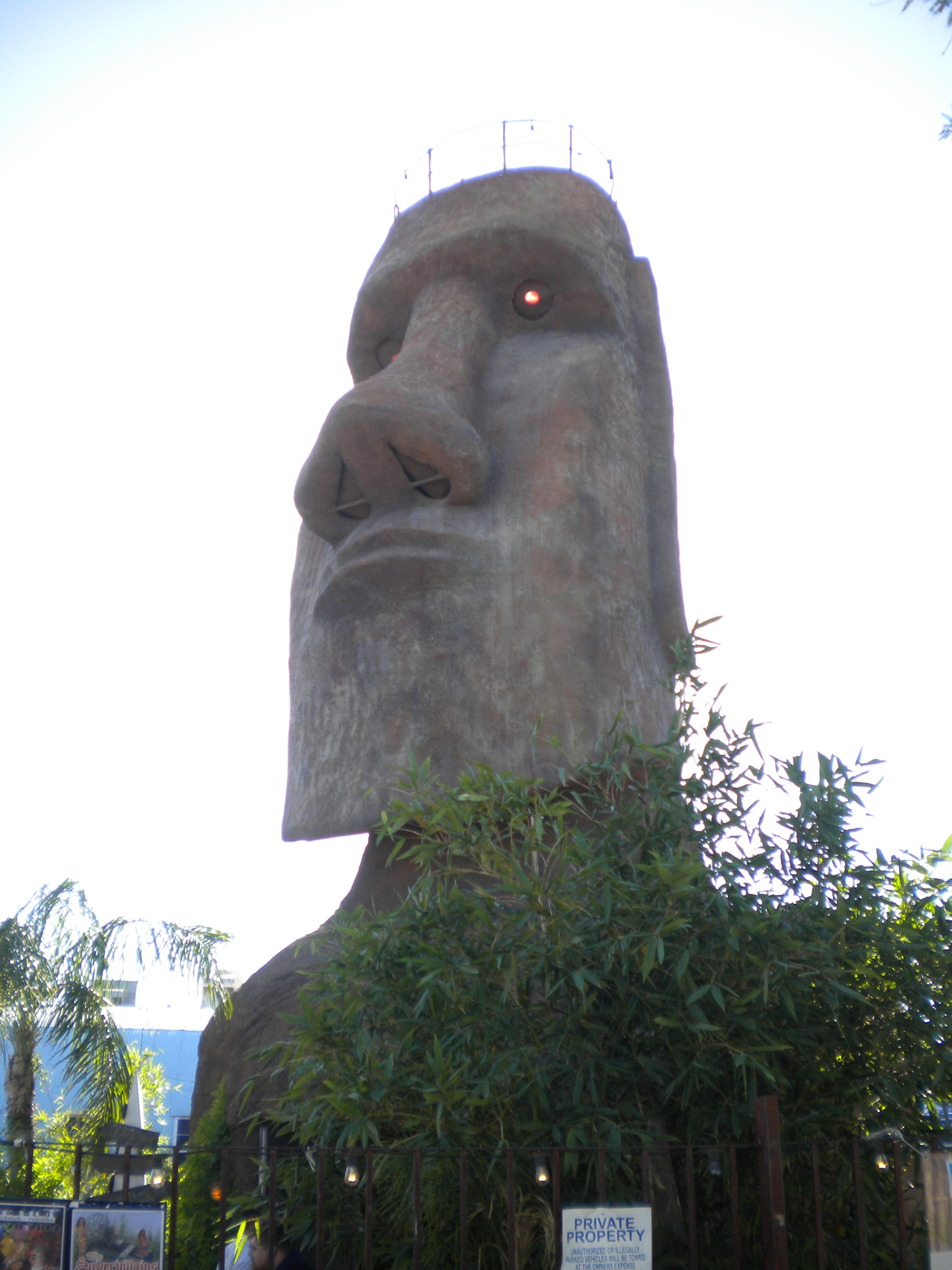
Replica of a Moai (Easter Island head) from a mini-golf course in Tucson, Arizona, that closed in 2007

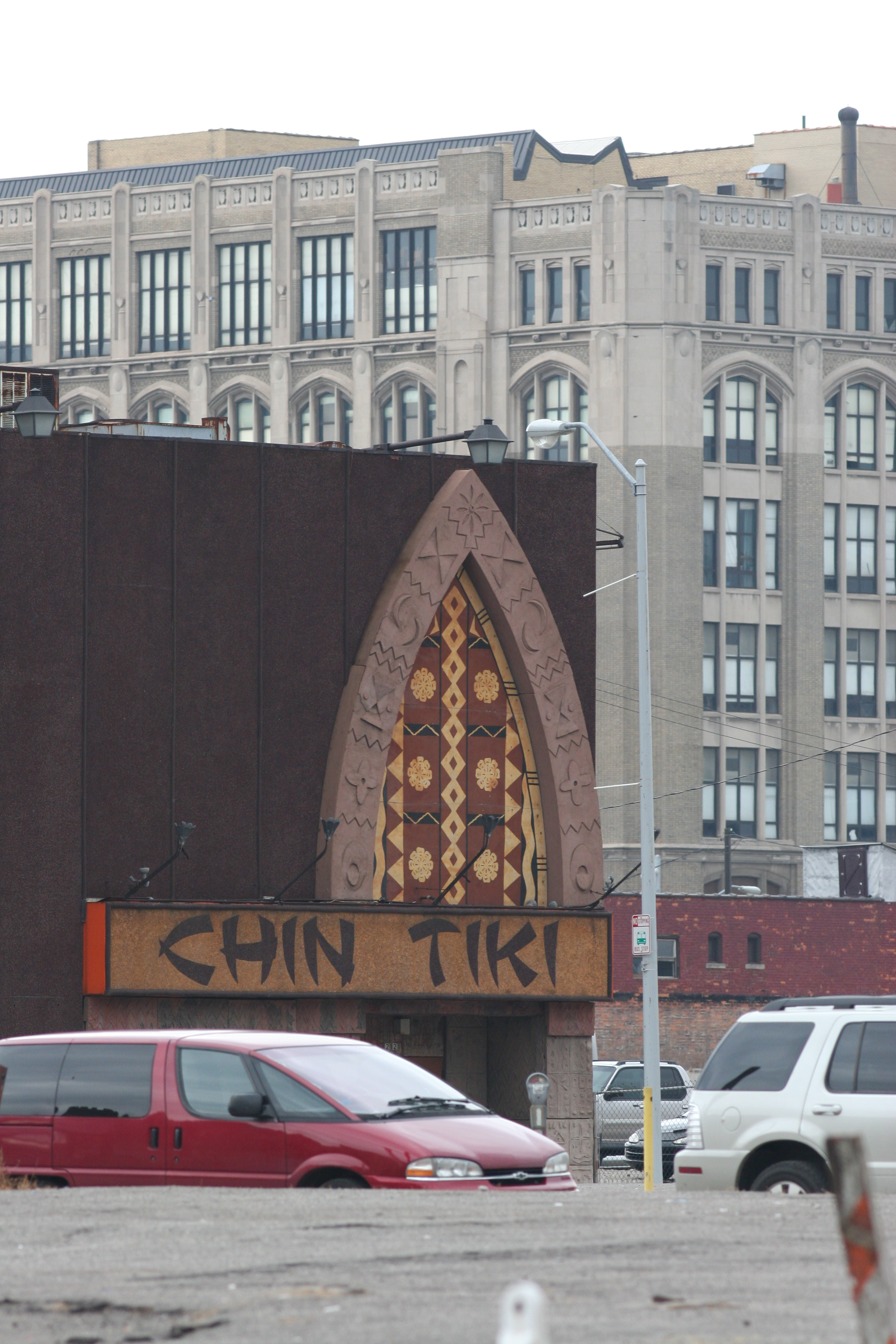
Shuttered Chin-tiki restaurant in Michigan (2006)

Towards the latter part of the 1970s, "tiki restaurants" were well past the apex of their popularity and many started to close. This was true for both many independent tiki bars as well as what had grown into the major chains associated with hotels such as Vic's Outrigger and the Sheraton's Kon-Tiki. The majority of independent tiki bars like the Pago Pago Lounge were demolished or shuttered, with only a few such as the Tonga Room, Tiki Ti, and Mai Kai managing to stay afloat. Trader Vic's was the only of the former major chains that was still in large scale operation.

By 1980, most of the tiki aesthetic in architecture and elsewhere had been completely wiped away in the name of progress. Some examples of homes, apartments and restaurant buildings remained, almost exclusively on the west coast. Of those, only a small handful still featured carved tikis. In 1989, Donald Trump closed the Trader Vic's bar in The Plaza, calling it "tacky" and that it "does not fit in with the image of the hotel that I want to achieve".

The allure of escapism and tropical drinks for the average American still remained, but was eclipsed by Jimmy Buffett and Parrotheads seeking the closer to home "Margaritaville" instead of tikis further away Bali-Hai islands as their preferred Shangri-La for relaxing and drinking.

Tiki restaurants and bars had been vital through much of the 1930s into the 1970s, what Jeff Berry called an unprecedented lifespan for a [themed] drink fad. The Chin Tiki, which had been permanently closed in 1980 and falling into disrepair, was finally torn down in Detroit near the turn of the century, just as tiki was beginning to stir once again on America's west coast.

== Partial revival ==
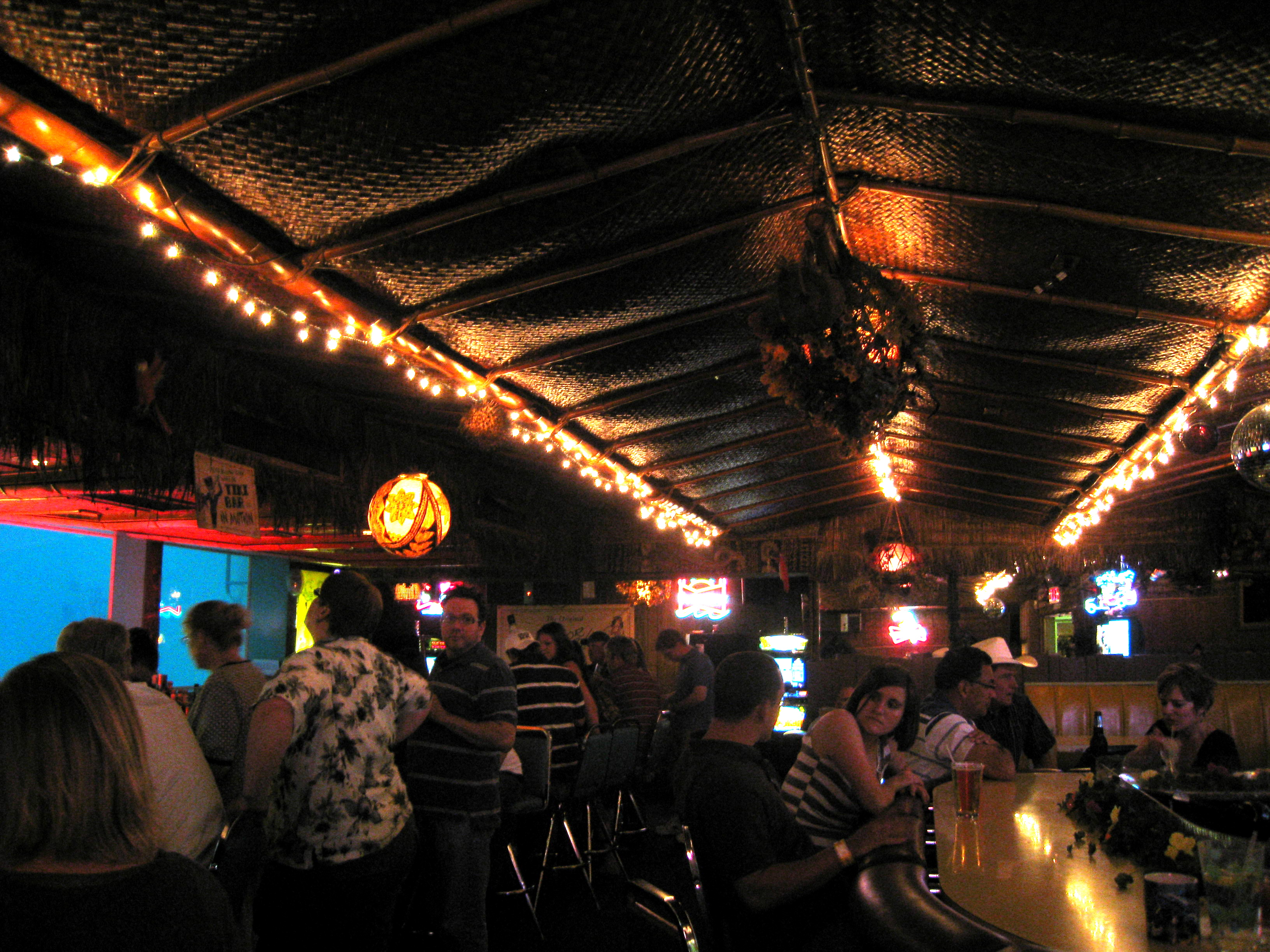
Patrons at the Sip'n Dip Lounge

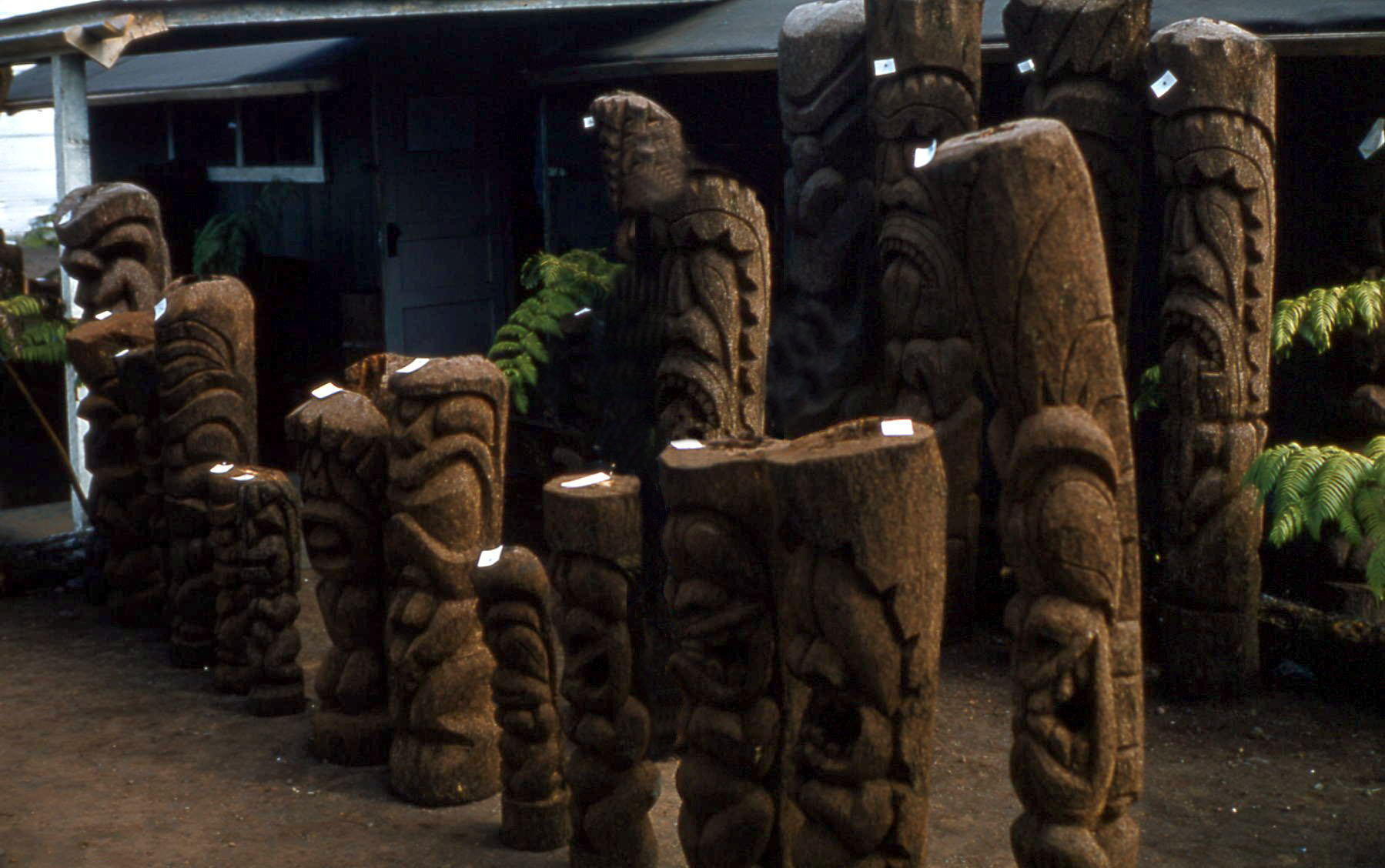
Decorative wood tiki carvings

The later 1990s saw the start of a renewed larger scale interest in tiki from a variety of sources, the main being simply based on the curiosity of a new generation whose Woodstock parents had rejected tiki as old and "square", but for their children was something new to be appropriated and repurposed. This began with people like Bosko Hrnjak, who had been raised in California's San Gabriel valley among its tiki inspired architecture and who in the mid-1990s began to carve large palm logs into tikis for his home bar. He became an influential artist known for his burnt wood carving style and making of homemade tiki mugs, an early catalyst for getting tiki's revival off the ground. Another early artist of the revival period was Tiki King from the Santa Cruz mountains. He was inspired by his artistic parents and a large tiki given to his family by his surfer uncle. He became known for carving tiki necklaces and starting a mail order tiki business in the early 1990s.

Also towards the end of the century saw a renewed interest in trying to "authentically" recreate older drinks. Jeff "Beachbum" Berry released several drink books starting in 1998 (the Grog Log, Intoxica, and others) that contained researched recipes for many of the signature drinks from the sometimes shuttered bars of previous decades. This was also the beginnings of the "urban archeology" aspects of 21st century tiki culture, based on historical interest and fueled by the "puzzle solving" of trying to discover secrets from the past from a cultural theme that was based in part on the "exploration" of tropical regions. Berry's work is considered to be one of the most important contributions to tiki's renaissance.

Soon after also came the influential The Book of Tiki by Sven Kirsten in 2000. Before that, Otto Von Stroheim had been self publishing a 'zine called Tiki News that helped provide critical mass for books like Kirsten's to be made. Berry created two cocktails named after both Kirsten and Stroheim for their early contributions to tiki's resurgence in his historical drink guides.

In 1995 tiki websites began to grow on the internet; in 1995 Exoticon, a convention of tiki art and exotic music, drew over 1500 people in Los Angeles including local celebrities such as Mark Mothersbaugh and Matt Groening.

=== Restaurant and bar resurgence ===
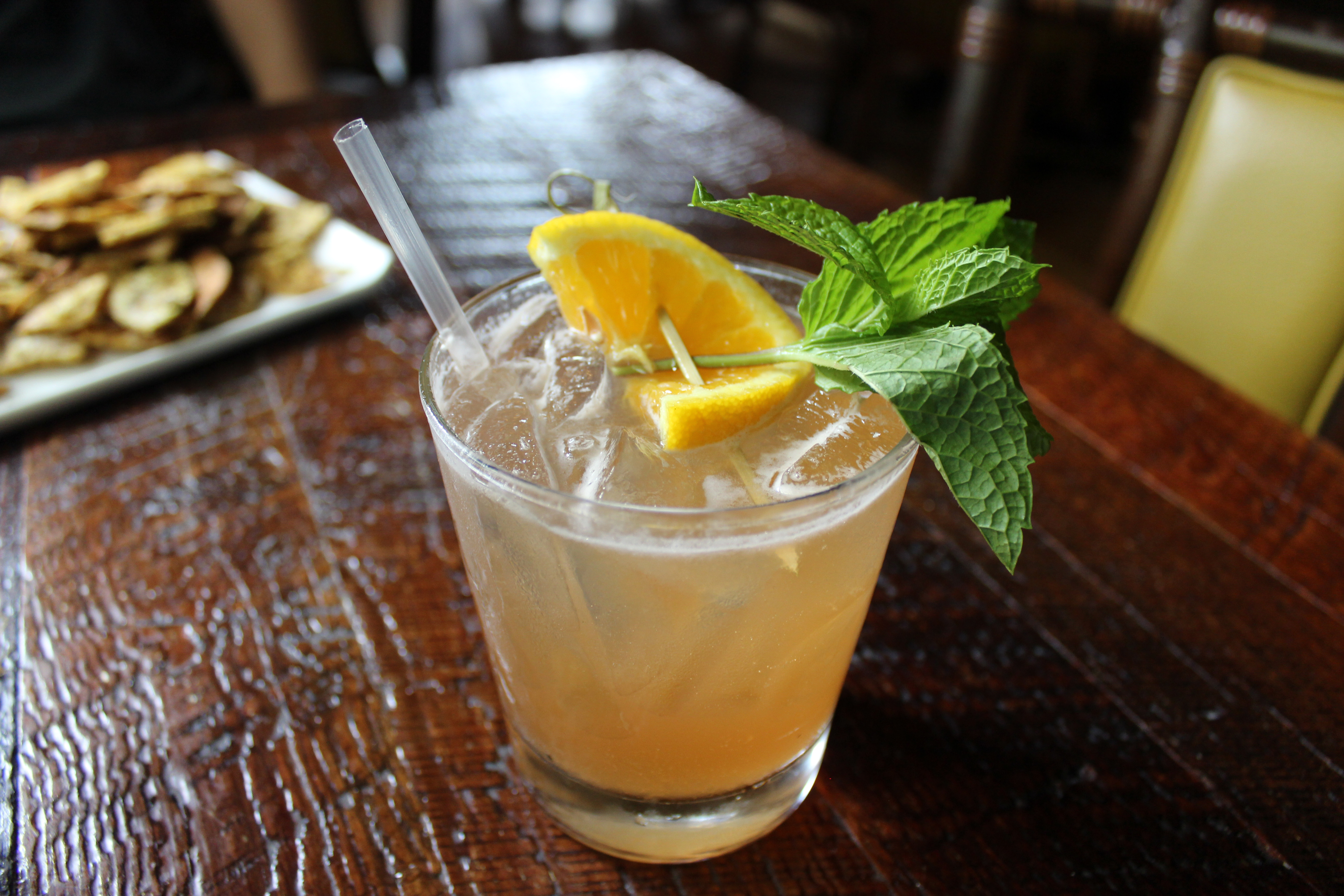
A Suffering Bastard cocktail at Latitude 29 in New Orleans

Many new tiki bars and retro-Polynesian themed restaurants began to open their doors after the turn of the century. Non-themed bars also started placing tiki drinks on their menus, signaling a broader acceptance of the genre while also engendering discussion over what qualified to be called an "authentic" tiki bar.

Interest in tiki had also proliferated overseas, with The Book of Tiki's Sven Kirsten hailing from Germany where a tiki subculture is strong. In 2017 noted tiki historians Sven Kirsten, Jeff Berry, Martin Cate, Brian Miller, and Chris Osburn listed their top 15 operating tiki bars in the world, which included four from London, one from Munich, one from Tokyo, and one from Barcelona.

=== Lowbrow movement ===
In California and elsewhere, the re-exploration of rat rod and Hot rod culture melded with tiki, tattoo history, and rockabilly music to create new cultural hybrids such as "lowbrow" that manifested itself in music, art, and a new breed of tiki bars. Rockabilly artist Brian Setzer released his album The Dirty Boogie in 1998, featuring retro tiki bar images on its cover. Taboo: The Art of Tiki was released in 1999, with artists such as Mark Ryden and Shag also employing tiki imagery in retro eclectic paintings.

WFMU's on-line channel "Sheena's Jungle Room" plays exotica music as part of its mix of "all things Lowbrow".

Psycho Suzi's Motor Lounge opened featuring motifs of tattooed hula girls sporting suicide rolls. It describes itself by saying: "We take lovingly-remembered tiki bar history, a healthy helping of tattoo culture, several measures of kitsch, a dash of voodoo and a passion for good times, stick them all in a blender and hit Liquify". The bar had originally opened in 2003 at a shuttered A&W Drive-In.

The popularity of modern Western tattooing already had its roots in the South Pacific, but a resurgence in tattooing saw popularity with tiki-related tattoos. Sailor Jerry Rum, named after legendary tattoo artist Norman Collins, was introduced and marketed in part to be used in tiki drinks.

Tiki Art Now!: A Volcanic Eruption of Art was published in 2004 with an introduction by Otto Von Stroheim. Art galleries held Tiki Art shows, highlighting the works of artists such as Sunny Buick, Heather Watts, Derek Yaniger, Flounder, and Tiki Tony.

Lowbrow also spawned Tiki Noir, a literary subgenre of hard-boiled crime fiction in a tiki setting, in which the main character is often a world-weary and deeply flawed detective. Ritual of the Savage by Jay Strongman and the comic Hawaiian Dick are two examples.

=== 21st-century cultural events ===
The rise in popularity for traditional tiki drinks also took hold in the craft cocktail movement, as well as within certain "retro culture" circles that were associated with it such as with Hipsters. Switching tiki drinks back to their original fresh juice origins, which had turned towards more artificial syrups during tiki's decline, helped to give the drinks a new reputation. The craft cocktail movement also saw drink experimentation that moved beyond rum and gin, highlighting tiki cocktails that were made with American whiskey and other different base liquor ingredients.

Duke Carter's catalogue of historical tiki mugs, Tiki Quest, was published in 2003. Goodwill stores and thrift shops saw dusty tiki mugs suddenly whisked off their shelves, becoming stock for new home tiki bars and period-authentic sets for Blast from the Past and Mad Men. These bars range from the simple to full-builds which rival their commercial forebears. Modern tiki mug manufacturing in the 21st century also became common and they are frequently purchased on the internet from companies such as Tiki Farm and Munktiki, among others.

The pioneering video podcast Tiki Bar TV started in 2005, highlighting drink recipes such as the Suffering Bastard and the Boomerang while filling tongue in cheek "prescriptions" for modern day maladies with tiki cocktails. It garnered attention from the Apple Corporation.

Tiki Magazine was launched, and large tiki-themed conventions began being held. Annual events include Tiki Oasis in San Diego started in 2001 by Otto and Baby Doe von Stroheim; the Hukilau occurs in Fort Lauderdale, Florida, and was started in 2002 by Tim "Swanky" Glazner and Christie White in association with the Mai-Kai restaurant. In 2005, Robert Drasnin was invited to perform at The Hukilau, his show consisting of selections from his 1959 album Voodoo, as well as new material that would form the basis for the release of Voodoo II almost a half century later in 2007.; Tiki-Kon started as the NW Tiki Crawl in 2003, and takes place in Portland, Oregon. Tiki Caliente in Palm Springs. The Ohana: Luau at the Lake takes place in Lake George, NY at the Tiki Resort hotel. It is put on in conjunction with The Fraternal Order of Moai, a tiki-themed social club formed in Ohio in 2005. Inhuele is hosted in Atlanta, GA every January. The same organizers also produce an Atlanta tiki home-bar crawl.

A remake of Thor Heyerdahl's 1950 documentary was filmed using two languages and turned into a major motion picture in 2012 with the release of Kon-Tiki. The documentary Bosko and the Rebirth of Tiki was released in 2018.

== Critical reception ==
With the 21st century revival has come criticism. Some criticize tiki bars as a seductive form of cultural appropriation which can obscure and subsume native traditions and divert attention from the history of violent colonialism in the region. In 2016, National Public Radio posed the question: Let's talk tiki bars, harmless fun or exploitation?

== Gallery ==
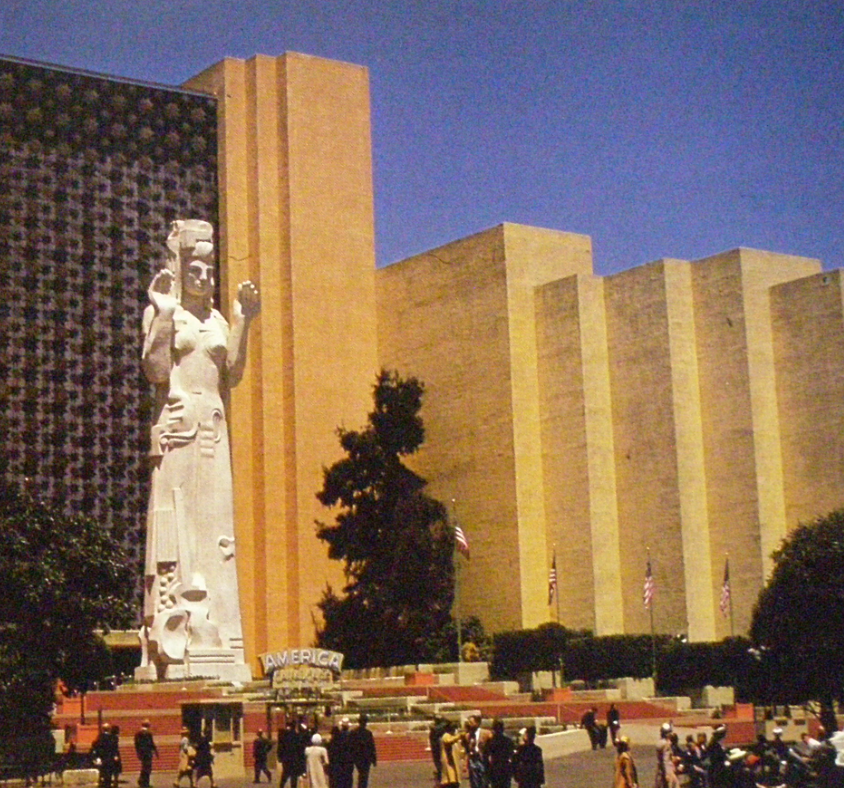
Pacifica at the Golden Gate International Exposition (1936–1937)

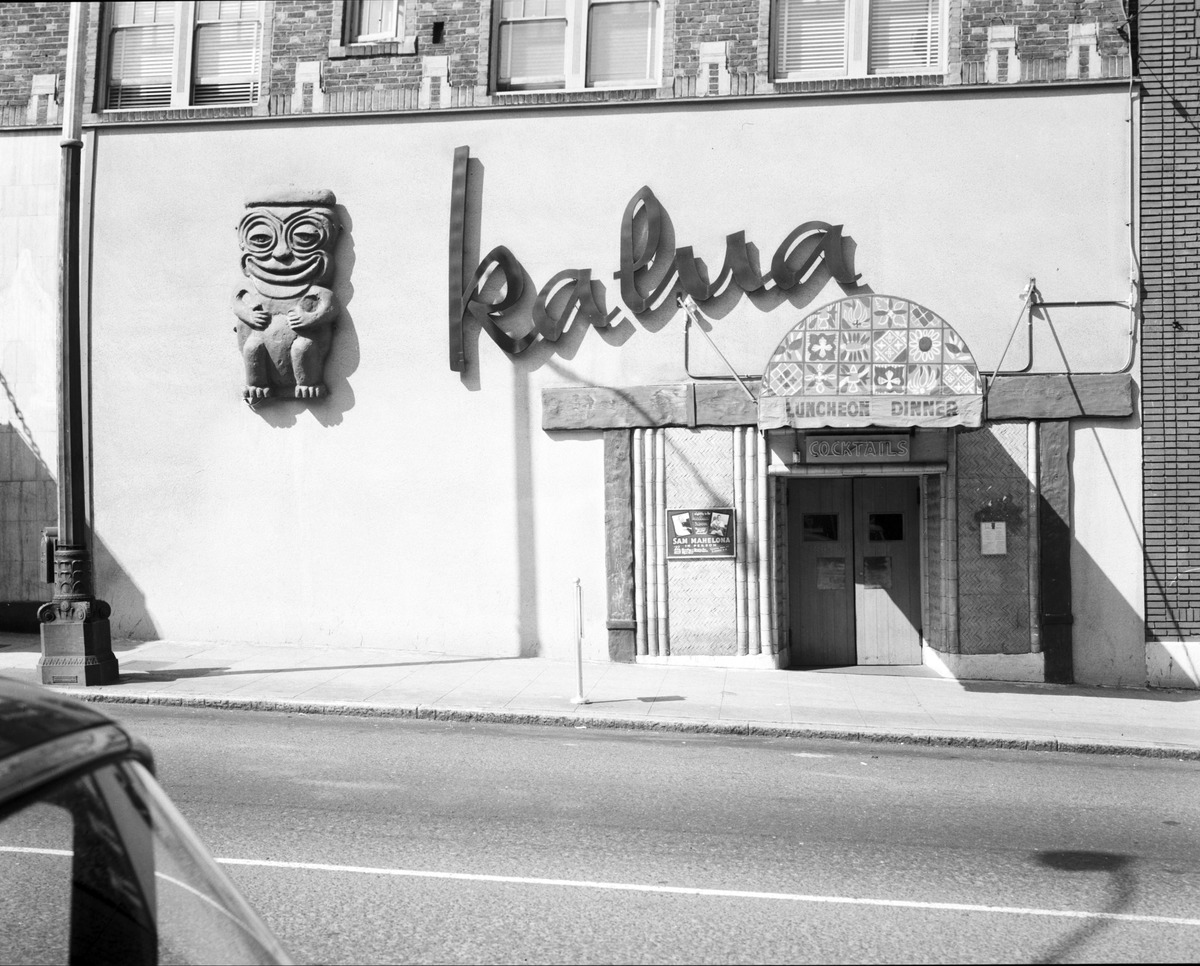
Kalua Restaurant (1953), Seattle, Washington

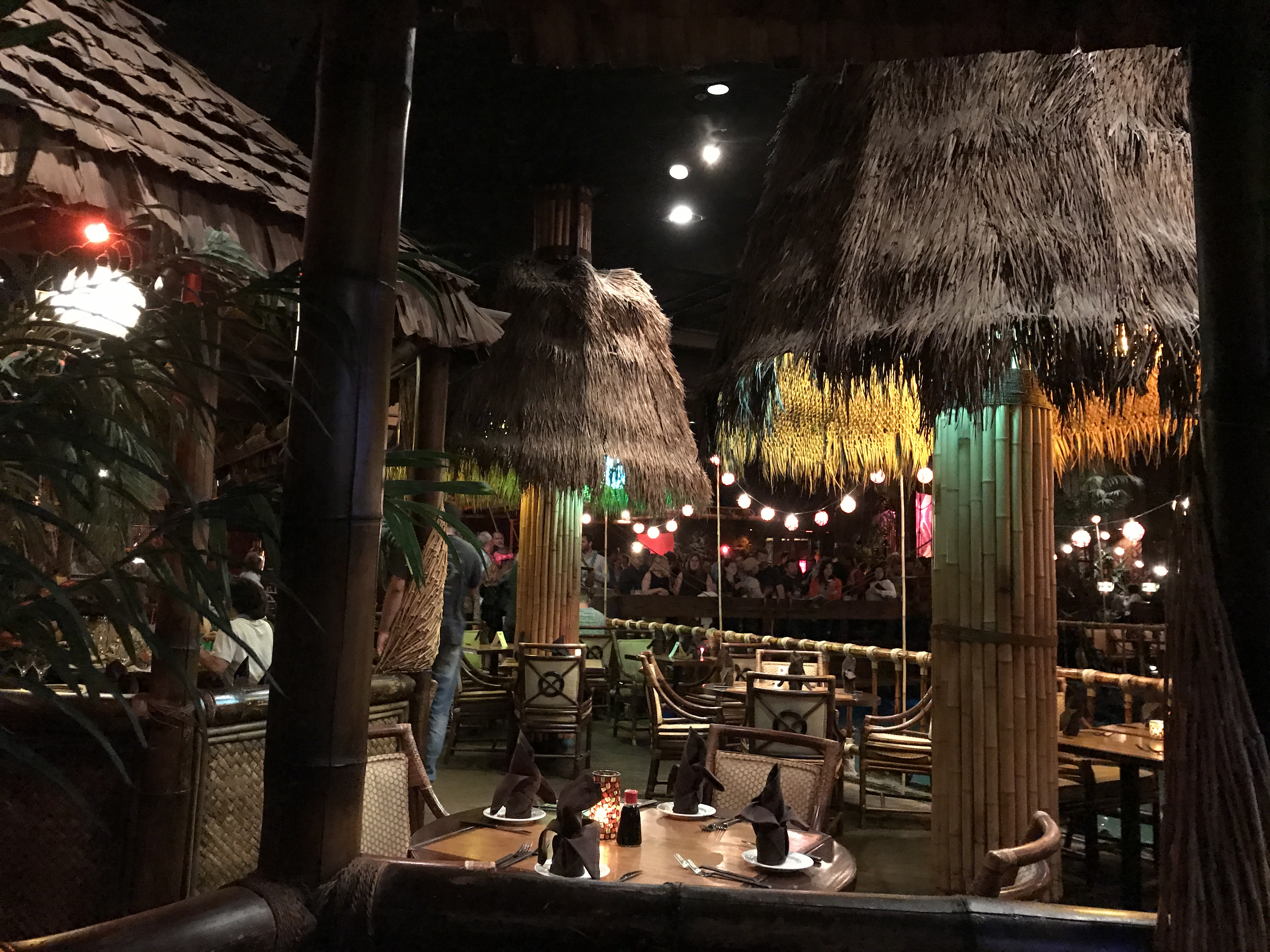
Typical tiki culture restaurant décor, the interior of Tonga Room

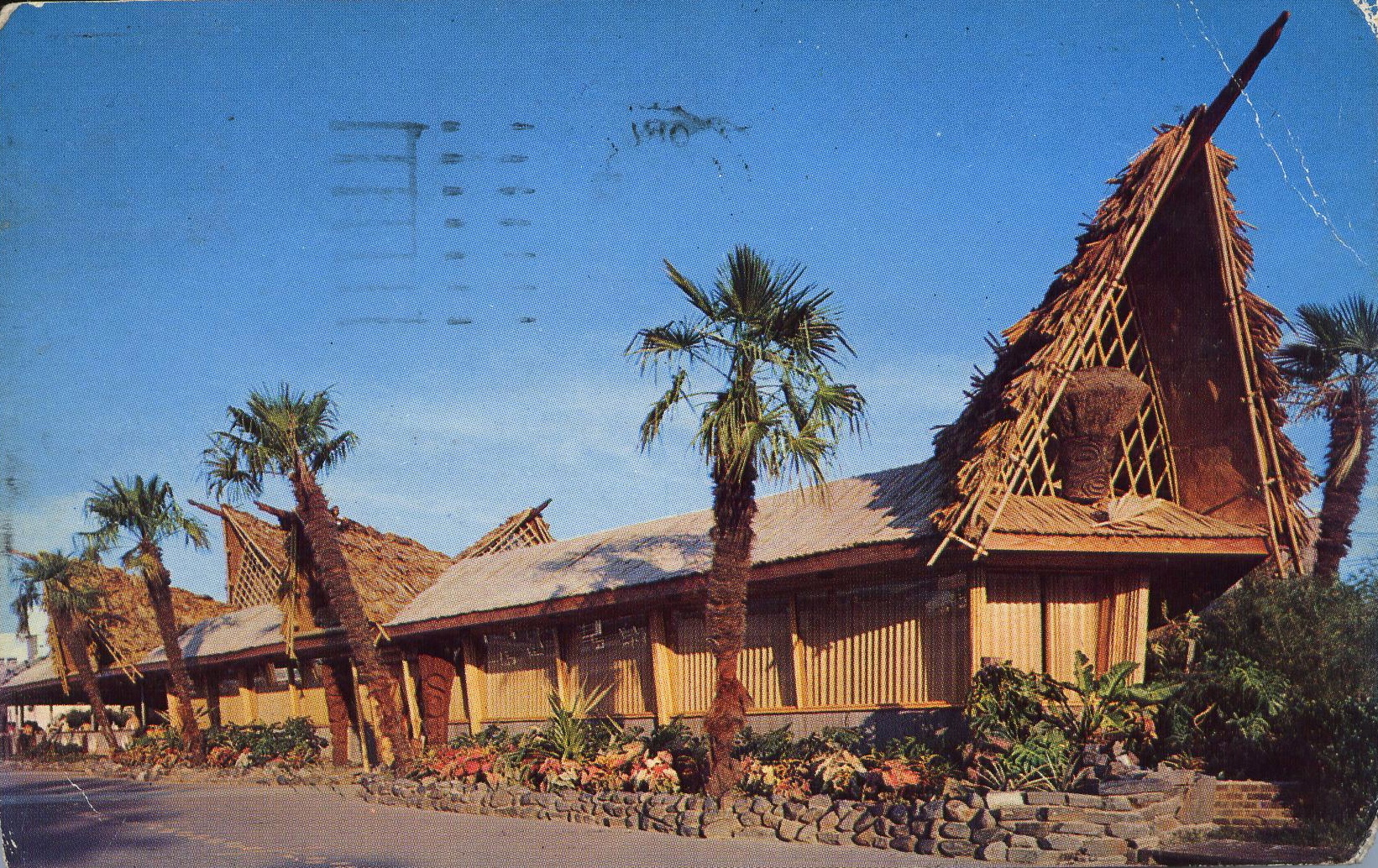
Bali Ha'i Restaurant, New Orleans, 1950s, an example of extreme tiki architecture. Demolished in the 1980s.

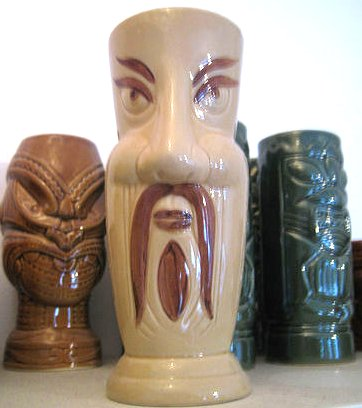
A Fu Manchu mug

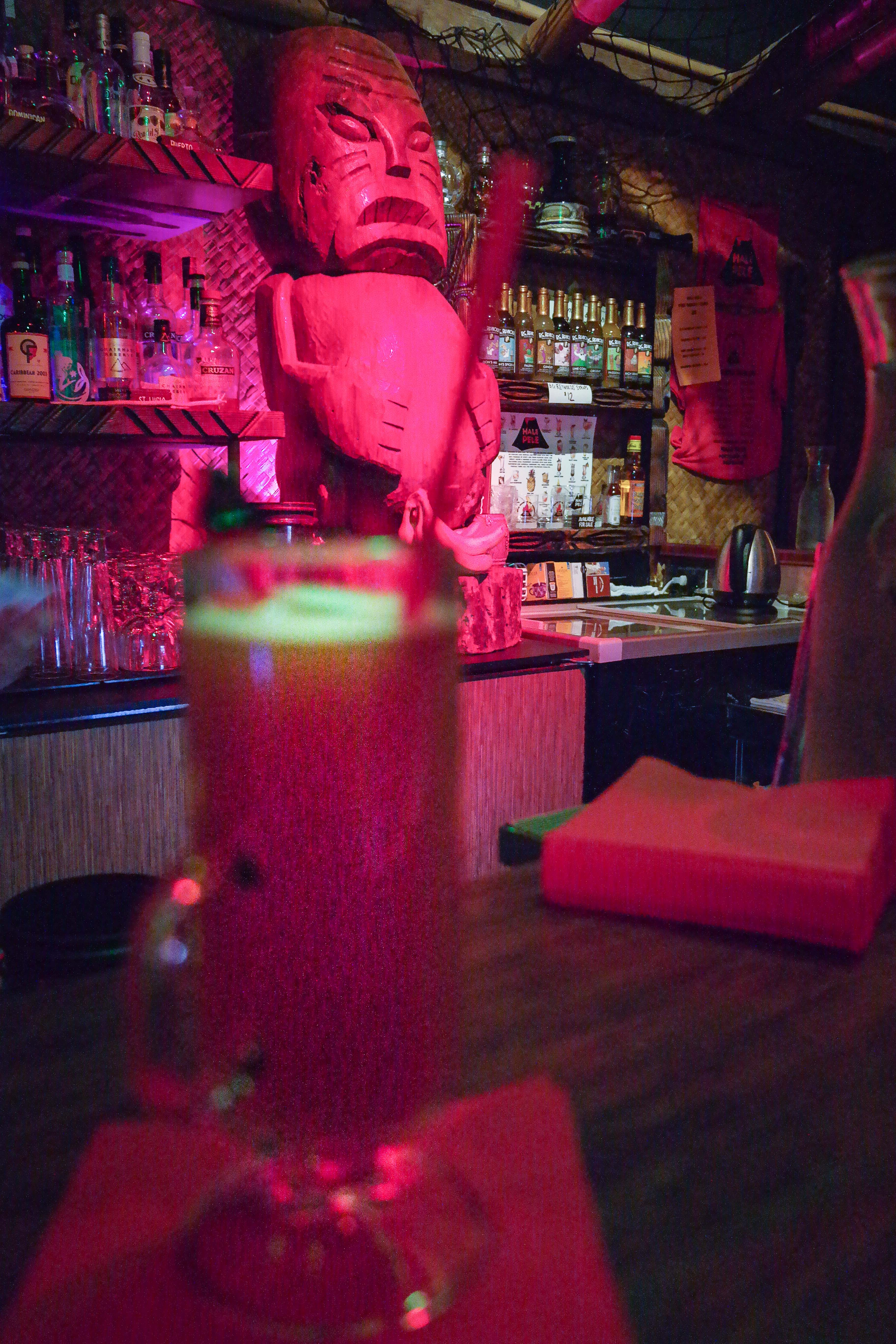
A faux-tiki carving and tiki mug, two hallmarks of tiki culture

== See also ==
- Atomic Cocktails
- Disney's Polynesian Village Resort
- Exoticism
- Kava culture
  - Kava bar
- Lounge music
- Tiki Bar TV
- Douglas Snelling
