= Okolehao =

Hawaiian alcoholic spirit made from the root of the ti plant

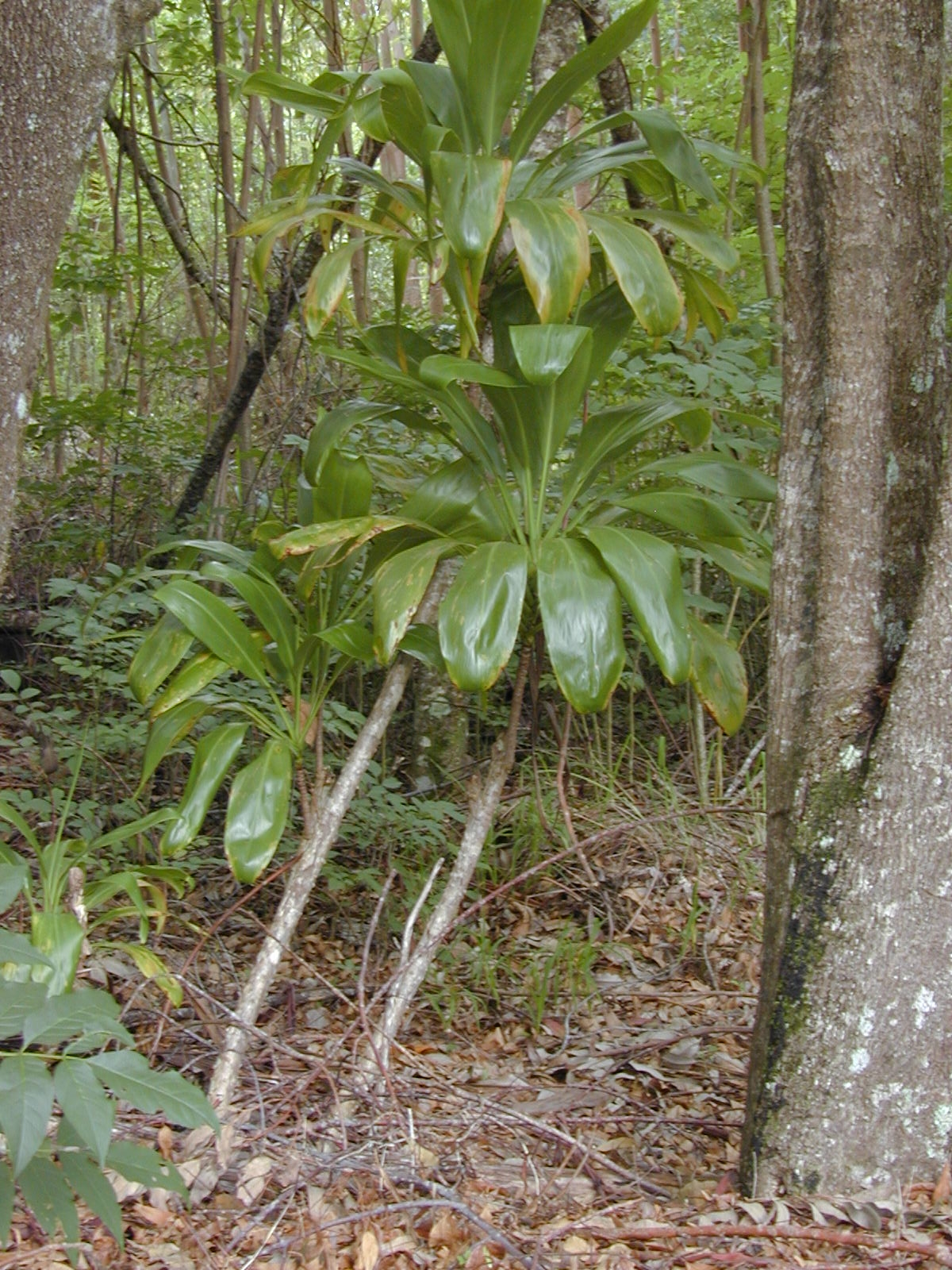
Green ti plants in the Makawao Forest Reserve, Maui

ʻŌkolehao is an alcoholic spirit whose main ingredient was the root of the ti plant. ʻŌkolehao's forerunner was a fermented ti root beverage or beer. When distillation techniques were introduced by an escaped British convict named William Stevenson in the 1790s, it was distilled into a highly alcoholic spirit.

Hawaiians discovered that if the ti root is baked, a sweet liquid migrates to the surface of the root. Chemically, the heat changes the starch in the root to a fermentable sugar. The baked root is then soaked in a vat of water which dissolves the sugar, and fermentation begins. The fermented drink was later distilled into a highly alcoholic spirit which became Hawaii's only indigenous distilled spirit, and was prized by the king, the spirit of Hawaii. The Merrie Monarch, King David Kalakaua, is said to have had his own distiller.

== Etymology ==
The name is from the iron try pots that were brought ashore from sailing ships and converted into stills, and literally meant "iron butt", from Hawaiian ʻōkole ("butt") + hao ("iron").

== History ==
After the initial production of ʻōkolehao in the 1790s, Hawaiians added sugar cane as another fermentable. When pineapple was introduced, this too was sometimes added for its sugar content. When Japanese and Chinese immigrants arrived to work in the sugarcane and pineapple fields they brought with them their native rice. The propagated rice was also sometimes added to the formula. By the beginning of World War II Hawaiians were producing ʻōkolehao of various formulations, all of which were sold to US military personnel located at the many bases in Hawaii. Spirit alcohol made from grains was rationed during the war and used for fuel by the military forces; the resulting shortage was good for ʻōkolehao sales, but encouraged many hastily produced inferior products. When the war was over, the production of ʻōkolehao gradually died out as rum and vodka became readily available and better-tasting than the crude ʻōkolehao then being produced.

Just as moonshine on the mainland was produced using various formulas, ʻōkolehao was produced using various fermentable ingredients such as taro. Aging in used whiskey barrels improved the flavor, though this was rarely done.

While the US Bureau of Alcohol, Tobacco, Firearms and Explosives once recognized ʻōkolehao as a unique class, like vodka, gin, bourbon, tequila, whiskey, liqueur, etc., it is now recognized as a distilled spirits specialty (DSS), which requires the producer or distiller to submit the exact ingredients and general formula to the Alcohol and Tobacco Tax and Trade Bureau (TTB) and include a truthful and adequate statement of composition on the label.

For the short time ʻōkolehao was legally made in Hawaii after the war and into the sixties, the state of Hawaii granted ʻōkolehao a reduced tax rate. That reduced tax was ruled by the US federal government to be illegal due to discriminatory taxation of a spirit product.

== Description ==
"Original", "real" ʻōkolehao taste depends primarily on the formula used, and the fermentation and distillation methods employed. As with all spirits, aging in oak barrels can produce a different flavor profile, but this is rarely done. ʻŌkolehao, like other moonshines from elsewhere, is usually consumed un-aged. Earthy, vegetal, hints of banana or pineapple, indeterminate tropical flavor: these adjectives and more have all been used to describe the original ʻōkolehao taste.

== Cocktails ==
- ʻŌkolehao is used as the main ingredient in the Chief's Calabash and the Lei Day cocktail.
- It is not commonly used in tiki drinks, likely because it was hard to get in California during the early days of Don the Beachcomber. Hawaiian bartender Harry Yee is attributed with inventing the Hot Buttered ʻŌkolehao.
- Recipes listing ʻōkolehao appeared in Trader Vic's drink guides. It is sometimes used in Scorpion Bowls served in Hawaii.
- Tiki drink expert Jeff Berry lists a recipe similar to Vic's Scorpion and Kava Bowls named the Polynesian Paralysis, among others. The cocktail includes ʻōkolehao, orange juice, pineapple juice, lemon juice, and orgeat syrup with crushed ice.
- In addition it has been used as a gin substitute in the Bee's Knees.

== Pop culture references ==
- On 3/7/1927, Sol Hoopii's Novelty Trio recorded "Hula Blues", which became and has remained a very popular recording. It is a hapa-haole song, composed by two other famous Hawaiians, Sonny Cunha and Johnny Noble. The lyrics can be heard as a paean to ʻōkolehao: 'Oh, oh, oh-oh, the hula blues,/Tell me have you ever heard those hula blues./You can't imagine what you feeling blue about,/You simply get so full of pep you're starting to shout;/She wriggles and giggles and wiggles to those hula blues.//We want her, we crave her, we love her, ʻōkolehao./Oh, we want her, we crave her, we want her, ʻōkolehao, and now./You talk about your whisky, gin or wine;/There's something makes you feel so dog-gone fine./Oh, we love her, we crave her, we want her, ʻōkolehao.'
- "Hawaiian Hospitality", a 1936 hit by Honolulu musicians Harry Owens and Ray Kinney, includes the line "When my dream of love comes true/There'll be okolehao for two." The beverage was a key ingredient in Hawaiian festivals such as the luau.
- In Hawaii 5-0 air date December 17, 2012, Chin's uncle makes Ti root moonshine.
- In Operation Pacific, a 1951 John Wayne movie, when Wayne's submarine crew get arrested for crashing and busting up a luau with the local Hawaiians asking for damages beyond Wayne's budget, he finds out the locals had illegal "okoolihau" which caused his men to get drunk. Wayne counters with a fine of equal amount to the damages to get them off the hook.
- In Think Fast, Mr. Moto during a trip on an ocean liner to Hawaii, one of the guests asks the bartender what to order. He suggests a Panther's Kiss and says it contains Okoolihao.
- In the first Charlie Chan novel, The House Without a Key, a steward tells a main character, arriving from Boston, to "Keep away from the okolehau [sic]. A few gulps, and you hit the ceiling of eternity."

== See also ==
- Domesticated plants and animals of Austronesia
