= Harry Yee =

Hawaiian bartender (1918–2022)

Harry K. Yee (September 26, 1918 – December 7, 2022) was an American bartender from Honolulu, Hawaii, who was credited with having helped to spread tiki culture during the mid-twentieth century, both in Hawaii and in the continental United States. He invented the Blue Hawaii cocktail, and is attributed with being the first bartender to use paper parasols and vanda orchids in tiki drinks.

== Biography ==
Born on September 26, 1918, Yee began bartending in 1952, before the advent of jet airliners and seven years before Hawaiian statehood. He soon joined Henry Kaiser's Hawaiian Village Hotel, where he served as head bartender for more than thirty years. Along with Ernest Gantt ("Donn Beach") and Victor Jules Bergeron ("Trader Vic"), Yee did much to popularize a faux version of the tropics consisting of rum drinks, hula girls, and tourism. Yee's time at the bar spanned statehood and the rise of Hawaii as a major international travel and retirement destination. When he began, Hawaii hosted approximately 100,000 visitors per year, mostly around Waikiki. By the time he retired tourism exceeded five million visitors, compared to seven million today.

Yee's many innovations were an attempt to create a sense of locale for his tourist customers. When they asked for Hawaiian drinks, he had nothing to offer because there was no such thing, so he invented them and often coined names on the spot. Yee is attributed with being the first bartender to use paper parasols and Vanda Orchids in tiki drinks. In an interview on the subject Yee said "We used to use a sugar cane stick [garnishes], and people would chew on the stick, then put it in the ashtray. When the ashes and cane stuck together it made a real mess, so I put orchids in the drink to make the ashtrays easier to clean. I wasn't thinking about romance."

At times during his career he was a teetotaler who relied on his customers for feedback on his drinks. He did not drink rum, preferring cognac. After retiring, he taught for several years at the Bartending Training Institute in Honolulu. On December 7, 2022, Yee died at the age of 104. His death was reported the following day on social media by bar manager and cocktail book author Cheryl Charming.

== Cocktail innovations ==
During his more than thirty years of bartending in Waikiki, Yee is attributed with inventing many cocktails, including:

- The Banana Daiquiri
- The Blue Hawaii
- The Chimp in Orbit
- The Hawaiian Eye — it was featured in the television series that used the hotel he worked in as a backdrop
- The Hot Buttered Okolehao
- Tapa Punch — the first drink he put a paper parasol in
- The Tropical Itch (a popular drink that substitutes a bamboo backscratcher for a swizzle stick)

As is common with Tiki drinks, not all drink invention attributions go unchallenged. Some credit other bartenders with having invented the Banana Daiquiri and the Hawaiian Eye cocktail.
