= Blue Hawaii (cocktail) =

Classic tropical cocktail from Hawaii

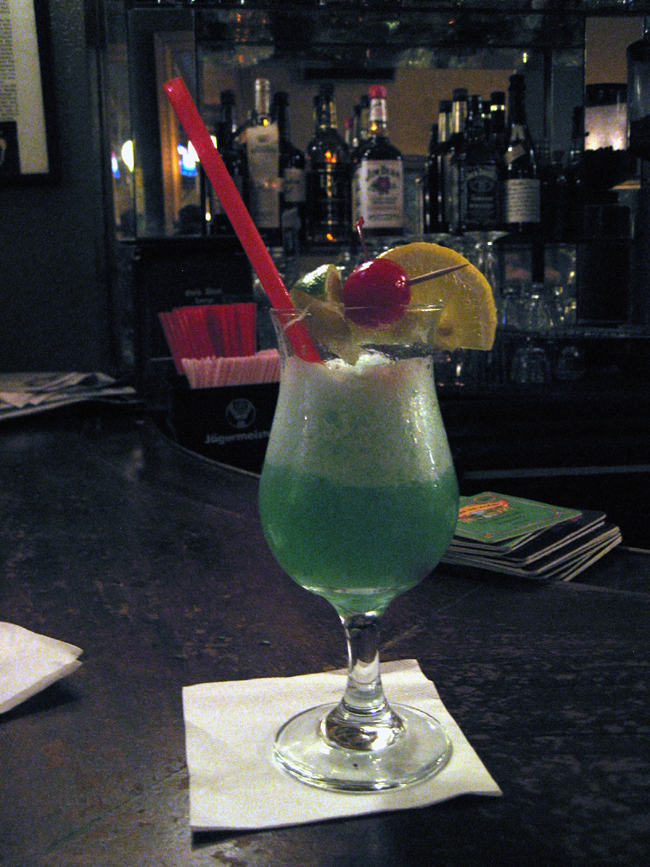
- Frozen Blue Hawaii at Gold Spike bar near Union Square, San Francisco
- Type: Mixed drink
- Ingredients: 20 mL light rum; 20 mL vodka; 15 mL blue curaçao; 90 mL pineapple juice, unsweetened; 30 mL sour mix
- Standard drinkware: Hurricane glass
- Standard garnish: pineapple or orange quarter slice, maraschino cherry
- Served: On the rocks: poured over ice
- Preparation: Combine all ingredients with ice, stir or shake, then pour into a hurricane glass with the ice. For garnish score pineapple or orange slice with a knife and insert onto rim of glass; optionally use toothpick or cocktail umbrella to spear maraschino cherry through center and attach to top of fruit slice; otherwise float cherry on top of ice.

The Blue Hawaii is a tropical cocktail made of rum, pineapple juice, blue curaçao, sweet and sour mix, and sometimes vodka.

== History and popularity ==
The Blue Hawaii was invented in 1957 by Harry Yee, head bartender of the Hilton Hawaiian Village (formerly the Kaiser Hawaiian Village) in Waikiki, Hawaii when a sales representative of Dutch distiller Bols asked him to design a drink that featured their blue color of curaçao liqueur. After experimenting with several variations, Yee settled on a version somewhat different from the most popular version today, but with the signature blue color, pineapple wedge, and cocktail umbrella.

The name "Blue Hawaii" is related only indirectly to the 1961 Elvis Presley film of the same name, and apparently derives instead from the film's title song, a hit composed by Leo Robin for the 1937 Bing Crosby film Waikiki Wedding. Yee named the drink which, along with the films and songs, the many other tropical drinks he invented, and tiki bars such as Trader Vic, did much to popularize a faux Hawaiian tiki culture, both in Hawaii and on the mainland. The era was immediately pre-statehood, a time when Hawaii was thought of by Americans as a playground for the rich.

== Preparation and variations ==
A Blue Hawaii is typically served on the rocks. There are many variations in preparation, presentation, and ingredients. Hence, it is often blended with ice, margarita-like, to be served as a frozen cocktail. Many variations of glassware are used, the more whimsical the better: tiki mugs, cocktail glasses, parfait glasses, or carved-out coconuts or pineapples.

The base liquor is usually light rum but vodka may be partially or completely substituted as a matter of taste. The Blue Hawaii is often confused with the Blue Hawaiian. Yee's Blue Hawaii does not use cream of coconut like the Blue Hawaiian. In the case of the Blue Hawaiian, a flavored rum or vodka such as Malibu Rum may eliminate the need for crème of coconut, or the coconut flavor may be omitted entirely (coconut milk, a very different product, should not be used). The Blue Hawaii and the Blue Hawaiian are different drinks; the Blue Hawaii does not use any coconut. Some venues will attempt to pass off their “version” without the pineapple in favor of sour mix. Any respectable moderately stocked bar should be able to recreate the authentic Blue Hawaii. Seemingly the only constant is the name and the blue curaçao.

Because it is easy and inexpensive to make, it is often served as a punch. At its simplest, it is a bottle or two of plain or coconut-flavored light rum, a bottle of blue curacao, a can of pineapple juice, and a bag of ice, mixed together in a punchbowl. The Blue Hawaii is seasonal, often considered a warm weather drink. Occasionally, because it contains yellow pineapple juice, the Blue Hawaii will have a green coloration instead.

== See also ==
- List of cocktails
