= Cocktail umbrella =

Small paper umbrella used as decoration

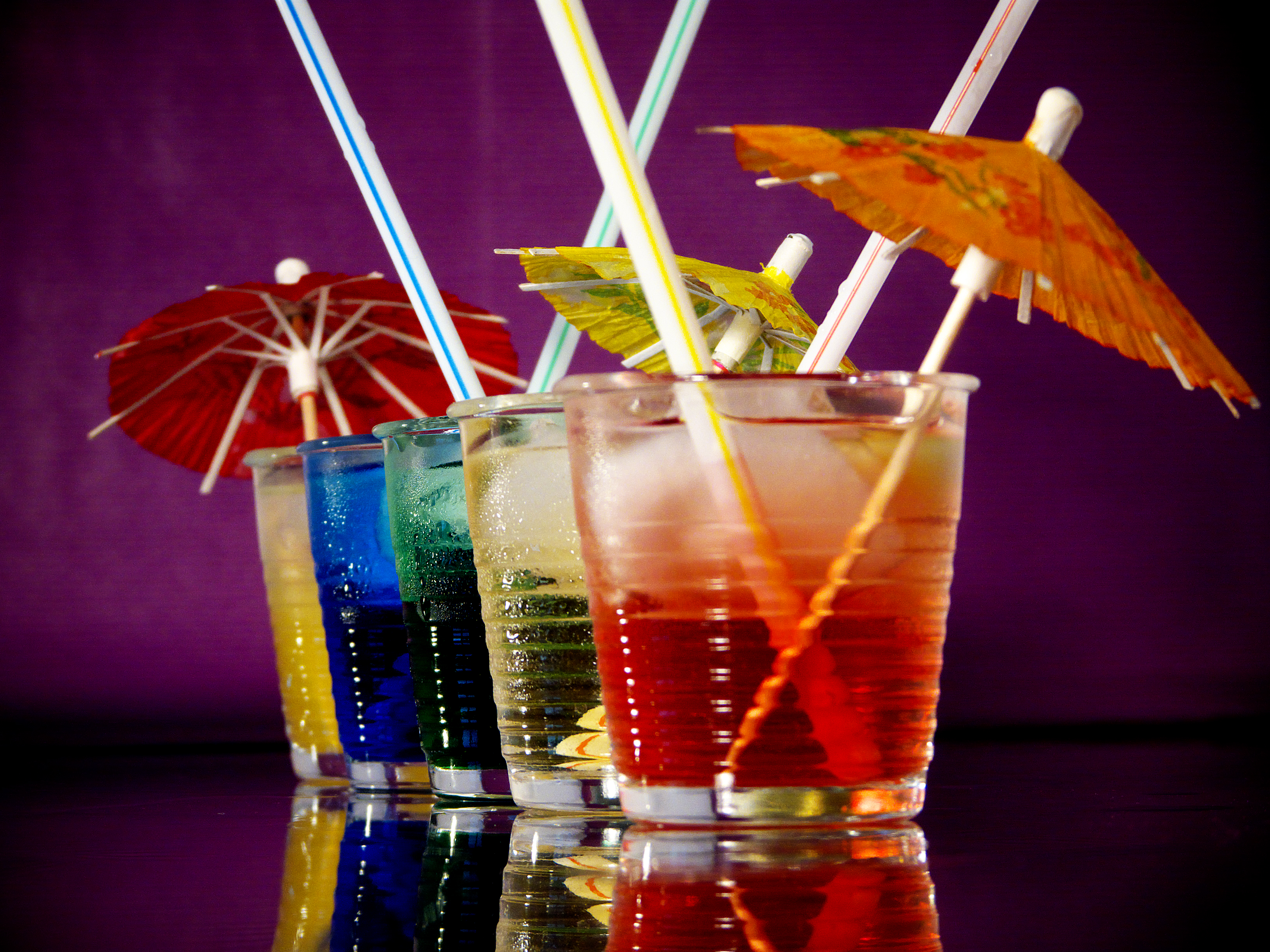
Cocktails with umbrellas

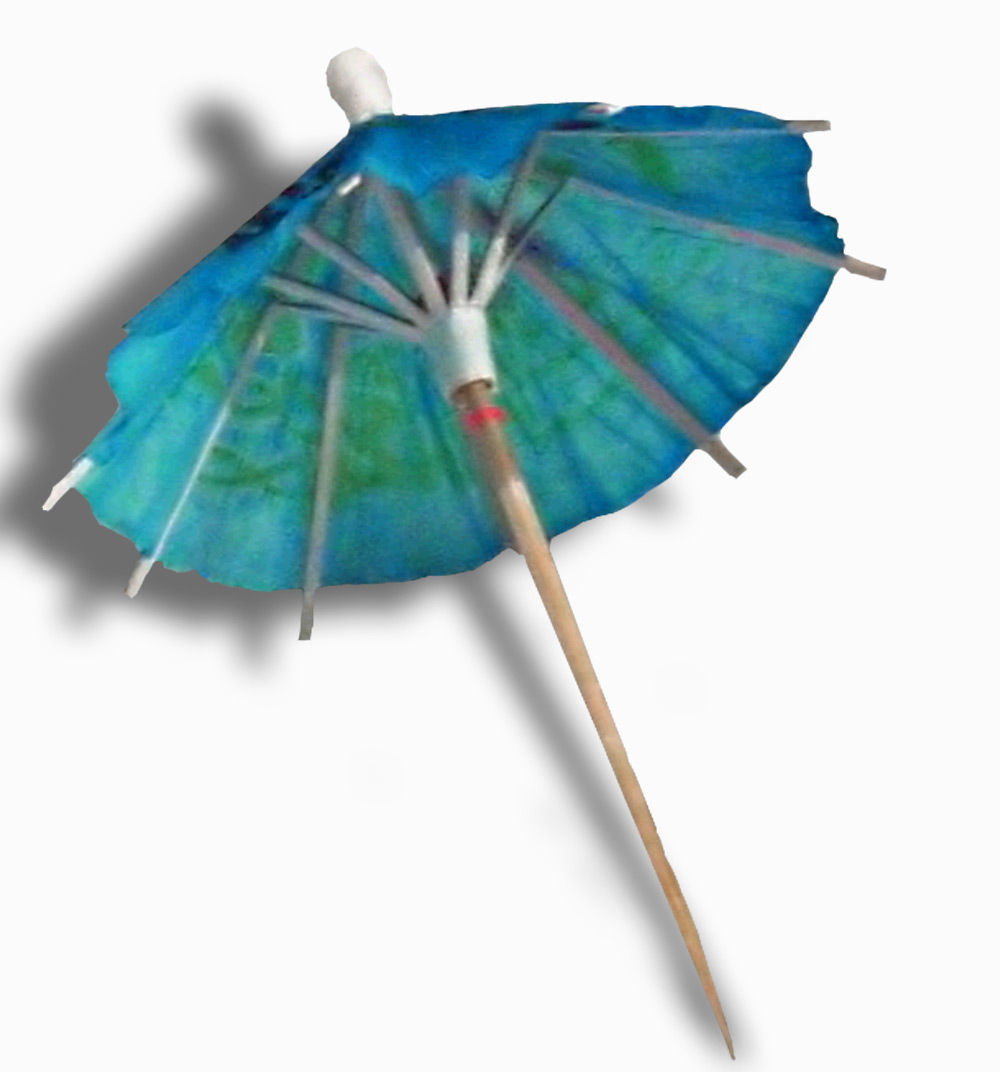
A typical cocktail umbrella— the pink ring on the toothpick functions to help keep the umbrella propped open

A cocktail umbrella or paper parasol is a small umbrella made from paper, paperboard, and a toothpick. They are frequently associated with tropical drinks and Tiki bars and used as a garnish decoration. They are also used in desserts or other foods and beverages.

== Description ==
The umbrella is fashioned out of paper, which can be patterned, with cardboard ribs. The ribs are made from cardboard in order to provide flexibility and to hinge so the umbrella can be pulled shut much like an ordinary umbrella. A small plastic retaining ring is often fashioned against the stem, a toothpick, in order to prevent the umbrella from folding up spontaneously. A sleeve of folded newspaper is located under the collar or base of the cocktail umbrella and is made out of recycled paper from either China, India or Japan. As a result, they indicate their country of origin.

== Origin and history ==
It is not quite certain exactly when the cocktail umbrella came into use. One possible source is Donn Beach, owner of the Hollywood, California-based restaurant and bar chain Don the Beachcomber. According to cocktail historian Dale DeGroff, Beach started the trend in 1932 after spending much of his time collecting things from the world, most notably from the South Pacific. Beach sold his merchandise, including the cocktail umbrellas, to Victor Bergeron, owner of the Emeryville, California-based bar chain Trader Vic's. According to Bergeron's son Joe, Trader Vic's used the paper parasols until their production was halted by World War II.

According to Hawaiian-themed author Rick Carroll, Hawaiian bartender Harry K. Yee of the Hilton Waikiki was the first to use a paper parasol in a beverage in 1959 during the Tiki culture craze of the 1950s. Yee stated that he initially would use a sugar cane stick as a garnish for his tropical cocktails, but upon seeing how guests would set the sticks in ashtrays and dirty them, switched to Vanda orchids in 1955. In 1959, Yee switched to the cocktail umbrella for reasons unknown. Some speculate that it's because the bar already stocked the umbrellas as toothpicks or decoration, so they were more readily available.

Another theory exists that Beach met Yee while vacationing in Hawaii after World War II. It is there that Beach and Yee traded cocktail ideas, recipes, and somewhere along the line, cocktail umbrellas. Afterwards, both of the bartenders began to use the umbrellas in tropical drinks.

== Tiki culture craze ==
Cocktail umbrellas are a Great Depression-era invention, but they did not take off in popularity until after World War II. According to an Eater article published in 2015, many people, during the difficult times faced during the Great Depression, saw the South Pacific as "a place of exotic abandon, where you didn't have to work for a living." Many poor Americans saw tiki culture as an escape from reality. With the rise of the middle class after World War II came families with disposable income. That, combined with Hawaii's statehood and the rise of commercial air travel in the late 1950s, led to an explosion in the popularity of tiki culture dubbed the "tiki craze". Tiki bars like Trader Vic's and Don the Beachcomber took advantage of the tiki craze, inventing slews of cocktails with a key identifying factor: a cocktail umbrella. The cocktail umbrella became synonymous with tiki cocktails, so much so that the drinks are often called "umbrella drinks".

== Purpose ==
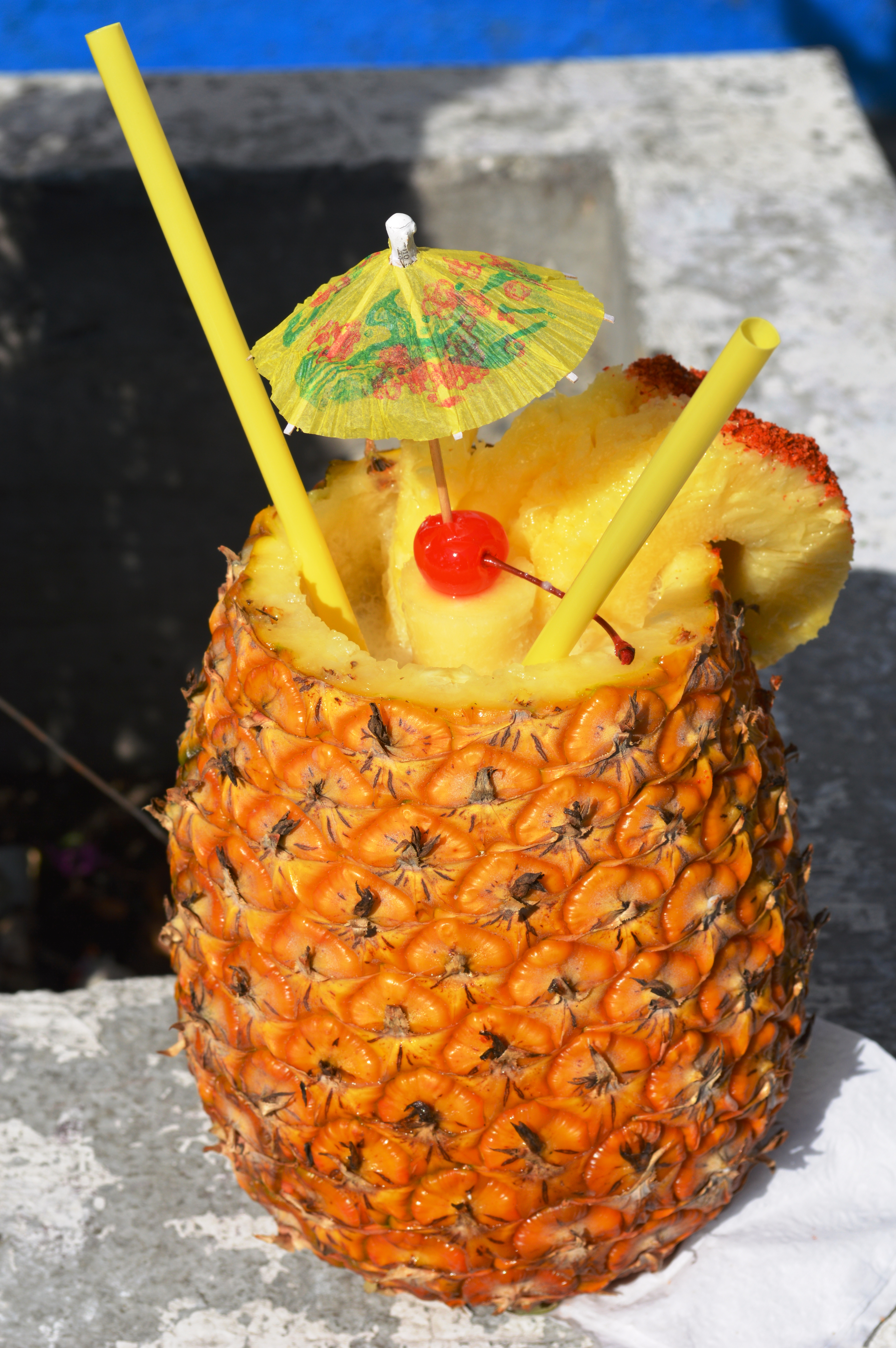
Cocktail umbrella in a pineapple drink.

The true purpose of the cocktail umbrella is unknown. Some bartenders say that the cocktail umbrella is only decorative. Other bartenders have argued that the umbrella provides shade that slows the melting of ice when the drink is served outdoors. However, the temperature outside matters more than direct sunlight when it comes to the melting of ice. The shade from the cocktail umbrella would do nothing to slow this down. Another hypothesis about the cocktail umbrella's purpose is that its absence can lead to faster evaporation of alcohol due to direct sunlight when the drink is served outdoors. Chemists reject this idea and explain that the presence of a cocktail umbrella has no effect on this. In the past, cocktail umbrellas have served as a gimmick to draw women into bars that were mostly frequented by men. However, this purpose has faded in current times.

Currently, the cocktail umbrella has become an important part of the drinks it is found on. It has become a garnish that is essential to the identities of these drinks. Cocktail garnishes started being used in the 19th century, with non-edible garnishes being introduced after prohibition. Two examples of these non-edible garnishes are cocktail umbrellas and swizzle sticks. Since their introduction, cocktail umbrellas use as a garnish has become a large part of their purpose. As a garnish, they complete the drink's presentation and identify it as tropical. However, cocktail umbrellas differ from other drink garnishes. Unlike foods commonly used as garnishes, such as cherries, olives, or citrus, cocktail umbrellas do not add to the flavor of the drink and have a purely aesthetic purpose.

Alternative uses for cocktail umbrellas also exist. They can be used as toothpicks and may have been used as hat decorations in the past. It is also possible to use them as hair decorations and place cards to tell people where to sit at a hosted event.

== Uses ==
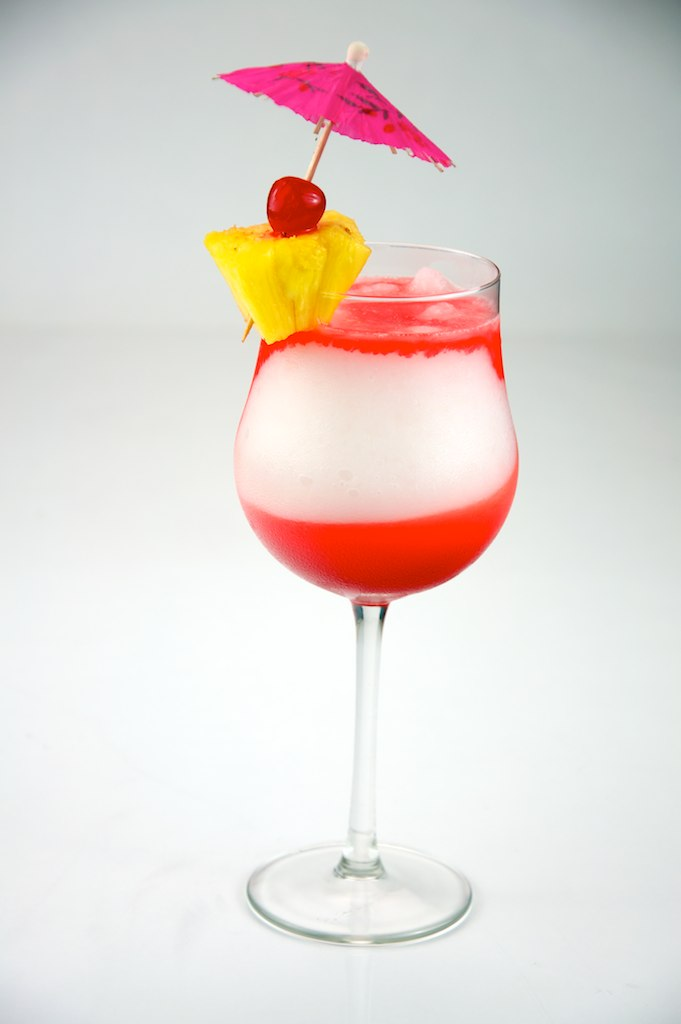
Piña Colada with a cocktail umbrella

Drinks that commonly use a cocktail umbrella include the Blue Hawaii, Clipper-Tini, Hawaiian Margarita, Lava Lava, Lava Pi, Mac Nut Martini, Mai Tai, and Piña Colada.

Though the most common use for the cocktail umbrella is as a garnish in drinks there are many other uses people have found. As a decoration piece people have used the umbrellas to make wreaths, table centerpieces, lanterns, and even hair pieces. People have also found ways to turn cocktail umbrellas into art, as is the case with Dutch trio We Make Carpets. We Make Carpets makes creative carpets out of different everyday objects. For this project, they decided to use 6,000 cocktail umbrellas in their recent creation "Umbrella Carpet 2." This unique use of cocktail umbrellas was displayed at a 2016 design exhibition in the Stedelijk Museum in Amsterdam.

== Venues ==
The cocktail umbrellas can be seen used in most cocktail lounges, bars, restaurants, and luaus. The most frequent location to spot the umbrella is restaurants and bars that maintain an "island" theme such as Hawaii.

== See also ==
- Cocktail stick
- Oil paper umbrella
- Pizza saver
- Swizzlestick Tree
- Tiki mugs

== Bibliography ==
- Susie Behar, Robert Yarham (2011). Inventions That Changed the World (100 Greatest). Igloo Books. p. 108. ISBN 978-0-85734-653-7.
