= Victory rolls =

Women's hairstyle

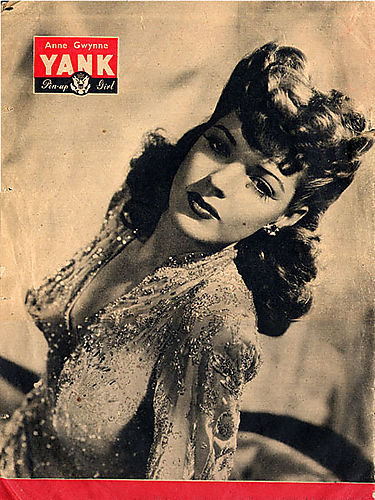
Pin-up photo of Anne Gwynne wearing victory rolls (1944)

Victory rolls are a women's hairstyle that was popular throughout much of the 1940s, with a recent resurgence in popularity during the 21st century. The style is characterized by voluminous, sausage-shaped rolls of hair styled above the ears on the side of the head or on top of the head with an open curl facing forward. Victory rolls are closely associated with pin-up models and are achieved using various backcombing, rolling, pinning, and curling techniques.

The creator of the victory rolls is unknown, but several theories exist on the style's origins. The hairstyle has received a resurgence in popularity via themed parties, the swing dance scene, and fans of vintage reproduction.

== History ==
June Marlowe wearing small victory rolls in the Argentine film Marriage in Buenos Aires (1940).

Victory rolls were most popular during 1940 to 1945, during World War II. Some theories exist as to the style's name, the most commonly repeated of which are linked with World War II and the postwar movements. One theory associates victory rolls with the aerobatic maneuver of planes that would spin horizontally as a sign of victory or celebration, as the style was supposed to resemble the movements of the aircraft. Another theory suggests the style was practical: women working in factories and war production plants adopted victory rolls to keep their hair neatly secured and away from dangerous machinery, while women in military service adopted the style to meet grooming regulations. This led to the notion that the hairstyle symbolized patriotism and support for the war effort, as women on the home front took on new roles. A 1941 article from an Australian newspaper offers yet another explanation, describing the style as inspired by the "V for Victory" campaign, noting: "A new hair style...is sweeping London at present. The hair do, called the 'Victory Roll,' with a smart upward movement, sweeps the hair from a centre parting into two inward rolls, beginning at the nape of the neck, and ending on either side of the forehead." A third theory links the name to the visual "V" shape created by the hairstyle itself.

The style was popularized by film actresses such as Ingrid Bergman and Greta Garbo. Many women wore this style to frame their faces in a way that aligned with the beauty ideals of the era. Victory rolls could be styled as a pair or as a single roll. After 1945, the popularity of the style declined as smoother hairstyles became fashionable.

Victory rolls have experienced a resurgence in vintage-era theme parties and in the swing dance scene.

== Style ==
During the World War II era, there were many variants of large curls, so it was not a single hairstyle, but several. However, what they all had in common was a "V" (for victory) in the shape of the curls on the sides of the head and it could even be an inverted "V". Other styles included a "V" shape in the parting of the hair on the top of the head. In fact, one popular theme during the era included three dots and dashes alongside the “V” which were on gloves, handkerchiefs, etc., and one variety of the hairstyle even included three small curls for the "dots" and one long curl for the "dash" while the bottom of the "V" began at the nape of the neck and continued on each side of the head, up to the temples.

To achieve a victory roll women would use hair spray and various techniques such as backcombing, rolling, pinning, and curling so that rolls would either sit on the top of their head or frame their faces. Women with thinner faces could wear their hair in front of their ears so it would look wider. Women with more disposable income would most likely go to the salon every day to get their hair done so they could achieve a shiny and slick look, whereas lower class women would have to do it themselves. Some women would also purchase wigs to avoid having to style their hair every day.

== Modern day victory rolls ==
Victory rolls and the pin-up look have gained popularity as businesses are taking advantage of the vintage look. Additionally, artists in the modern world are trying to replicate or pay homage to a vintage fashion statement.

At least one beauty salon has used the old style in collaboration with a photographer to create lingerie pin-ups. In June 2016, Truss artistic director Paulo Persil paid homage to pin-up girls from the 1940s and '50s as he created an updated collection of the vintage style.

== See also ==
- List of hairstyles
