= Barritt =

Barritt is an English surname. People with the surname Barritt include:

- Brad Barritt (born 1986), South African rugby union player in England
- Brian Sydney Barritt (1934–2011), counter-culture author and artist
- Daniel Barritt (born 1980), English rally driver
- Denis Barritt, Australian magistrate; first coroner investigating Death of Azaria Chamberlain in 1980
- John Barritt born Frederick John Barritt (1916–2014), politician and businessman of Bermuda
- John Barritt & Son of Bermuda, manufacturers of Barritt's Ginger Beer
- Joseph Barritt (1816–1881), South Australian politician and pastoralist
- Leon Barritt (1852–1938), American illustrator, journalist, and amateur astronomer
- Robert Barritt (c. 1927–2015), Bermudian artist and politician
- Ron Barritt (1919–2004), English (soccer) footballer
- Thomas Barritt (1743–1820), British archaeologist and antiquary
- Victoria Hamilton-Barritt (born 1982), British actress

== See also ==
- Desmond Barrit (1944–2026), Welsh actor
- Barrett (surname)
