= Green Swizzle =

Rum cocktail

- Type: Mixed drink
- Ingredients: falernum, carypton
- Base spirit: Rum
- Standard drinkware: Collins glass
- Served: Frozen: blended with ice

A Green Swizzle is an alcohol-containing cocktail of the sour family. It was popular in Trinidad at the beginning of the 20th century but got lost during the course of the Second World War. Today's recipes usually constitute an often distinct divergence from the original.

== History ==
The earliest written evidence for the existence of the Green Swizzle can be found in the Handbook of Trinidad Cookery written by E.M. Lickfold in 1907. That book lists a "Green Cocktail" consisting of falernum and wormwood bitters that were swizzled and completed with Angostura bitters. In the same book rum, lime juice and sugar are named as ingredients for falernum. In 1912, travel writer (and later entrepreneur and politician) Lindon Bates described a completely different drink as a Green Swizzle, naming gin, lime juice and carbonated water as its ingredients. The Green Swizzle gained popularity in the English-speaking world through the short story The Rummy Affair of Old Biffy by P. G. Wodehouse which was first published in 1924 and adopted numerous times in various anthologies. The short story does not name any ingredients though.

A guidebook published by the Trinidad Information Bureau in 1924 equates the Green Swizzle with Carypton. Carypton was a spirituous mixed drink produced by the Angostura company (then still named Dr. Siegert & Sons). Carypton already contained several ingredients of the Green Swizzle: Rum, lime juice, sugar and unspecified regional herbs and spices. In a publication from 1912 Angostura presented the Green Swizzle as Carypton on shaved ice with a few dashes of angostura bitters. According to online cocktail database Mixology the production of Carypton was discontinued in 1920 already. After World War II Angostura resumed the Carypton production, but apart from a few mentions in travel reports the Green Swizzle got lost in time.

In 1933 travel writer Owen Rutter provided a detailed recipe he got to know while travelling the West Indies:

Fill the shaker half full of crushed ice and add 1 teaspoonful of falernum, half a wine-glass of carypton, 4 dashes of wormwood bitters. Shake well, strain, and serve with 4 dashes of Angostura bitters on top.

— Owen Rutter, If Crab No Walk: A Traveller in the West Indies

As late as 1958 journalism professor and Chicago Times editor Lawrence Martin (who had travelled South America and the Caribbean three years before) defined the Green Swizzle as a cocktail based on Carypton.

Later recipes often name crème de menthe as an ingredient, but without any connection to the original cocktail. The reason for the addition of crème de menthe was the assumption that a drink named "Green Swizzle" would need to have a distinctive green colour. This fallacy was taken in by Victor Bergeron in his 1972 "Trader Vic's Bartenders Guide" and even in 2007 by cocktail historian David Wondrich:

(...) crème de menthe, since in those balmy days (...) that was the only green stuff around

— David Wondrich, David Wondrich: Green Swizzle

Cocktail encyclopedia Difford's Guide called versions with crème de menthe "modern interpretations". Wondrich corrected his error in 2015 and presented a New York Herald recipe from 1908 that confirmed falernum and wormwood bitters as ingredients.

In 2011 Canadian spirits blogger Darcy O'Neil reconstructed a Green Swizzle recipe by means of literature from 1890 to 1962 and available ingredients. The result essentially follows Rutter's description. Accidentally O'Neil located the origin of the drink in Barbados, probably because in the early 20th century the Green Swizzle was available in hotel bars not only in Trinidad, but also in neighbouring Barbados and Grenada. O'Neil used almond extract instead of falernum and produced a deep green cocktail bitter from wormwood and white rum.

== Preparation ==
As it's typical for a swizzle, the ingredients are combined in a high, narrow, cooled glass which is then filled up with crushed ice. A swizzle stick is inserted into the filled glass and then rotated with the palms while at the same time the stick is slowly moved upwards and downwards. Thereby ingredients and ice are mixed while at the same time the glass is cooled down so quickly that it forms hoarfrost on the outside. The preparation method is the same for "forged" Green Swizzles with crème de menthe.
