= Hula's Island Grill =

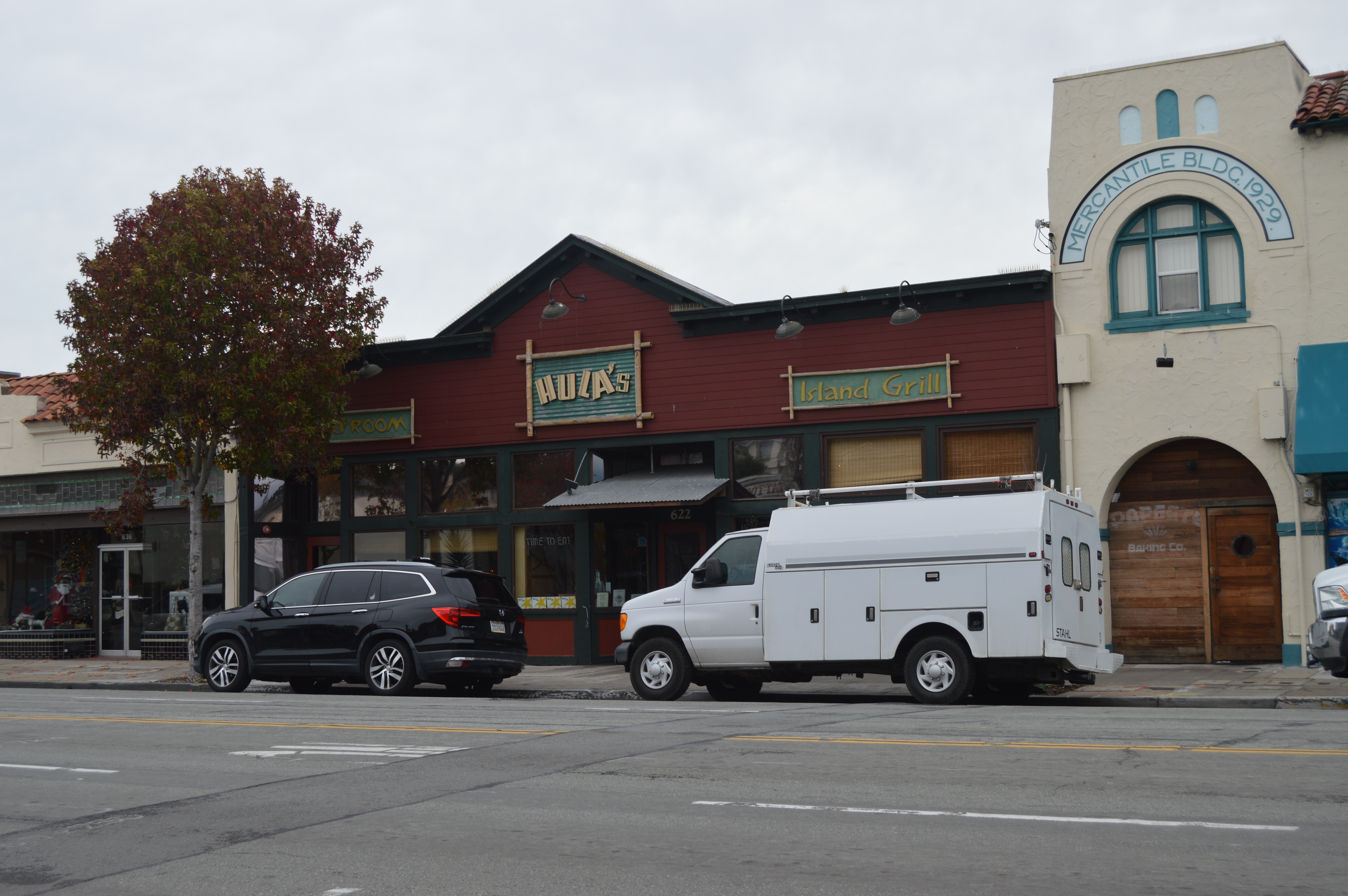
- Interactive map of Hula's Island Grill

Restaurant information
- Established: 1998
- Owners: Chris Delaney; Craig Delaney; Lynnette Griffin
- Food type: California cuisine Hawaiian cuisine
- Dress code: Casual
- Location: 622 Lighthouse Ave, Monterey, Monterey County, California, 93940, United States
- Coordinates: 36.61398°N 121.90184°W
- Seating capacity: 35
- Reservations: Yes
- Website: www.hulastiki.com

Hula's Island Grill is a restaurant in Monterey, California in the United States. It serves California and Hawaiian cuisine. The restaurant has a tiki theme. There are additional locations in Santa Cruz, California, and Phoenix, Arizona.

== History ==
Hula's Island Grill was opened in Monterey in 1998 by brothers Chris and Craig Delaney. In 2003, they expanded the restaurant to include a tiki bar. The restaurant is co-owned by Lynette Griffin.

In 2006 they opened a restaurant in Santa Cruz, California and in 2009 a location in Phoenix, Arizona. In 2018, Hula's opened a speakeasy-themed bar next to the restaurant, called Next Door.

== Design and ambiance ==
The restaurant has a tiki theme. The interior is dark and decorated with carved masks, bamboo art, and artwork by Bosko and other revivalist tiki artists. Background music includes exotica and reggae. Artwork on the menu includes photographs of historic tiki-themed restaurants. Surf films play on the bar's televisions.

== Cuisine and cocktails ==
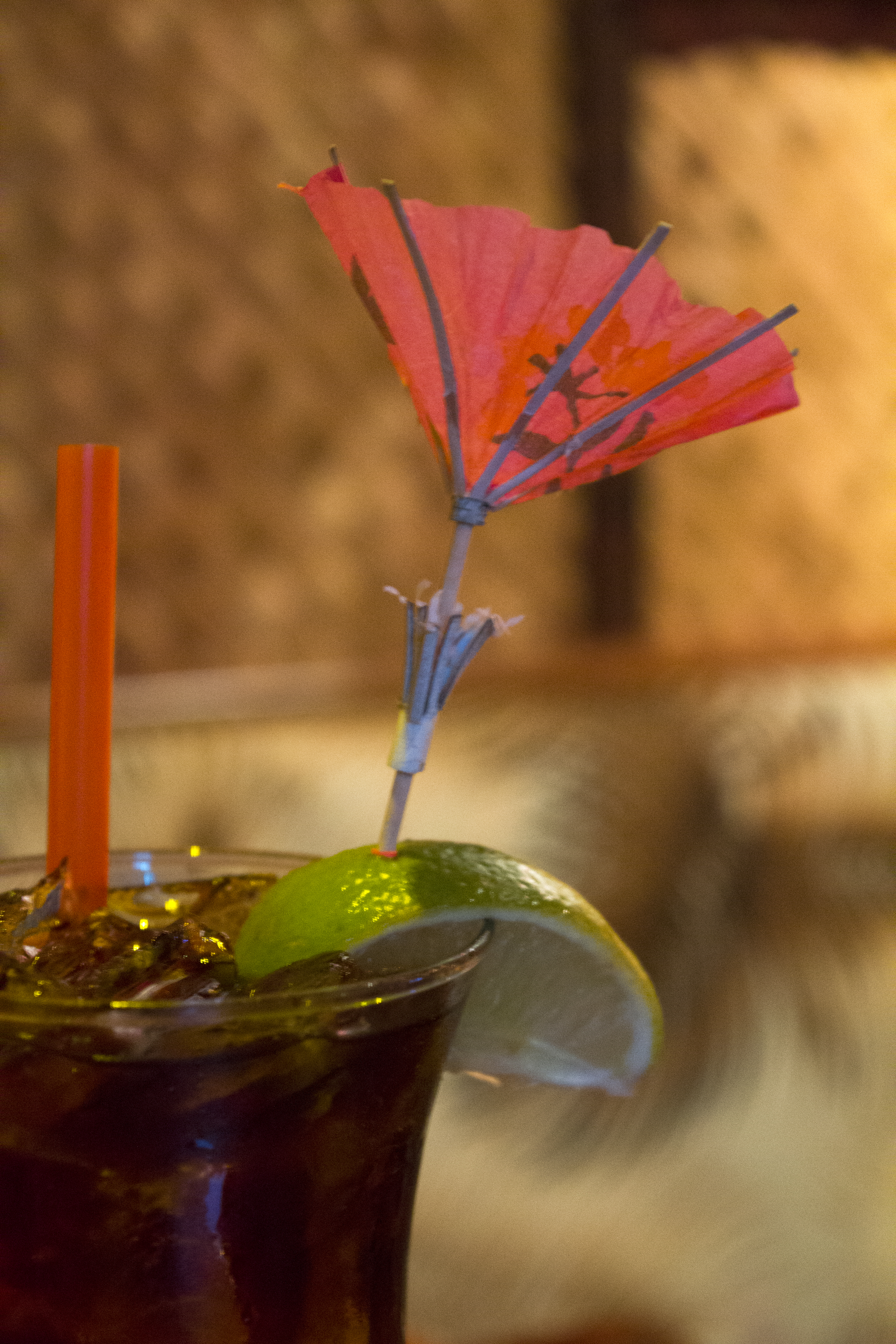
Dark 'N' Stormy with wind-ravaged cocktail umbrella at Hula's Island Grill

Hula's serves California and Hawaiian-style cuisine. The restaurant participates in the Seafood Watch program. The restaurant also serves traditional Monterey Bay foods, including abalone. Small dishes include spicy edamame, chicken wings, seared ahi wontons, fried plantains and beef kabobs ("Samurai beef sticks"). Main dishes include slow-roasted pork with soy glaze, pineapple, sticky rice and coleslaw ("Luau Pork Plate"), ribs in mango barbecue sauce ("Bali Hai Ribs"), jerk chicken, veggie burger, shrimp and fish tacos, ahi tuna sandwich, cioppino, and a "Jungle Tofu Bowl" with curry sauce, peanuts, cabbage, black beans, and rice. Recipes include Hawaiian seafood (mahi-mahi, ono, ahi tuna) and island fruits like coconut and papaya. The restaurant allows diners to choose their preferred seafood and preparation method, including blackened, pan-fried, or encrusted in macadamia nuts.

The restaurant serves American tiki-style drinks, including Mai Tais, Dark 'n' Stormy, Zombies, and drinks served in tiki-style glassware designed by Drew Brophy for the restaurant. In 2018, Hula's introduced their version of a Three Dot and a Dash, a rum-based tiki drink from the post-World War II era. The drink comprises Appleton rum, falernum, allspice, lime and agave and is served at the Next Door bar. Hula's has their own version of a hurricane made with three types of rum infused with vanilla and pineapple. They also serve martinis, including one made of blood orange.

== Reception ==
Gayot gives Hula's 12 out of 20 rating, calling it a "grass-shack-meets-tiki lounge makes for a rowdy night of entertainment." Thrillist called the cocktails at Hula's "impossibly sweet" and calls the restaurant's atmosphere "divey." The restaurant's happy hour was named the third best in Monterey County by Monterey County Now in 2015. The publication also named Hula's one of the best restaurants for vegetarians in 2013.
