= Swizzle =

Swizzle or swizzling may refer to:

== Human movement ==
- Swizzle (acro dance), a type of movement for two people in acro dance
- Swizzle (figure skating), a type of movement in figure skating

== Computer science ==
- Swizzling (computer graphics), a method of rearranging the elements of a vector
- Pointer swizzling, the manipulation of object references

== Other uses ==
- Swizzle stick, a device used for stirring drinks
- Rum Swizzle, a type of cocktail
