= Rum swizzle =

Rum-based cocktail

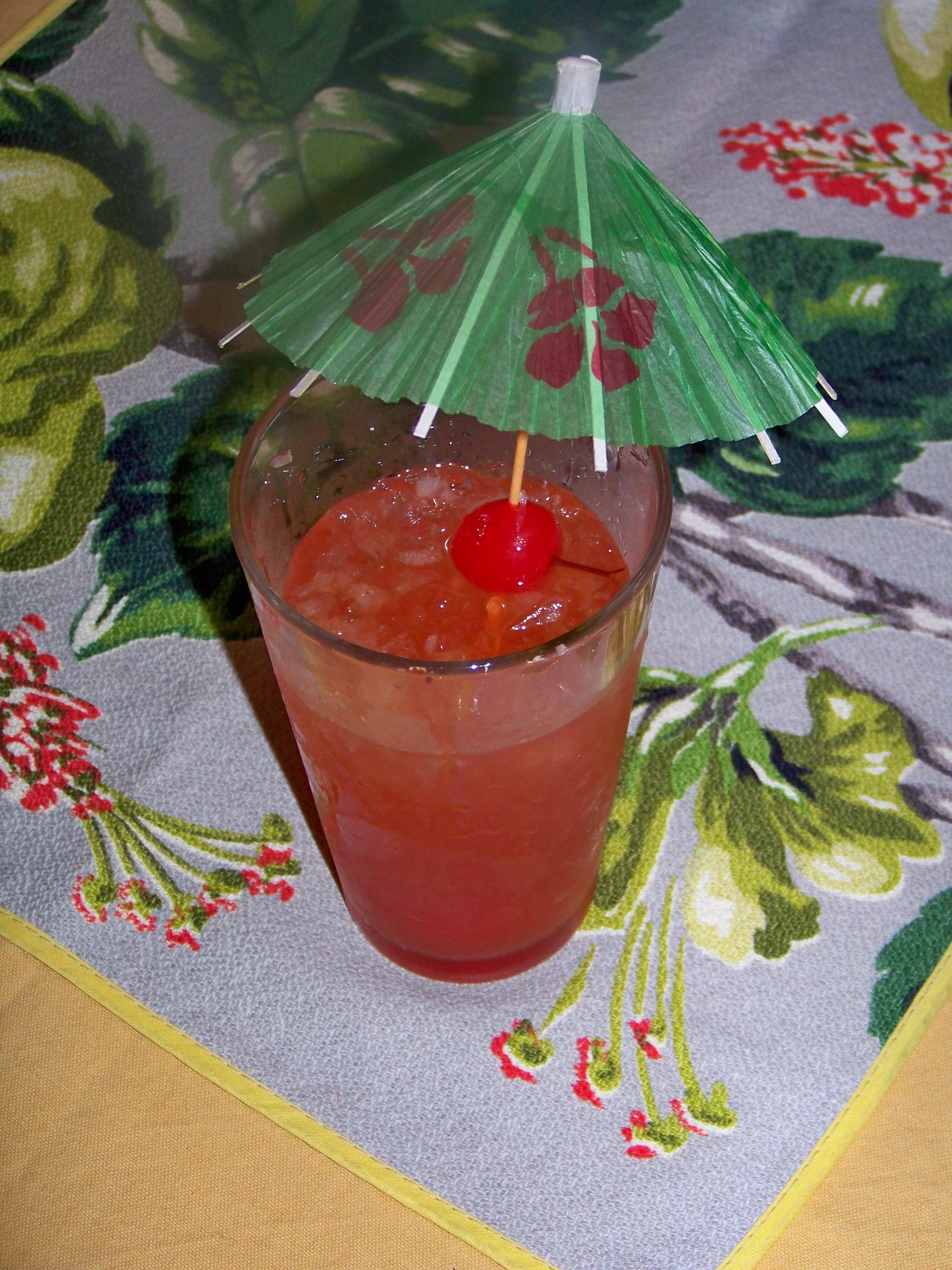
- Type: Cocktail
- Ingredients: 4oz. black rum; 4oz. gold rum; Juice of 2 lemons; 5oz. pineapple juice; 5oz orange juice; 2oz. Bermuda falernum; 6 dashes Angostura Bitters
- Base spirit: Rum
- Standard drinkware: Rocks glass
- Served: On the rocks: poured over ice
- Preparation: Mix in pitcher with crushed ice, shake vigorously until a frothing head appears. Strain into cocktail glasses. Garnish with a slice of orange and a cherry. Serves 6.

A rum swizzle is a rum-based cocktail often called "Bermuda's national drink". The Royal Gazette has referred to it as "the legendary Rum swizzle...perfect for sharing and irresistible to locals and tourists alike". In addition to providing the "swizzle" portion of the 1933 swizzle stick product name, it has been said that this potent cocktail is "as much a part of Bermuda Island culture and cuisine as is the Bermuda onion, the vibrant hibiscus, or the graceful Bermuda Longtail."

== Recipes ==
Different bartenders have varying interpretations of this drink. One of the older recipes was presented in the 1941 Old Mr. Boston De Luxe Official Bartender Guide. Gosling's Rum, which is based in Bermuda, publishes a recipe with two different rums from their brand line. Rum, fruit juice (often including lime, and orange and pineapple juice), and a flavored sweetener such as falernum or grenadine are the most consistent ingredients, and the drink is generally shaken or stirred with ice.

== History ==
Icy drink mixtures with rum, first identified as swizzles and later as rum swizzles, have been mentioned in literature in a variety of locations since the mid 18th century: Fort Ticonderoga, New York (1760), the Caribbean island of Saint Kitts (1838), Bridgetown, Barbados (1841), Great Britain (1862), Bridgeport, Barbados (1908), and the island of Saint Thomas in the U.S. Virgin Islands (1911). In these earliest versions, the drink typically consisted of one part of rum diluted with five or six parts water (sometimes with additional aromatic ingredients), which was mixed by rotating between the palms of the hands a special forked stick made from a root; another account describes it as spruce beer with added rum and sugar.

In his 1909 book, Beverages, Past and Present: An Historical Sketch of Their Production, Brotherhood Winery owner Edward R. Emerson asserted that rum swizzles originated on the Caribbean island of Saint Kitts. American naturalist and writer Frederick Albion Ober noted in 1920 that the great drink of the Barbados ice houses was the swizzle, a combination of liquors, sugar, and ice whisked to a froth by a rapidly revolved "swizzle-stick" made from the stem of a native plant, perhaps Quararibea turbinata (the "swizzlestick tree") or an allspice bush. The etymology of the word "swizzle" is unknown, but it may derive from a similar beverage known as switchel.

Rum swizzles were the drink of choice at what was purportedly the world's first cocktail party held in London, England in 1924 by novelist Alec Waugh. A reference to a (possibly fictitious) "green swizzle" drink dates to 1925 (see "Other swizzles" below). The rum swizzle is also mentioned in Sinclair Lewis's 1925 novel Arrowsmith, which is set in the fictional Caribbean island of St. Hubert. In 1930, the drink was referenced in a book written by Joseph Hergesheimer, which refers to the drink containing Bacardi rum and bitters, as well as a swizzle stick made of sassafras. The Rum Swizzle was also mentioned in the 1931 autobiographical novel Half a Loaf, penned by Sinclair Lewis's former wife Grace Hegger Lewis about their life together.

Today the rum swizzle is often associated with The Swizzle Inn of Bailey's Bay, Bermuda, whose motto is "Swizzle Inn, Swagger Out." The Swizzle Inn calls itself "the home of the rum swizzle" and Bermuda's oldest pub, favourite drinking hole of island resident Michael Douglas As noted by the Bermuda Hotel Association:

The Swizzle Inn pub sold its first Rum Swizzle in 1932 and the rest, as they say, is history...Now it's the perfect place to whet your whistle with our national drink: the potent Rum Swizzle!

—

== Other swizzles ==
151 swizzle
- Type: Cocktail
- Ingredients: 1.5oz. 151-proof rum; 0.5oz fresh-squeezed lime juice; 0.5oz. 1:1 Simple Syrup; 6 drops (1/8 tsp) of Pastis, herbsaint, or absinthe; 1 dashes Angostura Bitters
- Base spirit: Rum
- Standard drinkware: Pilsner glass
- Standard garnish: Grated Nutmeg, Cinnamon stick
- Served: On the rocks: poured over ice
- Preparation: Fill half a tall glass with crushed ice. Add all ingredients and swizzle (or stir with a long spoon) until ice forms on the outside of the glass (approx 8-10 seconds). Top with additional crushed ice. Alternative: Combine liquid ingredients and crushed ice in blender, blend on high 5 seconds. Pour into frosty pre-chilled metallic or tiki mug. Garnish with grated nutmeg and cinnamon stick.

A variant created by Don the Beachcomber first served in the 1930s, the 151 swizzle utilized overproof rum for stronger flavor.

Trader Vic's Bartender's Guide presents several variant swizzle recipes including the Kingston swizzle (made with Jamaican rum and hot water), the Kona Swizzle (incorporating almond syrup), and the Martinique Swizzle (flavored with Herbsaint, Pernod or anisette). According to that guide:

Swizzles originated in the West Indies, where everything, including hot chocolate, is swizzled. A swizzle stick is the branch of a tropical bush with three to five forked branches on the end. You insert this in the glass or pitcher and twirl the stem rapidly between the palms of your hands. By rapid swizzling with fine ice, you'll get a good outside frost such as on a Julep. Of course you won't get this frost if you haven't used enough liquor; a generous amount of liquor is important...Most true Swizzles, because of their origin, call for rum; but nearly all punches can be swizzled. Punches for three or four people can be mixed in a pitcher with fine ice and swizzled until the pitcher frosts, and then poured into tall glasses...Simple, good, really a good drink.

—

The Spirit of Bermuda cookbook says that the "Bermuda swizzle stick" with which this drink is traditionally stirred and garnished is a three-pronged stick often cut from an allspice bush. The green swizzle, a drink for which the recipe "has been lost in history" (if it ever existed) is mentioned by Bertie Wooster in "The Rummy Affair of Old Biffy" by P. G. Wodehouse:

I have never been in the West Indies, but I am in a position to state that in certain of the fundamentals of life they are streets ahead of our European civilization...A planter, apparently, does not consider he has had a drink unless it contains at least seven ingredients, and I'm not saying, mind you, that he isn't right. The man behind the bar told us the things were called Green Swizzles; and, if ever I marry and have a son, Green Swizzle Wooster is the name that will go down in the register...

—

The Trader Vic's guide quoted above also has a recipe for a green swizzle (this one incorporating green crème de menthe) but specifies it is "not what Bertie (Wooster) had at Wembley."

== See also ==
- Chartreuse swizzle
- Dark 'n' stormy, another iconic Caribbean cocktail sometimes referred to as Bermuda's national drink
- Planter's punch
