= Moscow mule =

Cocktail

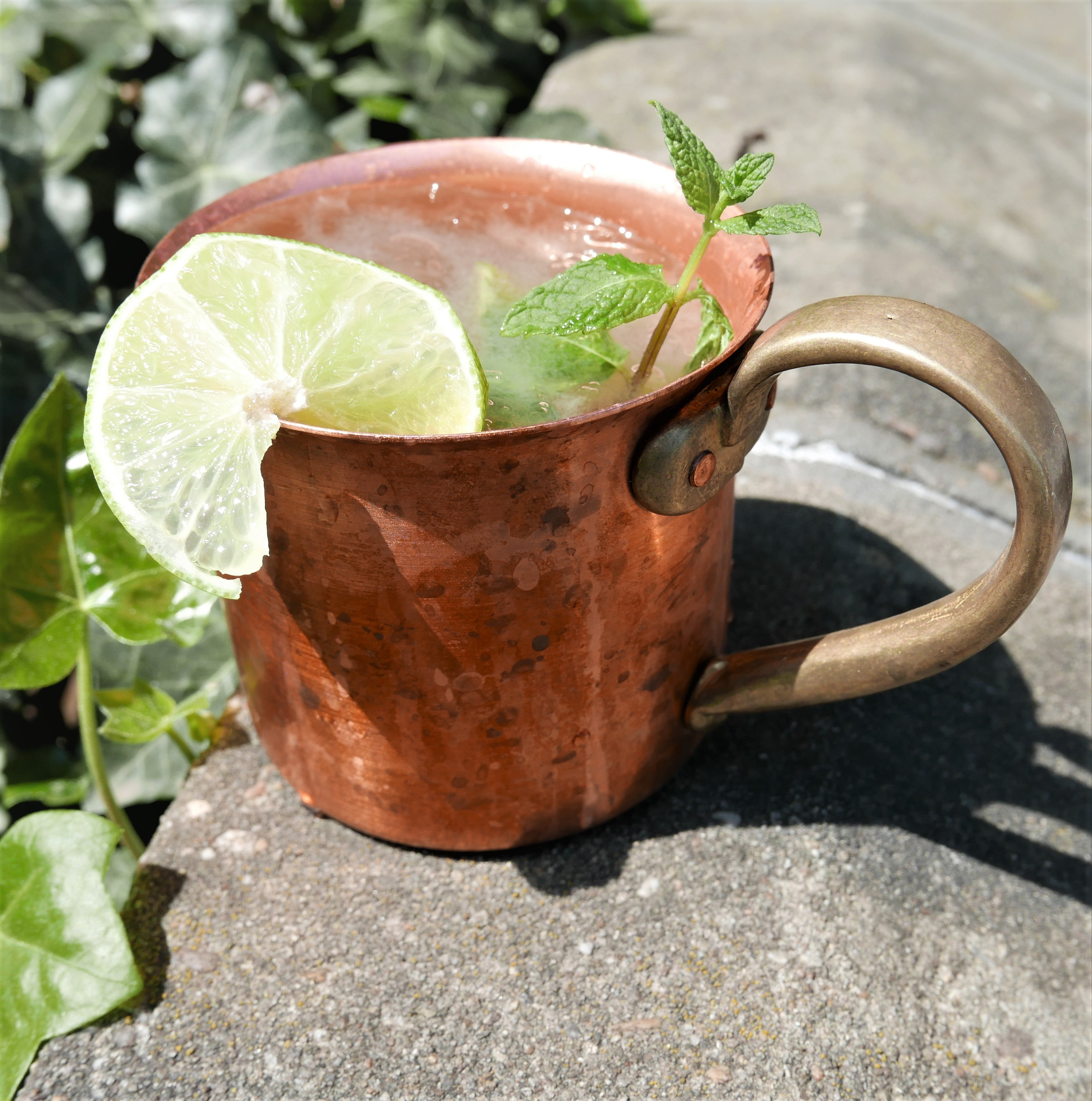
- Type: Mixed drink
- Ingredients: 45 ml vodka; 10 ml lime juice; 120 ml ginger beer
- Base spirit: Vodka
- Website: iba-world.com/moscow-mule/
- Standard drinkware: copper mug
- Standard garnish: Lime Slice
- Served: On the rocks: poured over ice
- Preparation: In a Mule Cup or rocks glass, combine the vodka and ginger beer. Add lime juice and gently stir to involve all ingredients.

A Moscow mule is a cocktail made with vodka, ginger beer, and lime juice; garnished with a slice or wedge of lime. The drink, being a type of buck, is sometimes called vodka buck. It is properly served in a copper mug, which takes on the cold temperature of the liquid.

Some public health advisories recommend copper mugs with a protective coating (such as stainless steel) on the inside and the lip, to reduce the risk of copper toxicity.

== Variations ==
Due to the popularity of the Moscow mule, other buck cocktails with different liquors or other ingredients have been labeled with the "mule" name in recent years. Variations with the name changed accordingly:

- Aussie mule: Pear vodka, lime juice, pineapple juice.
- Aussie mule: Bundaberg Rum.
- Berner mule: Ingwerer.
- Bohemian mule: Absinthe.
- Budapest mule: Unicum.
- Canary mule: Honey rum
- Congo mule: Tonic water
- Dead man's mule: Absinthe and cinnamon schnapps.
- French mule: Cognac and angostura bitters.
- Gin-gin mule, London mule, Munich mule, Foghorn: Gin.
- Glasgow mule: Blended Scotch whisky and St-Germain liqueur.
- Idaho mule: Huckleberry vodka.
- Irish mule: Irish whiskey.
- Jallu-muuli: Jaloviina.
- Jamaican mule: Spiced rum.
- Kentucky mule, Horsefeather: Bourbon.
- Kyiv mule: Name rebrand in Ukraine due to the Russo-Ukrainian war.
- Manila mule: Lambanog and calamansi instead of lime.
- Merican Mule: Canned Moscow Mule brand.
- Mexican mule: Tequila.
- Mezcal mule: Mezcal.
- Mistletoe mule: Garnished with rosemary and cranberries.
- Mumbai mule: Moscow mule, coriander, cumin.
- New Orleans mule: Bourbon and coffee liqueur.
- Oslo mule: Akvavit.
- Prickly pear mule: Pear liqueur and Poire Williams.
- Southern mule: Southern Comfort liqueur.
- Tennessee mule: Tennessee whiskey.
- Tuscan mule: Tuaca liqueur.
- Berlin mule: Jägermeister
- Mississippi mule: Cathead Honeysuckle vodka.
- Westphalian mule: Korn, Apple juice instead of lime and cucumber

Another variation uses ginger syrup instead of ginger beer.

Other ingredients, such as carrot juice and angostura bitters, can also be added.

A variant which uses Mountain Dew soda in place of the ginger beer is known as a Moscow Mole.

== History ==
George Sinclair's 2007 article on the origin of the drink quotes the New York Herald Tribune from 1948:

The mule was born in Manhattan but "stalled" on the West Coast for the duration. The birthplace of "Little Moscow" was in New York's Chatham Hotel. That was back in 1941 when the first carload of Jack Morgan's Cock 'n' Bull ginger beer was railing over the plains to give New Yorkers a happy surprise…The Violette Family helped. Three friends were in the Chatham bar, one John A. Morgan, known as Jack, president of Cock 'n' Bull Products and owner of the Hollywood Cock 'n' Bull Restaurant; one was John G. Martin, president of G.F. Heublein Brothers Inc. of Hartford, Conn., and the third was Rudolph Kunett, president of the Pierre Smirnoff, Heublein's vodka division. As Jack Morgan tells it, "We three were quaffing a slug, nibbling an hors d'oeuvre and shoving toward inventive genius". Martin and Kunett had their minds on their vodka and wondered what would happen if a two-ounce shot joined with Morgan's ginger beer and the squeeze of a lemon. Ice was ordered, lemons procured, mugs ushered in and the concoction put together. Cups were raised, the men counted five and down went the first taste. It was good. It lifted the spirit to adventure. Four or five days later the mixture was christened the Moscow mule...

Mayo Methot's husband, Percy T. Morgan, an oil tycoon, was a co-owner of the Cock n' Bull restaurant.

This story was well known for years, however in 2007, a new version of the invention of the Moscow mule cocktail was published. In this story the cocktail's inventor was Wes Price, getting the idea from Hudes Potache, Morgan's head bartender and the drink was born out of a need to clear the bar's cellar, packed with unsold inventory, including vodka and ginger beer.

Eric Felten quotes Wes Price in an article that was published in 2007 in The Wall Street Journal:

"I just wanted to clean out the basement," Price would say of creating the Moscow mule. "I was trying to get rid of a lot of dead stock." The first one he mixed he served to the actor Broderick Crawford. "It caught on like wildfire," Price bragged."

The Moscow mule is often served in a copper mug. The popularity of this drinking vessel is attributable to Martin, who went around the United States to sell Smirnoff vodka and popularize the Moscow mule. Martin asked bartenders to pose with a specialty copper mug and a bottle of Smirnoff vodka, and took Polaroid photographs of them. He took two photos, leaving one with the bartender for display. The other photo was put into a collection and used as proof to the next bar Martin visited of the popularity of the Moscow mule. The copper mug remains, to this day, a popular serving vessel for the Moscow mule.

According to a 1942 Insider Hollywood article, the Moscow mule was most popular in Los Angeles, where it originated. The Nevada State Journal (October 12, 1943) reinforced the mule's popularity in reporting: "Already the mule is climbing up into the exclusive handful of most-popular mixed drinks". It became known as a favorite drink of Reno casino owner William F. Harrah. In his book Beat the Dealer (1964), Edward O. Thorp did not name the Tahoe casino where he thought he had been poorly treated as a card counter. Instead, he wrote, "Immediately I had a Moscow mule", subtly hinting that the location was Harrah's Lake Tahoe, due to Harrah's then well-known proclivity for the drink.

Following the Russian invasion of Ukraine in February 2022, some American and Canadian bars began to refer to the drink as a "Kyiv mule" – referring to the Ukrainian capital of Kyiv – in protest of the invasion.

== Health concerns ==
There are some health concerns related to the tradition of serving a Moscow Mule in a copper vessel. The ingredients in a Moscow mule cocktail are acidic, and the resulting beverage has a pH well below 6.0. This creates a problem when using traditional copper mugs without coating, as copper can start dissolving into acidic solutions. Copper in solution is considered toxic at concentrations above 1 mg/L. On July 28, 2017, the Iowa Alcoholic Beverages Division issued a statement that pure copper vessels should not be used to serve acidic drinks, but that "copper mugs lined on the interior with another metal, such as nickel or stainless steel, are allowed to be used and are widely available". The U.S. Food and Drug Administration (FDA) 2013 Food Code states that copper and copper alloys such as brass "may not be used in contact with a food that has a pH below 6 such as vinegar, fruit juice, or wine or for a fitting or tubing installed between a backflow prevention device and a carbonator."

The FDA's Model Food Code specifically prohibits copper from "coming into direct contact with foods that have a pH below 6.0". The advisory relates only to solid copper mugs. Copper mugs that are lined with stainless steel or other food-safe materials are exempt from the advisory.

The risk of copper poisoning has however been questioned by Trisha Andrew, who teaches chemistry at University of Massachusetts Amherst, saying that the short duration of a usual serving would not cause the copper levels to rise high enough to pose a risk.

== See also ==
- Highball
- Dark 'n' stormy
