= Jefferson's =

Jefferson's can refer to:

- A nickname for the United States two-dollar bill, featuring Thomas Jefferson
- Jefferson's Bourbon, a Kentucky distilled bourbon whiskey

== See also ==
- Jefferson (disambiguation)
