= Brady's Irish Cream =

Sweet Irish liquor produced in Ireland

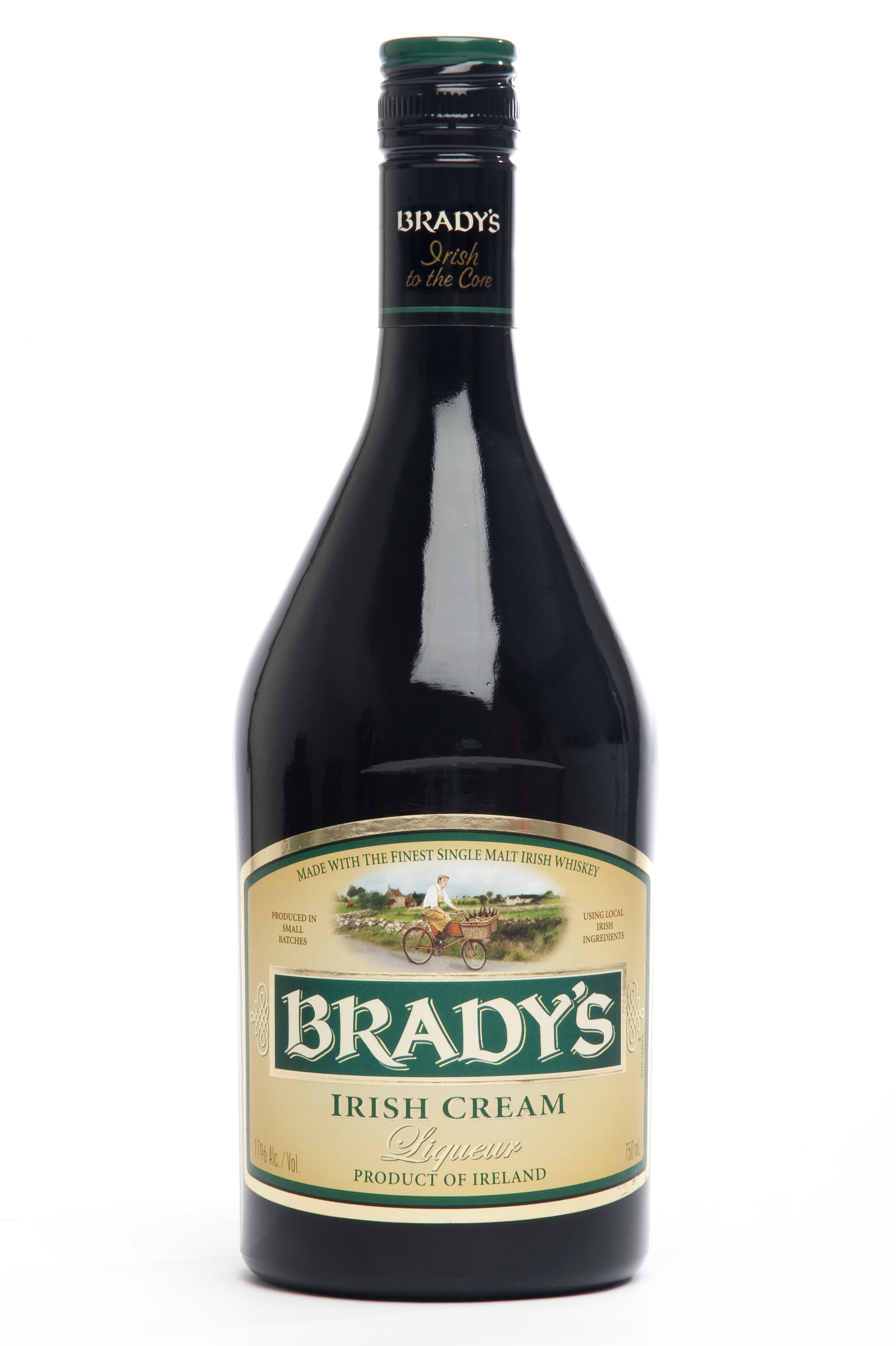
- Bottle of Brady's Irish Cream
- Manufacturer: Castle Brands
- Country of origin: Ireland
- Alcohol by volume: 17.0%
- Proof (US): 34
- Website: www.bradysirishcream.com

Brady's Irish Cream is an Irish whiskey and cream based liqueur that is produced in Ireland, northwest of Dublin. The brand is owned by New York-based company Castle Brands Inc. It is comparable to other cream liqueurs like Bailey's and Amarula.

== Production ==
Brady's Irish Cream is produced in County Cavan, Ireland.

The brand emphasizes the freshness of its ingredients, stating that the cream is used within 48 hours of reaching the distillery. It is then combined with Irish whiskey, as well as other flavorings before being bottled. It has an alcohol content of 17% ABV.

== Reviews ==
Brady's received a 91 and “Great Value” award at the 2012 Ultimate Spirits Challenge.
