= Celtic Honey =

Liqueur brand from New York

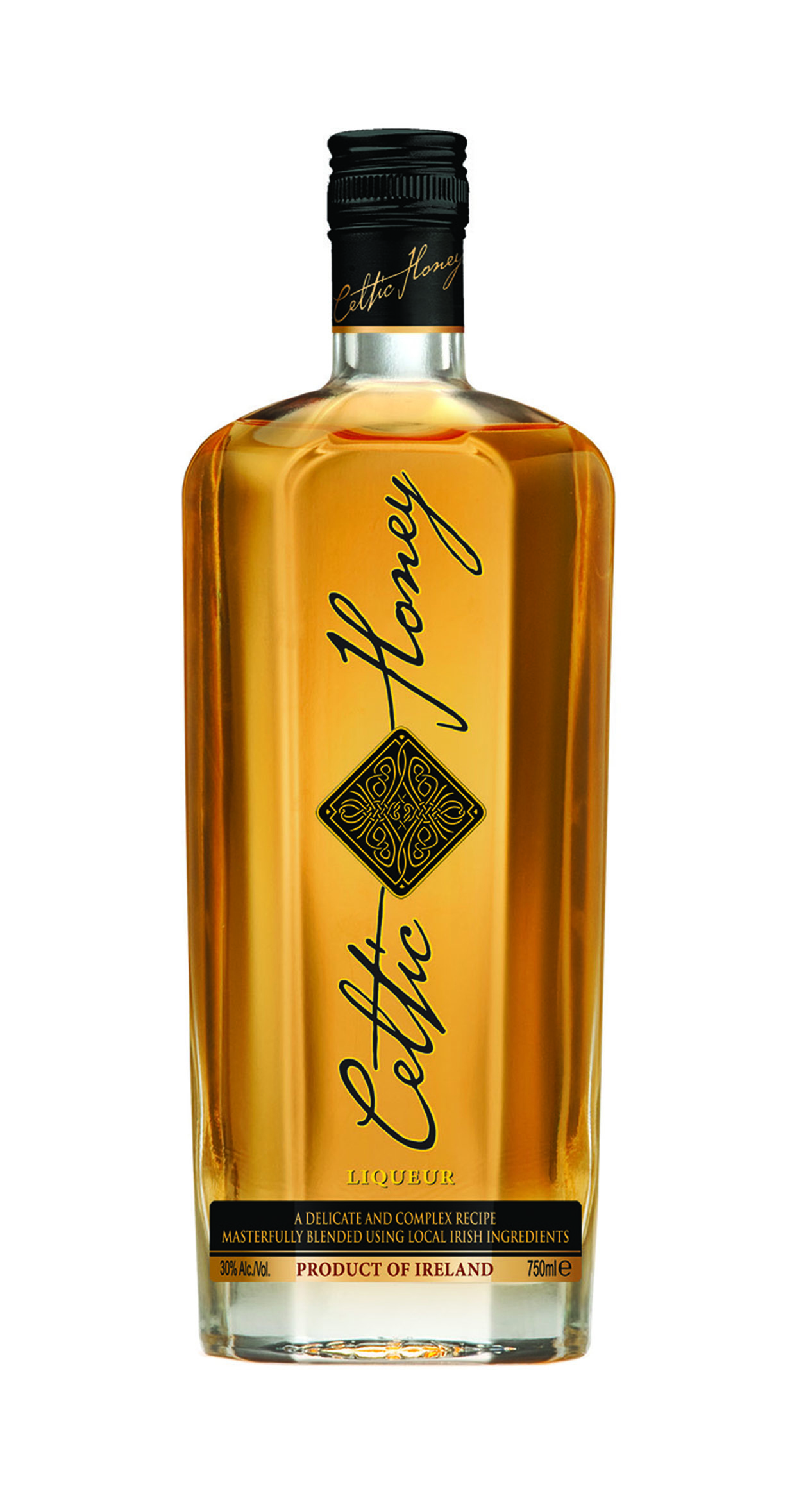
- Bottle of Celtic Honey
- Manufacturer: Castle Brands
- Country of origin: Ireland
- Alcohol by volume: 30%
- Proof (US): 60
- Website: http://www.celtichoney.com/

Celtic Honey is a liqueur brand owned by Castle Brands Inc, based in New York, NY. It is a sweet, honey-based, 30% ABV liqueur made from Irish whiskey, honey and spices. Produced in Ireland, it can be served straight, on the rocks or added to mixed drinks.

It is similar to other honey-based liqueurs such as Barenjager.

== History ==
Originally sold as “Celtic Crossing” to honor the large number of Irish immigrants who came to America in the 19th and 20th centuries, the liqueur was re-launched as Celtic Honey in 2011 to emphasize its ingredients. It was also re-launched with a new bottle and label, which utilizes traditional Celtic knot designs in the shape of a honeybee and the font Cezanne, by P22 type foundry.

The recipe is based on the fermented honey drink, mead.

== Tasting notes ==
“Pure golden color. Aromas of buckwheat honey, dried flowers and nougat with a soft, sweet light-to-medium body and a touch of delicate blended whiskey notes on the honeyed nut finish. A light, feminine liqueur for sipping on the rocks.”
