= Gosling Brothers =

Bermudan liquor company

Gosling Brothers Limited
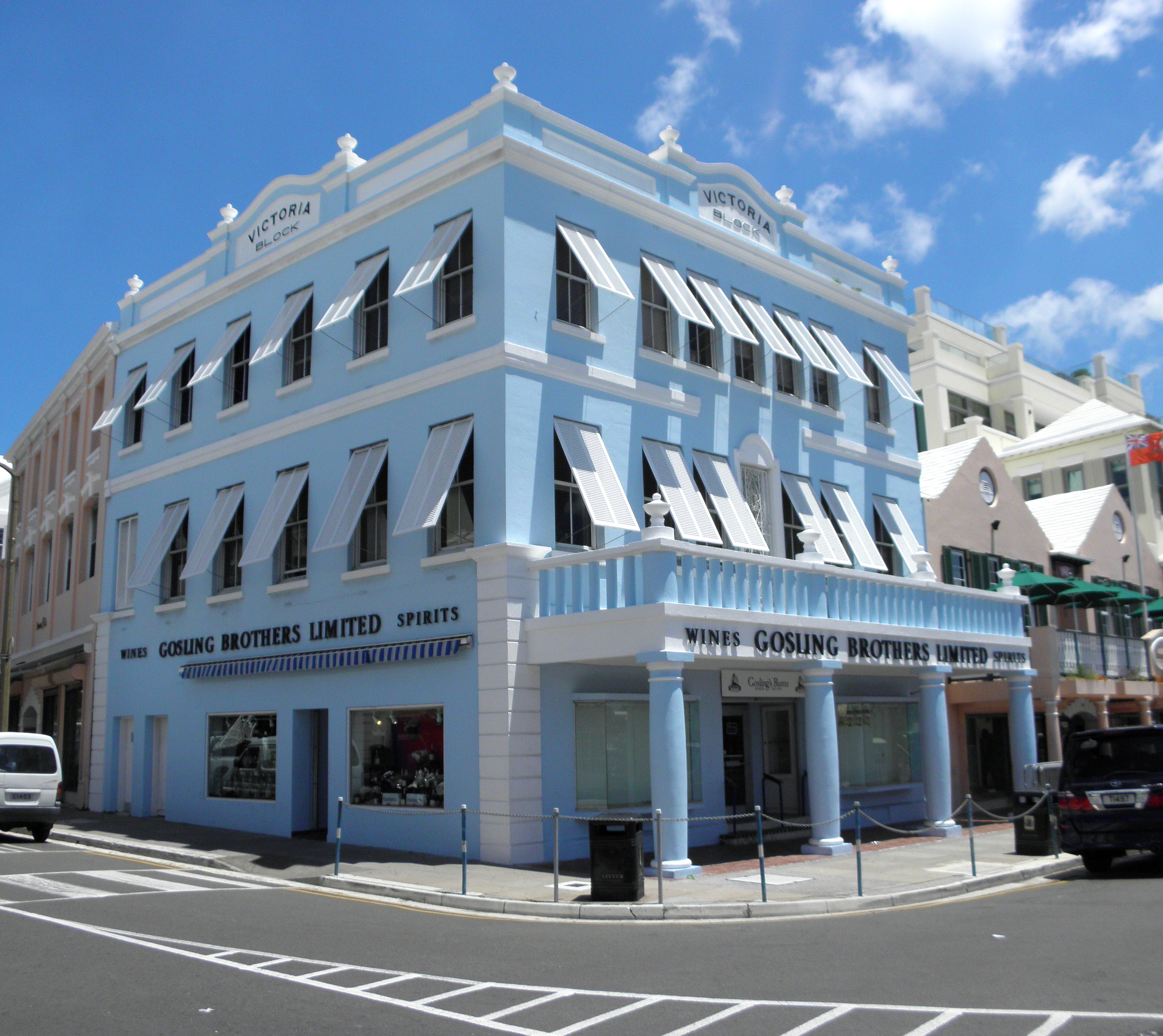
- Gosling Brothers headquarters building in Hamilton, Bermuda
- Type: Private
- Industry: Distilled beverages, imports, exports, retail
- Founded: St. George's, Bermuda (December 1806)
- Headquarters: Hamilton, Bermuda
- Key people: The Gosling Family
- Products: Rum, Ginger beer
- Parent: Castle Brands (Pernod Ricard)
- Website: www.goslingsrum.com

Gosling Brothers Limited is a Bermudian company primarily concerned with blending and distributing rum, importing and distributing spirits on the island, and maintaining a retail presence.

== History ==
In early 1806 James Gosling set out from England with £10,000 in merchandise bound for America. The ship's charter had expired on the ninety-first day of the voyage, so they set in at the nearest port, Bermuda. However, instead of going on to America, Gosling set up shop on the island later that year.

In 1824, the company rented their iconic store on Front Street.

The Goslings started formulating rum blends in 1860, and in three years, they had developed Old Rum, a dark, full-bodied rum. Originally distributed only in barrels and sold to those bringing their own bottles, the rum became more widely available with the introduction of bottling in Champagne bottles, the most widely available at the time. The bottles were salvaged from the Bermuda Garrison Officers' Messes and were sealed with black sealing wax. Soon, people were asking for more of the 'black seal' rum, prompting the change to the name Black Seal Rum.

Gosling Brothers holds the trademark for the Dark 'N Stormy cocktail.

== Products ==
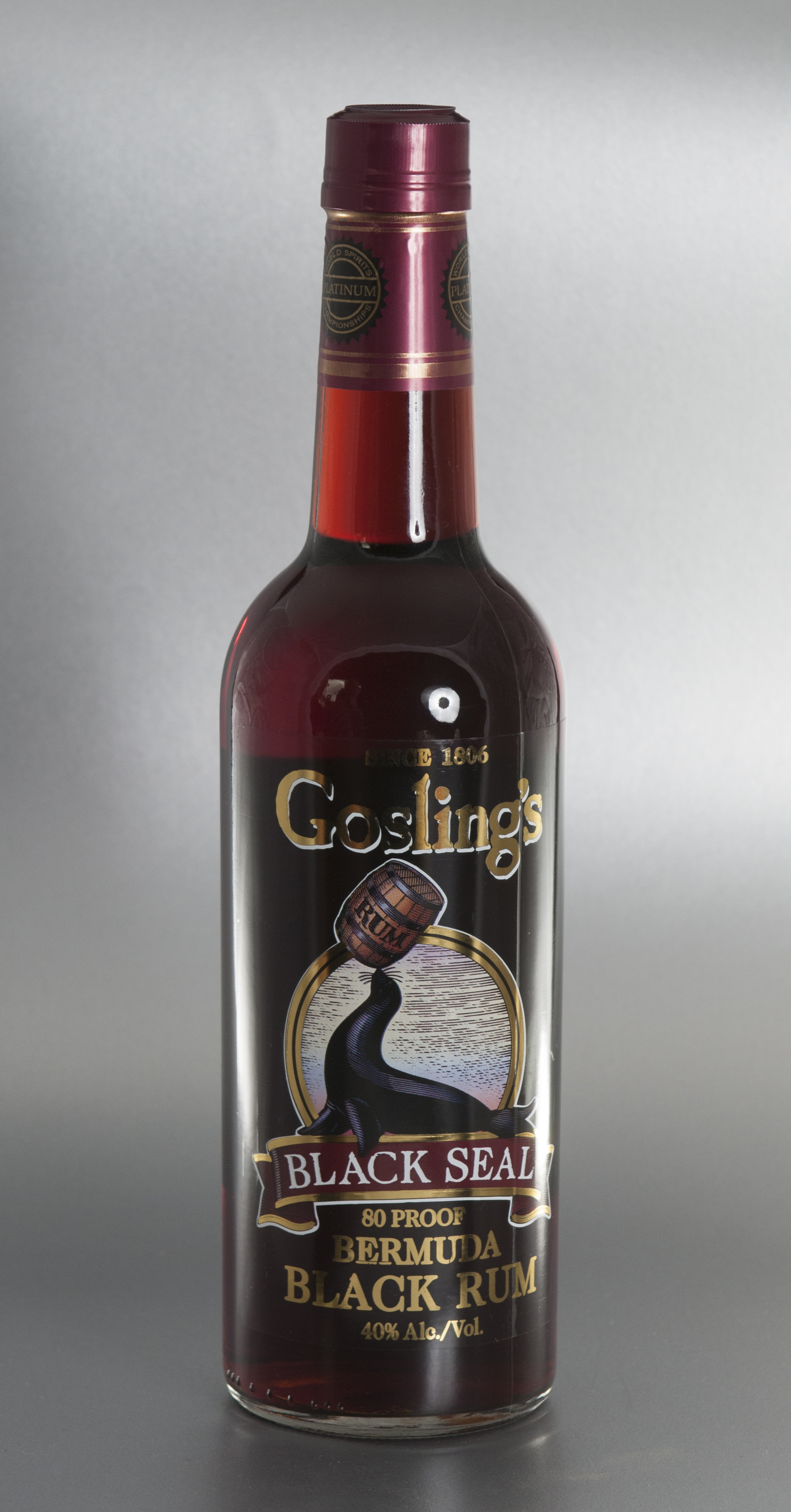
A bottle of Black Seal Rum

- Black Seal Rum – Gosling's flagship 80 proof Bermuda Black Rum. This is the rum that is mixed with Bermuda ginger beer to create the signature Dark 'N' Stormy drink. The company also bottles 140 proof and 151 proof renditions of Black Seal Rum.
- Gold Rum – Gosling's amber rum offering, with lighter color and flavor profile than Black Seal.
- Old Rum – Also called "Gosling's Family Reserve", this is a Bermuda black rum made of the same blend used for Black Seal rum. However, it is aged longer and specially packaged. This rum is designed to be enjoyed on its own.
- Stormy Ginger Beer – A ginger beer taking inspiration from locally made brews and meant to be the second ingredient in a Dark 'N' Stormy (displacing John Barritt & Son Ltd.'s Bermuda Stone Gingerbear).

== See also ==
- List of rum producers
