= Jefferson's Bourbon =

Brand of Bourbon Whiskey

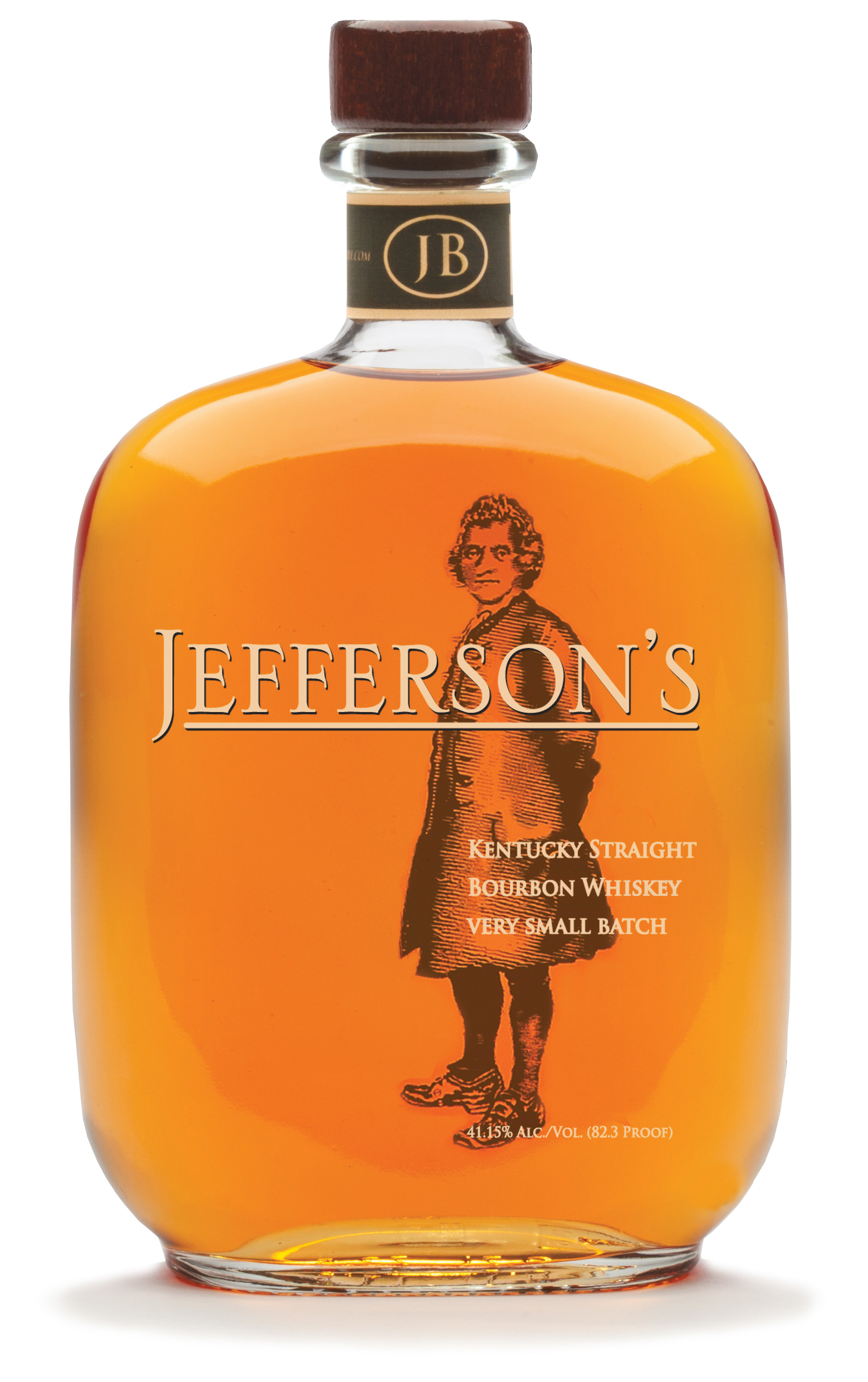
- Jefferson's Small Batch Bourbon
- Type: bourbon, rye
- Manufacturer: Kentucky Artisan Distillery, independent distilleries
- Distributor: Castle Brands
- Origin: United States, Kentucky
- Introduced: 1997
- Alcohol by volume: 40%
- Variants: Jefferson's Small Batch, Jefferson's Reserve, Jefferson's Presidential, Jefferson's Ocean, Jefferson's Collaboration, Jefferson's Rye
- Website: jeffersonsbourbon.com

Jefferson's Bourbon is a Louisville, Kentucky–based brand of bourbon whiskey. The brand was first released in 1997, and is distributed by the Castle Brands.

Jefferson's has used experimental blending and aging techniques, such as aging bourbon at sea, where wave action can affect the product's development. It also produces a rye whiskey.

The Jefferson's brand was initially applied exclusively to bourbon distilled by other companies. Jefferson's acquired Kentucky Artisan Distillery in Crestwood, Kentucky. 25% of barrels warehoused for aging in 2017 were produced at Kentucky Artisan Distillery. The other 75% are produced by independent distilleries.

== History ==
Jefferson's Bourbon was launched in 1997 by Trey Zoeller, a native Kentuckian, and his father Chet Zoeller, a bourbon historian. He founded a company called McClain & Kyne after Zoeller's past relatives, including an 8th generation grandmother arrested in 1799 for moonshining. McClain & Kyne was purchased by Castle Brands around 2005. Asked about the name, Zoeller reportedly said, "I had no marketing budget. I simply wanted a recognizable face associated with history and tradition."

In June 2015, Castle Brands announced a 20% purchase of Copperhead Distillery Company, which owns and operates Kentucky Artisan Distillery.

In 2022, Pernod Ricard announced an investment of $250 million for Jefferson's Bourbon to build a new, carbon-neutral distillery and aging warehouses in Marion County, Kentucky.

== Production ==
In addition to conventional bourbons, ryes, and whiskeys, other products include:

- Jefferson's Ocean (45% ABV), which was initially an experimental bottling before being made a standard offering. Barrels of bourbon aged 6–7 years are loaded onto ships, which then sail around the world for six months, a process that Jefferson's claims develops the bourbon more quickly through the motion of the waves. Temperature swings also cause the barrels to expand and contract- the distiller claims this expedites maturation of the spirit.
- Jefferson's Collaboration (41% ABV) was blended in collaboration with chef Edward Lee to pair well with food.

== Reviews ==
Jefferson's Small Batch Bourbon and Jefferson's Reserve received a 92 and 94 respectively from the Beverage Tasting Institute in 2012. Jefferson's Rye received a 92 from Wine Enthusiast in 2012.

Food critic Morgan Murphy said "The dark amber of this bourbon makes it look like woodpile water, but the sweet caramel taste has a very restrained oak flavor."

== See also ==
- Bourbon whiskey brands
