= Chartreuse swizzle =

Cocktail with Chartreuse, Falernum, pineapple juice, and lime juice

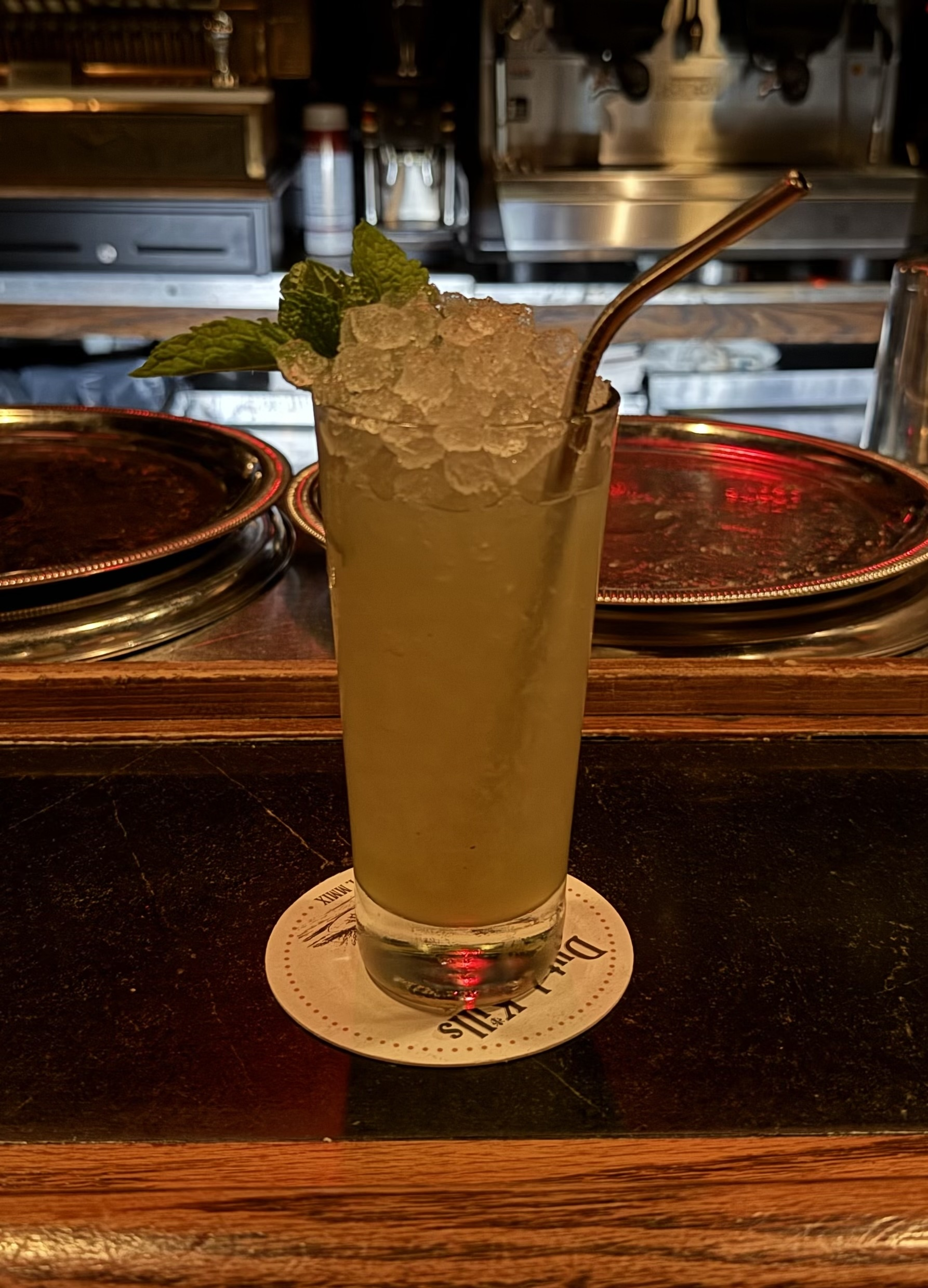
- Type: Cocktail
- Ingredients: 45 mL green Chartreuse; 30 mL pineapple juice; 22.5 mL lime juice; 15 mL falernum
- Standard drinkware: Collins glass
- Standard garnish: Mint leaves; grated nutmeg
- Served: On the rocks
- Preparation: Pour ingredients into the glass, add pebble ice, and stir with a swizzle stick or cocktail spoon. Top up with pebble ice and garnish.

The Chartreuse swizzle is a tiki cocktail made with green Chartreuse, velvet falernum, pineapple juice, and lime juice. Invented in 2003 by American bartender Marcovaldo Dionysos of San Francisco cocktail bar Harry Denton's Starlight Room, the cocktail has since emerged as a modern classic. It has been recognized by the International Bartenders Association as an official cocktail since 2024.

== History ==
San Francisco bartender Marcovaldo Dionysos invented the Chartreuse swizzle in 2003. Dionysos had participated in a Chartreuse-sponsored cocktail competition each year since 1999, placing among the top three finalists for four years in a row. He was hesitant to participate in the 2003 competition until an organizer encouraged him to return; as a result, he devised the Chartreuse swizzle, which went on to win him first place and a Fuji mountain bike as a prize.

Chartreuse had become popular among San Francisco bartenders in the early-2000s craft cocktail movement, but it was uncommonly seen in tiki cocktails. Dionysos had remembered reading about velvet falernum, an obscure ingredient at the time, and was inspired to combine the two ingredients into a tropical cocktail. He also took inspiration from other, typically rum-based "swizzle" drinks, which are mixed with a swizzle stick to achieve a uniform dilution and slightly frothy texture.

After the Chartreuse swizzle won the competition, Dionysos added the drink to the menu at Harry Denton's Starlight Room, the bar where he worked at the time. There, it was well-received, but it did not attract national attention until 2008, when it was added to the menu at celebrity chef Michael Mina's San Francisco restaurant Clock Bar. On the restaurant's opening night, Mina asked Dionysos, who had been tapped as bar manager, for a Grey Goose on the rocks, but Dionysos instead presented him with a Chartreuse swizzle; the cocktail immediately won over Mina and the restaurant's beverage manager, and it soon appeared on the menu. The cocktail proceeded to appear on menus at Mina's restaurants all around the world, contributing to its rapid international rise by 2010.

Along with the Last Word, the Chartreuse swizzle has been credited for a resurgence of popularity and sales for Chartreuse in the early 2000s.

== Reception ==
In a 2021 article for Robb Report, Jason O'Bryan wrote: "If there were a Nobel Prize for cocktails, Marcovaldo Dionysos would win one for this. As a drink, it's novel to the point of being avant-garde, yet brilliant in its simplicity." He called Chartreuse a "crazy choice" for a base spirit, adding, "The Carthusian monks, inventing Chartreuse in the snowy French Alps in 1737, had probably never even seen a pineapple, but nevertheless, pineapple juice and Chartreuse go fabulously together."

A recipe by Robert Simonson in The Washington Post describes the cocktail as "bright, complex, and startling," noting that Dionysos credits the drink's success "to its simplicity (just four ingredients) and the growing popularity of both Chartreuse and tiki cocktails."

== See also ==
- Last Word (cocktail)
- Rum swizzle
- List of cocktails
