= Robert Barritt =

Bermudian artist, painter and politician

Robert Vaughan Barritt

Member of the House of Assembly of Bermuda
- In office 1985–1989
- Constituency: Pembroke East Central

Minister of Community and Cultural Affairs

Personal details
- Born: c. 1927
- Died: June 21, 2015
- Party: United Bermuda Party
- Occupation: Artist, painter, politician

Robert Vaughan Barritt (c. 1927 – June 21, 2015) was a Bermudian artist, painter and politician. He served in the House of Assembly of Bermuda from 1985 to 1989 representing Pembroke East Central, marking the only time that the United Bermuda Party (UBP) held that particular constituency. Barritt held the post of Minister of Community and Cultural Affairs during his tenure in the House of Assembly. Barritt was later appointed to the Senate of Bermuda as a member of the UBP. He was a member of the Barritts, a prominent Bermudian political and business family which owns Barritt's Ginger Beer.

== Biography ==
Barritt attended MSA and the Saltus Grammar School in Hamilton, Bermuda. He moved to New Brunswick, Canada, to study fine arts at Mount Allison University in Sackville. In 1950, Barritt returned to Bermuda to take a position at his family's ginger beer business, John Barritt & Son Ltd. However, he continued to paint, specialising in oil paintings. Many of his paintings focused on Bermuda's Civil Rights Movement.

Barritt was one of a small group of white Bermudians who spoke out in favour of universal suffrage of the island. He joined an all-Afro-Bermudian basketball team to draw attention to desegregation efforts.

Despite his involvement in social issues, Barritt remained reluctant and "unsure" about politics. He did not join the United Bermuda Party (UBP) until 1972. In 1985, Barritt and fellow UBP candidate, Lawson Map, were elected to the House of Assembly of Bermuda from the Pembroke East Central constituency. The election marked the first, and only, time that the UBP held the Pembroke East Central seats in the House of Assembly. Barritt served in House of Assembly from 1985 until 1989.

Barritt also served as the Minister of Community and Cultural Affairs under Premier John Swan during his tenure in the Assembly. He was later appointed as a UBP member of the Senate of Bermuda.

Robert Barritt donated three of his paintings to the Bermuda National Gallery. His three works gifted to the National Gallery were; Theatre Boycott, Upstairs Right (1959), Two Weeks Before Christmas and Government House (1960), and Descent from the Cross (1961). When describing his paintings in 2008, Barritt said, "I'm a painter of the three R's. Not reading, writing and arithmetic. Rum, race and religion." Gary Phillips, Chairman of the Bermuda National Gallery, has described Barritt's as imbued with a "sense of 'equality, tolerance and peace'."

Robert Vaughn Barritt died on June 21, 2015, at the age of 88. He was predeceased by his late wife, Grace Elizabeth Barritt. Premier of Bermuda Michael Dunkley and former Premier John Swan paid tribute to Barritt following his death.
