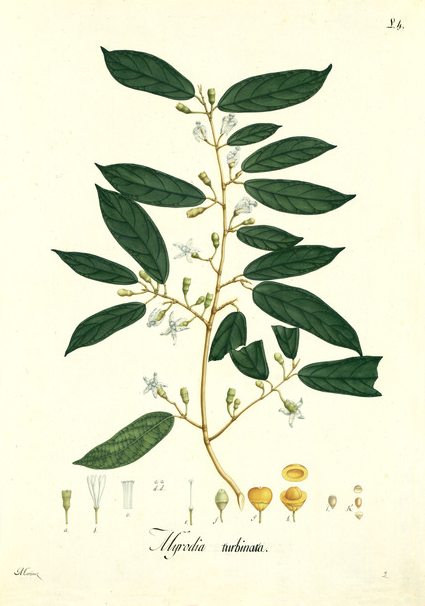
- Illustration of Quararibea turbinata

Scientific classification
- Kingdom: Plantae
- Clade: Tracheophytes
- Clade: Angiosperms
- Clade: Eudicots
- Clade: Rosids
- Order: Malvales
- Family: Malvaceae
- Genus: Quararibea
- Species: Q. turbinata

Binomial name
- Quararibea turbinata (Sw.) Poir.

= Quararibea turbinata =

Species of tree

Quararibea turbinata, also known as the swizzlestick tree, is an aromatic plant native to such Caribbean locales as Antigua, Barbados, Dominica, Grenada, Guadeloupe, Hispaniola, Martinique, Montserrat, Netherlands Antilles, Puerto Rico, St. Kitts and Nevis, St. Lucia, Saint Vincent and the Grenadines and the Virgin Islands. It is generally described as a perennial tree or shrub and its common name comes from its use as a swizzle stick and its association with cocktails such as the rum swizzle.

Native names include: asubillo, garrocha, garrocho, palo de garrocha, palo de percha
