= Buck (cocktail) =

Family of mixed drinks with ginger, citrus juice and liquor

- Type: Cocktail family
- Ingredients: ginger beer for a classic buck, deeper more complex cocktail, or ginger ale, for a neutral/sweet, dive bar style buck. Lime or other citrus juice
- Standard drinkware: Collins glass
- Standard garnish: Any common garnish may be used
- Served: On the rocks: poured over ice
- Preparation: May be mixed or muddled if mint, syrups, or fresh fruit is added; shaken vigorously with ice, then strained into the glass. Topped with ginger ale or ginger beer.

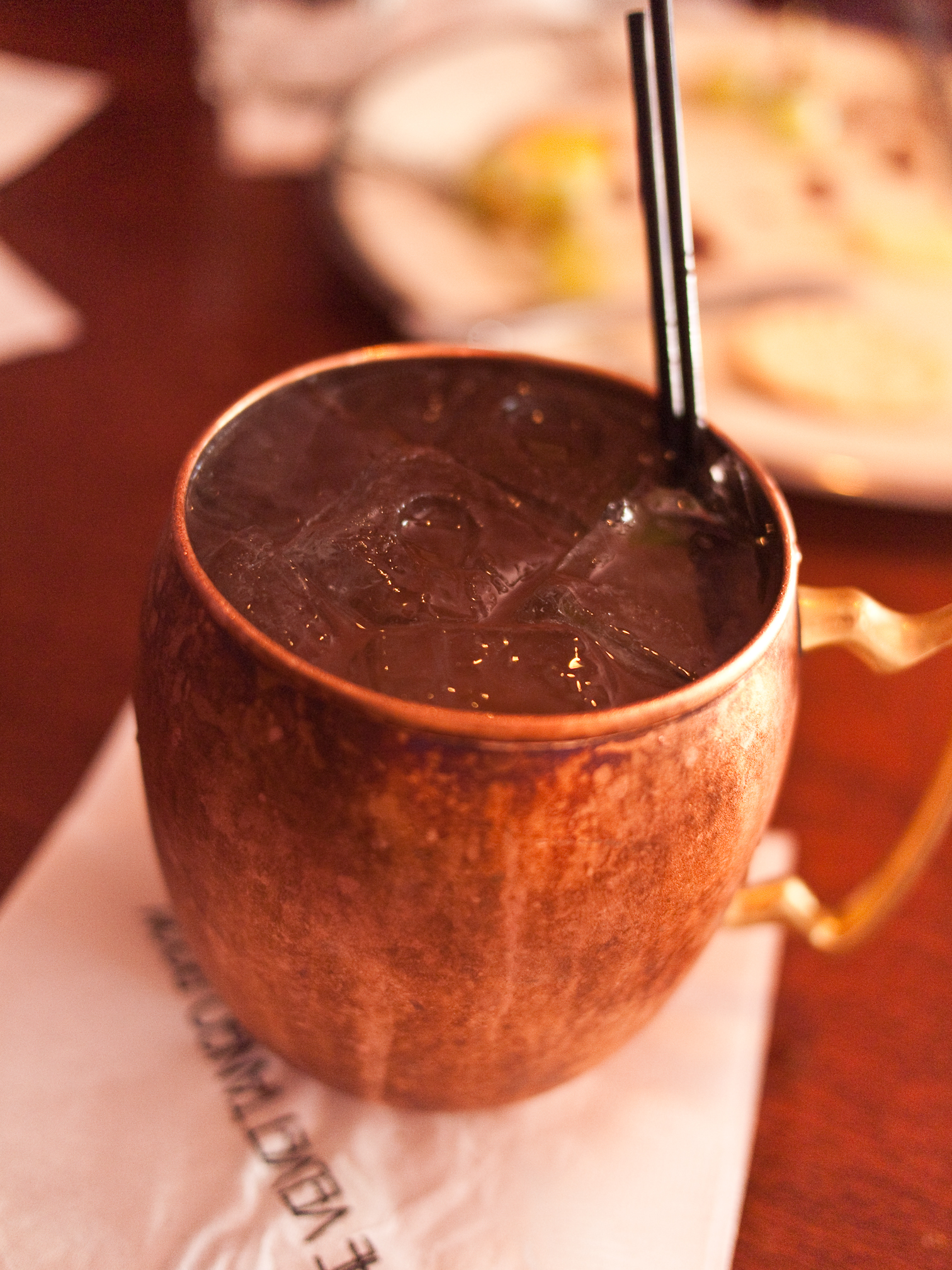
A Moscow mule, also known as a vodka buck

A buck is a cocktail that is made with ginger ale or ginger beer, citrus juice, and any of a number of base liquors. Buck cocktails are sometimes called "mules" due to the popularity of a vodka buck that is known as a Moscow mule.

== History ==
The buck is believed to have acquired its name when someone added a shot of whiskey to the previously nonalcoholic Horse's Neck, which consisted of ginger ale with lemon juice. The added alcohol gave the horse a "kick" – hence, a bucking horse.

== Variations ==
Variations include:

- Bourbon, rye, or whiskey buck
- Kentucky Buck, containing bourbon and strawberry
- Gin buck, containing gin; sometimes known as British Buck or London Buck
- Gin Gin Mule, containing gin and mint Also known as a Ginger Rogers (after the actress of the same name.)
- Irish buck, containing Irish whiskey
- Mamie Taylor, containing scotch whisky
- Rum buck, also called a Barbados buck or Jamaican buck to indicate the origin of the rum. Adding lime to a Dark 'n' Stormy creates a rum buck.
- Shanghai buck, made with light rum, and served at the Shanghai Club in the 1930s.
- Vodka buck, also known as a Moscow mule, invented in Los Angeles, California, US, and largely responsible for the popularity of vodka in the United States from the 1940s through 1960s.
- Chilcano, made with Pisco
- El Diablo, made with tequila, lime juice, and crème de cassis
- Variations using brandy and other liquors
- Addition of syrups, different types of juice, fresh ginger, mint, and various garnishes

== See also ==
- List of cocktails
