= Horse's neck =

Cocktail made with brandy and ginger ale

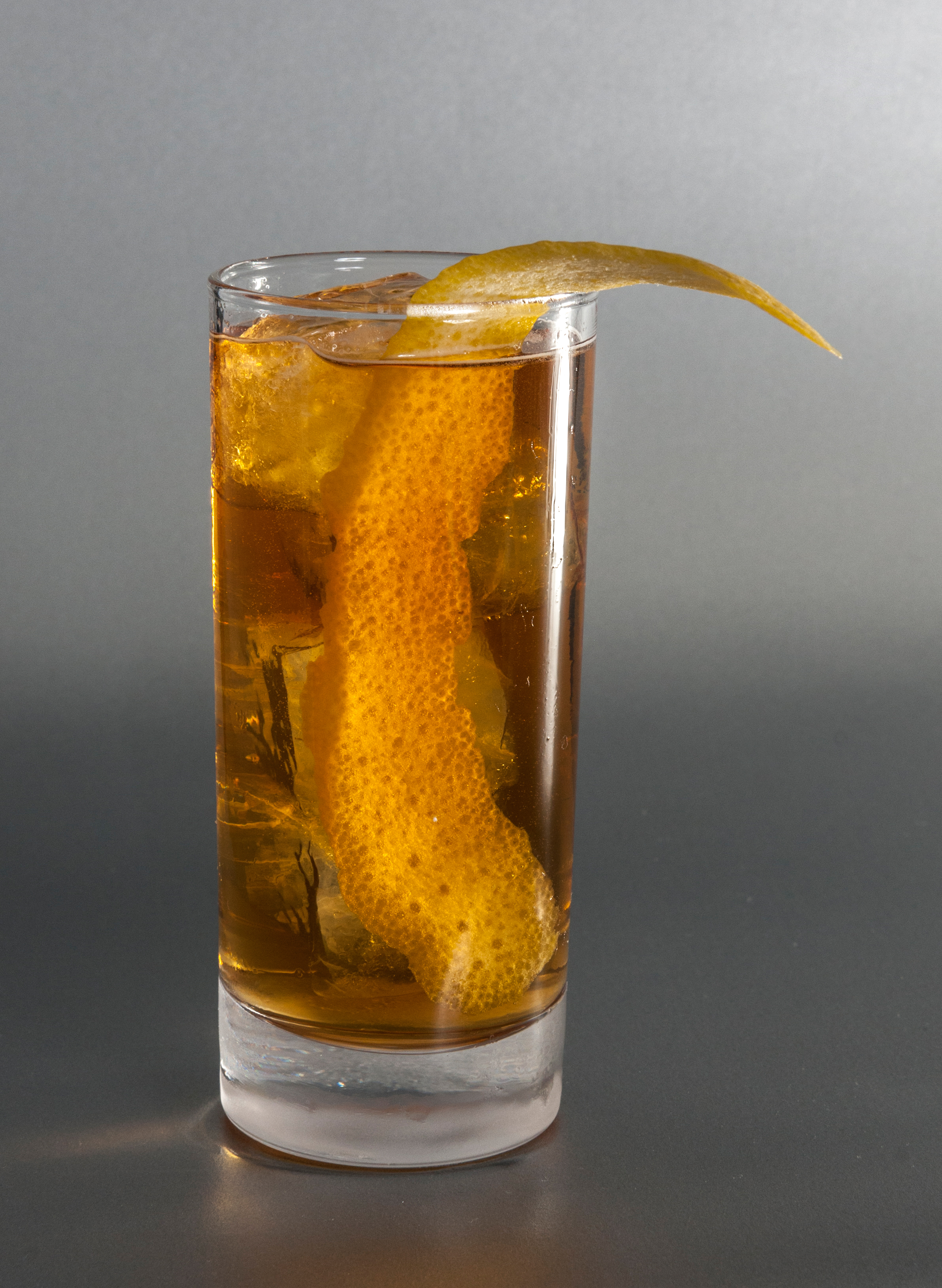
- Type: Highball
- Ingredients: 4 cL (1 part) Brandy; 12 cL (3 parts) Ginger ale; Dash of Angostura bitter (optional)
- Base spirit: Brandy
- Website: iba-world.com/horses-neck/
- Standard drinkware: Highball glass
- Standard garnish: Long spiral of lemon zest
- Served: On the rocks: poured over ice
- Preparation: Pour brandy and ginger ale directly into highball glass with ice cubes. Stir gently. Garnish with lemon zest. If desired, add dashes of Angostura Bitter.

A horse's neck is a cocktail recognised by the International Bartenders Association (IBA), identifiably sporting a long, curling strip of lemon rind.

== Mixture ==
It is made with brandy (or sometimes bourbon) and ginger ale, with a long spiral of lemon peel draped over the edge of an old fashioned glass or a highball glass. A similar Canadian drink, the rye and ginger, is made with Canadian whisky and ginger ale.

== History ==
Dating back to at least the 1900s, it was a non-alcoholic mixture of ginger ale, ice and lemon peel. By the 1910s, brandy, or bourbon would be added for a "horse's neck with a kick" or a "stiff horse's neck." The non-alcoholic version was still served in upstate New York in the late 1950s and early 60s, but eventually it was phased out. IBA classifies this drink as a long drink.

Franklin Roosevelt occasionally consumed this drink in its non-alcoholic form. According to the head of FDR's Secret Service personal protection detail, “Whenever he [the President] was in a gathering where there was prolonged drinking he would ask for a ‘horse’s neck,’ a drink made of ginger ale, lemon peel, and no alcohol.”

== Horse's neck in popular culture ==
In the 1934 film The Captain Hates the Sea, Alison Skipworth's character craves a horse's neck, when Fred Keating's character tries to stop her, she says, "...I'm a lone wolf and it's my night to howl" then tells the waiter "...be sure to add a big horse, Charley". The disgruntled bartender then takes a lemon and begins to peel it, muttering "...around, and around, and around, for that cock-eyed Horse's Neck."

In the 1935 musical film Top Hat, Madge (Helen Broderick) tries to order a drink in Italian but gives up and says "horse's neck".

In the 1935 film No Limit, starring George Formby as George Shuttleworth, George accidentally orders a horse's neck at the bar in the steam packet ferry en route to the Isle of Man. He originally tries to order a lemonade but becomes confused and begins to repeat the orders of other passengers in a bid to be noticed by the barman who is studiously ignoring George at the busy bar.

In the 1937 crime-adventure novel Challenge featuring gentleman adventurer Bull-Dog Drummond, Drummond's friend Algy Longworth – suffering from a hangover – requests a breakfast cocktail of his butler: "Beneath this outer husk, conditions are poor--very poor... I could do with a horse's neck."

The non-alcoholic version of the drink is referenced in at least two film noir movies from 1950: In a Lonely Place with Humphrey Bogart, in which Martha Stewart—playing the hat-check girl—states that adding a twist of lemon to ginger ale is called a "horse's neck"; and Outside the Wall, in which Dorothy Hart tells Richard Basehart the two ingredients that compose the cocktail.

The horse's neck became popular in the wardrooms of the Royal Navy in the 1960s, displacing pink gin as the officers' preferred drink. An early reference to this is made in the 1957 film Yangtse Incident, in which a naval officer is shown drinking a horse's neck in 1949. At naval cocktail parties (CTPs), it used to be served by the mess stewards ready-mixed in glass jugs, alongside similar jugs of mixed gin and tonic, with the request "H-N or G&T, sir?"

In the 1979 BBC TV spy thriller series Tinker, Tailor, Soldier, Spy, Alec Guinness's character (George Smiley) asks for a brandy and ginger ale in episode six.

In the 1983 British TV series Agatha Christie's Partners in Crime based on Christie's Tommy and Tuppence mysteries, in the episode "The Crackler", Tuppence is particularly eager to try a horse's neck, and drinks several. When the host orders it from the bartender, he refers to it as a "G and G".

At the end of the 1988 film Return of the Living Dead Part II, the character Doc Mandel asks the pre-teen character Jesse Wilson if he has ever had a horse's neck, to which he replies "No."

== See also ==
- Buck (cocktail)
- List of cocktails
- List of IBA official cocktails
