= Ron miel =

Type of rum

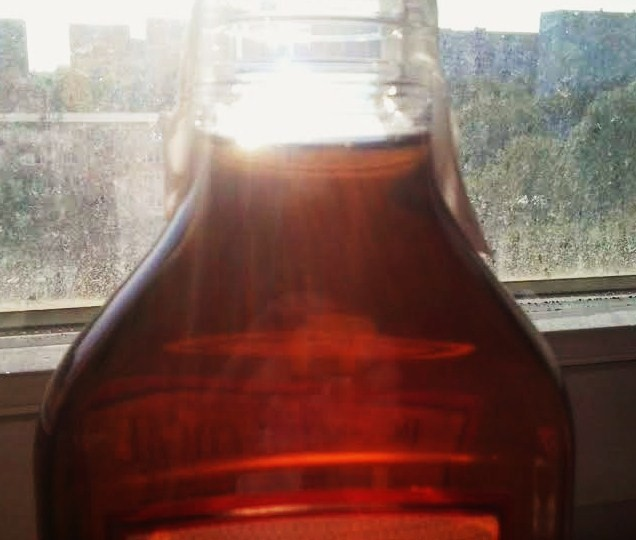
Ronmiel brought from Canary Islands to Poznań in Poland

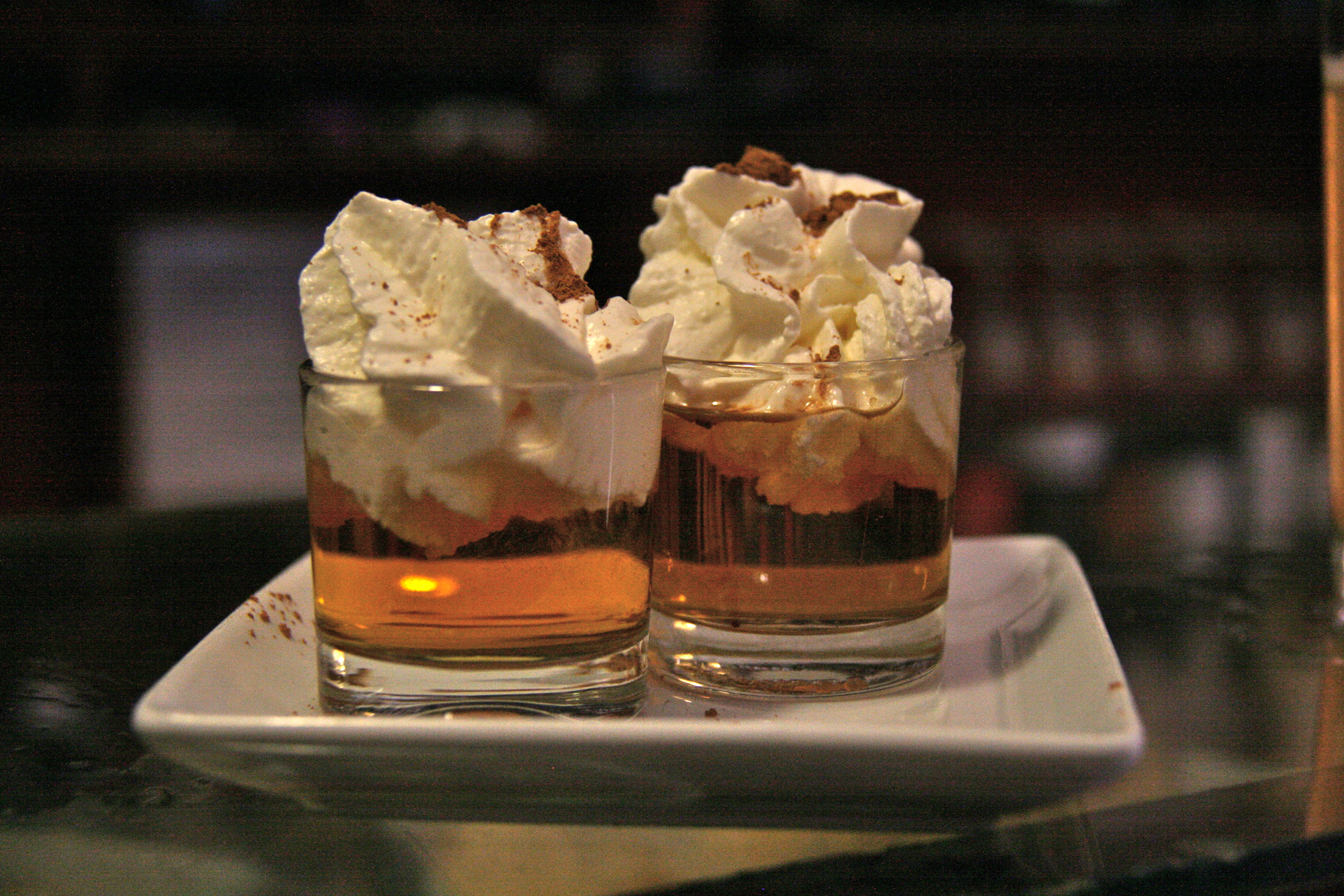
Shot of ron miel, covered with cream and cinnamon

Ron miel ("Honey rum") is a variety of rum made from liquor or cane molasses, typical from the Canary Islands. It is known as honey rum because the final product incorporates an amount of at least 2% honey of the total volume.

Its alcoholic graduation ranges from 20 to 45%. It is of intense and sweet flavor, and its color goes from the old gold to the intense mahogany. It's mostly consumed through shots, often with a sprinkle of lime juice.

In 2005 the Ministry of Agriculture of the Government of the Canary Islands created a specific Geographical Denomination for the honey rum under the name "Ronmiel de Canarias".
