= Pallini Limoncello =

Brand of Italian lemon-flavored liqueur

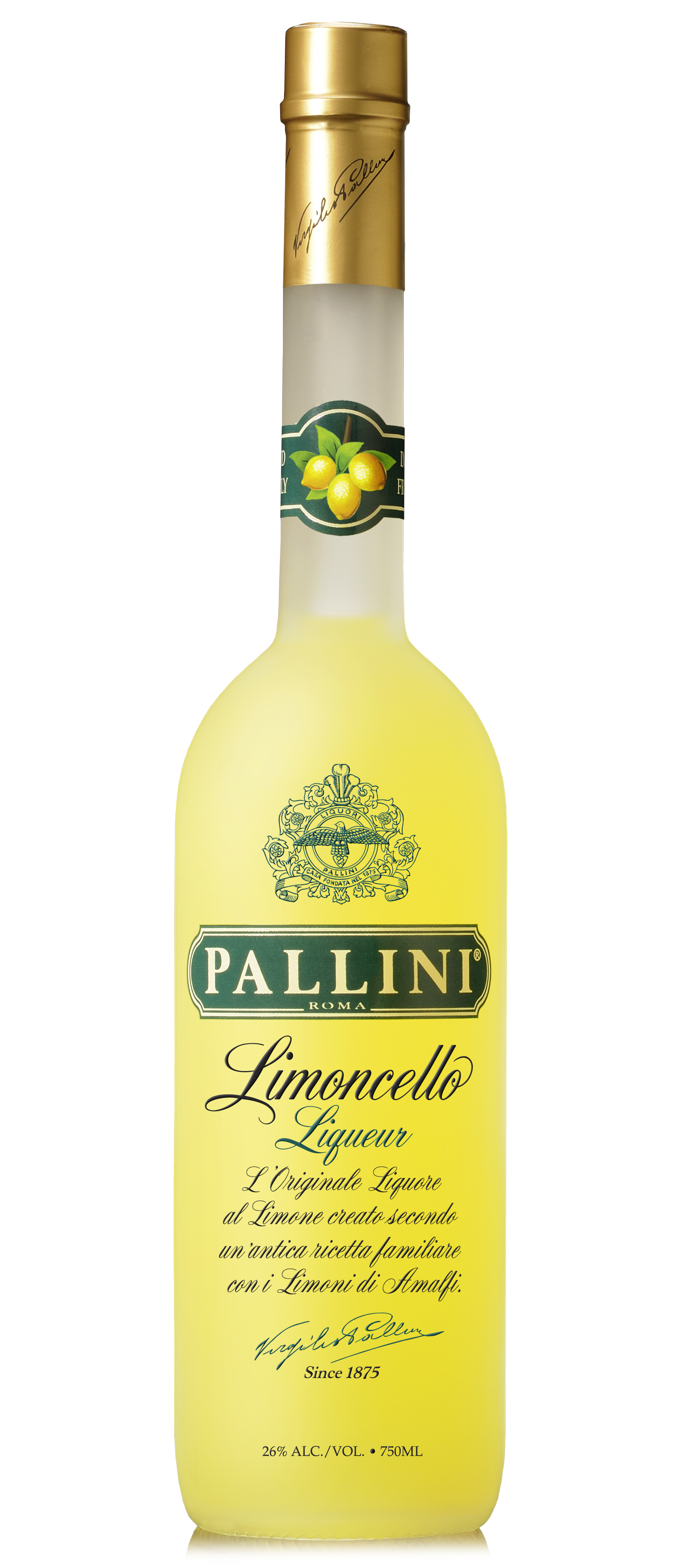
- Manufacturer: Pallini S.p.A.
- Origin: Rome, Italy
- Introduced: 1999
- Alcohol by volume: 26.0%
- Proof (US): 52

Pallini Limoncello is a brand of traditional Italian Limoncello.

== History ==
Pallini's Limoncello was introduced in 1999.

== Description ==
Pallini Limoncello is based on a 100-year-old Pallini family recipe. It is 26% ABV or 52 proof liqueur.

Pallini Limoncello is made using sfusato lemons grown on the Amalfi Coast of Italy. The lemons are handpicked, peeled, and shipped to the production facility in Rome, where the lemon zest is steeped in neutral alcohol derived from sugar beets. This infusion process releases the oils in the zest into the alcohol, which imparts the lemon flavor. Beet sugar and E102 (Yellow 5) is then added to the infused alcohol, and it is bottled and shipped worldwide.

Pallini Limoncello is produced by Pallini S.p.A., a family-owned and operated beverage company based in Rome, Italy.

== Flavours ==
- Limoncello – traditional lemon-flavoured Italian digestif
- Raspicello – liqueur made with a blend of raspberries, blueberries, cassis and black currants (26.0% alcohol by volume)
- Peachello – liqueur made with Italian white peaches (26.0% alcohol by volume)
