= Castle Brands =

Marketer of alcoholic beverage brands

- Traded as: AMEX: ROX (until 2019)
- Industry: Alcohol
- Founded: 1998
- Founder: Mark Andrews
- Fate: Acquired by Pernod Ricard

Castle Brands is a developer and international marketer of premium and super premium beverage alcohol brands. Its core spirits include rum, whiskey/bourbon and liqueurs, which are marketed and sold in the United States, Canada, Europe, Latin America and Asia.

The company has built its portfolio with both wide market and niche liquor products, including Jefferson's Presidential Collection whiskies. It distributes its products in all 50 states in the United States and the District of Columbia, in thirteen primary international markets, including Ireland, Great Britain, Northern Ireland, Germany, Canada, South Africa, Bulgaria, France, Russia, Finland, Norway, Sweden, China and the Duty Free markets, and in a number of other countries in continental Europe, Asia and Latin America.

== History ==
The company was founded in 1998 by Mark Andrews under the name Great Spirits LLC, through Mr. Andrews’ contribution of family-owned Knappogue Castle Irish Whiskey. Castle Brands Inc, was later established in 2003 and Great Spirits LLC was merged into Castle Brands. Between 2003 and 2006, Castle Brands acquired Roaring Water Bay Spirits, later acquired McLain & Kyne, established Gosling-Castle Partners and signed a distribution agreement with Pallini SpA. These four deals expanded the portfolio with Jefferson’s Bourbon, Boru Vodka, Clontarf Irish Whiskey, and Brady’s Irish Cream Liqueur and provided exclusive distribution rights to Gosling’s rums and Pallini Limoncello.

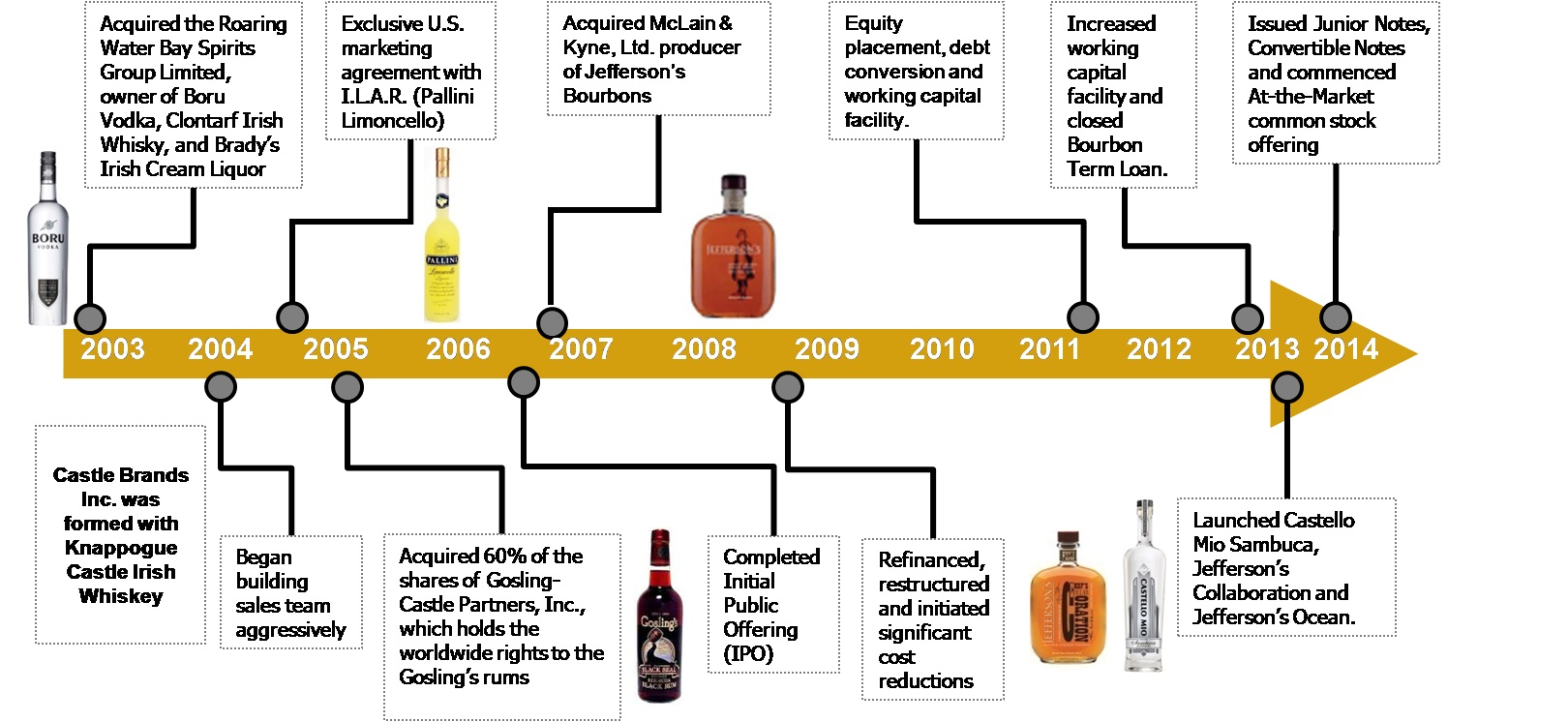
Timeline of Castle Brands' history since its founding in 1998, including IPO and multiple brand acquisitions.

Castle completed its IPO in April 2006, at $9.00 per share, and raised net $29.3 million on 3.5 million shares. Proceeds were used to fund product expansion with the October 2006 acquisition of McLain & Kyne as well as an increase in sales and marketing efforts. Additional private financing in later years allowed the company to add more product lines.

Since 2014, the company management focused on growing its current brands across four categories: rum, whiskey/bourbon, liqueurs and vodka.

In October 2019, the company was purchased by the French group Pernod Ricard, second worldwide producer of wines and spirits.

== Brands ==
Castle Brands’ current portfolio contains the following brands:

- Gosling’s Rum, Ginger Beer and Tonics
- Ramazzotti Liqueurs
- Mary Dowling Bourbon
- Method and Madness Irish Whiskey
- Mash & Mallow S'Mores Whiskey
