= Falernum =

Caribbean syrup used in drinks

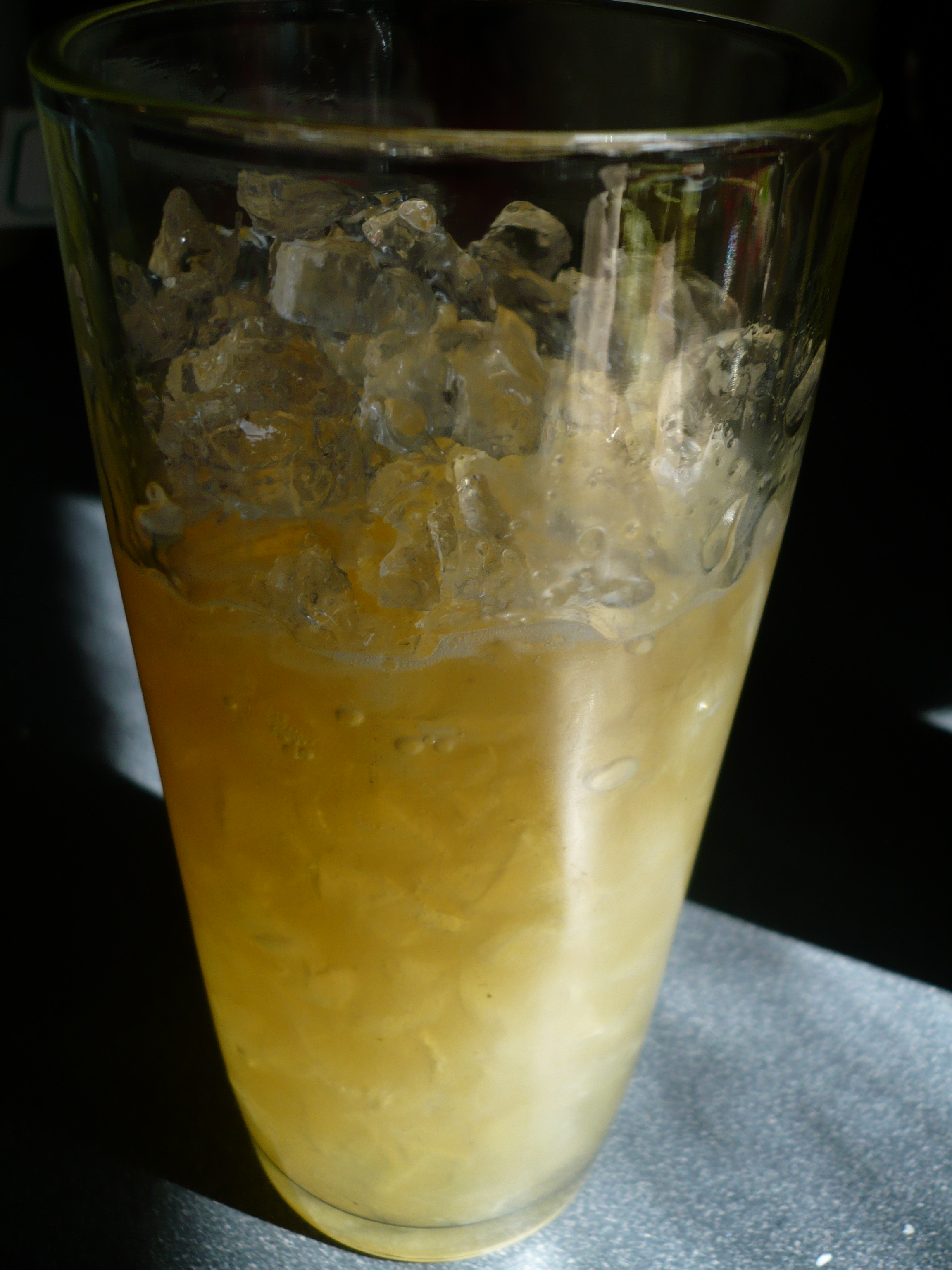
- Falernum and ice
- Type: Syrup liqueur or nonalcoholic syrup
- Origin: Caribbean, Barbados and Caribbean
- Alcohol by volume: 11% (syrup liqueur), varies for nonalcoholic syrup
- Color: White to light amber, clear or translucent
- Flavor: Ginger, lime, almond, cloves or allspice
- Related products: Orgeat syrup

Falernum (pronounced fə-LUR-nəm) is either a syrup liqueur or a nonalcoholic syrup from the Caribbean. It is best known for its use in tropical drinks. It contains flavors of ginger, lime, and almond, and frequently cloves or allspice. It may be thought of as a spicier version of orgeat syrup.

The form can be alcoholic (syrup liqueur) or nonalcoholic (syrup). Versions with alcohol are generally lower in proof (≈15% ABV), adding rum and emphasizing the clove, ginger, or allspice flavoring aspects for use in mixing cocktails, typically tropical or tiki drinks. It is also enjoyed on the rocks.

Depending on sugar content, the consistency is often thick and is therefore sometimes referred to as "velvet falernum" because of the feeling it leaves on one's tongue. Brands vary. The color can be white to light amber, and it may be clear or translucent.

== History ==
Falernum may date back to the 18th century, when it was made as a punch in the areas around Barbados. Some disagreement exists over the origin of the name, and whether the earliest versions would have included the steeping of almonds. The same references also assert that earlier versions contained bitters such as wormwood. The inclusion of bitters historically would seem to be corroborated by a 1982 article appearing in The New York Times.

In the literary magazine All the Year Round, owned by Charles Dickens Jr. at the time, an unnamed author wrote of falernum in 1892, describing it as "a curious liqueur composed from rum and lime-juice".

The earliest known reference in bar manuals seems to be the 1930s. One producer claims his recipe dates to 1890, winning awards as early as 1923.

== Use in cocktails ==
Drinks using falernum include:

- Better and Better
- Captain's Blood Cocktail
- Chartreuse swizzle
- Corn 'n Oil (Barbados)
- Frosty Dawn
- Key Cocktail
- Mai Tai (not Trader Vic's)
- Port Antonio Cocktail
- Puka Punch
- Royal Bermuda Cocktail
- Rum Collins (some variations)
- Bermuda Rum Swizzle
- Saturn Cocktail
- White Lion
- Zombie (Don the Beachcomber's)
- Test Pilot (including the Jet Pilot variant)
- Trader Sam's Uh-Oa!
- Tourist n’ Sugar
- Three Dots and a Dash

== See also ==
- Fassionola syrup
- List of syrups
- Orgeat syrup
