= Dark 'n' stormy =

Highball cocktail

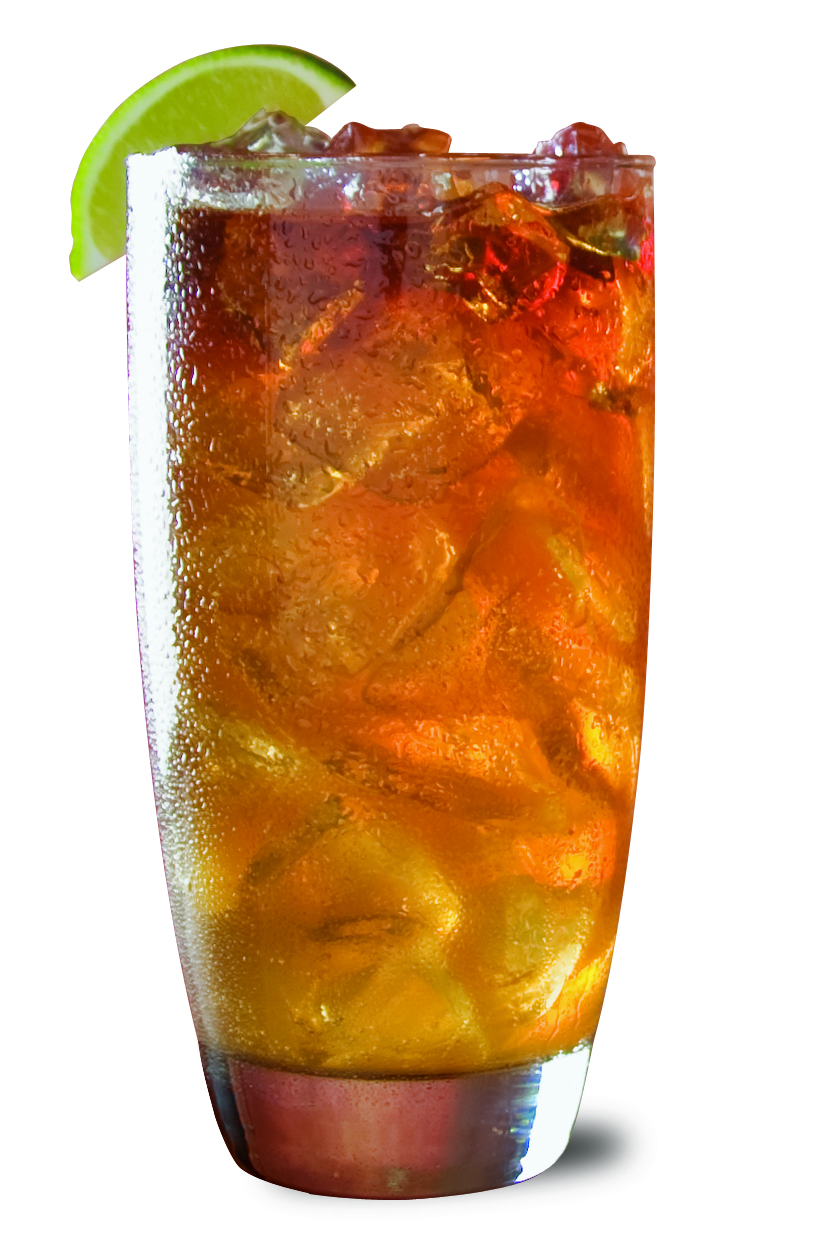
- Type: Mixed drink
- Ingredients: 60 ml Goslings Rum; 100 ml Ginger Beer
- Website: goslings.com/recipes/dark-n-stormy/
- Standard drinkware: Highball glass
- Standard garnish: Lime wedge
- Served: On the rocks: poured over ice
- Preparation: In a highball glass filled with ice pour the ginger beer and top floating with the Rum.

A dark 'n' stormy is a highball cocktail made with dark rum (the "dark") and ginger beer (the "stormy") served over ice and garnished with a slice of lime. Lime juice and simple syrup are also frequently added. This drink is very similar to the Moscow mule except that the Dark 'n' Stormy has dark rum instead of vodka. The original Dark 'n' Stormy was made with Gosling Black Seal rum and Barritt's Ginger Beer, but after the partnership between the two failed and the companies parted ways, Gosling Brothers created its own ginger beer.

Gosling Brothers claims that the drink was invented in Bermuda just after World War I.

== Trademark and litigation ==
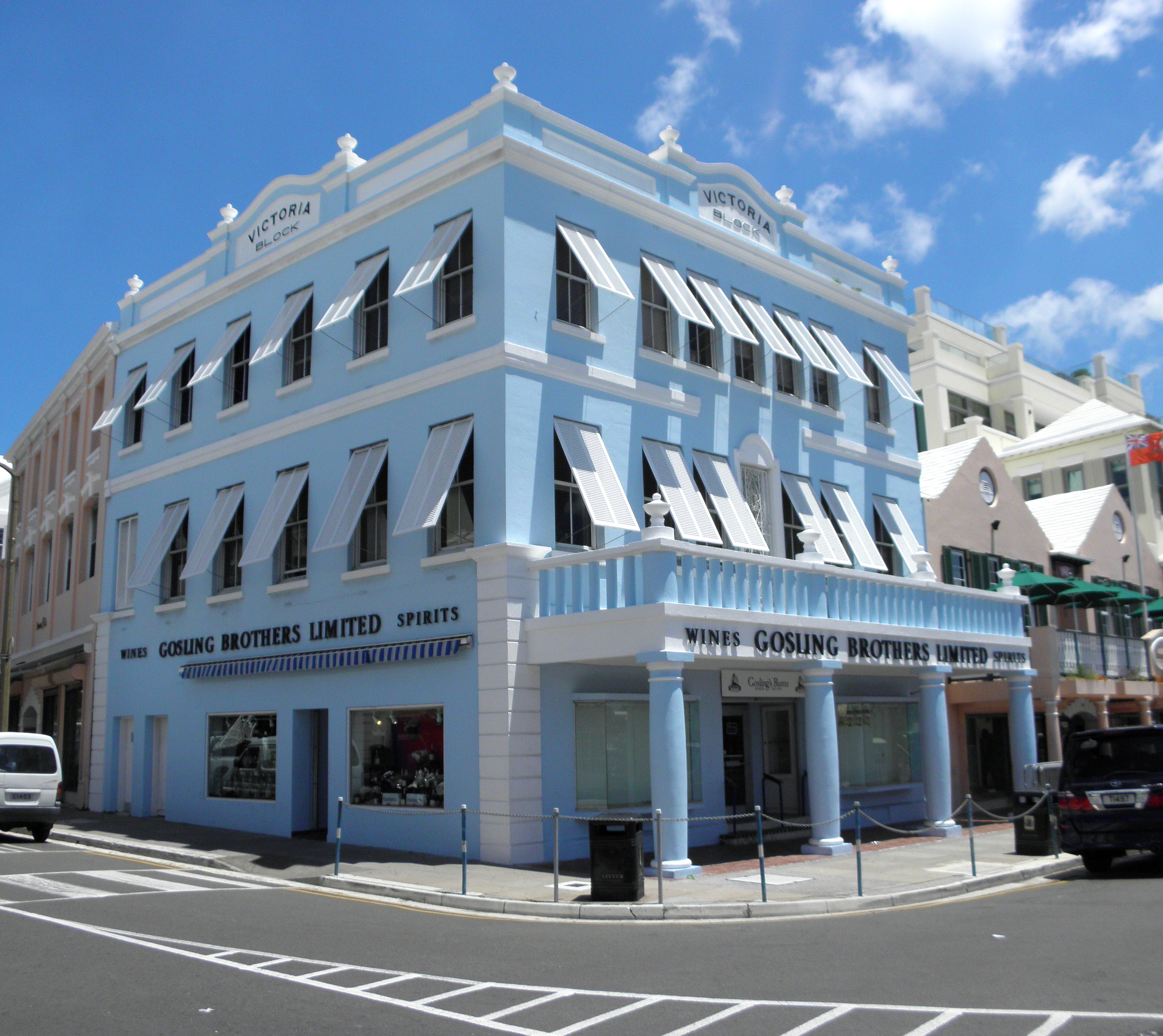
Gosling Brothers building in Bermuda.

Gosling Brothers has registered a version of the name that uses one apostrophe ('N), while the International Bartenders Association uses two apostrophes ('N').

In the United States, "Dark 'n Stormy" has been a registered trademark of Gosling Brothers Ltd of Bermuda since 1991. Gosling Brothers uses this registration to prohibit US marketing of a drink under the name "Dark 'n Stormy", or a related, confusing name, unless it is made with Gosling Black Seal rum. Gosling's has litigated or threatened litigation over the mark against Pernod Ricard, Proximo Spirits, Infinium Spirits' Zaya, and a cocktail blog.

Because of Gosling Brothers' threats of litigation, some sources use other variations on the name, such as "safe harbor", to offer similar drinks.

== Variations ==
A cider and stormy, or dark 'n' stormy cider, or dark and stormy orchard, is a mix of dark rum, apple cider, and ginger beer. The fall dark 'n' stormy contains bourbon, apple cider, lemon juice, and ginger beer.

== See also ==
Other trademarked cocktails include:

- Hand Grenade
- Painkiller
- Sazerac

Related cocktails:

- Buck (cocktail) (family of cocktails using ginger beer and lime; a dark 'n' stormy with lime juice may be called a rum buck)
