= Barritt's Ginger Beer =

Bermudan beverage brand

Barritt's
- Type: Ginger Beer
- Manufacturer: John Barritt & Son Ltd.
- Origin: Bermuda
- Introduced: 1874
- Color: Cloudy
- Variants: Diet Barritt's

Barritt's Ginger Beer is a brand of ginger beer produced in Bermuda by John Barritt & Son Ltd. The first small-batch ginger beer was made by William Barritt in Hamilton, Bermuda, in 1874. William's son, John, took over management in 1903. The company continues to be family owned after more than 150 years.

Barritt's is traditionally drunk on its own as a soft drink or as a mixer, famously half of the Dark 'N' Stormy cocktail.

Due to increased demand in the United States, Barritt's is now manufactured there by the North American Beverage Company.

== History ==
For the company's 150th anniversary in 2024, they released a new line of mixers.
