= Swizzle stick =

Small stick used to hold fruit garnishes or stir drinks

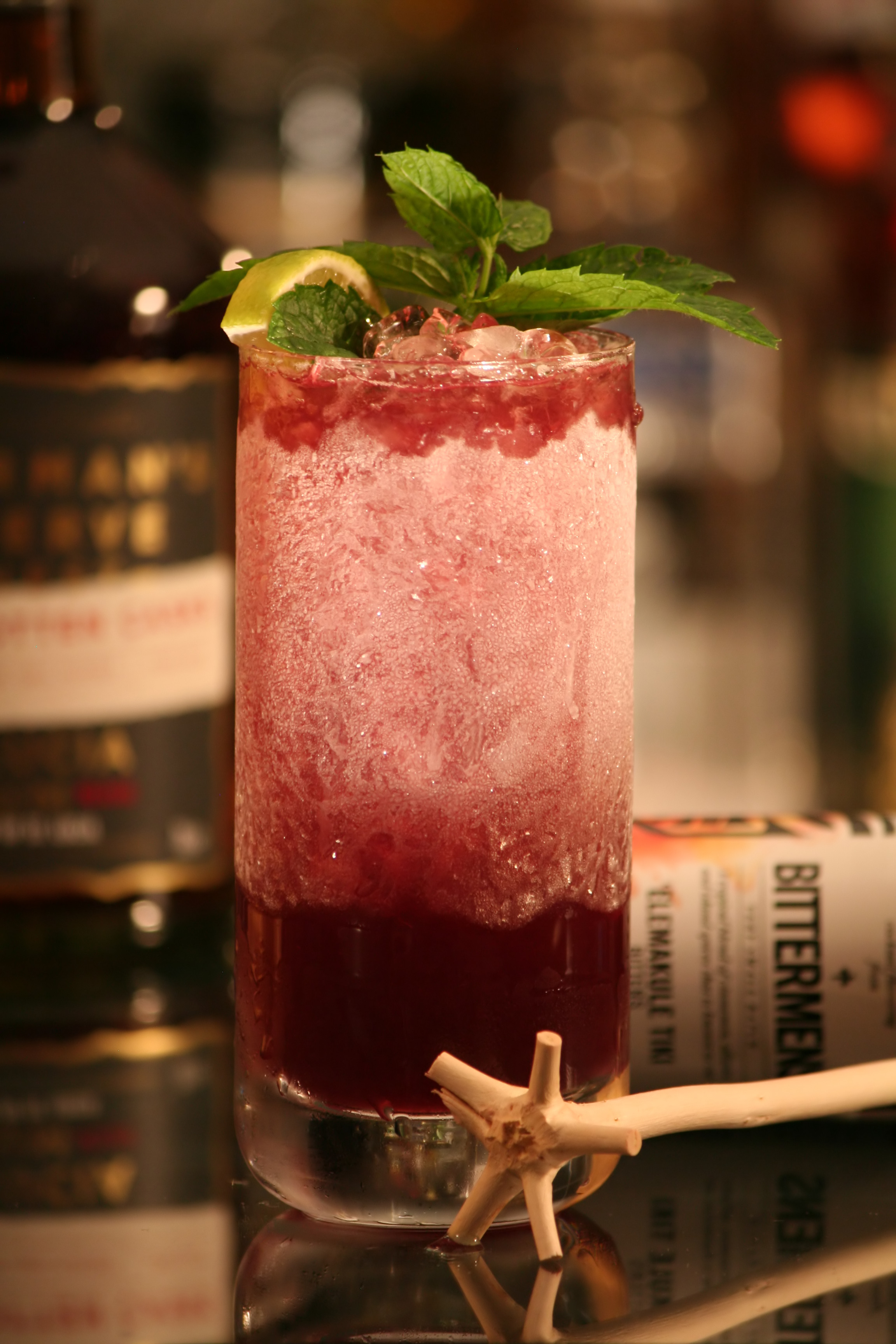
Traditional Quararibea turbinata swizzle stick lying in front of a rum-based cocktail (Sailors Swizzle)

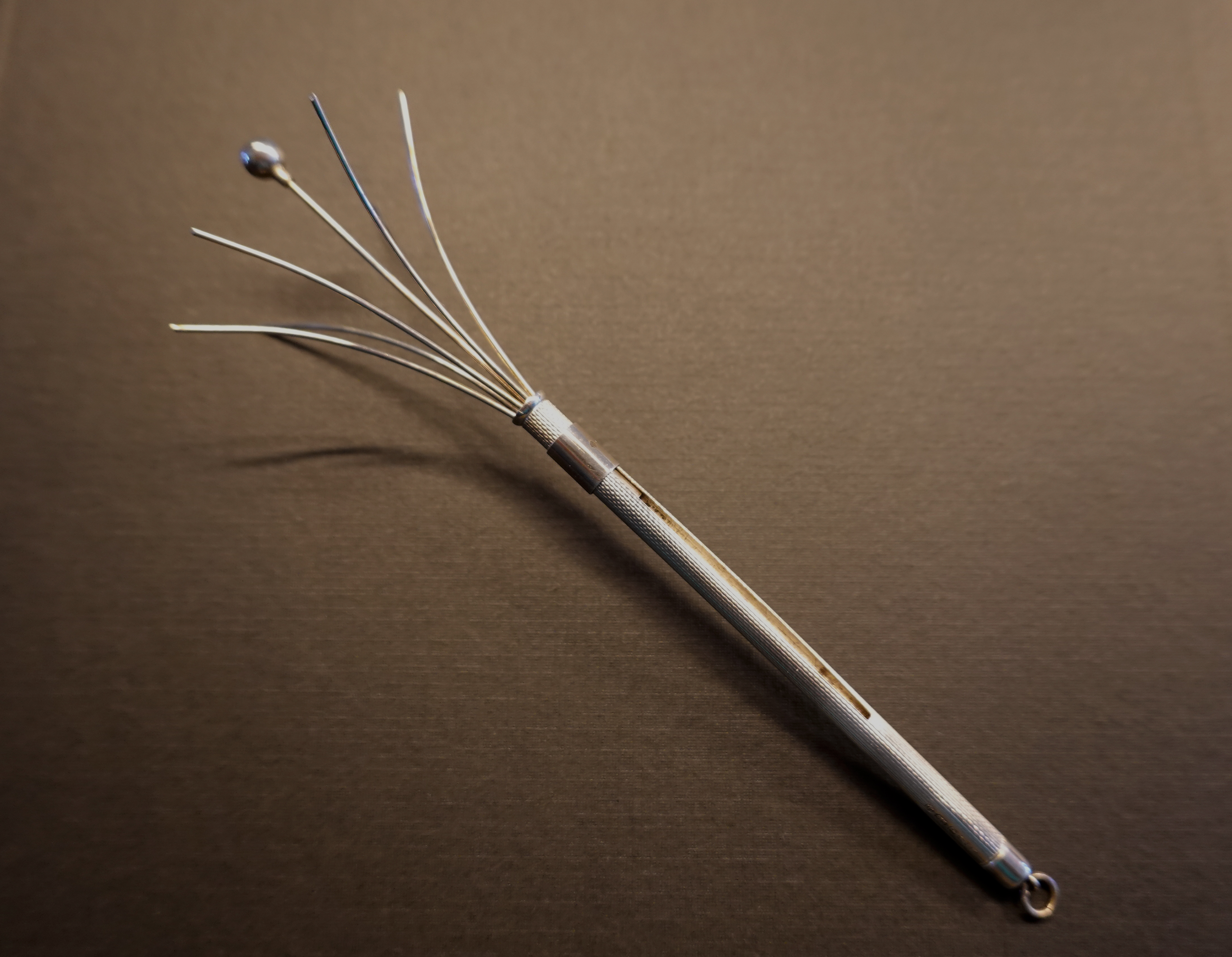
A small, silver, collapsible swizzle stick for champagne (German:Sektquirl)

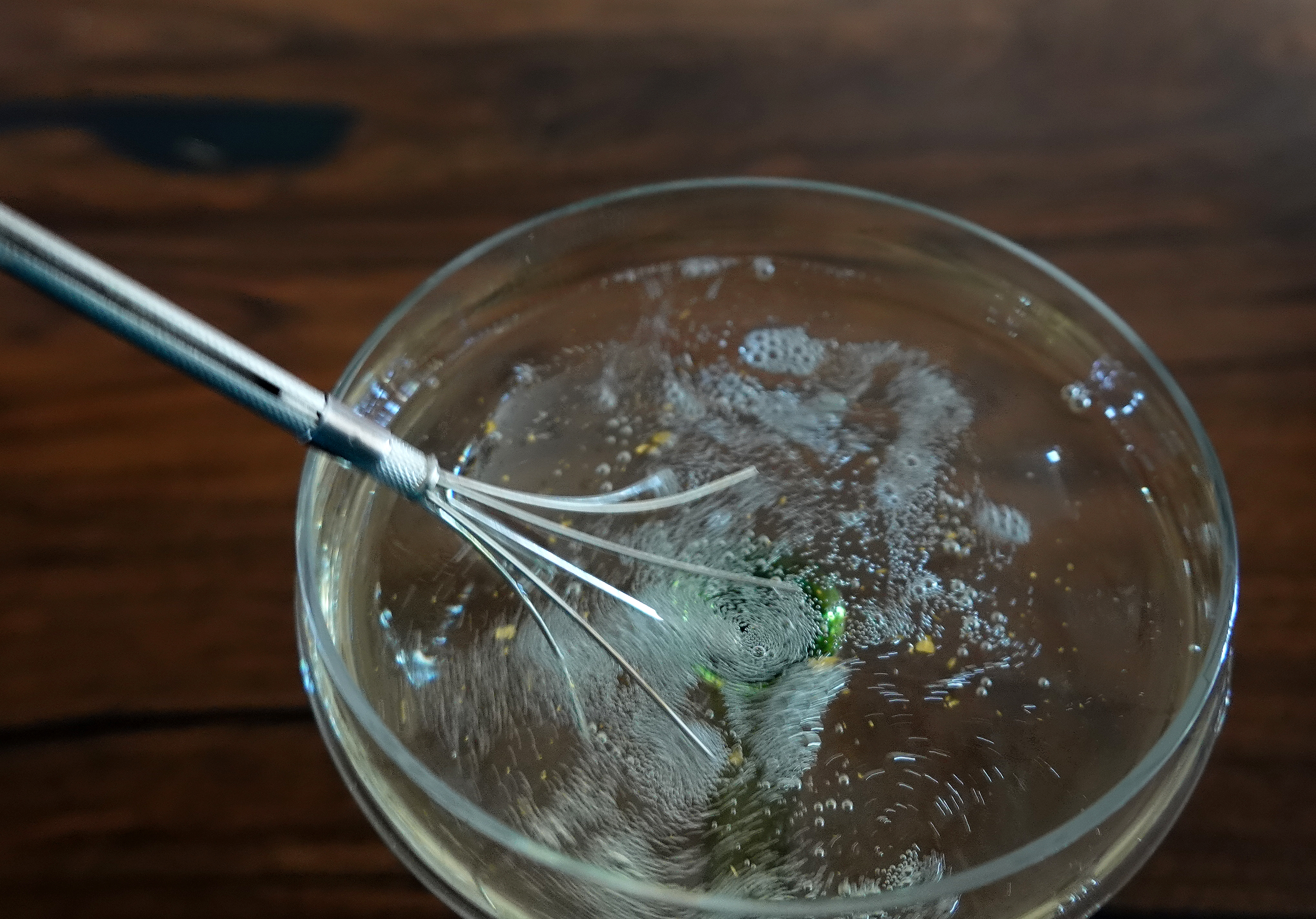
A small, silver, collapsible swizzle stick for champagne (German:Sektquirl)

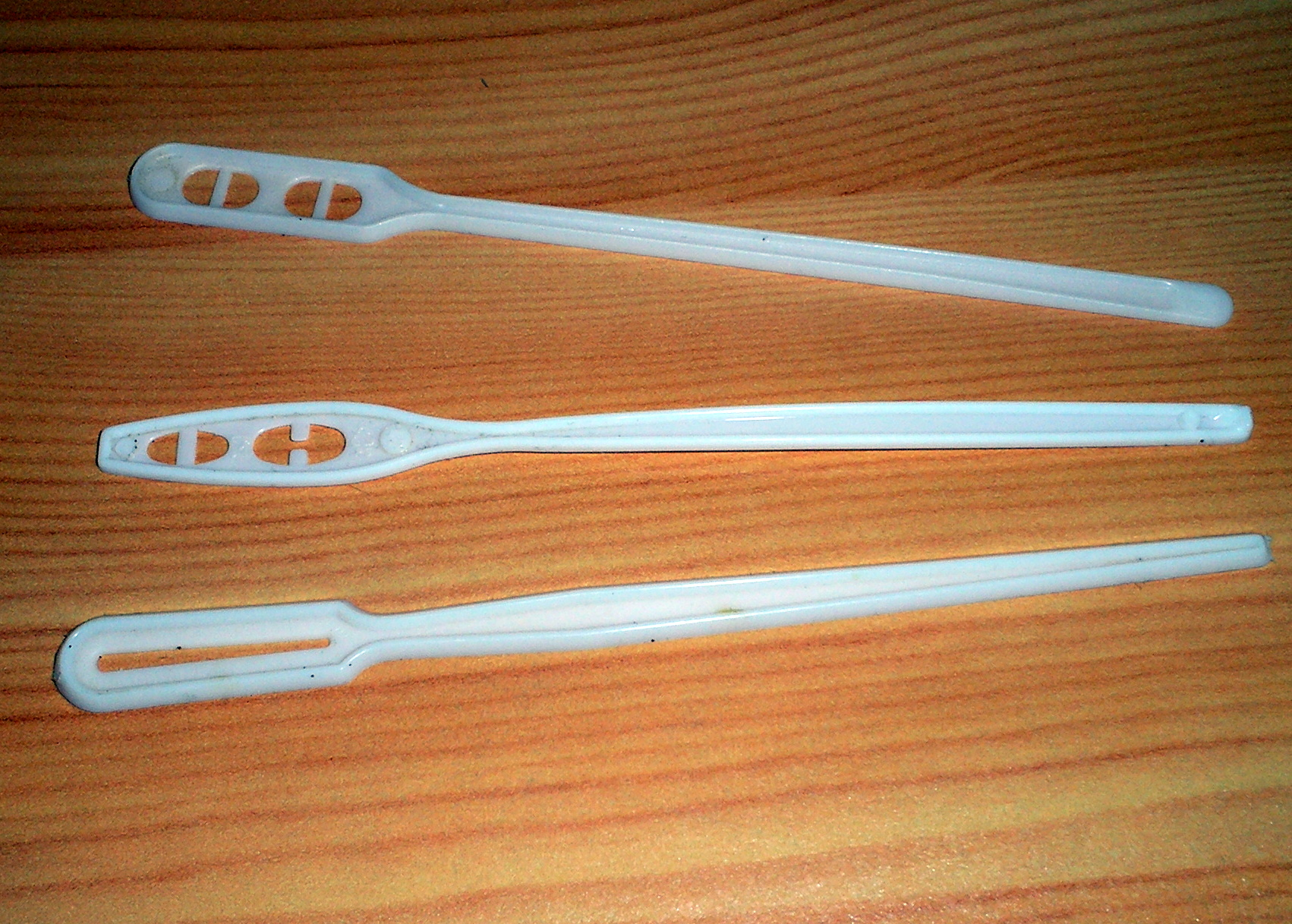
Three common coffee swizzle sticks (French: Touillettes)

A swizzle stick is a small stick used to stir drinks. The original swizzle sticks were created in the 18th century at a rum plantation in the West Indies using the branch of the Quararibea turbinata (also known as the "Swizzle stick tree"). In the late 19th and early 20th centuries, stir sticks made of glass or silver were created to shake out the bubbles from champagne, whose carbonation caused indigestion for some drinkers.

Swizzle sticks became particularly ornate with the advent of themed establishments such as the tiki bar and are sometimes kept as a souvenir or collected.

== See also ==
- Chartreuse swizzle
