= Jeff Berry (mixologist) =

American author and mixologist

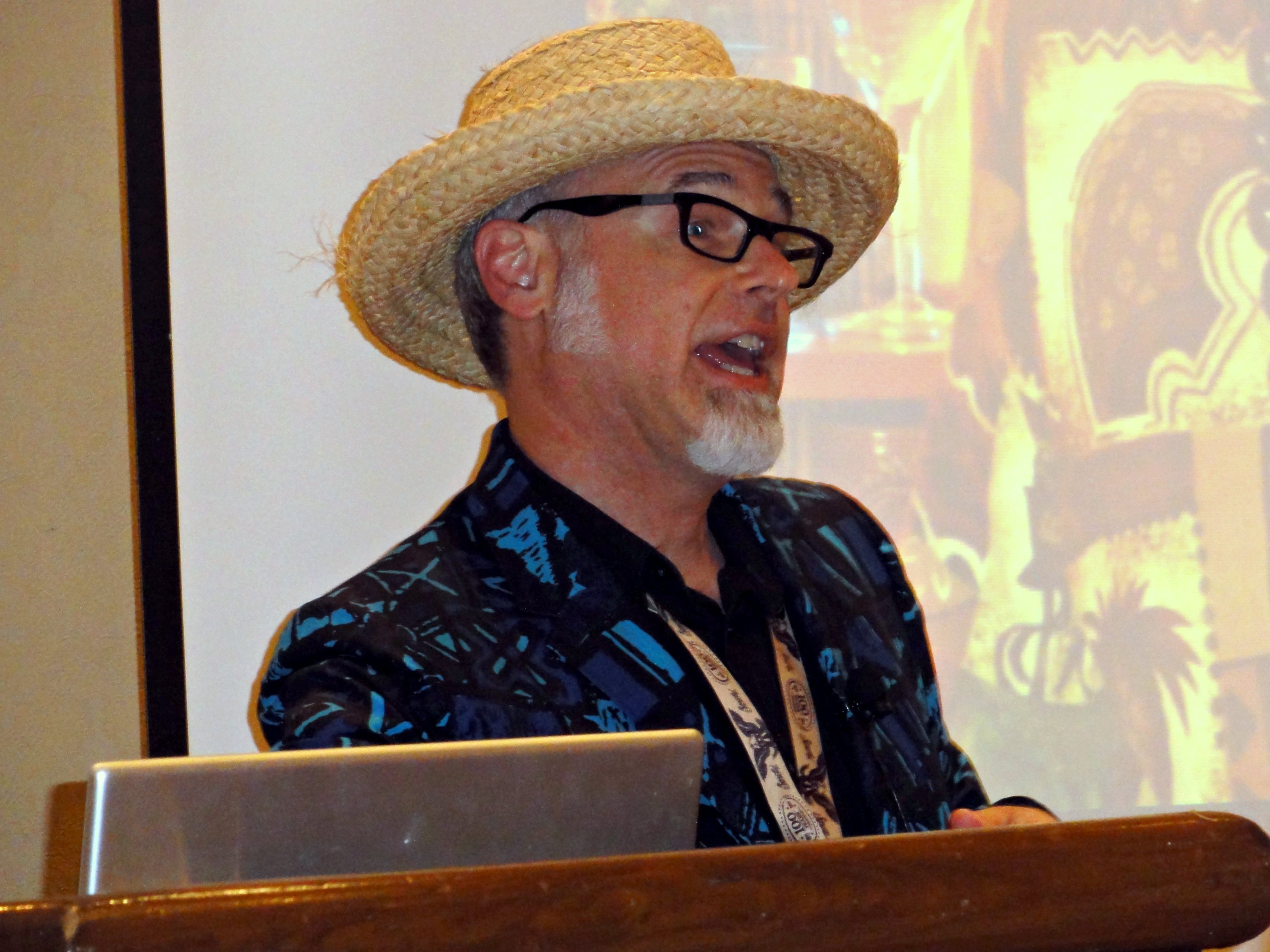
Berry speaks about the Mai Tai in 2011

Jeff "Beachbum" Berry (born c. 1958) is an American restaurant owner, author, and historian of tiki culture, particularly the drinks associated with the tiki theme. In addition to researching and reconstructing lost recipes, he has invented and published his own cocktail recipes.

== Career ==
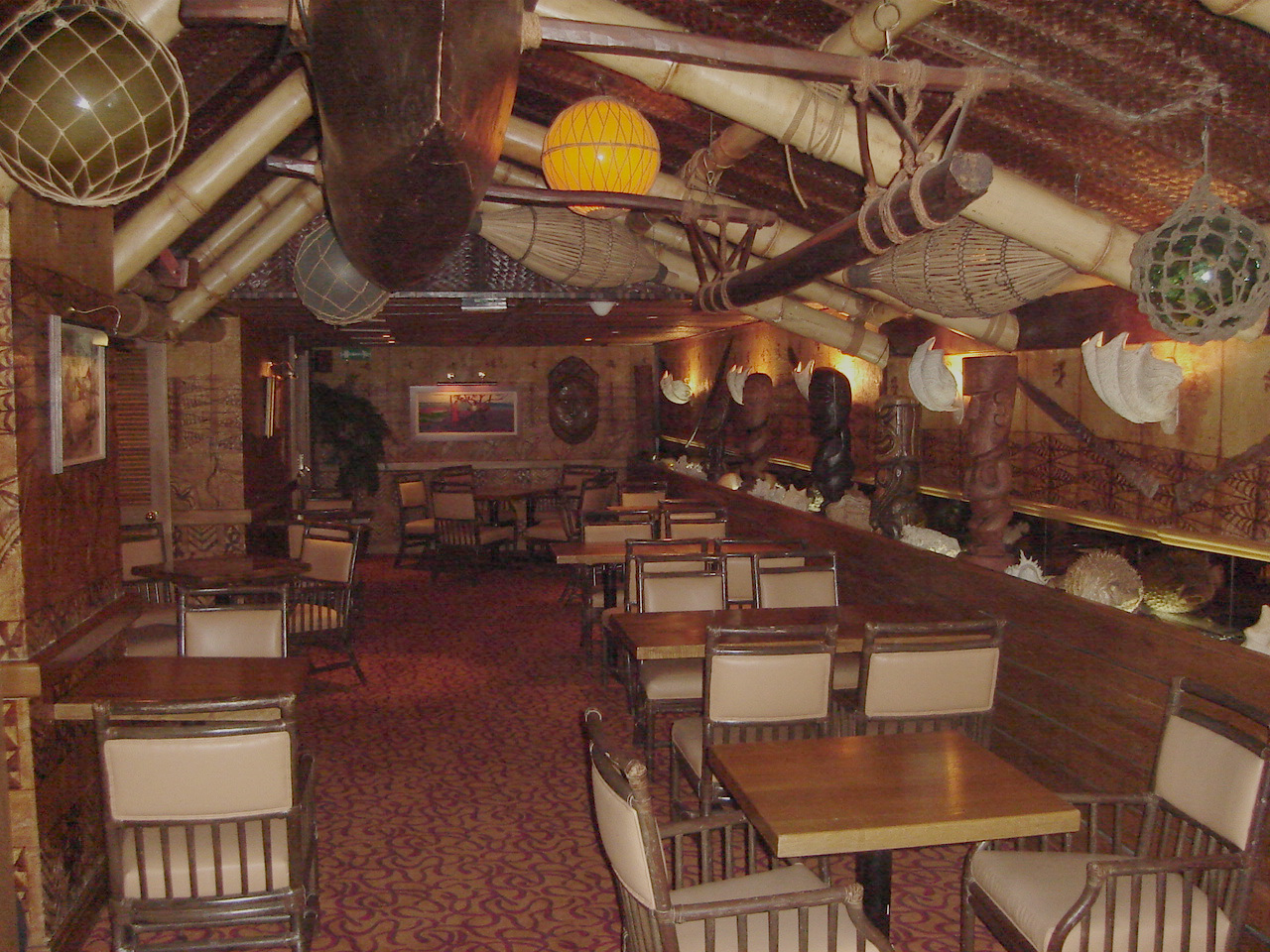
Typical tiki bar decor: Trader Vic's London

Berry describes himself as a "professional bum". He is a graduate of the UCLA film school, and he worked as a journalist and screenwriter in Hollywood for many years. He did several Disney rewrites and directed a TV movie starring Olympia Dukakis. But he came to realize that he "liked making drinks more than making movies" and decided to focus on his real passion: tropical drinks.

Berry fell in love with tiki culture as a child in 1968, when his parents took him to a Chinese restaurant in the San Fernando Valley in the Los Angeles area. He loved its faux-Polynesian decor and was fascinated by the elaborate cocktails that were served. He later explained, "It was this weird, mysterious adult thing that was a part of the whole exotic fantasy world.... drinks would come with all kinds of elaborate garnishes. It had a huge impression on me, and that became my favorite place to go."

By the 1970s the tiki craze, which had been launched by Donn Beach and Victor Bergeron in the 1930s, was fading; formerly popular with celebrities and trend-setters, tiki-themed restaurants forty years later were regarded as "tacky". As Berry explained in a 2010 interview, "the fad entered middle-age, and became something your parents did." As an adult Berry still loved the style, as did his wife Annene Kaye, a former bartender. He particularly wanted to know how to make the elaborate, exotic drinks associated with the theme. Owners and bartenders of the tiki era held their drink recipes as closely guarded secrets; Beach kept the actual recipes secret even from his bartenders, telling them to use one ounce from Bottle A and a quarter ounce from Bottle B. As a result, low-quality imitations of classic drinks like the Mai Tai and the Zombie became common. Berry and Kaye set out to rediscover or reverse-engineer the original drinks that were served at now largely defunct icons like Trader Vic's and Don the Beachcomber as well as surviving tiki palaces like Mai Kai, Tiki Ti, Tonga Room and Bali Hai. He bought out-of-print drink recipe books and collected memorabilia like placemats, menus, and coasters. He searched out old-school bartenders and persuaded them to share their secret recipes with him.

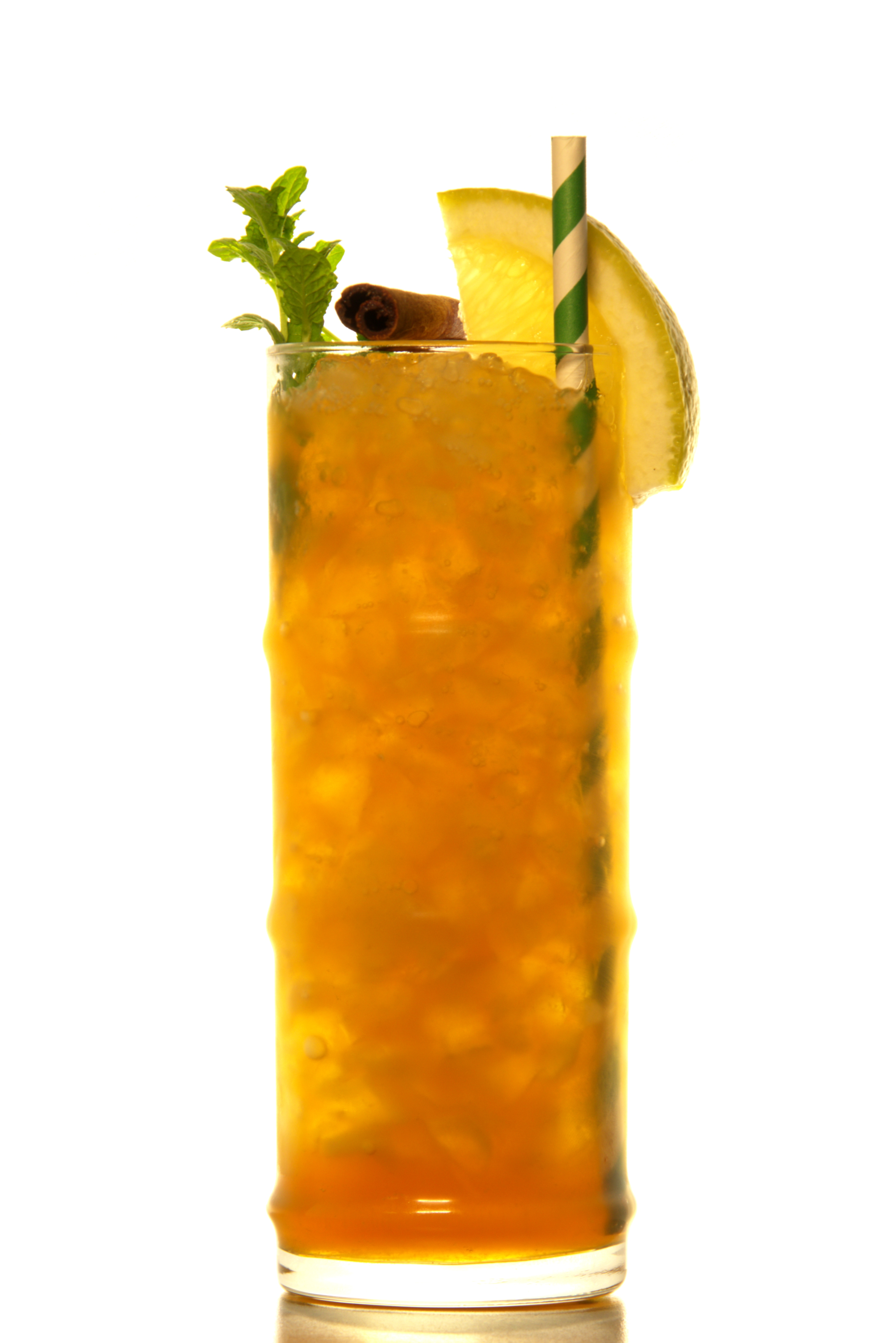
Zombie cocktail

At first Berry's research was just a hobby. He and fellow enthusiasts would gather at backyard luaus hosted by Otto Von Stroheim; the parties proved a strong influence in keeping tiki culture alive and helping to inspire the "tiki renaissance" of the early 21st century. Berry began to compile the recipes he found through his research into scrapbooks for friends. He published his first book, Beach Bum Berry's Grog Log, in 1998. The book has been called "pivotal" for popularizing the tiki theme as well as giving bartenders the recipes they needed to attract a new generation of customers. The Tonga Hut, Los Angeles's oldest tiki bar, offered customers a Grog Log Challenge: to drink, within a year, all 78 cocktails whose recipes are printed in the Grog Log.

Two years later Berry wrote the chapter on tropical drinks, called "Mixologists and Concoctions", in Sven Kirsten's influential The Book of Tiki. Tiki-themed bars and restaurants began to come back into style. Soon researching, writing, and giving talks about tropical drinks was his main activity. In 2015 he commented, "All these neo-tiki bars were opening up all over the world... and between 75 and 90 percent of their menus were all recipes I had found."

The recipes in Berry's books are mostly for classic drinks, some of which had never been published before and required years of sleuthing to discover. They also include historical information about the originators of tiki such as Beach and Bergeron, as well as important early contributors to the tiki renaissance such as Von Stroheim and Kirsten. His fourth book, Beachbum Berry's Sippin' Safari (2007), includes what he believes to be Beach's original recipe for the Zombie, which had never been written down except in code. He spent a year and a half researching how to make the perfect Daiquiri. Some of his rediscovered classic drink mixes are marketed by Trader Tiki.

In 2014, he and Kaye opened a tiki-themed restaurant and bar, Beachbum Berry’s Latitude 29, in the French Quarter of New Orleans. He said operating the restaurant is "the first time I've worked set hours since 1985."

In 2021, Jeff Berry partnered with rum importer Ed Hamilton to release "Beachbum Berry's Zombie Blend" rum.

== Impact ==
M. Carrie Allan of The Washington Post described Berry's work in researching and reconstructing lost recipes as that of a "cocktail archeologist." Wayne Curtis, historian and author of And a Bottle of Rum: A History of the New World in Ten Cocktails, dubbed him "the Indiana Jones of tiki drinks." Berry calls himself a "tropical drink evangelist." Steven Kurutz of The New York Times said, "Mr. Berry’s lasting contribution may be in salvaging tropical drinks from decades of bad bartending." The Australian Bartender noted, "It's hard to overstate this guy’s importance for tiki bars: Jeff Berry literally wrote the books on tiki."

== Publications ==
- —— (1998). Beach Bum Berry's Grog Log. SLG Publishing. ISBN 978-0-943151-20-5. OCLC 56605323.
- —— (2003). Pape, Craig (ed.). Beachbum Berry's Intoxica!. SLG Publishing. ISBN 978-0-943151-57-1. OCLC 969388279.
- —— (2005). Beach Bum Berry's Taboo Table. SLG Publishing. ISBN 978-0-943151-99-1. OCLC 665986785.
- —— (2007). Beachbum Berry's Sippin' Safari. SLG Publishing. ISBN 978-1-59362-067-7. OCLC 137313866.
- —— (2010). Beach Bum Berry Remixed. San Jose, CA: Club Tiki Press. ISBN 978-1-59362-139-1. OCLC 751428766.
- —— (2014). Beachbum Berry's Potions of the Caribbean. Cocktail Kingdom. ISBN 978-1-60311-380-9. OCLC 882113102.
- —— (2017). Beachbum Berry's Sippin' Safari (Expanded 10th Anniversary ed.). Cocktail Kingdom. ISBN 978-1-941199-16-9. OCLC 1180291246.

== Drink creations ==
Although Berry's books have primarily chronicled the sometimes "lost" recipes from historical bartenders of the past such as Beach, Bergeron, Tony Ramos, and Harry Yee, Berry has also invented and published some of his own cocktail recipes. Examples that have appeared in other bartender guides, drink apps, or tiki websites include the Ancient Mariner, Bum’s Rush, Castaway, Hai Karate, Restless Native, Sea of Cortez, Hula-Hula, and Von Tiki.

== See also ==
- List of bartenders
