= Diki-diki =

Cocktail made with calvados, Swedish Punsch and grapefruit juice

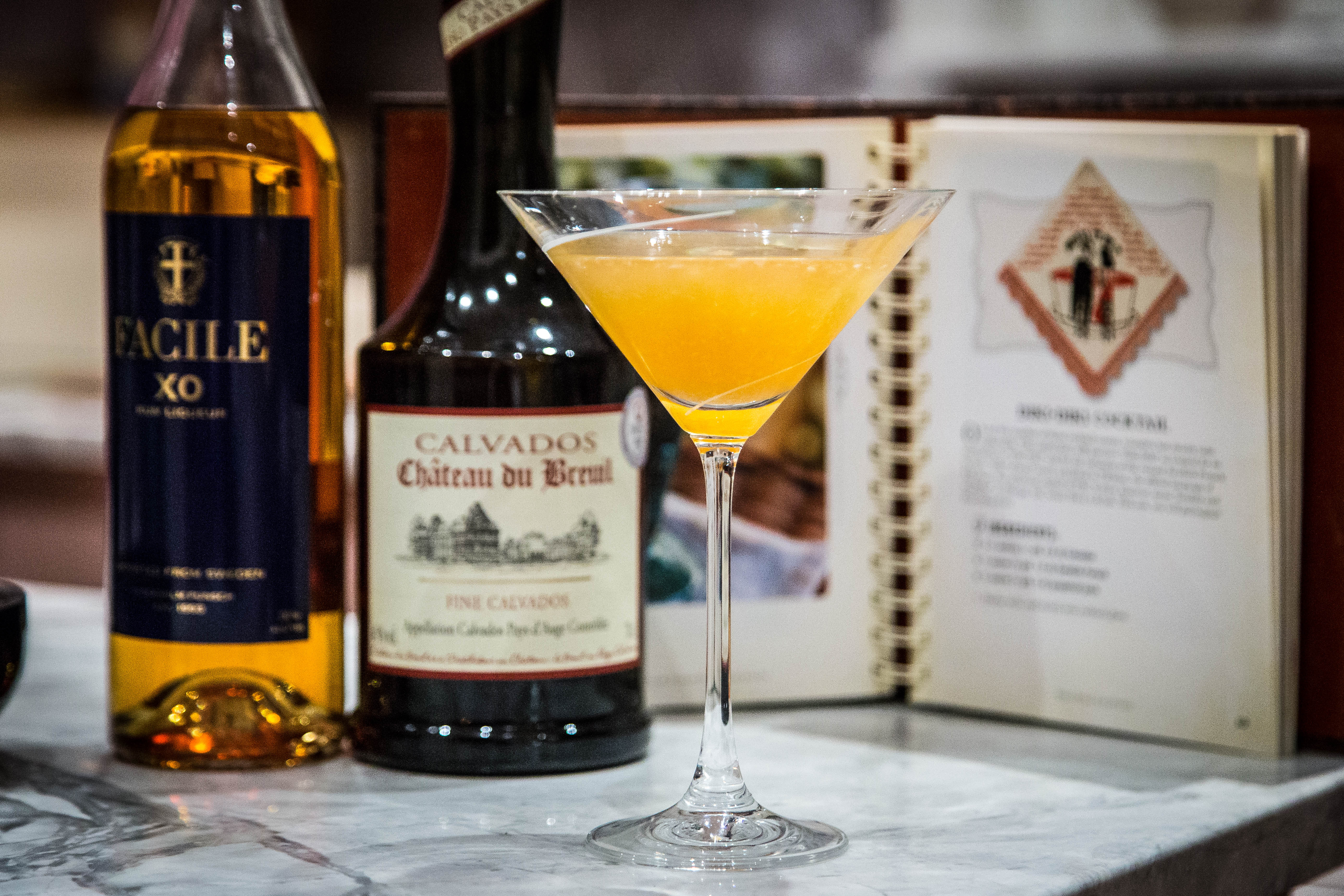
Diki-diki cocktail

The diki-diki is a cocktail made with Calvados, Swedish Punsch, and grapefruit juice, dating back to the 1920s where it was popular in London's higher-end American bar scene but is now more commonly served as a Tiki drink. The original recipe calls for shaking the ingredients with ice in 2:1:1 proportions, although many later variations have modified the ratio to greater emphasize the calvados as the base ingredient (4:1:1).

== Historical origin ==
Belgian bartender Robert Vermiere is credited with creating the diki-diki, who listed it in his book Cocktails: How to Mix Them, along with a notation that he introduced the cocktail at London's Embassy Club in February 1922. Fellow cocktail book author Harry MacElhone commented that "this is a very popular cocktail in London" in his 1923 drink manual Harry of Ciro's ABC of Mixing Cocktails. MacElhone's listing employed the more calvados-oriented version with a 4:1:1 ratio. This was also the proportion used in Trader Vic's Bartender's Guide and Harry Cradock's Savoy Cocktail Book .

== Modern-day usage ==
The diki-diki is currently served primarily in Tiki bars, and as an example has been on the drink menu at the Tiki Ti.

There is some disagreement over whether the diki-diki should be considered as a true tiki drink. Because of the era it was created in, the diki-diki could not have been considered as an express tiki drink as first envisioned because the Polynesian inspired tiki craze had not yet started. However, Vermiere did employ an interesting backstory when he created the cocktail by stating that it was named after the "chief monarch of the Island Ubian (Southern Philippines), who is now 37 years old, weighs 23 pounds, and his height is 32 inches". While likely a fictionalisation, there nevertheless was a real life Philippine leader named Lapulapu, who was responsible for the death of Ferdinand Magellan and for whom a later tiki drink was named. The Lapulapu cocktail has been served alongside the diki-diki cocktail at the Tiki Ti. The Puka-Puka cocktail, named after the Polynesian atoll "discovered" by Ferdinand Magellan in 1521 is also a tiki drink. As such one may wish to consider the shared folklore of the diki-diki cocktail as an inspiration of sorts for the names of the Lapulapu and Puka-Puka tiki cocktails.

Tiki pioneer Victor Bergeron, who named his first restaurant Hinky Dinks, included the recipe for the diki-diki cocktail in his bartender's guide.

== See also ==
- List of cocktails
