= Trader Sam's Enchanted Tiki Bar =

Themed bar at Disneyland Hotel

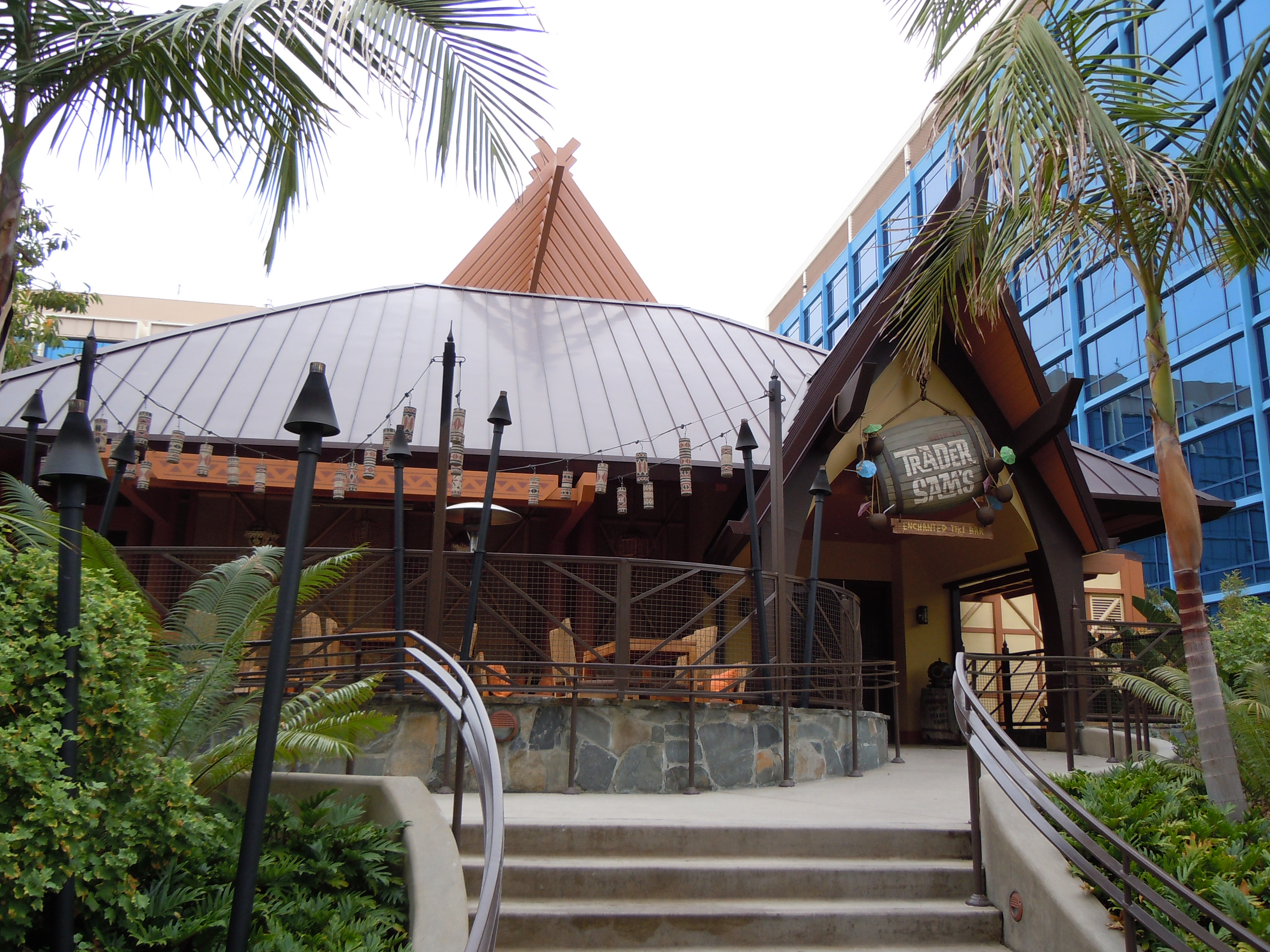
- Trader Sam's exterior
- Interactive map of Trader Sam's Enchanted Tiki Bar

Restaurant information
- Established: May 2011
- Owners: Disney Experiences, a division of The Walt Disney Company
- Location: Anaheim, Orange, California, United States
- Coordinates: 33°48′29.76″N 117°55′35.76″W

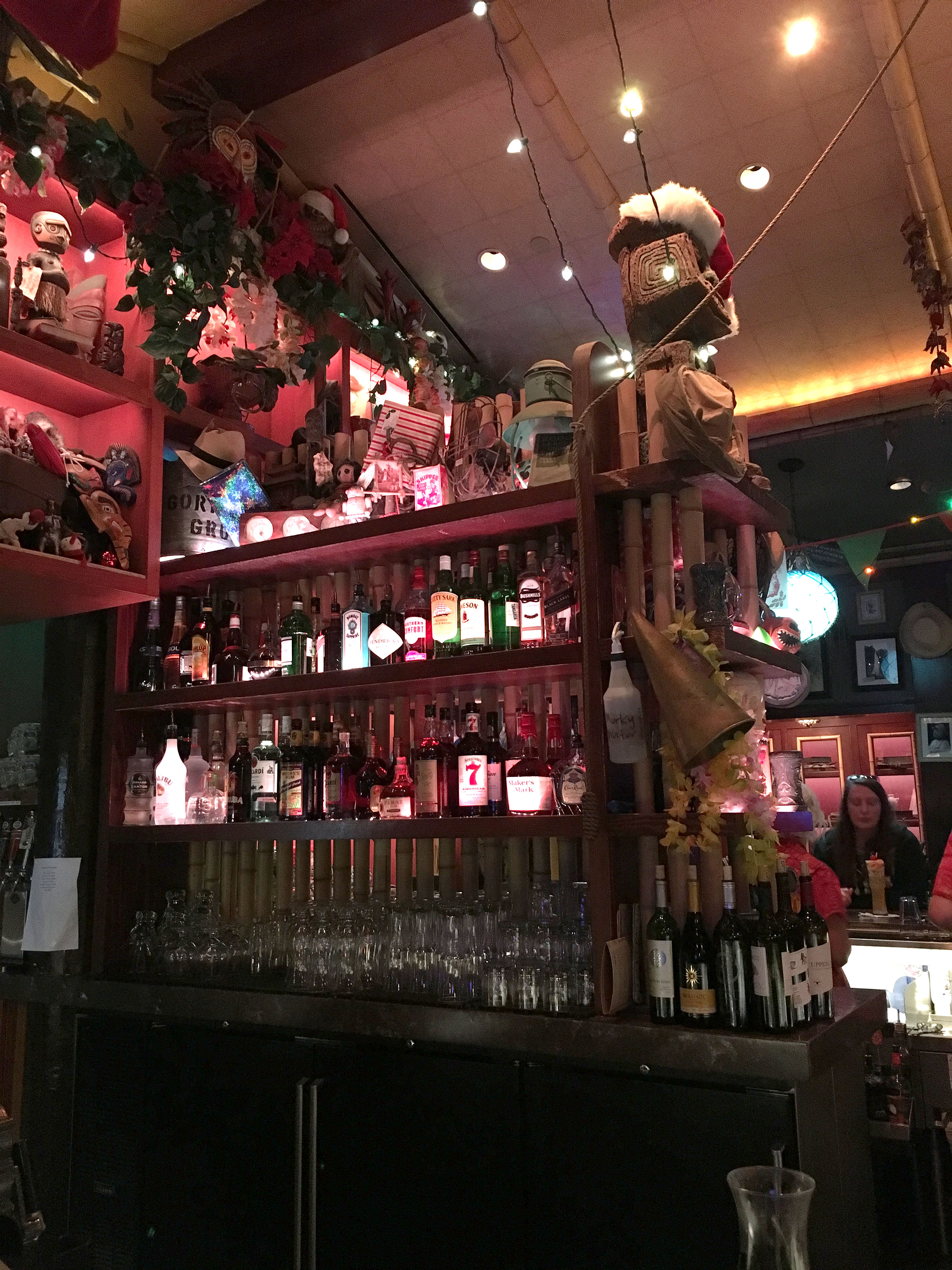
Inside of Trader Sam's Enchanted Tiki Bar

Trader Sam's Enchanted Tiki Bar is a tiki bar located at the Disneyland Hotel in the Disneyland Resort of Anaheim, California, that opened in May 2011. Named one of the top five tiki bars in Los Angeles by LA Weekly, Trader Sam's is one of many tiki bars gaining popularity throughout the world, in what some call tiki's "third wave". It is not to be confused with the San Francisco, California tiki bar Trad'r Sam, founded in 1937.

== Influences and references ==
Trader Sam's incorporates elements of traditional tiki bars (e.g. glass floats, bamboo, tiki carvings) combined with memorabilia from Disney rides and movies such as Indiana Jones and 20,000 Leagues Under the Sea. According to Brandon Kleyla, Disney Imagineer and head decorator for Trader Sam's, there are more than 1,600 items decorating the interior.

In addition to classic tiki bar details, Trader Sam's contains references to many elements of the Adventureland area of Disneyland. The Jungle Cruise ride introduces Trader Sam as the "head salesman" of the Jungle Cruise Navigational Company, which explains all the tiki memorabilia throughout the bar. Also, in keeping with the bar's Jungle Cruise theme, bartenders are all referred to as "Skippers" and one of the drinks is called "Schweitzer Falls", one of the landmarks pointed out in the Jungle Cruise ride. As a nod to the influences of Walt Disney's Enchanted Tiki Room, there is a drink called "Tiki Tiki Tiki Tiki Tiki Rum" and carved tiki figures with slowly-moving eyes on each end of the bar that are identical to the ones in the Enchanted Tiki Room attraction. The tiki drummers above the bar near the ceiling are also from the Enchanted Tiki Room.

References to various Disney franchises featured in the bar include Indiana Jones' bullwhip, a letter from Short Round (a character from the Indiana Jones movies), a map of the Temple of the Forbidden Eye from Indiana Jones Adventure, the voodoo doll from Indiana Jones and the Temple of Doom, and the harpoon from 20,000 Leagues Under the Sea. A few references to the Adventurers Club at Walt Disney World in Florida can also be found, such as a postcard from Samantha Sterling (a cabaret singer at the Adventurers Club) and a letter from Pamela Perkins (the club's president) on an Adventurers Club letterhead. Guests can also get a Kungaloosh cocktail, named after the Adventurer's Club official greeting.

== Cocktail-triggered animatronics ==
Trader Sam's uses animatronics, lighting, sound effects, and employee interaction when certain drinks are ordered. They include; tiki carvings with moving eyes that slowly move back and forth, an animated shipwreck in a bottle, erupting volcanoes, and bar stools that sink slowly into the floor. Only specific drinks trigger these responses, such as:

- Shipwreck on the Rocks → The ship in a bottle above the bar encounters stormy seas and begins to sink.
- Krakatoa Punch → The serene Polynesian scene outside the faux window shows a storm gathering as the volcano begins to erupt.
- Shrunken Zombie Head → Certain bar stools will begin lowering toward the floor (Bartenders can also do this independently of drink orders to have fun with customers).
- Uh Oa! → The bartender rings a bell, people begin chanting "Uh OA! Uh OA! Uh OA OA OA!" and cast members spray water into the air so that it feels like it's beginning to rain.
- Draft Beer → Beer draft handles are carved tiki heads with lighted eyes. When a bartender pulls a draft, tiki drums and chants begin to play. The more drafts that are pulled in succession, the faster the drums and chanting go.

== Spin-offs ==
A second Disney Tiki Bar, called Trader Sam's Grog Grotto, opened in 2015 at Disney's Polynesian Resort in Walt Disney World. During a Halloween event at the Disneyland Trader Sam's, more details were shared about the new location in Florida. While the Anaheim location draws its inspiration from the Enchanted Tiki Room and Jungle Cruise attractions at Disneyland, the Grog Grotto incorporates themes from the classic film 20,000 Leagues Under the Sea in addition to the aforementioned attractions.

== Tiki mugs ==
The following souvenir tiki mugs are available with certain drinks:

- Krakatoa (fogcutter shape)
- Uh-Oa bowl
- Shrunken zombie head
- Shipwreck rum barrel
- Opened mouth piranha

== See also ==
- Don the Beachcomber
- Trader Vic's
- Tiki Ti
