= Pago Pago Lounge =

- Pago Pago
- U.S. Historic district – Contributing property
- Arizona Register of Historic Places
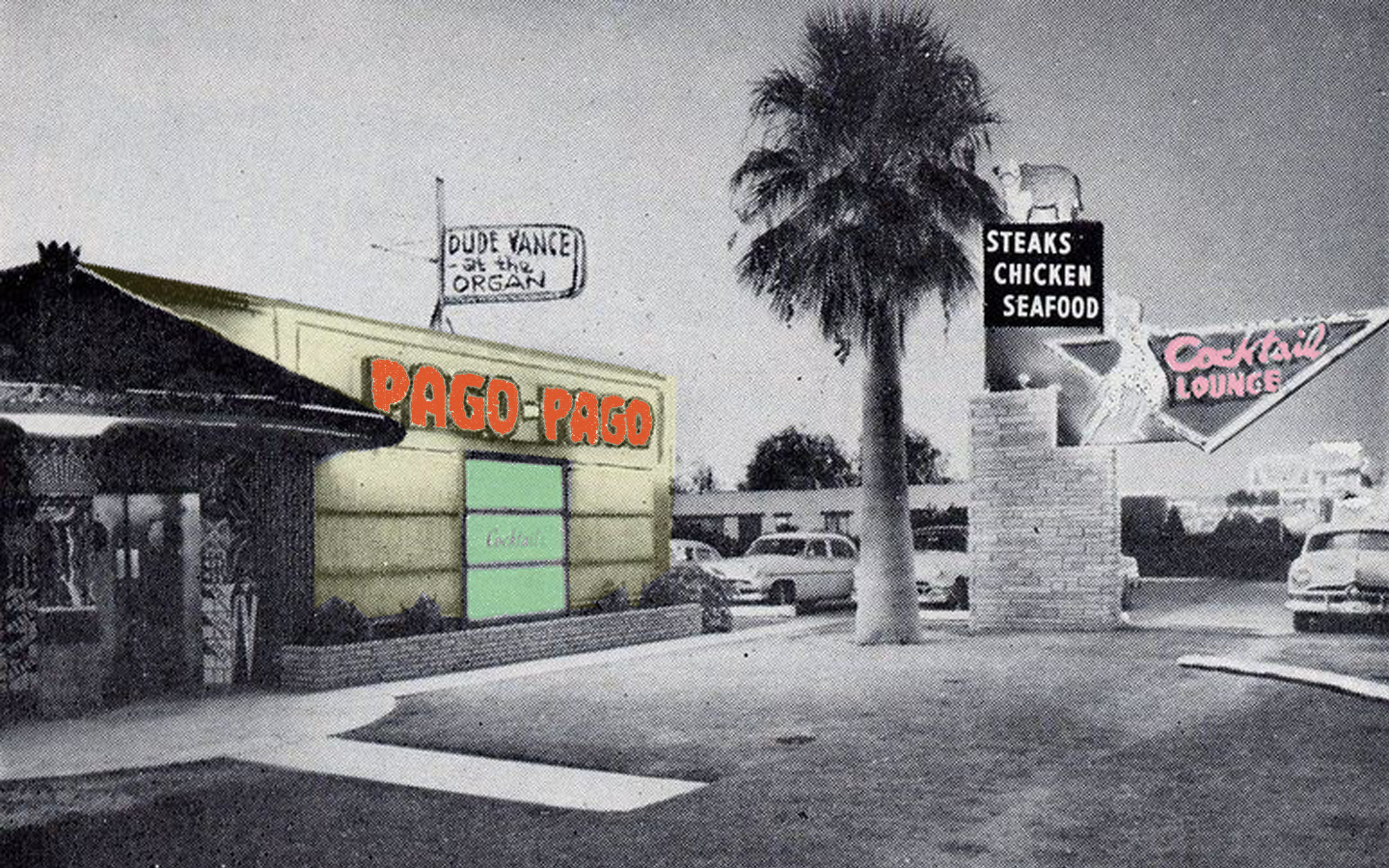
- Location: 2201 N. Oracle Road, Tucson, Arizona
- Area: 1.19 acres (0.48 ha)
- Built: 1947
- Architect: Blanton & Cole
- Architectural style: Tiki, Modernism, Exoticism
- Part of: Miracle Mile Historic District (ID100001208)
- MPS: Miracle Mile Historic District
- Designated CP: December 11, 2017

Pago Pago Lounge was a mid-twentieth century Tiki Bar named for and inspired by the capital city of Pago Pago on the South Pacific Ocean island of American Samoa. Opened in 1947, it was the first Tiki themed restaurant and bar in Tucson, Arizona located in the Miracle Mile Historic District.

== History ==
In 1947 the architectural firm of Blanton and Cole was commissioned to design the exotic Pago-Pago Restaurant and Cocktail Lounge, a nightclub at 2201 N. Oracle Road (along the Miracle Mile Strip) for business partners Bob McAffee and Homer Moore. The project included design consultation from restaurant designers Clif and Lou Sawyer (who were involved in numerous other tiki-themed bars including Link Paola's Outrigger in Honolulu, Trade Winds in Wagon Wheel Junction - Oxnard, California, Moongate in Los Angeles, the South Seas in Anchorage Alaska, and the Bikini in Phoenix, and The Lanai in San Mateo, California) and was built by general contractor F.B. Pacheco.

The Pago Pago was a one-story boxy, rectangular building that featured an entrance porch designed to evoke a Polynesian palapa. The circular entrance walls were adorned with faux Polynesian deco murals. Signs made of large individual letters outlined in neon spelled out “Pago Pago”; on both the east and north walls. The lounge featured a long, curving bar with a painted night sky and irregularly arranged booths. The building was a featured location in the 1956 MGM movie A Kiss Before Dying.

The restaurant tagline was "It's Topical! It's Tropical, It's the Pago Pago.""

In the late 20th century, the building was heavily modified but the original palm trees and building form survived. The building awaits restoration.

== Pago Pago cocktail ==
It is unknown if the Pago Pago created a drink named after itself when it first opened. One recipe from circa 1963 for the Lounge's eponymous tiki drink calls for:

- 1 oz dark Jamaican rum
- 1 oz orange juice
- 3/4 oz white grapefruit juice
- 3/4 oz lime juice
- 3/4 oz honey
- 1 dash Angostura bitters

Blended without ice, poured into pilsner glass filled with crushed ice.

== Other themed cocktails ==
In addition to the Pago Pago cocktail, the lounge developed a series of exotic tiki drinks which included:

- Deep Purple
- Dragonet
- La Rhumba
- Lupa-Lupa
- Red Opu
- Samoa of Samoa
- Sarong
