= Chin Tiki =

Former nightclub in Detroit

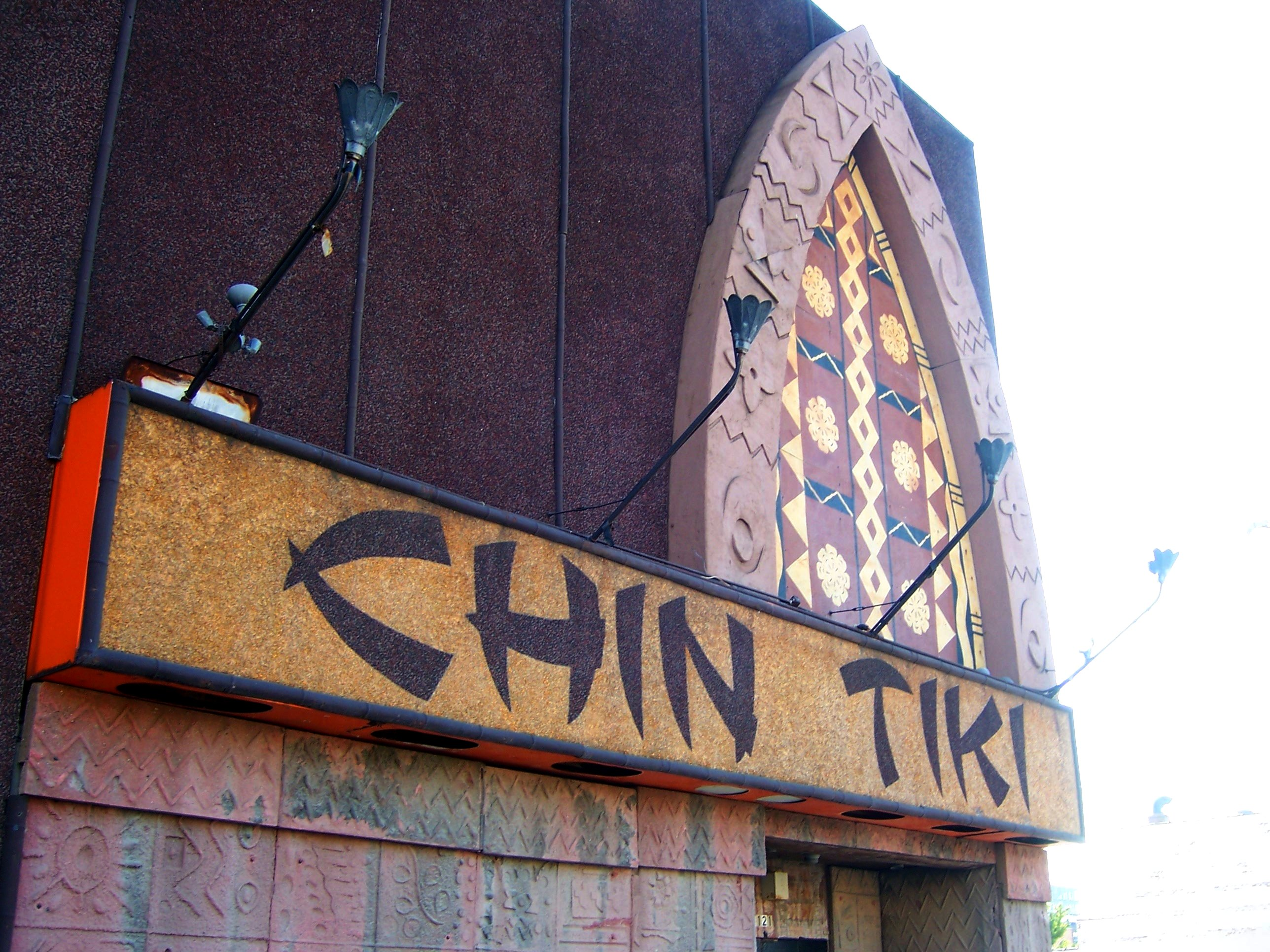
- Chin Tiki, circa 2007
- Interactive map of Chin Tiki

Restaurant information
- Established: July 1966
- Closed: 1980
- Food type: Polynesian
- Location: 2121 Cass Ave, Detroit, Michigan, Michigan, United States
- Coordinates: 42°20′10″N 83°3′21″W

Chin Tiki was a tiki-themed supper club, nightclub and banquet hall in Detroit, Michigan owned by Marvin Chin. It closed in 1980 and was demolished in 2009.

== History ==
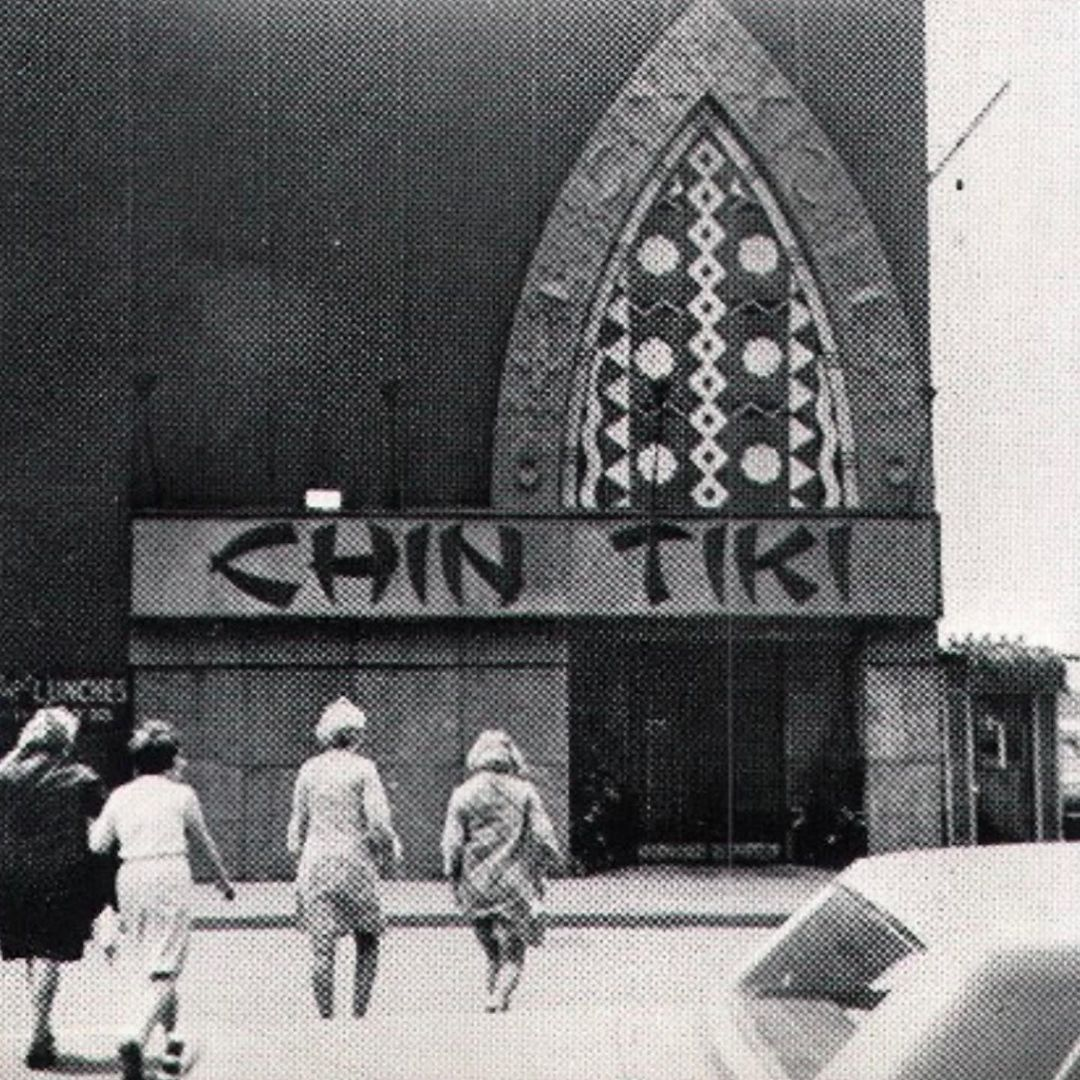
Frankenmuth High School students seen going to dinner at the Chin Tiki restaurant in 1967. The school yearbook said Chin Tiki was "famous for its Polynesian atmosphere and cuisine."

The Chin Tiki saw construction begin in 1965 and opened in July 1966. A former engineer for Ford, Chin designed the restaurant himself, and had a hand in most of the construction. Inspired by the burgeoning Tiki culture fad of the 1950s and 1960s, the first floor restaurant was ornately decorated "with towering tiki statues, waterfalls and a bamboo bridge." It also featured a large black light aquarium mural. The drink menu included well known tiki drinks such as the Sharks Tooth, Head Hunter, and Fog Cutter, as well as the Chin Tiki Punch and the Chin Tiki Special, which was a communal drink meant for sharing, served in a large clam shell with long straws, and described as "a fusing of fine rums, brandy, liqueurs and fresh fruit juices crowned with a gardenia".

Chuck Thurston of the Detroit Free Press described what it was like to visit the Chin Tiki in August 1966:

In order to get into Chin Tiki at 2121 Cass you have to reach into an idol's eye, a rather unnerving experience, but once inside, Detroit’s new Polynesian restaurant is softly-lit, cool and decorated to make one hear the distant boom of surf on the outer reef of the atoll. It is wise to consult one of the bare-foot waitresses extensively about the menu. But you can’t go wrong with Kau Kau (pronounced Koah Koah), which is a collection of things done with fish, pork, chicken and lobster. The Chin Tiki specializes in drinks formulated with exotic and obscure juices but you can get an excellent Martini of you are properly polite.

The second floor housed a spacious nightclub with an even larger waterfall, imitation rock walls and a rattan covered stage. The Chin Tiki hosted live music and an authentic Polynesian floor show with Hawaiian dancers and fire-breathers. The restaurant was said to be frequented by such celebrities as Muhammad Ali, Barbra Streisand and Joe DiMaggio.

One of Chin's early competitors was the other large Detroit area Tiki restaurant named the Mauna Loa, but it was short lived.

Following Detroit's economic downturn, Chin shuttered Chin Tiki in 1980, where it remained untouched for two decades and was deemed "a Tiki tomb, a time capsule," by local tiki enthusiasts. However, after Chin died in 2006 his family quickly sold the building to Olympia Development LLC, owned by Detroit mogul Mike Ilitch and family. The building was torn down in 2009.

== Other Chin restaurants ==
In addition to the Chin Tiki, Marvin Chin owned the Port O' Three Tiki restaurant in nearby Bloomfield Hills, MI. Its menu and signage used many of the same graphics as the Chin Tiki and used the same cocktail menu. The name came from his "three types of food" concept for the restaurant which he advertised for on his matchbooks: "Marvin Chin proudly presents a new concept in dining. A unique combination of sea food, Polynesian, and Japanese cuisine under one roof....", but the restaurant stayed in business for only a short period of time.

He also owned Chin's Chop Suey, (1953–2025) a small Cantonese restaurant in Livonia, MI that was decorated with some of the Chin Tiki's former statues. After Chin's death, the restaurant was managed by his son Marlin Chin, and his grandson Steven Lim. The restaurant closed in 2025.

== In popular culture ==
The Chin Tiki was later famous for being a film location for the movie 8 Mile. The unique look of the building had gotten the attention of production designer Phil Messina, who had Universal Studios contact Chin to contract the use of his facility for the filming. The renewed interest had fueled speculation for a short period of time that the restaurant would reopen.

== Gallery ==
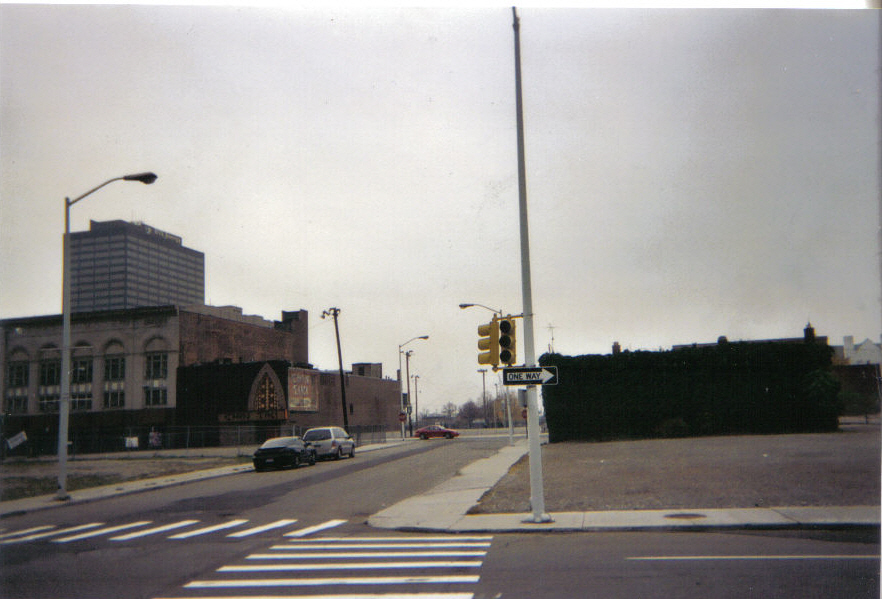

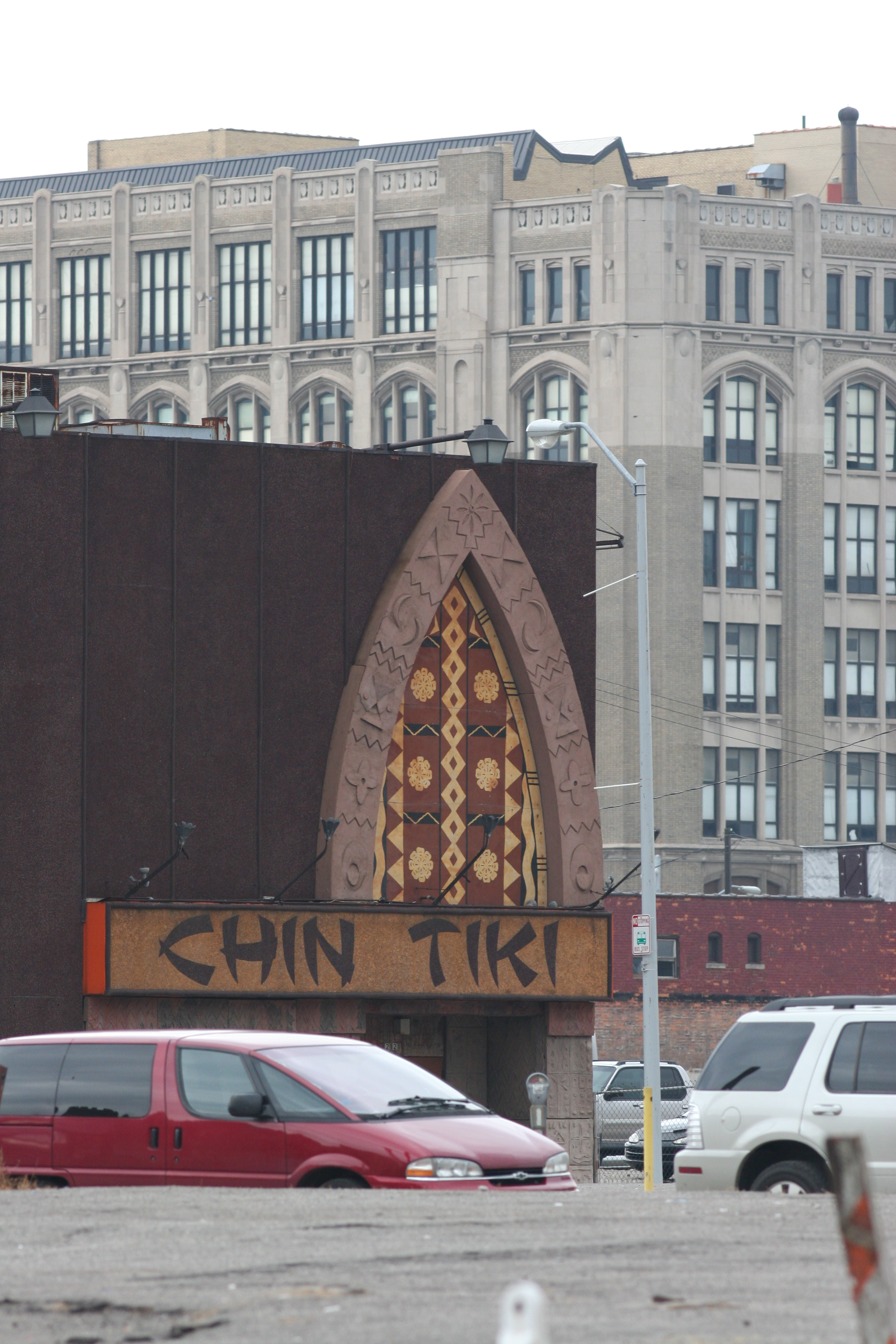

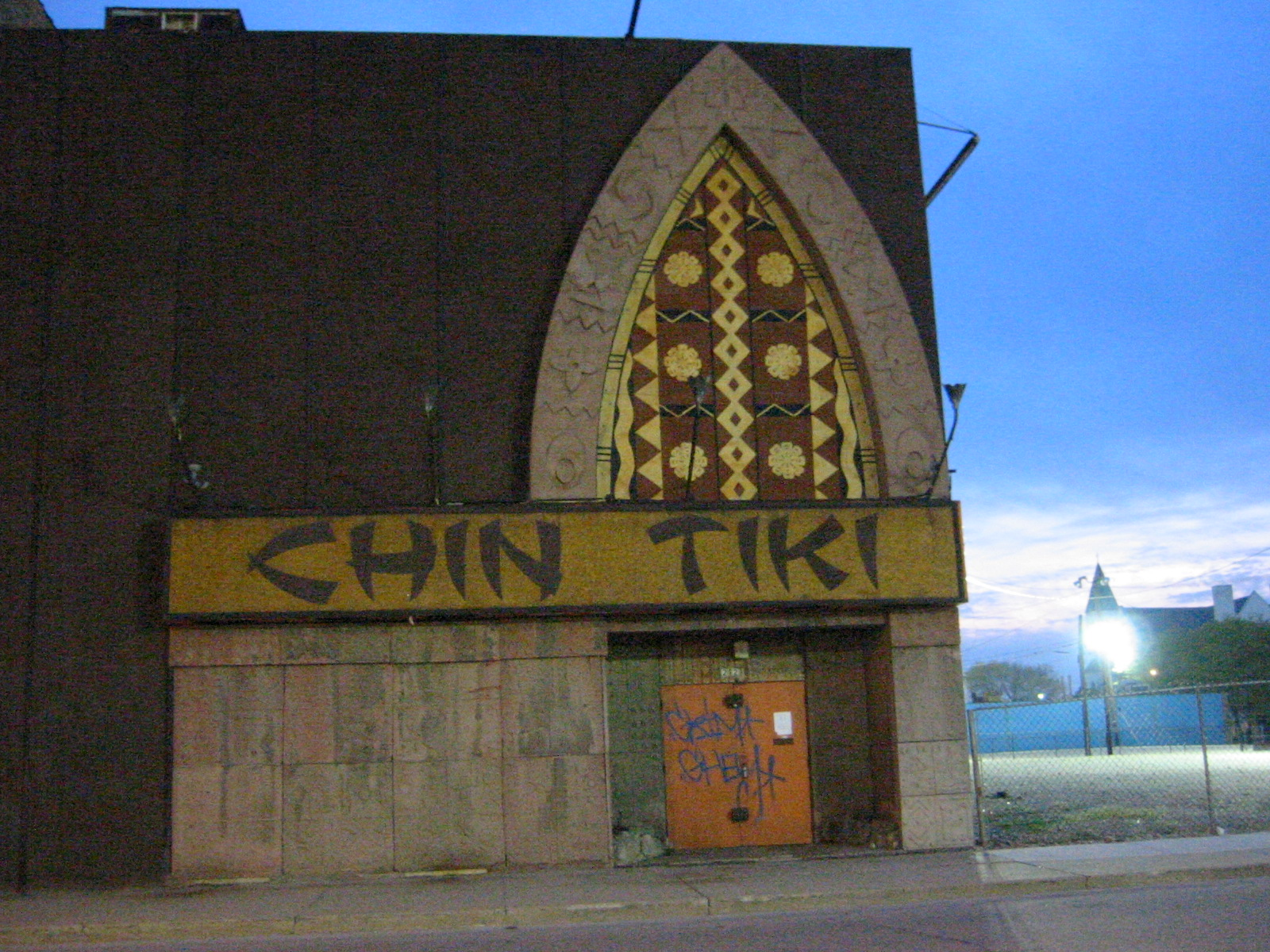

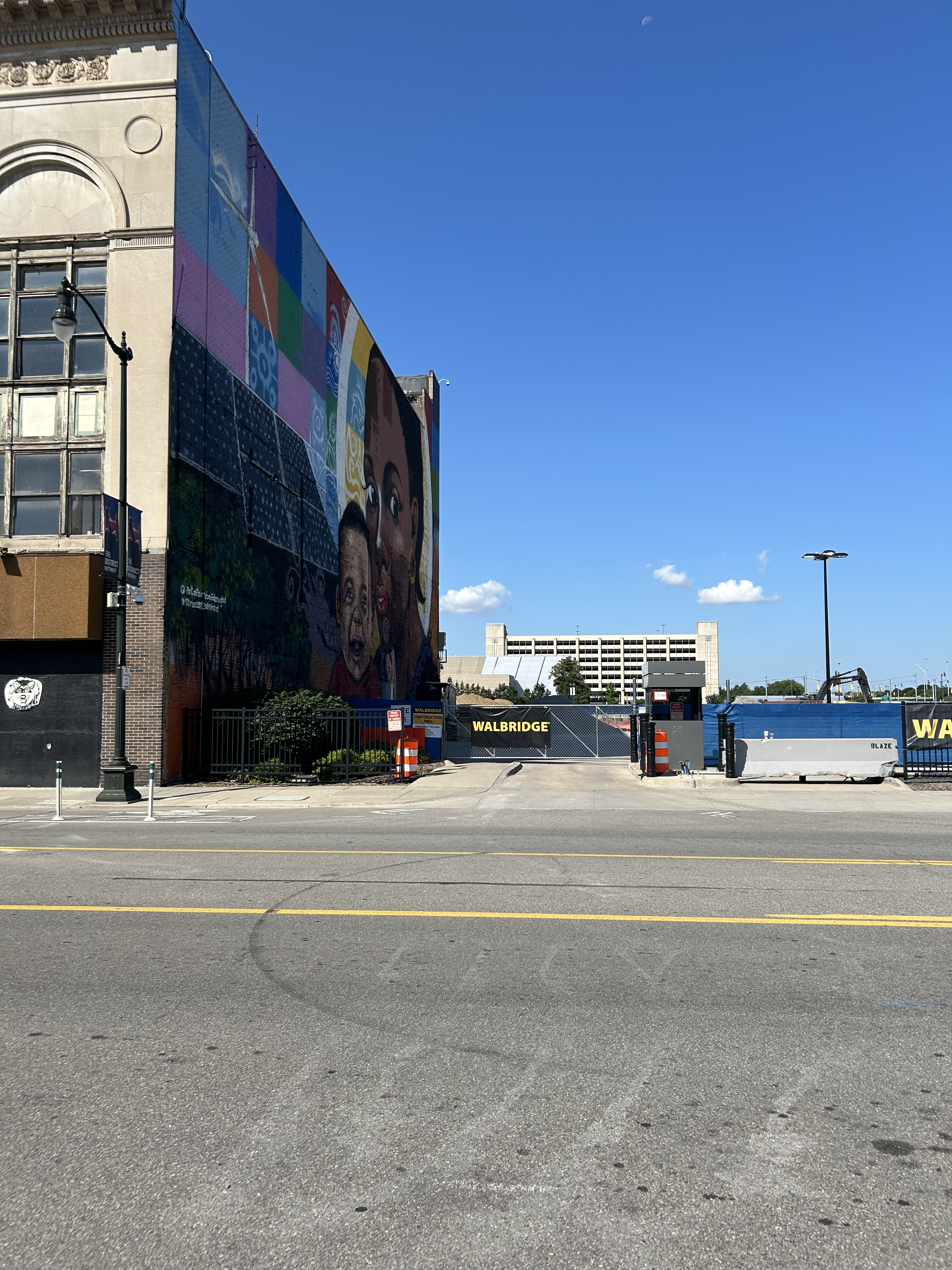

== See also ==
- History of the Chinese Americans in Metro Detroit
