= Fog Cutter =

Tiki cocktail

- Ingredients: 2 US fl oz (60 ml) Light rum; 1 US fl oz (30 ml) Brandy; 1/2 US fl oz (15 ml) Gin; 1/2 US fl oz (15 ml) Cream sherry (float); 2 US fl oz (60 ml) Lemon juice; 1 US fl oz (30 ml) Orange Juice; 1/2 US fl oz (15 ml) Orgeat syrup
- Standard drinkware: Special: Fog Cutter mug
- Served: shake everything but sherry with ice, pour, add fresh ice and sherry

The Fog Cutter is a vintage tiki cocktail frequently attributed to being invented by Victor Bergeron that calls for a mixture of several liquors (rum, brandy, gin), the juice of lemon and oranges, orgeat syrup, and cream sherry. It is high in alcoholic content and has been called the "Long Island Iced Tea of exotic drinks." It has historically been served in special Fog Cutter ceramic mugs.

Such is the case with many tiki drinks; there are also claims that the cocktail was invented at a different restaurant, including Edna Fogcutter's and Don Beach's.

== History ==
Jeffy Berry calls the Fog Cutter Trader Vic's second most historically popular cocktail, unusual for a tiki drink because of the cream sherry that is floated on top. The recipe for the drink is the same in both Bergeron's original 1947 Bartender's Guide and his revised version from 1972. The revised version carries a quote describing the cocktail: "Fog Cutter, hell. After two of these, you won't even see the stuff".

The recipe also has a mark next to it, indicating that he claimed to have invented the drink. Despite this, there is no broad agreement as to who invented the cocktail, but similar to the Mai Tai he is the person most associated with it and receives credit for the Fog Cutter's broad popularization. An official Trader Vic's drink menu postcard from the 1940s lists a Fog Cutter and reads "What a sneaker - positively only two to a person; really, I don't see why people buy them."

== Variations ==
Bergeron revised the drink in the 1950s to make it less potent, calling it the Samoan Fog Cutter. It is essentially the same recipe but has 1 US fl oz (30 ml) less liquor, cutting back on the amount of rum and brandy while still retaining its character as a predominantly rum-based drink. It was also blended instead of shaken.

A Viking Fog Cutter from a Nordic restaurant floated aquavit instead of the cream sherry. A still different version from the Bali Hai at The Beach in New Orleans spelled their Fogg Cutter with an extra "g". It was a similar drink to Vic's original but added dark Jamaican rum and swapped lemon for the lime juice; most importantly, it dropped the use of the sherry float.

Some modern day Tiki drink experts don't care for Vic's original version, calling it only "just fine" or saying that later versions were "much improved". Others believe Vic's represents the best version.

== Eponymous mug ==
The Fog Cutter is the only drink in Trader Vic's 1947 Bartender's Guide that carried an illustration for a ceramic mug with a Polynesian motif, making it one of the first ceramic tiki mugs (as the term is used generically; the book also carried an illustration for a ceramic mug in the shape of a skull and large ceramic drinking bowls). As drawn in his Bartender's Guide, the mug is shown as a depiction of a Hula girl. Actual versions appeared slightly different but with the same subject matter.

A later version of the mug, often attributed to Vic's Samoan Fog Cutter version, depicts a relaxing man being serenaded by a wahine with a ukulele under a bright sun.

A common drink on the menu of most tiki bars, over 50 variations of a mug meant to hold a Fog Cutter cocktail specifically are known to exist, many in radically different designs than the one used by Trader Vic's.
