= Sumatra Kula =

Type of cocktail

The Sumatra Kula (also known as Sumatra cooler) is a vintage tiki cocktail invented by Donn Beach that calls for light rum, equal parts orange, lime and white grapefruit juices, and is sweetened with a diluted honey mix.

== History ==
The Sumatra Kula cocktail was created by Donn Beach, also known as "the beachcomber" because of his Don the Beachcomber chain of restaurants, and may have been one of his very first drinks, allegedly gaining notoriety after he served it to a reporter from the New York Tribune. A book co-authored by his ex-wife Phoebe Beach claims it was his very first original mixed drink and sold for 25 cents. The drink as appearing on a later cocktail menu from his Hollywood location depicts it as being served in a tall curved glass accompanied by a leafy garnish and selling for 85 cents. The drink was not typically ordered at other types of bars but began gaining attention again during the 21st century resurgence in tiki culture.

Named in part in reference to Sumatra, some also believe that the word "kula" may be a separate and generic reference to the "Kula exchange", which is a reciprocal exchanging of social gifts. Beach traveled on the cheap through places where Kula was practiced such as Papua New Guinea, making the claim both plausible and speculative. In addition to being an explorer of the south pacific, Beach also traveled heavily both as a rum-runner and when he served overseas in France and Italy during World War II.

The cocktail is also sometimes mistakenly referred to as a Sumatra cooler, either an intentional play on words or a misunderstanding between similarly sounding "kula" and "cooler" drinks on Beach's menus (such as the Q.B. Cooler). Regardless, the Sumatra Kula would not be a typical "cooler" drink, as it does not contain any form of sparkling water or other carbonated beverage.

== Variations ==
Like many tiki drinks, multiple variations existed as popular cocktails whose ingredients were not known were "estimated" and given the same name at competing bars. At the Alila Bar in Bali tangerine juice and triple-sec was added. The Tiki Ti adds fassionola, a passion fruit syrup sometimes credited to Beach.
