= Tiki bar =

Bar with a "Tiki" or Polynesian theme

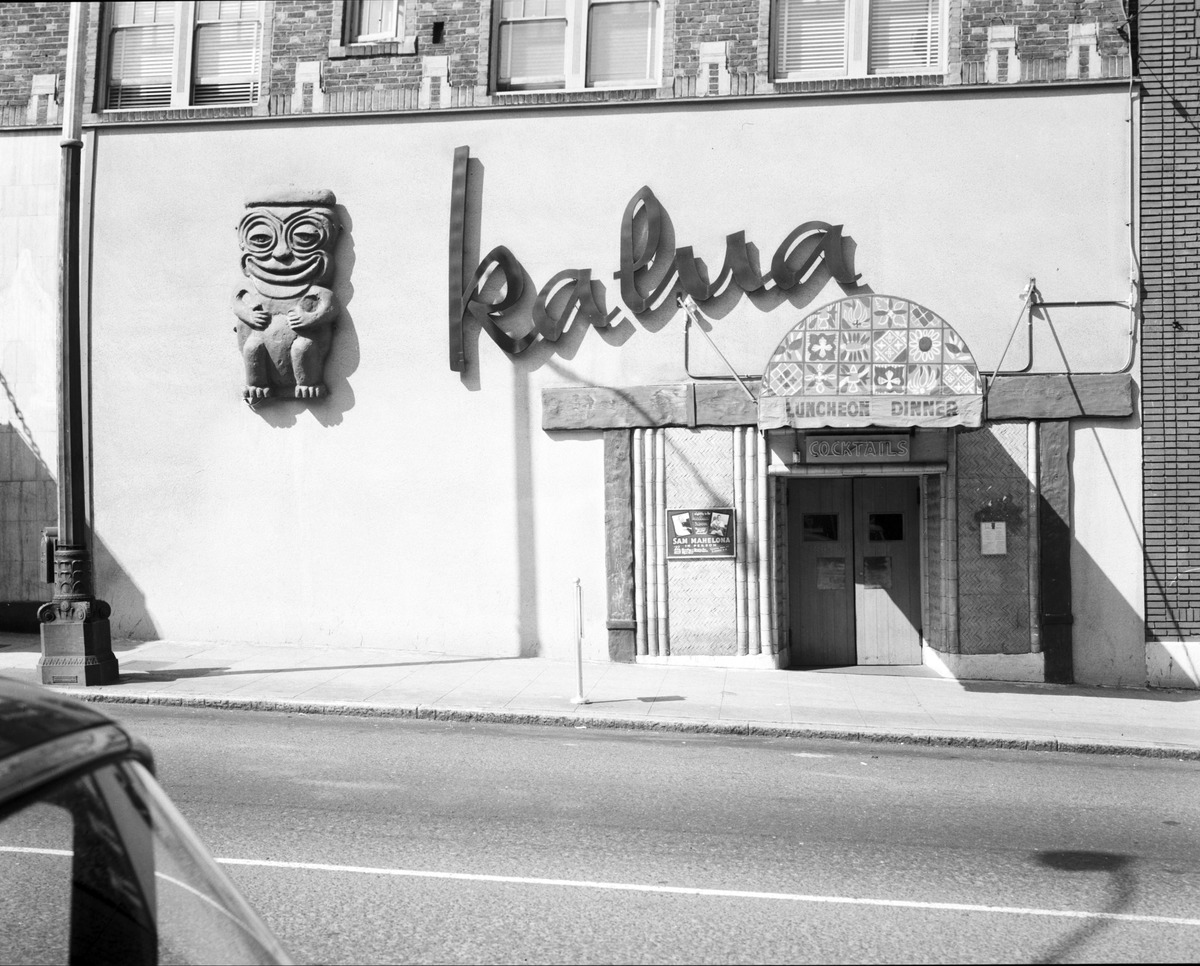
Kalua Restaurant (Seattle, 1953)

A tiki bar is a themed drinking establishment that serves elaborate cocktails, especially rum-based mixed drinks such as the Mai Tai and Zombie cocktails. Tiki bars are aesthetically defined by their tiki culture décor which is based upon a romanticized conception of tropical cultures, most commonly Polynesian. Some bars also incorporate general nautical themes or retro elements from the early atomic age.

Many early tiki bars were attached to hotels or were the bar sections for large Asian restaurants. While some are freestanding, cocktail-only affairs, many still serve food; and some hotel-related tiki establishments are still in existence. Large tiki bars may also incorporate a stage for live entertainment. Musicians such as Alfred Apaka and Don Ho played a historically important role in their popularity, and the bars also booked acts such as exotica-style bands and Polynesian dance floor shows.

== History ==
=== Don the Beachcomber ===
One of the earliest and perhaps the first known tiki bar was named "Don the Beachcomber," established in the Hollywood area of Los Angeles, California in 1933 by Ernest Gantt (who later legally changed his name to "Donn Beach"). The bar served a wide variety of exotic rum drinks (including the Sumatra Kula and Zombie cocktail), and later Cantonese food. It displayed many artifacts that he had collected on earlier trips through the tropics. When Beach was sent to World War II, Don the Beachcomber flourished under his ex-wife's management (Sunny Sund), expanding into a chain of 16 restaurants. Ultimately there were at least 25 restaurants in the chain.

When Gantt returned from the War, he moved to Hawaii and opened Waikiki Beach, one of two archetypal tiki bars. The bar was designed to evoke the South Pacific, with palm trees, tiki masks on the walls, a garden hose that showered a gentle rain on the roof and a myna bird that was trained to shout "Give me a beer, stupid!" The bar was located on the beach, lit by tiki torches outside which enhanced its ambiance. A Don the Beachcomber was located at Waikiki's International Market Place.

=== Trader Vic's ===
The other archetypical bar is Trader Vic's, the first of which was created by Victor Bergeron in Oakland, California, in 1936. The quintessential tiki cocktail, the Mai Tai, was concocted at the original Trader Vic's in 1944. He began opening franchises outside of California, beginning with The Outrigger in Seattle, Washington in 1949.

In 1957, lacking the capital to expand, Bergeron partnered with Conrad Hilton and licensed the Trader Vic's brand to Hilton Hotels for $2,000,000, for use in Hiltons across the US and worldwide. Hilton retained Bergeron to oversee the decoration, staffing and operation of the restaurants for an annual salary of $65,000. Hilton soon estimated the popular Trader Vic's establishments were earning his hotel chain $5 million a year. As the chain expanded, Bergeron also marketed tiki mugs, cocktail mixes, and other products for mass retail sale.

Members of the Bergeron family still have a hand in the operations of at least one branch. The original restaurant in Oakland, California, no longer exists but there is still a Trader Vic's a few miles away in nearby Emeryville. Roughly 20 locations are operating throughout the world and bearing the iconic name.

=== Other historical establishments ===
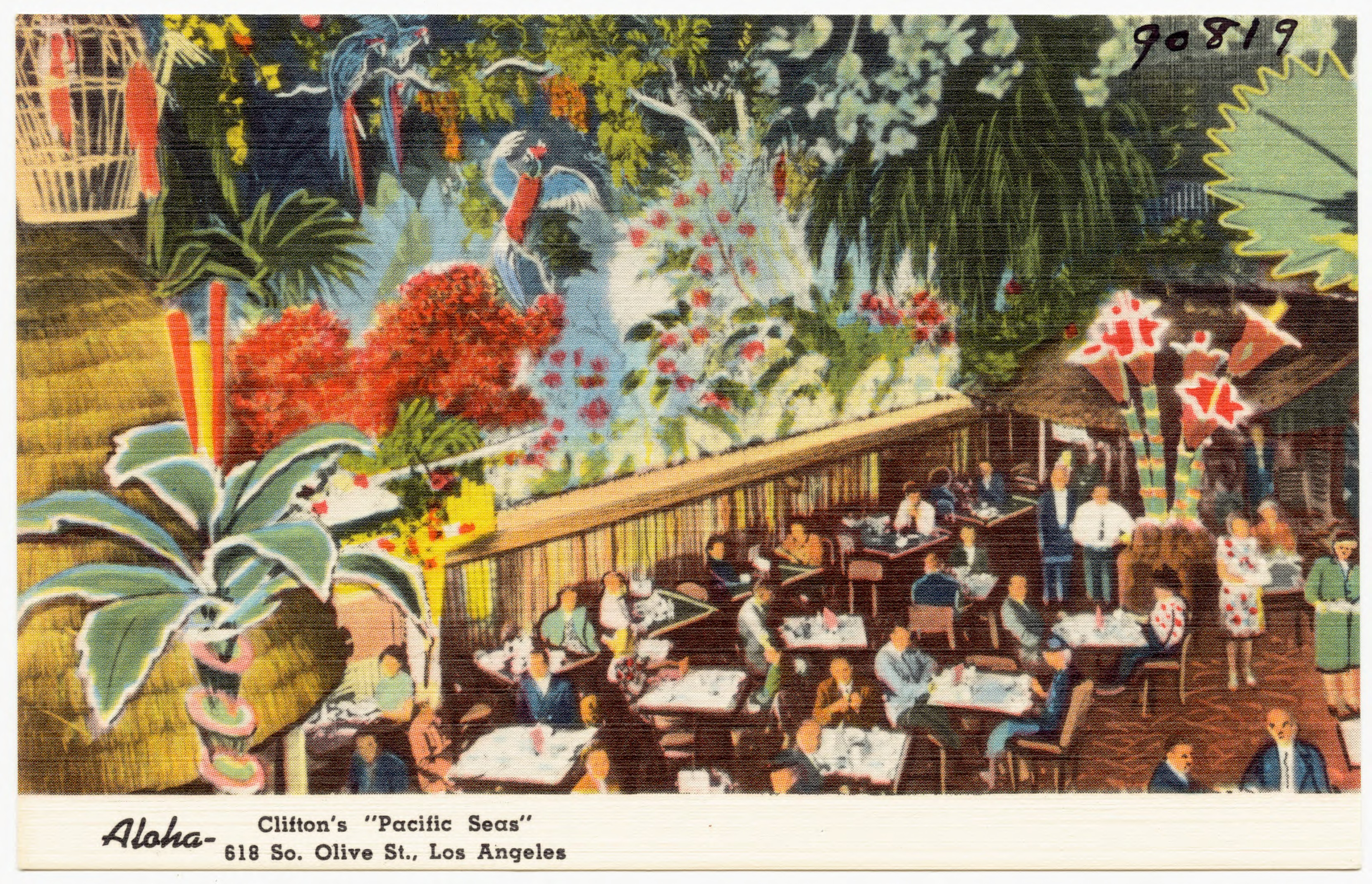
Clifton's Pacific Seas postcard

Prior to Donn Beach opening his first tiki bar, during the 1930s South Pacific-influenced dreams of escapism had started to become more prevalent in American music and popular culture. The "kitschy" Clifton's Cafeteria opened in 1931 with some elements that today could be viewed as part of "tiki-like" thematics (indoor gardens with exotic travel themes), labeled by Tiki historian Sven Kirsten as pre-tiki and part of the "birth of Polynesian pop". In 1939 Clifton's Pacific Seas was remodeled to a full-blown exotic setting and decorated with 12 waterfalls, volcanic rock, and tropical foliage. The original restaurant was demolished, but a much smaller version in the form of a side-room bar named the Pacific Seas resides at another Clifton's location.

The Tonga Room of the Fairmont Hotel in San Francisco is an iconic tiki bar operating since 1945, still retaining its Polynesian flair after having undergone a number of facelifts over the years. At one time the Sheraton Hotel, Hilton Hotel, and Marriott Hotel chains all had several tiki bars incorporated into their establishments.

From California, tiki spread north, and The Alibi Tiki Lounge is a currently operating tiki bar established in Portland, Oregon from 1947. The Kalua Room opened as part of the Windsor Hotel in Seattle in 1953 and was one of the first to put a tiki-like image next to their restaurant's name. The oldest operating tiki bar in Hawaii is the La Mariana Sailing Club Tiki Bar and Restaurant, established in 1957. The Hawaiian Village Hotel was the home to legendary tiki bartender Harry Yee.

California's Tiki Ti is another historically important tiki establishment still in operation, as is Florida's Mai Kai, which is a focal spot for a large annual hukilau tiki gathering. Shelter Island, San Diego had at one time a heavily concentrated area of tiki bars, the best known being the still operating Bali Hai.

In 1962, the now famous Kon Tiki Bar opened in Tucson, Arizona. Also in 1962, the Sip 'n Dip Lounge opened in Great Falls, Montana, bringing a tiki theme to the cold northern state and featuring a swimming pool where swimmers could be observed underwater from a window in the bar, a concept inspired by a similar design at the Playboy Club in Chicago.

The Kahiki Supper Club was a very large tiki restaurant and bar in Columbus, Ohio (since demolished). The Pago Pago Lounge was in Tucson, and the Chin Tiki and Mauna Loa were in Detroit (both closed). The Zombie Hut closed in 1990. Stephen Crane's The Luau restaurant is also gone but was considered historically important in the tiki craze's early days, as were Trader Vic's and Don the Beachcomber.

Eli Hedley (1903–1981), a sculptor and beachcomber, had "Island Trade Store", a Polynesian-themed tiki bar, in Midway City, California, "Tiki's Tropical Traders", a retail venue in Disneyland, where Steve Martin worked, and also worked with Donn Beach. (Note: Attributed to multiple sources:)

=== Decline and revival ===
The original tiki bars flourished for about 30 years, and then fell out of vogue. In the 1990s, the tiki culture was revived by a new generation of fans and new tiki bars were founded worldwide that often looked to Trader Vic's and Don the Beachcomber for inspiration. In that decade, the Sip 'n Dip Lounge, which had survived with its tiki theme intact, added the feature of having women dressed as mermaids swimming in their pool within view of the bar's patrons. The live mermaid incorporation and the overall retro tiki ambience led GQ Magazine to rate the lounge as one of the top 10 bars in the world for 2003. By the mid-2010s, both traditional tiki cocktails and new cocktails with tiki characteristics were being served in bars associated with the craft cocktail movement.

Michael Warren of The Dispatch associates the tiki revival in the 2010s and 2020s with bars such as San Francisco's Smuggler's Cove and Brooklyn's Sunken Harbor Club.

== Design and aesthetics ==
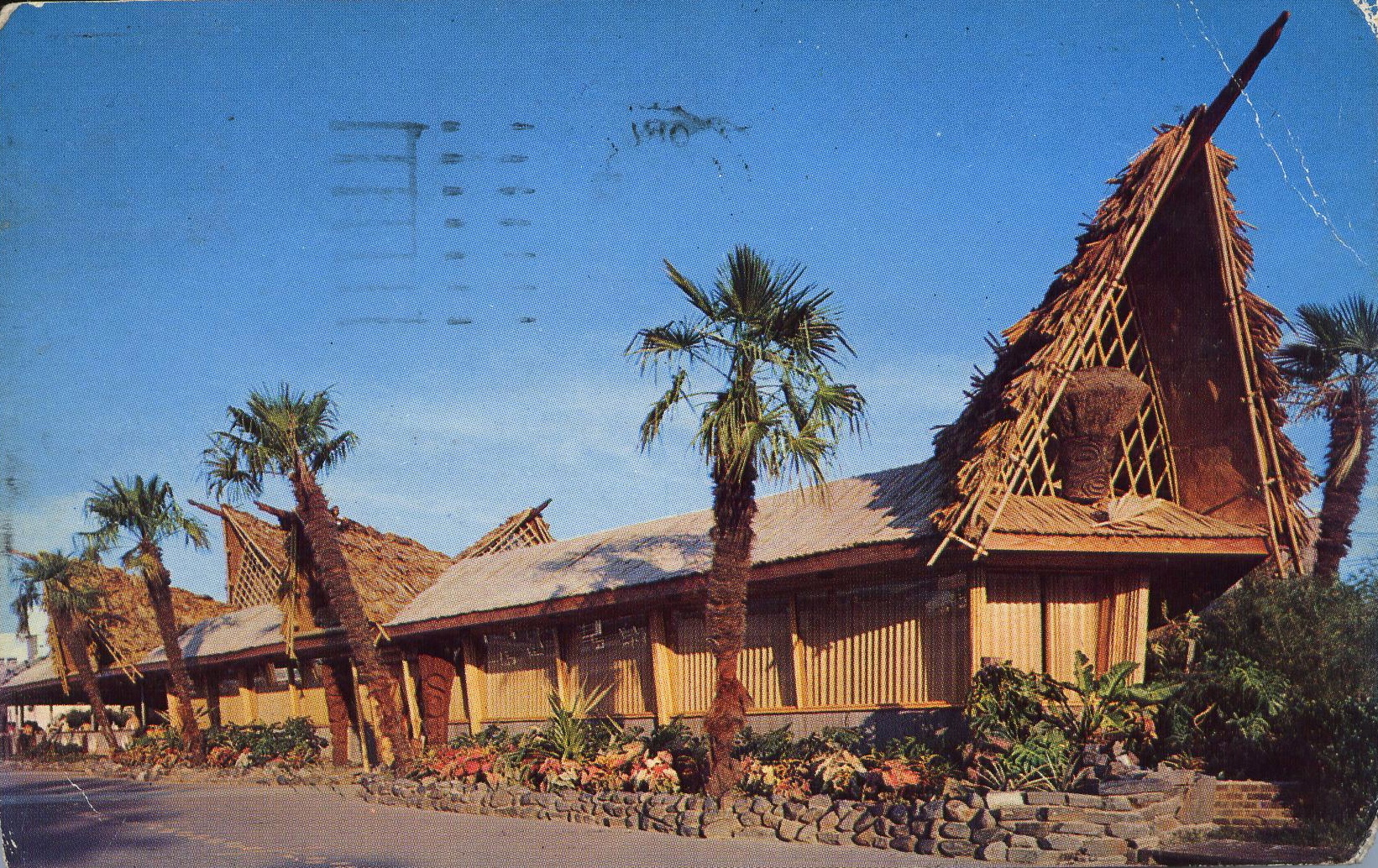
Exterior view of a tiki restaurant in New Orleans (1950s)

The interiors and exteriors of tiki bars often include tiki masks and carvings, hula girl motifs, black velvet paintings, large tropical murals, live plants or palm trees, bamboo, grasscloth, tapa cloth, and similar fabrics, torches, woven fish traps, pufferfish lamps, glass floats, and the use of rock and lava stone. Indoor fountains, waterfalls, or even lagoons are popular features.

Beyond Donn Beach and Victor Bergeron, Stephen Crane was a well known promoter of the early tiki style, and was hired by Sheraton Hotels to design their Kon Tiki chain of establishments to compete with Hilton's Trader Vics. An early menu from his The Luau restaurant in Beverly Hills outlines where he got the materials for its decoration, including "chairs from Hong Kong", "Monkey pod furniture milled in Papaaloa", "structural bamboo hand-wrapped by Philippine craftsmen", "Chinese soapstone", the shells of "man-eating clams from the Indian ocean", and mentioning other materials from Nepa, Niiu, Samoa, Tahiti, Fuji, and of Tonga-Tabu origin.

"Mick" Brownlee was the main wood carver for Donn Beach in Hawaii. After 1956 many designs were also accomplished with original work from the company Oceanic Arts, co-owned by Bob Van Oosting and Leroy Schmaltz in California, which imported materials and did original wood carvings. The tiki aesthetic was also refined by restaurant designers Clif and Lou Sawyer, who took part in over 360 design projects including at The Luau, Don the Beachcomber (Palm Springs, AZ), The Reef (Casper, Wyoming), and the Pago Pago (Tucson, AZ).

Separate side rooms are employed, one of the earliest being "the black hole of Calcutta" as used by Donn Beach. Some of the biggest tiki restaurants are designed as large open air spaces with cavernous ceilings that allowed for the construction of separate areas with exotic names. The "cannibal room", "kon-tiki bar", "scorpion's den", and "trader's hut" could all be collected under one roof. Some like the Chin Tiki were multiple-level affairs, requiring patrons to climb stairs or cross bamboo bridges to get to other sections. The Kahiki Supper Club in Columbus, OH advertised as "The world's most elaborate Polynesian Supper Club" in Life Magazine and even provided its own interior map. This allowed keeping dinner show areas secluded away from more private drinking lounges, and lent to the "experience" by making patrons feel they had been transported away to an entire village. Limited windows or the use of fake windows with dioramas is done for similar reasons.

Live animals are sometimes present. The now closed Bahooka Tiki bar was famous for its over one-hundred fish tanks. The establishment's menu, swizzle sticks, matchbook covers, and cocktail napkins can be important design considerations for tiki bars. These add to the exotic destination and feel for the bar and are taken home by customers where they then become a form of outside advertising.

== Drinks ==
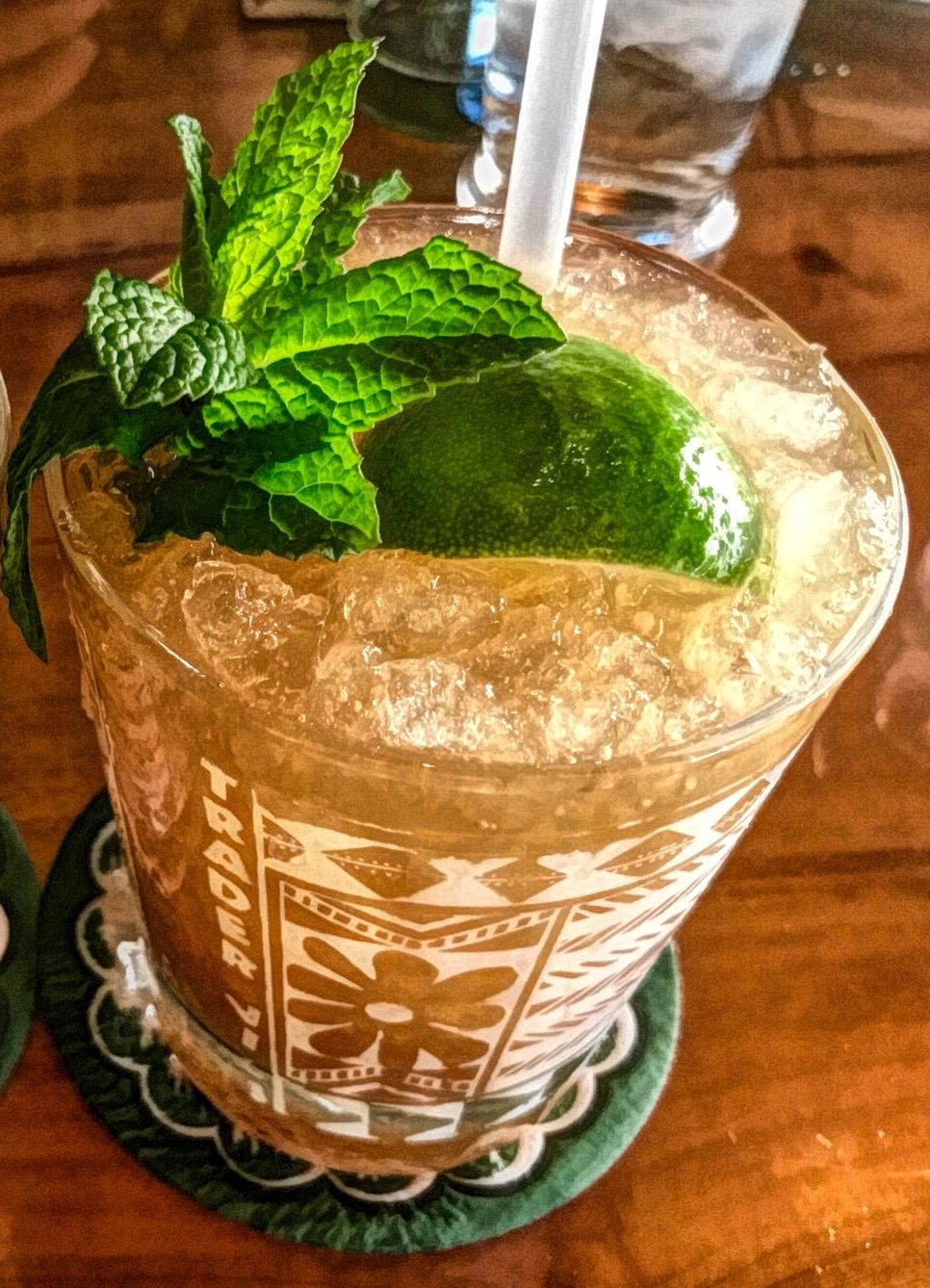
A Mai Tai

A hallmark of tiki bars are specialty drinks, some of which may be unique to a bar and the recipes for which were often carefully guarded in order to prevent imitation from competing bars or from customers trying to recreate a drink at home.

Multiple types of rums (light, dark, spiced, overproof and originating from various countries) are typically mixed together with orange liqueurs (Triple sec, Grand Marnier, Cointreau), tropical fruit juices, sweet syrups (falernum, fassionola, orgeat) and bitters. Many are bright in color, including more unusual cocktail colors such as blue (from Curaçao) and green hues (from Midori or Crème de menthe).

Some classic drink recipes from the early tiki era, many attributed to Don the Beachcomber or Trader Vic, include the:

Blue Hawaii, Cobra's Fang, Coffee Grog, Corpse Reviver, Doctor Funk, Diki-Diki, Fog Cutter, Fu Manchu, Gold Cup, Head Hunter, Mai Tai, Navy Grog, Lapu Lapu, Mr. Bali Hai, Outrigger, Pago Pago, Pearl Diver, Py Yi, Planter's Punch, QB Cooler, Rum Barrel, Scorpion, Shark's Tooth, Shrunken Head, Singapore Sling, Suffering Bastard, Sumatra Kula, Test Pilot, Three Dots & A Dash, and the Zombie.

New tiki drinks continue to be created by a variety of bartenders and others. Jeff "Beachbum" Berry devised two cocktails in honor of new-wave tiki-pioneers Sven Kirsten and Otto Von Stroheim, with the Sven-Tiki and Otto's Grotto cocktails. He is also known from having created the Ancient Mariner and Von Tiki cocktails.

Beyond fruit, cocktails are often garnished for customers with paper cocktail umbrellas, fancy swizzle sticks, live flowers or plastic animals. Cocktails can be very complicated and dramatic, often served in decorated ceramic vessels, employing dry ice or ice shells, or may be set on fire. The ordering of some drinks also triggers a serving ritual, such as the Mystery Drink that could result in the ringing of a gong and a hula dressed "mystery girl" bringing the beverage to the table; the mystery drink was once popular enough that Johnny Carson "ordered" it twice during the filming of The Tonight Show. Some drinks ordered at Disney's Enchanted Tiki Bar also result in certain things happening, such as the ordering of a Krakatoa Punch causing the picture of a faux volcano to erupt.

== Tiki mugs and drink vessels ==
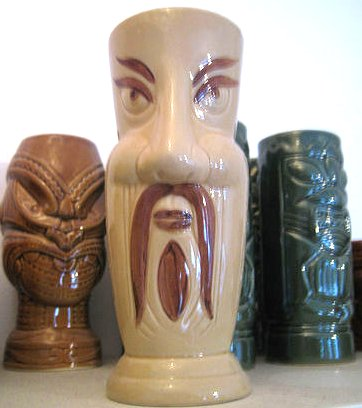
Tiki mugs

As the term is used generically, "tiki mugs" are ceramic drink vessels traditionally shaped as tikis, Easter Island statues (moai), shrunken heads, totems, coconuts, skulls, or in other Hawaiian, exotic, retro, or pirate-themed styles. The name of the bar is often listed on the back of the mug or its bottom. Wood may also be used, typically in the shapes of miniature barrels or boats. For some drinks actual fruit is used, such as hollowed-out pineapples or drilled coconuts with long straws that are used to serve customers.

Although many are much bigger than a typical coffee mug, for drinks that are meant to be shared, larger capacities are required. A Scorpion Bowl (or Kava Bowl) is an oversized cocktail that is served in a large bowl for communal drinking. A variation on the Scorpion Bowl is the Flaming Volcano. Also a communal drink, the Flaming Volcano is traditionally served in a ceramic volcano bowl that has a raised crater reservoir typically filled with a small amount of overproof rum (151 or 160) and carefully lit on fire. Large shells or their ceramic counterparts are also sometimes used for communal drinks, such as in the Chin Tiki Special.

Customers who want to keep a tiki mug can frequently do so for an additional fee. Mugs are often "taken" from the bar as a souvenir or collectible, and some mugs can be quite valuable.

== Outside of the United States ==
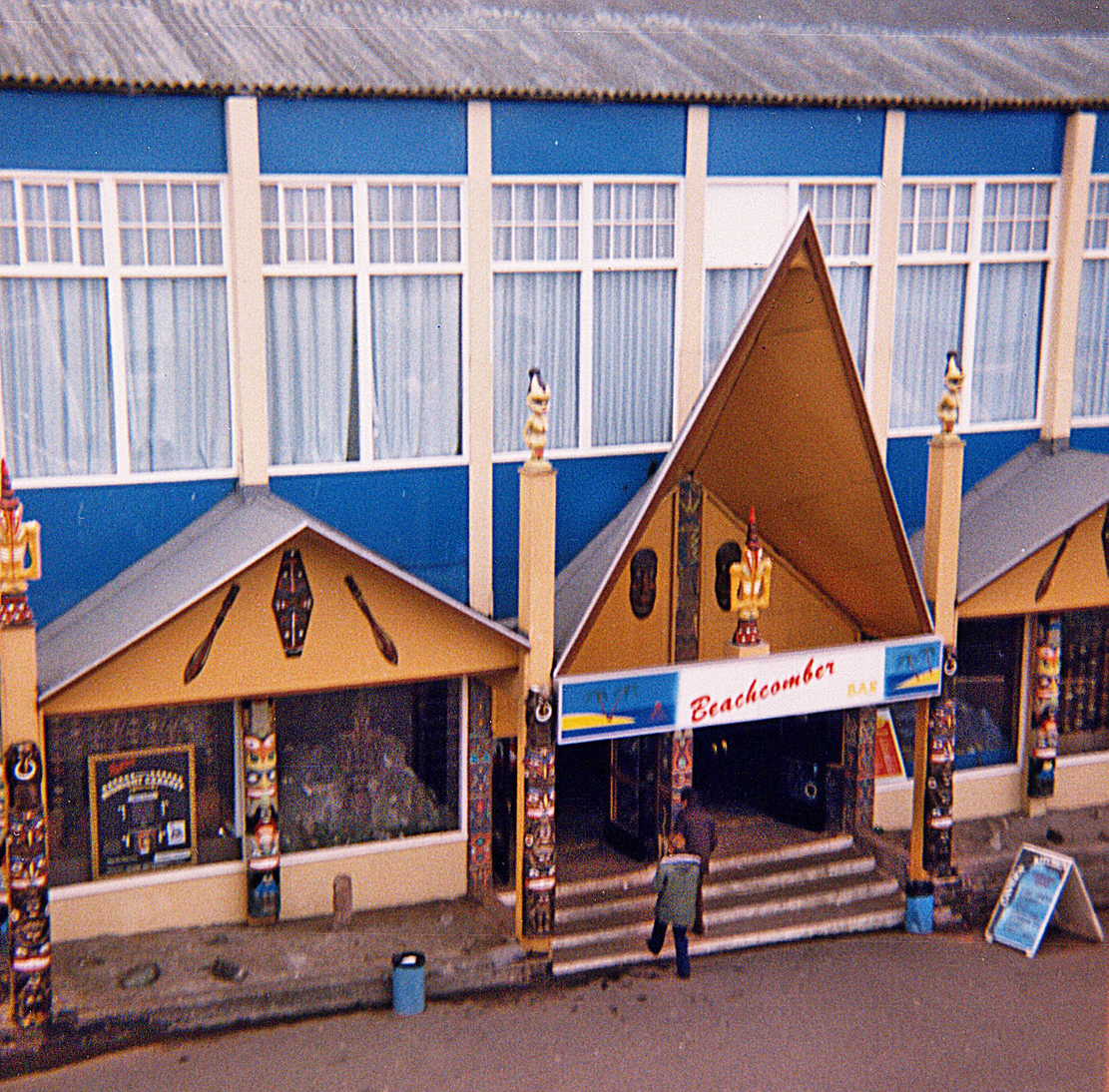
"Beachcomber" Tiki bar in mid 1980s Scotland

Although a largely American creation, tiki bars are not limited to the United States, and many others exist in Canada, the Caribbean, Europe, Asia, and the Middle East, particularly in Germany and the United Kingdom. At least three tiki bars opened in Australia in 2017.

There are at least a dozen Trader Vic's locations in Europe and Asia, including in London, Tokyo, Munich, and Bangkok. The Trader Vic's franchise caters to its local clientele, and in London opened with a London Sour on its cocktail menu in 1965, and its Munich location with a Munich Sour in 1972.

In 2017 noted tiki historians Sven Kirsten, Jeff Berry, Martin Cate, Brian Miller, and Chris Osburn listed their top 15 operating tiki bars in the world and included four in London, one in Munich, one in Tokyo, and one in Barcelona. Other judges included top-rated tiki bars in Paris, Hong Kong, and Berlin.

== Home tiki bars ==
In the wake of commercial tiki bars, during each wave of tiki popularity, home tiki bars were also built. Home bars often serve a dual purpose — to create a recreational space in which to imbibe home-crafted cocktails, and to show off tiki collections of mugs, art, and other artifacts. Home tiki bars are built both inside and outside, sometimes as man caves. Those built outdoors are typically placed in backyard patios but are also erected on the shorelines of boat docks for people living on the water.

Some of these home bars are simple but others are lavish enough to rival their commercial forebears. Not limited to America, many from around the world are uploaded onto internet sites and sometimes even toured.

== See also ==
- Bar
- Disney's Tiki Room
- Drinking-establishment-related articles
- Exoticism
- Kava bar and Kava culture
- Tiki culture
