= Ancient Mariner (cocktail) =

Rum based cocktail

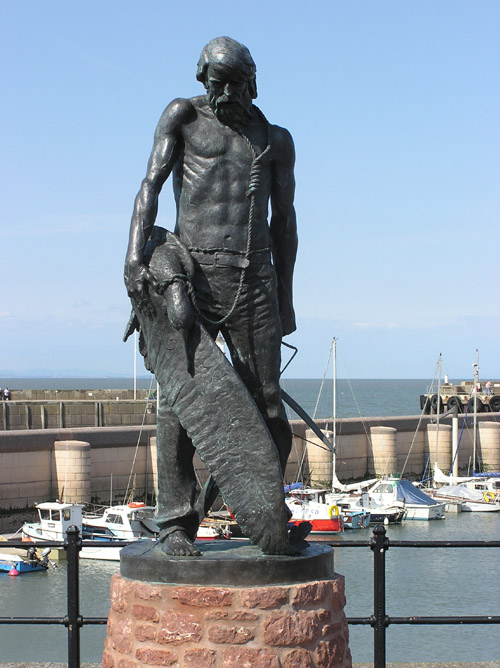
The Ancient Mariner statue at Watchet, Somerset, England

The Ancient Mariner is a tiki drink created by Jeff "Beachbum" Berry and Annene Kaye. It first appeared in their 1998 drink guide Beachbum Berry's Grog Log and is named after Coleridge's 1798 The Rime of the Ancient Mariner because in Berry's words "by the time we finished with it, that's how old we felt."

Its signature ingredient is pimento flavored liqueur, which in the United States is most commonly referred to as "pimento dram" or "allspice dram" due to the conflation of pimento and pimenta. As such it should not be confused with Pimiento pepper liquor or similar alcohols such as those made by Ancho Reyes and others.

== Ingredients ==
The Ancient Mariner recipe calls for:

- 1 oz Demerara rum
- 1 oz dark Jamaican rum
- 1/4 oz Pimento liqueur (pimento dram or allspice dram)
- 3/4 oz fresh lime juice
- 1/2 oz white grapefruit juice
- 1/2 oz sugar syrup

Served with crushed ice and garnished with lime and mint

== See also ==
- List of cocktails
