= Bahooka =

Bar/restaurant in California, USA

Coordinates: 34.0874°N 118.0736°W

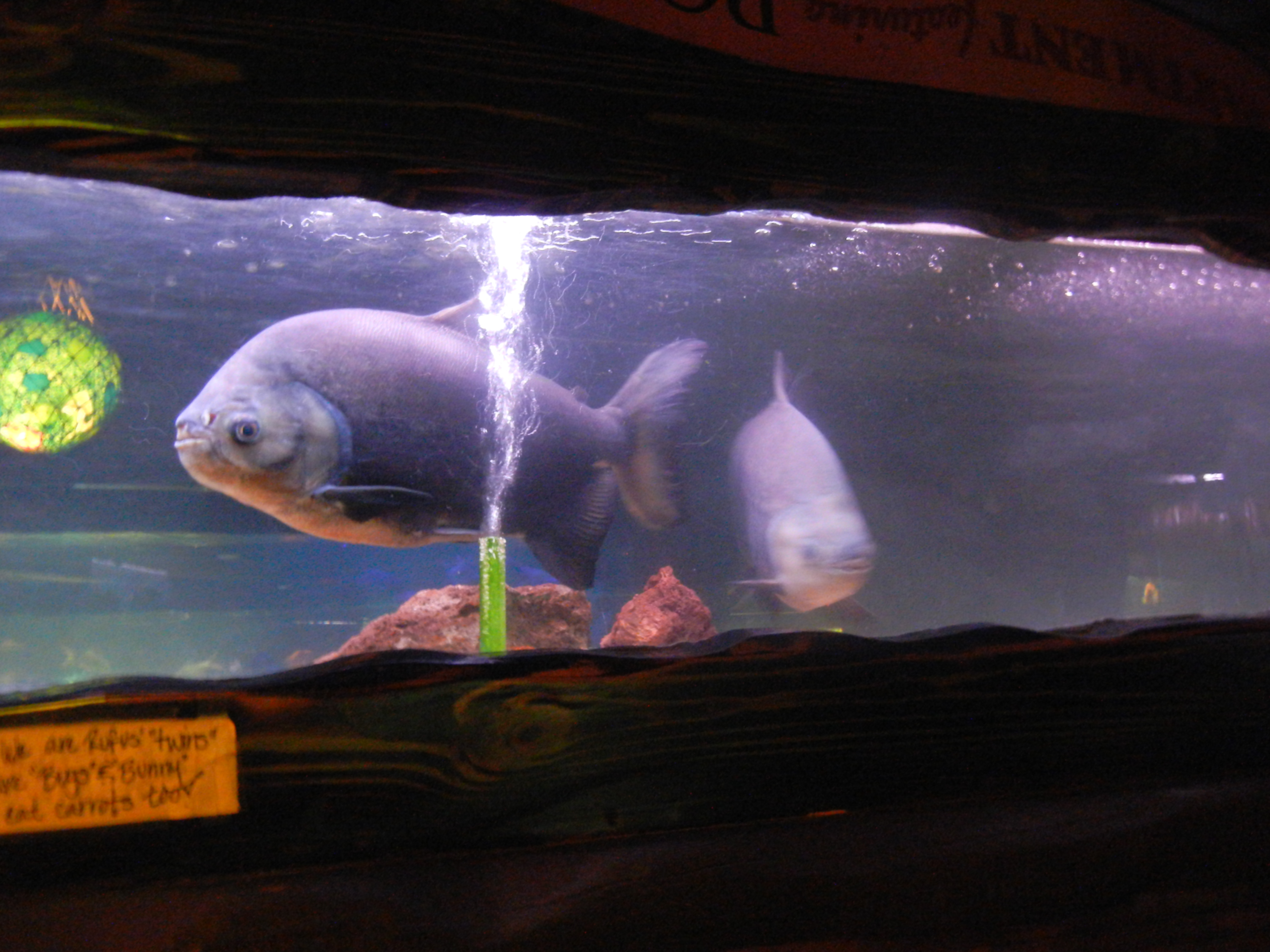
Rufus the fish at the Bahooka Tiki Bar

Bahooka was a Tiki bar and restaurant in Rosemead, California, United States. The Bahooka was well known for its many fish tanks, one of which held a famous and frequently photographed pacu fish named Rufus. The bar was also known for serving over 60 different kinds of Tiki drinks, including their Jolly Roger Bowl and flaming drinks such as the Flaming Honey Bowl and their eponymous Bahooka Bowl. The Bahooka served Polynesian fare such as teriyaki chicken breast and their signature "Exotic Ribs".

== History ==
Bahooka was founded in 1967 in West Covina, California and expanded to a second location at 4501 Rosemead Boulevard in 1976 after losing its lease. This allowed the Rosemead location to expand its dining area, adding a new room as well as more custom wooden/fiberglass aquariums, which then exceeded over 100 aquariums, many over 100 gallons in capacity. Tiki mug producers Tiki Farm created a 40th Anniversary mug for the bar. The Rosemead Bahooka closed in March 2013.

== In popular culture ==
Rufus who was known for eating carrots and for having appeared with Johnny Depp in Fear and Loathing in Las Vegas. Rufus, planned at one time to be transferred to another restaurant in Glendale, will remain at the current site in the new restaurant.

== See also ==
- List of defunct restaurants of the United States
