= Zombie (cocktail) =

Cocktail made of fruit juices and rum

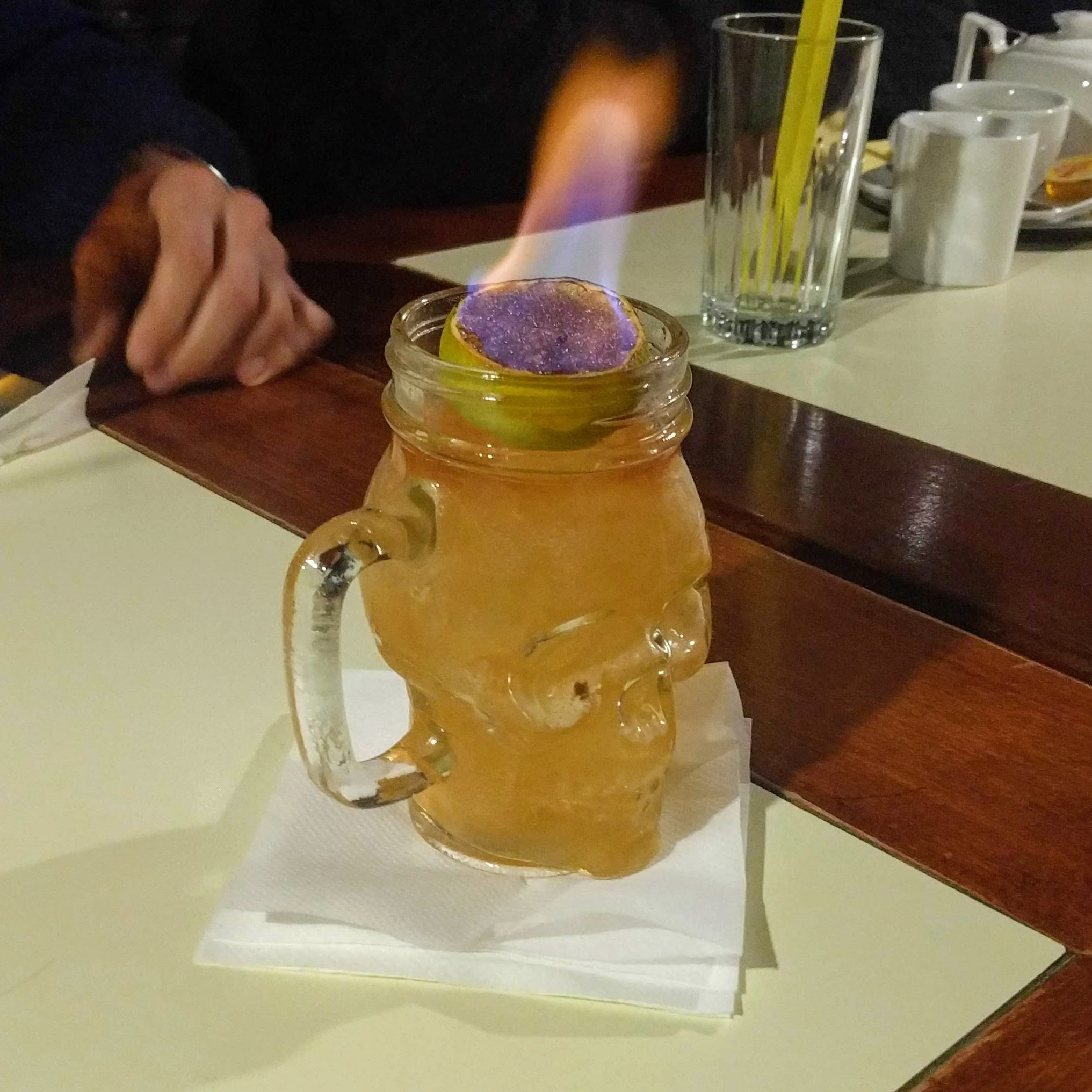
- Type: Cocktail
- Ingredients: 45 mL Jamaican dark rum; 45 mL Puerto Rican gold rum; 30 mL Demerara rum; 20 mL fresh lime juice; 15 mL falernum; 15 mL Don's Mix (2 parts fresh yellow grapefruit juice and 1 part cinnamon syrup); 1 tsp (5 mL) Grenadine syrup; 1 dash Angostura bitters; 6 drops Pernod
- Base spirit: Rum
- Standard drinkware: Beverage glass
- Standard garnish: mint leaves
- Served: On the rocks: poured over ice
- Preparation: Add all ingredients into an electric blender with 170 grams of cracked ice. With pulse button blend for a few seconds. Serve in a tall tumbler glass.

The zombie is a tiki cocktail made of fruit juices, liqueurs, and various rums. It first appeared in late 1934, invented by Donn Beach at his Hollywood Don the Beachcomber restaurant. It was popularized on the East coast soon afterwards at the 1939 New York World's Fair.

== History ==
Legend has it that Donn Beach originally concocted the zombie to help a hung-over customer get through a business meeting. The customer returned several days later to complain that he had been turned into a zombie for his entire trip. Its smooth, fruity taste works to conceal its extremely high alcoholic content. Don the Beachcomber restaurants limited their customers to two zombies apiece because of their potency, which Beach said could make one "like the walking dead."

According to the original recipe, the zombie cocktail included three different kinds of rum, lime juice, falernum, Angostura bitters, Pernod, grenadine, and "Don's Mix", a combination of cinnamon syrup and grapefruit juice.

Beach was very cautious with the recipes of his original cocktails. His instructions for his bartenders contained coded references to ingredients, the contents of which were only known to him. Beach had reason to worry; a copy of the zombie was served at the 1939 New York World's Fair by a man trying to take credit for it named Monte Proser (later of the mob-tied Copacabana).

Beach's original recipes for the zombie and other tiki drinks have been published in Sippin' Safari by Jeff "Beachbum" Berry. Berry researched the origins of many tiki cocktails, interviewing bartenders from Don the Beachcomber's and other original tiki places and digging up other original sources. Sippin' Safari details Beach's development of the zombie with three different recipes dating from 1934 to 1956.

The zombie was occasionally served heated (a drink more commonly known today as the I.B.A. hot zombie), as outlined by the Catering Industry Employee (CIE) journal: "Juice of 1 lime, unsweetened pineapple juice, bitters, 1 ounce heavily bodied rum, 2 ounces of Gold Label rum, 1 ounce of White Label rum, 1 ounce of apricot-flavored brandy, 1 ounce of papaya juice"

The cocktail is named in the lyrics for the song "Haitian Divorce" on the 1976 album The Royal Scam by Steely Dan.

== Preparation ==
Preparing a cocktail consists of adding a glass of ice and all ingredients to a shaker or juicer (except for Rum 151, if it's included in the recipe at all), shaking the closed shaker vigorously for five seconds, and serving in a glass. Then pour the 151 rum over the mixture so that it lies on top of the other ingredients, and finally, garnish the glass with a slice of some fruit of your choice.

== Options ==
One variation on the recipe is to keep the base of the various rum, brandy, and Bacardi varieties and substitute orange, pineapple, lemon, and grenadine juices for the pineapple and papaya juices. Another version is based on giving up brandy and substituting juices from sweeter flavors to more citrusy ones like lemon, pineapple and papaya.

The zombie voodoo cocktail is a variation of the classic zombie cocktail. It contains unique ingredients like absinthe and blackberries that give it a distinctive flavor. This version retains the tropical base of the original zombie, but takes on a slightly different flavor thanks to the added ingredients.

== Tiki culture influence ==
Due to the popularity of the cocktail during the tiki craze, from the 1930s, and the fact that Beach kept his recipe secret and occasionally altered it, there are many variations of the zombie served at other restaurants and bars (some tasting nothing like the original cocktail). The word zombie also began to be used at other tiki themed establishments, such as at the Zombie Hut and Zombie Village.

Trader Vic also listed a recipe for the zombie in his 1947 Bartender's Guide. Other competitors created drinks linked to the zombie. At Stephen Crane's Chicago Kon-Tiki Ports restaurant they featured a drink on the menu called The Walking Dead: "Makes the dead walk and talk. For those who want immediate action – meet the first cousin to the famous 'zombie'. Demerara 151 rum. 90¢."
