= Scorpion bowl =

Mixed alcoholic drink

- Scorpion bowl in a flaming "volcano bowl"
- Type: Mixed drink
- Standard drinkware: Special: Scorpion Bowl
- Standard garnish: Multiple fruits, gardenia flower
- Served: Communally, with straws

Three diners drinking from a basic scorpion bowl with long straws

A Scorpion bowl is a communally shared alcoholic tiki drink served in a large ceramic bowl traditionally decorated with wahine or hula-girl island scenes and meant to be drunk through long straws. Bowl shapes and decorations can vary considerably. Starting off as a single-serve drink known as the Scorpion cocktail, its immense popularity as a bowl drink in tiki culture is attributed to Trader Vic.

The drink contains light rum, brandy, and orgeat syrup along with orange and lemon juice and is typically heavily garnished.

Different versions can have multiple types of rum (overproof, dark and white), gin, wine, and fruit juices. If a sparkling wine "floater" is being added it is normally done last after the other ingredients have been mixed.

== Later variations ==
Separate small ceramic volcanic crater dishes were sometimes later placed inside the center of Scorpion Bowls, turning them into "volcano bowls".

Volcano versions were also rebranded as "The Mystery Drink" at tiki bars including the Kahiki and the Mai Kai,
