= Mr. Bali Hai =

Type of cocktail

- Ingredients: 1 1/2 oz of dark Jamaican rum; 1 oz light Puerto Rican rum; 3/4 oz coffee flavored brandy; 1 1/2 oz pineapple juice (unsweetened); 1 oz lemon juice; 1/2 oz of sugar syrup
- Standard drinkware: Special: Mr. Bali Hai mug
- Standard garnish: Two straws
- Served: Blended with crushed ice

Mr. Bali Hai is a tiki drink served in a special mug at the Bali Hai restaurant on Shelter Island in San Diego, California. The drink has had different recipes over the years, but a prominent version from the 1970s calls for 1 1/2 oz of dark Jamaican rum, 1 oz light Puerto Rican rum, 3/4 oz coffee flavored brandy, 1 1/2 oz unsweetened pineapple juice, 1 oz lemon juice, and 1/2 oz of sugar syrup. The mug has the same name as the drink, Mr. Bali Hai, and comes in the shape of a headhunter's head with a removable lid.

Despite the use of a headhunter themed mug and shared coffee flavored ingredients, the Mr. Bali Hai otherwise bears little resemblance to Trader Vic's flaming Coffee Grog, which was served in a "headhunter cup".

== History ==
The Mr. Bali Hai was the signature drink of the Bali Hai shortly after it opened in 1954, and became synonymous with the Mr. Bali Hai motif that served not just as a mug but also as the restaurant's signage and large entrance way wood carving.

Credible information is not available as to who invented the first Mr. Bali Hai recipe. According to the Bali Hai, "The original mug was manufactured by Otagiri Mug Company and was served with a fabulous concoction of fine spirits brewed by the Bali Hai’s own resident witch doctor! Two holes in the lid made his head a party for two!" Tom Ham was the original and long time owner of the Bali Hai.

Mr. Bali Hai's name is likely a reference to the 1949 musical South Pacific and its famous song, Bali Ha'i, which referred to a mystical tropical island. Shelter Island's Bali Hai website says that Tom Ham renamed the bankrupt [Christian's Hut] restaurant the Bali Hai, which means, “Your own special island”.

The restaurant has been noted by the National Trust for Historic Preservation. The entrance way statue carving of Mr. Bali Hai was restored in 2001.

== Variations ==
Although the Mr. Bali Hai cocktail is synonymous with the Bali Hai restaurant, the drink is still served at other tiki establishments where it retains its noted coffee flavored profile.

Because coffee flavored brandy can be harder to find, when made at home the drink is often crafted instead with more common rum-based coffee liquors, such as Tia Maria or Kahlúa.

A newer version being served at the Bali Hai uses blackberry brandy instead of coffee brandy. The new flavors as first described on a 2007 menu include: pineapple juice, sweet & sour, blackberry, Ron Rico light rum, and Lemon Hart 151 proof rum.
