= Zombie Hut =

- Advertisement showing the exterior of the Zombie Hut in 1968

Restaurant information
- Established: 1945
- Closed: 1990
- Previous owners: Johnny Quaresma, Ed and Beatrice Hill, Bruce Brooks
- Head chef: Ed Hill
- Chef: Terry Simonsen
- Food type: American, Polynesian and Hawaiian
- Dress code: Formal
- Location: 5635 Freeport Blvd, Sacramento, California, United States
- Other locations: Brooklyn, New York

The Zombie Hut was a Hawaiian/Polynesian-themed restaurant, nightclub and Tiki bar in Sacramento, California. Opened in 1945 after the end of WWII and continuing for 45 years until its closing in 1990, the restaurant was located on Freeport Blvd. between Florin Road and Sutterville Road. Inspired by the 1930s Tiki craze, the restaurant was owned by Johnny Quaresma from 1945 to 1952 when Ed and Beatrice Hill purchased the business. The Hills eventually sold the Zombie Hut to Bruce Brooks, who owned it until its closing in 1990.

== Background ==
Tiki bars began to become popular in the 1930s and then became a prominent part of the 1940s and 60s cocktail culture. Sacramento had a number of these Polynesian-themed establishments until the fad faded and all eventually closed. The financial crisis of the Great Depression caused a need for escapism that allowed the tiki culture to provide an ease for California customers. In the early 1930s tiki pioneer Donn Beach created the Zombie cocktail in California, which became famous on the East coast when Monte Proser sold the drink at his bar during the 1939 World's Fair. In 1945, the comedy duo of Brown and Carney filmed Zombies on Broadway which depicted this 1930s Tiki craze, using a fictitious nightclub in New York City called the Zombie Hut.

After World War II, the war's end saw many sailors returning from their duties in the Pacific. Polynesian culture had begun to take root in the US through such things as James A. Michener's Tales of the South Pacific and its subsequent musical and film adaption, as well as Don the Beachcomber opening in Hollywood. The war had helped to create a national interest in Polynesian food and décor. The tiki culture continued, spurred on by Hawaii's statehood in 1959 and Disney's opening of the Enchanted Tiki Room in 1963 as well as popular film and television shows like "Hawaiian" Eye" in 1959 and Elvis Presley's Blue Hawaii in 1961. In 1943 Yubi Separovich and Frank Radich opened The Tropics nightclub in Sacramento at 1019 ½ J St. which, apparently, inspired the Zombie Hut.

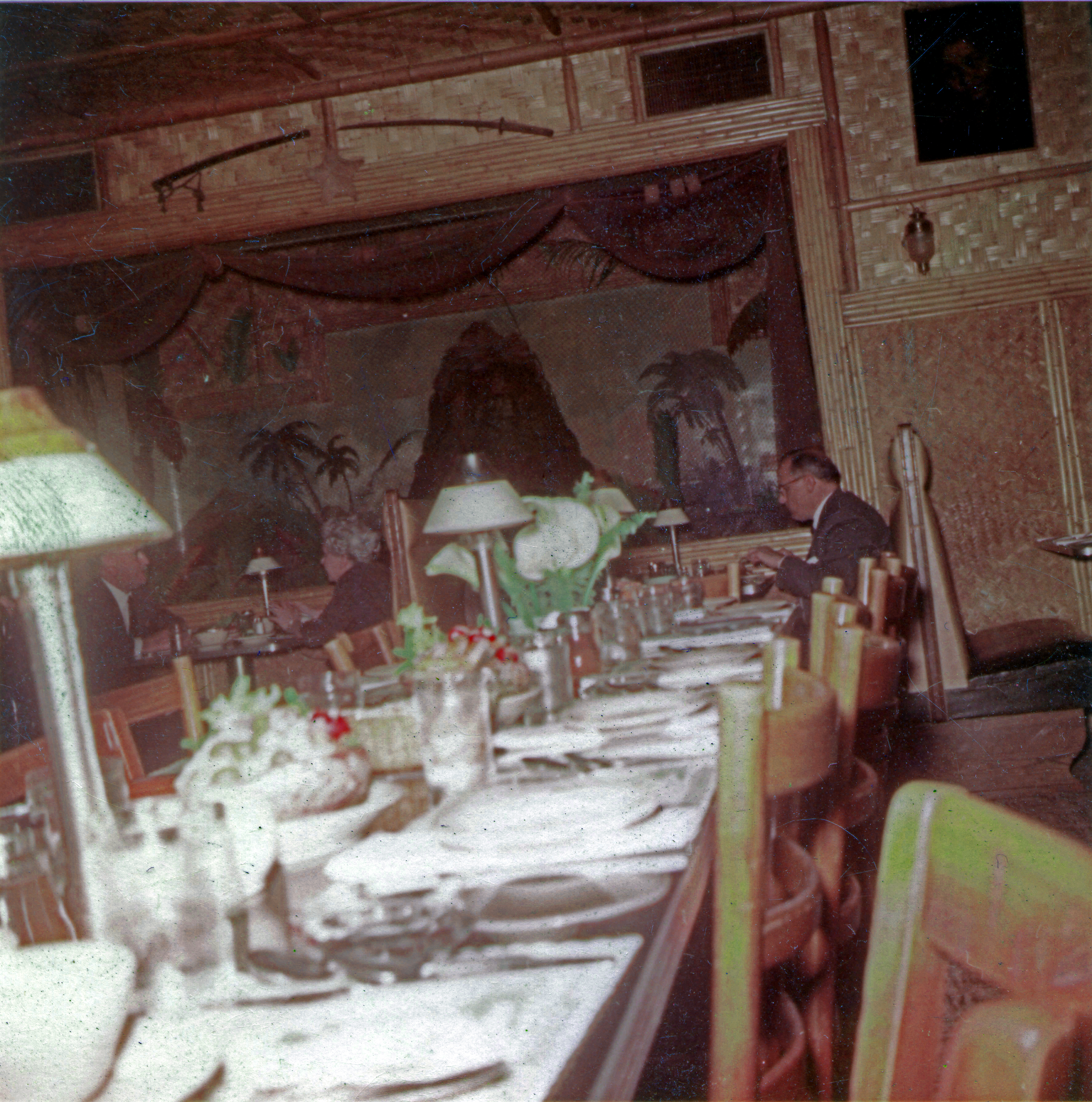
Interior of the Sacramento Zombie Hut in 1958

== Restaurant ==
The Asiatic-Pacific Theater brought south sea dining to Sacramento with such restaurants as Tiki Village, Bob's Tiki and Maleville's Coral Reef. Along with these restaurants was another Hawaiian themed nightclub called the Zombie Hut.

=== Owners and interior décor ===
In 1945 Johnny Quaresma (known to locals as Johnny Christmas) opened the Zombie Hut in a less developed area between Sutterville Road and Florin Road. The restaurant was near William Land Park and, at the time of its opening, there were few other businesses nearby. Located at 5635 Freeport Blvd. the restaurant drew in large crowds for years with Polynesian dancers and Hawaiian singers and musicians. Residents in the area remember having dinner at the Zombie Hut and then seeing a show at Sacramento's Music Circus. While it is not known for certain if Quaresma had a partner, he sold the restaurant in 1952 to Ed Hill and started another restaurant called the Hawaiian Hut in West Sacramento. Ed Hill was a veteran of World War II, having served in the U.S. Navy in the South Pacific.

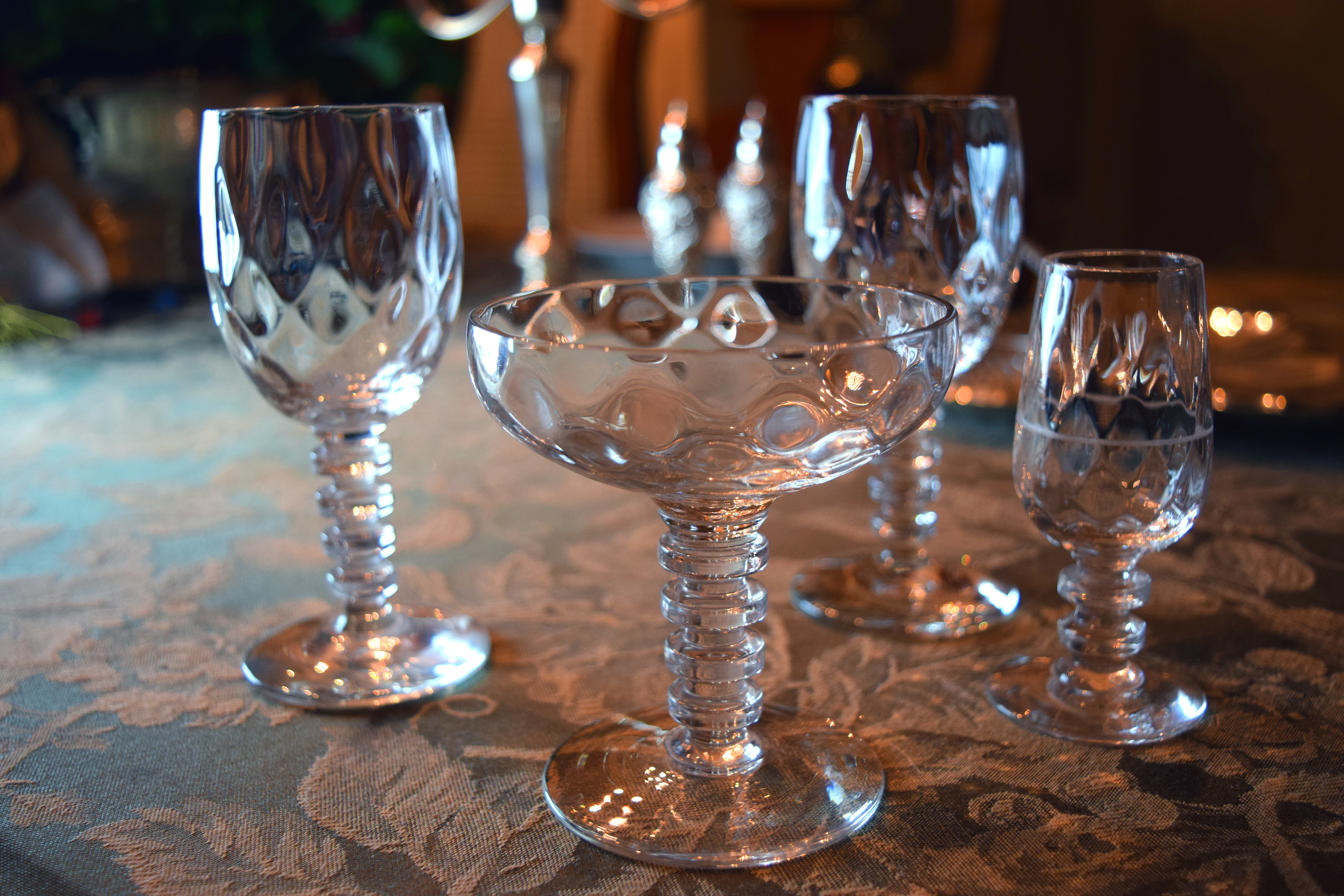
Bryce Brothers, Tiki style cocktail glasses from the Sacramento Zombie Hut

New owners, Ed and Beatrice Hill hired architect Leonard Starks in 1954 to assist in the interior décor's remodel. Mr. Starks was best known for his theatre design which included the Alhambra Theater in Sacramento, where its 1927 opening featured the first talking picture on the west coast. The interior had bamboo décor with thatched roof, blowfish lamps to light tables, canoes hanging from the ceiling and Hawaiian themed art, masks and tiki idols as well as stuffed animal trophies from Quaresma and Hill's hunting trips. The restaurant served quality cuisine that included prime rib, steak, scampi, scallops, lobster and roast pig on the weekends and special events.

Eventually the Hills would sell the restaurant to Bruce Brooks a California entrepreneur who owned Capitol Oil and Mercantile Bank. Brooks would often be seen playing the piano and singing as an amateur entertainer at the restaurant after his purchase. The restaurant underwent drastic changes; the theme to Love Boat and disco became prevalent, the Polynesian entertainment ended and the fine dining was replaced by a fast food menu and opened only on the weekends until eventually closing in 1990.

=== Tiki bar and nightclub ===
The Zombie Hut had Polynesian music and dance from at least 1963. Albert Fakalata was a student who had first come to the United States in 1959 to study in Hawaii where he helped build and open the Polynesian Cultural Center in Laie, Hawaii. In 1963 he was visiting with friends in Sacramento and asked where he could find Hawaiian Food. He was quickly directed to the Zombie Hut where he was surprised to see torches outside and a themed restaurant just like Trader Vic's. He and his friends immediately knew they wanted to work there. They were asked to perform that night with the Lee sisters from Hawaii, accompanied by their brother Fred Lee on drums, and were hired on the spot. Fakalata worked at the restaurant for two years before returning to Tonga but returned to the US in 1974 touring as a musician through Nevada and California before being asked by the Hills to return to the Zombie Hut as the general manager and entertainer. The entertainment included the Royal Polynesians who Fakalata referred to as his Hula Lovelies.

== Legacy ==
After September 11, 2001, along with the war on terror and the fear of traveling, a new need for escapism allowed Tiki culture to begin a comeback, especially in New York. Several Tiki bars and restaurants opened in 2002 including one in Brooklyn, New York by Renee McClure called the Zombie Hut. McClure was inspired by the old Sacramento Zombie Hut, opening her tiki bar in August 2002.

Albert Fakalata and many of the Royal Polynesian dancers continued on as Aloha Polynesia, a local Sacramento based Polynesian dance company with Sakalata as lead muisican.
