= Clif and Lou Sawyer =

American architect

Cliff and Lou Sawyer
- Known for: architecture Graphic design
- Notable work: Luau in Beverly Hills, Don the Beachcomber in Palm Springs.
- Movement: Modernism

Clifton Sawyer (né Howard; February 17, 1896 – March 1, 1966) and Lou Sawyer (April 26, 1905 – May 4, 1995) were an American husband and wife architectural design team who specialized in the creation of twentieth century Polynesian exotica for tiki bars and restaurants. Most of their work was done in the western United States, primarily in Southern California and Arizona.

== Life ==
Clif Sawyer was born 1896 in Boston, Massachusetts and Lou Sawyer was born 1905 in the Basque region of Spain. The couple met in Paris.

They moved to California in the early 1930s and started an interior design company together, creating many memorable exotic interiors during the mid-twentieth century and influencing American interior design while popularizing the tiki movement. In 1966, Cliff Sawyer died and Lou Sawyer carried on the business, completing her 368th job by 1968. She died in 1995.

Their projects included Don the Beachcomber in Palm Springs, The Luau in Beverly Hills, the Pago Pago Lounge in Tucson, the Lanai in San Mateo, and The Reef in Casper, Wyoming.
