= Tiki Ti =

Tiki bar in Los Angeles, California

Coordinates: 34°5′50.9″N 118°17′8.8″W

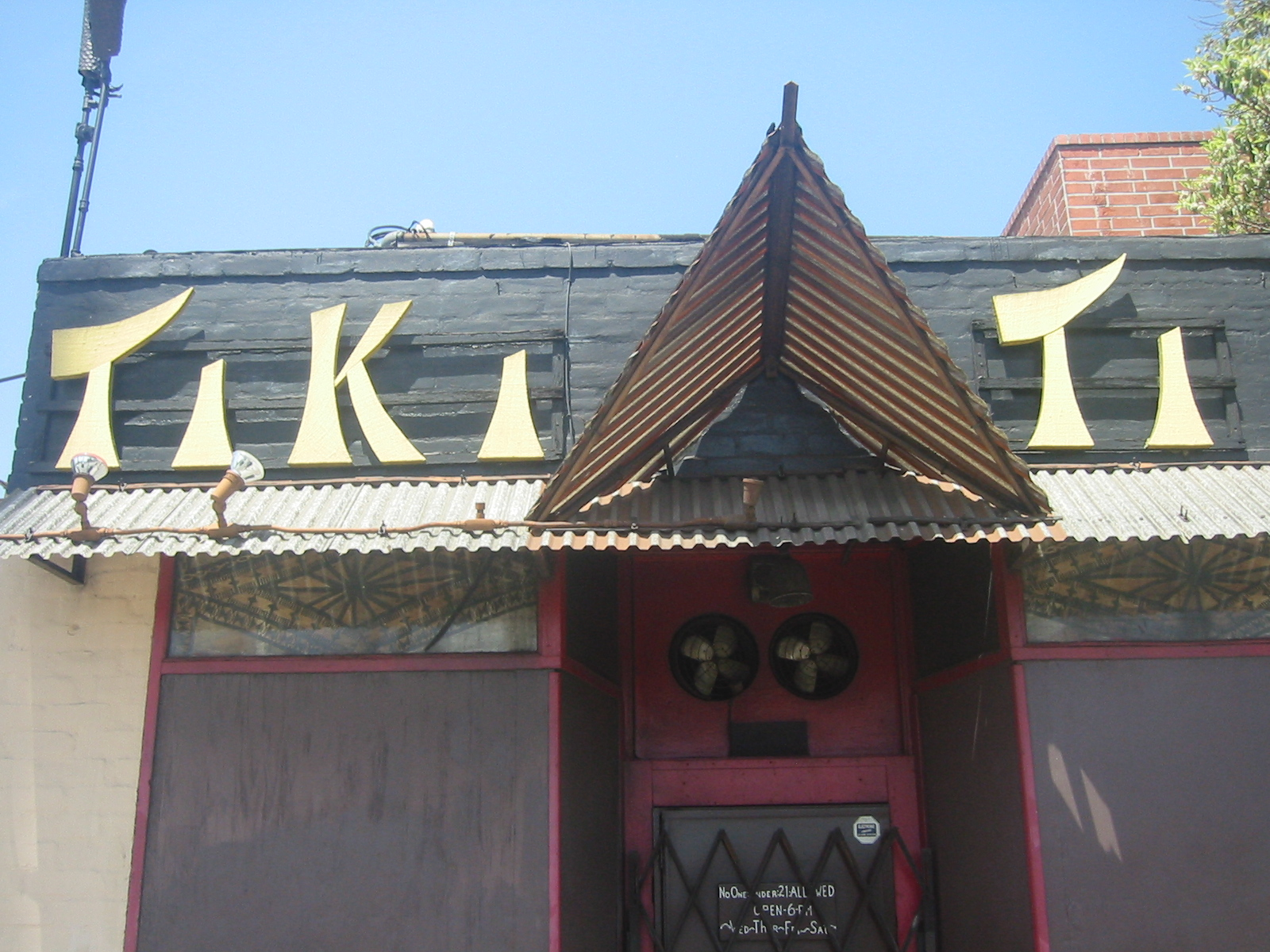
- Industry: Bar
- Founded: April 28, 1961
- Founder: Ray Buhen
- Headquarters: 4427 Sunset Blvd., Los Feliz, Los Angeles, California, United States
- Website: tiki-ti.com

The Tiki Ti is a Polynesian-themed tiki bar at 4427 Sunset Boulevard in the Los Feliz district of Los Angeles.

== History ==
Tiki-Ti was established on April 28, 1961 by Ray Buhen. The bar's only employees, Mike Sr. and Mike Jr. Buhen, are also the sole owners and the son and grandson of the founder. The bar is a well-known underground landmark, often serving as a prelude stop before patrons attend clubs in the Silverlake/Hollywood area.

== Menu ==
The Tiki-Ti bartenders are known for their "heavy" pours and specialty drinks like the Blood and Sand, for which patrons synchronously yell "Toro, Toro, Toro" while the drink is topped off with tequila, an homage to the 1941 Tyrone Power film about bullfighting. The other chanting drink is the Uga Booga for which patrons yell "uga booga" as the drink is being prepared.

Although the Tiki-Ti does not serve typical bar cocktails (such as the martini, the cosmopolitan or beer), the drink menu does consist of 94 exotic drinks, many of which are originals. Drink names include Yellow Bird, Laka Nuki, Bayanihan, Bonnie & Clyde, and the Missionary's Downfall. The strongest drink is purported to be the Stealth. For those who cannot decide what drink to choose, the bar offers a wheel that patrons can spin to help them make up their minds.

== See also ==
- Mai-kai restaurant
