= Mai-Kai Restaurant =

- U.S. National Register of Historic Places
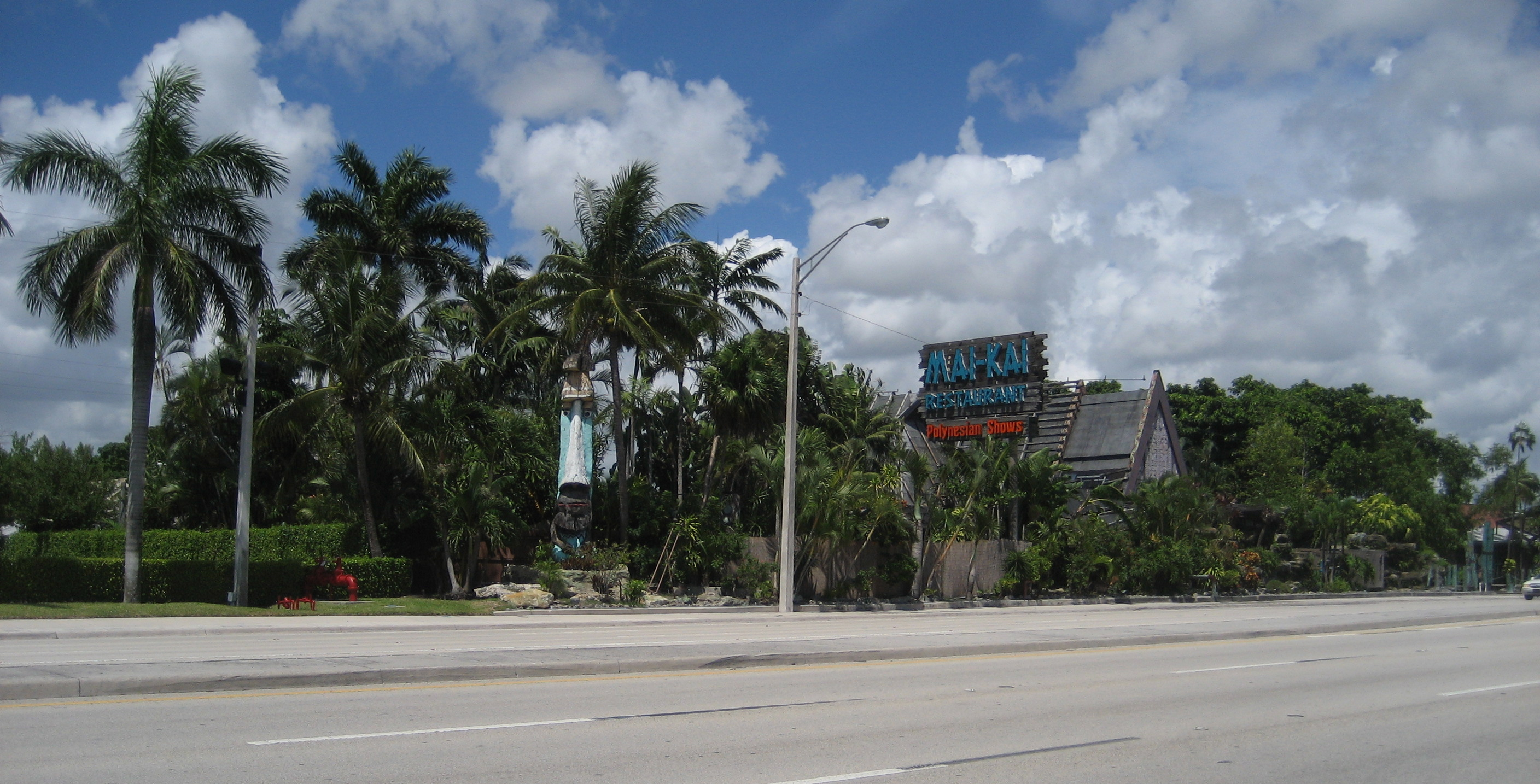
- Mai-Kai Restaurant in 2007
- Interactive map of Mai-Kai Restaurant
- Location: 3599 N. Federal Hwy. Oakland Park, Florida
- Coordinates: 26°10′20.856″N 80°07′11.19″W
- Area: 1.3 acres (0.53 ha)
- Built: 1956
- Built by: Bob and Jack Thornton
- Architect: Charles F. McKirahan Sr.
- Website: maikai.com
- NRHP reference No.: 14000951
- Added to NRHP: 18 November 2014

The Mai-Kai is a Polynesian-themed restaurant and tiki bar in Oakland Park, Florida. It opened to the public on December 28, 1956, and is one of the few "Grand Polynesian Palaces of Tiki" still in operation today. In 2015 it was named the "best tiki bar in the world" by Critiki, an organization of fans of Polynesian pop culture. It is the last restaurant in existence carrying on the traditions of service and serving the original drink recipes of Don the Beachcomber, and has been listed on the National Register of Historic Places.

== History ==
The Mai-Kai was created by brothers Bob and Jack Thornton. They visited Don the Beachcomber in Chicago as children and even at that young age said they wanted to open a similar place. While attending college at Stanford University they often visited Trader Vic's restaurant in San Francisco. In 1955 after completing service in the armed forces, the brothers settled in Fort Lauderdale, Florida. Still less than 30 years old, they decided to open a Polynesian restaurant in an undeveloped area of Oakland Park, a suburb of Fort Lauderdale. Although the area seemed remote at first – "the middle of nowhere on U.S. 1" – a tourist industry was growing in Florida in the 1950s, and both cities were undergoing rapid residential expansion, so that the restaurant immediately developed a clientele of both locals and tourists.

The original restaurant was designed by architect Charles F. McKirahan Sr. and decorated by Wayne Davidson. It cost $350,000 to complete, making it the most expensive restaurant built in the US that year. It earned more than a million dollars in its first year. It quickly became one of the top-grossing restaurants in the United States, and for many years it sold more rum than any other location in Florida. When the brothers opened the Mai-Kai they hired away number 2 chef Lin Ark Lee, known as Kenny Lee, number 2 bartender Mariano Licudine, maitre d' Andy Tanato and seating captain and purchasing agent Robert Van Dorpe from the Chicago Don the Beachcomber, along with many staff members. Van Dorpe became the first general manager of the Mai-Kai.

The original restaurant contained five dining rooms and a 19-seat "Surfboard Bar" made of surfboards. Originally the roof of the Garden seating area was open. The constant nuisance of moving guests out of the rain caused them to enclose the roof with glass. That glass roof was opened and closed until maintenance issues kept it closed.

In 1970, Jack Thornton sold his interest in the Mai-Kai to his brother Bob after he was struck ill by an aneurysm. Bob then expanded the restaurant, more than doubling its capacity. Bob died in 1989. As of 2014 the restaurant was run by Bob's stepson David Levy as CEO and his stepdaughter Kulani Thornton Gelardi as CFO.

In 2020, the Mai-Kai building closed following flooding caused by a burst pipe. The restaurant continued to host some outdoor gatherings. New partners started a $20 million renovation the building in 2023 and it reopened in November 2024. The new owners say it is a Polynesian venue, not a tiki bar.

== The restaurant ==
The main building is one story with a large A-frame thatched roof. A wooden slat bridge is crossed to reach the porte cochere and entrance. The Mai-Kai has been expanded several times, largely achieving its present layout and appearance by 1971. It now includes eight dining rooms, a bar, a stage in the center of the restaurants to showcase the Polynesian Islander Revue floor show, a gift shop, and tropical gardens. The interior is decorated with nautical and South Sea artifacts.

The largest renovation started in 1970 and took two years to complete. Even during construction projects, the Mai-Kai never closed, and the owners stipulated that the work must be done in such a way that customers could not see or hear it. This often meant the work was done in the wee hours of the morning. In 2009 the restaurant completed a several-years-long renovation to repair damage from Hurricanes Katrina and Wilma.

The current Mai-Kai is much like it was in the 1970s. The waitresses at the Mai-Kai's Molokai Bar are attired in bikini tops and wraparound sarongs. The menu maintains a Polynesian-Asian theme, and the cocktail menu (designed by Mariano Licudine) is largely unchanged since 1956.

== The Polynesian show ==
The Mai-Kai Islanders Revue opened in 1962, with two performances a night. Mireille Thornton was an early dancer in the show, later marrying Bob Thornton. By 1970 she was the choreographer, talent recruiter, and costume designer for the show. As she was born and raised in Tahiti, she was able to create authentic South Pacific dances and costumes. The Mai-Kai Islanders Revue is the longest running Polynesian show in the United States.

== The Mai-Kai Gardens ==
The Mai-Kai has taken advantage of the year-round growing season and tropical climate to its fullest advantage. The surrounding gardens feature walking paths through tropical vegetation, simulated rock formations, waterfalls, ponds, and Tiki statues. Some of the palms and orchids are over fifty years old. On June 8, 2009, a massive carving by Barney West that stood in the gardens for decades collapsed. It was replaced by a piece that had stood in the original Surfboard Bar in 1956.

== Polynesian artifacts ==
The Mai-Kai contains many genuine Polynesian artifacts, some that are over 100 years old. Much of the original collection of Polynesian artifacts was donated to the Thortons' alma mater, Stanford University, in the 1970s. Another part of the collection was donated to the Fort Lauderdale art museum. An insurance appraisal put such a high value on the artifacts that it made the Mai-Kai virtually uninsurable.

== See also ==
- National Register of Historic Places listings in Broward County, Florida
