= Hurricane (cocktail) =

Rum-based cocktail

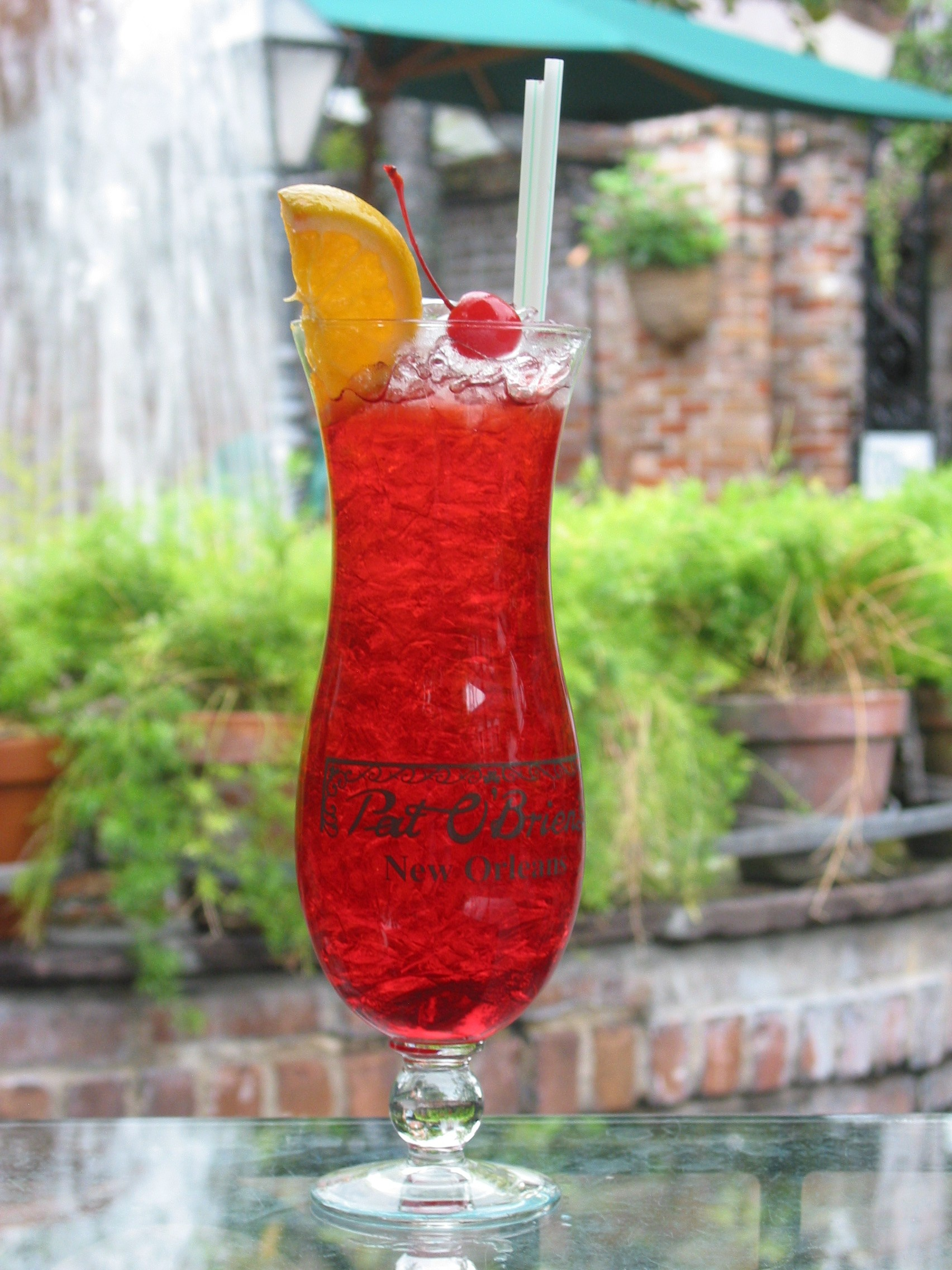
- A hurricane served in the typical glass at Pat O'Brien's, New Orleans
- Type: Cocktail
- Ingredients: One part dark rum; One part white rum; Half part over proofed rum; Passion fruit syrup or fassionola; Lemon juice
- Base spirit: Rum
- Standard drinkware: Hurricane glass
- Served: On the rocks: poured over ice
- Preparation: Shake ingredients with ice, then pour into the glass and serve over ice.

The Hurricane cocktail is a sweet alcoholic drink made with rum, lemon juice, and either passion fruit syrup or fassionola. It is one of many popular drinks served in New Orleans. It is traditionally served in the tall, curvy hurricane glass.

== History ==
The oldest known references to the Hurricane cocktail date the drink's creation back to at least 1935. In "The Tampa Daily Times" newspaper a section from the "Old Mr. Boston Official Bartender's Guide" was printed containing a recipe for the Hurricane cocktail consisting of equal parts of whiskey, dry gin, and creme de menthe, with the addition of the juice from two lemons shaken well with cracked ice, strained and served in a cocktail glass. A few years later the drink was made more commonly with rum, as depicted in the 1938 produced/1939 released Warner Bros. film Naughty But Nice,"The Hartford Courant" Page 14, 6/29/1939 where the Hurricane drink appears to be simply lemonade or lemon juice with the addition of a generous portion of rum with little or nothing else added to it that would give it any appearance different from lemonade. The Hurricane’s similar appearance to ordinary lemonade plays a major role in the film's comical storyline as it often gets mixed up. In 1939 in Queens, New York, it was served at the 1939-1940 New York World's Fair at the "Hurricane Bar" but it is unknown what ingredients were used to prepare the Hurricane drinks that were sold at the exhibition. Throughout the 1940s, different variations of the drink began to form.

The most popular association the Hurricane has today is with the Pat O'Brien's chain of bars and restaurants, and particularly their original New Orleans location creation of the passion fruit-flavored relative of the daiquiri is credited to New Orleans tavern owner Pat O'Brien. The bar allegedly started as a speakeasy called Mr. O'Brien's Club Tipperary and the password was "storm's brewin'".

During the 1940s, O'Brien needed to create a new drink to help him get rid of all of the less-popular rum that local distributors forced him to buy before he could get a few cases of more popular liquors such as scotch and other whiskeys.

He poured the concoction into hurricane lamp–shaped glasses and gave it away to sailors. The drink caught on, and it has been a mainstay in the French Quarter ever since.

== See also ==
- List of cocktails
- Queen Mary (beer cocktail)
