= Fábrica Santo António =

Factory in Funchal, Madeira

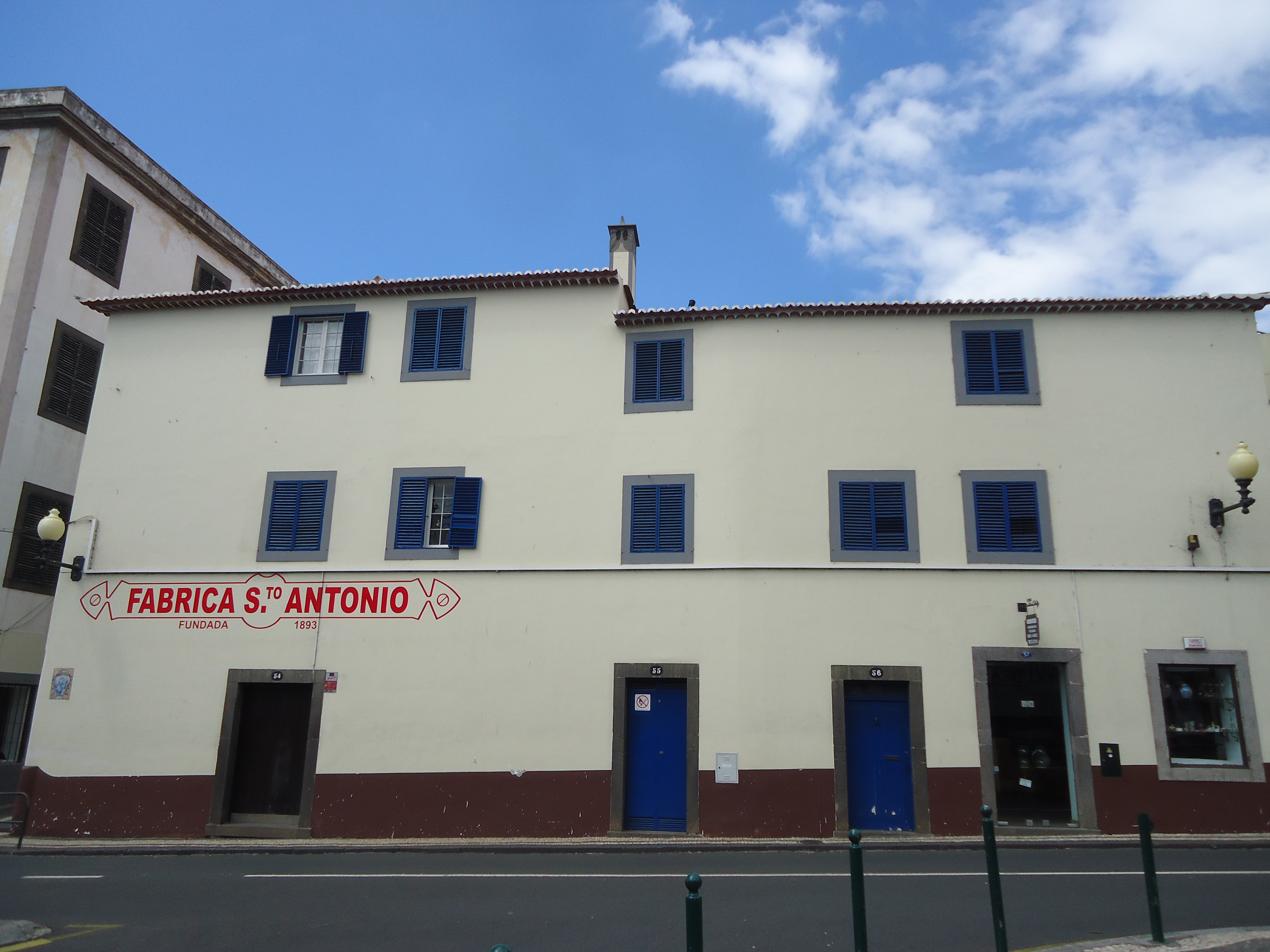
- Company type: Family Owned Business
- Industry: Food
- Founded: 1893; 133 years ago
- Founder: Francisco Roque Gomes da Silva
- Headquarters: Funchal, Autonomous Region of Madeira
- Area served: Portugal
- Website: fabricastoantonio.com

Fábrica Santo António is the name of a biscuit-making company based in Funchal, Madeira, Portugal, which is Portuguese brand of biscuits and related confectionery owned by the same family who has founded it. Fábrica Santo António markets in the Madeira and Portugal.

== History ==
Francisco Roque Gomes da Silva established the first biscuit factory in Madeira in 1893. Francisco Roque recognized an opportunity to create a domestic product without relying on the foreign market by capitalizing on the imported tradition of consuming cookies and cookies at tea time, during a time when English families were heavily present in Madeiran society and ultimately influenced customs.

He then proceeded to bake his own biscuits, placing particular emphasis on the preparation method and the quality of the ingredients.

His wife Guilhermina has expanded the factory's recipe repertoire over time, incorporating family recipes that have persisted for generations and transcended generations; the factory is now in its fifth generation.

=== Establishment ===
The factory is situated on Travessa do Forno in the center of Funchal, where a communal oven that had been converted in the 19th century to house the cookie factory at the outset of the endeavor originally stood.

The factory, and only store, are still located in the Travessa do Forno where it produces all their products. The biscuit production is still ensured by the same machines as in 1893. imported from England from the Sperling & Williams.

=== Accolades and honours ===
Fábrica Santo António was award the title "Loja com História" (lit. Shop with History) by the Funchal City Council, keeping the same building, with the same layou and historial decor.

== Present ==
Fábrica Santo António still produces, following the founder's wife recipes, the typical cookies, biscuits, including Maria, and the traditional fennel candy (one of the oldest sweet regional products), a staple in traditional confectionery.

However recent decades, the range of flavors has expanded to include candies made with ginger, sugarcane molasses, honey, and fruits such as passion fruit, tangerine, mango, and banana. Fábrica Santo António also produces fruit jams, including marmalade, made from local fruits.
