= French Quarter =

French Quarter Vieux Carré (French)
- Neighborhood
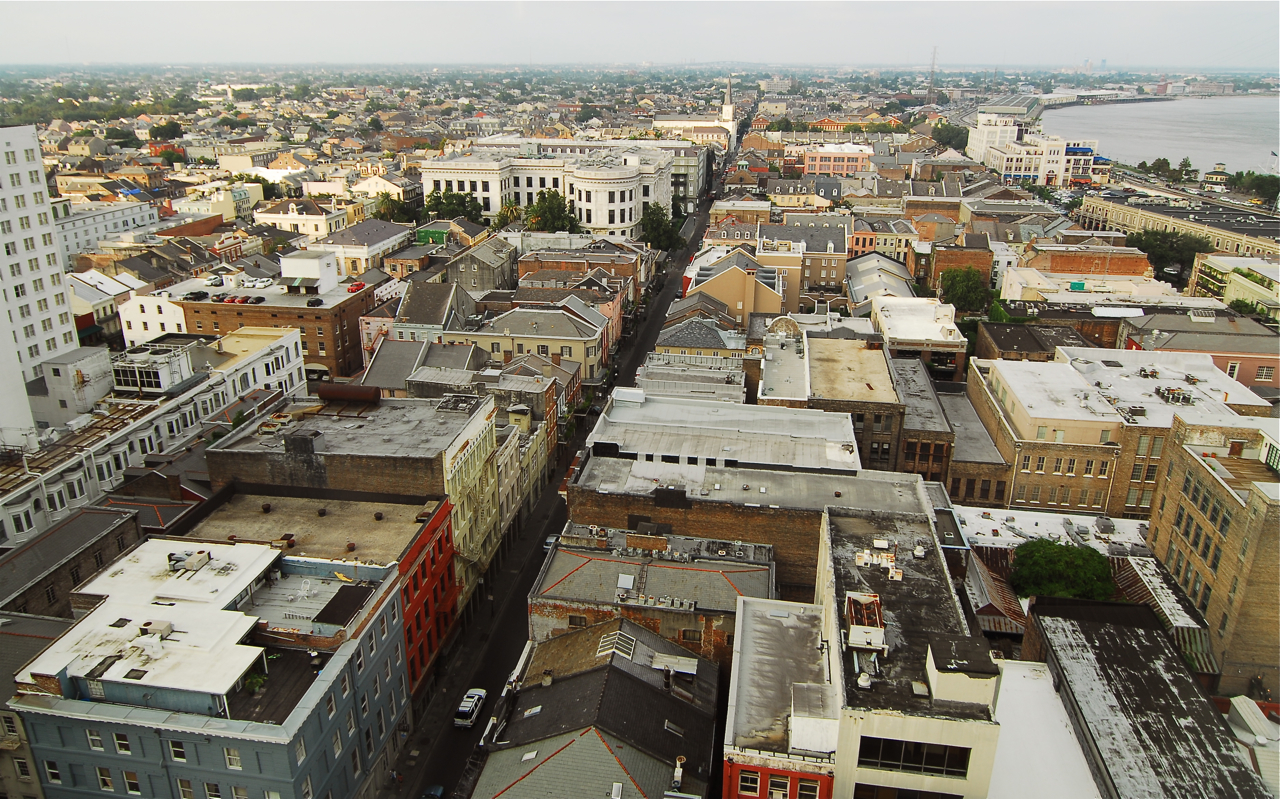
- The French Quarter, looking north with Mississippi River to the right
- Interactive map of French Quarter
- Coordinates: 29°57′31″N 90°03′54″W
- Country: United States
- State: Louisiana
- City: New Orleans
- Planning District: District 1, French Quarter/CBD

Area
  - Total: 0.66 sq mi (1.7 km^{2})
  - Land: 0.49 sq mi (1.3 km^{2})
  - Water: 0.17 sq mi (0.44 km^{2})
- Elevation: 3 ft (0.91 m)

Population (2010)
  - Total: 3,888
  - Density: 7,900/sq mi (3,100/km^{2})
- Time zone: UTC-6 (CST)
  - Summer (DST): UTC-5 (CDT)
- ZIP Codes: 70116 – 70130
- Area code: 504
- Vieux Carre Historic District
- U.S. National Register of Historic Places
- U.S. National Historic Landmark District
- Location within Louisiana Location within the United States
- Built: 1734
- NRHP reference No.: 66000377

Significant dates
- Added to NRHP: October 15, 1966
- Designated NHLD: December 21, 1965

The French Quarter, also known as the Vieux Carré (UK: /ˌvjɜː kəˈreɪ/, US: /ˌvjʌ kəˈreɪ/, French: [vjø kaʁe]; lit. 'Old Square'), is the oldest neighborhood in the city of New Orleans. After New Orleans (French: Nouvelle-Orléans) was founded in 1718 by Jean-Baptiste Le Moyne de Bienville, the city developed around the Vieux Carré, a central square. The district is more commonly called the French Quarter today, or simply "The Quarter", related to changes in the city with American immigration after the 1803 Louisiana Purchase. Most of the extant historic buildings were constructed either in the late 18th century, during the city's period of Spanish rule, or were built during the first half of the 19th century, after U.S. purchase and statehood.

The district as a whole has been designated as a National Historic Landmark, with numerous contributing buildings that are separately deemed significant. It is a prime tourist destination in the city, as well as attracting local residents.

The French Quarter suffered relatively light damage from floodwater as compared to other areas of the city and the greater region, due to its distance from areas where the levee was breached during Hurricane Katrina in 2005 as well as the strength and height of the nearest Mississippi River Levees in contrast to other levees along the canals and lakefront.

== History ==
The French claimed Louisiana in the 1690s and Jean Baptiste Le Moyne de Bienville was appointed Director General in charge of developing a colony in the territory, and founded New Orleans in 1718. In 1721, the royal engineer Adrien de Pauger designed the city's street layout. He named the streets after French royal houses and Catholic saints, and paid homage to France's ruling family, the House of Bourbon, with the naming of Bourbon Street. New Orleans was ceded to the Spanish in 1763 following the Seven Years' War. The Great New Orleans Fire of 1788 and another in 1794 destroyed 80% of the city's buildings, and so nearly all the French Quarter dates from the late 1790s onward.

The Spanish introduced strict new fire codes that banned wooden siding in favor of fire-resistant brick, which was covered in stucco, painted in the pastel hues fashionable at the time. The old French peaked roofs were replaced with flat tiled ones, but the still largely French population continued to build in similar styles, influenced by colonial architecture of the Caribbean, such as timber balconies and galleries. (In southeast Louisiana, a distinction is made between "balconies", which are self-supporting and attached to the side of the building, and "galleries," which are supported from the ground by poles or columns.)

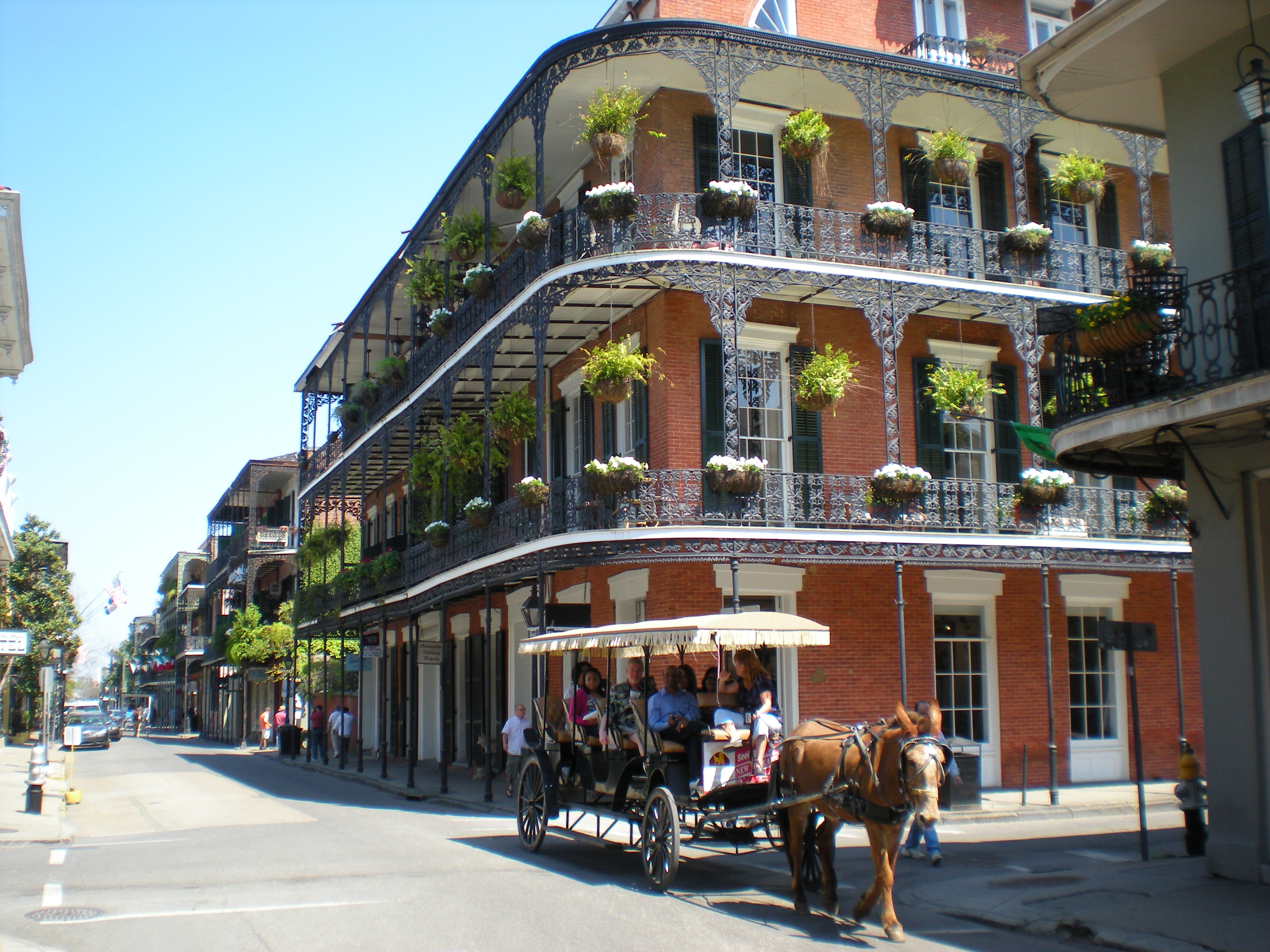
Elaborate ironwork galleries on the corner of Royal and Dumaine streets (featured are the Miltenberger Houses)

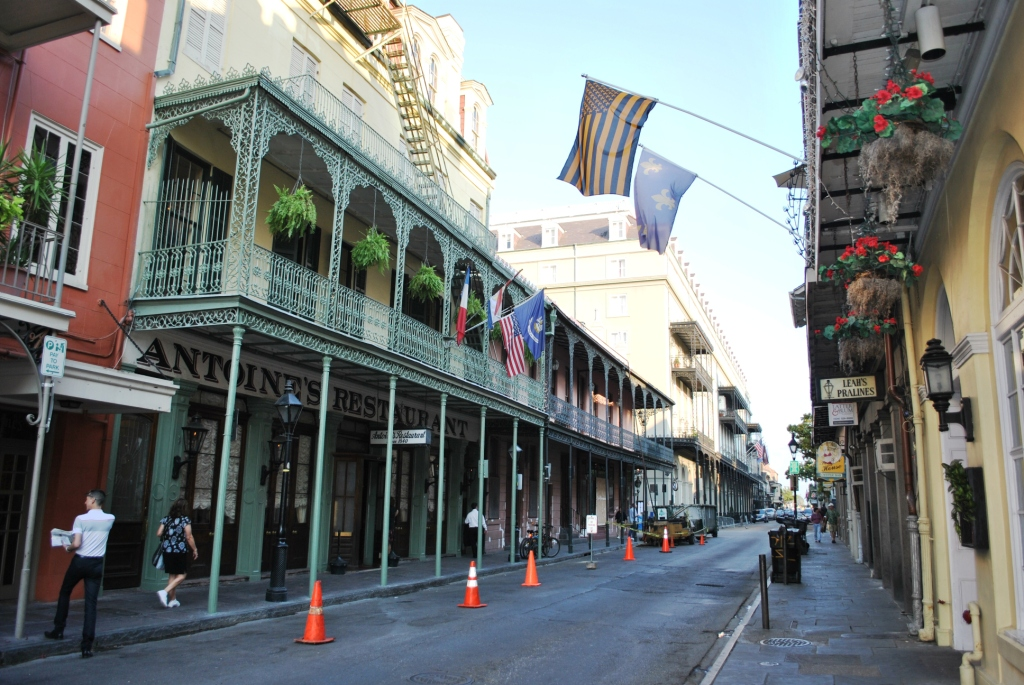
The 'galleries' introduced after 1851

When Anglophone Americans began to move in after the Louisiana Purchase in 1803, they mostly built on available land upriver, across modern-day Canal Street. This thoroughfare became the meeting place of two cultures, one Francophone Creole and the other Anglophone American. (Local landowners had retained architect and surveyor Barthelemy Lafon to subdivide their property to create an American suburb). The median of the wide boulevard became a place where the two contentious cultures could meet and do business in both French and English. As such, it became known as the "neutral ground", and this name is still used for medians in the New Orleans area.

During the 19th century, New Orleans was similar to other Southern cities in that its economy was based on selling cash crops, such as sugar, tobacco and cotton produced by enslaved labor. By 1840, newcomers whose wealth came from these enterprises turned New Orleans into the third largest metropolis in the country. The city's port was the nation's second largest, with New York City being the largest.

The development of New Orleans famous ornate cast iron 'galleries' began with the two storey examples on the Pontalba Buildings on Jackson Square, completed in 1851. As the most prominent and high class address at the time, they set a fashion for others to follow, and multi-level cast iron galleries soon replaced the old timber French ones on older buildings as well as gracing new ones.

Even before the Civil War, French Creoles had become a minority in the French Quarter. In the late 19th century the Quarter became a less fashionable part of town, and many immigrants from southern Italy and Ireland settled there. From 1884 to 1924 an estimated 290,000 Italian immigrants, a great deal of them from Sicily, arrived in New Orleans and settled in the French Quarter, which acquired the nickname "Little Palermo." In 1905, the Italian consul estimated that one-third to one-half of the Quarter's population were Italian-born or second generation Italian-Americans. Irish immigrants also settled heavily in the Esplanade area, which was called the "Irish Channel".

In 1917, the closure of Storyville sent much of the vice formerly concentrated therein back into the French Quarter, which "for most of the remaining French Creole families . . was the last straw, and they began to move uptown." This, combined with the loss of the French Opera House two years later, provided a bookend to the era of French Creole culture in the Quarter. Many of the remaining French Creoles moved to the university area.

In the early 20th century, the Quarter's cheap rents and air of decay attracted a bohemian artistic community, a trend which became pronounced in the 1920s. Many of these new inhabitants were active in the first preservation efforts in the Quarter, which began around that time. As a result, the Vieux Carré Commission (VCC) was established in 1925, spearheaded by Elizabeth Werlein. Although initially only an advisory body, a 1936 referendum to amend the Louisiana constitution afforded it a measure of regulatory power. It began to exercise more power in the 1940s to preserve and protect the district.

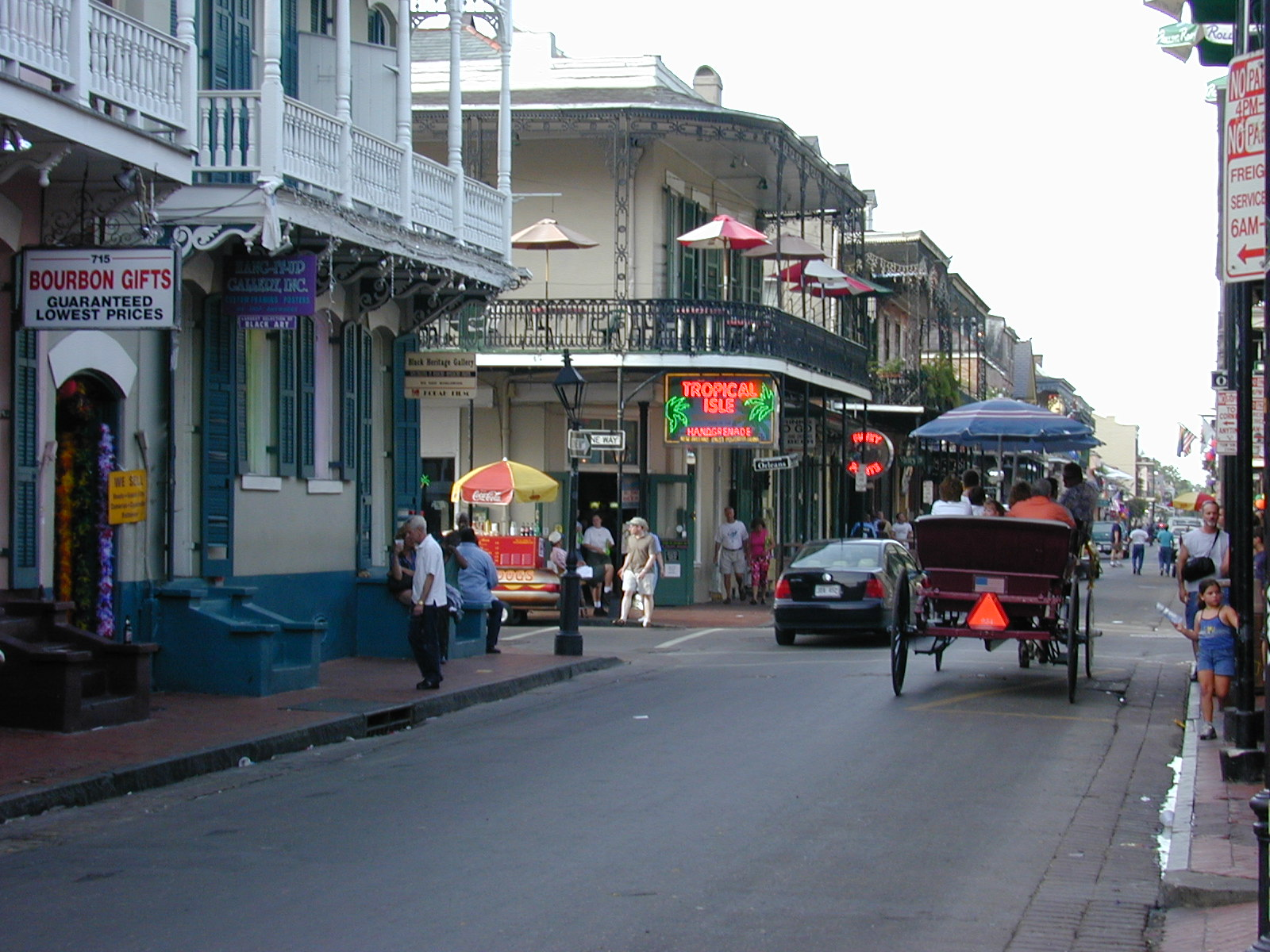
The Rue Bourbon, or Bourbon Street, was named for the former ruling dynasty of France, now the ruling dynasty of Spain.

Meanwhile, World War II brought thousands of servicemen and war workers to New Orleans as well as to the surrounding region's military bases and shipyards. Many of these sojourners paid visits to the Vieux Carré. Although nightlife and vice had already begun to coalesce on Bourbon Street in the two decades following the closure of Storyville, the war produced a larger, more permanent presence of exotic, risqué, and often raucous entertainment on what became the city's most famous strip. Years of repeated crackdowns on vice in Bourbon Street clubs, which took on new urgency under Mayor deLesseps Story Morrison, reached a crescendo with District Attorney Jim Garrison's raids in 1962, but Bourbon Street's clubs were soon back in business.

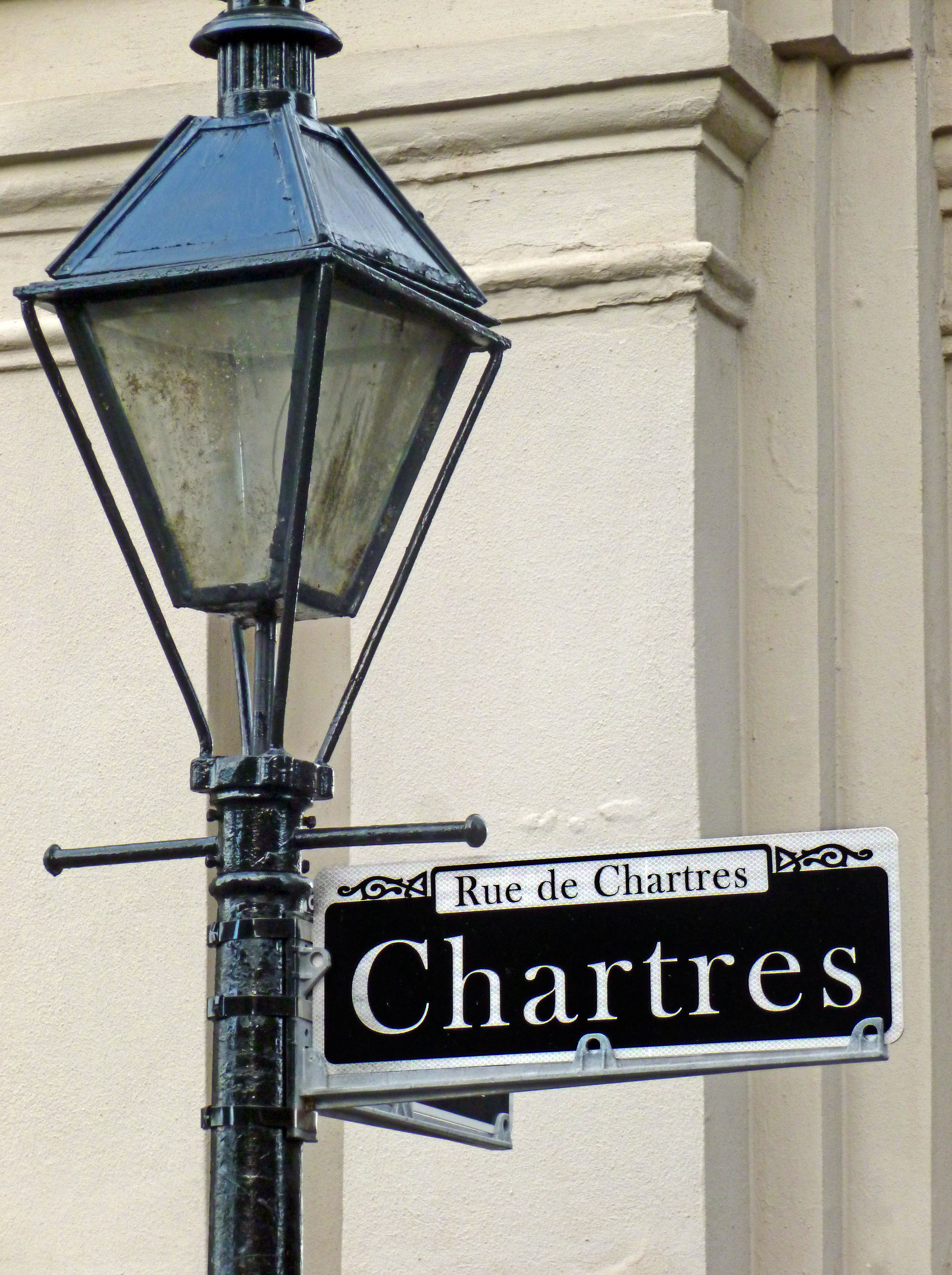
A streetlight and sign in the French Quarter section of New Orleans, LA

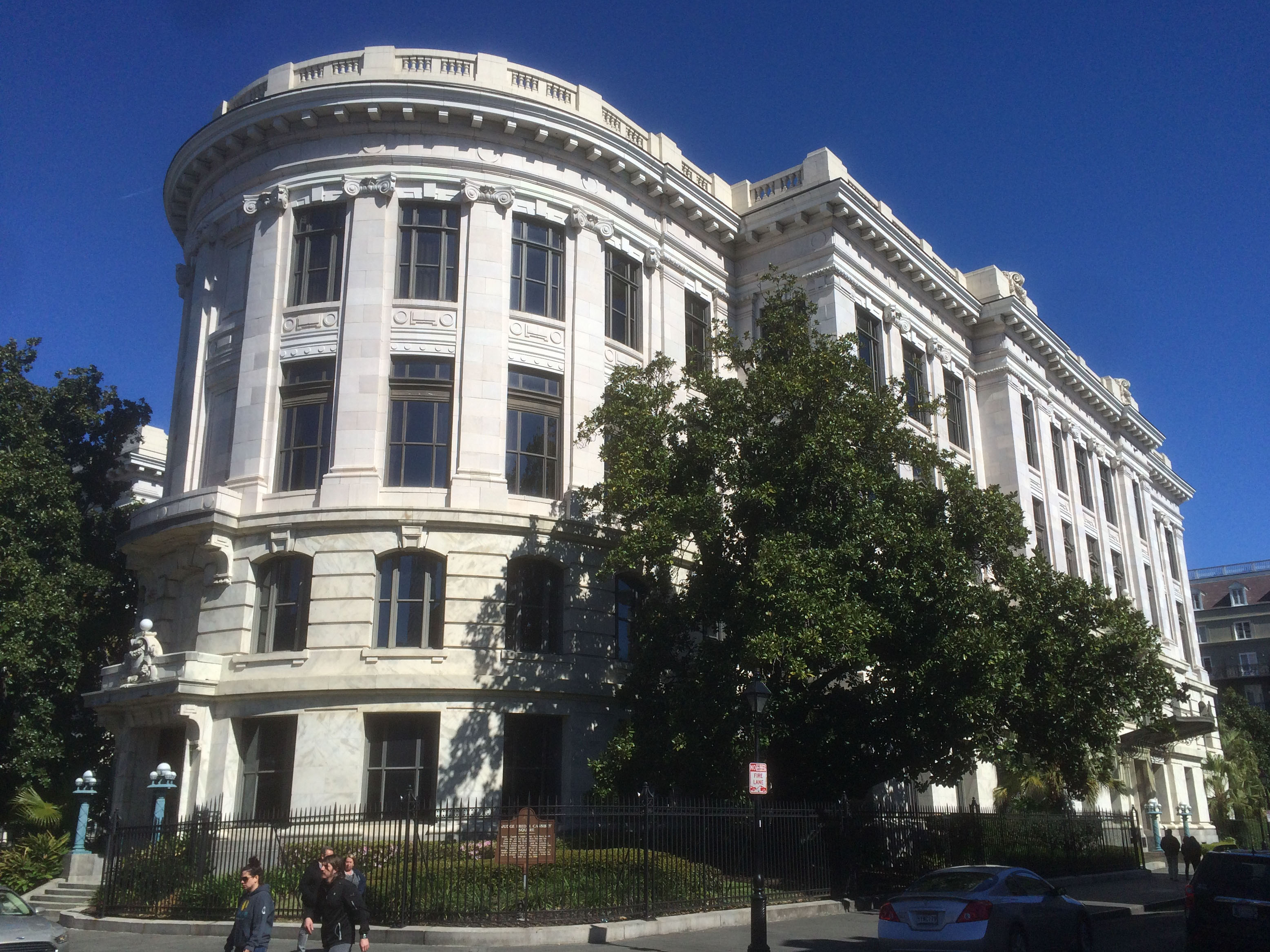
The Louisiana Supreme Court Building

The plan to construct an elevated Riverfront Expressway between the Mississippi River levee and the French Quarter consumed the attention of Vieux Carré preservationists through much of the 1960s. On December 21, 1965, the "Vieux Carre Historic District" was designated a National Historic Landmark. After waging a decade-long battle against the Vieux Carré Riverfront Expressway that utilized the newly passed National Historic Preservation Act of 1966, preservationists and their allies forced the issue into federal court, eventually producing the cancellation of the freeway plan in 1969.

The victory was important for the preservation of the French Quarter, but it was hardly the only challenge. Throughout the 1960s, new hotels opened regularly, often replacing large sections of the French Quarter. The VCC approved these structures as long as their designers adhered to prevailing exterior styles. Detractors, fearing that the Vieux Carré's charm might be compromised by the introduction of too many new inns, lobbied successfully for passage in 1969 of a municipal ordinance that forbade new hotels within the district's boundaries. However, the ordinance failed to stop the proliferation of timeshare condominiums and clandestine bed and breakfast inns throughout the French Quarter or high-rise hotels just outside its boundaries. In the 1980s, many long-term residents were driven away by rising rents, as property values rose dramatically with expectations of windfalls from the planned 1984 World's Fair site nearby.

More of the neighborhood was developed to support tourism, which is important to the city's economy. But, the French Quarter still combines residential, hotels, guest houses, bars, restaurants and tourist-oriented commercial properties.

=== Effect of Hurricane Katrina ===
As with other parts of the city developed before the late 19th century, and on higher land predating New Orleans' levee systems, the French Quarter remained substantially dry following Hurricane Katrina. Its elevation is five feet (1.5 m) above sea level. Some streets had minor flooding, and several buildings suffered significant wind damage. Most of the major landmarks suffered only minor damage. In addition, the Quarter largely escaped the looting and violence that occurred after the storm; nearly all of the antique shops and art galleries in the French Quarter, for example, were untouched.

Mayor Ray Nagin officially reopened the French Quarter on September 26, 2005 (almost a month after the storm), for business owners to inspect their property and clean up. Within a few weeks, a large selection of French Quarter businesses had reopened. The Historic New Orleans Collection's Williams Research Center Annex was the first new construction completed in the French Quarter after Hurricane Katrina.

=== Post-Katrina ===
In 2020, Mayor of New Orleans LaToya Cantrell proposed ending use of automobiles in the French Quarter.

=== 2025 truck attack ===
Early on the morning of January 1, 2025, a man later identified by the Federal Bureau of Investigation as Shamsud-Din Bahar Jabbar rammed a pick-up truck into a crowd on Bourbon Street, killing 14 and injuring at least 36, including two police officers who were shot. Jabbar was shot and killed by police after crashing into a crane and leaving the vehicle armed with two firearms. The crime, which the FBI investigated as an act of terrorism, occurred during New Year's celebrations and a day before the city hosted the Sugar Bowl. The FBI stated that they believe Jabbar worked alone. Security footage showed Jabbar planting an explosive device in the French Quarter. Pipe bombs were found in coolers on Bourbon Street.

== Geography ==
The French Quarter is located at 29°57′31″N 90°03′54″W and has an elevation of 1 foot (0.3 m). According to the United States Census Bureau, the district has a total area of 0.66 square miles (1.7 km^{2}). 0.49 square miles (1.3 km^{2}) of which is land and 0.17 square miles (0.4 km^{2}) (25.76%) of which is water.

=== Boundaries ===
The most common definition of the French Quarter includes all the land stretching along the Mississippi River from Canal Street to Esplanade Avenue (13 blocks) and inland to North Rampart Street (seven to nine blocks). It equals an area of 78 square blocks. Some definitions, such as city zoning laws, exclude the properties facing Canal Street, which had already been redeveloped by the time architectural preservation was considered, and the section between Decatur Street and the river, much of which had long served industrial and warehousing functions.

Any alteration to structures in the remaining blocks is subject to review by the Vieux Carré Commission, which determines whether the proposal is appropriate for the historic character of the district. Its boundaries as defined by the City Planning Commission are: Esplanade Avenue to the north, the Mississippi River to the east, Canal Street, Decatur Street and Iberville Street to the south and the Basin Street, St. Louis Street and North Rampart Street to the west.

The National Historic Landmark district is stated to be 85 square blocks. The Quarter is subdistrict of the French Quarter/CBD Area.

=== Adjacent neighborhoods ===
- Faubourg Marigny (east)
- Central Business District (west)
- Iberville (north)
- Tremé (north)

== Demographics ==
As of the census of 2000, there were 4,176 people, 2,908 households, and 509 families residing in the neighborhood. The population density was 8,523 /mi^{2} (3,212 /km^{2}). As of the census of 2010, there were 3,813 people, 2,635 households, and 549 families residing in the neighborhood.

== Landmarks and attractions ==
=== Jackson Square ===
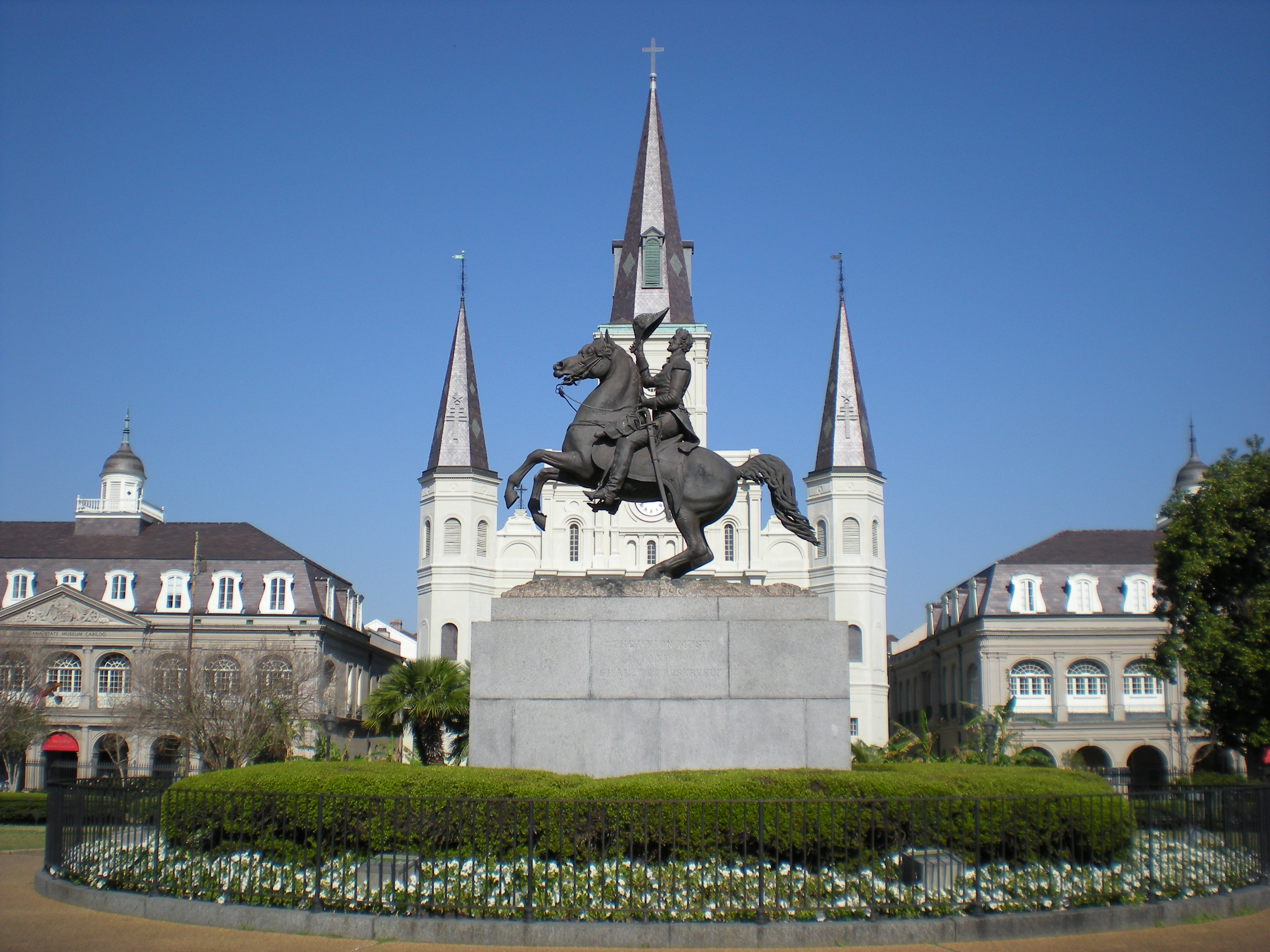
Jackson equestrian statue and St. Louis Cathedral – flanked by the Cabildo and the Presbytere

Jackson Square (formerly Place d'Armes or Plaza de Armas, in French and Spanish, respectively), originally designed by architect and landscaper Louis H. Pilié (officially credited only with the iron fence), is a public, gated park the size of a city block, located at the front of the French Quarter (GPS 29.95748°N 90.06310°W). In the mid-19th century, the square was named after President (formerly General, of Battle of New Orleans acclaim) Andrew Jackson.

In 1856, city leaders purchased an equestrian statue of Jackson from the sculptor Clark Mills. The statue was placed at the center of the square, which was converted to a park from its previous use as a military parade ground and execution site. Convicted criminals were sometimes hanged in the square. After the slave insurrection of 1811 during the U.S. territorial period, some of the insurgents were sentenced to death in Orleans Parish, and their severed heads were displayed there.

The square originally overlooked the Mississippi River across Decatur Street; however, the view was blocked in the 19th century when larger levees were built along the river. The riverfront was long devoted to shipping-related activities at the heart of the port. The administration of Mayor Moon Landrieu put in a scenic boardwalk across from Jackson Square; it is known as the "Moon Walk" in his honor. At the end of the 1980s, old wharves and warehouses were demolished to create Woldenberg Park, extending the riverfront promenade up to Canal Street.

On the opposite side of the square from the River are three 18th‑century historic buildings, which were the city's heart in the colonial era. The center of the three is St. Louis Cathedral. The cathedral was designated a minor basilica by Pope Paul VI. To its left is the Cabildo, the old city hall, now a museum, where the final transfer papers for the Louisiana Purchase were signed. To the cathedral's right is the Presbytère, built to match the Cabildo. The Presbytère, originally planned to house the city's Roman Catholic priests and authorities, was adapted as a courthouse at the start of the 19th century after the Louisiana Purchase, when civilian government was elevated over church authority. In the 20th century it was adapted as a museum.

On each side of the square are the Pontalba Buildings, matching red-brick, one-block-long, four‑story buildings constructed between 1849 and 1851. The ground floors house shops and restaurants; the upper floors are apartments. The buildings were planned as row townhouses; they were not converted to rental apartments until the 1930s (during the Great Depression). The buildings were designed and constructed by Baroness Micaela Almonester Pontalba, daughter of Don Andres Almonaster y Rojas, a prominent Spanish philanthropist in Creole New Orleans. Micaela Almonaster was born in Louisiana in 1795. Her father died three years later, and she became sole heiress to his fortune and his New Orleans land holdings.

Directly across from Jackson Square is the Jax Brewery building, the original home of a local beer. After the company ceased to operate independently, the building was converted for use by retail businesses, including restaurants and specialty shops. In recent years, some retail space has been converted into riverfront condominiums. Behind the Jax Brewery lies the Toulouse Street Wharf, the regular pier for the excursion steamboat, Natchez.

From the 1920s through the 1980s, Jackson Square became known for attracting painters, young art students, and caricaturists. In the 1990s, the artists were joined by tarot card readers, mimes, fortune tellers, and other street performers.

Live music has been a regular feature of the entire Quarter, including the Square, for more than a century. Formal concerts are also held, although more rarely. Street musicians play for tips.

Diagonally across the square from the Cabildo is Café du Monde, open 24 hours a day except for Christmas Day. The historic open-air cafe is known for its café au lait, its coffee blended with chicory, and its beignets, made and served there continuously since the Civil War period (1862). It is a custom for anyone visiting for the first time to blow the powdered sugar off a beignet and make a wish.

=== Bourbon Street ===
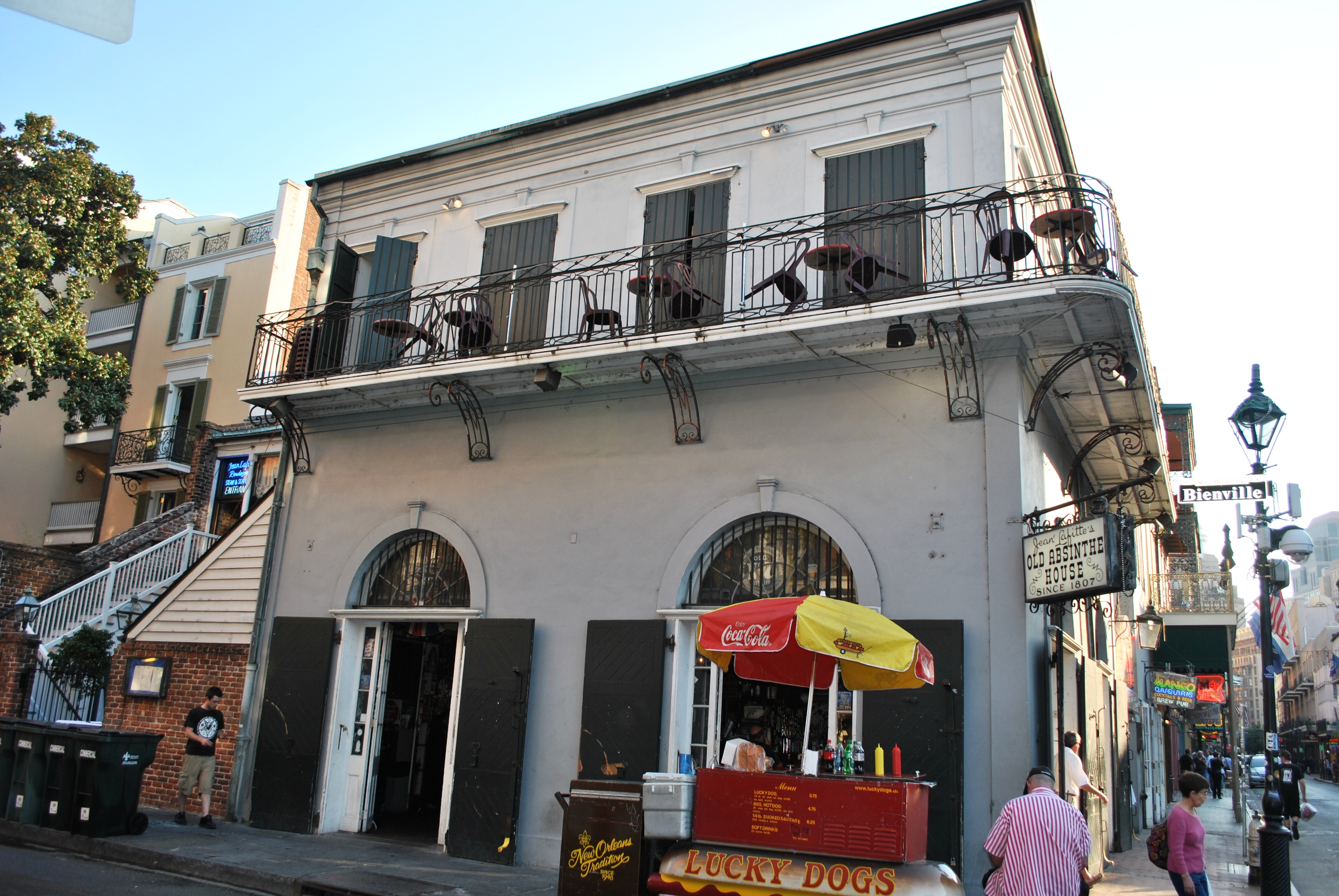
The Old Absinthe House

The most well-known of the French Quarter streets, Bourbon Street, or Rue Bourbon, is known for its drinking establishments. Most of the bars frequented by tourists are new but the Quarter also has a number of notable bars with interesting histories. The Old Absinthe House has kept its name even though absinthe was banned in the U.S. from 1915 to 2007 because it was believed to have toxic qualities.

Pat O'Brien's Bar is known both for inventing the red Hurricane cocktail and for having the first dueling piano bar. Pat O'Brien's is located at 718 St. Peter Street.

Lafitte's Blacksmith Shop is a tavern located on the corner of Bourbon and St. Philip streets. Built sometime before 1772, it is one of the older surviving structures in New Orleans. It is also the oldest bar in all of America that still operates as a bar. According to legend, the structure was once a business owned by the Lafitte brothers, perhaps as a "front" for their smuggling operations at Barataria Bay.

The Napoleon House bar and restaurant is in the former home of mayor Nicholas Girod. It was named for an unrealized plot to rescue Napoleon from his exile in Saint Helena and bring him to New Orleans.

The original Johnny White's bar is a favorite of motorcycle bikers. In 2005 an offshoot called Johnny White's Hole in the Wall, along with Molly's at the Market, drew national media attention as the only businesses in the city to stay open throughout Hurricane Katrina and the weeks after the storm.

Spirits on Bourbon was featured on the season three of Bar Rescue. It has become a staple of Bourbon Street, with its light-up skull cup and Resurrection drink.

The Bourbon Pub and Oz, both located at the intersection of Bourbon and St. Ann Streets, are the two largest gay clubs in New Orleans. Café Lafitte in Exile, located at the intersection of Bourbon and Dumaine, is the oldest continuously running gay bar in the United States. These and other gay establishments sponsor the raucous Southern Decadence Festival during Labor Day weekend. This festival is often referred to as New Orleans' Gay Mardi Gras. St. Ann Street is often called "the Lavender Line" or "the Velvet Line" in reference to its being on the edge of the French Quarter's predominately gay district. While gay residents live throughout the French Quarter, that portion northeast of St. Ann Street is generally considered to be the gay district.

New Orleans and its French Quarter are one of a few places in the United States where possession and consumption of alcohol in open containers is allowed on the street. French Quarter Street is also home to jazz music; there are many street performers and jazz shops. Many streets are filled with jazz clubs with live jazz performances, making it an attractive destination in the neighborhood.

=== Museums ===
The French Quarter boasts several museums, including the New Orleans Historic Voodoo Museum, New Orleans Pharmacy Museum, New Orleans Jazz Museum, The Historic New Orleans Collection and the Museum of Death.

=== Restaurants ===
The neighborhood contains many restaurants, ranging from formal to casual, patronized by both visitors and locals. Some are well-known landmarks, such as Antoine's and Tujague's, which have been in business since the 19th century. Arnaud's, Galatoire's, Broussard's, and Brennan's are also venerable.

Less historic—but also well-known—French Quarter restaurants include those run by chefs Paul Prudhomme ("K-Paul's"), Emeril Lagasse ("NOLA"), and John Besh. Port of Call on Esplanade Avenue has been in business for more than 30 years, and is recognized for its popular "Monsoon" drink (their answer to the "Hurricane" at Pat O'Brien's Bar) as well as for its food.

The Gumbo Shop is another traditional eatery in the Quarter and where casual dress is acceptable. For a take-out lunch, Central Grocery on Decatur Street is the home of the original muffaletta Italian sandwich, with New Orleans being a major center for Italian cuisine in the American South.

=== Hotels ===
Accommodations in the French Quarter range from large international chain hotels, to bed and breakfasts, to time-share condominiums and small guest houses with only one or two rooms. The French Quarter is known for its traditional-style hotels, such as the Bourbon Orleans, Hotel Monteleone (family-owned), Royal Sonesta, the Astor, and the Omni Royal Orleans. The Hotel St. Pierre is a small hotel also consisting of historic French Quarter houses, with a courtyard patio.

The Audubon Cottages are a collection of seven Creole cottages, two of which were utilized by John James Audubon in the early 19th century when he worked in New Orleans for a short time. Also utilized by Audubon was the current breakfast room of the Dauphine Orleans Hotel, a 111-room hotel located on Dauphine Street. The Dauphine Orleans Hotel's on-site bar, May Baily's Place, was once one of New Orleans' most-known brothels, and it is rumored that the ghosts of prostitutes and American Civil War soldiers haunt the property.

== Education ==
Orleans Parish School Board (OPSB) manages the public school system.

The Roman Catholic Archdiocese of New Orleans operates area Catholic schools. Cathedral Academy, originally St. Louis Cathedral School, was in the French Quarter. It opened in 1914, and had a building separate from that of its parish. In 2012 the archdiocese decided to close the school. It had 156 students in 2012, and the archdiocese's criterion for optimal enrollment in a K–7 was 200. St. Stephen School in Uptown New Orleans offered places to St. Louis Cathedral students. Cathedral Academy parents stated opposition against the closure.

== See also ==
- Buildings and architecture of New Orleans
- French Market
- French Quarter Festival, early April
- Jackson Square
- Louisiana Creole cuisine
- Satchmo SummerFest, early August
- List of National Historic Landmarks in Louisiana
- National Register of Historic Places listings in Orleans Parish, Louisiana
