= Meadow Gold Dairies =

Meadow Gold Dairies may refer to:

- Meadow Gold Dairies (Hawaii), a historic dairy business in Hawaii
- A division of Dean Foods
