= POG (drink) =

Tropical juice drink

POG, or Passion Orange Guava, is a tropical juice drink created in 1971 by a food product consultant named Mary Soon, who worked for Haleakala Dairy on Maui, Hawaii. The name POG is an acronym for three fruits from which it is made: passionfruit, orange, and guava.

POG is produced by Meadow Gold Dairy, a subsidiary of Dean Foods. Similar blends of passionfruit, orange and guava juices are also produced by other companies.

== Association with Pogs game ==
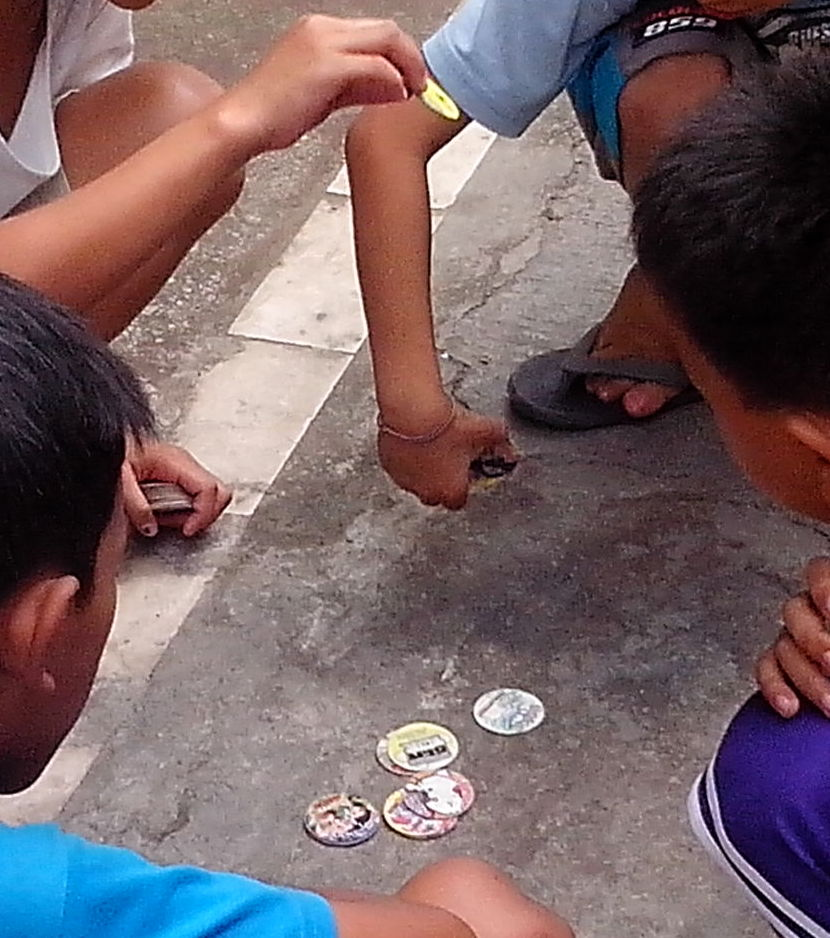
Children playing Pogs

The caps used to seal milk bottles inspired the fad game Pogs (or "milk caps"), which became popular during the early- to mid-1990s. The game of pogs possibly originated in Maui, Hawaii, in the 1920s or 1930s.

Although POG juice was never sold in bottles with cardboard milk caps, the two became associated after Haleakala Dairy gave away caps printed with the POG logo as a marketing promotion in the 1970s. The 1990s craze using these milk caps was initiated by Blossom Galbiso, a teacher in Hawaii in 1991. She started using the _(fruit)milk caps in her classroom and told her students about an old game she used to play: flipping milk caps to be the first one to get the cream off the bottom of the cap. Her students began flipping the milk caps and the resurgence of the game called Pogs began.

== Mascot ==
The POG drink features its mascot on the juice carton cover, known as a "Poglodyte". Poglodytes are fuzzy yellow creatures who were often depicted with surfboards. The side of the juice carton describes them as the creatures from the magical village that makes POG juice.

== See also ==
- List of juices
- Fassionola
