= Pat O'Brien's Bar =

Bar in New Orleans, Louisiana, United States

Coordinates: 29.9581°N 90.0655°W

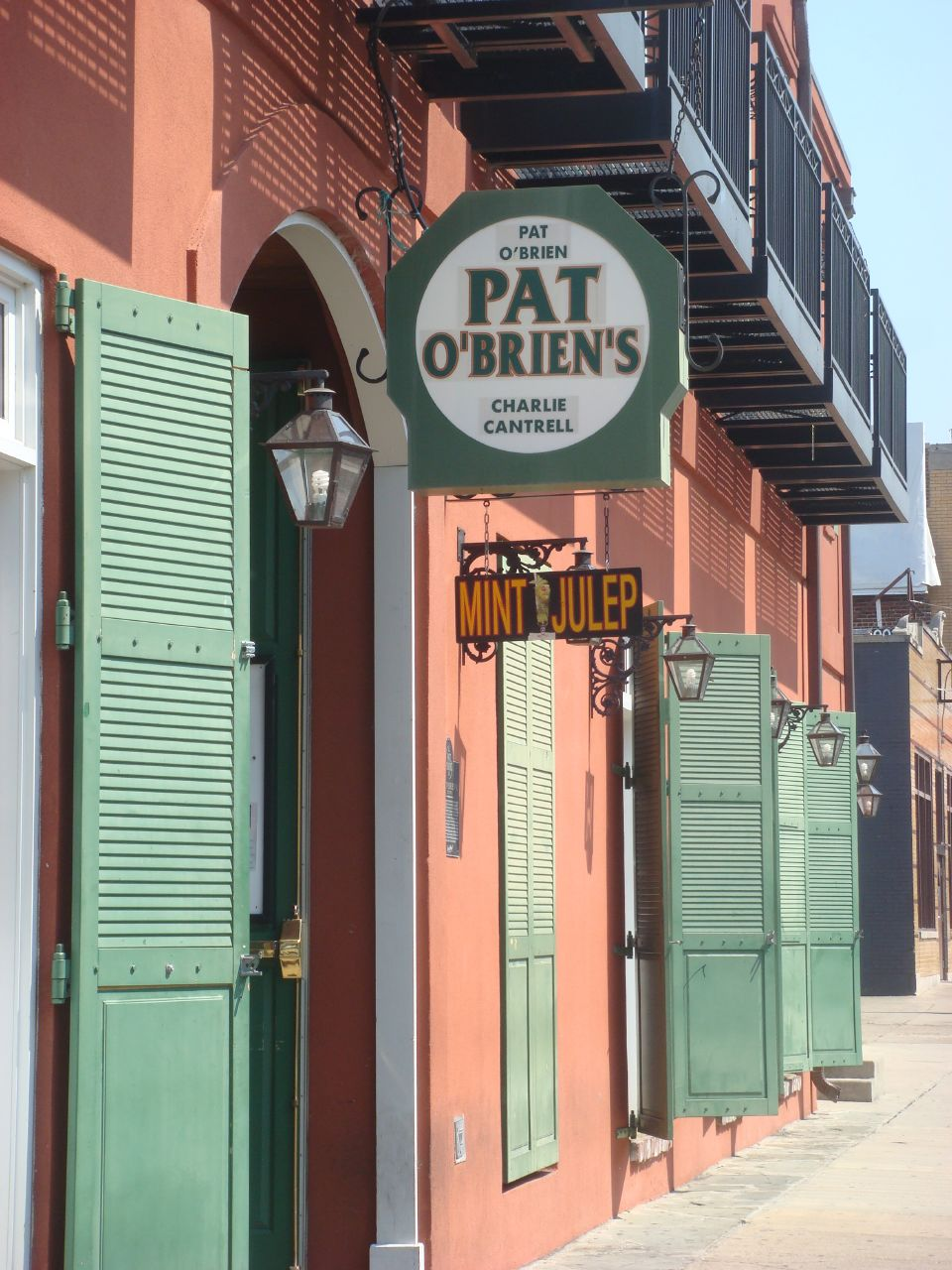
Entrance to Pat O'Brien's on St. Peter Street

Pat O'Brien's Bar is a bar located in New Orleans, Louisiana that began operation as a legal liquor establishment on December 3, 1933, at the intersection of Royal and St. Peter streets in the French Quarter. Before that, during Prohibition the bar was known as Mr. O'Brien's Club Tipperary; the password "storm's brewin'" was required to gain entrance to the establishment. In December 1942 it moved to its present location at 718 St. Peter Street, into a historic building dating from 1791. Pat O'Brien's is home to the original flaming fountain (located in the courtyard) and the hurricane cocktail. There is also a piano bar, featuring twin "dueling" pianos where local entertainers take song requests. The dueling piano bar is thought to be the first of its kind.

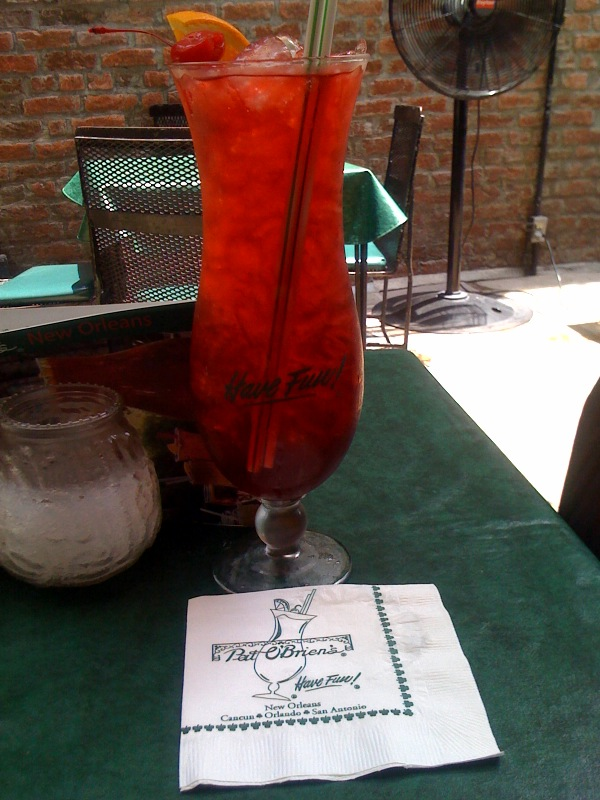
Pat O'Brien's signature hurricane

O'Brien is reported to have invented the hurricane cocktail in the 1940s. The story of the drink's origin holds that, due to difficulties importing scotch during World War II, liquor salesmen forced bar owners to buy up to 50 cases of their much-more-plentiful rum in order to secure a single case of good whiskey or scotch. The barmen at Pat O'Brien's came up with an appealing recipe to reduce their bulging surplus of rum. When they decided to serve it in a hurricane glass, shaped like a hurricane lamp, the hurricane was born.

The Oechsner family took over in 1978, with general manager George Oechsner, Jr. and his son Sonny becoming proprietors. As of 2018, the bar was run by third-generation family member Shelly Oechsner Waguespack.

Other locations of Pat O'Brien's Bar:

- Orlando, Florida at Universal Orlando's CityWalk
- San Antonio, Texas

== TV and film appearances ==
- Trailer Park Boys Out of the Park USA S1E4 "New Orleans" they only stand outside the bar though, not actually going inside.
- The bar was featured in a New Orleans edition of the TruTV series Impractical Jokers.
- The bar's front sign was briefly visible in a New Orleans reference in season 5, episode 13 of Family Guy, "Bill and Peter's Bogus Journey."
- NCIS: New Orleans, season 3, episode 5--Pride and Gregorio interview the daughter of a victim who waits tables at the bar.
