= Fassionola =

Fruit syrup

Fassionola is a typically fruit-flavored (passion fruit and others), red-colored syrup that was frequently used in tropical drinks during the 1930s but is now a relatively unusual ingredient. It also comes in green and gold varieties that are sometimes made to taste differently. It is used as a fruit punch concentrate, and some claim that a red-colored fruit syrup called fassionola was an ingredient in the original Hurricane cocktail. Although a frequent attribution, solid evidence of fassionola's use in the Hurricane from before 1956 is lacking, and it is not known what the precise ingredients were in the earliest version of fassionola.

== Tiki drink usage ==
Claimed to have been first fashioned in 1916, the complete history of fassionola is unclear but is closely associated with Donn Beach (AKA Don the Beachcomber). Beach cites his childhood as growing up near New Orleans, and he sometimes used fassionola in making what came to be known as "tiki drinks" in his 1930s-era bars. Some claim fassionola was invented by Beach; others believe that is unclear. Regardless, the ingredient is listed as being used by Beach in the book Hawai'i, Rum Drinks & Cuisine by Don the Beachcomber and calls for its use in some of Beach's more well-known drinks such as the Cobra's Fang, Pi Yi, and Rum Barrel. The book also discusses the extent that Beach went to in order to keep his recipes a secret, premixing ingredients himself and relabeling bottles with only numbers and letters, with recipes sometimes written in code.

Trader Vic listed what he called "passionola" in the index of his 1972 revised Bartender's Guide. He described it as "a non-alcoholic syrup made from passion fruit [that] comes in three colors — red, green, and natural". He did not, however, list it as an ingredient for any of the cocktails in his book.

21st-century drink makers continue to use the ingredient in tiki cocktail recipes, where it is viewed by some as a "secret ingredient" and by others as a generic fruit punch concentrate.

== Commercial brands ==
A common and the attributed original mass manufactured brand is Jonathan English's Brand Red Tropical Gold Fruit Mix, produced and distributed by the Jonathan English Company in San Diego since the 1950s.

== See also ==
- Falernum
- Orgeat syrup
- Passion fruit-Orange-Guava juice (POG)
