= New Orleans Pharmacy Museum =

Pharmacy museum in New Orleans, Louisiana

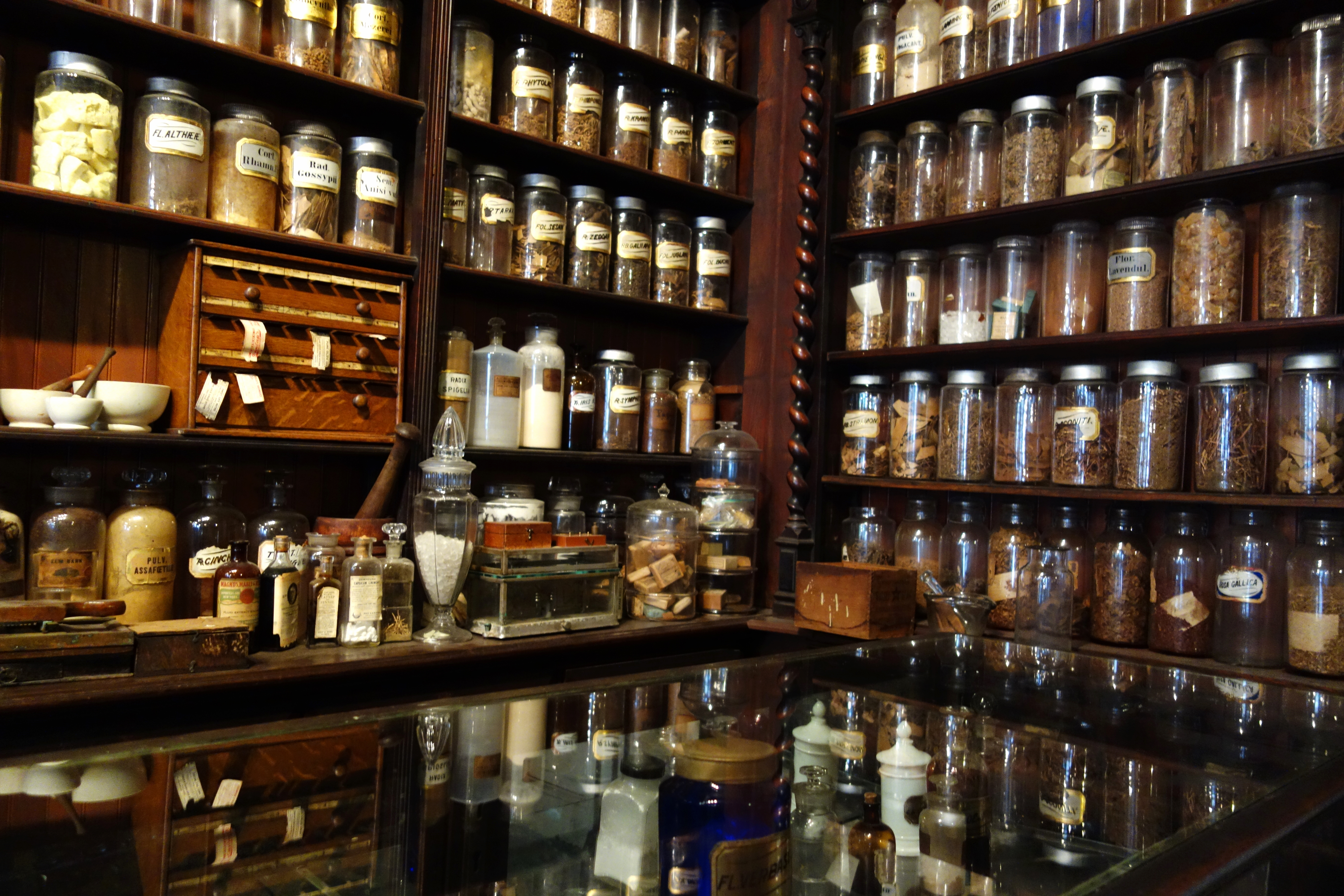
- Interior view, 2015
- Interactive fullscreen map
- Established: 1950
- Location: 514 Chartres Street, New Orleans, Louisiana, US 70130
- Coordinates: 29.9560°N 90.0649°W
- Director: Elizabeth Sherman
- Website: pharmacymuseum.org

The New Orleans Pharmacy Museum is a museum located in the French Quarter of New Orleans that showcases the world of early pharmacies and medicine and describes development of the pharmaceutical industry and healthcare practices in the 19th century. It is the largest collection of pharmaceutical memorabilia in the United States. The building is the former residence and apothecary of America's first licensed pharmacist, Louis J. Dufilho, Jr. Dufilho was licensed in pharmacy in 1816. This was in the setting when public health was lacking in New Orleans. The building was designed by J. N. B DePouilly.

The building itself is an example of the French Quarter architecture, a classic two-level creole townhouse. It was constructed in 1822-1823. Dulfilho resided in the building until 1855. After the sale of the building, Dr. James Dupas took up residence in the building until he died at age 60 of "acute diarrhea." After his passing, the building was sold by his widow to Peter Boehm, whereupon he opened the Crescent City Paper Warehouse. In the years since then, rumors have begun to spread that Dr. Dupas engaged in unethical experimentation on enslaved individuals—this is an often repeated story in local ghost tours and local ghost books. However, there is little to no proof of this having occurred and many of the details do not fit with feasible facts, such as the statement that Dr. Dupas "murdered hundreds". The story that is often told bears remarkable similarities to the unethical experiments performed by J. Marion Sims during the 19th century, whose actions were widely published (by Sims himself). This is not to say that Dr. Dupas did not interact with enslaved individuals—records of sale indicate he enslaved two individuals, an unnamed male and unnamed female.

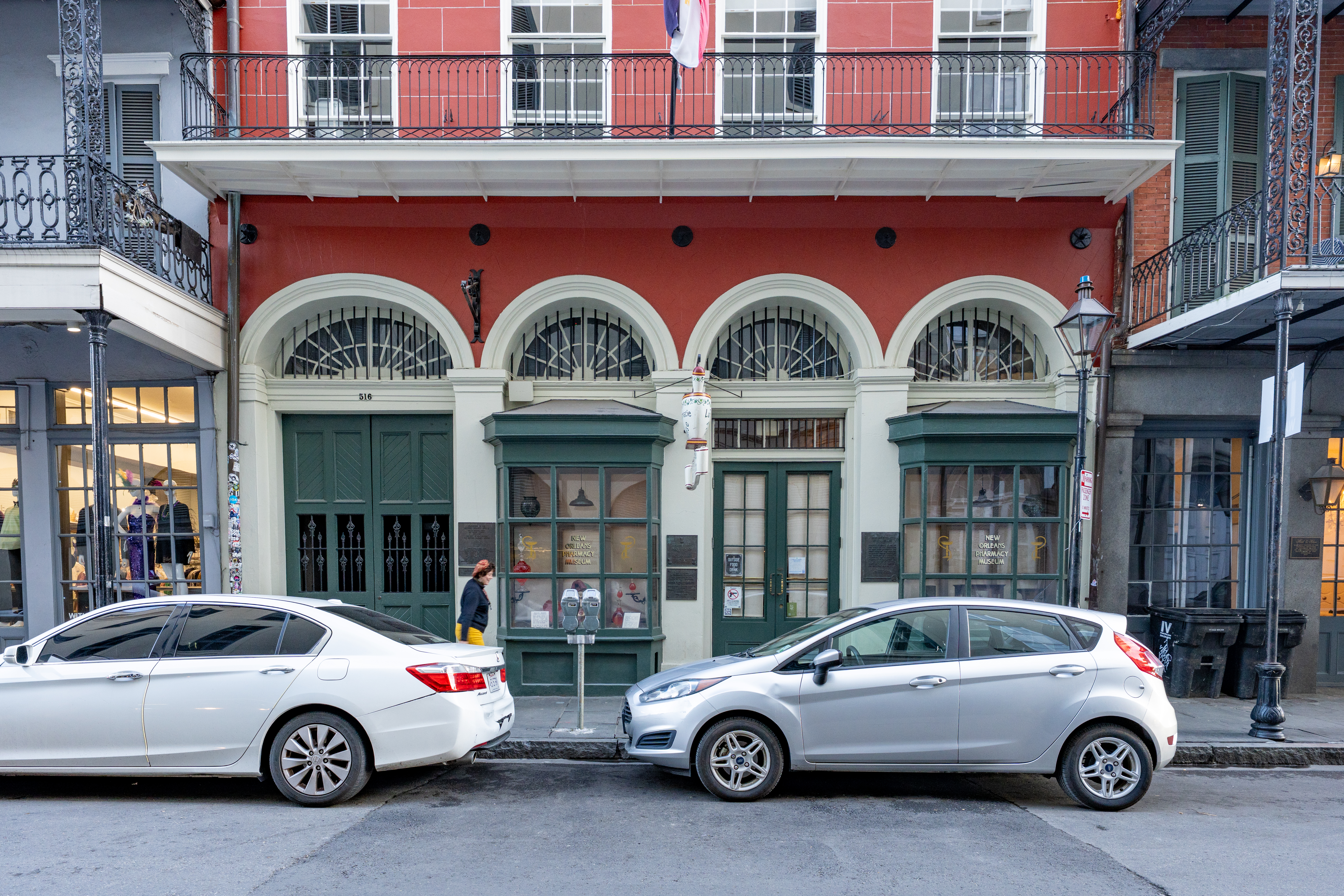
Exterior (2026)

The museum contains displays and exhibits that showcase the history of pharmacy, including glass bottles, medicines, medical instruments, voodoo potions, and herbs. There is a courtyard that grows plants including herbs similar to when Difulho used to grow for use as medicines and other products. Visitors can explore the museum on their own or choose to go on the once-a-day tour.

The museum was founded in 1950.
