= Hurricane glass =

Form of drinking glass

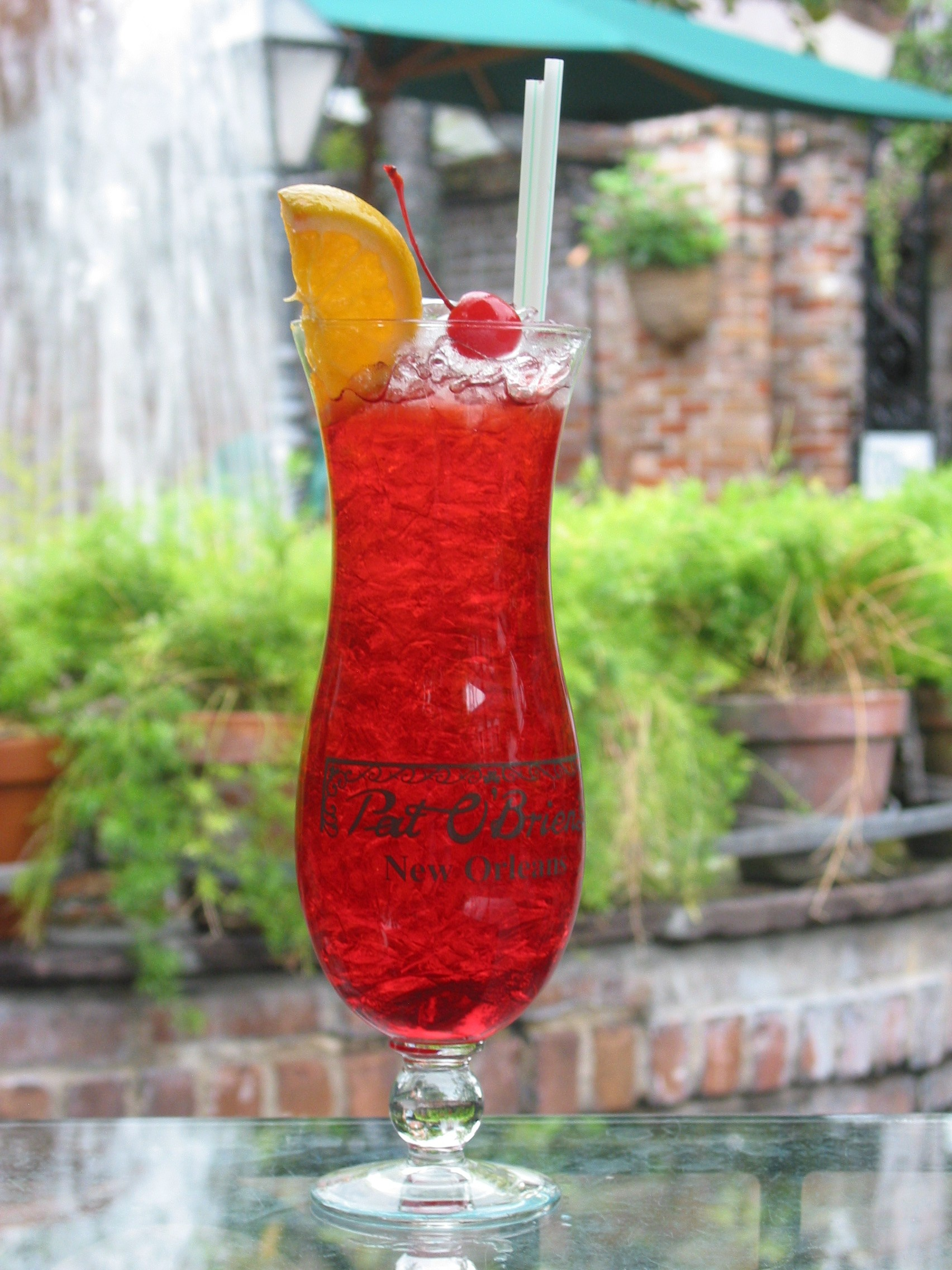
Hurricane cocktail in a Souvenir Hurricane Glass at Pat O'Brien's Bar in New Orleans

In American English, a hurricane glass is a form of drinking glass which typically will contain 20 US fluid ounces (590 ml; 21 imp fl oz). It is used to serve mixed drinks, particularly the hurricane cocktail from which it is named, originating at Pat O'Brien's Bar in New Orleans. Other drinks served in this glass include the Singapore Sling, June bug, piña colada and Blue Hawaii. It is shaped similarly to a vase or a hurricane lamp and is typically taller and wider than a highball glass.

The shape is effectively the same as the German Pilstulpe ("Pilsner Tulip") or Biertulpe ("Beer tulip") traditionally used for some German Pilsner beers, as well as some Belgian beers.

In New Orleans, a Hurricane is sometimes served in a disposable plastic cup, as New Orleans laws permit drinking in public and leaving a bar with a drink, but prohibit public drinking from glass or metal containers.

The poco grande glass has a similar fluted bowl shape, but is shallower and has a longer stem. It is used for similar drinks as the hurricane glass, but its smaller portion size (about 12 US fluid ounces or 350 ml) allows the bartender flexibility in determining the size of the drinks offered and/or the amount of alcohol in the glass.

== See also ==
- Old Fashioned glass
