= Cobra's fang =

Tiki cocktail

- Ingredients: 1 1/2 oz Demerera 151 rum; 1/2 oz Jamaican dark rum; 1/4 oz Fassionola syrup; 1/2 oz Falernum syrup; 1/2 oz Orange juice; 1/2 oz Lime Juice; Dash each bitters & grenadine
- Standard drinkware: Zombie glass
- Standard garnish: Fresh mint and lime wheel
- Served: blended with crushed ice

The cobra's fang is a vintage tiki cocktail invented by Donn Beach that calls for a mixture of rums along with fassionola and falernum syrups, the juice of orange and limes, and a dash each of bitters and grenadine. The recipe from the book Hawai'i: Tropical Rum Drinks & Cuisine By Don the Beachcomber calls for it being garnished with fresh mint and a lime wheel, although a length of spiral cut lime peel made to look like a snake is used for aesthetics in some cobra named cocktails.

== History ==
The cobra's fang was one of many drinks with theatrical names placed onto "The Beachcomber"'s menus, going along with the likes of the Shark's Tooth and Nelson's Blood and meant to evoke a sense of faux-danger as part of the exotic tropical mood he set for his bars. As shown on a 1941 Don the Beachcomber drink menu, the cobra's fang cost $1 and was served in a tall curved glass.

Some feel the use of fassionola syrup was particularly important to the drink, which Beach may have brought along with him from his youth in New Orleans. Some claim fassionola was invented by Beach. Others believe that is unclear.

== Variations ==
Jeff Berry has a version from circa 1937 that he also attributes to Donn Beach that calls for 1 1/2 oz 151 proof Demerara rum, 1/2 oz passion fruit syrup, 1/2 oz orange and lime juices, 1/2 oz of falernum, 1 dash of bitters and 6 drops of absinthe. The Tiki Ti has their own version as well.

The sidewinder's fang was the Lanai restaurant's version of a cobra's fang cooler and called for 1 oz of Demerara rum, 1 oz dark Jamaican rum, 1 1/2 oz of passion fruit syrup, and 1 1/2 oz each of orange and lime juice along with 3 oz of club soda.

== Eponymous mug ==
As served in the early days of the Beachcomber restaurants, the cobra's fang was presented in a tall curved glass. Because some later drink menus from other restaurants showed the cobra's fang in a special snake shaped Tiki mug, there is debate over whether such a historical mug truly existed. Regardless, modern manufacturing of a replica for such a mug has taken place.
