= Dueling pianos =

Genre of piano performance

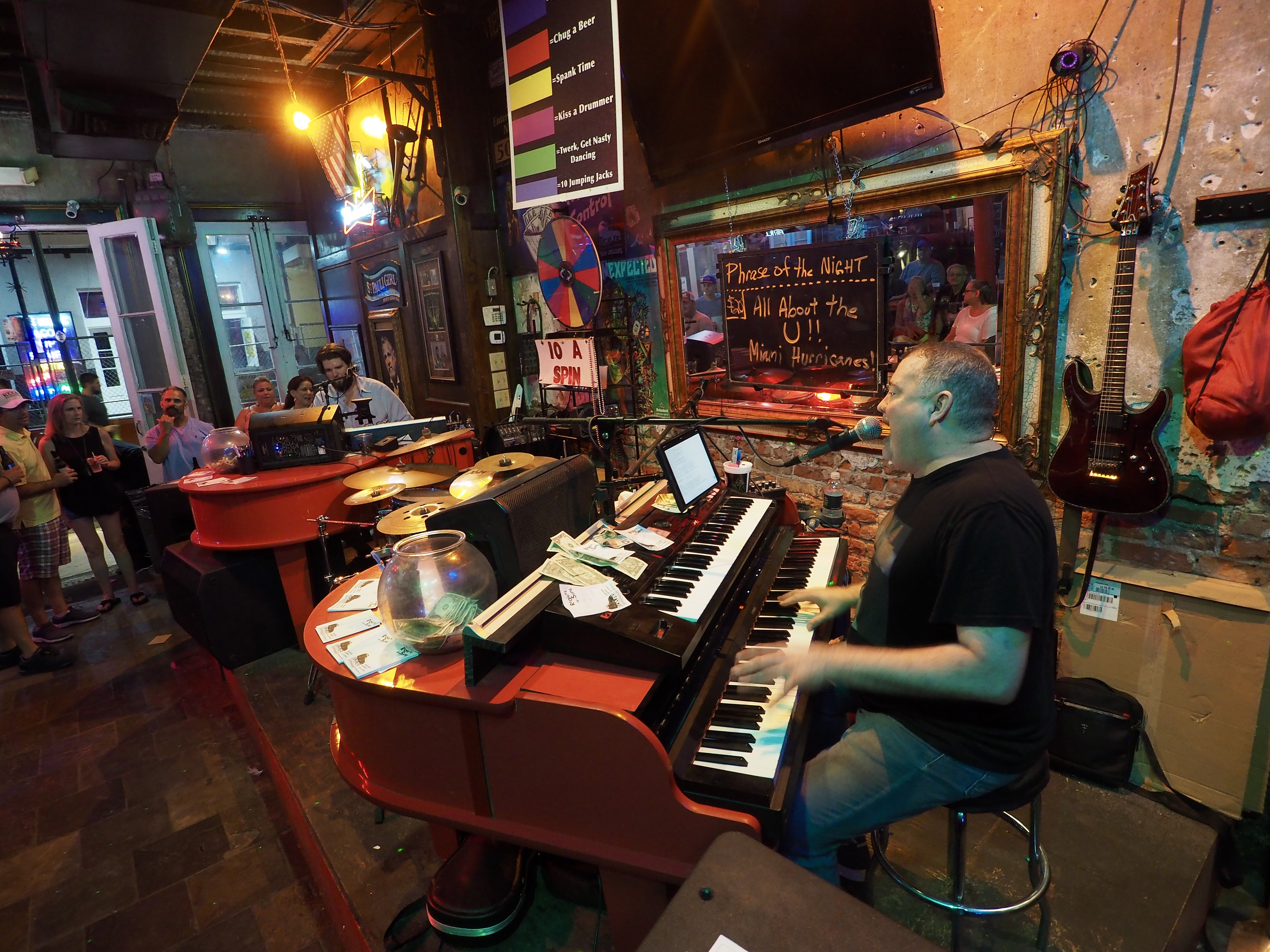
Dueling piano players at Tickler's Bar in New Orleans

Dueling pianos (also known simply as "sing-along") is a form of entertainment, usually on stage with two grand pianos, each played by a professional player who sings and entertains; humor and audience participation are prevalent. Usually these types of piano bars have substantial sound systems, and most of the songs performed are rock and roll, "classic rock", Top 40, R&B, or country, played primarily by request. The modern format originated in late 1986 at Alley Cats in Dallas, Texas, and was based on the old-style dueling pianos still found at Pat O'Brien's Bar in New Orleans.

== History ==
Literal dueling pianos can be verified as early as the late 1890s, when ragtime piano players would actually "duel" in an effort to see who could play better and faster. In 1933, when B.H. O'Brien and Charlie Cantrell opened Pat O'Brien's Bar in New Orleans, they included a room where two piano players would entertain the crowd on copper-topped baby grand pianos. Players would take turns singing songs requested by the audience, written on cocktail napkins.

In 1986, a piano bar called Dallas Alley (a.k.a. "Alley Cats") opened in Dallas, Texas, as an attempt to copy the piano bar style of New Orleans. Players at this club started redefining the style of dueling pianos by playing more contemporary rock and roll music, coupled with humorous bits that involved lyric substitutions and audience participation. These "bits" would become commonplace at many dueling piano clubs over the years, as a staple of the industry. From there, many dueling piano clubs and chains opened, and there are currently well over 200 different clubs across the United States, and even more in other countries. The name of the concept has also evolved to be called "sing-along" since the goal of the players is not generally to work against each other, but rather to gain audience participation with singing and clapping. This is widely accepted as the current incarnation of dueling pianos/sing-along.

== Show format ==
A typical dueling pianos show normally features two to four piano players. They can work in teams throughout the night, taking audience requested songs. Generally, tips are expected when a song request is made, and priority may be given to a song with a larger denomination bill. Upon a tip, the players will often play the fight song of whatever college is requested too, which often results in bidding wars between alumni and students of various universities in attendance. Patrons can also request that an audience member be brought on stage. Generally, this is to celebrate a birthday, bachelorette party, bachelor party, anniversary, or other occasion. The player then performs a "calldown" in which the participant (or participants) is embarrassed in a light-hearted fashion. Calldowns may be parodies of well known songs, or simply original material intended to generate a reaction from the audience.

"Bits" are comedic routines or audience participation, many woven in the songs themselves. A commonly used bit can be found in the song "Joy to the World", by Three Dog Night, as one piano player will teach the crowd "sign language" that accompanies the song, then bringing up an audience member to demonstrate.

- Video Example of Dueling Pianos, "The Devil Went Down To Georgia"
- Video example of a dueling pianos performance during an NFL event featuring the Jacksonville Jaguars at Wembley Stadium

== Songs ==
Commonly requested songs at a dueling piano bar can include almost any genre, and are generally accompanied by a monetary tip.

Examples:

- Don't Stop Believin'
- Piano Man
- Tiny Dancer
- Great Balls of Fire
- Bennie and the Jets
- Sweet Caroline
- Friends in Low Places
- Baby Got Back
- Paradise by the Dashboard Light
- Hotel California
- Brown Eyed Girl
- Lucille
- Joy to the World
- Bohemian Rhapsody
- The Devil Went Down to Georgia

Many of the songs requested do not fall into the typical "piano bar" category, and many dueling piano players pride themselves on their ability to perform songs that are generally not considered as such, like those from hard rock and rap genres.

== See also ==
- Piano bar
- Dueling Banjos
