= Meadow Gold Dairies (Hawaii) =

Dairy company operating in Hawaii

- Formerly: Dairymen's Association
- Type: Subsidiary
- Industry: Dairy
- Headquarters: Honolulu, U.S.
- Brands: Pog
- Owner: Bahman Sadeghi
- Website: https://mgdhawaii.com

Meadow Gold Dairies, originally the "Dairymen's Association" when it was formed in 1897 from the combination of seven dairy businesses, is a dairy company operating in Hawaii. Beatrice Foods purchased the company in 1953. In 1959 the company's name was changed to "Meadow Gold Dairies". In 1964 Waimea dairy was acquired and in 1966 Greenwell Dairy was acquired. In the 1960's and 1970's Meadow Gold marketed several dairy products, advertising them in print and televised media, under the Viva brand. In 1986 Beatrice Foods acquired Meadow Gold Dairies. Additional acquisitions of dairies took place in the following years and in recent decades the ice cream manufacturing plant was closed.

Dean sold parts of Meadow Gold Hawaii (its operations in Kauai, Maui, and Hilo) and the Meadow Gold IP to a local group in April 2020. The Honolulu plant was shut down after a deal to find a new buyer fell through that same month: its former employees have filed suits against Dean Foods for withdrawing their remaining paychecks from their accounts after having been promised that it would be deposited before ceasing operations. On May 15, 2021, Bahman Sadeghi (A Big Island Dairy Farmer) bought Meadow Gold Dairies. He opened a Waipahu distribution center shortly after.

Meadow Gold Dairies of Hawaii has been marketed with characters (List of American advertising characters) Lani Moo from 1949 (after a contest sponsored by its predecessor Dairymen's Association) and Poglodyte from 1971 until the present.

The company produces the POG drink, a tropical style juice drink.

The Dairymens surf site in Kawailoa, O'ahu is named for the Dairymen's Association that had a dairy farm across the Kamehameha Highway from Kawailoa Beach and scented the beach during offshore breezes. The name was shortened to Dairies and eventually fell into disuse.
