= Passion fruit (fruit) =

Fruit of several passion flower species

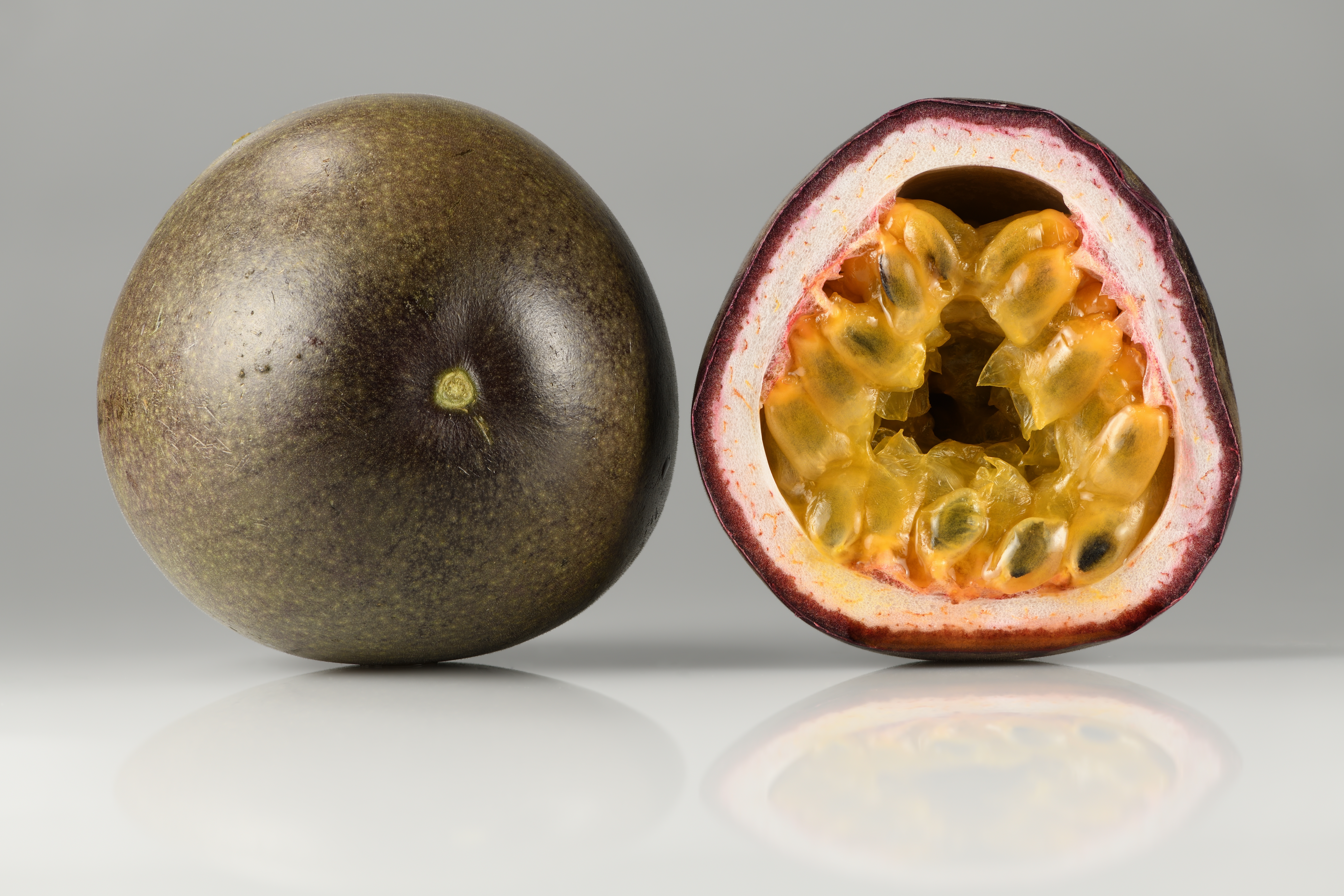
Passion fruits, whole (left) and halved (right).

The passion fruit (Portuguese: maracujá and Spanish: maracuyá, both from the Tupi murukuîá) and granadilla is the fruit of several plants in the genus Passiflora. It is native to subtropical regions of South America from southern Brazil through Paraguay to northern Argentina. The fruit is eaten for its pulp and seeds, and as a juice.

The name passion fruit derives from 18th century Christian missionaries who interpreted the flower as a religious symbol. The passion fruit spread throughout Africa, Europe, Australia, North America, and South America throughout the 1800s and 1900s.

== Description ==
Passion fruits are round or oval, and range from a width of 1.5–3 inches (3.81–7.62 centimeters). They can be yellow, red, purple, or green.

== Etymology ==
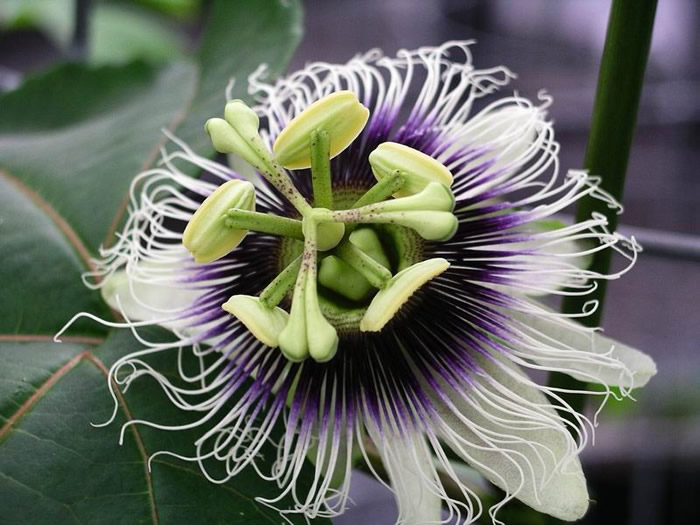
Passion fruit flower

=== Maracujá ===
The Portuguese maracujá and Spanish maracuyá are both derived from the Old Tupi murukuîá.

=== Passion fruit ===
The term "passion fruit" in English comes from the passion flower, as an English translation of the Latin genus name, Passiflora, and may be spelled "passion fruit", "passionfruit", or "passion-fruit". Around 1700, the name Passiflora was given by missionaries in Brazil as an educational aid to convert the Indigenous inhabitants to Christianity: its name was flor das cinco chagas or "flower of the Five Wounds" to illustrate the crucifixion of Christ and his resurrection, with other plant components also named after instruments of the Passion of Jesus.

== Varieties ==
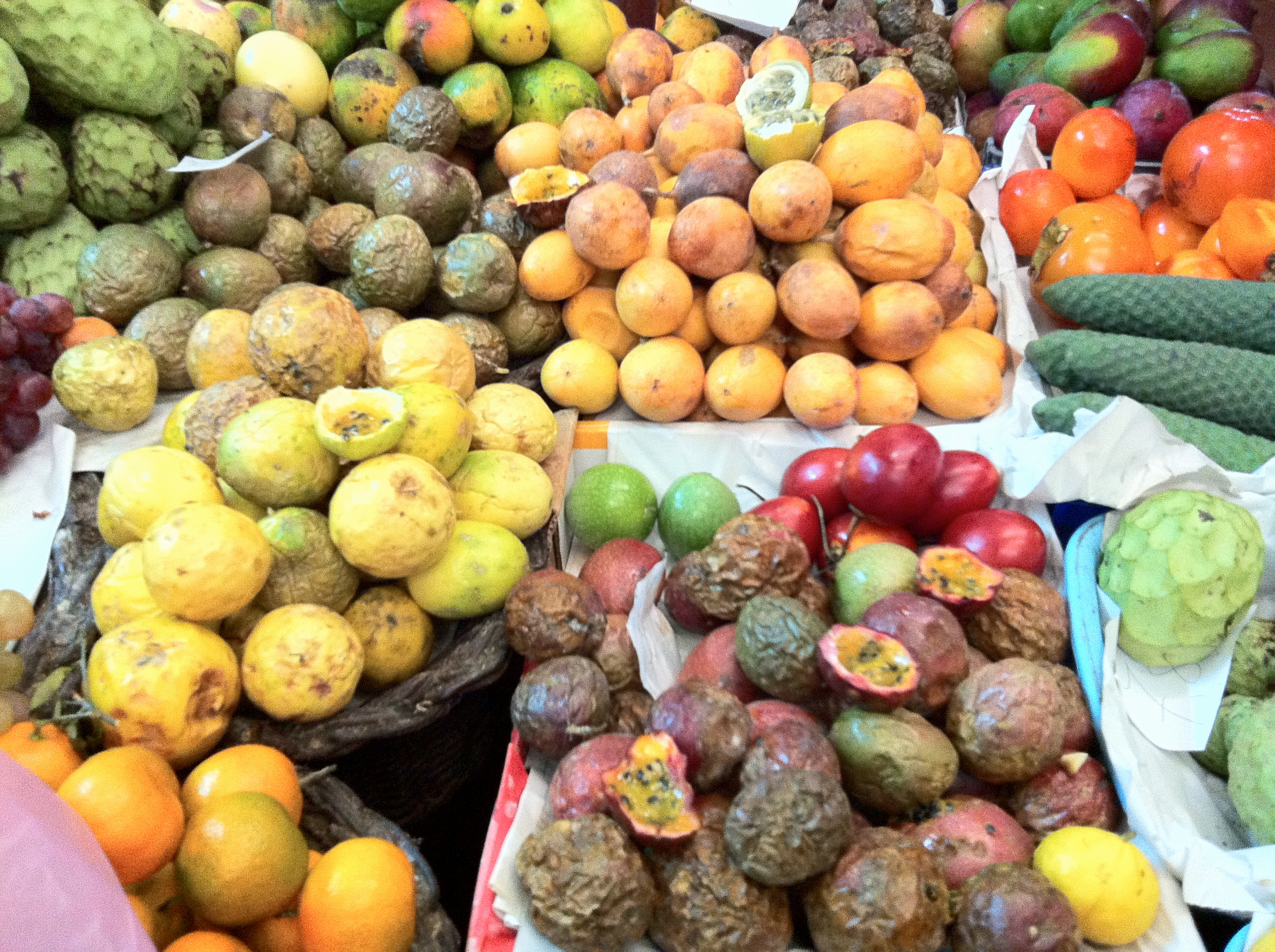
A variety of passion fruits at a market in Portugal

Edible passion fruits can be divided into at least five main types:

- purple passion fruit (fruits of Passiflora edulis Sims)
- yellow passion fruit (Passiflora edulis f. flavicarpa Deg.)
- sweet granadilla (Passiflora ligularis)
- giant granadilla (Passiflora quadrangularis L.)
- banana passion fruit (fruits of Passiflora tarminiana)

== Uses ==
The fruits are mainly consumed and have a juicy, edible center of many seeds. The parts of the fruit eaten are the pulpy, juicy seeds. Passion fruits are commonly squeezed to make juice, or used for pastries and other baked products, and as an ice cream flavor. When passion fruit seeds are added to snack bars, the dietary fiber content rose from 4.17% to 5.66% while the fat content rose from 15.02% to 19.63%.

== Composition ==
=== Nutrition ===
Passion fruit (granadilla) purple, raw per 100 grams
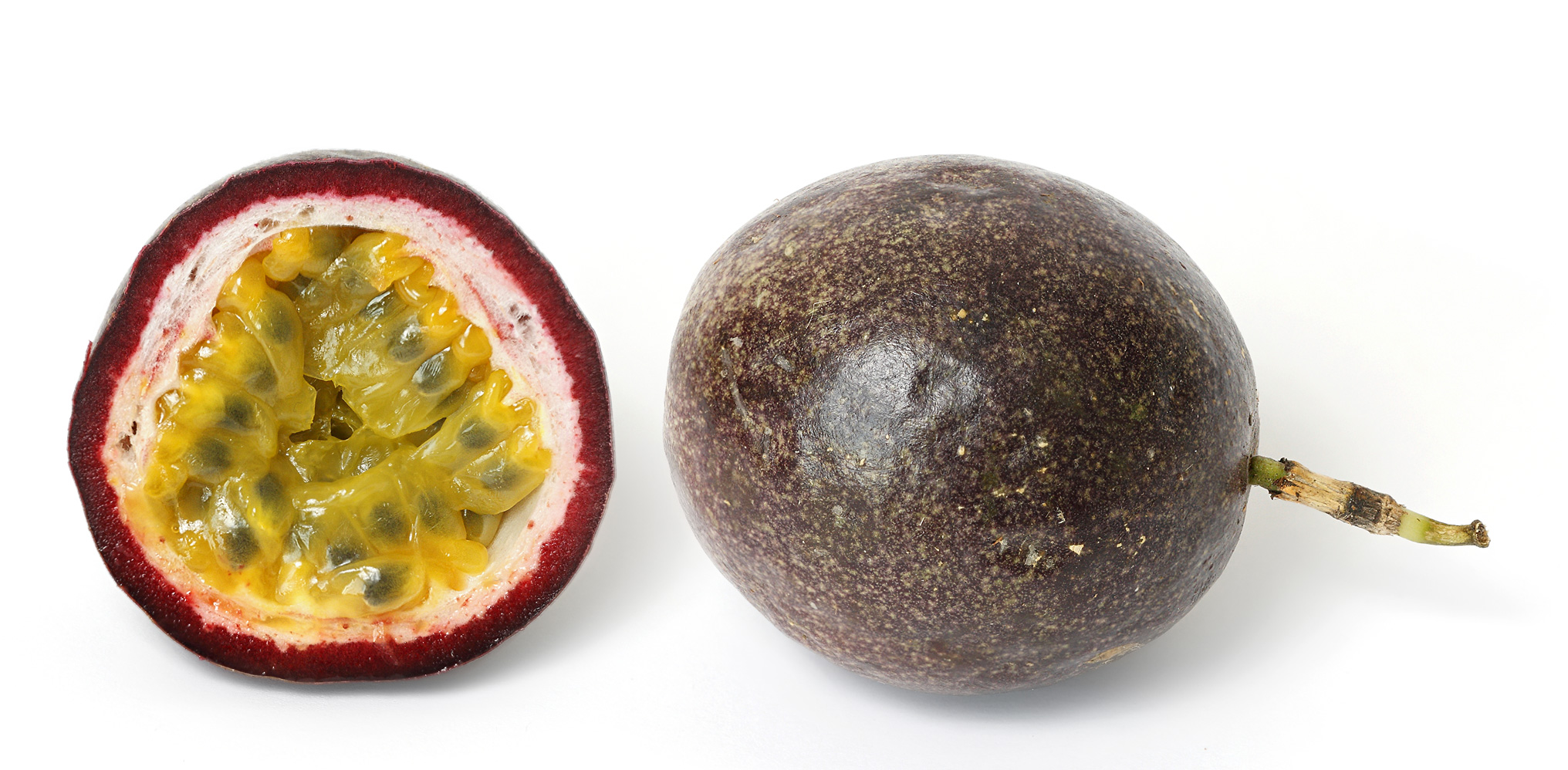

Nutritional value per 100 g (3.5 oz)
- Energy: 406 kJ (97 kcal)
- Carbohydrates: 23.4 g
- Sugars: 11.2 g
- Dietary fiber: 10.4 g
- Fat: 0.7 g
- Protein: 2.2 g
Vitamins and minerals
| Vitamins | Quantity %DV^{†} |
| Vitamin A equiv. beta-Carotene | 7% 64 μg 7% 743 μg |
| Riboflavin (B2) | 10% 0.13 mg |
| Niacin (B3) | 9% 1.5 mg |
| Vitamin B6 | 6% 0.1 mg |
| Folate (B9) | 4% 14 μg |
| Choline | 1% 7.6 mg |
| Vitamin C | 33% 30 mg |
| Vitamin K | 1% 0.7 μg |
| Minerals | Quantity %DV^{†} |
| Calcium | 1% 12 mg |
| Iron | 9% 1.6 mg |
| Magnesium | 7% 29 mg |
| Phosphorus | 5% 68 mg |
| Potassium | 12% 348 mg |
| Sodium | 1% 28 mg |
| Zinc | 1% 0.1 mg |
- Other constituents: Quantity
- Water: 72.9 g
- Full Link to USDA Database entry
- ^{†}Percentages estimated using US recommendations for adults, except for potassium, which is estimated based on expert recommendation from the National Academies.

Raw passion fruit is 73% water, 23% carbohydrates, 2% protein, and 1% fat (table). In a reference amount of 100 g (3.5 oz), raw passion fruit supplies 97 calories and is a rich source of vitamin C (33% of the Daily Value, DV) and a moderate source of riboflavin and potassium (table). No other micronutrients are in significant content (table).

=== Phytochemicals ===
Several varieties of passion fruit are rich in polyphenols, and some contain prunasin and other cyanogenic glycosides in the peel and juice.

== History ==
Passion fruit originates from South America, specifically from the region stretching from southern Brazil through Paraguay to northern Argentina. The fruit has been cultivated since ancient times, primarily by Indigenous communities in these areas. It was later introduced to Europe in 1553 by Spanish and Portuguese colonists.

== Gallery ==
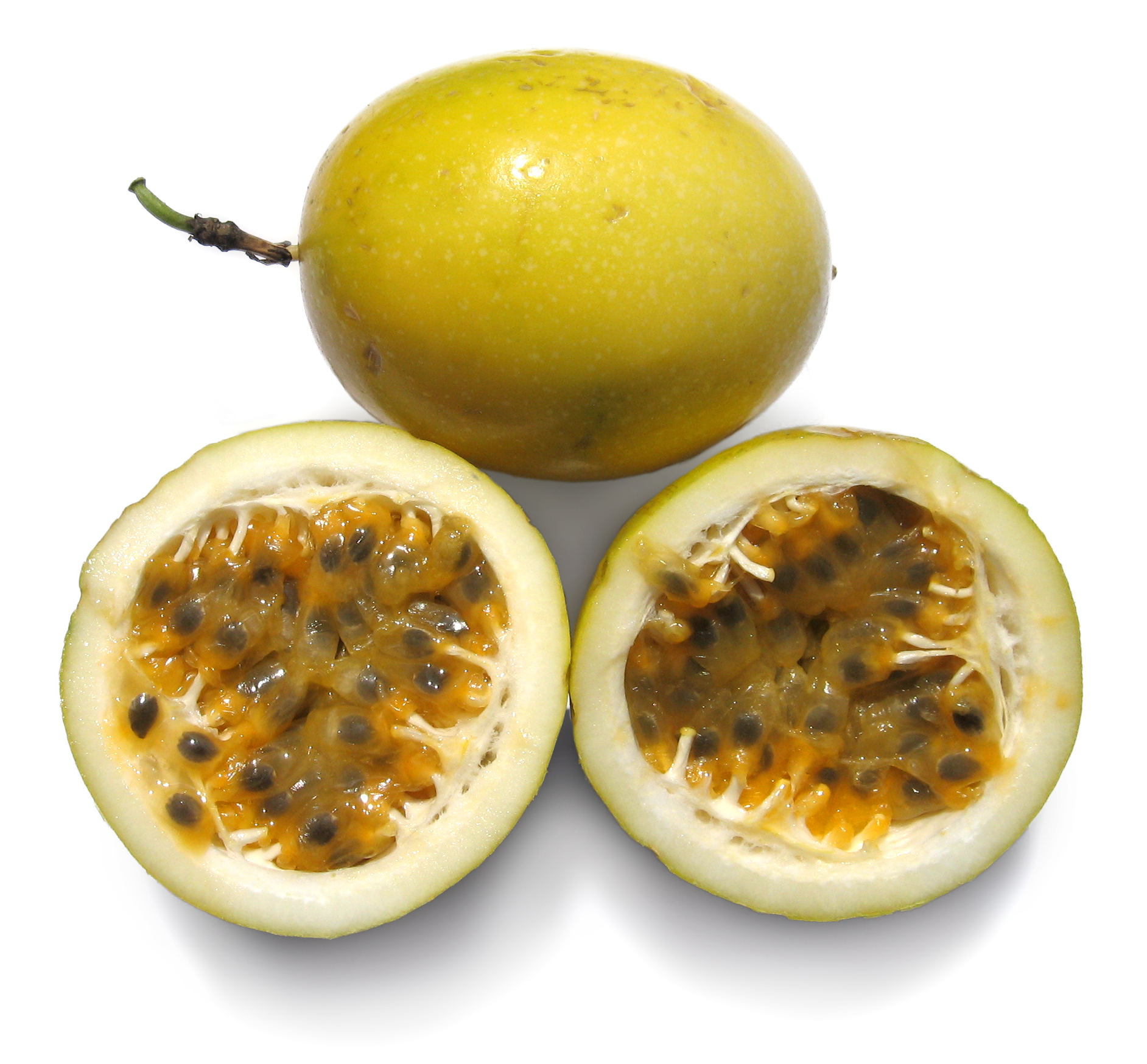
Yellow passion fruit (Passiflora edulis f. flavicarpa)

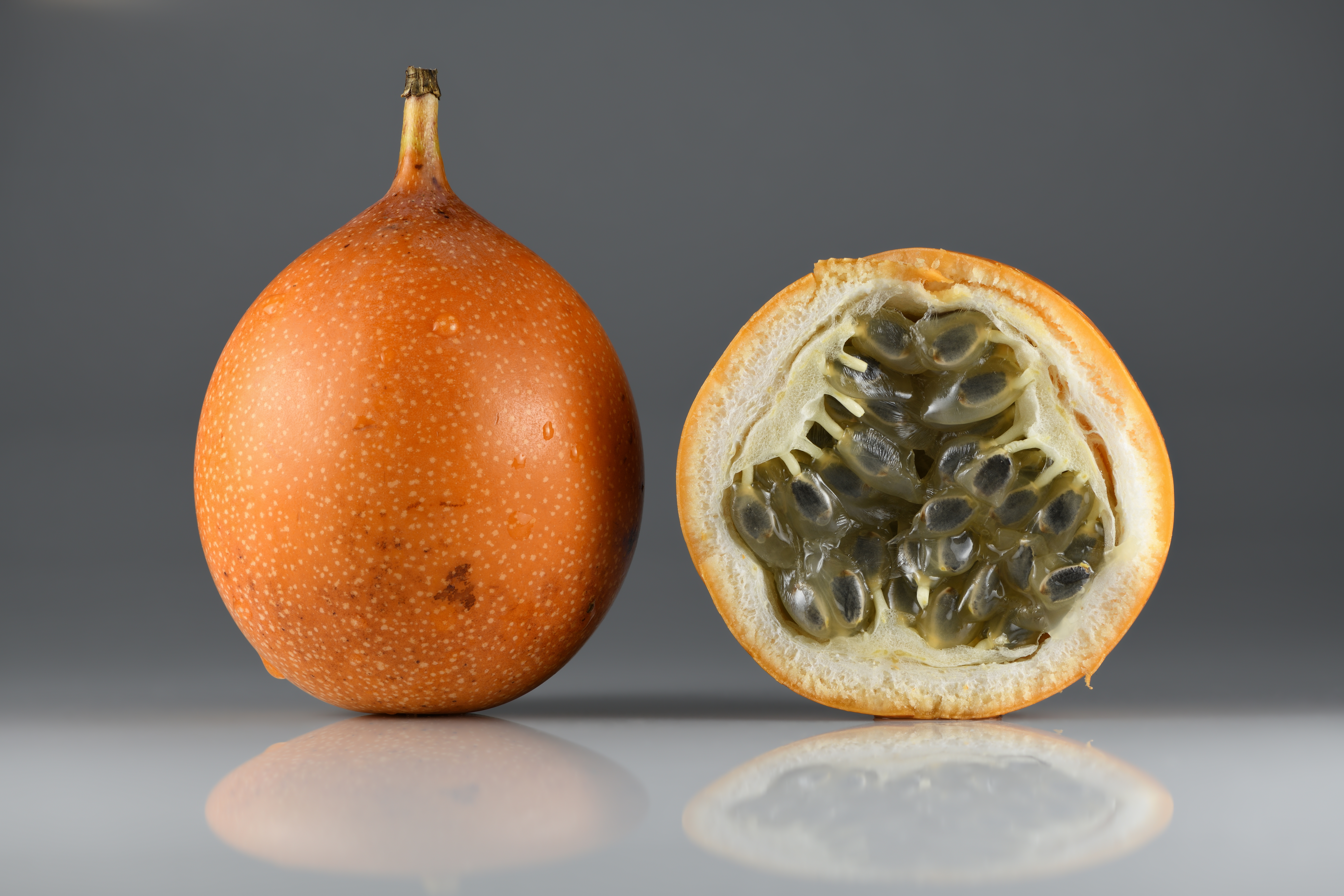
Passiflora ligularis fruit

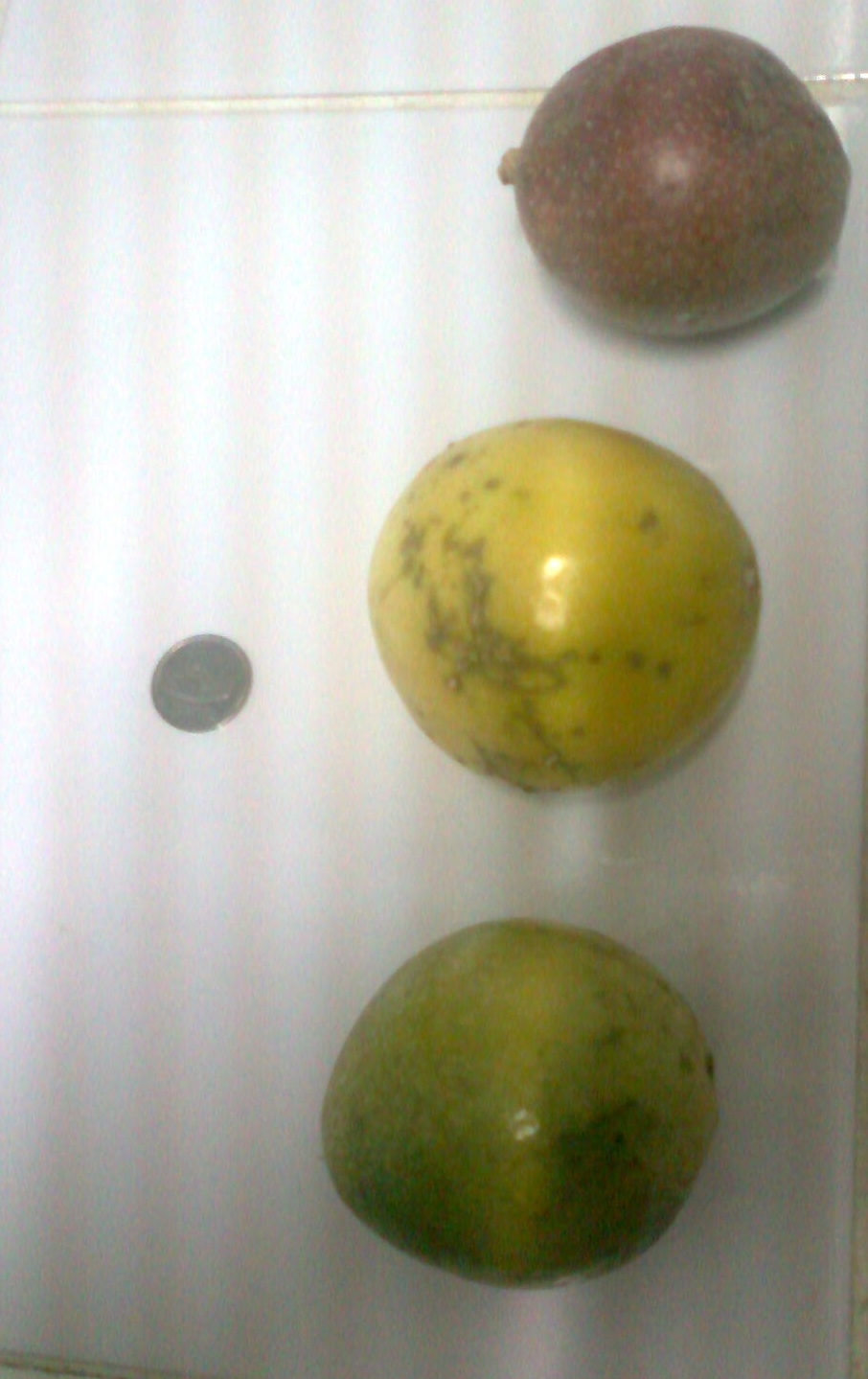
Red, yellow, and green Passiflora edulis

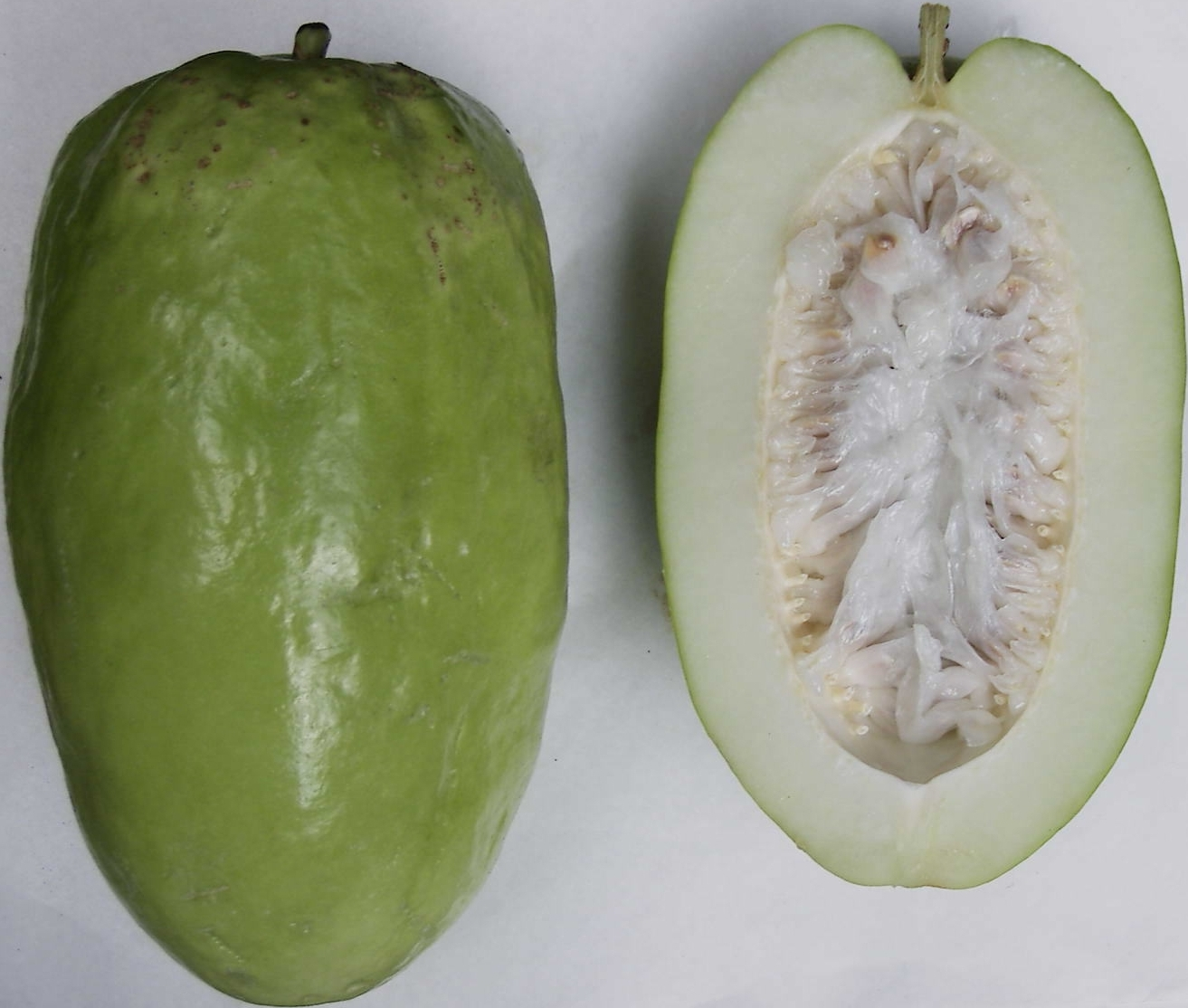
Giant granadilla (Passiflora quadrangularis L.)

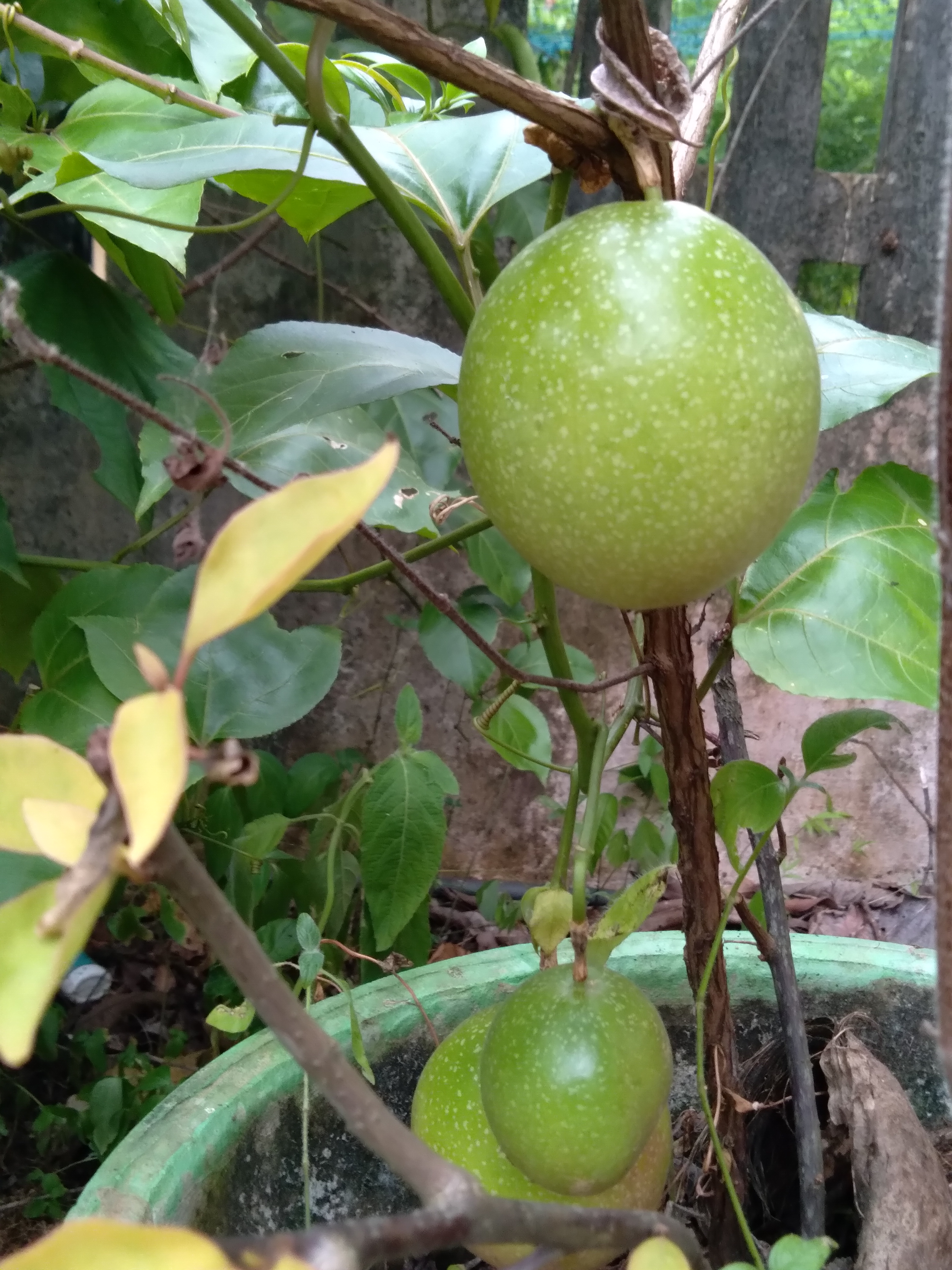
Unripe common passion fruit

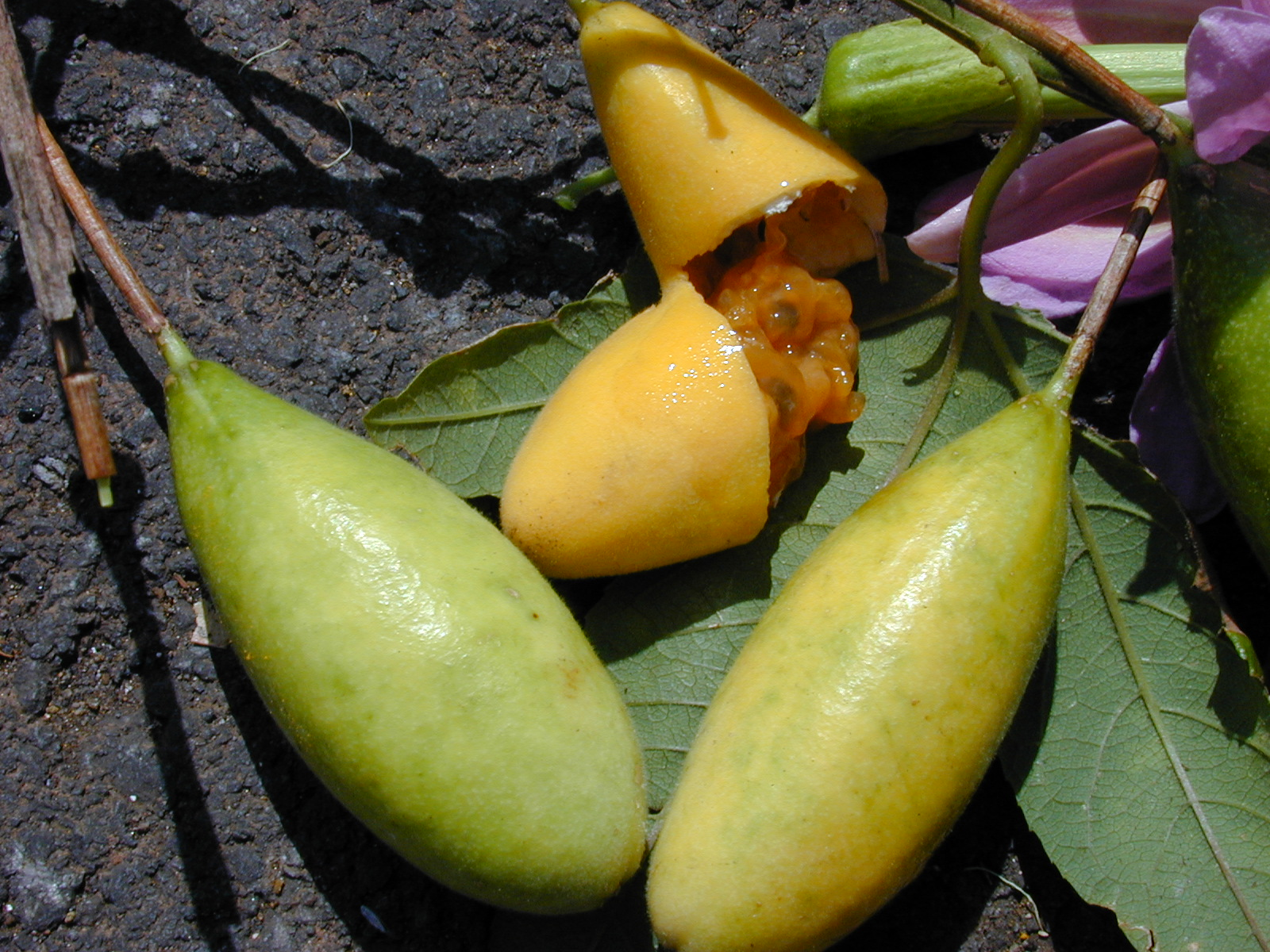
Banana passionfruit, Passiflora tarminiana

== See also ==
- Fassionola
- Passiona
- POG juice
