= Atomic (cocktail) =

Champagne cocktail

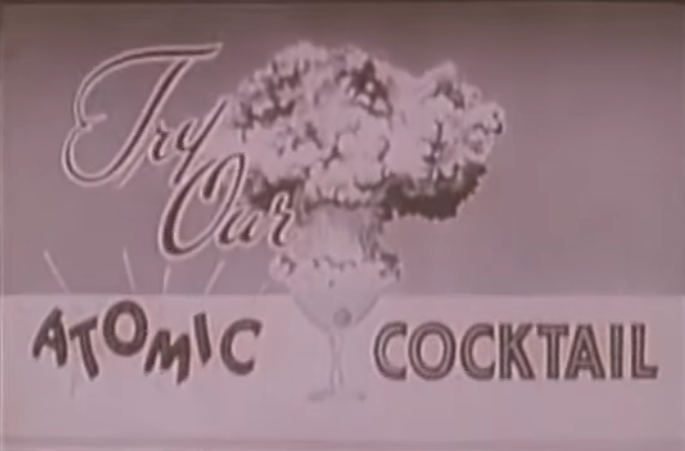
Atomic Cocktail advertisement

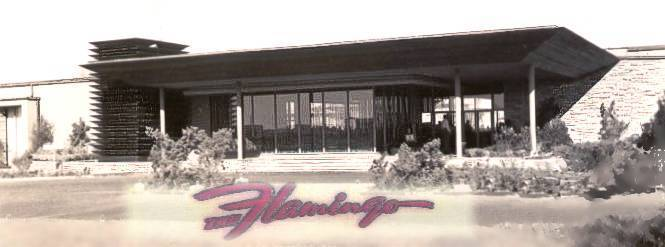
The Flamingo Hotel

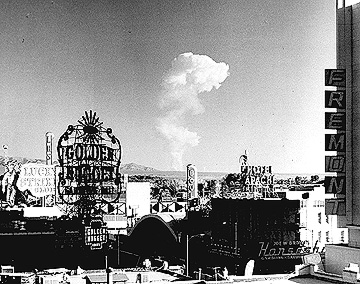
Mushroom cloud near Las Vegas

The Atomic cocktail is a champagne cocktail that was popularized by the Las Vegas Chamber of Commerce and local casinos in the 1950s. During this period, Las Vegas was sometimes called the "Atomic City".

The name has been used generically to refer to many similarly themed cocktails that were created around the same period, usually referencing atoms, nuclear fission, or rocket flights.

== Recipe ==
An Atomic cocktail recipe as described by cocktail historian David Wondrich calls for equal parts vodka and brandy (or Cognac) that is either stirred or shaken with a small amount of sherry, then strained, and finally mixed with Brut (dry) champagne, frequently described as being garnished with an orange wedge. A US Army information film from the era featured some versions that were actively bubbling, likely the effect of dry ice.

== Other versions ==
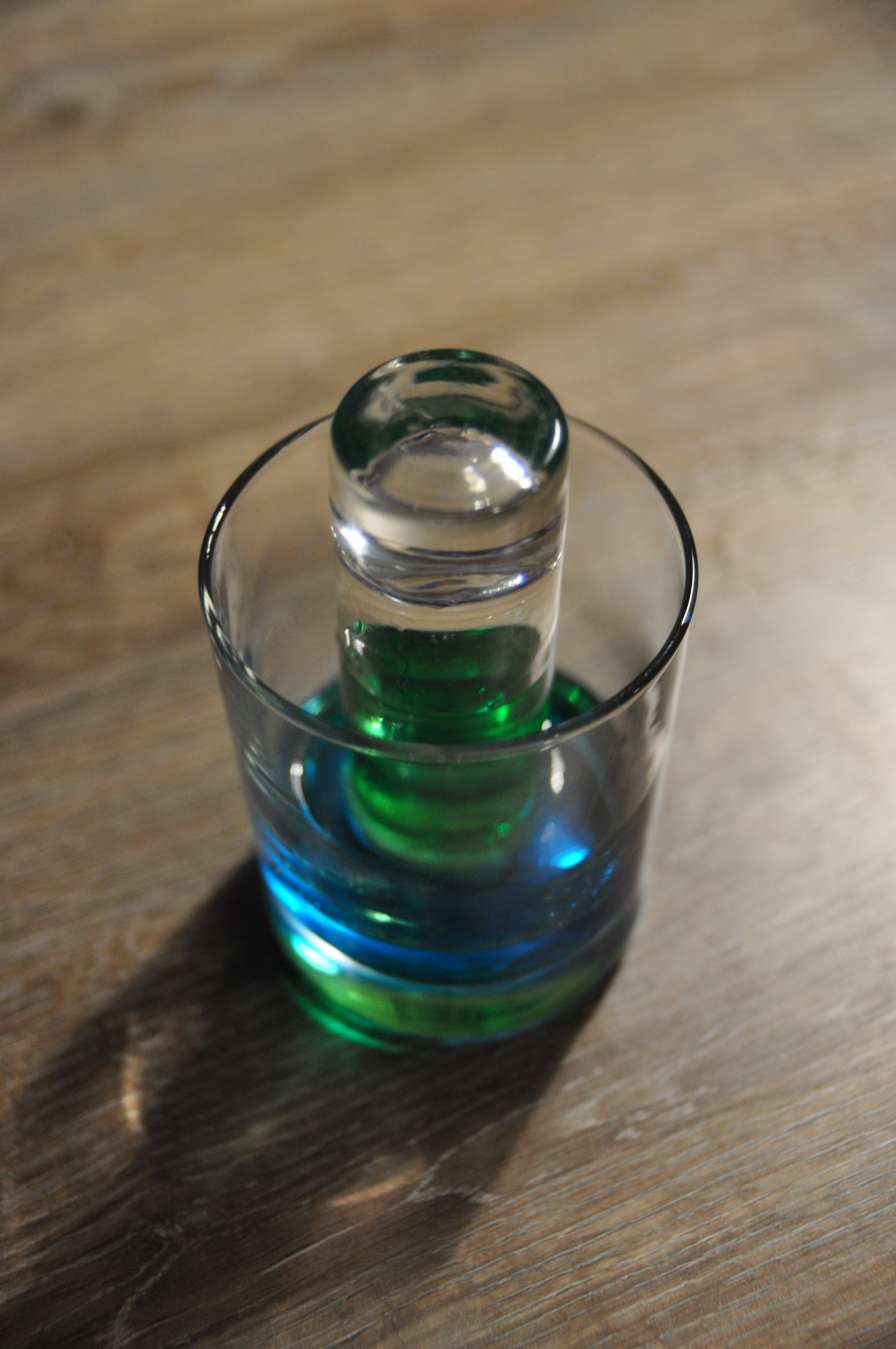
An "Atomic Reactor" cocktail

The Atomic Age, Jet Age and Space Age influenced popular culture in terms of architecture, furniture, fabrics, and style, and began to popularize many such themed cocktail names during these times. In his 1998 book Atomic Cocktails, Gideon Bosker discusses the term and lists drink recipes inspired from this period with such names as the Rocket Man, Apricot Fission, and Cognac Zoom. Its Ray Gun cocktail calls for 2 oz. of green Chartreuse mixed with 1 oz. of blue Curaçao and ice, strained, and topped off with champagne. The Oppenheimer Martini is a recipe allegedly modified by the scientist when he was unable to sneak enough vermouth into top secret facilities.

Various "atomic" cocktails were served in the panoramic Sky Room of the Desert Inn, which had the highest view in Las Vegas at the time. Patrons reportedly "drank like fish" and sang songs as they watched atomic bomb tests detonate in the distance.

Sven Kirsten, who wrote The Book of Tiki, called tiki bars “the emotional bomb shelter of the Atomic Age.” Jeff Berry in the Beachbum Berry Remixed drink guide noted that almost every tiki bar served cocktails with names like the Flying Saucer and Star Fire. Some tiki drinks had names related to more basic aviation prior to this, such as Donn Beach's Q.B. Cooler and Test Pilot, and Trader Vic's two-person PB2Y cocktail (named after the Navy's Coronado plane). Trader Vic's revised Bartender's Guide later listed newer Space Needle, Panoramic Punch and Milky Way cocktails.

== Potential name origins or influences ==
- In nuclear medicine, an atomic cocktail is also used to describe a real-life radioactive mixture that is drunk by patients with hyperthyroidism and was discovered in 1941 through the work of Dr. Saul Hertz and others.
- The "Atomic Cocktail" song was released by Slim Gaillard in 1945 and included the following lyrics:

"It's the drink that you don't pour, now when you take one sip you won't need anymore
You're small as a beetle or big as a whale, Boom! Atomic Cocktail"

== Bars ==
Atomic Liquors is a historic bar in Las Vegas that sells Atomic cocktails. Owners at the time Joe and Stella Sobchik renamed their bar Atomic Liquors in 1952.

== See also ==
- Miss Atomic (pageants)
- National Atomic Testing Museum
- Atomic tourism

== Additional resources ==
- Smithsonian video: How 1950s Las Vegas sold atomic bomb testing as tourism
- 1982 documentary The Atomic Cafe (Kino Lorber), (official Youtube link)
- Atomic Age Paintings at Chadron State College
