= Heublein =

American alcohol and food distributor

Heublein Inc.
- Final logo from 1973, designed by Lippincott & Margulies
- Traded as: NYSE: HBL
- Industry: Cocktails; Food and beverage Hotels; Quick service restaurants Restaurants
- Founded: 1862
- Defunct: 1982 (as independent co.); 1998 (dissolved)
- Successor: International Distillers & Vintners
- Headquarters: Hartford, Connecticut, US
- Key people: John A. Powers (chairman and CEO); Robert M. Furek (president & COO)
- Number of employees: 28,500

Heublein Inc. (also known as Heublein Spirits) was an American producer and distributor of alcoholic beverages and food throughout the 20th century. During the 1960s and 1970s its stock was regarded as one of the most stable financial investments, earning it inclusion in the Nifty Fifty.

It was acquired in 1982 by the R. J. Reynolds Tobacco Company. Its successor, RJR Nabisco, began selling off many of Heublein's assets in the years that followed, with the Heublein division purchased by Grand Metropolitan in 1987. After more sell-offs of Heublein brands, Grand Metropolitan ceased using the name, incorporating the business into International Distillers & Vintners.

== History ==
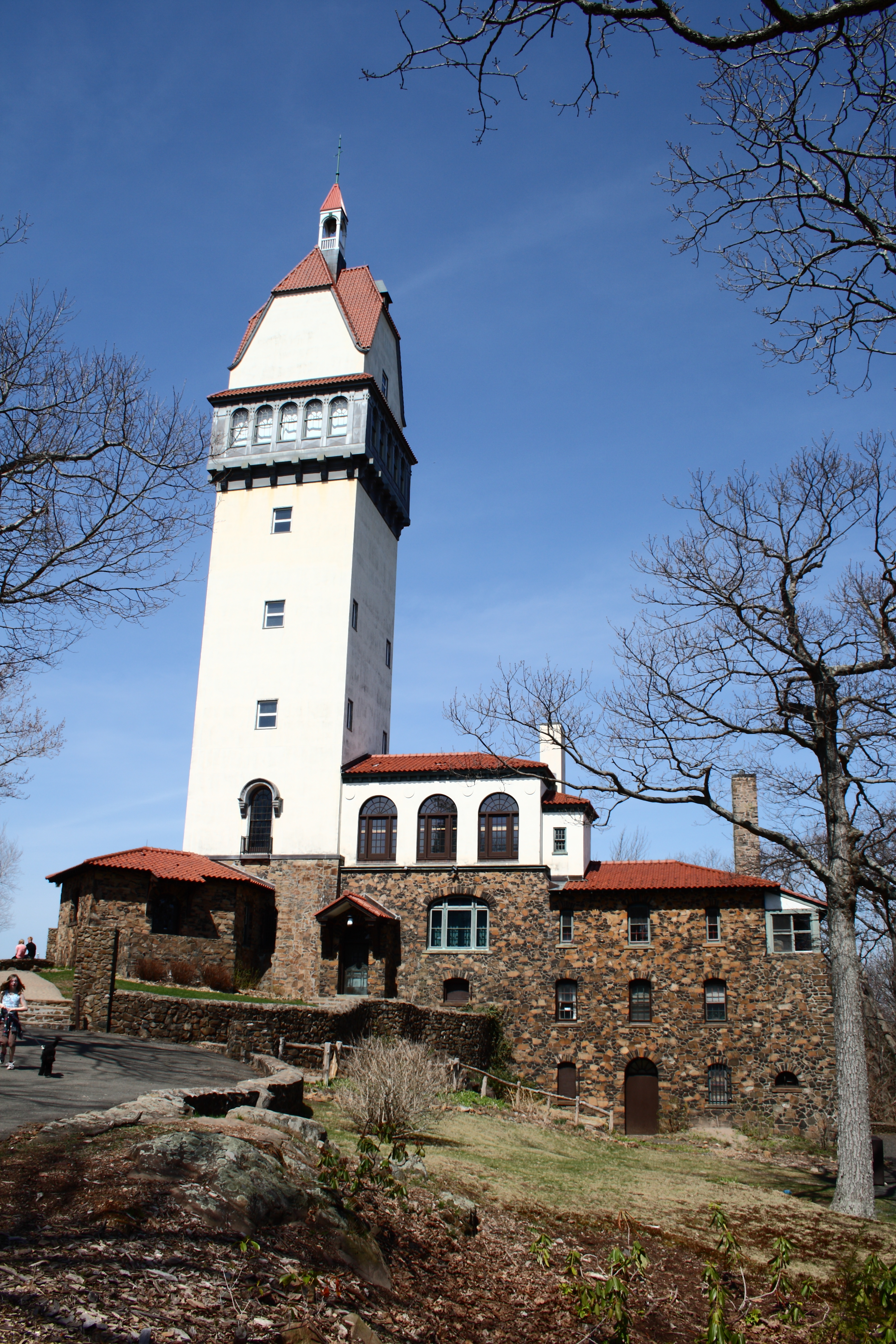
Heublein Tower in Simsbury, Connecticut

Heublein began as a restaurant founded in 1862 in Hartford, Connecticut, by Andrew Heublein, a German American entrepreneur. His two sons, Gilbert F. and Louis, soon joined the business. In 1875 they accepted a large order for pre-mixed martini and Manhattan cocktails for the annual picnic of the Governor's Foot Guard. (Note: The Connecticut Governor's Foot Guard a unit in the Connecticut state militia, originally charged with guarding and escorting the Governor of Connecticut.) Rain forced the event's cancellation. When a restaurant employee whom the brothers had instructed to dispose of the canceled cocktails several days later determined them to have withstood shelf storage safely, they began selling the pre-mixed cocktails from the restaurant. So popular were the ready-made cocktails that Heublein built a distillery just to satisfy the demand. When the focus of Andrew Heublein's business turned more heavily toward its lucrative line of ready-made cocktails in 1890, he transferred the business to his sons, and it became Gilbert F. Heublein and Bro. In 1892 they introduced their brand of “Club Cocktails” pre-mixed cocktails, an early form of ready to drink (RTD) cocktails.

In 1906, the business acquired the rights to distribute (and later produce) A1 Steak Sauce for the US market, under license from Brand & Co. Ltd. of Vauxhall, London, UK. Heublein began selling it in the US under the name "Brand's A.1. Sauce". (Note: Some sources have 1895 for the year of acquiring A1 Sauce rights, but 1895 doesn't fit well in the originating Brand & Co. Ltd.'s historical timeline in Britain, and is not supported by advertising collectibles on eBay until 1907. The source of the more likely A1 Sauce license date of 1906 describes it not as a license or rights, but that Heublein bought the whole company from England, something easily shown to be untrue by the English company and product's continued existence until 1959. Heublein kept the product name of Brand's A.1. Sauce into the middle of the 1930s, when the original brand name of Brand's was removed, along with the second of the two now larger dots in A•1•, as it became known as just A•1 Sauce. In the middle of the 1960s, the word "Steak" was inserted, just as the remaining dot was removed. By 1966, "A1 Steak Sauce" was the name that would endure beyond the 20th century. The 1906 introduction into America, along with minor name changes in the middle of the 1930s and 1960s decades are all well supported by a correlation between dates and the brand name in the advertising itself (not in the seller's loose description) of pertinent advertising collectibles, usually available on the eBay online auction web site.) It was a secondary sideline to Heublein's thriving cocktail business, with its promotions and advertising copy aimed at the "carriage trade", delivering to hotels and even directly to the consumer at home. When it incorporated in the State of Connecticut on December 2, 1915, Heublein already had offices in New York as well as Hartford. (Note: Some older descriptions of the company claimed Heublein had offices in London, UK and Frankfurt, Germany as soon as its incorporation, but there seems to be no reliable source indication or advertising evidence of this. The Great War had already been raging in Europe for eighteen months by the time of incorporation, and with its immediate aftermath establishing a new business market in Europe was impossible for the rest of that decade, as Europe's needs went beyond American condiment offices. In the 1920s, Heublein could sell only A1 Sauce, and held the rights to do so only in the US. It seems unlikely that it could get or would need a London and Frankfurt office until the repeal of Prohibition in 1933 at the earliest.) Upon the enactment of Prohibition in 1920, Heublein's "secondary sideline" of A.1. Sauce served as a fortunate savior, when the production, transportation and sale of all other Heublein products became illegal in the US for the next thirteen years.

In 1939 Heublein acquired all rights to Smirnoff Vodka, a brand that had been produced in Russia prior to the October Revolution. John G. Martin was president at the time and acquired the rights to Smirnoff Vodka for only $14,000. Even though the price was an incredible deal, the deal was known as "Martin's Folly" as sales were dismal. Martin developed a marketing campaign where they would travel from bar to bar, teaching the bartenders how to make the Moscow Mule in the signature copper mugs and taking Polaroid pictures (a new invention at that time as well). At each subsequent bar, they would show the happy people enjoying the beverage to grow the distribution of Smirnoff. Heublein is credited with popularizing vodka in the United States by marketing Smirnoff as "White Whiskey" with the phrase "leaves you breathless", possibly the source of the mistaken belief that vodka on the breath conveys no aroma of alcohol. Smirnoff became one of Heublein's most successful brands. Heublein also acquired distribution rights in the United States to many other international spirits, wines, and beers that include Irish Mist liqueur, Harvey's Bristol Cream, Don Q Rum, Jose Cuervo, Black & White, Bell's whisky, Lancer's wines, Guinness Stout, and Bass Ale.

Heublein's line of pre-mixed alcoholic cocktails comprised such traditional drinks as Manhattans, martinis, stingers, sidecars, and daiquiris, as well as such trendy drinks as the Brass Monkey, Pink Squirrel, Hobo's Wife, in addition to such Tiki drinks as the Mai Tai, Dr. Funk, and Navy Grog. In 1969, Heublein began selling some of these cocktails in eight-ounce cans. In the 1970s, Heublein introduced "Malcolm Hereford's Cow", a new line of flavored milk, 30-proof beverage (15% alcohol) that was popular primarily with women in particular, and college students of either gender. It became a fad briefly before vanishing into obscurity.

Heublein purchased Hamm's Brewery in 1965, selling it in 1973 to a group of Hamm's wholesalers, from whom Olympia Brewing Company bought it in 1975.

It also made many acquisitions outside of the liquor market, including Grey Poupon in 1936, Kentucky Fried Chicken in 1971, and Hart's Bakeries in 1972. In 1969, Heublein purchased a majority stake in United Vintners, which owned Inglenook, for $100 million. That same year, Heublein also purchased Beaulieu Vineyards for $8.5 million. These acquisitions gave Heublein one of the largest winemaking operations in the United States.

== Acquisition and sell-off ==
In 1982, the R. J. Reynolds Tobacco Company acquired Heublein Inc. for $1.4 billion. In the corporate reorganizations that followed the merger of R.J. Reynolds and Nabisco, the resulting corporation, RJR Nabisco, began selling off many of Heublein's assets. RJR Nabisco sold Kentucky Fried Chicken to PepsiCo in 1986 and sold the Heublein division and its alcoholic beverage brands to Grand Metropolitan in 1987.

In 1994, Heublein sold some of its wine and brandy business to Canandaigua Wine Company. In 1996, Grand Metropolitan ceased using the Heublein name, incorporating the business into International Distillers & Vintners.
