= Doctor (cocktail) =

The doctor cocktail is a pre-prohibition era cocktail that traces in drink guides to as far back as 1917, when it appeared in Hugo R. Ensslin's Recipes for Mixed Drinks. As originally described the cocktail called simply for Swedish Punsch mixed with lime juice.

Like many older cocktails, many variations with the same name have been created over time, and drink guides sometimes listed multiple variations in the same book. The core of the cocktail consists of Swedish punsch and some variation of citrus (lime, lemon, or orange), with later variations skewing away from lime and also adding Jamaican rum.

== Historical variations ==
After Ensslin's recipe, the doctor cocktail was also listed in Robert Vermiere's 1922 drink book where it dropped the use of lime, calling for 2 parts Swedish punsch, 1 part orange juice, and 1 part lemon juice (2:1:1 ratio).

Harry MacElhone's guide Harry Ciro's ABC of Mixing Cocktails listed the ingredients as equal parts Swedish punsch, orange juice, and lemon juice (1:1:1 ratio), as did a 1927 Italian version (1:1:1 ratio). MacElhone's guide however also carried an illustration for "The Recipe of the famous Dr. Cocktail" which called for 2/3 punsch and 1/3 lime juice, while suggesting that lemons could be substituted if one did not have limes on hand.

In 1936 fellow drink book author Frank Meier listed the cocktail as equal parts punsch and white rum, with a teaspoon each of orange and lemon juice.

Trader Vic's listed the ingredients as 1.5 oz. Swedish punsch, 3/4 oz. Jamaican rum, 1 tsp. orange juice, and 1 tsp. lemon juice. The guide also noted that equal parts Swedish punsch and rum could also be used, and that the juice of 1/2 a lime could take the place of the orange and lemon juice.

In 1948 Dave Embury noted that there were "several" versions of the cocktail and was going to list four in his book. The Doctor Cocktail No.1 listed Ensslin's original punsch and lime recipe. No.2 called for equal parts punsch, gin, and lemon juice. No.3 called for the more now common 2:1:1 ratio of punsch, orange juice, and lemon juice. No.4 called for 3 parts punsch, 2 parts Jamaican rum, and 1 part lime.

Difford's guide likewise lists four different versions, although not all the same as Embury's.

== Similar cocktails ==
In his 1941 bartender's book, "Crosby Gaige's Cocktail Guide and Ladies Companion", Gaige listed a drink that he called the Greta Garbo Bows, that called for one jigger of Swedish Punsch, 1/2 jigger of orange juice, and a 1/2 jigger of lemon juice. This was essentially Vermier's Doctor cocktail version from 1922. Despite the same ingredients, Gaige makes no mention of the doctor cocktail in his notes but says "shake well, strain into cocktail glass, and God bless Miss Garbo". Greta Garbo was a Swedish-American actress, a potential reason for the renaming of a drink that contained Swedish Punsch.

Another cocktail simply called the Greta Garbo calls for equal parts Swedish Punsch, gin, and lemon juice. This is the same drink as the Doctor No.2 from Emburry's 1948 cocktail guide.

== Later "doctor" cocktails ==
Early alcoholic concoctions were often thought of as "medicinal", and even in 1948 cocktail books were pondering such questions as "Why are rye and bourbon whiskies frequently prescribed by doctors and Scotch practically never?"

Other "doctor" cocktails include the Doctor Johnson, which was a tropical cocktail by design that called for 1/4 gin, 1/2 pineapple syrup, 1/8 passion fruit juice, and 1/8 lemon juice shaken with a dash of grenadine and egg white, making it a potential precursor for later Tiki drinks. The author of the particular cocktail guide, W.J. Tarling, did not provide notes as to whom the drink was named after, other than saying it was "invented by Tim Hollings". However, it is potentially telling that the book also included a recipe for the Doctor Johnson Jr, which contained no liquor. Dr. Samuel Johnson was a prolific English writer who is attributed with many quotes on the character of man and drinking. His alcohol problem and ultimate need for abstinence was well documented and he was quoted as saying "I can't drink a little, child, therefore I never touch it".

The Doctor Funk cocktail has more certainty as to its name and has been described as a Tiki drink precursor. Jeff Berry in Beachbum Berry Remixed states that, unlike most Tiki drinks that were called Polynesian but "made up" in California that "the Doctor Funk, alone among "Polynesian" drinks, does, in fact, have Polynesian roots". The drink was named after Dr. Bernard Funk, a German physician who was a doctor for Robert Louis Stevenson in Samoa. Berry provides evidence that the doctor was also a bartender in his own right and lists the drink as being a mixture of light Puerto Rican rum, lime juice, and pomegranate syrup stirred with a teaspoon of Pernod and club soda.

Trader Vic's attempt to "improve" the Dr. Funk was called Dr. Funk's Son.

Stephen Crane called his version of the Dr. Funk the Dr. Fong at The Luau and his Kon-Tiki chain of restaurants. Crane, who tongue in cheek referred to himself as high chief "Stefooma", claimed that a "Dr. Fong Foo" was also the overseer of the food and drinks at his The Luau restaurant. He additionally listed a Doc's Grog on his 1956 The Luau menu, which may have been a reference to Dr. Fong Foo, and was likely a rebranded Navy Grog (Crane called the Test Pilot the Jet Pilot, Don's Pearl became Steve's Pearl, etc.).

== Relationship to 21st century cocktail enthusiasts ==
Although similar in name, there is no formal connection between the Doctor cocktail and the author of the book Vintage Spirits & Forgotten Cocktails, written by Ted Haigh (aka, "Doctor Cocktail").

There is also no formal connection between the cocktail and Jeff Macpherson (aka, "Dr. Tiki", former host of Tiki Bar TV).

== See also ==
- List of cocktails
