= PB2Y (cocktail) =

Rum based drink

The PB2Y, or PB2Y Gremlin, is a tiki drink created by Victor Bergeron as part of a series of "gremlin" drinks for his Trader Vic's restaurants during World War II.

== Ingredients ==
The ingredients for the cocktail calls for 1 1/2 oz of silver rum, 1 1/2 oz of orange juice, 3/4 oz lemon juice, 1/2 oz orange curacao, 1/4 oz lime juice, and 1/4 oz grenadine, along with 3 cups of crushed ice and garnished with a gardenia. Bergeron's 1947 Bartender's Guide called for the drink to be served in a ceramic "gremlin bowl."

== History ==
Bergeron served three different sized versions of his Gremlin drinks depending on how many people would be drinking the cocktail. The P-40 Gremlin was for one person, the PB2Y Gremlin served two, and the B-17 Gremlin served four. Life magazine called them "formidable looking potions."

The drinks were in general named after the mythological Gremlin creatures that caused mechanical problems for World War II aviators. The PB2Y was a reference to the PB2Y Coronado military plane. As a morale builder Bergeron sent packages of his drinks to fliers in the South Pacific. The drink may have been part of the general competition between Bergeron and Donn Beach, who had served in World War II. Beach allegedly had a B-26 Bomber with a painted "Don the Beachcomber" on its fuselage named after him, and he had also created aviation themed cocktails such as the Q.B. Cooler and Test Pilot. The two frequently fought over drink recipes.

== Gremlin bowl ==
Similar to a Scorpion bowl, the PB2Y was typically served with long straws for sharing. The drink as served in a gremlin bowl featured a motif of a woman being chased across a tropical island by a Gremlin.

Few examples of the bowl exist in the 21st century, and they carry a resale value in the thousands of dollars.
