= Golden Gate, Oakland, California =

Golden Gate
- Neighborhood of Oakland
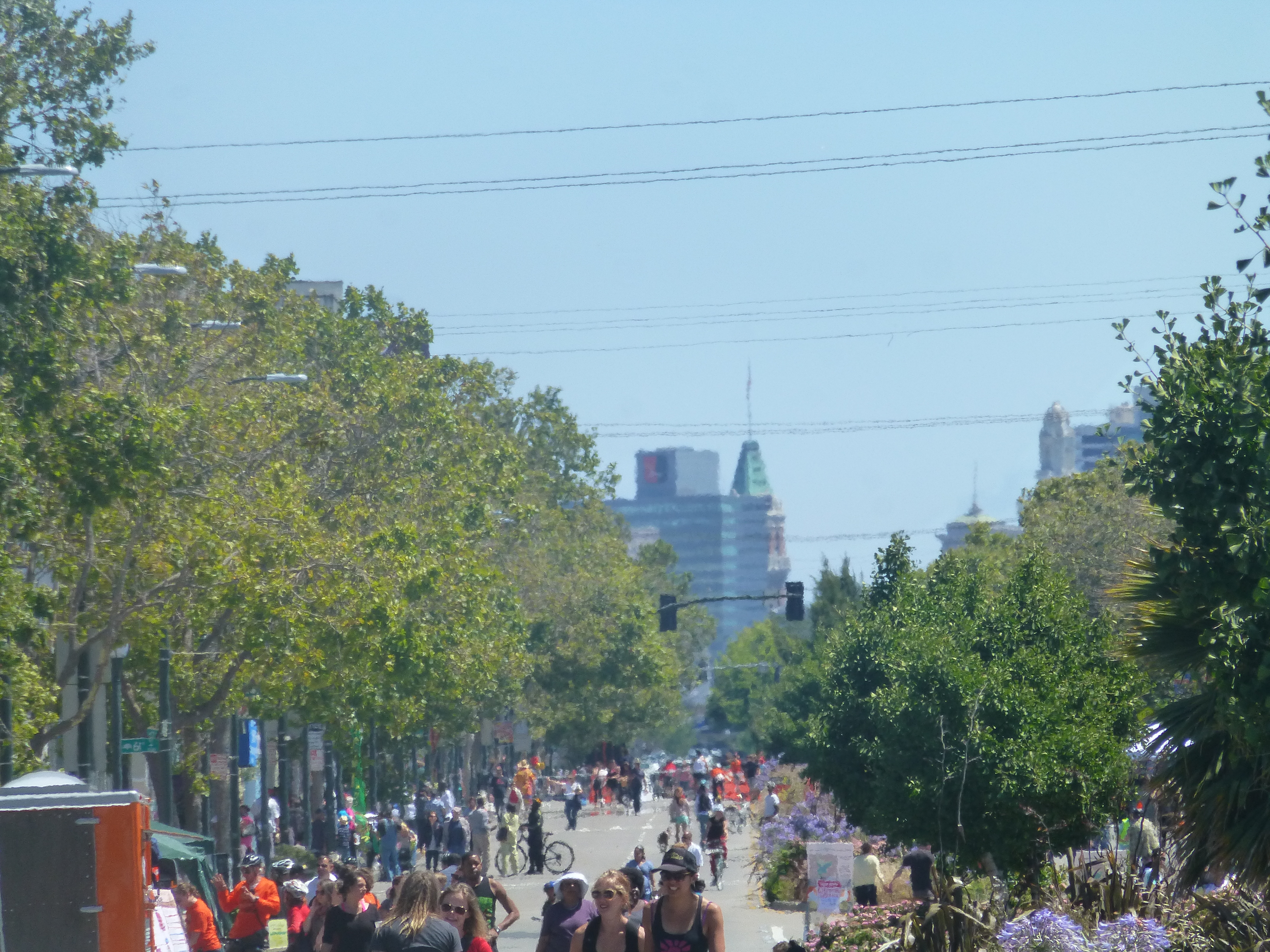
- San Pablo Avenue during Love Our Neighborhood Day 2014

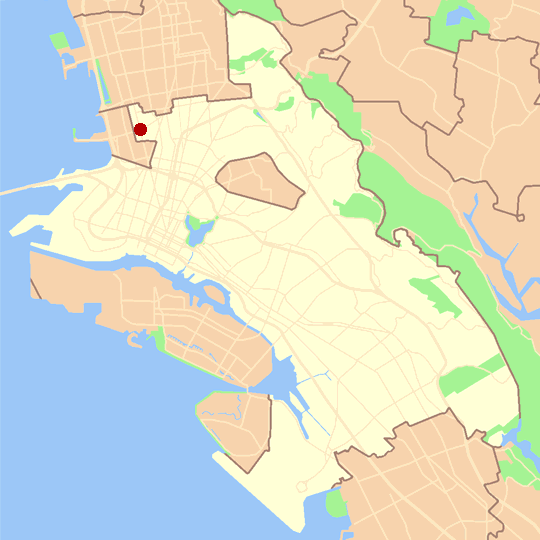
- Location of Golden Gate in Oakland
- Coordinates: 37.8447°N 122.2835°W
- Country: United States
- State: California
- County: Alameda
- City: Oakland

Government
  - Oakland City Council, District 1: Dan Kalb
- Elevation: 40 ft (12 m)
- Postal code: 94608

The Golden Gate neighborhood of Oakland, California is located in the northwest corner of the city, east of Emeryville and south of Berkeley. It includes the Golden Gate Shopping District, the stretch of San Pablo Avenue between 53rd Street on the south, and the Oakland-Berkeley border at 67th Street to the north. The neighborhood includes the area from a few blocks west of San Pablo Avenue (the Emeryville border) to Adeline Street on the east.

The district includes cafes and the San Pablo Arts District.

== History ==
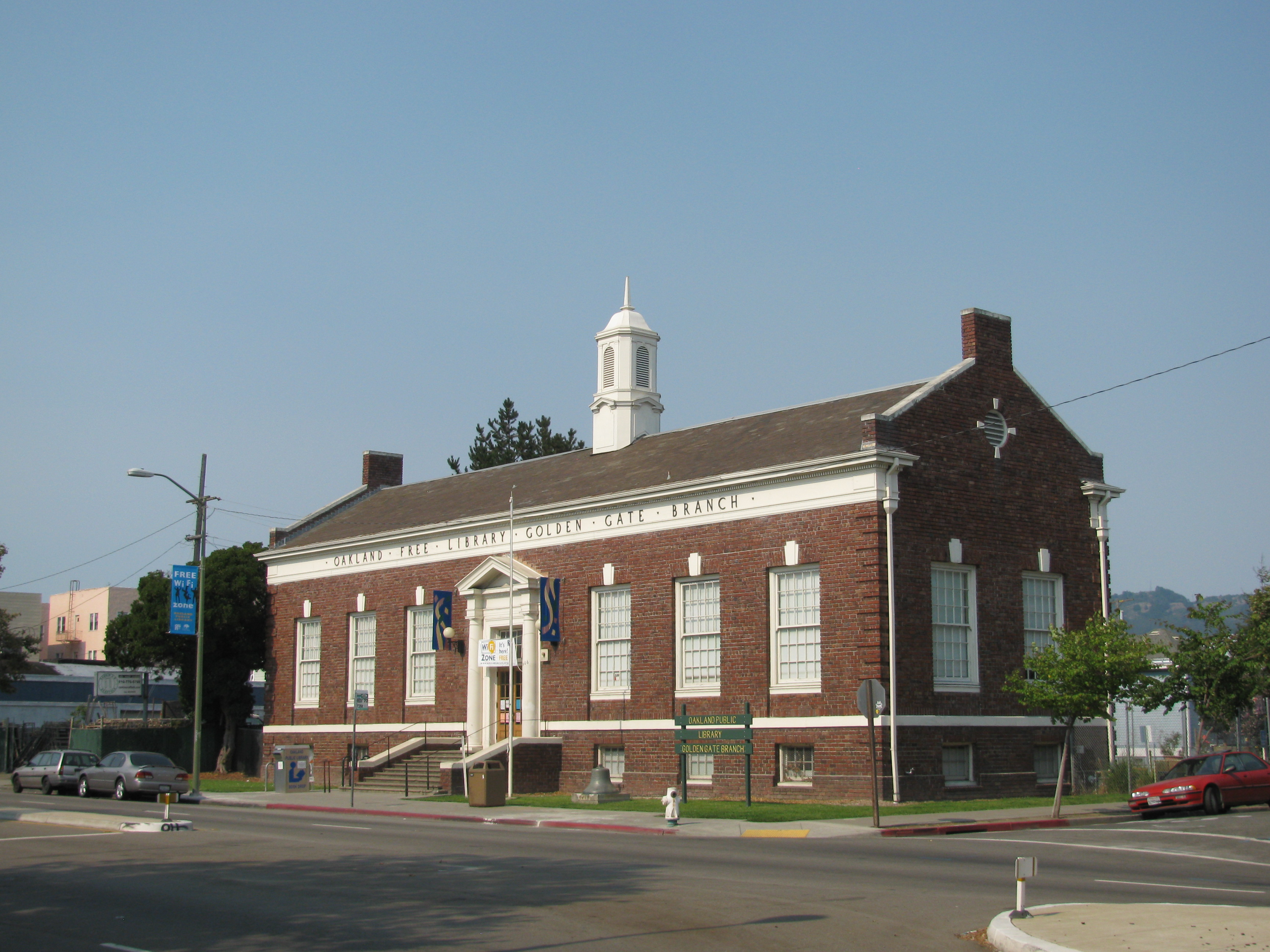
Golden Gate branch of the Oakland Public Library.

The area was inhabited by the Huchiun band of the Ohlone people, then was part of the Rancho San Antonio grant, which was split up following the Treaty of Guadalupe Hidalgo.

Charles Alexander Klinkner built 75 homes in the area and called it Klinknerville, established in 1885. A Klinknerville post office was established in 1887. The name was changed to Golden Gate in 1888. The town was annexed to Oakland in 1897.

The Golden Gate branch of the Oakland Library opened in 1918. It was built with funds from a 1914 Carnegie grant. Its design, by Donovan and Dickie, is a good example of early 20th century Georgian Revival Architecture.

In the first half of the 20th century, Golden Gate was an entertainment district, with over 50 bars including the original Trader Vic's location at the northeast corner of San Pablo Ave & 65th St where the Mai Tai drink was purportedly invented. In the last half of the 20th century the retail district underwent a period of decline and by 1998 was considered blighted by the city of Oakland.

During the Second Great Migration, which got underway at the beginning of World War II, large numbers of African Americans moved to Oakland from Southern states to work in the war production industry. By the 1950s, the Golden Gate area had become majority African American.

In 1982, the East Bay Negro Historical Society (EBNHS) was invited into the Golden Gate Branch of the Oakland Public Library, making it the first Oakland city library with a predominantly African American focused collection. The collection was housed in the entire left side of the library where the children's section of the library is now located. The assistance of Mayor Lionel Wilson, Assemblyman Elihu Harris, and others helped the organization establish a solid foundation in their new home. Following the appointment of Dr. Lawrence Crouchett as its executive director in 1988, the organization changed its name to the Northern California Center for Afro-American History & Life (NCCAAHL). In 1994, the City of Oakland and the NCCAAHL merged to create the African American Museum & Library at Oakland (AAMLO). This unique public/private partnership entered a historic juncture with the opening of AAMLO in February 2002. Located at 659 14th Street, AAMLO is now housed in the former Charles S. Greene library, an historic 1902 Carnegie building.

The Golden Gate Shopping District was the location of Your Black Muslim Bakery, which made national headlines in August 2007 when the bakery was raided by the Oakland police and shut down.

By 2010 the area was undergoing a process of gentrification, including controversially being dubbed "NOBE" (North Oakland Berkeley Emeryville) by some realtors.

Starting in 2014, the neighborhood has hosted Love Our Neighborhood Day, an open streets festival in which San Pablo Avenue is car free.

== Media ==
Oakland North has covered the neighborhood since 2008 and Oakland Local since 2009.
