= Test Pilot =

Test Pilot may refer to:

- Test pilot, pilots who work on developing, evaluating and proving experimental aircraft
- Test Pilot (cocktail), a 1933 tiki drink by Donn Beach
- Test Pilot (film) a 1938 film about test pilots with Clark Gable, Myrna Loy, Spencer Tracy and Lionel Barrymore
