= Navy Grog =

Rum-based tiki drink

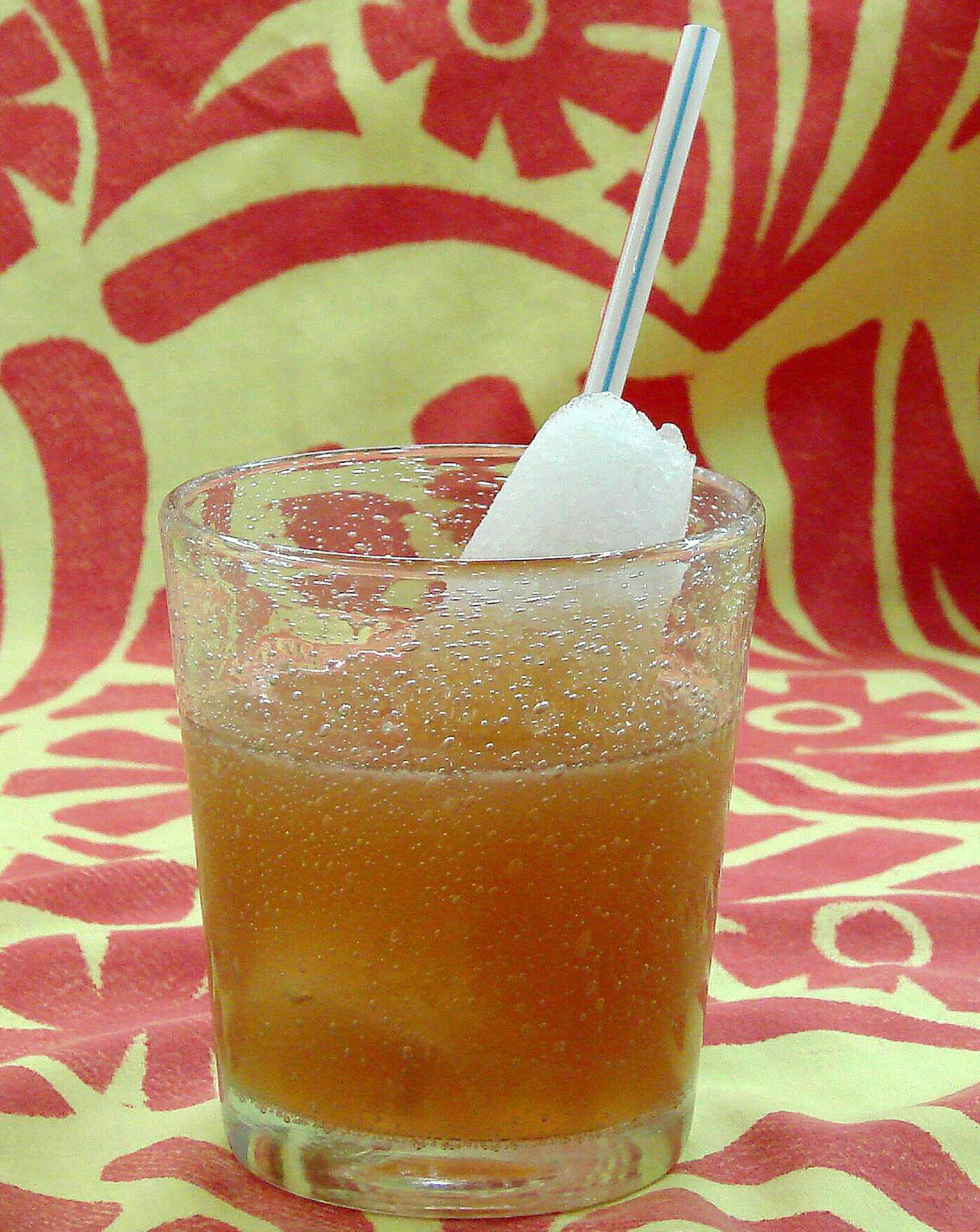
A Navy Grog with a Don the Beachcomber-type snow cone of shaved ice.

The Navy Grog was a popular rum-based drink served for many years at the Polynesian-themed Don the Beachcomber restaurants; it is still served in many tiki restaurants and bars. First created by Donn Beach, who almost single-handedly originated the tiki cultural fad of the 1940s and 1950s, it was one of dozens of rum concoctions that he, and later Trader Vic and numerous other imitators, sold in exotic tropical settings. Not quite as potent as the Beachcomber's more famous Zombie, it was, nevertheless, shown on the menu as being limited to two, or sometimes three, to a customer. Reportedly, Phil Spector consumed at least two Trader Vic’s Navy Grogs at the Beverly Hilton restaurant, without eating any food, the night he later killed actress Lana Clarkson.

== Etymology and origin ==
The word "grog" itself can refer to a variety of alcoholic beverages. It originally referred to a drink made with water and rum, which was introduced into the Royal Navy by British Vice Admiral Edward Vernon on August 21, 1740. Vernon himself had been nicknamed "Old Grog" because of a grogram cloak he wore, and the nickname became attached to the drink. Modern versions of the drink are often made with hot or boiling water, and sometimes include lemon juice, lime juice, cinnamon, or sugar to improve the taste. Rum with water, sugar, and nutmeg was known as Bumboo and was more popular with pirates and merchantmen.

== Recipe ==
=== Original Don the Beachcomber Navy Grog ===
Ingredients:

- 1 ounce (30 mL) gold Demerara rum
- 1 ounce (30 mL) dark Jamaican rum
- 1 ounce white Cuban (or Puerto Rican) rum;
- 3/4 ounce (22 mL) fresh lime juice
- 3/4 ounce (22 mL) white grapefruit juice
- 3/4 ounce (22 mL) club soda
- 1 ounce (30 mL) honey mix (1:1 honey and water)

To make the original Don the Beachcomber Navy Grog, place in a cocktail shaker all the above ingredients, and shake with ice; then strain into a glass with crushed ice (or ice formed into a cone around a straw).

There are several variant recipes, and most of these use fresh lime juice and grapefruit juice along with the rums. Some, though, also add passionfruit juice, while others use guava juice or club soda water instead. Some recipes specify a sweetening agent of honey mixed with unsalted butter, while others use honey mixed with water. Unlike other famous tiki cocktails such as the Zombie or Mai Tai, Navy Grog uses no exotically flavored syrups such as orgeat or falernum.

=== Trader Vic's Navy Grog ===
The Trader Vic’s Navy Grog is significantly different from Don the Beachcomber’s. Although Trader Vic’s Navy Grog Mix is no longer available for purchase (But Hamilton now makes a good Beachbum Barry’s Navy Grog mix), this recipe seems to duplicate it:

Use a Trader Vic’s large Mai Tai glass (available for purchase on their website) and fill it with blender-crushed ice (a few larger pieces keep it colder), up to about a 1/4 inch (6 mm) or less from the top.

In a martini shaker, put

- 1 ounce (30 mL) each of light rum (recommended: Havana Club 3, Caña Brava, Cruzan, Bacardi)
- 1 ounce (30 mL) Demerara or Gold rum (recommended: Hamilton 86 Demerara (best) Appleton, Mount Gay)
- 1 ounce (30 mL) either 151 demerara rum (recommended: Lemon Hart or Hamilton) or dark rum (recommended: Myers’s),
- 1 ounce (30 mL) of freshly squeezed lime juice (or a bit more to taste)
- 1/2 ounce (15 mL) freshly squeezed (ideally white, but red works too) grapefruit juice (substitute more lime juice if you can’t or don’t have fresh grapefruit juice)
- 1 teaspoon (5 mL) (or a bit more to taste) of Allspice Dram (St. Elizabeth).
- Optional: 1 teaspoon (5 mL) of Falernum.
- 2 teaspoon or more of Simple syrup (to taste).

Stir all together and pour over the crushed ice. Add a generous sprig of mint, half of a partially squeezed lime, a rock candy stick, and a straw (Half of a large Starbucks straw works well.) Optional: top with a float of Myers’s Dark Rum or 151 to make an even stronger version.

== Serving ==
Whatever the exact recipe, traditionally the Don the Beachcomber version always been served very cold in a large, broad-based Old Fashioned glass, into which a frozen snow cone of shaved ice has been placed, so that the customer sips the Grog through a straw that runs down through the cone. The Trader Vic’s version omits the snow cone but places the crushed ice in the Trader Vic’s Mai Tai glass, with a half a partially squeezed lime, a large sprig of mint, and a rock candy stick.

== See also ==
- List of cocktails
