= San Pablo Arts District =

Coordinates: 37.838360°N 122.284822°W

The San Pablo Arts District (SPAD) is a nascent arts district along the San Pablo Avenue corridor, between 53rd and 67th Streets in the Golden Gate neighborhood of Oakland, California.

San Pablo Arts District

== Art galleries in the SPAD ==
- Blank Space (2006-2010)
- The Compound Art Studios
- Create In Clay, 5512 San Pablo Ave, Oakland, CA
- Emeryville Art Exhibition, featuring works of nearly ninety artists and craftspeople - both established and emerging - who live or work in Emeryville. The Annual Exhibition is hosted by a different location each year. 2013 will be the 27th edition of the event.
- The Grease Diner, 6604 San Pablo Avenue, Oakland, CA. The Grease Diner provides screen printing services and classes.
- Lottie Rose Art House (Firehouse Collective)
- Mysterious Creatures Art Collective/Cuddle Factory, 6610 San Pablo Ave., Oakland, California. Metal art, jewelry-making and metalwork classes, open studios.
- Sight School
- Yzzo Studios, 6610 San Pablo Avenue, Oakland, CA 94608. Art from recycled metal: steel sculptures. custom window security, furniture.

== Independent cafes exhibiting art in the SPAD ==
- The Actual Cafe
- Bacano Bakery
- Farley's On 65th
- Ruby's Cafe
- Tribu
