= Hilton Toronto =

Hotel in Toronto, Ontario

Coordinates: 43.650006°N 79.385408°W

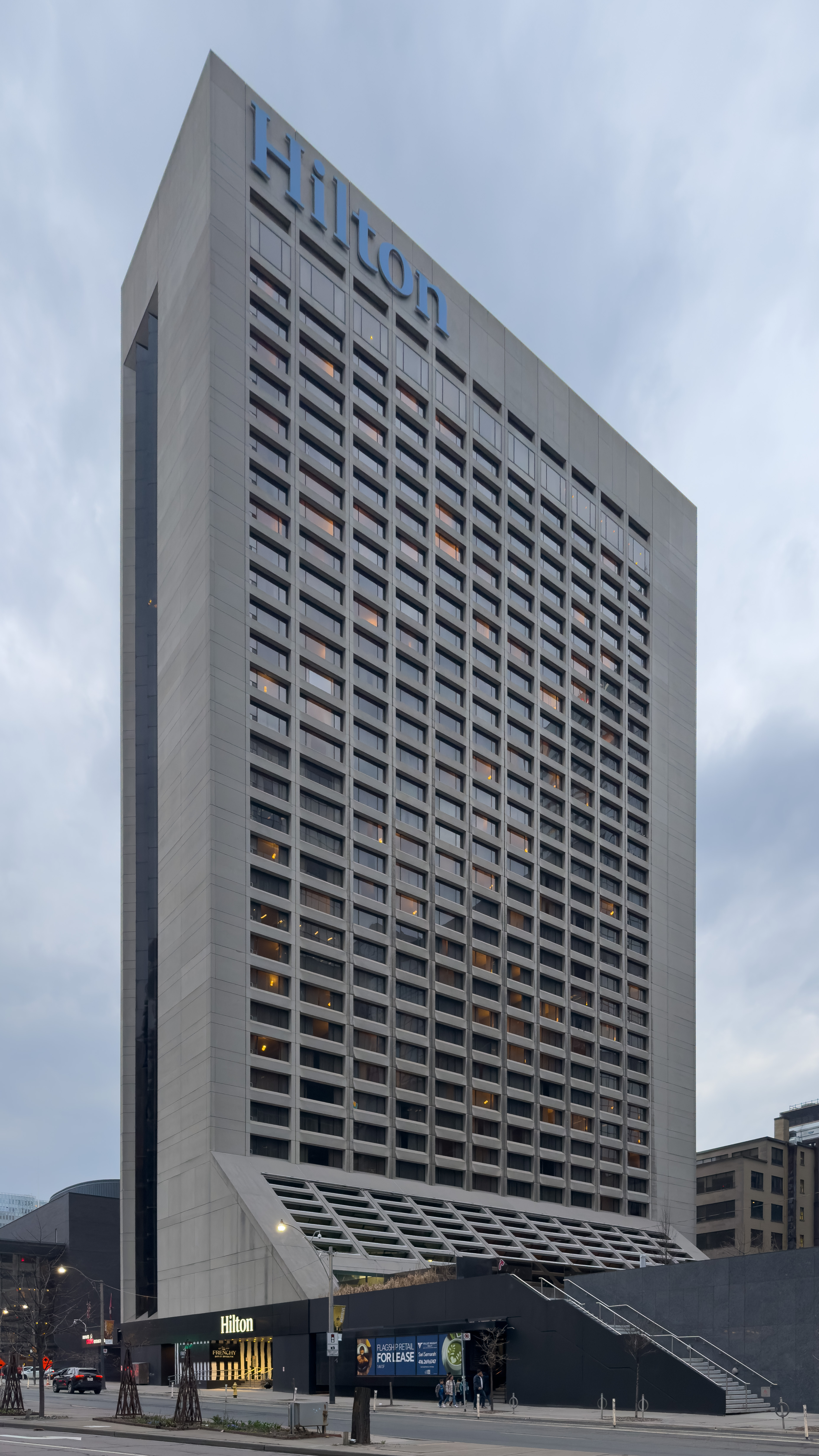
- Former names: Hotel Toronto (1975–1981); Westin Toronto (1981–1987)

General information
- Location: 145 Richmond St. West, Toronto, Ontario
- Opened: 13 June 1975

Technical details
- Floor count: 32 (counted as 33)

Design and construction
- Architects: Reno C. Negrin & Associates; Searle Wilbee Rowland

Other information
- Number of rooms: 600

The Hilton Toronto is a 600-room hotel in Toronto, Ontario operated by Hilton Hotels that has been in operation since 1975. The hotel was built by Western International Hotels (now Westin), which purchased the property in 1970 and began the design process that year. Originally, the site was to have included the hotel and an adjacent office tower. In 1972, Western partnered on the project with Oxford Leaseholds and the design was modified to include a second office tower. Construction began in 1973 and the hotel opened in the summer of 1975. The hotel operated as the Hotel Toronto until 1981, and then as the Westin Hotel Toronto until 1987. That year, as part of a complicated series of corporate ownership changes involving Westin, Hilton, UAL Corporation, and Ladbrokes, the hotel came under Hilton management while remaining under Westin ownership. At an unknown date, Hilton acquired ownership from Westin.

The hotel was designed by Vancouver architect Reno Celestino Negrin (1928–1997), who worked alongside local associates Searle Wilbee Rowland. The Hilton is one of several brutalist luxury hotels built in Toronto in the late 1960s and early 1970s. Others in this group include the Four Seasons Sheraton, Sutton Place, Harbour Castle Hotel, and Hyatt Regency.

== History ==
The history of the Hilton Toronto began in early 1970, when Western International Hotels acquired the property on the eastern side of University Avenue between Richmond and Adelaide. In July of that year, it acquired the adjacent property on the same block along Adelaide. This property was the site of the Toronto Fire Department headquarters building. Western paid the City of Toronto $1,698,049 for the property; the price included $1,000,549 in cash along with the $697,500 purchase of a new property between Adelaide and Nelson just east of Duncan for the fire department. Before it demolished the fire hall, Western removed the lighted map of the city to be used as a decoration in the bar of its new hotel.

After the purchase of the land, Western International partnered with Oxlea Investments Limited, a subsidiary of Oxford Leaseholds Limited of Edmonton. Western contracted the architecture firm Reno C. Negrin & Associates of Vancouver, which had designed its five previous Canadian hotels. Negrin worked with Toronto firm Parkin Architects, Engineers, Planners as its associate architects. In January 1971, the Parkin firm changed its name to Searle Wilbee Rowland. The original proposal for the site included a 30-storey hotel and a 40-storey office tower. Initially, the hotel was to be aligned north–south and to face University Avenue. In July 1970, the Toronto Star published an image of the planned hotel and described a brochure that Western International had released announcing the project.

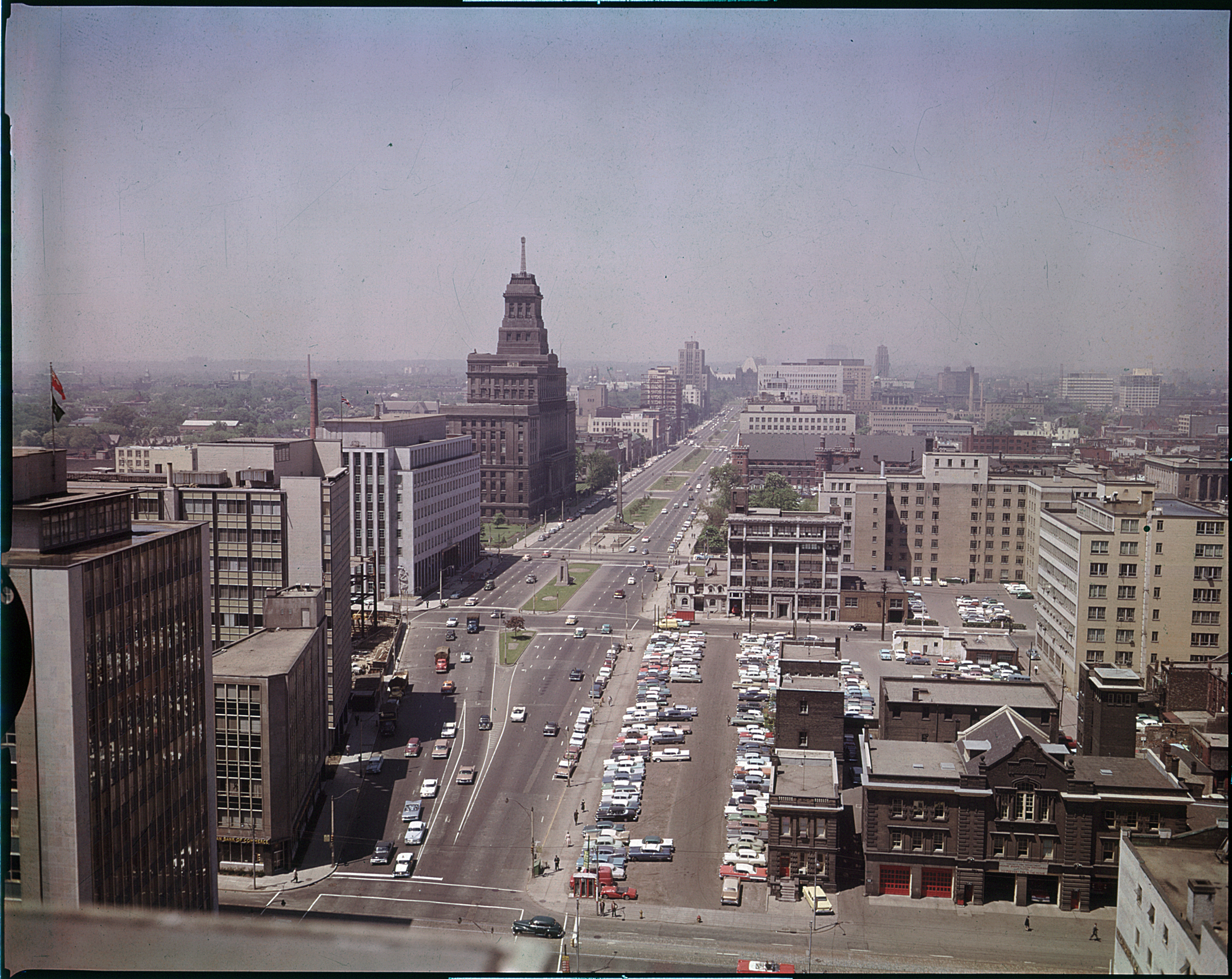
The hotel site in 1959, with the firehall on Adelaide visible at the lower right.

In early 1972, Western International sold the project to Oxford, which would lease the hotel back to Western. By May of that year, Oxford announced that the plans for the project had been amended to include a hotel and two office towers. Western would be responsible for building the hotel, while Oxford would build the offices. The first office tower would be called the Guardian Royal Exchange Tower after Guardian Royal Exchange Assurance, which previously had had offices at 25 Adelaide and would be the new tower's main occupant. The provisional name for the hotel was the Toronto Plaza Hotel. Oxford unveiled the final plans for the project in October 1972. The site would include a 28-storey hotel aligned on the east–west axis would face Richmond, and two office towers would be built on the south side of the property. In April 1973, a photograph of a model of the hotel was published in The Canadian Architect, citing Searle Wilbee Rowland as the architects. In June, the journal corrected itself and said that Negrin was the architect, while SWR were the associates. In July 1973, Western announced the executives for the new hotel, which was slated to open in spring 1975. Michael M. Lambert would be general manager, C. Denis Beaulieu would be director of marketing, and Jean-Pierre Schweizer would be national sales manager. In April 1974, William Tutt replaced Lambert as general manager. Tutt had joined Western International in 1966 and had trained at the Cornell School of Hotel Management.

When it was completed the hotel had three restaurants. These were the Terrace Grill, a Trader Vic's, and the Barristers' Grill. The Barrister's, a law-themed restaurant catered to nearby Osgoode Hall, included menu items such as Plaintiff's Platter and Bailiff's Beef, and was decorated with bookshelves of law books. Negrin's design ended up 32-storeys high, but was counted as 33 due to the superstitious exclusion of the number 13. The top floor had four luxury suites, including the International Suite. Below the hotel was a 450-car garage, and on the terrace was a half-indoor-half-outdoor pool. One of the design highlights was the pair of hexagonal glass elevators that sit outside the building's west wall. Doormen were dressed in Beefeater uniforms.

The hotel opened to the public on Friday, 13 June 1975. The first major event to take place at the Hotel Toronto was the Opera Ball on 18 September, hosted by the women's committee of the Canadian Opera Company. The hotel was to have been one of four to host the United Nations congress on crime, to take place from 27 August to 14 September 1975, and the hotel had reserved 400 of its 600 rooms for attendees. However, the congress was cancelled by the federal government after protests from Jewish organisations over the attendance of observers from the Palestinian Liberation Organization. After the cancellation, the Hotel Association of Metropolitan Toronto appealed directly to prime minister Pierre Trudeau for assistance to compensate for lost business.

After Western International Hotels changed its name to Westin Hotels in January 1981, the Hotel Toronto changed its name to the Westin Hotel Toronto.

In 1970, the UAL Corporation had acquired Western International, and in 1981 the company changed its name to Westin. In the spring of 1987, UAL acquired Hilton additionally. After the purchase of Hilton, the Harbour Castle Hotel – which was privately owned by Copthorne Holdings Limited and had been managed by Hilton – negotiated a new contract to place the hotel under Westin management. In June 1987, only a few months after acquiring it, UAL sold Hilton to Ladbrokes. Since Hilton had lost the contract to manage the Harbour Castle, a condition of the sale to Ladbrokes was that Hilton would get to manage it or the Hotel Toronto. Westin and Ladbrokes struck a deal whereby Hilton would receive a 20-year operating agreement for the Hotel Toronto, which would remain under Westin ownership. At this time, the Hotel Toronto name was removed, and the hotel became the Hilton Toronto.
