= Yorkville Plaza =

Hotel in Toronto

Coordinates: 43.670250°N 79.394327°W

- Hotel chain: Hyatt (1972–1978); Four Seasons (1978–2012)

General information
- Location: 21 Avenue Road, Toronto, Ontario
- Groundbreaking: October 1969
- Opened: 15 March 1972
- Closed: 28 March 2012

Design and construction
- Architecture firm: Webb Zerafa Menkès

Other information
- Number of rooms: 540

Yorkville Plaza is a 31-storey condominium tower and former hotel in Toronto. The hotel was developed by Ian Richard Wookey, who purchased the Yorkville property in 1966 and hired architects Webb Zerafa Menkès to design the building, which was named the Continental Plaza provisionally. Shortly before construction began in the fall of 1969, Wookey sold the project to a partnership of Hyatt and Great West International Equities, the latter of which was taken over in 1971 by Trizec. In the spring of 1972, the hotel opened as the Hyatt Regency.

The hotel was, after York Square, the second building project planned by Wookey in Yorkville and played a major part in his renewal programme for the neighbourhood. Wookey would partner with Webb Zerafa Menkès again in the 1970s to build Cumberland Court and Hazelton Lanes, thus solidifying the architects' role in defining the character of Yorkville. The hotel became a focal point of Toronto society and hosted dignitaries and celebrities frequently. Additionally, the building became one of the city's iconic works of brutalist architecture.

The Hyatt Regency operated from 1972 until 1978, when Four Seasons purchased the management rights. Subsequently, Four Seasons ran the hotel until it closed in 2012. In 2011, the building had been purchased by Camrost-Felcorp, led by developer David Feldman. After the closure, the new owners gutted the hotel and converted it to condominiums. As part of the conversion, new buildings were constructed to the east and south of the hotel in place of the former ballrooms. The new complex of condominiums was named Yorkville Plaza.

== History and design ==
=== Planning and construction ===
The precise origin of the hotel is uncertain. In 1964, an unknown owner planned a redevelopment of the lot that would include an apartment tower at the corner of Avenue and Yorkville and an office tower at the corner of Avenue and Cumberland. At the time, the Yorkville corner was occupied by a gas station, and the Cumberland corner was occupied by an apartment building. The development was featured in the May 1964 issue of The Canadian Architect in an article that profiled a range of projects by Webb Zerafa Menkès. According to a Toronto Star article from 1967, the project was approved by city council in 1964, however, it did not proceed.

In 1966, Ian Richard Wookey (1928–2014) overhead at a cocktail party a discussion about the property. In 1962, Wookey had made a small fortune by acquiring a large block of shares of Canadian Oil Companies before its takeover by Shell Canada. After the windfall, he wanted to leave the brokerage business and enter real estate. Wookey left the party to go look at the property and that night called his lawyer to enquire whether he could purchase it. Within a few days he had bought the Avenue-Cumberland lot, and later he acquired the Avenue-Yorkville lot. Following the purchase, Wookey decided he wanted to revitalise the whole of Yorkville, and proceeded to buy as many properties as he could. His first building project was York Square on the north corner of Avenue and Yorkville, which was designed by Barton Myers and Jack Diamond. It was completed in mid-1968.

After he completed York Square, Wookey set out to build on his first property. Wookey hired architects Webb Zerafa Menkès for the project, who had designed the unbuilt scheme for the site in 1964 and who had designed Lothian Mews in 1963, a shopping plaza in Yorkville. Boris Zerafa (1933–2002) served as lead architect and designed the brutalist hotel. The provisional name of the hotel was the Continental Plaza.

In January 1969, the Star reported that city council was reviewing Wookey's application to rezone the property to allow construction of the hotel. On 24 March 1969, lawyer Edwin A. Goodman represented the architects to sell the project to council. Reporter William Cameron chronicled the presentation and lamented how the new hotel would alter the character of Yorkville, saying, "something is being lost somewhere."

In July 1969, Great West International Equities – the holding company of construction magnate Sam Hashman (1929–2011) of Calgary – formed a partnership with Hyatt International Corp. to open and operate a new chain of Hyatt House hotels across Canada. That month, Great West and Hyatt acquired the Continental Plaza project from Wookey, after which time it became known as the Hyatt House. On 17 September, Hashman was in Toronto to host a reception to celebrate the start of the project. Construction began the following month. In the summer of 1970, the Star ran a full-page article on the hotel boom in Toronto. The article included a drawing of the Hyatt, which it referred to still as the Continental Plaza. In June 1971, Great West International Equities was acquired by Trizec of Montreal. Thus, Trizec became a 50 per cent partner in the hotel.

Project executive was Sada Sato, design associate was Robin Clarke, structural engineers were Read Jones Christoffersen, and mechanical engineers were Rybka Smith & Ginsler. Interior design was done by Arthur P. Fishman, who was Hashman's neighbour in Calgary. Hashman Construction was the contractor.

=== Hyatt years, 1972–1978 ===
The hotel opened on Wednesday, 15 March 1972. The following day, the first event to be held at the hotel took place in the ballroom, where John Carey, a representative of the Irish Export Board, held a reception for Saint Patricks' Day (albeit a day early). The hotel's first manager was Frans Schutzman (1915–2001), who had served as manager of the Raffles Hotel from 1950 to 1959, the Nile Hotel in Cairo from 1960 to 1961, and the Cavalieri Hotel in Rome from 1962 to 1964. Schutzman left the Hyatt in 1974 to become manager of the United Nations Plaza Hotel in New York City.

The new building was one of several brutalist luxury hotels built in Toronto in the 1960s and 1970s. Others in this group included the Four Seasons Sheraton, Sutton Place, and the Hotel Toronto. In a survey of concrete architecture in Toronto, the authors wrote that the hotel was "catalytic to the transformation of Yorkville," and that the "excellent quality concrete finishes and the service of its legendary owner have made the Four Seasons an area landmark for decades." The official opening took place the evening of Saturday, 20 May 1972, when the hotel hosted a black-tie dinner with 450 attendees. The Count Basie Orchestra was brought in from New York to provide the music. Prior to the dinner, Schutzman had hosted several smaller parties to prepare his staff for the grand opening. Among those in attendance were Sue Sandel, the widow of Hyatt president Donald Pritzker; Hyatt executives Peter di Tullio of Chicago and Charles Indermuehle of Vancouver; Toronto mayor William Dennison; council members Horace Brown, Hugh Bruce, Frederick J. Beavis, William Boytchuk, Archibald Chisholm, Arthur Eggleton, Ying Hope, William Kilbourn, June Marks, Allan Austin Lamport, Anthony O'Donohue, Paul B. Pickett, Joseph J. Piccininni, and David Rotenberg; fire chief Charles Chambers; assessment commissioner W. John Hall; director of assessment John Lettner; and commissioner of buildings Lt-Col Ronald H. Milne.

During the 1972 Summit Series, the Soviet contingent stayed at the Hyatt Regency before game two, which was played at Maple Leaf Gardens on 4 September. On 29 August, Globe and Mail sports writer Dick Beddoes had written, "if the Russians win one game, I will eat this column shredded at high noon in a bowl of borscht on the front steps of the Russian embassy." Following Canada's 3-7 loss to the Soviets in Montreal in game one the day before, on 3 September Beddoes and Tibor Kolley gathered a crowd outside the Hyatt Regency where Pravda reporter Konstantin Gueivandov shredded the column into a bowl of borscht that Beddoes ate. Gathered around Beddoes were Vladimir Vikulov, Aleksandr Gusev, and Alexander Sidelnikov.

Also in 1972, Wookey partnered with Webb Zerafa Menkès to build Cumberland Court (99 Yorkville Avenue), which became the architects' head office and that year won a Canadian Architect award of excellence.

In February 1973, The Canadian Architect published a lengthy feature on the Hyatt Regency. The feature included a critique by Peter Prangnell (1930–2023), the chairman of the faculty of architecture at the University of Toronto. Professor Prangnell delievered a scathing critique of the hotel, describing it as commercial architecture designed to control. Prangnell compared the Hyatt unfavourably to the neighbouring Park Plaza, which he considered a superior work. In April, Zerafa wrote a pointed response, telling Prangnell, "don't use the outmoded critical words that are unrelated to today's reality, and enjoy your drink the Park Plaza, circa 1937." The following month, Prangnell delivered a retort, saying, "as for your 'enjoy your drink in the Park Plaza, circa 1937,' I will, just as I would advise Mr Zerafa to beware zinging any building because it is 1937, 1837, or 437 BC, provided that it has pleased human beings as a real, authentic, original place, regardless of its date."

In 1975, Trizec sold its 75 per cent ownership stake in the hotel to Bramalea Ltd. of Toronto, which was owned and operated by J. Richard Shiff.

=== Four Seasons years, 1978–2012 ===
In 1973, Wookey teamed up once more with Webb Zerafa Menkès to design Hazelton Lanes, a residential complex directly north of York Square. To finance the project, Wookey brought in Gérard Louis-Dreyfus as a partner. The project led Louis-Dreyfus to acquire the parking lot north of Hazelton Lanes, and in 1977 he partnered with Four Seasons Hotels to plan a hotel there designed by Webb Zerafa Menkès. In 1976, Four Seasons had sold its share in the Four Seasons Sheraton and sought a new flagship hotel in Toronto. The project collapsed after Four Seasons president Isadore Sharp fell out with Louis-Dreyfus. In lieu of building, in December 1977 Sharp approached the Hyatt-Bramalea group to propose a purchase of the management rights of the Hyatt Regency.

In April 1978, Four Seasons announced that it had purchased the management and leasing of the hotel. As part of the deal, Four Seasons obtained an option to acquire a 25 per cent share in the hotel. At the time, the building was 75 per cent owned by Bramalea and 25 per cent by Hyatt. The lease Four Seasons obtained was for 99 years. On 1 May 1978, the hotel came under Four Seasons management officially. During the first week under the new management, all guests received a 21-ounce bottle of Henkell Trocken champagne. After the change in ownership, Sharp renovated the hotel and decreased the room count from 540 to 380.

In 1995, Bramalea went bankrupt and was forced to sell its share in the hotel.

=== Closure and conversion to residences, 2012–present ===
In August 2011, the Star reported that the Four Seasons had been sold and that it would close in March 2012. The closure would coincide with the completion of the new Four Seasons Hotel and Residences at Bay and Yorkville, which would open in August 2012. The new owner of the old hotel was Camrost-Felcorp Inc., which was led by president David Feldman. Previously, Camrost-Felcorp had completed the conversion of the Imperial Oil Building to residences. Feldman hired WZMH to design a conversion of the hotel to private residences.

In late May and early June 2012, the owners auctioned off around 15,000 items from the old hotel, valued at around $10 million. Work began that year on the conversion of the hotel to residences. As part of the project, the ballroom wing along Avenue was demolished, and a new 40-storey tower was built in its place, called the Cumberland Tower. Additionally, another 11-storey wing was constructed on Yorkville Avenue to the east of the hotel.
