= Orgeat syrup =

Sweet syrup

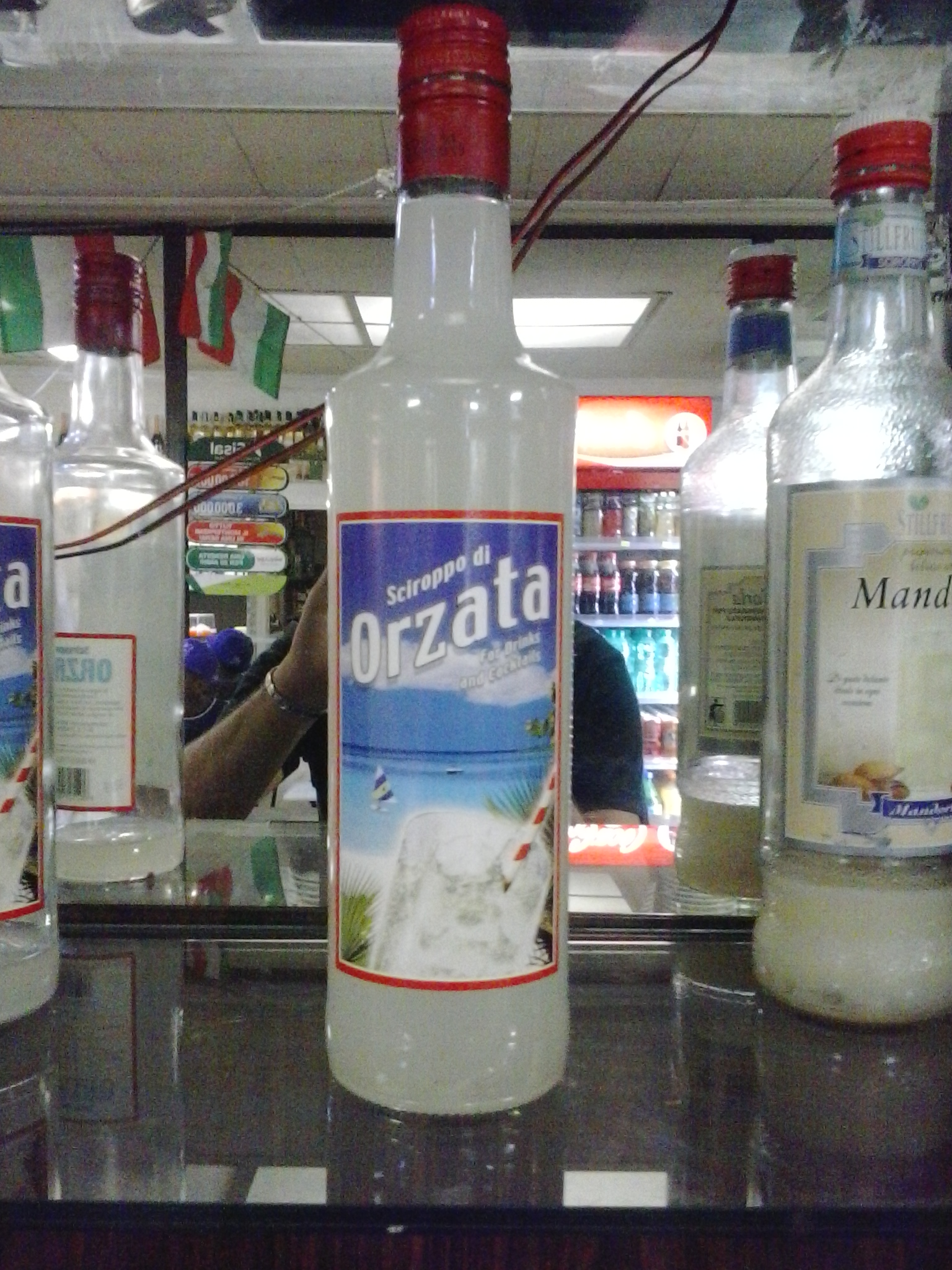
- A bottle of Italian orgeat syrup
- Type: Syrup
- Flavour: Almond
- Ingredients: Almonds, sugar, and rose water or orange flower water
- Variants: Horchata
- Related products: Falernum

Orgeat syrup is a sweet syrup made from almonds and sugar with a little rose water and/or orange flower water. It was originally made with a barley-almond blend. It has a pronounced almond taste and is used to flavor many cocktails. Orgeat syrup is an important ingredient in the Mai Tai and many Tiki drinks.

== History ==
An early recipe for orgeat can be found in The English and Australian Cookery Book:

Take a pound and a quarter of bitter almonds, and half a pound of sweet almonds, which have been blanched, nine pounds of loaf sugar, six pints of water, and the rinds of three lemons. Pound the almonds in a mortar with the sugar, and add the water a little by degrees; then put the mixture on the fire with the lemon-peel. After a boil pour off the syrup and press the almonds, to extract the milk; add this to the syrup, and strain the whole through a sieve. When cold add a little orange flower water, and bottle the mixture. The orgeat is used as a summer drink, mixed with water, according to taste.

Bitter almonds as a general rule contain cyanide and can be lethal in large quantities. For this reason modern syrups generally are produced only from sweet almonds. Such syrup products do not contain significant levels of hydrocyanic acid, so are generally considered safe for human consumption.

== Word origin ==
The word orgeat (/ɔːrˈʒɑː, ˈɔːrdʒiət, ˈɔːrʒɒt/) is derived from the Latin hordeaceus 'made with barley' through the French, where barley is called orge. The Catalan word orxata, from which derives the Spanish horchata, has the same origin, though today the two drinks have little else in common and neither of them uses barley.

== Regional uses ==
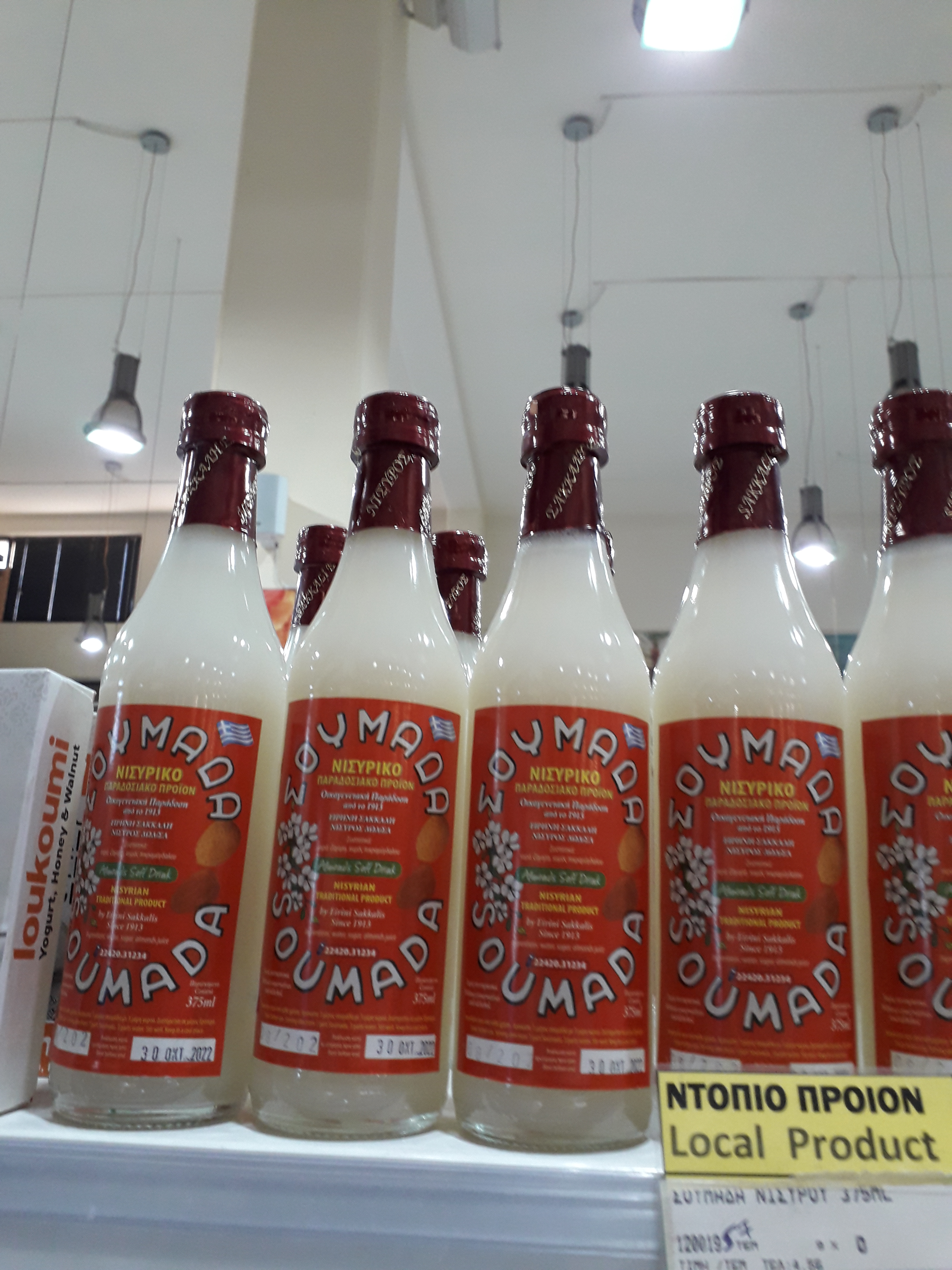
Soumada bottles

In Tunisia and Libya, a variant is called rozata and is usually served chilled in wedding and engagement parties as a symbol of joy and purity because of its white colour and its fresh (flowery) flavor. It comes in many different flavours, such as traditional almond, banana, mango, pistachio, among others.

In Suriname, there is a drink called orgeade, which is a similar syrup made of sugar and sweet and bitter almonds.

Maltese ruġġata is made of almond and vanilla essence and may include cinnamon and cloves.

In Cyprus and on the Greek islands of Chios and Nisyros, a similar syrup is known as soumádha (Greek: σουμάδα). Soumada has a very ancient history at least in Cyprus, stretching back into the Roman period, and it was given as an exotic delicacy by King Peter I of Cyprus to King Casimir the Great of Poland at the Congress of Kraków, held in Poland in 1364.

== See also ==
- Orxata, a Valencian drink with a related name
- Falernum syrup
- Fassionola syrup
- Drink mixers
- List of syrups
- Tiki drinks
