= Q.B. Cooler =

Type of cocktail

The Q.B. Cooler is a vintage tiki cocktail invented by Donn Beach that calls for a mixture of several rums (Puerto Rican dark rum, Jamaican rum, Demerara 151 proof rum), two syrups (fassionola, falernum), fruit juices (orange, lime), and honey, mixed with club soda and dashes of Pernod, bitters, and grenadine. Another version purported to be from 1937 is slightly different and calls for varying rum proportions and ginger syrup in place of the fassionola and Pernod.

== History ==
Beach created the Q.B. Cooler for his Don the Beachcomber restaurants, which he limited to two per customer. An aviation themed drink similar to Beach's Test Pilot, Beach had served in the US Army Air Corp. during World War II. The "Q.B." stood for Quiet Birdmen, or more fully "ye Anciente and Secret Order of Quiet Birdmen", a fraternity of male aviators dating back to the first world war.

== Mai Tai connection ==
Beach is generally acknowledged as the father of the "Tiki bar", and his obituary in the New York Times alleged he had invented 84 bar drinks, but the Mai Tai cocktail was claimed to be originally created by both Beach and Victor Bergeron (aka, Trader Vic). Although Trader Vic's won an out of court settlement as to the naming rights for cocktail, the drink's true origin continues to be debated. According to Mick Brownlee, who worked with Donn for over 10 years, the drink Bergeron named the Mai Tai was created in his efforts to try to emulate the flavor of a Q.B. Cooler.
