= Test pilot (cocktail) =

Type of cocktail

The test pilot cocktail is a vintage tiki drink invented by Donn Beach. Beach was known for changing his recipes over time, and multiple versions of the test pilot attributed to both him and others make the cocktail one of his more frequently imitated and varied tiki drinks. Test pilot recipes call for multiple rums and typically include the use of falernum syrup and lime juice. The more popular also include Pernod (pastis/absinthe) and bitters.

== Test pilot versions ==
A recipe from a Don the Beachcomber drink guide calls for 1 oz of Lemon Hart Demerara 151 proof rum and 3/4 oz each of Jamaican dark rum, Puerto Rican dark rum, lime juice, grape juice, and honey. Two dashes each of bitters and grenadine should also be added, then flash blended with cracked ice and served in a double old fashioned glass. The date of the recipe's origin and when and where it was served is not mentioned.

Another version that Jeff Berry attributes to Donn Beach from circa 1941 while less strong is still very potent and calls for 1 1/2 oz of Jamaican dark rum, 3/4 oz of Puerto Rican light rum, 3 teaspoons of Cointreau, 1/8 a teaspoon of Pernod, a 1/2 oz of both lime juice and falernum syrup, and a dash of bitters. The use of Pernod and bitters was employed by Beach as one of his signature combinations, and some cocktail enthusiasts feel it is a pivotal part of the recipe. Several additional cocktail recipe references choose to highlight this version.

A Trader Vic test pilot version listed in his 1972 revised drink guide switches the lime juice for lemon and jettisons the Pernod and bitters, calling only for 1 3/4 oz dark Jamaican rum, 3/4 oz light Puerto Rican rum, 1/4 oz of Cointreau, 1/4 oz falernum, and 1/4 oz lemon juice. Difford's Guide chose to highlight the Trader Vic's version.

== The Jet Pilot ==
Some Beachcomber and Trader Vic competitors named their versions as the Jet Pilot, including at The Luau restaurant and the Mai-Kai. The Jet Pilot was similar to Beach's 1941 version but was slightly spicier with the addition of stronger rum, grapefruit juice, and cinnamon syrup.

== Impact on tiki culture ==
Beyond the Jet Pilot, other aviation themed tiki cocktails include the similarly named Ace Pilot, Don Beach's Q.B. Cooler, and Trader Vic's PB2Y (named after the Navy's Coronado plane).

A tiki bar named Test Pilot operates in Santa Barbara, California, that serves a test pilot cocktail, described as having a flavor profile of "house rum blend, clove, citrus, bitters, [and] absinthe foam".
