= Mai Tai =

Cocktail based on rum, Curaçao liqueur and lime juice

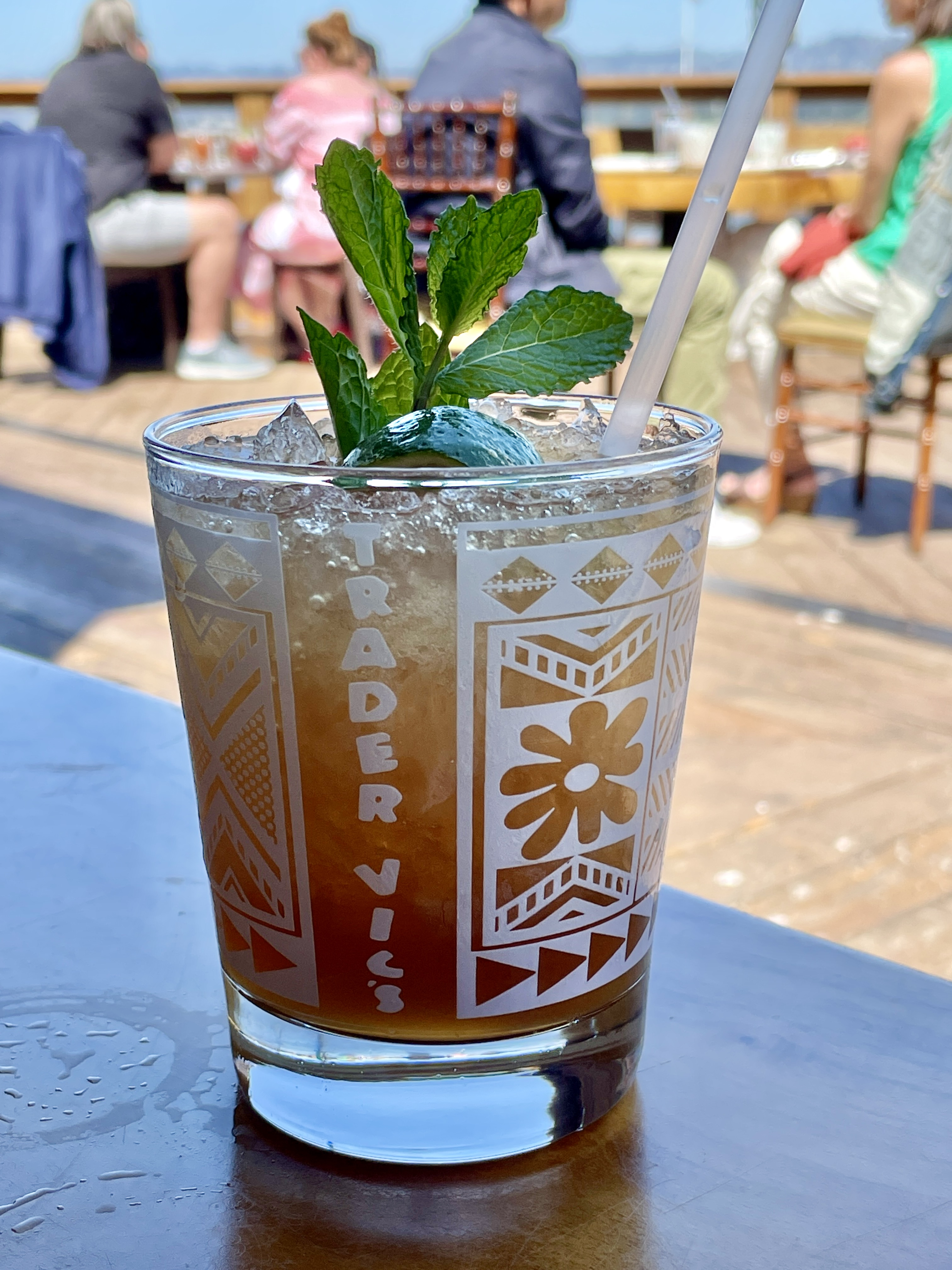
- Type: Cocktail
- Ingredients: 30 ml amber Jamaican rum; 30 ml Martinique molasses rhum; 15 ml orange curaçao; 15 ml orgeat syrup (almond); 30 ml fresh lime juice; 7.5 ml simple syrup
- Base spirit: Rum
- Website: iba-world.com/mai-tai/
- Standard drinkware: Double old fashioned glass
- Standard garnish: pineapple spear, mint leaves, and lime peel
- Served: shaved or crushed ice
- Preparation: Add all ingredients into a shaker with ice. Shake and pour into a double rocks glass or a highball glass.

The Mai Tai (/ˈmaɪ ˈtaɪ/ MYE TYE) is a cocktail made of rum, Curaçao liqueur, orgeat syrup, and lime juice. It is one of the characteristic cocktails in Tiki culture.

== History ==
Victor J. Bergeron claimed to have invented the Mai Tai in 1944 at his restaurant, Trader Vic's, in Oakland, California, US. Trader Vic's forerunner, Donn Beach, claimed to have instead first created it in 1933, although a longtime colleague said that Beach was actually just alleging that the Mai Tai was based on his Q.B. Cooler cocktail. Don the Beachcomber's recipe is more complex than Vic's and some believe it tastes quite different. Others believe that, despite the difference in ingredients, the Q.B. Cooler tastes quite similar.

The Mai Tai was introduced in Hawaii in 1953 when Bergeron created a cocktail menu for the Matson Company hotels the Royal Hawaiian Hotel and Moana Hotel. The cocktail became a hit and was called the "top tourist tantalizer" in 1959. In the years thereafter, pineapple juice, orange juice, and a dark rum float became commonly used in Mai Tais produced in Hawaii.

The name was allegedly taken from maitaʻi, the Tahitian word for "good" or "excellence", although the drink is usually spelled as two words, sometimes hyphenated or capitalized.

== Recipe ==
Most current recipes for Mai Tais based on Trader Vic's 1944 recipe include rum, lime juice, orgeat syrup, and orange liqueur (typically orange curaçao). Variants may include the addition of amaretto, falernum, bitters, grenadine, orange, pineapple and grapefruit juices, and so on. This wide variance in ingredients used exists because Trader Vic's kept the recipe unpublished for nearly 30 years, forcing some competitors to guess at the ingredients to satisfy customers, though various recipes published in newspapers in the 1950s and 1960s did include key ingredients such as orgeat, orange curaçao, and rock candy syrup.

Various books from Victor Bergeron described using rum from Jamaica as well as from Martinique, which in modern usage is a rhum agricole, being a rum made from sugarcane juice rather than molasses. As noted in Smuggler's Cove by Martin Cate and Rebecca Cate, the Martinique rums used by Bergeron in the 1950s were most certainly not agricole rums. Overproof rums are sometimes added to make stronger versions, but Cate says references to such use as being from "the old way" was only because a 151 proof (75%) demerara float was the preferred variation of a frequent elderly customer.

== Culture ==
- The Mai Tai became a popular cocktail in the 1950s and 1960s and many restaurants, particularly tiki-themed restaurants or bars, served them.
- The drink was also prominently featured in the 1961 Elvis Presley film Blue Hawaii.
- The Mai Tai was named the official cocktail of the city by the Oakland, California city council.
