= Trader Vic's =

Polynesian-themed American restaurant chain

Coordinates: 37.8380°N 122.3078°W

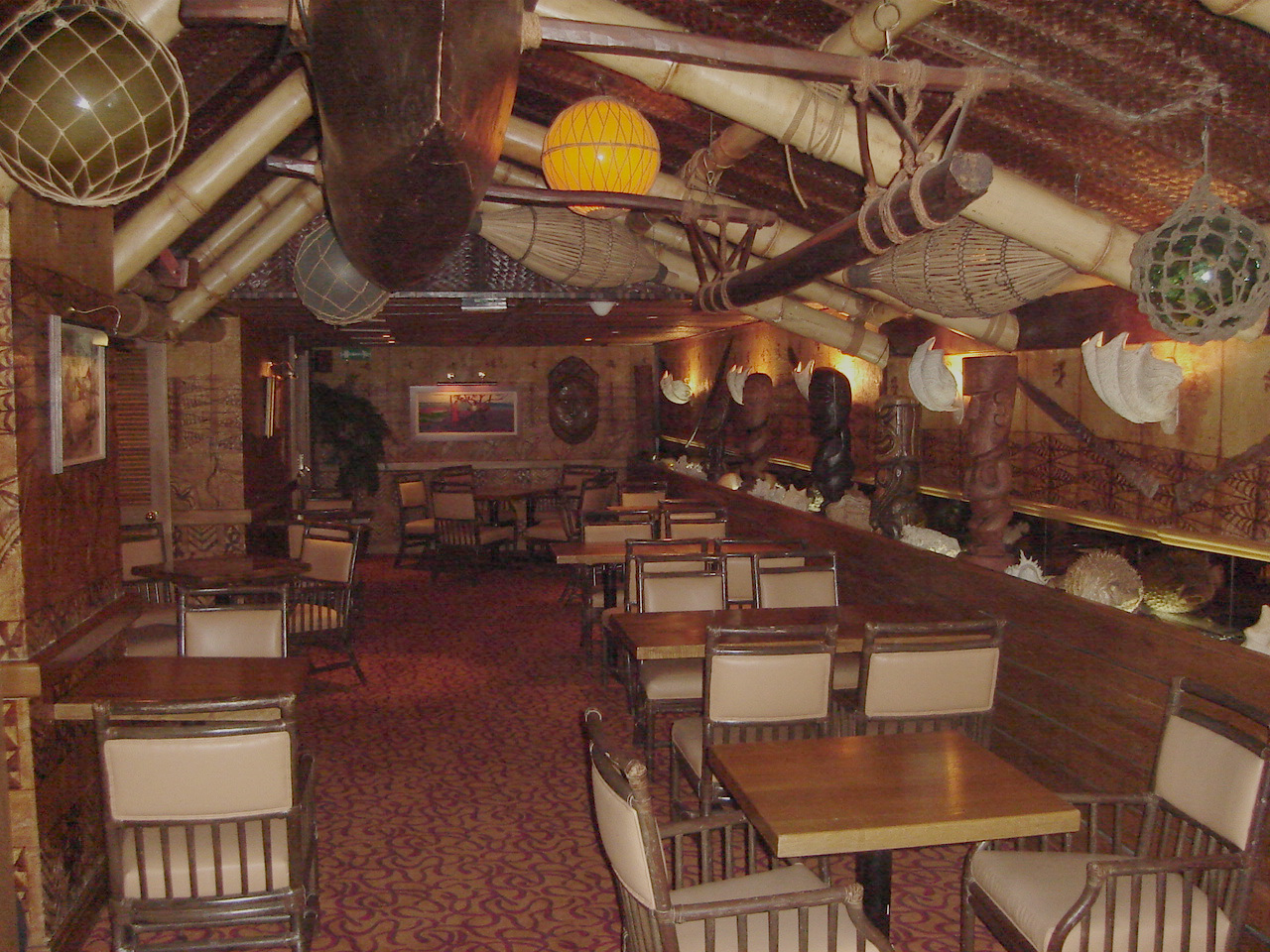
- Trader Vic's, London
- Type: Private
- Industry: Restaurant
- Founded: November 17, 1934; 91 years ago as Hinky Dink's
- Founder: Victor Jules Bergeron, Jr
- Headquarters: Emeryville, California, United States
- Area served: United States; United Arab Emirates; United Kingdom
- Products: Mai Tai
- Website: tradervics.com

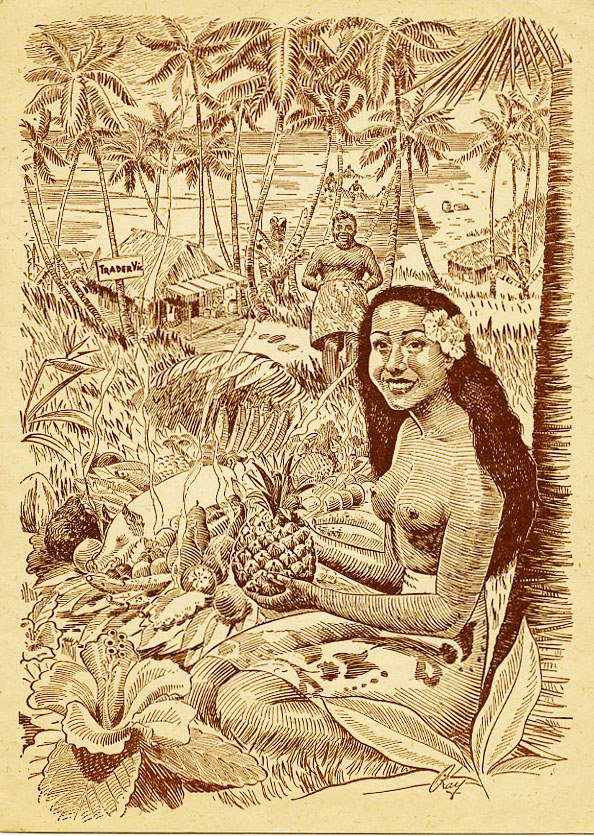
Old menu cover, original Trader Vic's, Oakland

Trader Vic's is a restaurant and tiki bar chain headquartered in Martinez, California, United States. Victor Jules Bergeron, Jr. founded a chain of Polynesian-themed restaurants that bore his nickname, "Trader Vic". He was one of two people who claimed to have invented the Mai Tai. The other was his amicable competitor for many years, Donn Beach of the "Don the Beachcomber" restaurants.

== History ==
Bergeron attended Heald College in San Francisco. On November 17, 1934, using $500 in borrowed money, Bergeron opened a small bar/restaurant across from his uncle's bar at San Pablo Avenue and 65th Street in the Golden Gate District of Oakland. He named it Hinky Dink's. In 1937, Bergeron made a trip to Cuba to expand his bartender skills. When he returned to the United States, he toured Don the Beachcomber in Hollywood. These two trips inspired him to start decorating the bar with an increasingly tropical flair. To match the bar's new tiki theming, Bergeron changed the name from Hinky Dink's to Trader Vic's. In 1940, Bergeron opened a Trader Vic's location in Hawaii.

In 1949, Western Hotels executive Edward Carlson convinced Bergeron to open his first franchised location in the Benjamin Franklin Hotel in Seattle. Originally a small bar named The Outrigger, it was expanded into a full restaurant in 1954 and renamed Trader Vic's in 1960. Due to the restaurant's success, Bergeron worked with Western Hotels to open Trader Vic's locations in a number of their hotels. In 1951, Bergeron opened a Trader Vic's location at 20 Cosmo Place in San Francisco.

Because Bergeron lacked the capital to expand, he partnered with Hilton Hotels. Conrad Hilton opened his first Trader Vic's in The Beverly Hilton in 1955. Two years later, Hilton opened another Trader Vic's in The Palmer House in Chicago, and then licensed the Trader Vic's brand for use throughout his chain for $2,000,000, retaining Bergeron to oversee the decoration, staffing and operation of the restaurants for an annual salary of $65,000. Hilton soon estimated the popular Trader Vic's establishments were earning his hotel chain $5 million a year. Sheraton Hotels quickly opened competing chains of tiki restaurants in their hotels, known as Ports O' Call and Kon-Tiki.

During the Tiki culture fad of the 1950s and 1960s, as many as 25 Trader Vic's restaurants were in operation worldwide. They all featured the popular mix of Polynesian artifacts, unique cocktails, and exotic cuisine. The chain of restaurants grew and is credited as one of the first successful themed chains, a marketing model that many other restaurants followed.

In 1972 the original location in Oakland was closed and replaced by a bayfront restaurant in nearby Emeryville, now considered the chain's flagship restaurant. In the 1980s and 1990s, the chain began to shrink as the tiki theme carried little resonance with a younger generation. Poor locations or less trendy addresses took a further toll on the chain's popularity. While many of the original locations have closed, Trader Vic's once again grew to 18 locations around the globe as of July 2018.

As of 2024, there are three Trader Vic's restaurants in the United States, one in Europe, ten in the Middle East, two in Asia, and one in Africa.

The Trader Vic's Corporation has also franchised restaurants and bars under the names the Mai Tai Lounge (all locations defunct), Trader Vic's Island Bar & Grill (opened 2010 in Sarasota, Florida, shuttered in 2013 – where the company experimented with a Margaritaville-like concept), and Señor Pico. There is one remaining Señor Pico location at The Palm Dubai.

== Drinks ==
According to the Trader Vic's website, the Mai-Tai was invented by Bergeron in 1944 in Oakland, California.

Beyond the Mai Tai, Bergeron's other more famous drinks included the Fog Cutter and the Scorpion Bowl. Both drinks were served in a specific and highly decorated mug or bowl. His take on a Hot buttered rum was also an early example calling for a specific ceramic mug, in this case a skull. The Scorpion Bowl in particular and its many variations proliferated onto the cocktail menus of virtually all subsequent Tiki bars. The menus from his restaurants could list dozens of different tropical drinks. As was the case with Don the Beachcomber, rum was the hallmark ingredient in most of his cocktails, but Vic is also credited with creating the Eastern Sour, which employed less common (for Tiki drinks) rye whiskey, and another drink using even more rarely used tequila (the Mexican El Diablo).

== Headquarters ==
The company is headquartered in Martinez, California.

At times the company had its headquarters in several locations in the San Francisco Bay Area, including Emeryville, California, Corte Madera and San Rafael.

== Current locations ==
Country	State/Province	City	Year opened	Notes
Germany	Bavaria	Munich	1971	Located in the Hotel Bayerischer Hof
United States	California	Emeryville	1972	Flagship restaurant location
Japan	Tokyo	Tokyo	1974	Located in the Hotel New Otani Tokyo
United States	Georgia	Atlanta	1976	Located in the Hilton Atlanta
Thailand		Bangkok	1992	Located in the Anantara Riverside Bangkok Resort, formerly Marriott Royal Gardens Riverside
United Arab Emirates	Emirate of Abu Dhabi	Abu Dhabi	1994	Located in the Beach Rotana Abu Dhabi
United Arab Emirates	Abu Dhabi	Al Ain	1999	Located in the Al Ain Rotana Hotel
Bahrain	Capital Governorate	Manama	2000	Located in The Ritz-Carlton Bahrain, formerly Le Royal Meridien Bahrain
Oman	Muscat Governorate	Muscat	2000	Located in the InterContinental Muscat in Shati Al-Qurm
United Arab Emirates	Dubai	Dubai	2004	Located in Souk Madinat Jumeirah
Jordan	Amman	Amman	2007	Located in the Regency Palace Hotel
Qatar	Ad Dawhah	Doha	2012	Located in the Hilton Doha in West Bay
Seychelles	Mahe Island	Beau Vallon	2017	Located in the H Resort
United Arab Emirates	Dubai	Dubai	2018	Located in the Hilton Dubai Jumeirah
United States	California	San Jose	2021	Trader Vic's Outpost – Located in San Jose International Airport
United Arab Emirates	Dubai	Palm Jumeirah	2022	Located in the Hilton Dubai Palm Jumeirah

== Former locations ==
Country	State/Province	City	Year opened	Year closed	Notes
United States	California	Oakland	1934	1972	The original Trader Vic's restaurant, originally known as "Hinky Dink's"; closed and relocated to Emeryville, California, in November 1972
United States	Washington	Seattle	1948	1969	Originally opened under the name "The Outrigger", located in the Benjamin Franklin Hotel. Name changed to Trader Vic's in 1960. Moved to the adjoining Washington Plaza Hotel when it opened in 1969
United States	California	San Francisco	1951	1994	20 Cosmo Place
United States	Colorado	Denver	1954	1978	Originally opened under the name "The Outrigger", located in Hotel Cosmopolitan at 18th and Broadway. Name changed to Trader Vic's in 1962. Closed in 1978 when Trader Vic's opened a different location at the Denver Hilton.
United States	California	Beverly Hills	1955	2007	Located in The Beverly Hilton; closed in April 2007 when that wing of the hotel was demolished to construct the Waldorf Astoria Beverly Hills. A Trader Vic's Lounge poolside bar was then opened at the Beverly Hilton, offering some of the signature drinks and limited food options, but this too closed, in 2017.
United States	Illinois	Chicago	1957	2005	Located in The Palmer House Hilton; closed on New Year's Eve in December 2005 as a result of the hotel's acquisition by Thor Equities
United States	New York	New York	1958	1965	Located in the Savoy Hilton and opened in April 1958. It closed in 1965 when the hotel was demolished to make room for construction of the General Motors Building.
Cuba	Havana	Havana	1958	1960	Located in the Habana Hilton. Opened just before Castro took power in Cuba in 1959. After the hotel was nationalized in 1960 and renamed the Habana Libre, the restaurant was renamed Polinesio, and still operates today with the original tiki theme and much of the original Trader Vic's decor.
United States	Oregon	Portland	1959	1996	Located in the Benson Hotel
United States	District of Columbia	Washington	1961	1995	Located in the Statler Hilton A temporary pop-up location reopened in the hotel's bar in the summer of 2022, from Memorial Day to Labor Day.
Canada	British Columbia	Vancouver	1961	1996	Located in The Bayshore Inn, later known as The Westin Bayshore
United States	Puerto Rico	San Juan	1961	Circa 1965	Located in the Caribe Hilton
United States	Arizona	Scottsdale	1962	1990	Located in the Fifth Avenue shopping district
United Kingdom	England	London	1963	2022	Located in the Hilton Park Lane
United States	Michigan	Detroit	1963	1975	Located in the Statler Hilton. Opened in 1963. Closed in 1975 along with the rest of the hotel after Detroit Edison ended utility service.
United States	Massachusetts	Boston	1965	1976	Located in the Statler Hilton; closed in December 1976 when Hilton sold the hotel. This location is now a McCormick & Schmick's.
United States	New York	New York	1965	1989	Located in the basement of the Plaza Hotel and opened in 1965 following the closure of the previous location at the Savoy-Plaza Hotel. It contained an outrigger canoe used in the film Mutiny on the Bounty. It closed in 1989 after Donald Trump purchased the Plaza Hotel, since Trump considered Trader Vic's to be tacky and inconsistent with his vision for the hotel. It opened virtually unchanged six months later as "Gaugin's" and was most recently the location of the Todd English Food Hall.
United States	Texas	Houston	1965	1986	Located in the Shamrock Hilton
United States	Texas	Dallas	1967	1989	Located in the Hilton Inn off North Central Expressway and Mockingbird Lane; opened in March 1967; closed in 1989
United States	Missouri	St. Louis	1968	1985	Located in the Bel Air Hilton at 4th and Washington
United States	Washington	Seattle	1969	1991	Moved from the adjoining Benjamin Franklin Hotel to the new Washington Plaza Hotel, later the Westin Seattle; closed June 1991
United States	Florida	St. Petersburg	1971	1973	Located in the Sheraton-Bel Air
United States	Missouri	Kansas City	1973	1996	Located in the Crown Center Hotel, later The Westin Hotel; closed in 1996 when its lease was not renewed by the hotel
Canada	Ontario	Toronto	1975	1991	Located in the basement of the Hotel Toronto, now the Hilton Toronto. Now occupied by a Ruth's Chris Steak House.
United States	Colorado	Denver	1978	1985	Opened in the Denver Hilton in 1978 after the previous Denver location at the Hotel Cosmopolitan closed
Singapore	Singapore		1984	2003	Located in the New Otani Hotel
Japan		Osaka	1986	2006	Opened in September 1986 in the Hotel New Otani Osaka. Closed in June 2006.
Germany	North Rhine-Westphalia	Düsseldorf	1987	1999	Located in the Hotel Breidenbacher Hof. Closed in 1999, along with the hotel, was eventually torn down and rebuilt. The hotel reopened in 2008, without Trader Vic's.
Germany	Hamburg	Hamburg	1991	2013	Located at the Radisson SAS Hotel
Taiwan	New Taipei City	Taipei	1993	2010	
Spain	Málaga	Marbella	1997	2009	
Japan	Fukuoka Prefecture	Fukuoka	1999	2003	
Lebanon	Beirut Governorate	Beirut	2000	2006	Located in the Gefinor Rotana Hotel
Egypt	Cairo Governorate	Cairo	2000	2006	Located in the Sheraton Royal Gardens Hotel
United States	California	Palo Alto	2001	2012	Located in Dinah's Garden Hotel. When it opened in 2001, it was the first new Trader Vic's location in the United States in 28 years. Closed in August 2012
Germany	Berlin	Berlin	2003	2009	Located in the Hilton Berlin; opened in April 2003; closed March 2009
United States	California	San Francisco	2004	2007	Located in the Civic Center; closed December 2007
United States	Washington	Bellevue	2006	2008	Located in Lincoln Square, adjacent to the Bellevue Westin; opened in March 2006; closed in August 2008
United States	Arizona	Scottsdale	2006	2011	Located in the Hotel Valley Ho; opened in summer 2006; closed in July 2011 to make way for a more casual restaurant that would be open for more than just dinner
China		Shanghai	2006	2008	Opened in December 2006; closed February 2008
United States	Texas	Dallas	2007	2010	Located in the Hotel Palomar (formerly the Hilton Inn, where there was a location from 1967 to 1989); the original location was intact, refreshed, and reopened in March 2007; closed in January 2010 for temporary renovations due to a burst pipe; closure was announced to be permanent in April 2010
United States	Florida	Destin	2007	2010	Located in The Palms of Destin Resort; opened in April 2007; closed in 2010
United States	Nevada	Las Vegas	2007	2009	Located in the Planet Hollywood Resort & Casino's Miracle Mile Shops; opened in October 2007; closed in 2009
China		Beijing	2007	2008	Opened in December 2007; closed in February 2008
United States	Illinois	Chicago	2008	2011	Opened in December 2008 on the ground floor of the Newberry Plaza building, using much of the original decor from the former Palmer House Hilton location; closed in July 2011
United States	California	Los Angeles	2009	2014	Located in the L.A. Live entertainment district, adjacent to the Staples Center; opened in 2009; closed March 2014
India	Maharashtra	Mumbai	2013	2017	Located in High Street Phoenix
India	Karnataka	Bangalore	2012	2015	Located in Phoenix Marketcity
Saudi Arabia	Riyadh	Riyadh	2009	2019	Located in the Panorama Mall
United States	Oregon	Portland	2011	2016	Located in the Pearl District from 2011 to March 2016, Rent for the location was said to be $20,000 a month and the restaurant never made a profit.
United Arab Emirates	Dubai	Dubai	2012	Unknown	Located in Dubai Festival City
United Arab Emirates	Dubai	Dubai	2014	Unknown	Trader Vic's Mai-Tai Lounge; Located in Al Fattan Marine Towers
United Arab Emirates	Ras Al Khaimah	Ras Al Khaimah	2014	2021	Trader Vic's Mai-Tai Lounge; Located in the Hilton Al Hamra Beach & Golf Resort
United Arab Emirates	Dubai	Dubai	1994	2024	Located in the Millennium Plaza Downtown, formerly the Crowne Plaza Dubai

== Books of recipes and stories ==
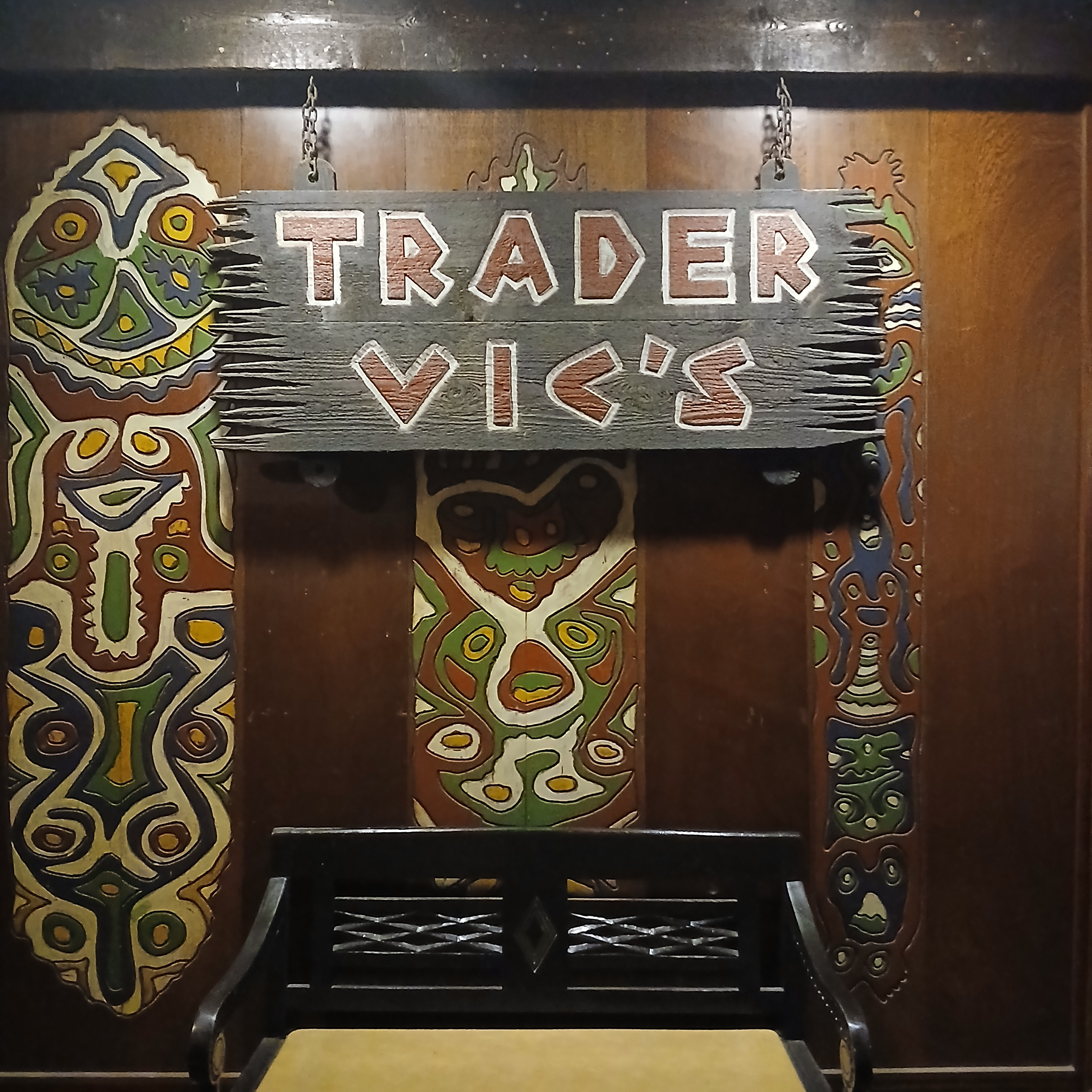
- Entrance to Trader Vic's in Atlanta in 2026
  Trader Vic's Book of Food and Drink (1946)
- Bartender's Guide by Trader Vic (1947)
- Trader Vic's Kitchen Kibitzer (1952)
- Trader Vic's Pacific Island Cookbook (1968)
- Trader Vic's Bartenders Guide (1972)
- The Menehunes (1972)
- Trader Vic's Book of Mexican Cooking (1973)
- Frankly Speaking: Trader Vic's Own Story (1973) (ISBN 0385031750)
- Trader Vic's Rum Cookery & Drinkery (1974)
- Trader Vic's Helluva Man's Cookbook (1976)

== Books published by third parties ==
- Trader Vic's Tiki Party!: Cocktails & Food to Share with Friends
- Cocktails of the South Pacific and Beyond (with a detailed early history of Trader Vic's original location)
- Smuggler's Cove: Exotic Cocktails, Rum, and the Cult of Tiki by Martin Cate with Rebecca Cate discusses the franchise

== In popular culture ==
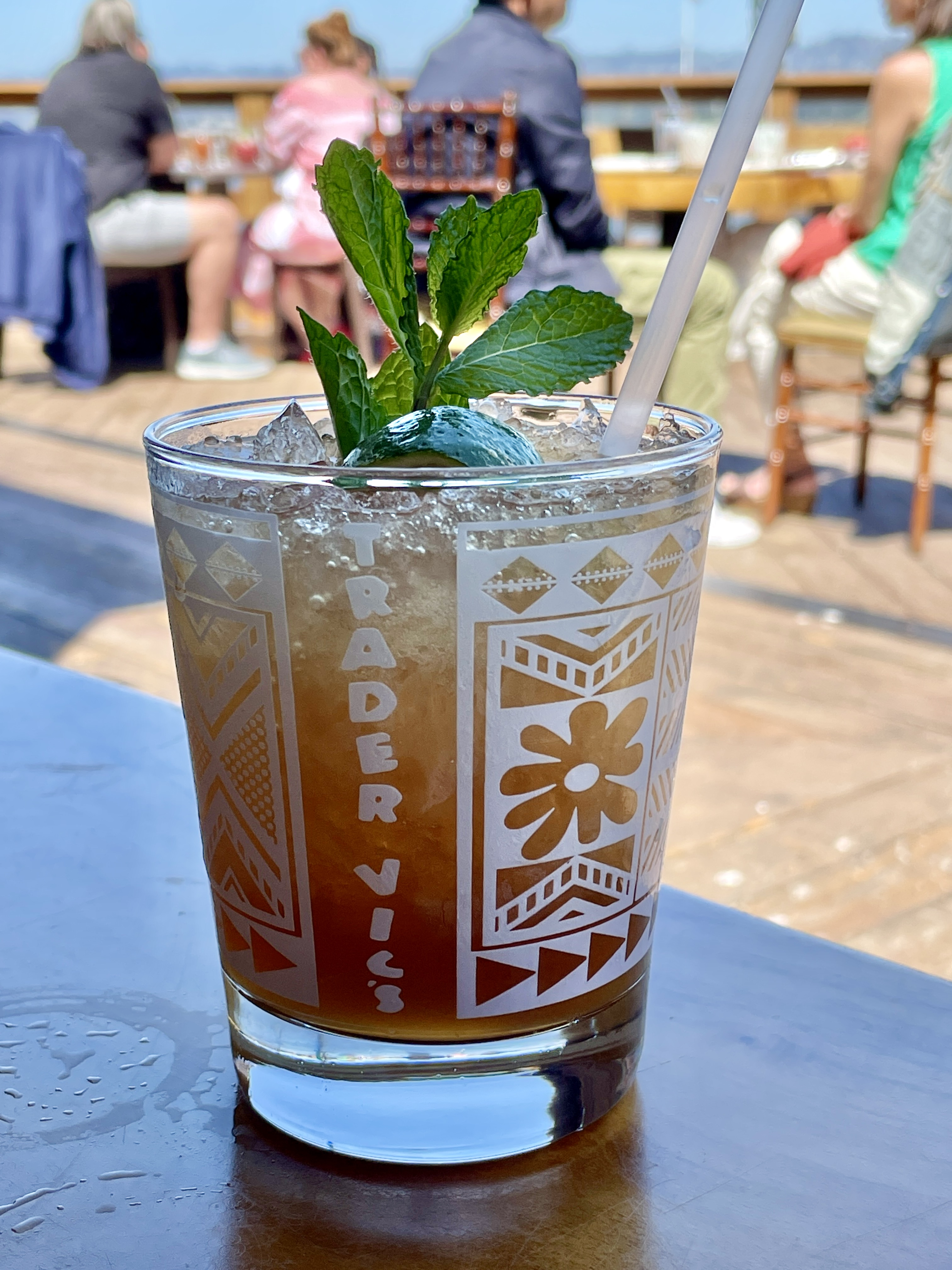
A cocktail served at Trader Vic's in Emeryville, CA

The restaurant is referenced by the character Norma in the 1968 screenplay "Plaza Suite", by Neil Simon.

The song "Werewolves of London," a Top 40 hit co-written by Warren Zevon and appearing on his 1978 album Excitable Boy, contains the line "I saw a werewolf drinking a piña colada at Trader Vic's." The Trader Vic's in London opened in 1963 and closed in 2022.

The restaurant is also referenced by Bill Murray's character, Frank Cross, to John Forsythe's character, Lew Hayward, in the 1988 movie Scrooged.

In the film Frost/Nixon the character of David Frost orders takeout from Trader Vic's while staying in The Beverly Hilton, which formerly had a Trader Vic's location inside the hotel. The character orders a cheeseburger.

In the film Thunder Force Jason Bateman and Melissa McCarthy dine at a Trader Vic's, with the scene filmed at the Atlanta location.

In the New York Times bestseller and 2012 100 Notable Books, Beautiful Ruins, by Jess Walter, Trader Vic's in Seattle, Washington is the setting of a scene between two characters in September 1967. In Chapter 16, "After the Fall" a couple meet at Trader Vic's and one walks "into a burst of warm air and bamboo, tiki and totem, dugout canoe hung from the ceiling."

== See also ==
- Trader Joe's, which was inspired in part by the success of Trader Vic's
