= Flaming volcano =

Large tropical group cocktail

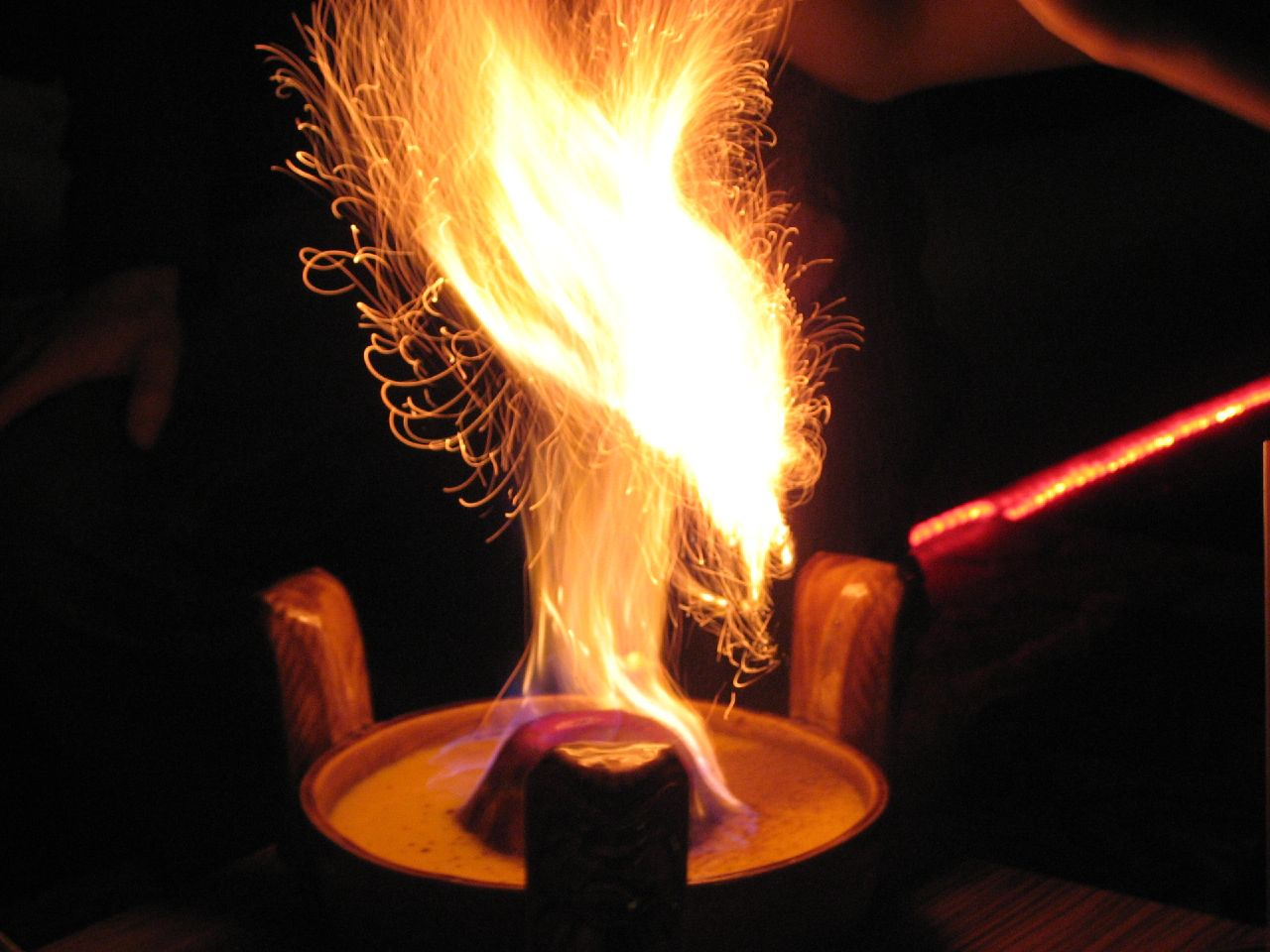
- A "volcano bowl" flaming cocktail
- Type: Mixed drink
- Ingredients: 1 US fluid ounce (30 ml) light rum; 1 oz. brandy; 1 oz. overproof rum; 4 US fluid ounces (120 ml) orange juice; 2 US fluid ounces (60 ml) lemon juice, unsweetened; 2 oz. orgeat syrup
- Base spirit: Rum
- Standard drinkware: Special: volcano bowl
- Standard garnish: pineapple and/or orange quarter slices, maraschino cherries
- Served: Frozen: blended with ice
- Preparation: Combine ingredients except overproof rum with 2 scoops of crushed ice in a blender. Pour, and place small amount of overproof rum into volcano and carefully light.

Flaming volcano is a large tropical group cocktail typically made with rum, brandy, pineapple juice, orange juice, and orgeat syrup. Many variations exist, and the cocktail in the 21st century is more about the presentation than an adherence to a set list of ingredients. It is usually a multi-user drink, served to a group in a special vessel known as a volcano bowl, which is a decorative ceramic bowl (typically of about 32 US fluid ounces (950 ml) capacity) designed with a rising central hub feature resembling a volcanic cone. The cone includes a "crater" reservoir which can be partially filled with rum or another flammable liquor. The crater liquor is carefully ignited when serving, creating a mild volcanic ambiance with its central blue flame.

A flaming volcano is usually served to a group of two or more people with a set of very long straws to facilitate convenient group sipping from a comfortable distance and for safety. It is sometimes called a scorpion bowl.

== History ==
The communal flaming volcano drink is said to have been started in Hawaii in the 1950s or 1960s as a cross between flammable one person ice formed "volcano cockails" and larger communal bowl cocktails. Jeff Berry in Beachbum Berry Remixed has Don the Beachcomber as an early example of serving the larger flaming bowl at his location in St. Paul, Minnesota. He also lists a Lei Lani Volcano variation from the Polyneisan Village Resort (Walt Disney World) from the 1970s. It is typically served only at tiki bars. It also has strong roots in its precursor, the scorpion bowl.

Some claim that it originated from or was popular in Chile during the times of Augusto Pinochet., but credible sources, especially as to the drink's original Chilean origin, are non-existent.

== Preparation and variations ==
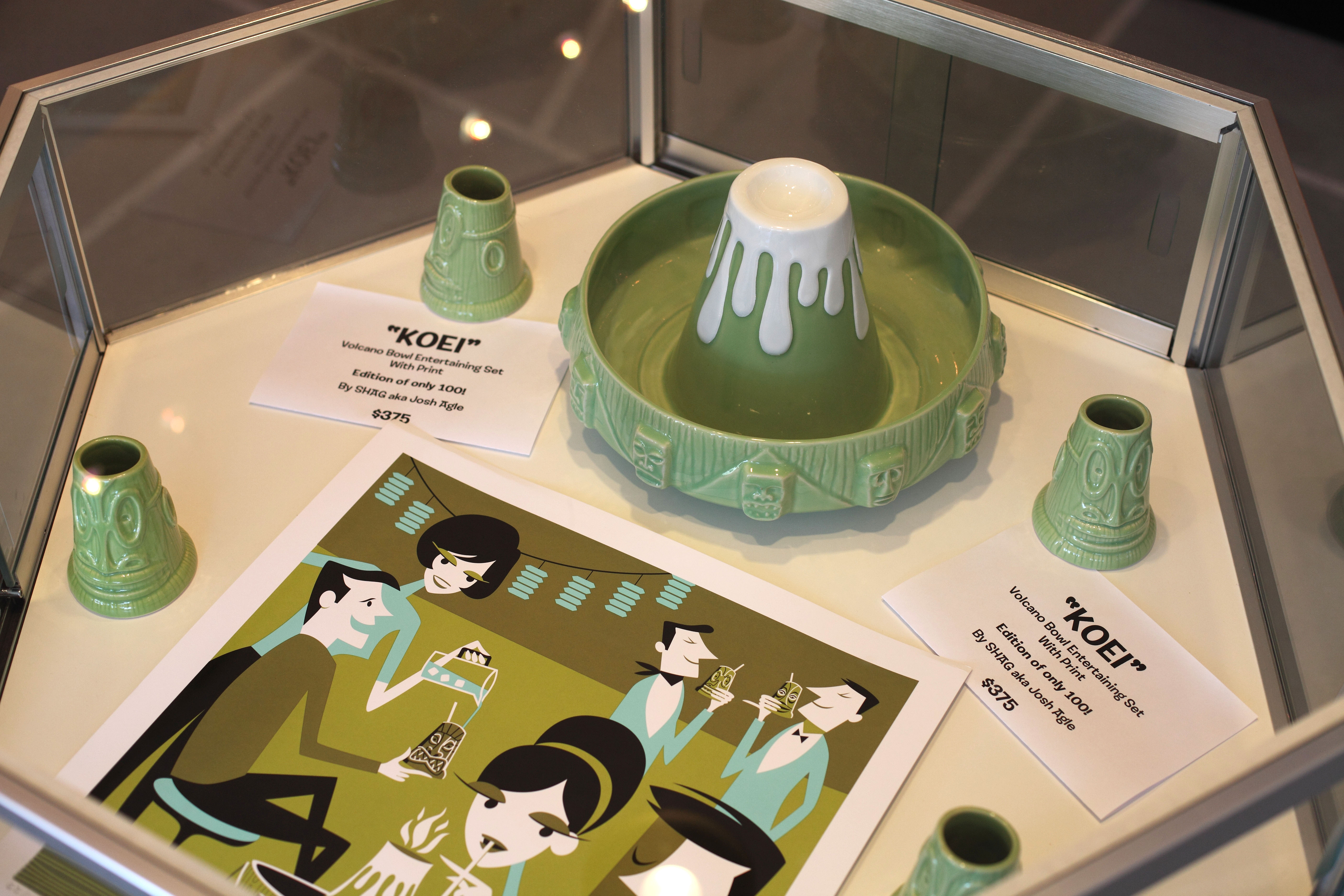
A volcano bowl designed by Shag

One version of flaming volcano is prepared by blending the ingredients with ice. It is sometimes served with dry ice to provide for a fog effect. The base liquor is usually some form of rum, with brandy commonly added, but vodka and even gin appear in some recipes. Other versions might use lime juice, grapefruit juice, maple syrup, guava nectar, or coconut rum.

The cocktail was also rebranded as "the mystery drink" at tiki Bars such as the Kahiki and the Mai Kai.

Early versions of the ceramic bowl were made by Orchids of Hawaii and Bamboo of China. Newer versions have been designed by artists such as Shag (pictured) and others.

Another version of the drink was served at Star Trek: The Experience in Las Vegas, called the Warp Core Breach. It is made with rum, Razzmatazz raspberry liqueur, fruit juices, and used dry ice for the "coolant leak" effect. This version was made specifically for the experience.

== In popular culture ==
As noted in the book The B-52's Universe by Mats Sexton, the members of The B-52's decided to form the band after sharing a flaming volcano at a Chinese Restaurant in Athens, Georgia in November 1976. Due to a lack of funds, the members decided to share a cocktail rather than order food.

== See also ==
- List of cocktails
- Tiki mugs
- Tiki culture
