= Short Cuts (soundtrack) =

Soundtrack album by Various artists
- Released: 1993
- Label: Imago Recording Company
- Producer: Hal Willner

The Short Cuts Soundtrack was released in 1993 as the soundtrack album for the film Short Cuts. The album was released by the Imago Recording Company.

Several well-known musicians provided material for this album, including Bono and The Edge from U2, Elvis Costello and Iggy Pop. Michael Stipe from R.E.M. makes a guest vocal appearance on one track.

Most of the songs are performed by jazz singer Annie Ross, who appears in the film. Actress Lori Singer performs cello on three classical compositions.

== Track listing ==
1. Open on Helicopters (sound effect) (0:50)
2. Annie Ross and the Low Note Quintet - "Conversation on a Barstool" (5:46) (Bono/The Edge)
3. Annie Ross and the Low Note Quintet - "To Hell With Love" (6:25) (Doc Pomus/Dr. John)
4. Annie Ross and the Low Note Quintet - "Punishing Kiss" (3:16) (Elvis Costello/Cait O'Riordan)
5. Antonín Dvořák: Cello Concerto in B Minor (Lori Singer and the Trout Quartet) (5:16) (arr. Ladd McIntosh)
6. Annie Ross and the Low Note Quintet - "Blue" (4:47) (Jon Hendricks/Gildo Mahones)
7. Annie Ross and the Low Note Quintet - "Evil California (These Blues)" (3:48) (Terry Adams/Iggy Pop)
8. Igor Stravinsky: Berceuse from The Firebird (Lori Singer) (2:50)
9. Annie Ross and the Low Note Quintet - "A Thousand Years" (4:26) (Gavin Friday/Maurice Seezer)
10. Victor Herbert: Cello Concerto No. 2, op. 30 (Lori Singer and the Trout Quartet) (5:04) (arranged by Bruce Fowler)
11. Annie Ross and the Low Note Quintet - "Imitation of a Kiss" (4:37) (Roy Nathanson/David Cale/Marc Ribot)
12. Annie Ross and the Low Note Quintet - "Full Moon" (3:59) (Doc Pomus/Dr. John)
13. Annie Ross and the Low Note Quintet with Lori Singer - "I Don't Know You" (6:08) (Doc Pomus/Dr. John)
14. The Low Note Quintet-"Nothing Can Stop Me Now" (4:33) (Horace Silver)
15. Earthquake into Low Note - sound effect
16. Annie Ross and the Low Note Quintet - "Prisoner of Life" (Doc Pomus/Dr. John)/"I'm Gonna Go Fishin'" (Peggy Lee/Duke Ellington) (6:50)
17. Thomas Tree and Cory J. Coppage - "How Does She Do It So Quickly?" (0:50) (Tree/Coppage)

The Low Note Quintet consisted of Bruce Fowler on trombone, Terry Adams on piano, Gene Estes on the vibes, Greg Cohen on bass, and Bobby Previte on drums.

The Trout Quartet consisted of Stuart Kanin on violin, Anatoly Rosinsky on violin, Roland Kato on viola, and Armen Guzelimian on piano.

Other musicians:

- Iggy Pop: vocals on "Evil California"
- Michael Stipe: vocals on "Full Moon"
- Steven Bernstein: trumpet on "To Hell With Love" and "Full Moon"
- David Tronzo: slide guitar on "To Hell With Love", "Full Moon" and "I Don't Know You"
- Anthony Coleman: clavinet on "Evil California"
- Lenny Pickett: woodwinds on "Prisoner Of Life/I'm Gonna Go Fishin'"

Produced by Hal Willner. Recorded and mixed by Eric Liljestrand, except the Dvořák and Herbert tracks (mixed by Tom Lazarus), "Evil California" (mixed by Kevin Killen), Stravinsky's "Berceuse" (recorded and mixed by Tom Lazarus), "So Quickly" (produced by Thomas Tree, Cory Coppage and Michael Pfeiffer; recorded and mixed by Michael Pfeiffer) and "Full Moon" (recorded by John Keane).
