= Spunk! =

Studio album by Swamp Zombies
- Released: 1993
- Genre: folk punk
- Length: CD 34:02
- Label: Doctor Dream Records

Swamp Zombies chronology
A Frenzy of Music and Action! (1992)	Spunk! (1993)

Spunk! is the fifth and final album by Swamp Zombies. It was released on the Doctor Dream Records label in 1993.

== Track listing ==
1. "Purple"
2. "Daddy Long Legs"
3. "Mudbog"
4. "She's a Drag"
5. "She's So Far Out She's In" (originally performed by Dino, Desi, & Billy)
6. "Ashtray"
7. "I Love You, Etc."
8. "The Man With the Golden Gun" (from the James Bond film of the same name)
9. "Oatmeal"
10. "Come on Man, Let's Go"
11. "The Way I Walk"
12. "Missing Link"
13. "I Built a Wall"
14. "Ripoff Boy"
15. "Track 15"
