= Montezuma Was a Man of Faith =

EP by Andy Prieboy
- Released: 1991
- Genre: Rock
- Label: Hot Mustard Records/Doctor Dream Records
- Producer: Andy Prieboy

Andy Prieboy chronology
...Upon My Wicked Son (1990)	Montezuma Was a Man of Faith (1991)	Sins of Our Fathers (1995)

Professional ratings
Review scores
Source	Rating
AllMusic	link
Robert Christgau	link

Montezuma Was a Man of Faith is an EP by Andy Prieboy, released in 1991. The EP cover is an original stained glass piece created by Judith Schaechter. The inner photograph and image on the CD are by Ann Marie Aubin.

"Montezuma Was a Man of Faith" and "Joliet" previously appeared on the full-length album ...Upon My Wicked Son. "Whole Lotta Love" is a hillbilly-fied recording of the Led Zeppelin song featuring an uncredited Johnette Napolitano from Concrete Blonde.

== Track listing ==
1. "Montezuma Was a Man of Faith" (Prieboy) – 3:32
2. "Send in the Drugs" (Prieboy) – 3:37
3. "Joliet" (Prieboy) – 3:26
4. "Where I'm Calling You From" (Prieboy) – 3:25
5. "Whole Lotta Love" (Page/Plant/Jones/Bonham) – 3:03
