= ...Upon My Wicked Son =

1990 album by Andy Prieboy

Studio album by Andy Prieboy
- Released: 1990
- Genre: Pop rock
- Length: 48:42
- Label: Doctor Dream, Musidisc
- Producer: Andy Prieboy

Andy Prieboy chronology
...Upon My Wicked Son (1990)	Montezuma Was a Man of Faith (1991)

...Upon My Wicked Son is the first solo album by Andy Prieboy, released in 1990. The album cover is "Fallen Angel" by David Sandlin.

"On the Road Again" is a cover of the Canned Heat song, whose lyrics inspired the album's title. The song "Tomorrow, Wendy", about the suicide of a friend of Prieboy's, bears the rare distinction of having a cover version released (on Concrete Blonde's Bloodletting,) before the original album was released. Prieboy's version of the song features Concrete Blonde's singer Johnette Napolitano on vocals.

== Critical reception ==
Professional ratings
Review scores
Source	Rating
AllMusic	4/5 stars
Calgary Herald	B+
Chicago Tribune	3.5/4 stars
Los Angeles Daily News	3/4 stars
Los Angeles Times	3/5 stars

The Chicago Tribune stated that the album "showcases guitarist-vocalist Prieboy's knack for inventive pop-rock song-crafting and off-center lyric themes." The Los Angeles Times concluded that Prieboy "gets caught up in arty-smarty cleverness as he jumps from progressive blues to Weill-like theater tune to French cabaret, but at least he's out on the front lines grappling with fundamental human matters."

== Track listing ==
1. "On the Road Again" (Jim Oden) – 4:44 Performer – Beth Hooker
2. "To the Dogs" (Prieboy) – 4:09
3. "Montezuma Was a Man of Faith" (Prieboy) – 3:34
4. "Tomorrow, Wendy" (Prieboy) – 4:44 Performer – Johnette Napolitano
5. "Nearer to Morning" (Prieboy, Ned Leukhardt) – 3:24
6. "Man Talk" (Prieboy) – 4:45
7. "Loving the Highway Man" (Prieboy) – 3:32
8. "The New York Debut of an L.A. Artist (Jazz Crowd)" (Prieboy) – 2:20
9. "Joliet" (Prieboy) – 3:27
10. "That Was the Voice" (Prieboy) – 3:51
11. "For Love" (Prieboy) – 3:05
12. "Maybe That's Not Her Head" (Prieboy) – 3:22
13. "Big Rock Finish" (Prieboy, Ned Leukhardt) – 3:52

Note: "Maybe That's Not Her Head" and "Big Rock Finish" do not appear on the vinyl or cassette releases of the album.

== Personnel ==
From CD liner notes

- Backing vocals – Dee La Duke, Estefan Bravo, Jeff Hlavary, Joe Chamberlain, John Maxwell, Ken Petrosky, Steve Siegrist, Sue Rawley, Terry Gahan, Trudy Trulove
- Bass – Scott Thunes
- Drums – Dave Scott
- Drums, percussion, drum programming – Ned Leukhardt
- Engineer – Barry Rudolph, Francis Buckley, Joe Tortoricci*, Mike Fennel, Ryan Greene
- Guitar – Marc Moreland, Mikal Reid
- Guitar, piano, keyboards – Andy Prieboy
- Mixed by – Barry Rudolph, Francis Buckley
- Painting [Cover Painting] – David Sandlin
- Photography by – Reggie Ige
- Producer – Andy Prieboy
- Programmed by [Computer] – Mike Fennel
- Trombone – David Dean
- Violin – Michael Barberra*
- Written by – Andy Prieboy (tracks: 2 to 13)

Notes

From LP liner notes

- Johnette Napolitano appears courtesy of I.R.S. Records.
- Dave Scott appears by the grace of MCA Records and Kill for Thrills.
- Michael Barberra appears through the benevolence of Mary's Danish.
- The artist's home features the collection of Gretchen Victor.
- The cover painting "Fallen Angel" was painted by David Sandlin and licensed through the courtesy of Gracie Mansion Gallery. It comes from the collection of Danny Elfman.
