= Chicken Vulture Crow =

Studio album by Swamp Zombies
- Released: 1988
- Genre: Folk punk
- Label: Doctor Dream

Swamp Zombies chronology
Chicken Vulture Crow (1988)	Fink (1989)

Chicken Vulture Crow is the first album by Swamp Zombies. It was released on record in 1988.

== Critical reception ==
Professional ratings
Review scores
Source	Rating
AllMusic	2.5/5 stars

The Daily Breeze likened the album to "the Kingston Trio gone hard-core punk".

== Track listing ==
1. "Truly Needy"
2. "Love Zombie"
3. "Swamp Boy"
4. "Open Up Your Eyes"
5. "Pots and Pans"
6. "Coffeehouse Ray"
7. "Purple Haze" (originally by the Jimi Hendrix Experience)
8. "Zombie Jamboree" (originally by the Kingston Trio)
9. "Chucha"
10. "A Simple Desultory" (originally by Simon and Garfunkel)
11. "Phobia"
12. "Rudy the Magic Crow"
