= Sins of the Mother =

Sins of the Mother may refer to:

- Sins of the Mother (1991 film), a TV film directed by John Patterson, starring Elizabeth Montgomery, Dale Midkiff and Heather Fairfield
- "Sins of the Mother" (Birds of Prey), a 2002 episode of an American television series Birds of Prey
- Sins of the Mother (2010 film), a Lifetime Movie Network original film starring Jill Scott

== See also ==
- The Sins of the Mothers (1914), film directed by Ralph Ince starring Anita Stewart, Julia Swayne Gordon, and Ralph Ince
- Sins of the Father (disambiguation)
