= A Frenzy of Music and Action! =

Studio album by Swamp Zombies
- Released: 1992
- Genre: Folk punk
- Length: CD 44:36
- Label: Doctor Dream

Swamp Zombies chronology
Scratch and Sniff Car Crash (1990)	A Frenzy of Music and Action! (1992)	Spunk! (1993)

A Frenzy of Music and Action! is an album by the American band Swamp Zombies, released in 1992 on Doctor Dream Records. The band promoted the album by playing outside of 15 southern California record stores.

== Critical reception ==
The Los Angeles Times listed A Frenzy of Music and Action! among the best 15 Orange County albums of 1992.

== Track listing ==
1. "Green"
2. "Unemployed"
3. "Oddball"
4. "Three Deep Thinkers"
5. "I Bawled"
6. "Damnedest Thing"
7. "Puerto Angel"
8. "Lemon Girl"
9. "Johnny Quest"
10. "Mountain Man"
11. "Before You Just Do It"
12. "Go Go Boots"
13. "Track 13"
14. "Ballad of Ed Gein" (available on CD)
