= Judith Schaechter =

American glass artist

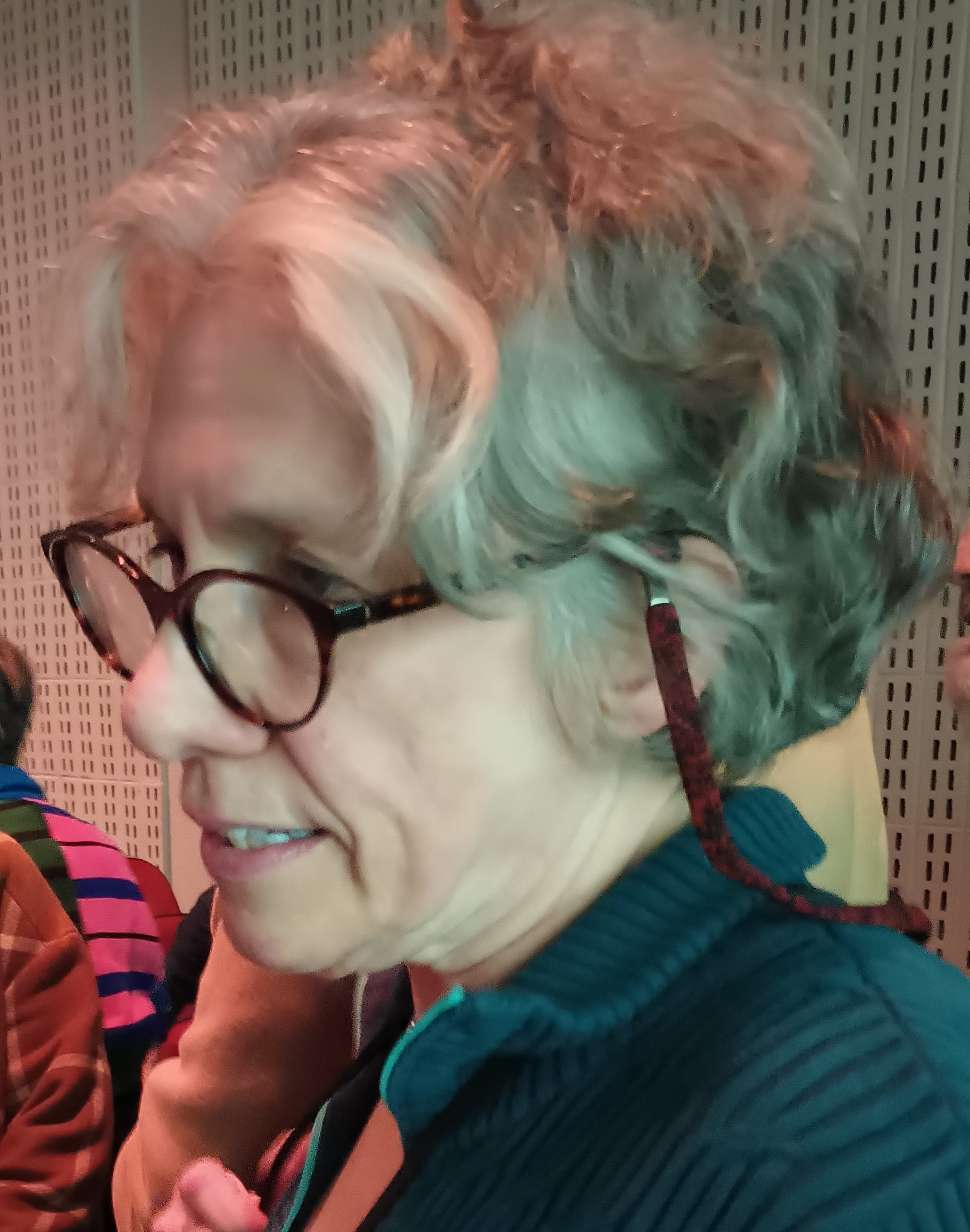
- Born: 1961 (age 64–65); Gainesville, Florida, U S.
- Education: B.F.A. in Glass, Rhode Island School of Design, 1983
- Known for: Stained glass
- Awards: Guggenheim Fellowship, National Endowment for the Arts Fellowship
- Website: judithschaecter.com

Judith Schaechter (born 1961, Gainesville, Florida) is a Philadelphia-based artist known for her work in the medium of stained glass. Her pieces often use symbolism from stained glass and Gothic traditions, but the distorted faces and figures in her work recall a 20th century German Expressionist painting style and her subject matter is secular. Shaechter's work often involves images that might be considered disturbing such as death, disease, or violence. Early Schaechter pieces, for example, such as King of Maggots and Vide Futentes make use of memento mori, symbols of death found in church architecture during medieval times.

== Biography ==
The Birth of Eve (2013) by Judith Schaechter at the Renwick Gallery in Washington, DC in 2022

Schaechter was born in Gainesville, Florida, in 1961, but spent her formative years growing up in Massachusetts. She has served on the faculty of numerous art schools, such as the Rhode Island School of Design. She served as an adjunct professor in the Crafts Department at The University of the Arts in Philadelphia, Pennsylvania, and adjunct faculty at the New York Academy of Art in New York, New York. Schaechter has also taught courses at Pilchuck Glass School in Seattle, Penland School of Crafts, Toyama Institute of Glass (Toyama, Toyama, Japan) and Australian National University in Canberra, Australia.

She illustrated the cover for musician Andy Prieboy's 1991 album Montezuma Was a Man of Faith. Her work has been exhibited in the Renwick Gallery of the Smithsonian Institution, the Museum of Arts and Design in New York City, the Victoria and Albert Museum in London, and the Fine Arts Museums of San Francisco. Schaechter's Bigtop Flophouse Bedspins appeared in the 2002 Whitney Biennial. She has artwork in the collections of the Metropolitan Museum of Art, the Victoria and Albert Museum, the Hermitage Museum, the Philadelphia Museum of Art, the Corning Museum of Glass, the Renwick Gallery, among other public and private collections.

Her stained glass artwork has been included in two survey textbooks: Women Artists by Nancy Heller and Makers: a History of American Studio Craft by Bruce Metcalf and Janet Koplos.

Her piece Birth of Venus was included in the Renwick's 50th anniversary exhibition "This Present Moment: Crafting a Better World".

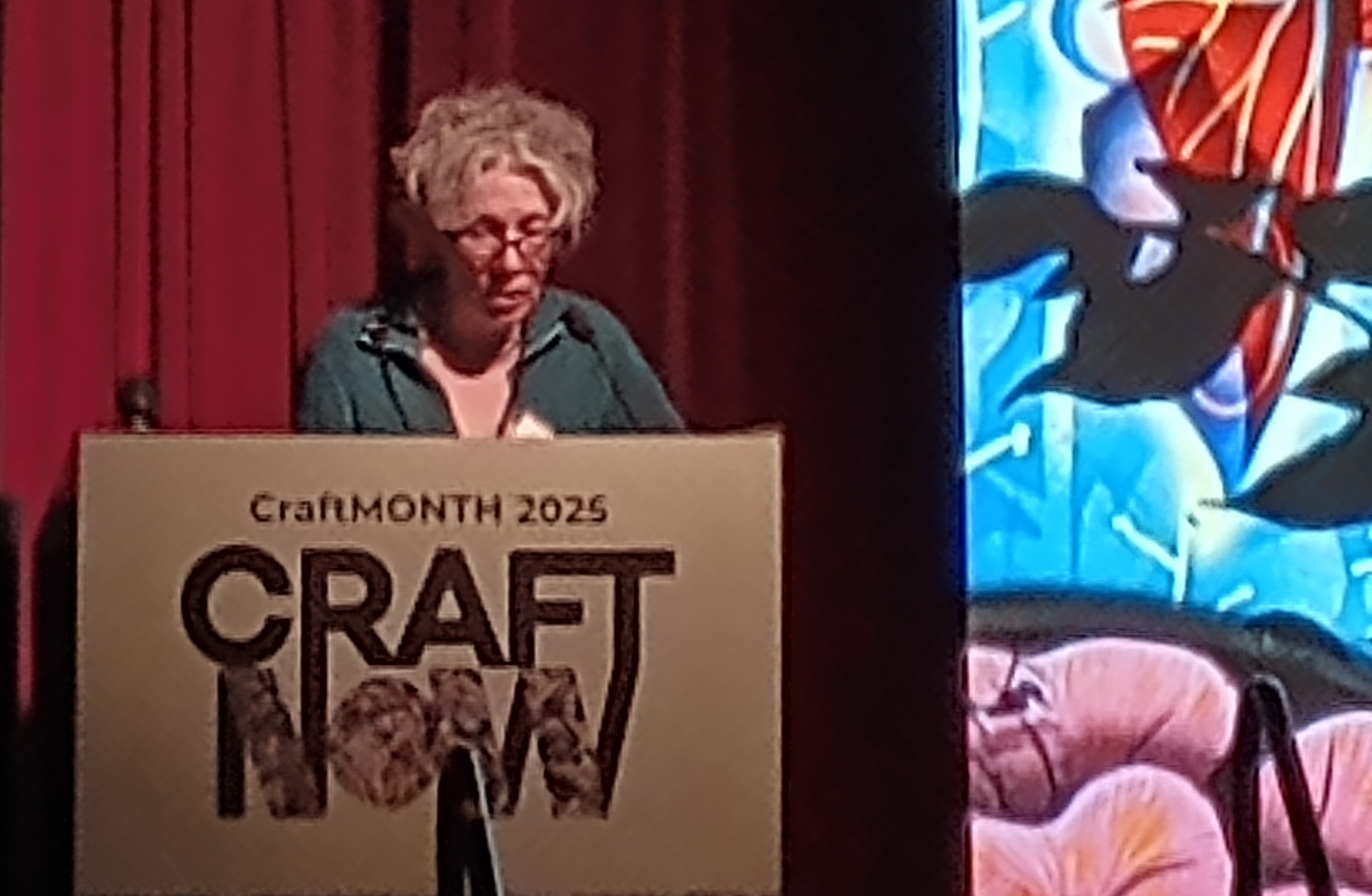
Judith Schaechter at Craftnow 2025

The James A. Michener Art Museum in Pennsylvania showed Judith Schaechter: Super/Natural, an immersive monumental stained glass dome exploring biophilia, until September 14, 2025.
