= Sins of My Father =

Sins of My Father may refer to:

- Sins of My Father (film), a 2009 Argentine documentary film about Pablo Escobar
- "Sins of My Father" (song), a 2012 song by Usher
- "Sins of My Father", a 1995 song by Andy Prieboy from Sins of Our Fathers
- "Sins of My Father", a 2004 song by Tom Waits from Real Gone

== See also ==
- Sins of the Father (disambiguation)
