= Scratch and Sniff Car Crash =

Studio album by Swamp Zombies
- Released: 1990
- Genre: folk punk
- Length: CD 43:36
- Label: Doctor Dream Records

Swamp Zombies chronology
Fink (1989)	Scratch and Sniff Car Crash (1990)	A Frenzy of Music and Action! (1992)

Scratch and Sniff Car Crash is the third album by the Swamp Zombies and was released in 1990 under the Doctor Dream Records label. It is available on record, tape, or CD. The first 1,000 LPs and the first 500 CDs actually had a "car crash" scratch and sniff sticker in which the odor of a mixture of gasoline and burning rubber was released upon scratching. The album title's origin lies in the fact that two Swamp Zombies band members were involved in separate car crashes at around the same time.

== Track listing ==
1. "Love Crash"
2. "Chicken Vulture Crow"
3. "Creeps"
4. "Misfit Man"
5. "Rodentia"
6. "Desolation Girl"
7. "Happy"
8. "California"
9. "Cat's Meow"
10. "Narcosatanico"
11. "Speed Racer"
12. "High Road"
13. "Gary 9"
14. "Fight the Power" [originally by Public Enemy (bonus CD track)]
15. "Suicidal Overtones" (hidden cassette track)
