= Fink (album) =

Studio album by Swamp Zombies
- Released: 1989
- Label: Doctor Dream Records

Swamp Zombies chronology
Chicken Vulture Crow (1988)	Fink (1989)	Scratch and Sniff Car Crash (1990)

Fink is the second album by the Swamp Zombies. It was released in 1989 under the Doctor Dream Records label.

== Track listing ==
1. Mr. Freako
2. We Just Don't Belong
3. Zipper
4. We Got Five Bucks
5. Big Black Shoes
6. Victor
7. Mr. Hate
8. Land Of 1000 Beers
9. Dig A Hole In The Love...
10. Crawfish
11. Cold Fables
12. You Always Think
13. Now It's Gone
14. Denny's Incident
