= Sins of Our Fathers =

Studio album by Andy Prieboy
- Released: 8 August 1995
- Genre: Rock
- Length: 57:00
- Label: Doctor Dream Records
- Producer: Andy Prieboy, Mike Gormley

Andy Prieboy chronology
Montezuma Was a Man of Faith (1991)	Sins of Our Fathers (1995)

Sins of Our Fathers is the second album by the American musician Andy Prieboy, released in 1995. The album cover graphic is by Josh Agle and is based on Hougoumont by Robert Gibb. The cover art depicts the repelling of Jerome's noon assault at the Battle of Waterloo. The album was recorded in a Los Angeles garage.

== Critical reception ==
Professional ratings
Review scores
Source	Rating
AllMusic	4.5/5 stars

The Telegram & Gazette wrote that "Prieboy writes clever songs—loading them up with cultural and literary references—and delivers them with a big, theatrical sound that crosses Queen with Tom Lehrer." The Age listed the album as the fourth best of 1995.

== Track listing ==
1. "Sins of My Fathers" – 5:39
2. "How Would I Know Love Now" – 5:53
3. "Wine Red and TV Blue" – 4:32
4. "All For Your Love Again" – 3:58
5. "Psycho Ex" – 2:14
6. "Cannot Not" – 5:06
7. "When the Heart Awakes" – 3:38
8. "Robbing Her Own Room" – 4:34
9. "When This Dream Is Over" – 4:26
10. "Who Do You Think We're Coming For" – 5:08
11. "You Don't Owe Me Anything" – 4:54
12. "Build a Better Garden" – 5:25
13. "Daddy Buy Baby a Boobjob" – 1:34

== Personnel ==
- Chad Fischer - drums, percussion, vocals
