= Sins of the Father =

Sins of the Father(s) may refer to:

- Ancestral sin

== Print ==
- Sins of the Father (Buffy novel), a 1999 novel based on Buffy the Vampire Slayer
- Sins of the Father (Judge Anderson novel), a 2006 novel based on Anderson: Psi Division
- The Sins of the Father (Archer novel), 2012
- The Sins of the Father: A Romance of the South, 1912 novel by Thomas Dixon Jr.
- Pirates of the Caribbean: Jack Sparrow: Sins of the Father, 2007 novel
- Sins of the Father, a 1991 novel by William Wright
- Sins of the Father, a 1994 story arc of the comic book series Starman (vol. 2)
- The Sins of the Father: Joseph P. Kennedy and the Dynasty He Founded, a 1996 non-fiction book by Ronald Kessler
- "The Sins of the Father", a story arc of the 1999 comic book Anarky
- The Sins of the Fathers, alternative title of A New Lease of Death, 1967 novel by Ruth Rendell
- The Sins of the Fathers, a Matthew Scudder detective novel published in 1976 by Lawrence Block
- The Sins of Our Fathers, a 1970 analysis of the origins of The Troubles in Northern Ireland by Owen Dudley Edwards
- The Sins of Our Fathers, a 2022 novella set in The Expanse book series by James S.A. Corey
- Heed the Thunder, a 1946 novel also known as Sins of the Fathers

== Film ==
- Sins of the Fathers (1928 film), an American silent film
- Sins of the Fathers (1948 film), a Canadian film
- Sins of the Father (1985 film), a television film starring James Coburn
- Sins of the Father (2002 film), a television drama by Robert Dornhelm

== Television ==
- "The Sins of the Fathers", a 1954 episode of The Motorola Television Hour
- "Sins of the Father (Dynasty), a 1989 episode of the prime time soap opera Dynasty
- "Sins of the Father" (Star Trek: The Next Generation), a 1990 episode of Star Trek: The Next Generation
- "Sins of the Father", a 1990 episode of Inspector Morse
- "The Sins of the Fathers", a subtitle for the 1996 season of Spider-Man series
- "Sins of the Father" (The New Batman Adventures), a 1997 episode of The New Batman Adventures
- "Shins of the Father", a 1997 episode of King of the Hill
- "The Sins of the Father", a 2009 episode of Merlin
- Sins of the Father (Big Love), a 2010 episode
- "Sins of the Father", a 2011 episode of NCIS
- "Sins of the Father", a 2011 episode of Robin Hood
- "Sins of the Fathers", a 2011 episode of Haven
- "Sins of the Father" (Arrow), a 2016 episode of Arrow
- "Sins of the Father", a 2018 episode of Shooter
- "Sins of the Father", a 2019 episode of Yellowstone.
- "Sins of the Fathers", a 2021 episode of S.W.A.T.
- "Sins of the Father" (Dexter: New Blood), a 2022 episode of Dexter: New Blood
- Sins of the Father (TV series), a 2025 Philippine television crime thriller drama series
- "The Sins of the Father" (King & Conqueror), a 2025 episode

== Music ==
- "Sins of the Father", a 1992 song by Black Sabbath from Dehumanizer
- "Sins of the Father", a 2011 song by Riot from Immortal Soul
- "Sins of the Father", a 2013 song by Akihiro Honda and Ludvig Forssell for the Metal Gear Solid V: The Phantom Pain trailer and video game
- "Sins of the Father", a 2015 song by Being as an Ocean from the album Being as an Ocean

== Other ==
- Sins of Our Fathers, a 1995 album by Andy Prieboy
- Gabriel Knight: Sins of the Fathers, a 1993 video game by Sierra On-Line

== See also ==
- Sins of My Father (disambiguation)
