= El Grupo Sexo =

American funk-metal band

- Origin: Orange County, California
- Genres: Funk, Rock
- Years active: 1985-1987
- Labels: Doctor Dream Records
- Past members: Dave Otto, Don Carroll, Jason Mann, John Karsawa, Tony Atheron, Vince Meghrouni, Miles Gillett

El Grupo Sexo was an American funk-metal band formed in Orange County, California that was active from 1985 to 1987.

== History ==
Jason Mann formed the band sometime in 1985. They would release 2 albums, Mom's Home and Up Periscope. They disbanded in December 1987.

== Band Members ==
Jason Mann- Vocals, lead guitar

Vince Meghrouni- Tenor Sax, Flute, Percussion, Vocals

Don Carroll- Bass, Accoridian

John Karsawa- Rhythm guitar, backing bass

Tony Atherton- Saxophone, Bass Clarinet, vocals

Miles Gillett- Drums

Dave Otto- Trumpet, horn

== Discography ==
=== Albums ===
==== Mom's Home (1986) ====
Up Periscope (1988)
