= Suffering bastard =

Type of cocktail

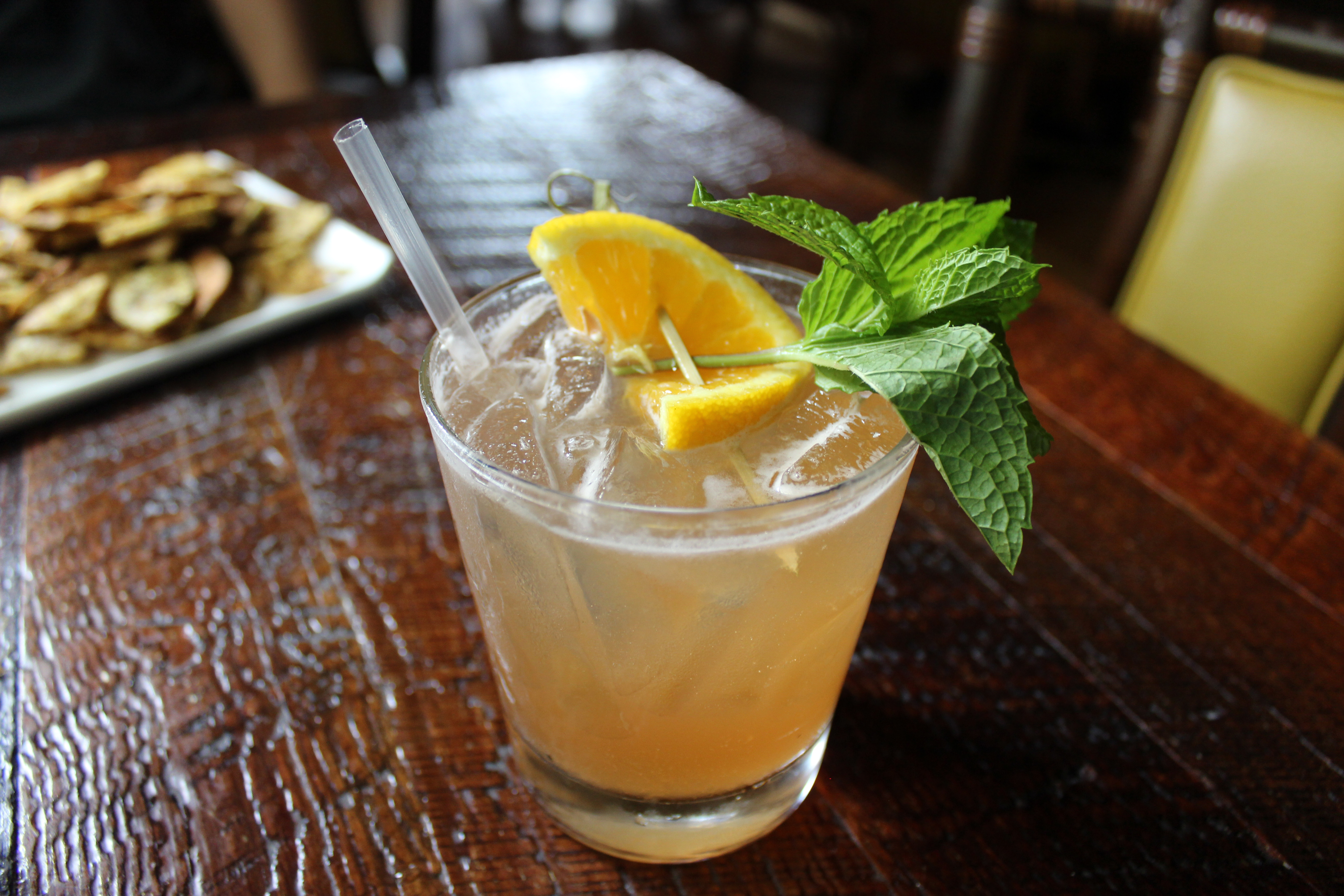
- Ingredients: 30 ml Cognac/brandy or Bourbon; 30 ml gin; 15 ml fresh lime juice; 2 dashes Angostura bitters; top up ginger beer
- Standard drinkware: Collins glass
- Standard garnish: mint springs [sic] and optionally an orange slice as well
- Served: On the rocks: poured over ice
- Preparation: Pour all ingredients into a cocktail shaker except the ginger beer, shake well with ice, Pour unstrained into a Collins glass or in the original S. Bastard mug and top up with ginger beer.

The suffering bastard is the name for two different mixed drinks, one being more of a standard cocktail (essentially a gin-and-brandy buck with added Angostura bitters) associated with World War II and the other being more of an exotic drink associated with Tiki bars. As is the case with many cocktails, there are multiple recipe variations and historical origins have been argued and changed over time. Two of the earliest recipe versions have very different ingredients. One from bartender Joe Scialom (1942) calls for brandy and gin, while another from Tiki pioneer Victor J. Bergeron (AKA Trader Vic) primarily uses rum along with "secret ingredients" and is known for being garnished with a cucumber.

== Suffering bastard (1942) ==
According to Jeff Berry and others, a suffering bastard cocktail was created at the Shepheard's Hotel in Cairo. Bartender Joe Scialom was looking to make a hangover drink for allied troops and according to the story made one as a "cure" for the suffering soldiers who complained about the poor quality of liquor in the area.

Both the drink and the hotel played a role in WWII. When the war was going well for the Axis, German General Rommel allegedly said "I'll be drinking champagne in the master suite at Shepheard's soon." The allies did well, however, and the drink was supposedly so popular with the troops that a telegram was sent asking for several gallons to be made and brought to the front lines.

According to Berry, Scialom's original handwritten recipe as provided by his daughter called for brandy. Bourbon was frequently swapped out for the brandy where it was available however, and for a short period of time the drink was also called the suffering bar steward, for those that found the use of the word bastard offensive. Berry also notes that when Scialom made other versions he had different names for them, and that the addition of bourbon made the drink a Dying Bastard, and the addition of both bourbon and rum made it a Dead Bastard. The VenTiki Lounge uses brandy for the suffering bastard on their classic tiki drinks menu, but the recipe varies from bar to bar and is significantly different from the one created by Trader Vic.

== Suffering bastard (Trader Vic) ==
Although the suffering bastard is strongly associated with Tiki bars and Trader Vic, a recipe for the cocktail was not included in his 1947 Bartender's Guide recipe book. It does appear in later editions however, and appeared in the 1968 Trader Vic's Pacific Island Cookbook and calling for both light and dark rums with lime juice and dashes of Curaçao, orgeat syrup, and rock candy syrup. Other Vic recipes called for the use of his commercial Mai-Tai mix as a basis along with multiple rums, lime juice, and the unusual garnishment for a Tiki drink of a cucumber peel. A hand written note allegedly from a waiter at Trader Vic's circa 1970 listed the "key" ingredient as being the inclusion of rum from Barbados. A 21st century cocktail menu at Trader Vic's describes the drink as "A forthright blend of rums, lime and liquors with an affinity for cucumber".

== Suffering bastard mug ==
When ordered in Tiki bars, the suffering bastard is often served in the uniquely shaped and eponymously named "suffering bastard Tiki mug", made to look like a squat fellow with a hangover holding his hands over the top of his head in pain. According to Trader Vic's the mug originally had the name of Mai-Tai Joe, perhaps because Trader Vic is largely credited with having invented the Mai-Tai and his commercial Mai-Tai mix is sometimes used in the making of suffering bastard cocktails.

== See also ==
- List of cocktails
