= Tiki mug =

Ceramic drinking vessel

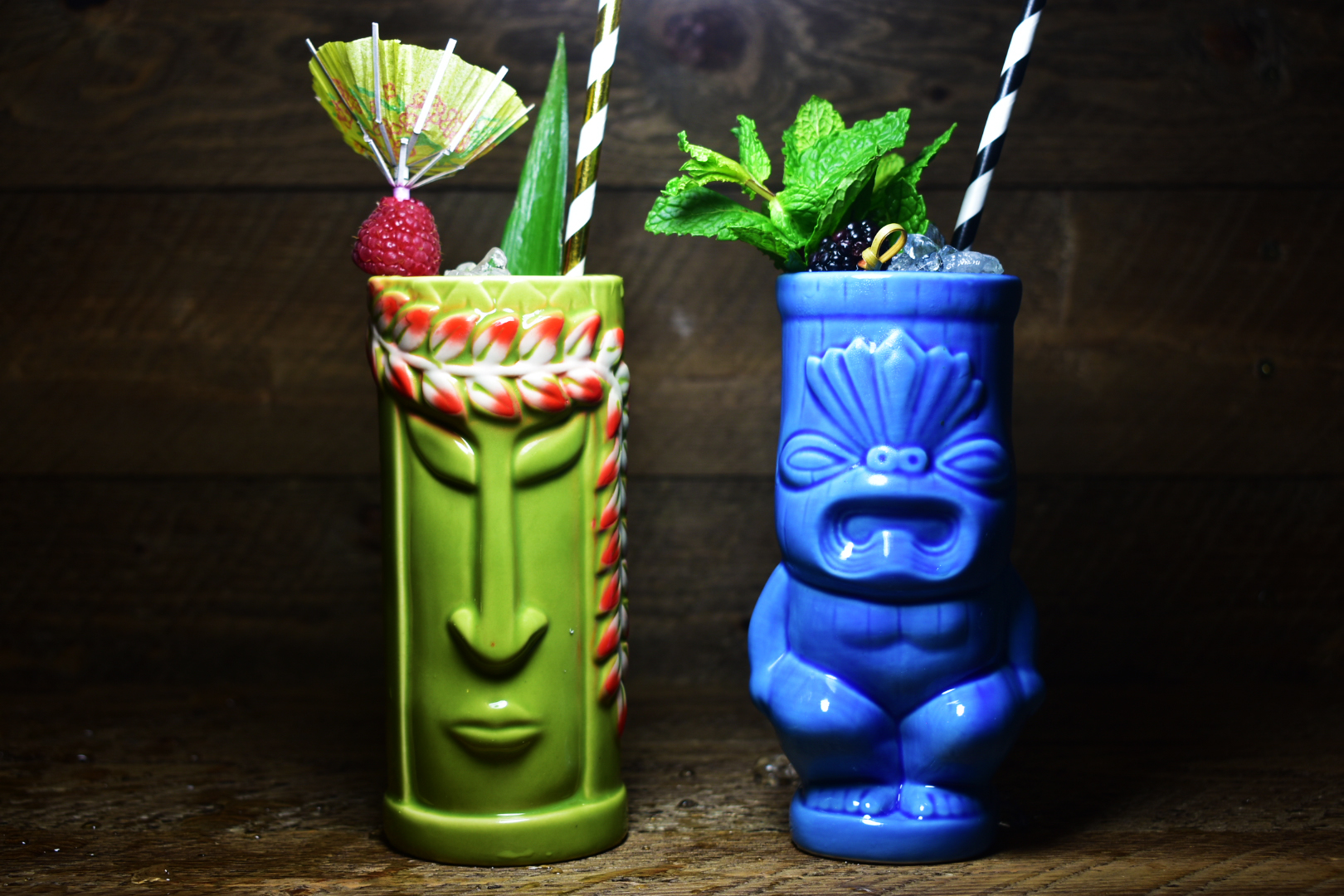
Cocktails served in tiki mugs

A tiki mug is a large ceramic cocktail drinking vessel that originated in tiki bars and tropical-themed restaurants. The term "tiki mug" is a blanket term for the sculptural drinkware even though they vary in size and most do not contain handles. They typically depict Polynesian, mock-Polynesian, tropical, nautical, or retro themes, and as the term is used generically do not always emulate a tiki. When used to serve drinks they are frequently garnished with fruit or decorative drink umbrellas and swizzle sticks.

Outside of tiki enthusiasts, the mugs are not commonly seen in use beyond tiki bars and restaurants, but some collect them as examples of kitsch.

== History ==
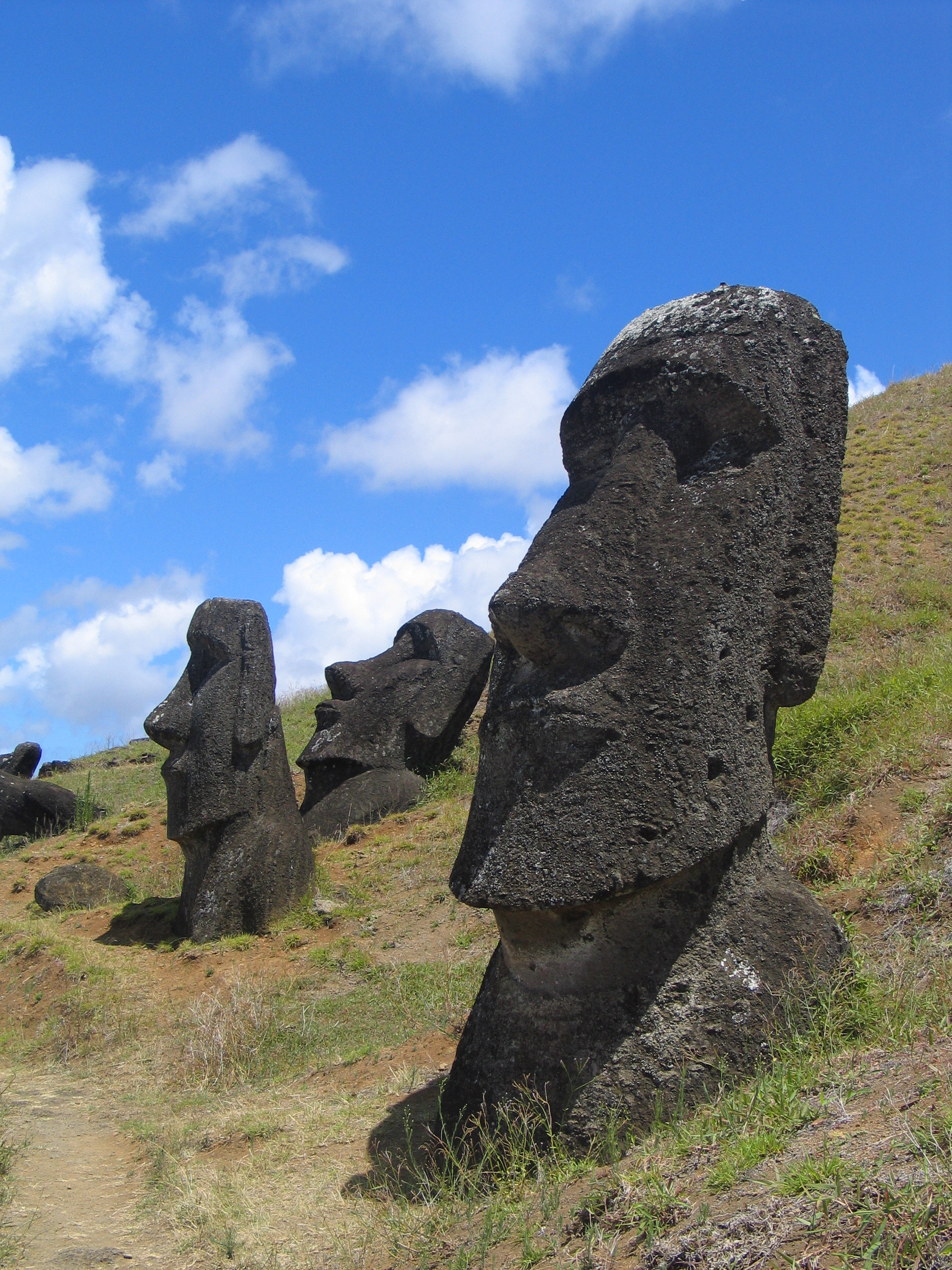
Moai statues, used as basis for a common tiki mug design

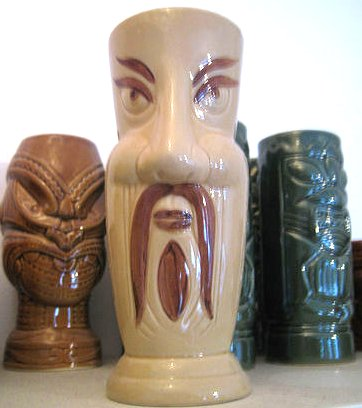
A Fu Manchu mug

What many would consider to be the earliest US "tiki mugs" were ceramics in the shape of a skull or an ordinary ceramic vessel with a hula girl-related motif. Mugs meant to emulate a tiki carving, what some would consider to be a "true" tiki mug, did not come to the United States until the late 1950s.

A little-known antecedent (and the possible inspiration) of these earliest US tiki mugs and other later US tiki-motif tableware, is a range of mid-century modern ceramic ware from New Zealand, made by Crown Lynn. Designed by Harry Hargreaves, the Wharetana Ware range assimilated Māori design, including tikis, in a contemporary way and, alongside items such as tiki ashtrays and salt and pepper shakers, included a tiki mug named "Ruru and Weku". This tiki mug dates from 1949, making it the earliest-known tiki mug in the world.

Donn Beach, the father of Tiki, did not originally serve his drinks in ceramic vessels. An undated menu from his restaurant is labeled as "Don the Beachcomber's Delectable Thirty", which states "this souvenir menu is available at fifty cents". The thirty drinks on the menu are shown in elaborate shapes and sizes, but the vast majority are in glassware and none depict a tiki. Discounting their shapes, the most unusual aspects of the vessels were for those serving the Pi Yi and coconut rum cocktails, which were hollowed-out baby pineapples and green coconuts, respectively. An expanded drink menu from 1941 that listed sixty drinks used similar illustrations, none depicting a tiki but still displaying hollowed-out fruit.

Trader Vic's 1947 Bartender's Guide contains two pages of illustrations for the barware to be used with specific drinks. It displays 30 different vessels, and as with Beach's menu the vast majority are glassware. Four of them are ceramic, however: a ceramic skull mug (for hot buttered rum and Coffee Grog), and a scorpion bowl, kava bowl, and a tall Fog Cutter mug all depicting islands scenes with native women. As the use of ceramic mugs started to expand many remained fairly basic, such as plain ceramic coconut shells or miniature rum barrels, but mugs became more stylized and some began to bear the name of the tiki bar that served them.

Those in the shape of Easter Island statues (moai) are among the most common, fueled in large part by the popularity of Thor Heyerdahl's 1947 Kon-Tiki expedition and 1957 Aku-Aku novel. Steven Crane is largely credited with making "real tiki" carvings a major design theme in south seas inspired restaurants. The origin of who created and what was the first true tiki-shaped mug is frequently debated and has not been decided.

While some tiki mugs were meant to be close to accurate renditions of actual tiki carvings, regardless of whether such tikis were Polynesian, many also were simply aesthetic estimations meant to evoke a tiki image to mainland American consumers who would not know the difference. Asian themed mugs grew in popularity as well, depicting monikers for drinks such as the Karate Punch or Sumo Flip. Some mugs also became eponymous with the drinks they were served with and vice versa (examples including the Suffering Bastard, scorpion bowl, and Fu Manchu).

The 1960s saw the ceramic craft market, such as Holland Mold Inc., release tiki mug molds for the hobbyist to make and customize at home. Vintage mugs, whether made by a professional manufacturer or by hobbyists, were once found in abundance on the shelves of junk shops in the 1980s and 1990s but became a sought-after item for those who were responsible for the revival of interest from tiki's heyday. Such historical mugs were first systemically catalogued in 2003 by Duke Carter in a self-published book that was considered important to the renaissance of tiki culture. Some tiki mugs have become quite valuable, with one estimation of a single mug's worth in 2019 for the Parksmith Fertility Goddess Decanter coming in at over $5,000.

== Sizes ==
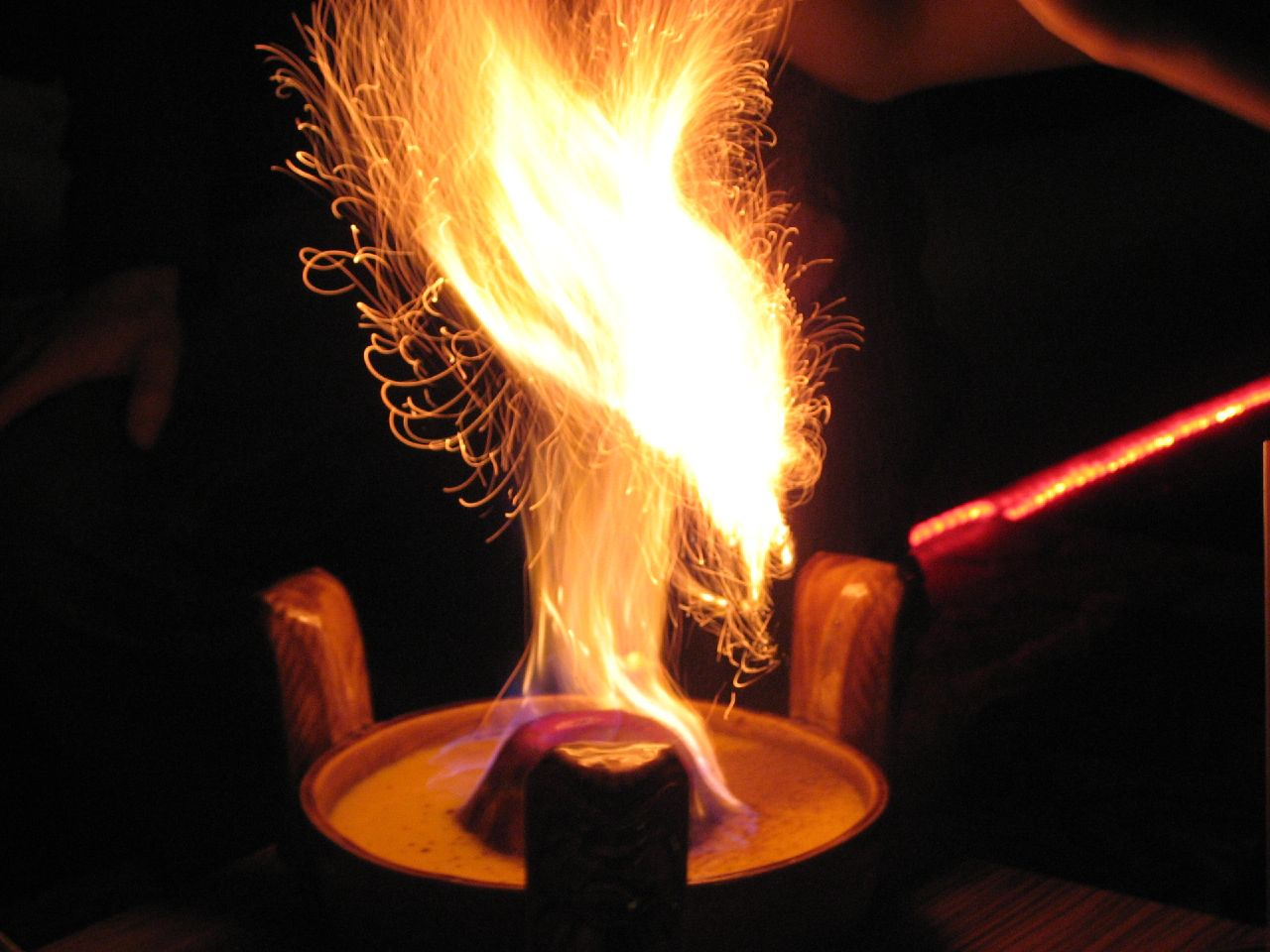
A volcano bowl

Although some mugs can be quite big, larger vessels are required for drinks meant to be shared. A scorpion bowl (also known as a kava bowl or tarantula bowl) is an oversized ceramic bowl meant for communal drinking through straws. A variation is the flaming volcano bowl, which has a raised crater reservoir. This reservoir is typically filled with a small amount of overproof rum (151 or 160) and carefully lit on fire.

Large shells or their ceramic counterparts are also sometimes used for communal drinks, such as in the Chin Tiki Special. The Mr. Bali Hai mug comes with a lid that has two holes in it for multiple straws and sharing.

== Manufacturers ==
Though hobbyists and ceramic artists, in a small capacity, have continued to make these mugs at home, larger manufacturers have mass-produced restaurant and bar promotional souvenirs. The two largest mass producers were Orchids of Hawaii and the Otagiri Mercantile Company (OMC). Other smaller manufacturers included Daga and Westwood, with most made in either Japan or Taiwan. While some were marked with manufacturers' stickers or etched with mold numbers, many were blank and were designs stolen from competitors. Some vintage knock-off mugs were of poor quality, while others were as crisp as the originals. There is speculation that in some cases the same manufacturer may have sold the same mug under two different company names.

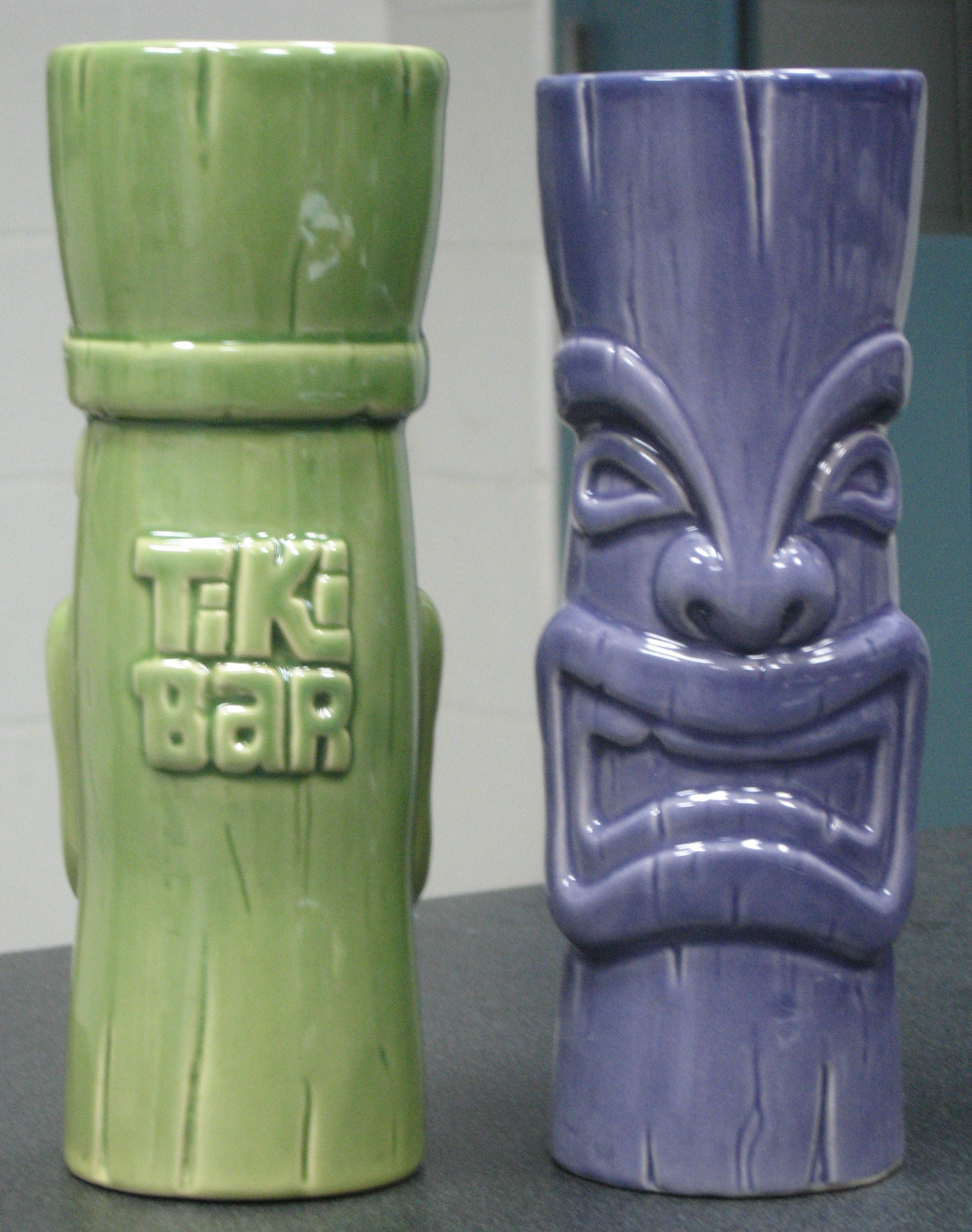
Mugs promoting the podcast Tiki Bar TV

The "tiki revival" of the 1990s and then 2008 onwards saw both the new production of historical styled mugs as well as variations that would have in the past seemed potentially out of place in traditional tiki bars due to advancements in glazing and other ceramic technologies. Custom tiki mugs started to be made as an advertising tool for use outside of establishments that would be considered strictly as tiki bars. Examples included a mug for the podcast Tiki Bar TV, as well as a complete set of Star Wars-themed tiki mugs.

== 21st-century variations ==
While the main Polynesian and nautical themes for traditional tiki mugs still remain, newer tiki mugs continue to stray much further from the standard formula that was used by Orchids of Hawaii and OMC.

Mugs depicting actual people or characters such as Don Ho, Jeff "Beachbum" Berry, Margaret Thatcher, Sven Kirsten, Donn the Beachcomber, and Magnum P.I. have been produced.

Tiki's historical basis with drinks such as the Zombie and Corpse Reviver, along with the use of early skull-shaped and shrunken-head mugs, became a catalyst for more overt "monster"-themed mugs.

In a similar fashion, Tiki's link to Atomic cocktails and drinks such as the Test Pilot, Astronaut and Space Needle eventually led to mugs in the shape of rocket ships and early science fiction robots with names such as "Tron the Beachcomber".

As aspects of tiki culture became more mainstream, virtually any uniquely styled ceramic mug began being labeled as a "tiki" mug, which saw some pushback among purists.

== Gallery ==
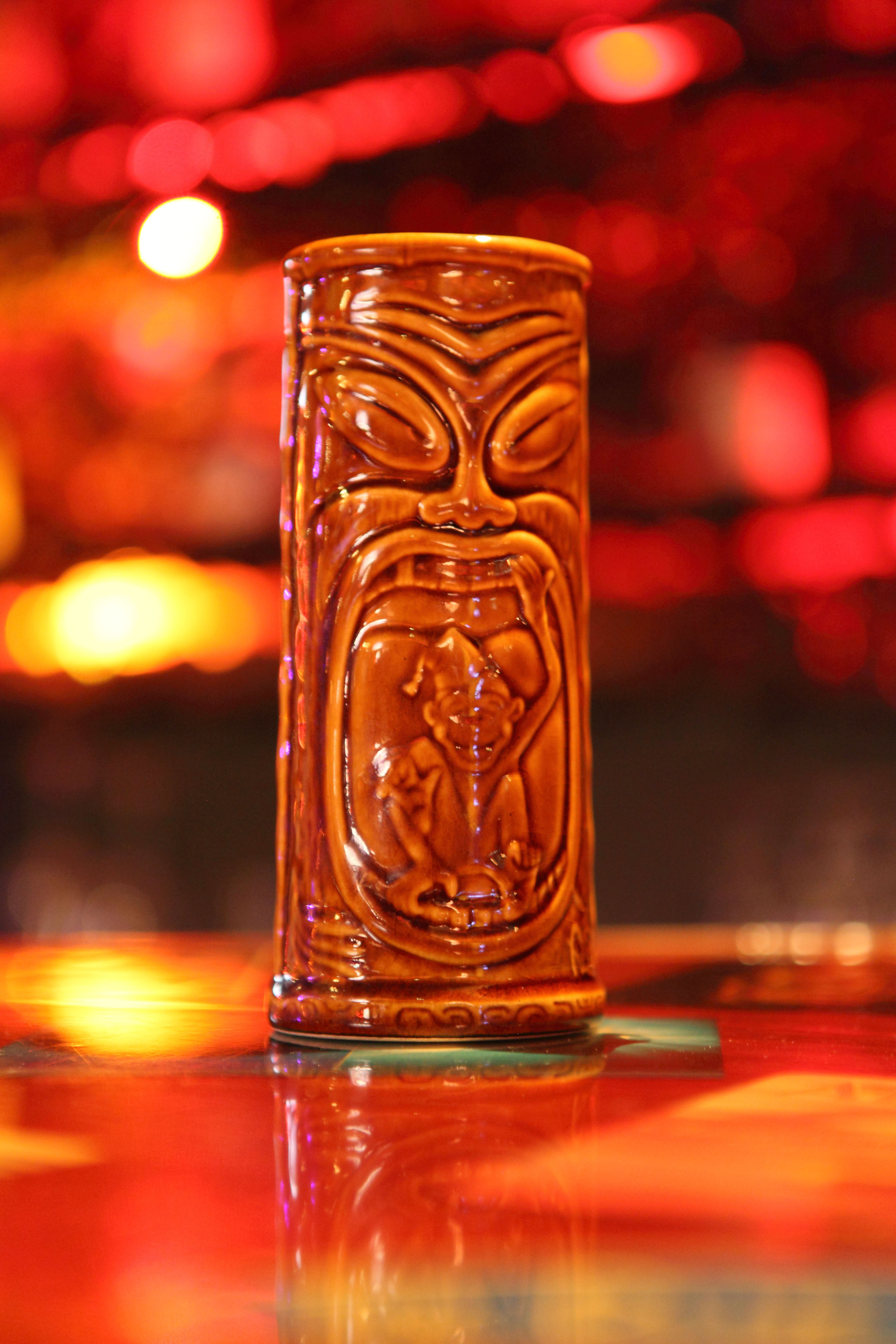

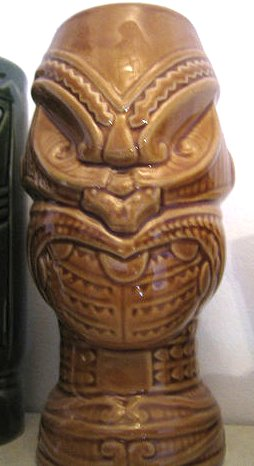

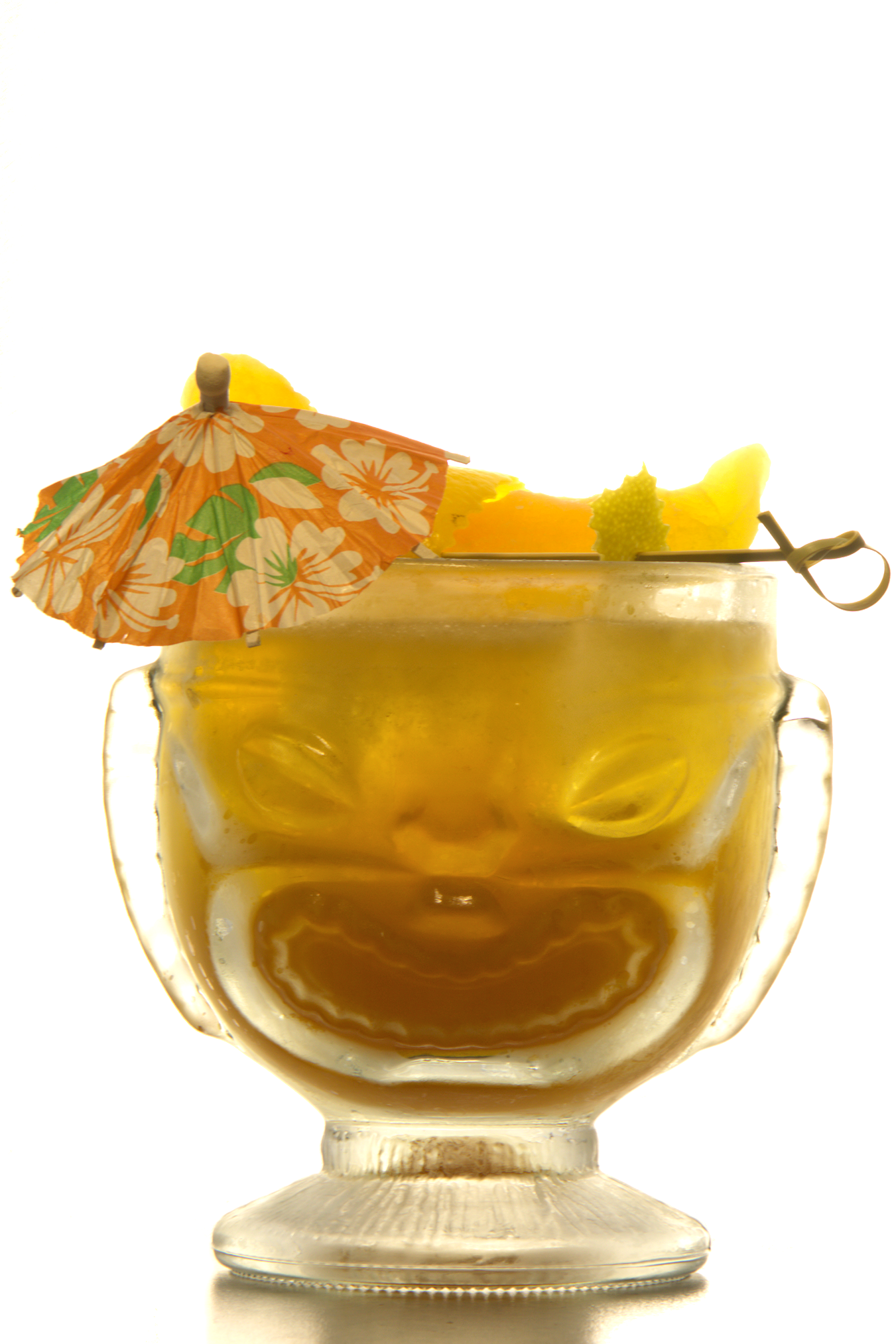

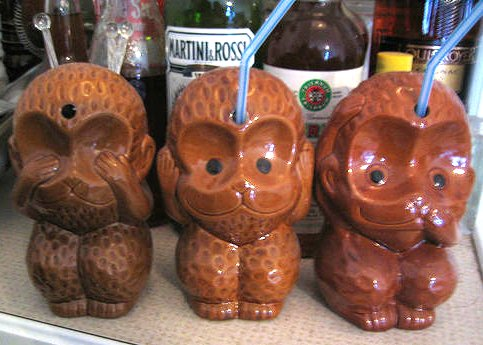

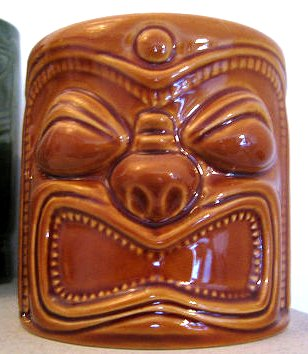

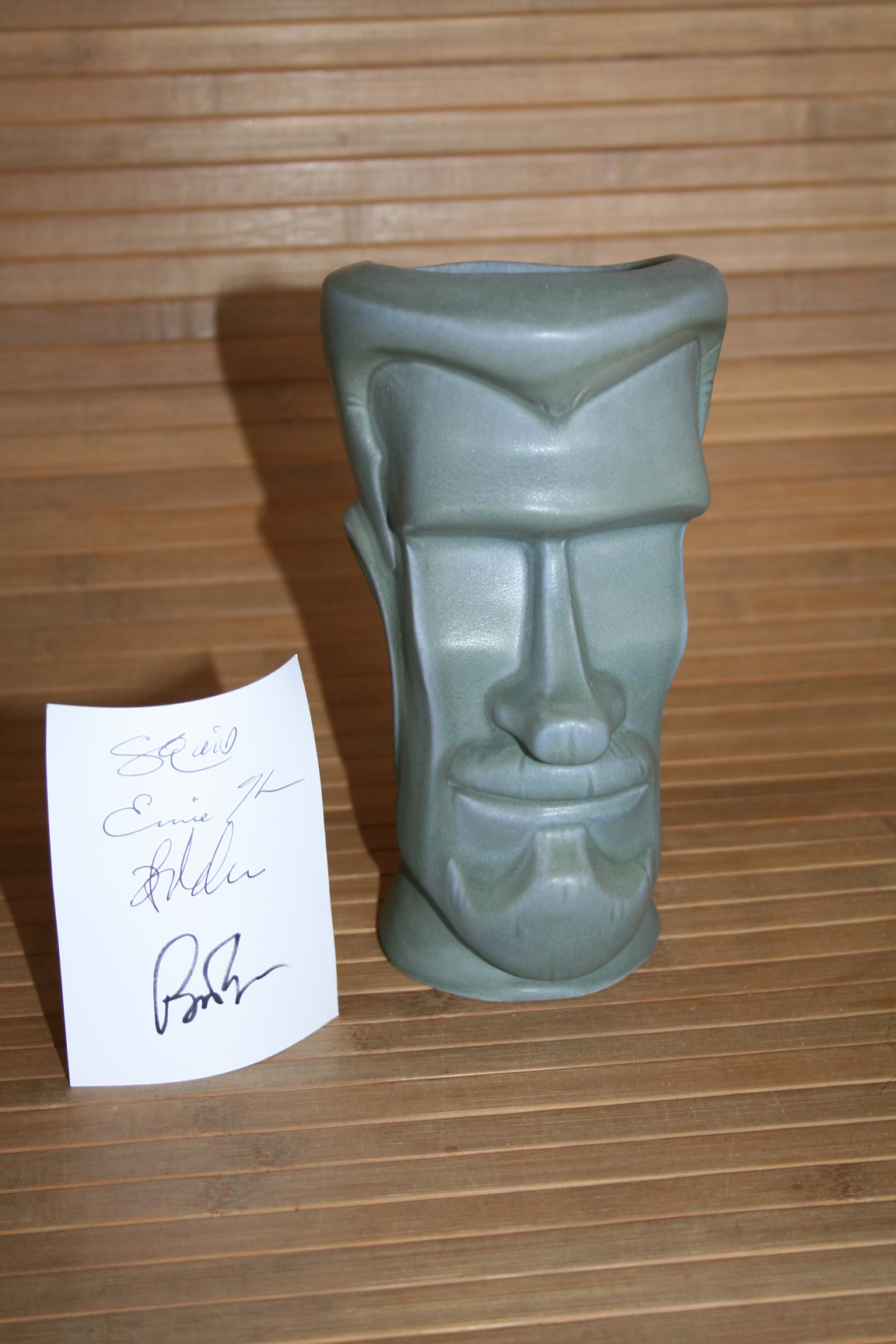

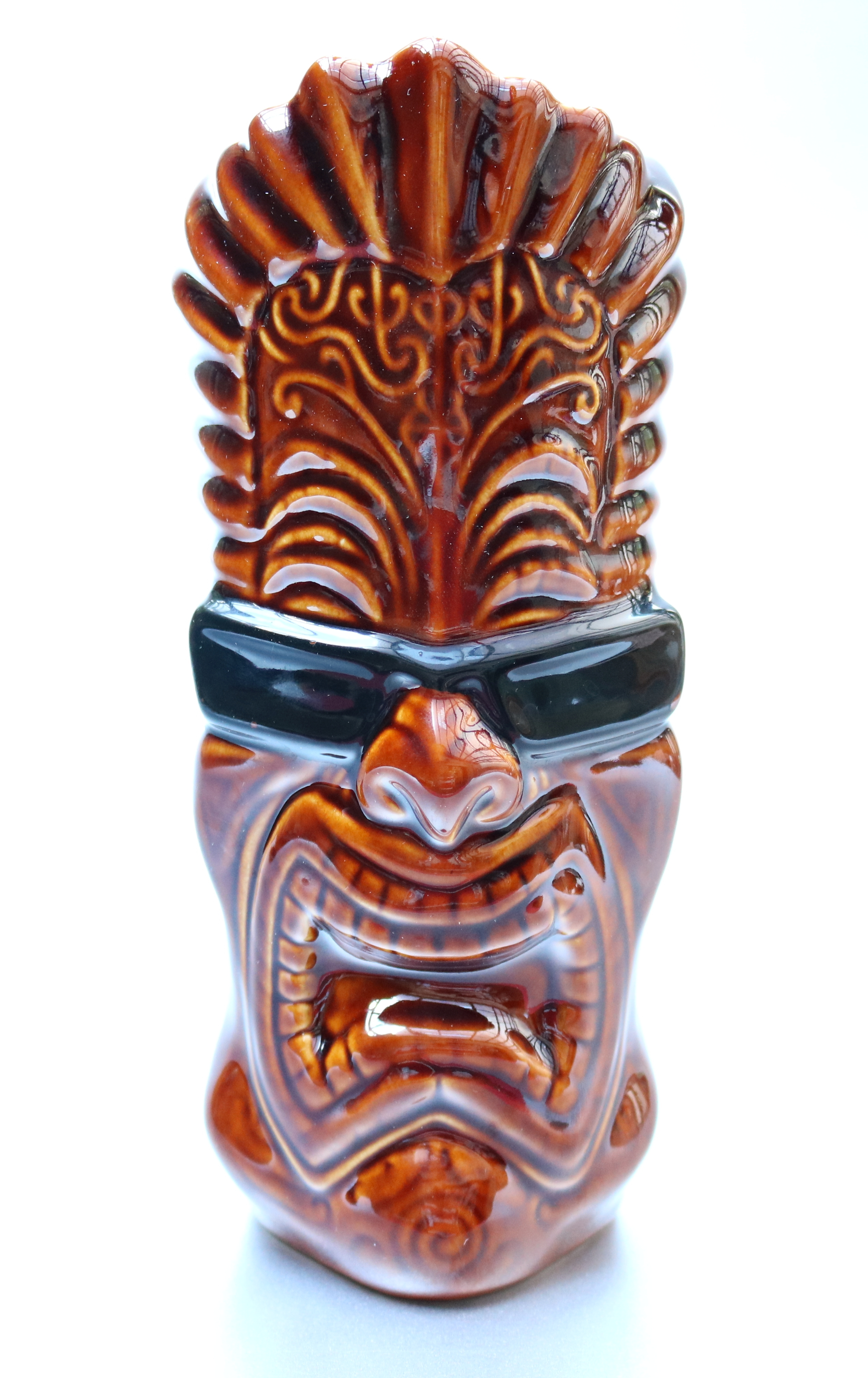

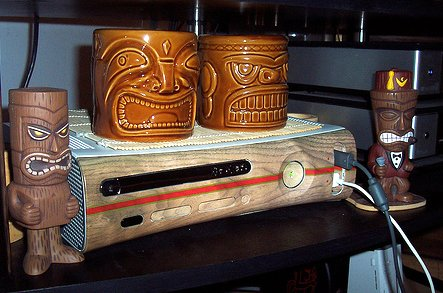

== See also ==
- List of glassware
- Exoticism
- Tiki culture
- Tiki bar
