= Volcano bowl =

Vessel for serving alcoholic beverages

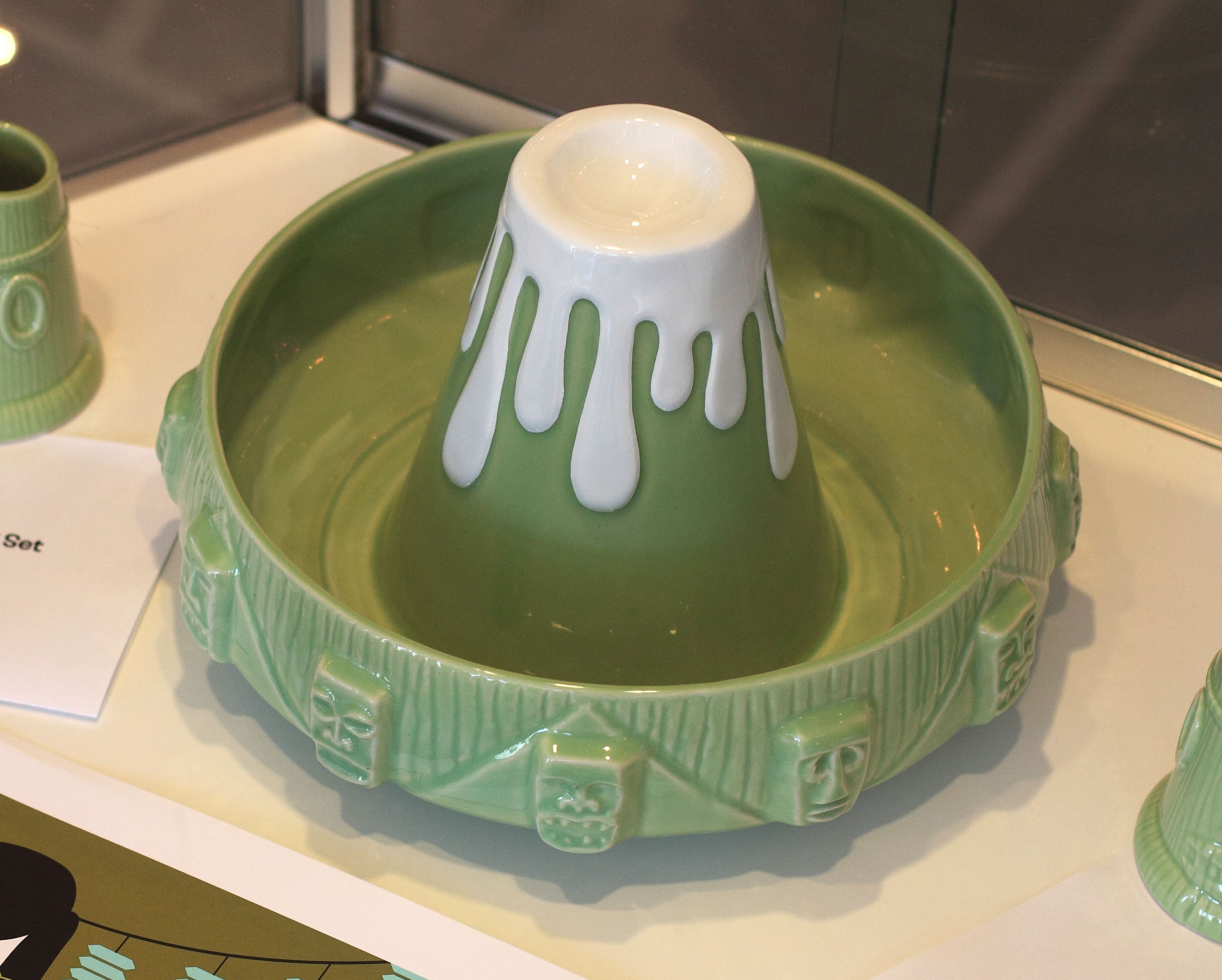
A volcano bowl

A volcano bowl is a piece of ceramic drinkware originally associated with mid-20th century American tiki bars and tropical-themed restaurants. Drinks served in volcano bowls are typically rum-based, mixed with tropical fruit juices and other liquors such as brandy, vodka, and triple sec, and garnished with fruit. The Flaming Volcano cocktail is especially associated with this drinkware.

== Background ==
Volcano bowls typically have a large capacity of 32 oz. or more, and are used to serve a communal beverage to a group of two or more friends who share the drink, often sipping simultaneously from the bowl through long, colorful straws. Volcano bowls are designed with a rising central hub feature formed and painted to resemble a crude volcano cone, giving the vessel a topological similarity to a Bundt pan. The central cone, in turn, is topped by a pit or "crater" which is intended to be filled with overproof rum or other flammable high-alcohol liquor. This "crater" liquor is ignited just before service, creating a festive, mildly volcanic ambience with its central blue flame. Meanwhile, the drink surrounds the "volcano cone" in a ring-shaped moat, like a pool of lava or an ocean surrounding a volcanic island.

The exterior surfaces of volcano bowls are usually decorated with painted or glazed-on tropical-themed images, such as hula dancers, palm trees, and island landscapes.
