= Thomas Tree =

American music producer, singer, songwriter, musician, entrepreneur

Thomas Tree Murray
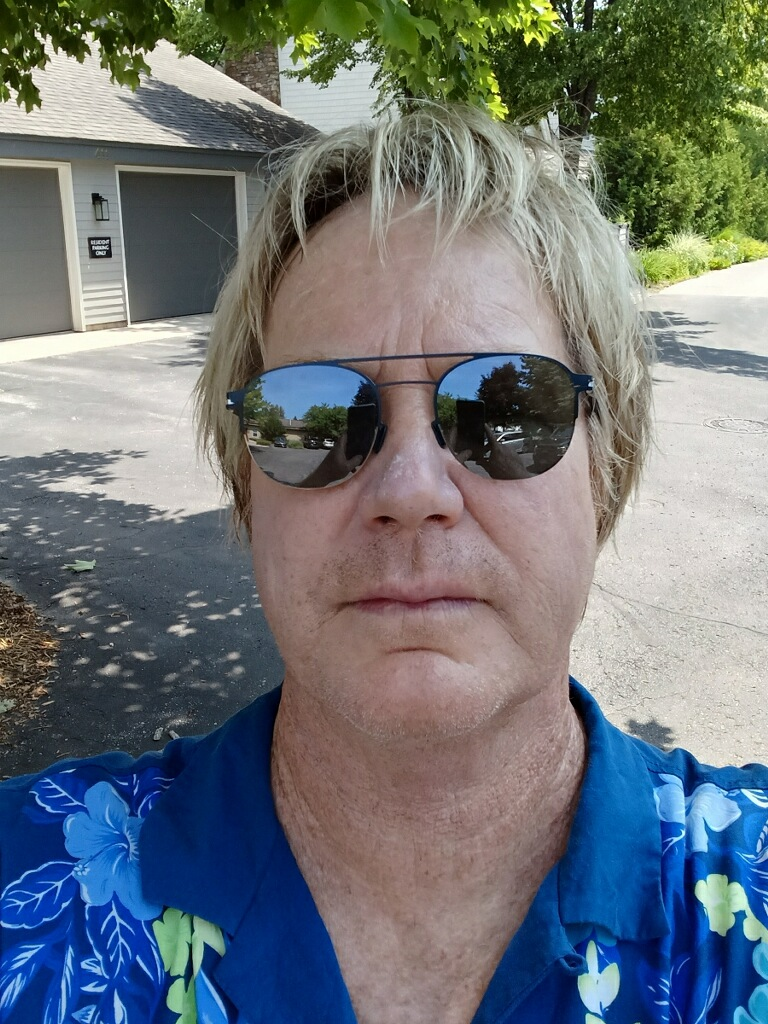
- Thomas Tree, 2023

Background information
- Also known as: Thomas Tree
- Born: Thomas McDonnell Sebastian Tree Murray; February 22, 1962 (age 64)
- Origin: Denver, Colorado, US
- Genres: Rock, alternative rock, electronic, jazz
- Occupations: Singer, songwriter, record producer
- Years active: 1981–present
- Labels: Lost Arts Records, Dr. Dream Records, Imago Records, Intercord Records, Cocktail Records, Everything OK Records

Thomas Tree Murray (born February 22, 1962) is an American songwriter, producer, singer and entrepreneur. He is best known as a founding member and lead vocalist of the alternative rock band Christy McCool. Murray is also the co-founder of Serendipity Pie, a music production and sound design team that he co-founded with longtime songwriting partner, Cory Joseph Coppage. Serendipity Pie has produced over 100 original songs to date. Tree and his wife, Jade Vaccarelli, have resided in Malibu, California, since 1994.

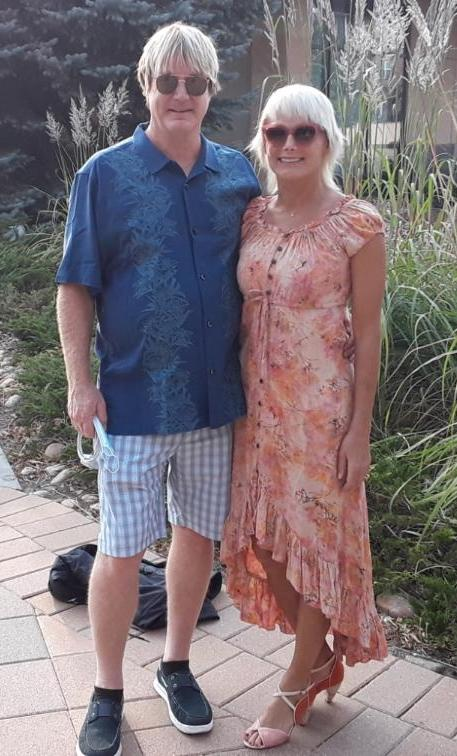
Thomas Tree and wife, Jade Vaccarelli, May 2021

== Personal life ==
Thomas Tree Murray was born Thomas McDonnell Sebastian Tree Murray to Colleen McDonnell and Paul V. Murray in Denver, Colorado. While studying Mass Media at the University of Colorado, Boulder in 1981, Murray began a songwriting collaboration with guitarist Cory Joseph Coppage. The partnership continues to this day and has produced 108 original songs, including "How Does She Do It So Quickly" from the soundtrack of the Academy-Award nominated film "Short Cuts", directed by Robert Altman. Robert Reed Altman, the son of "Short Cuts" director Robert Altman directed the video for the song, which also starred Altman's son Bobby, and Murray's wife, Jade.

Murray and Coppage were founding members of several projects during Murray's college days, including The Mile Highs and The Trees. The Trees were regulars at the Blue Note, a Boulder nightclub where they performed with the likes of Hüsker Dü, Mau Mau 55, Firehose, Aviators, Buddy Rich.

When Murray and Coppage moved their partnership to Hollywood in 1986, they renamed the project Bodhitrees. In addition to Murray and Coppage, Bodhitrees included Ronnie Nelson (Bass) James "Fabe" Fabery (Guitar) Michael King (Bass) Alexander Christopher (Guitar) and drummer Ron Rosing (formerly of Billy Corgan's first band "The Marked").

Murray was also hired by Rolling Stones producer Don Was to film the first 360-video with 'birds-eye' technology of a Rolling Stones concert at the MGM Grand Garden Arena in Las Vegas, Nevada on March 4, 2006. Murray (Tectonic Phlegm Publishing) has been a member of ASCAP since 1988.

== Career ==
=== Katie ===
Katie is a full-length album recorded by Murray and Coppage at Faith Tape Ministries in Denver, Colorado, and it was the first album by the duo under the name Bodhitrees. A Los Angeles Times review of the album described the duo’s sound as “a bizarre blend of folk, electro-experimentation, Brit-pop, rap, Monty Python accents, Falco smartness, Donovan rock and music hall silliness” and “a whimsical, strangely disturbing oddity." The album was successful on American college radio stations and reached #2 on the independent Los Angeles radio station, KXLU.

The album was engineered and mixed by Michael Pfeiffer. Pfeiffer would go on to work with Murray and Coppage on several other studio albums. Katie was released on Lost Arts records in 1987, and published under TMM Publishing and CJC Publishing.

=== Christy McCool ===
In September 1988, Tree formed the alternative-rock band Christy McCool with Neil McAnally, Kat Robinson and Terrence Lee Henry. All members of the band were tenants of the same apartment building in Hollywood, CA. At this time, another tenant in the building took a dangerous amount of prescription medication and lit her bed, and room, on fire. Tree, who was also manager of the building, was forced to evict the tenant, but the group decided to name their newly formed band after her.

Christy McCool's first L.A. performance was at Gazzarri's Music Hall (now The Key Club) on the Sunset Strip. In late 1989, the band released their debut album "Lovelier than the Queen of England" and toured the Western and Southern U.S., as well as parts of Europe. During this time, they also performed with, or were on compilation recordings with bands like X, L7, Gwar, Pigmy Love Circus, Faith No More, 45 Grave, Stan Red Fox, Swamp Zombies, Red Hot Chili Peppers and Fishbone among others.

In 1990, Christy McCool was included on Tantrum, a compilation album, for their cover of The Doors' song “Peace Frog”. Tantrum was released under Cocktail Records, with Decca Records providing distribution, and featured other up-and-coming Los Angeles-based bands including Haunted Garage, Pigmy Love Circus, Celebrity Skin, and Green Jellÿ.

In 1991, Intercord Records released a compilation CD entitled “Funky Metal” which included the song “Mo Fo” by Christy McCool, as well as songs by other alternative acts including Faith No More, Red Hot Chili Peppers and Fishbone. Christy McCool’s final line-up was made up of Tree on vocals, Neil McAnally on bass, Jason D on guitar and Tom Wenzel on drums.

=== Calling Colleen ===
Calling Colleen is a full-length LP written by Murray and Coppage. The album is a blend of pop and alternative-rock, with lyrical themes that both celebrated and satirized the everyday lives of working-class Americans.

Calling Colleen was recorded at Faith Tape Ministries in Denver, Colorado and was engineered by Michael Pfeiffer. It was originally released on Everything OK Records on August 23, 1993, and published under TMM Publishing and CJC Publishing. Calling Colleen was re-released on September 30, 2022.

=== Subsonic Sonar ===
In 2001, Tree partnered with Mazen Daouk and Sound Engineer / Co-Producer and Professor of Sound Design at the University of South Carolina, Walter Clissen to form the experimental electronic-music project, Subsonic Sonar. After a decade of development, they released “Emerald Green Vortex” in 2011. The album is a mix of Trip hop and electronic ambience and opera that they refer to as "Triphopera".

The operatic vocals by Van Oosterwijk were recorded at Studio Excelsior in the Netherlands, while Tree, Daouk and Clissen recorded the music at Studio Zen in Venice, California. Poetry and lyrics were written and performed by Jade Vaccarelli and Thomas Tree.

All songs on the album were mixed by Walter Clissen, who also contributed sound design. Emerald Green Vortex was released on Everything OK Records and published under TMM Publishing, and the album was dedicated to the memory of Paul V. Murray Jr.

=== Human Zoo ===
In the summer of 2018, Murray and Coppage reunited to write and record songs under the name Human Zoo, and on March 17, 2020, the self-titled Human Zoo LP was released. Unlike the satirical alt-pop Murray and Coppage had produced before, Human Zoo has a darker sound, featuring elements like primal percussion and heavy guitar feedback. The album was recorded at Faith Tape Ministries in Denver, Colorado and was engineered and mixed by Michael Pfeiffer. All songs were written, arranged, performed, and produced by Murray and Coppage. The album also features Alexander Christopher on lead guitar and Michael King on bass guitar. Human Zoo was released on Everything OK Records and published under TMM Publishing and CJC Publishing.

=== Fancy Pants Orchestra ===
In the spring of 2012, Murray and Coppage founded a jazz-based project called Fancy Pants Orchestra. They recruited keyboardist and band leader Geoff Stradling for the recordings, as well as nine studio musicians from the LA Jazz Society. The songs were recorded at Malibu Sound Studios, and all nine songs on the album were sung in both English and Spanish languages by Baby Cupcake (English versions) and Fernanda Karolys (Spanish versions). After production on the album wrapped, a 4 song EP was released on July 7, 2017, titled Secrets and Surprises!, with the full length LP, Feeling Good!, released on May 31, 2022. Feeling Good! features music influenced by American music of the 1940’s and 1950’s, like jazz and big band, and blends it with elements of Latin music, including Samba and Tango. The album was engineered by Sebastian Haimerl and mixed by Walter Clissen. Feeling Good! was released on Everything OK Records and published under TMM Publishing and CJC Publishing. Feeling Good! is dedicated to the memory of Chase Vaccarelli, Zen Marmor, and Lance Vaccarelli.

=== Your High ===
Your High is the seventh, full-length album by Murray and his fifth album collaborating with Coppage. The album has a Christmas theme and features a children’s choir, complex horn and piano arrangements and varied cultural references. The lead single, “Santa’s Watching Johnny B. Goode”, was released on November 22, 2022, and features Murray’s vocals accompanied by a children’s choir. Your High, the full album, is scheduled for release on October 31, 2023, on Everything OK Records, with publishing under TMM Publishing and CJC Publishing. The album was recorded at Faith Tape Ministries in Denver, Colorado. It was engineered and mixed by Michael Pfeiffer, and features Father Anthony Fidel on piano.

=== Jacks Off ===
Jacks Off is an EP by Christy McCool that was released through Everything OK Records on May 17, 2023. It features Thomas Tree Murray on vocals, Neil McAnally on bass, Jason Dobbertin on guitar and Tom Wenzel on drums. Recorded at Journey Studios in Oakland, California, it was engineered by Michael Rosen and the Executive Producer was David Hayes, who is also the founder of Doctor Dream Records. The songs (in order) are: Betty Boops, Jacks Off, Midwestern Pop, Pack Your Own Lunch and Villa de Marz. All songs were written, arranged and produced by Thomas Tree Murray and Neil McAnally, except Midwestern Pop, which was written and arranged by Thomas Tree Murray and Cory Joseph Coppage.

== Discography ==
The Trees

- I Work With My Live-In Girlfriend (single) – Samsara Records (1984)
- Some Girls (single) – Samsara Records (1982)

Bodhitrees

- Katie – Lost Arts Records (1987)
- Calling Colleen – Lost Arts Records (1993)

Christy McCool

- Lovelier than the Queen of England – Dr. Dream Records (1989)
- Tantrum (compilation) – Decco Records (1990)
- Funky Metal (compilation) Mo Fo – Intercord Records (1991)
- Jacks Off (E.P.) — Everything OK Records (2023)

Thomas Tree & Cory Joseph Coppage

- Short Cuts (soundtrack) So Quickly – Imago Records (1993)
- Your High — Everything OK Records (2023)

Subsonic Sonar

- Irrational Impulse (re-mix, single) – Imago Records (2009)
- Emerald Green Vortex – Enlighten Records (2011)
- Underwater Ballerina — (March 21, 2021)

Fancy Pants Orchestra

- 1920's Roaring Orchestra & Big Band Sound (English, Spanish, and Instrumental versions) – Entitled Secrets and Surprizes! (2018)
- Mushrooms (single from upcoming 2022 album: Feeling Good) - Everything OK Records (September, 2021)
- Yankee Doodle Parade (single from upcoming 2022 album: Feeling Good) - Everything OK Records (September, 2021)
- Mr. Confidential (single from upcoming 2022 album: Feeling Good) - Everything OK Records (September, 2021)
- Fancy Pants Orchestra - Feeling Good (Nine Songs in English and Spanish) - Everything OK Records (May 31, 2022)
- Secrets and Surprises! — Everything OK Records (2017)

Human Zoo

- Human Zoo (LP) — Everything OK Records (2020)

== Videography ==
The Trees

- “Some Girls” (1982) – starring Gretchen Murray written by Thomas Tree and CJC – Directed by Paul Barrera

Christy McCool

- “Neals Deal With Meals” (1990) – directed by Vincent Prect, written by Thomas Tree and CJC
- “Old Man Bagman” (1991) written by Thomas Tree and CJC – directed by Robert Reed Altman, (stars Albert Crane IV and is dedicated to his memory)

Thomas Tree & Cory Joseph Coppage

- “So Quickly” (1993) – starring Jade Vaccarelli, directed by Robert Reed Altman
