= Swamp Zombies =

Indie rock band from Irvine, California, USA

- Origin: Orange, California, USA
- Genre: Indie rock
- Label: Doctor Dream Records

Swamp Zombies was an indie rock band formed during the 1980s in California (Irvine, CA). One of Doctor Dream Records most popular bands, the Swamp Zombies released five albums for the label. The core of their sound blended folk music and punk music with heavy doses of calypso and other influences thrown into the mix. The video for the song "Creeps" (Scratch and Sniff Car Crash) received airplay on MTV's 120 Minutes.

Swamp Zombies 1989 Pyramid Club NYC

== Brief history ==
The band was initially formed in 1985 in Irvine, CA, by two pairs of brothers, Josh and Travis Agle, and Steve and Mike Jacobs. Mike played percussion (congas) on the first single, Fire and Dogs, then was replaced by Gary McNiece, who also performed on the first album. After Gary left, a session musician laid down percussion tracks for their second album until Dave Warren stepped in to fill the void. After the third album Travis left the group and was replaced on the next album by t-ray Vogelzang, who came from a band called The Final Tourguides and also the thrash-a-bash art punk band, The Silly Millions. After t-ray departed for San Francisco, the band continued as a three piece with Travis making appearances at the odd live show in their later years. The most recent Swamp Zombies gig appears to have taken place in August 1997. Members of the Swamp Zombies found themselves in splinter and spinoff bands such as The Tiki Tones, The Huntington Cads, The Calypso Cats, Tombstone Bullets, and Trucker Up.

== Lineup ==
- Steve "Steeve" Jacobs 1985-1997 - bass guitar, nose flute, dulcimer, double bass, violin, tuba, farfisa, jaw harp and vocals
- Travis Agle - 1985–1990, 1996-1997 - guitar & vocals, harmonica, slide guitar, some percussion
- "T. Ray Vogelzang" - 1990-1992 - guitar & vocals, accordion
- Josh "Shag" Agle - 1985-1997 - guitar, mandolin, banjo, & vocals. Also the artist for the cover art.
- Smilin' Dave Warren (full name David Warren Williams) - 1988-1997- percussion, drums, saxophone, & vocals
- Gary McNiece 1987-1988 - percussion & vocals
- Mike Jacobs 1985-1987 - percussion, trombone, & vocals

Stand-Ins:

- Jeff Beals - guitar
- Jeff Fairbanks - touring percussionist

== Discography ==
Singles:

- Fire & Dogs b/w H.B. (1985)
- Creeps b/w California/I Love You, Etc. (1990)
- Matador b/w Temecula (1994)
- The Fence Builder (2020 [recorded 1992] - online release)

- Additional photos

LPs:

- Chicken Vulture Crow (1987)
- Fink (1989)
- Scratch and Sniff Car Crash (1990)
- A Frenzy of Music and Action! (1992)
- Spunk! (1993)

Songs on Compilations:

- Mr. Heatmiser on the Doctor Dream White Christmas Album (1991)
- Santa Claus Conquers the Martians on the Santa/Satan: One and the Same? album (1993)
- Creeps, Desolation Girl on Doctor Dream Presents III Promo Collection (1990)
