= Andy Prieboy =

American musician, songwriter, and author

Andy Prieboy (born April 17, 1955) is an American musician, songwriter, and author. He was lead singer of the band Wall of Voodoo from 1983 to 1988. Later, he produced solo albums, musicals, and a novel.

== Life and career ==
Prieboy was born in Los Angeles and raised in East Chicago, Indiana. Early in his career, he was in the San Francisco art band Eye Protection, which had one track on the compilation Rising Stars of San Francisco: "Take Her Where The Boys Are". They also recorded a 7-inch single called "Elroy Jetson" with a b-side of "Go Go Girl" on Eleph Records.

In 1983, he replaced Stan Ridgway as lead vocalist of Wall of Voodoo. Seven Days in Sammystown was the first Wall of Voodoo album to feature Prieboy, which was followed by Happy Planet, and finally The Ugly Americans in Australia (a live album recorded to fulfill their recording obligations to IRS Records).

His first Wall of Voodoo single "Far Side of Crazy" is featured in the film Head Office. His demo for the song "Man Talk", which would finally appear on the album ...Upon My Wicked Son, was featured in the early Brad Pitt film Cutting Class as well as other unreleased Wall of Voodoo demos. These same demos appeared in the film C.H.U.D. II: Bud the C.H.U.D.. He also appears in the film Blood and Concrete along with a few of his original songs (in that movie, Jennifer Beals sings his song, "One Girl in a Million").

After leaving Wall of Voodoo, Prieboy signed with MCA Music Publishing as a songwriter and went to work on new material for his first solo record ...Upon My Wicked Son, which featured the song "Tomorrow Wendy," about a woman dying of AIDS. The song featured a duet with Johnette Napolitano, whose band Concrete Blonde also recorded the song and released it on their album Bloodletting the same year. The music video was directed by Thomas Mignone. MTV initially rejected the song's lyrical content and tone but Prieboy and Mignone decided to feature the decaying cities of Hammond and Gary in Indiana as the "Wendy" character and the video received Buzz Bin status at MTV. The song was also covered by the industrial project System Syn in early 2000s. Linda Ronstadt and Emmylou Harris covered his song "Loving the Highway Man" from the same album. Prieboy then released an EP called Montezuma Was a Man of Faith which featured a country rendition of "Whole Lotta Love" by Led Zeppelin, featuring an uncredited Johnette Napolitano from Concrete Blonde. Prieboy's second solo album was entitled Sins of Our Fathers.

In the mid- to late-'90s, Prieboy played shows at the Los Angeles club Largo with Rita D'Albert where they worked on an ongoing musical, White Trash Wins Lotto; a Gilbert and Sullivan-esque treatment of the rise and fall of an Axl Rose-like character. It was also performed at the Roxy Theatre on the Sunset Strip for three sold out weekend-long engagements as well as two sold out weekends at New York City's PS 122. Prieboy and crew also performed a medley from White Trash on the Conan O'Brien show.

Prieboy is also the co-author with Merrill Markoe of the novel The Psycho Ex Game, based on his song "Psycho Ex". Markoe and Prieboy have lived together since 2004.

He released several songs via his website for online purchase. In 2012 Prieboy released the four-song downloadable EP Every Lady Gets A Song, featuring accompaniment by former Dils bassist Tony Kinman and Devo drummer David Kendrick.

On December 20, 2016, he released his lost album Virtue Triumphs. The album was left unfinished and abandoned in 1992; it was meant to be the follow-up to his first solo work, ...Upon My Wicked Son. A corporate regime change ultimately swept him out, and the album stayed behind. This was his first body of work that was not beholden to Wall of Voodoo.

== Discography ==
=== Studio albums ===
Year	Title	Label
1990	...Upon My Wicked Son	Doctor Dream Records
1995	Sins of Our Fathers	Doctor Dream Records
2016	Virtue Triumphs: The Lost and Unfinished Album 1990 - 1992 Vol. 1	Andy Prieboy
2022	One and One Make Three	Andy Prieboy

=== EPs ===
Year	Title	Label
1991	Montezuma Was a Man of Faith	Hot Mustard Records/Doctor Dream Records
2010	The Questionable Profits of Pure Novelty	Andy Prieboy Music
2010	Don't Tell That Guy Anything (Sketchbook Volume 1)	Andy Prieboy Music
2011	Every Lady Gets a Song	Andy Prieboy Music
2019	Every Night of My Life	Andy Prieboy

=== Singles ===
Date	Title	Label
1990	"Tomorrow Wendy"	Doctor Dream Records
2008	"Shine"	Andy Prieboy Music
2008	"Shine 2"	Andy Prieboy Music
2012-10-05	"The Death of New Wave"	Malibu Ghraib Recordings
2013-04-08	"My Happy Ending"	Andy Prieboy
2013-04-24	"Someday"	Malibu Ghraib Recordings
2013-05-17	"Wasn't That a Time?"	Malibu Ghraib Recordings
2013-07-02	"A Thousand Gorgeous Lies"	Malibu Ghraib Recordings
2013-07-11	"Donny and Goliath"	Malibu Ghraib Recordings
2013-07-27	"Your Side of Town"	Malibu Ghraib Recordings
2015-11-21	"How High My High"	Andy Prieboy
2015-12-10	"A Lot More Love"	Andy Prieboy
2016-03-10	"Too Late for Plans"	Andy Prieboy
2016-04-22	"Tomorrow Wendy" (Day One Basic Vocal Track 1989) [feat. Johnette Napolitano & Scott Thunes]	Andy Prieboy
2016-09-20	"Build a Better Garden" (Unedited Version)	Andy Prieboy
2016-09-21	"Footnotes"	Andy Prieboy
2016-10-06	"It's Not a Negative No"	Andy Prieboy
2017-04-06	"Heaven or Anaheim"	Andy Prieboy
2019-12-17	"All of Your Hard Times"	Andy Prieboy
2019-12-18	"That Way Again"	Andy Prieboy
