= Shag (artist) =

American artist

- Agle in 2004
- Born: Joshua S. Agle; August 31, 1962 (age 64); Sierra Madre, California, U.S.
- Education: California State University, Long Beach
- Known for: Painting, illustration
- Movement: Mid-century modern
- Spouse: Glendele Way (m. 1991)
- Children: 2

Josh Agle (born August 31, 1962) is an American artist, better known by the nickname Shag.

== Early life and education ==
Josh Agle was born August 31, 1962, the first of nine children in Sierra Madre, California. He spent his early childhood in Hawaii, and later moved with his family to Los Angeles. While Agle was attending high school, his family moved to Utah. In the mid-1980s, he returned to California, to study economics and architecture at California State University, Long Beach.

== Career ==
While at CSULB, Agle changed his major to graphic design and achieved his first successes as an illustrator while in college, with work for the magazines Forbes, Time and Entertainment Weekly. Also, he designed record covers for bands in the area. When he designed a cover for his own band, the Swamp Zombies, he first used the pseudonym Shag, composed of the last two letters of his first name and the first two letters of his surname, so as not to make it look as if the cover artist was merely a band member, but that the band was successful enough to hire a graphic designer.

In 1995, Agle was asked by Otto von Stroheim to contribute a painting to an exhibition. This picture quickly sold for $200 and caught the attention of the influential gallery owner Billy Shire. Agle was given the opportunity to present a series of other works in a 1996 tiki-themed art show at Shire's La Luz de Jesus Gallery in Hollywood. All of the pictures sold immediately and Shire was so excited that he organized an exhibition for Agle's works which was very well attended and which also quickly sold out.

Since then, Agle has had more exhibitions at various galleries in the United States, Japan, Australia and Europe. He had his first solo gallery exhibition in 1997, and his first New York gallery show in 2002. In 2010, he opened a "SHAG Store" in Palm Springs, which sells merchandise depicting Agle's works. A second Shag Store was opened in Hollywood in October 2015 (closed in 2020) and a Shag store has since opened in Las Vegas in early 2022, in the Palms Casino Resort. He is also known for designing Tiki mugs.

Shag has designed projects for The Walt Disney Company and the Venetian Resort Hotel Casino in Las Vegas, as well as a 100-foot-long mural in the Georgia Aquarium.

== Personal life ==
Josh Agle lives with his wife and their two children in Orange County, California.

== Selected books ==
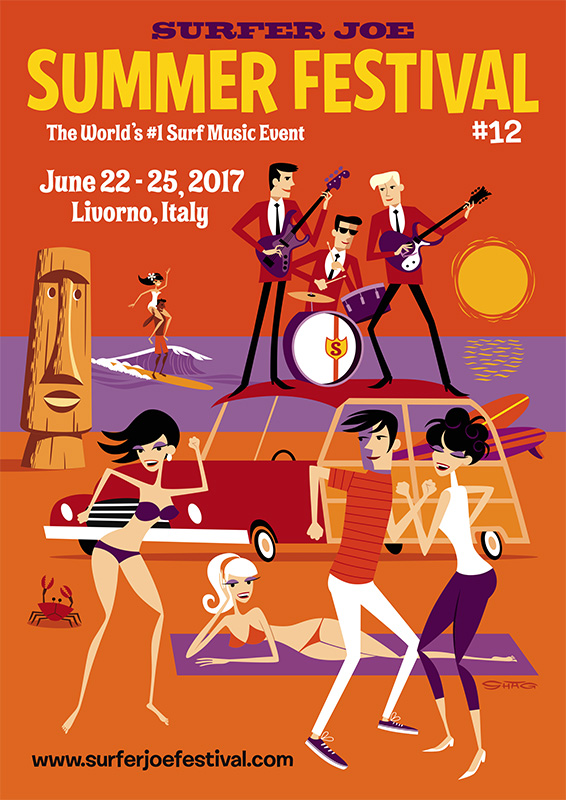
Poster for the 2017 Surfer Joe Summer Festival, featuring Shag's distinctive artwork

- Supersonic Swingers. Outre Gallery Press. 2000. ISBN 978-0957768413.
- Bottomless Cocktail. La Luz de Jesus Press. 2000. ISBN 978-0867195286.
- Shag Party. Surrey Books. 2001. ISBN 978-1572840478.
- Around the World in 80 Drinks. Surrey Books. 2003. ISBN 978-1572840508.
- Shag's Zodiac. Surrey Books. 2004. ISBN 978-1572840676.
- Shag: The Art of Josh Agle. Chronicle Books. 2005. ISBN 978-0811850964.
- Shag Ltd: Fine Art Limited Editions. Last Gasp. 2005. ISBN 978-0867196467.
- Shag A to Z: A Children's Book Unsuitable for Children. Fantagraphics Books. 2008. ISBN 978-1560978855.
- Autumn's Come Undone. Baby Tattoo Books. 2009. ISBN 978-0979330735.
- Shag: The Complete Works. AMMO Books LLC. 2016. ISBN 978-1623260941.

== Museum exhibitions and collections ==
- 2010 - Art Shack, Laguna Art Museum, Laguna Beach, California
- 2009 - Urban Superstars, Naples Museum of Modern Art, Naples, Italy
- 2008 - Beyond Baby Tattooville, Riverside Art Museum, Riverside, California
- 2008 - In The Land of Retinal Delights, Laguna Art Museum, Laguna Beach, California
- 2007 - The Flesh Is Willing: New Work by Shag, Laguna Art Museum, Laguna Beach, California
- 2007 - Rome Is Burning, Haas Fine Arts Center, Eau Claire, Wisconsin
- 2005 - Pop Surrealism, Sangre De Cristo Art Center, Pueblo, Colorado
- 2005 - Paradirama, Musee International des Arts Modestes, Sète, France
- 2002 - The Sophisticated Misfit: Fifteen Years of Shag, Brea Museum, Brea, California
- 2000 - Lowbrow Art: Up From The Underground, Art and Culture Center of Hollywood, Hollywood, Florida

== See also ==
- Lowbrow (art movement)
