= Doctor Dream Records =

Independent record label

- Founded: 1982
- Founder: Dave Hayes
- Defunct: 1997
- Status: Defunct
- Genre: Punk, alternative rock, comedy, heavy metal
- Country of origin: U.S.
- Location: Orange, California

Doctor Dream Records was an independent record label founded in 1982 by Dave Hayes that originated from Orange, California. During its time as an independent the company released over 100 records in punk rock, alternative rock, comedy, and heavy metal music. The company logo was designed by Josh Agle. Doctor Dream Records was sold to Mercury/PolyGram in 1997.

== Roster ==
- The Cadillac Tramps
- Christy McCool
- The Grabbers
- D.I.
- Manic Hispanic
- Aversion
- Bitch Funky Sex Machine
- Fifty Lashes
- Cisco Poison
- Dash Rip Rock
- Drance
- Paul Kelly and the Messengers
- Joyride
- Shig & Buzz
- The Texas Instruments
- Tiny Lights
- The Black Watch
- Andy Prieboy
- Jerry Giddens
- Welt
- Screaming Bloody Mary's
- Swamp Zombies
- Don't Mean Maybe
- Monster Voodoo Machine
- Zebrahead
- The Joneses
- Knockout
- Human Therapy
- Eggplant
- Imagining Yellow Suns
- Ann Dejarnet
- El Grupo Sexo
- National People's Gang
- Bob's Your Uncle
- Food For Feet
- The Cripples
- Trouble Dolls

== See also ==
- List of record labels
