= Recollection: The Best of Concrete Blonde =

Compilation album by Concrete Blonde
- Released: February 20, 1996
- Genre: Alternative rock
- Length: 75:28
- Label: I.R.S. Records

Concrete Blonde chronology
Still in Hollywood (1994)	Recollection: The Best of Concrete Blonde (1996)	Concrete Blonde y Los Illegals (1997)

Professional ratings
Review scores
Source	Rating
AllMusic	4.5/5 stars

Recollection: The Best of Concrete Blonde is a best-of collection by alternative rock band Concrete Blonde, released in 1996.

== Critical reception ==
Entertainment Weekly wrote that "Johnette Napolitano’s robust vocal delivery (a slightly bronchial Chrissie Hynde) makes everything here sound like party music for pale people who own a lot of black clothes."

== Track listing ==
No.	Title	Writer(s)	Original album	Length
1.	"God Is a Bullet"	James Mankey, Johnette Napolitano	Free	4:24
2.	"Tomorrow, Wendy"	Andy Prieboy	Bloodletting	5:05
3.	"Joey"	Napolitano	Bloodletting	4:07
4.	"Scene of a Perfect Crime"	Mankey, Napolitano	Free	4:40
5.	"Someday?"	Napolitano	Walking in London	3:30
6.	"Ghost of a Texas Ladies' Man"	Napolitano	Walking in London	3:50
7.	"Dance Along the Edge"	Napolitano	Concrete Blonde	5:29
8.	"Bloodletting (The Vampire Song)" (Short Version)	Napolitano	Original version from Bloodletting	4:28
9.	"Happy Birthday"	Mankey, Napolitano	Free	2:19
10.	"Caroline"	Napolitano	Bloodletting	5:30
11.	"Cold Part of Town"	Napolitano	Concrete Blonde	3:10
12.	"Walking in London" (Edit)	Napolitano	Original version from Walking in London	3:59
13.	"Heal It Up"	Napolitano	Mexican Moon	4:29
14.	"Everybody Knows"	Leonard Cohen, Sharon Robinson	Pump Up the Volume OST	4:42
15.	"True"	Mankey, Napolitano	Concrete Blonde	2:59
16.	"Mexican Moon"	Napolitano	Mexican Moon	5:03
17.	"Still in Hollywood"	Napolitano	Concrete Blonde	3:42
18.	"Mercedes Benz" (Live)	Janis Joplin, Michael McClure, Bob Neuwirth	Previously unreleased	3:00

== Personnel ==
- Johnette Napolitano - vocals, bass
