= The Essential (Concrete Blonde album) =

Compilation album by Concrete Blonde
- Released: March 29, 2005
- Length: 54:11
- Label: Capitol, EMI

Concrete Blonde chronology
Mojave (2004)	The Essential (2005)

The Essential is a compilation album by American alternative rock band Concrete Blonde, released in 2005.

== Critical reception ==
Professional ratings
Review scores
Source	Rating
AllMusic	3/5 stars
PopMatters	8/10

Johnny Loftus, writing for AllMusic, noted the compilation's similarity to the band's 2002 compilation Classic Masters, but felt that like its 2002 predecessor, The Essential fails to "adequately replace" the 1996 compilation Recollection: The Best of Concrete Blonde. Loftus noted the omission of tracks from the band's 1993 album Mexican Moon and also the lack of any unreleased material. He concluded it was "a pretty satisfactory overview of Concrete Blonde's IRS output" and "probably OK for the casual fan". PopMatters described The Essential as "very good, if flawed overview of these cult darlings". They also noted the lack of any songs from Mexican Moon and also questioned whether the inclusion of "Little Wing" and "Roses Grow" can be considered essential.

== Track listing ==
All tracks are written by Johnette Napolitano except where noted.

No.	Title	Writer(s)	Length
1.	"Still in Hollywood"		3:43
2.	"True"	Napolitano, James Mankey	3:00
3.	"Dance Along the Edge"		5:30
4.	"God Is a Bullet"	Concrete Blonde	4:23
5.	"Happy Birthday"	Concrete Blonde	2:20
6.	"Sun"	Concrete Blonde	2:18
7.	"The Sky Is a Poisonous Garden"	Napolitano, Bruce Moreland	2:37
8.	"Caroline"		5:29
9.	"Joey"		4:06
10.	"Tomorrow, Wendy"	Andy Prieboy	5:06
11.	"Little Wing"	Jimi Hendrix	4:16
12.	"Walking in London"		4:49
13.	"Someday?"		3:29
14.	"Roses Grow" (Live)		3:05

== Personnel ==
- Frank Collura – compilation producer
- Evren Göknar – mastering
- Asterik Studio – design
- Diana Barnes – art direction
- Gerri Miller – liner notes
- Paul Natkin, Chansley Entertainment Archives – band photography
