= Someday? (Concrete Blonde song) =

1992 single by Concrete Blonde

Single by Concrete Blonde

from the album Walking in London
- B-side: "Why Don't You See Me"
- Released: 1992
- Genre: Alternative rock
- Length: 3:30
- Label: I.R.S.
- Songwriter: Johnette Napolitano
- Producers: Concrete Blonde; Chris Tsangarides

Concrete Blonde singles chronology
"Ghost of a Texas Ladies' Man" (1992)	"Someday?" (1992)	"Walking in London" (1992)

"Someday?" is a song from American rock band Concrete Blonde, released in 1992 as the second single from their fourth studio album, Walking in London (1992). The song was written by Johnette Napolitano, and produced by Concrete Blonde and Chris Tsangarides. "Someday?" reached number 8 on the US Billboard Modern Rock Tracks chart in May 1992.

== Background ==
Speaking to Billboard in 1992, Napolitano spoke about "Someday?" in relation to their 1990 hit "Joey". She stated, "Everybody wanted another mid-tempo pop gem – which we buried way on the second side [of Walking in London]. We consciously started the record with something harder-edged, to show our audience something different right away."

== Music video ==
The song's music video was directed by Jane Simpson and produced by Joan Weidman, Simpson and Tina Silvey for Silvey + Co. It achieved active rotation on MTV.

== Critical reception ==
In a review of Walking in London, Parry Gettelman of The Orlando Sentinel stated, "'Someday?' could be a lost number from the Pretenders' golden days with fascinating hints of the Rolling Stones' 'Beast of Burden' and Concrete Blonde's own 'Joey' in the melody." Scott Bacon of The Indianapolis Star described the song as "delightful" and "Pretenders-like", with Napolitano "pinpoint[ing] the frustration of love, hope and dreams". Dave Larsen of the Dayton Daily News felt the song was "poised to pounce on the mainstream". Steve Terrell of The Santa Fe New Mexican wrote, "At its worst, Concrete Blonde has a tendency to sound like Fleetwood Mac, with Napolitano as a surly Christine McVie. This is the case with 'Someday?' on this album."

In a retrospective on the music of 1992, Don Mayhew of The Fresno Bee selected "Someday?" as one of his favourites of the year. He wrote, "The irony is that while Concrete Blonde certainly has the expertise to rock, Napolitano's voice is better suited to sweet, simple lullabies like this." Chuck Campbell of the Scripps Howard News Service picked "Someday?" as number four of his top five 'best singles of 1992' and stated, "Napolitano is as beseeching here as she was on the group's breathtaking 1990 hit, 'Joey.'"

== Formats ==
Cassette single (US)
No.	Title	Length
1.	"Someday"	3:30
2.	"Why Don't You See Me"	4:31

Cassette and CD single (Australia)
No.	Title	Length
1.	"Someday"	3:30
2.	"Why Don't You See Me"	4:31

7-inch single (UK and Europe)
No.	Title	Length
1.	"Someday"	3:30
2.	"Probably Will"	2:50

7-inch and cassette single (France)
No.	Title	Length
1.	"Someday"	3:50
2.	"100 Games of Solitaire"	3:37

CD single (UK #1 and France maxi-single)
No.	Title	Length
1.	"Someday"	3:32
2.	"Probably Will"	2:52
3.	"100 Games of Solitaire"	3:37
4.	"Les Coeurs Jumeaux"	4:15

CD single (UK #2)
No.	Title	Length
1.	"Someday"	3:32
2.	"Joey"	4:09
3.	"Happy Birthday"	2:21
4.	"Still in Hollywood"	3:44

CD single (Netherlands)
No.	Title	Length
1.	"Someday"	3:32
2.	"Why Don't You See Me"	4:33
3.	"Probably Will"	2:52
4.	"100 Games of Solitaire"	3:37
5.	"Les Coeurs Jumeaux"	4:15

CD single (US promo)
No.	Title	Length
1.	"Someday?"	3:30

== Personnel ==
Credits are adapted from the UK CD #2 and Netherlands CD single liner notes and the Walking in London CD album booklet.

"Someday?"

- Johnette Napolitano – vocals, bass
- James Mankey – guitars
- Harry Rushakoff – drums, percussion

Production

- Concrete Blonde – producers (all tracks)
- Chris Tsangarides – producer ("Someday?", "Joey", "Why Don't You See Me", "Les Coeurs Jumeaux"), megamix ("Happy Birthday")
- Earle Mankey – producer ("Still in Hollywood"), additional recording and mixing ("Joey"), recording ("Happy Birthday")
- Sean Freehill – recording ("Probably Will" and "100 Games of Solitaire")
- James Mankey – additional recording and mixing ("Joey")

== Charts ==
Chart (1992)	Peak position
Australia (ARIA Charts)	72
Canada Top Singles (RPM)	13
Netherlands (Single Top 100)	62
Netherlands (Tipparade)	14
US Alternative Airplay (Billboard)	8
