= Live in Brazil 2002 =

Live In Brazil 2002

Live album by Concrete Blonde
- Released: March 18, 2003
- Genres: Alternative rock; post-punk
- Label: Ark 21

Concrete Blonde chronology
Group Therapy (2002)	Live In Brazil 2002 (2003)	Mojave (2004)

Professional ratings
Review scores
Source	Rating
AllMusic	3/5 stars

A double-disc recording of the alternative rock band Concrete Blonde performing live in Brazil in 2002.

== Track listing ==
Disc 1:

1. "God Is a Bullet"
2. "Valentine"
3. "Tonight"
4. "Everybody Knows"
5. "The Vampire Song"
6. "Take Me Home"
7. "Little Conversations"
8. "Caroline"
9. "Joey"

Disc 2:

1. "Days and Days"
2. "I Was a Fool"
3. "Violent"
4. "Someday"
5. "Scene of a Perfect Crime"
6. "Your Haunted Head"
7. "Roxy"
8. "Mexican Moon"
9. "Tomorrow, Wendy"
