= Still in Hollywood =

Compilation album by Concrete Blonde
- Released: November 1, 1994
- Genre: Alternative rock

Concrete Blonde chronology
Mexican Moon (1993)	Still in Hollywood (1994)	Recollection: The Best of Concrete Blonde (1996)

Professional ratings
Review scores
Source	Rating
Allmusic	2.5/5 stars

Still in Hollywood is an album by American rock band Concrete Blonde, including a selection of live recording, b-sides from singles, alternate versions of studio recordings, cover songs and other miscellanies.

== Track listing ==
1. "It'll Chew You Up and Spit You Out" (alternate version of "Still in Hollywood" from Concrete Blonde)
2. "Everybody Knows" (Leonard Cohen)
3. "Free"
4. "God Is a Bullet" (live)
5. "Probably Will"
6. "Mandocello" (Cheap Trick)
7. "The Ship Song" (Nick Cave)
8. "Joey" (live)
9. "Little Wing" (Jimi Hendrix)
10. "Roses Grow" (live)
11. "The Sky Is a Poisonous Garden" (live)
12. "Bloodletting (The Vampire Song)" (extended version)
13. "Simple Twist of Fate" (Bob Dylan)
14. "Side of the Road"
15. "100 Games of Solitaire"
16. "Tomorrow, Wendy" (live)
