= Dream 6 (EP) =

EP by Dream 6
- Released: 1983
- Genre: Post-punk
- Length: 22:53
- Label: Happy Hermit Co.
- Producer: Dream 6; Earle Mankey

Dream 6 chronology
Dream 6 (1983)	Concrete Blonde (1986)

Dream 6 is an extended play by American rock band Dream 6 (who later achieved fame as Concrete Blonde), released by Happy Hermit Co. in 1983.

== Background ==
Dream 6 was recorded at the independent recording studio Gold Star Studios in Los Angeles in 1983. Singer and bassist Johnette Napolitano and guitarist James Mankey first formed a band together named the Dreamers in 1982, who became known as the L.A. Dreamers shortly after. In 1983, Napolitano and Mankey booked themselves into Gold Star Studios and invited drummer Michael Murphy to record with them. The resulting EP and trio were named Dream 6 as there were six songs chosen for the EP. In 2003, Napolitano recalled of the sessions, "We slammed out the songs, but didn't have enough time to mix them all... but used the rough mixes anyway."

Dream 6 gained a positive critical response and brought the band to the attention of a number of major labels, including Elektra. Napolitano and Mankey, along with drummer Harry Rushakoff, would sign with I.R.S. in 1986 and rename themselves Concrete Blonde. The EP's opening track "Rain" was featured on the soundtrack of the film. 'The Party Animal' and re-recorded in 1993 for the band's fourth studio album Mexican Moon.

== Release ==
Dream 6 was independently released in the US by Happy Hermit Co. in 1983. Approximately 900 copies of the EP were pressed, of which only a few hundred included inserts due to printing costs. In 1985, the EP received a release in France on the Madrigal label.

In 1993, the EP received its first reissue on CD by Capitol when it was given away with promotional only copies of Concrete Blonde's fifth studio album Mexican Moon. In 2003, Happy Hermit Co. reissued the EP on CD with one bonus track, a cover of The Animals' "It's My Life" recorded during the same sessions, and new sleeve notes by Napolitano.

== Critical reception ==
Professional ratings
Review scores
Source	Rating
AllMusic	2/5 stars

Upon its release, Billboard described Dream 6 as "quite a pleasant surprise with this young three-person band coming up with bright and fresh pop songs, using only a guitar, bass and drum lineup". They added, "The songs are original, with substance, and Johnette, the lead singer, more than does them justice." Fred Goodman of Cash Box praised it as "no-frills power rock by a self-assured trio". He noted that Napolitano "packs a tough punch" and "sound[s] like a streetwise Carole Pope". He praised the closing track "Daddy Lied" as one which "will garner AOR play if anybody takes the time to listen to it".

Punk zine Flipside considered Dream 6 to be "more like the Wharf Rat stuff, 60's psychedelia, this with a female singer" and added, "If you like that style, mind you these are all a little different, pick this up." Robert Lloyd of L.A. Weekly described Dream 6 as a "post-post-punk-pop power trio", with Napolitano a "hipper Pat Benatar with a touch of Chrissie Hynde". He added that Napolitano "shares a keen sense of high drama" with Benatar and noted the EP's "fat sound courtesy of Earle Mankey".

In the 1991 book The Trouser Press Record Guide, Ira A. Robbins felt Dream 6 to be "an intriguing, unassuming item" and commented, "Using the same organizational chart as the Police, Dream 6 draws on various styles, offering little personality besides the vocals, which are plain but pleasant." Tom Demalon of AllMusic was retrospectively critical of the EP, feeling there was "nothing very remarkable about it" and adding that it was a "curiosity for the more fervent fans of Concrete Blonde". He stated, "The songs are straight-ahead, punk-tinged rock, although on songs like 'Daddy Lied' Napolitano displays the vocal power that would endear her to fans later."

== Track listing ==
All tracks are written by James Mankey and Johnette Napolitano, except "Tomorrow May Never Come" by Mankey, Michael Murphy and Napolitano.

No.	Title	Length
1.	"Rain"	3:19
2.	"Human Condition"	3:33
3.	"Tomorrow May Never Come"	5:48
4.	"Slowdown"	3:17
5.	"Secret Life"	2:37
6.	"Daddy Lied"	4:19

2003 CD reissue bonus track
No.	Title	Writer(s)	Length
7.	"It's My Life" (The Animals cover)	Roger Atkins, Carl D'Errico	3:06

== Personnel ==
Credits are adapted from the original 1983 vinyl EP sleeve notes.

Dream 6

- Johnette Napolitano – vocals, bass
- James Mankey – guitars
- Michael Murphy – drums, percussion

Production

- Dream 6, Earle Mankey – producers
