= Ghost of a Texas Ladies' Man =

1992 single by Concrete Blonde

Single by Concrete Blonde

from the album Walking in London
- B-side: "Everybody Knows"
- Released: February 1992
- Genre: Alternative rock
- Length: 3:50
- Label: I.R.S.
- Songwriter: Johnette Napolitano
- Producers: Concrete Blonde; Chris Tsangarides

Concrete Blonde singles chronology
"Tomorrow, Wendy" (1991)	"Ghost of a Texas Ladies' Man" (1992)	"Someday?" (1992)

"Ghost of a Texas Ladies' Man" is a song from American rock band Concrete Blonde, released in February 1992 as the lead single from their fourth studio album, Walking in London (1992). The song was written by Johnette Napolitano, and produced by Concrete Blonde and Chris Tsangarides. It reached number two on the US Billboard Modern Rock Tracks chart in March 1992.

== Background ==
Napolitano was inspired to write "Ghost of a Texas Ladies' Man" after a supernatural experience she had during an overnight stay at the Driskill Hotel in Austin, Texas, in March 1991, while the band were on tour as the opening act for Sting. Napolitano revealed to the Detroit Free Press in 1992, "There's this horny ghost there that goes for women. 'I wanna see you naked,' that was the vibe. The minute I took my clothes off, I felt like there was someone watching me." She added to the Austin American-Statesman,

"He kept turning the lights on and off in my room. I finally unplugged all the lamps. Then he turned on the light in the closet and really slowly opened the closet door, just like a hand was opening it. The light in the closet shined out into the room onto the bed. Then I knew for sure he was there. I just said, 'I know you're here, but I know that you're not going to hurt me, so I'm going to go to sleep now.' I just got this feeling of amusement, like he was playing. He was just like a rascal. It was like a game. I guess I'm lucky he was in a good mood."

After her experience, Napolitano felt "inspired to write something funny". Describing its creation as a "refreshing experience", she told the Austin American-Statesman, "I've never written a song like that before. I just really liked the ectoplasm and everything. I was cracking up the entire time I wrote it. It was really funny."

== Music video ==
The song's music video was directed by Jane Simpson and produced by Joan Weidman, Simpson and Tina Silvey for Silvey + Co. The video received its premiere on MTV on February 16, and would go on to achieve active rotation on the channel.

== Critical reception ==
On its release, The Hard Report described "Ghost of a Texas Ladies' Man" as "a rhythm driven 'lil devil", with "witty, intelligent lyrics" and a "semi-campy arrangement". They noted Mankey's "'Ghost Riders in the Sky' style guitar" as being "quite the attention getter" and added that Napolitano has "never been in better voice". Dave Sholin of The Gavin Report wrote, "A far cry from their biggest hit, 'Joey,' but then again, of the many things one might say to describe Concrete Blonde, 'predictable' is not one of them."

Jordan Zivitz of the Montreal Gazette commented, "The song is far better than most of the rubbish on radio nowadays, but Concrete Blonde has set such high expectations for themselves that this new track is disappointing. Although tinges of black humor have laced many of their past songs, Concrete Blonde laced it on a bit thick this time." In his top ten list of single releases for the first half of 1992, Robert Hilburn of the Los Angeles Times picked the song as number seven and commented, "Combines the authority and gallop of the Pretenders with the mysterious but arty currents of film director Wim Wenders."

In a review of Walking in London, Parry Gettelman of The Orlando Sentinel described the song as "a cowboy-ghost-story-romance set to cattle-drive rhythms". He added, "Mankey turns into the Ennio Morricone of the guitar [and] Napolitano's delivery is full-throttle, but she strikes a note of wry detachment, half-speaking humorous lines. The production is widescreen, with a swelling chorus of 'oh-oh-ohs' worthy of a spaghetti western soundtrack." Barbara Jaeger of The Record commented, "The jaunty tune, with its spaghetti western feel fueled by Napolitano's dusky vocals [is] unlike anything the trio has done before."

== Formats ==
Cassette and CD single (US and Australasia)
No.	Title	Length
1.	"Ghost of a Texas Ladies' Man"	3:50
2.	"Everybody Knows"	4:42

7-inch single (Europe)
No.	Title	Length
1.	"Ghost of a Texas Ladies' Man"	3:50
2.	"Everybody Knows"	4:42

CD single (US and Netherlands)
No.	Title	Notes	Length
1.	"Ghost of a Texas Ladies' Man"		3:50
2.	"Bloodletting (The Vampire Song)"	Extended Version	7:06
3.	"Everybody Knows"		4:42
4.	"The Ship Song"	with Steve Wynn	4:18

== Personnel ==
Credits are adapted from the US CD single liner notes and the Walking in London CD album booklet.

"Ghost of a Texas Ladies' Man"

- Johnette Napolitano – vocals, bass
- James Mankey – guitars
- Harry Rushakoff – drums, percussion

Production

- Concrete Blonde, Chris Tsangarides – producers on "Ghost of a Texas Ladies' Man" and "Bloodletting (The Vampire Song)"
- Chris Marshall – recording assistant on "Ghost of a Texas Ladies' Man"
- Earle Mankey – mixing on "Ghost of a Texas Ladies' Man"
- John Jackson – assistant mixer on "Ghost of a Texas Ladies' Man"
- John Golden – mastering on "Ghost of a Texas Ladies' Man"
- Concrete Blonde, Earle Mankey – remixers on extended version of "Bloodletting (The Vampire Song)"
- Dennis Herring – producer on "Everybody Knows"
- Concrete Blonde – producers on "The Ship Song"
- Sean Freehill – recording on "The Ship Song"

Other

- Ann E. Sperling – photography

== Charts ==
Chart (1992)	Peak position
Australia (ARIA)	31
Canada Top Singles (RPM)	28
US Modern Rock Tracks (Billboard)	2
