= Concrete Blonde (album) =

Studio album by Concrete Blonde
- Released: 1986
- Genres: Alternative rock; hard rock; post-punk
- Length: 42:49
- Label: I.R.S.
- Producer: Earle Mankey

Concrete Blonde chronology
Dream 6 (1983)	Concrete Blonde (1986)	Free (1989)

Singles from Concrete Blonde
- 1. "Still in Hollywood" Released: 1986; 2. "True" Released: 1987; 3. "Dance Along the Edge" Released: 1987

Concrete Blonde is the debut studio album by American rock band Concrete Blonde, released in 1986, by I.R.S. Records. The band released an EP three years prior, under the name Dream 6, but rebranded to Concrete Blonde in 1986, chosen by labelmate Michael Stipe as a contrast between their hard rock music and introspective lyrics. Concrete Blonde is the band's first release with the name, and compared to their later work, has a more post-punk sound.

Three singles were released from the album, "Still in Hollywood", "Dance Along the Edge" and "True", each with a music video, but only the latter charted, reaching No. 42 on the US Mainstream Rock chart and No. 91 on the Australian ARIA charts. The album was not the commercial breakthrough the band was looking for, leading them to declare bankruptcy and take a hiatus. Superfecta Recordings remastered and re-released the album on May 11, 2004.

Critical reception was relatively kind on release, and the album garnered the band a cult following, but nowadays, the self-titled debut album is seen as one of the weaker albums in Concrete Blonde's discography. Criticism has been drawn towards the raw production, overambition as the band still figured out their sound, and Johnette Napolitano's untrained vocals.

== Background ==
Singer-songwriter and bassist Johnette Napolitano and guitarist James Mankey were active on the fringes of the Los Angeles punk and new wave scenes. They formed a duo, under the name Dreamers, and released their first song, "Heart Attack", on the compilation album The D.I.Y. Album (1982). The track was co-produced by James and his brother Earle Mankey, who also programmed the drums.

Joined by drummer Michael Murphy, they became Dream 6 and released an eponymous extended play on the independent label Happy Hermit in 1983 (released in France in 1985 by Madrigal). This caught the attention of I.R.S. Records, who signed the band in 1986. The band renamed to Concrete Blonde the same year, at the request of labelmate Michael Stipe, and were joined by drummer Harry Rushakoff on their eponymous debut album.

== Composition and lyrics ==
Concrete Blonde, while showcasing an early version of the alternative rock and hard rock sound that brought the band to popularity four years later with Bloodletting (1990), is more rooted in the Los Angeles post-punk club circuit that spawned bands like X, Wall of Voodoo, and the Go-Go's, and even borders on punk rock, particularly on "Still in Hollywood". James Mankey has stated the band never associated with the punk scene, and they "just wanted to make cool pop songs, songs that would send shivers down your spine". His brother, Earle Mankey, produced the album with a similarly raw mix to the band's debut EP, which they released as Dream 6 three years prior.

Napolitano's lyrics are dark, but like the music, is more punk than gothic, criticizing, Hollywood, Los Angeles, her city of residence. The album opens with the lines, "Well, when I've had enough, I'll get a pick-up truck, and I'll drive away, I'll take my last 10 bucks, just as far as it will go." Napolitano's cynical view of life in California is continued in "Still in Hollywood", with the chorus "Oh, wow, thought I'd be outta here by now," and in the cover of George Harrison's "Beware of Darkness".

== Release ==
Concrete Blonde was released as the band's debut studio album in 1986, and distributed by I.R.S. Only charting in the US, the album reached No. 96 on the Billboard 200, and No. 100 on Cash Box Top 100 albums. Three singles and music videos followed the album: "Still in Hollywood", "Dance Along the Edge" and "True", but only the latter charted, reaching No. 42 on the US Mainstream Rock chart and No. 91 on the Australian ARIA charts.

While earning the band a strong cult following, this was not reflected in the album's sales figures. The band tried to tour for Concrete Blonde, but were forced to declare bankruptcy, and for almost three years, went on hiatus. PopMatters suggested that "Over Your Shoulder" should have been a single, but regardless, the band returned in April 1989 with their second studio album, Free. While not a smash hit, the album's lead single, "God Is a Bullet", saw success on college radio that helped the band see mainstream success on Bloodletting (1990) a year later.

== Critical reception ==
Professional ratings
Review scores
Source	Rating
AllMusic	2/5 stars
Sounds	4/5 stars

On AllMusic, the album is the band's lowest rated, with two out of five stars. William Ruhlmann wrote "the multiplicity of musical styles [that] demonstrated that Concrete Blonde's main characteristic was ambition, not talent," and the addition of drummer Jim Mankey "did nothing to bring musical focus to the partnership".

Ira Robbins and Jack Partain of Trouser Press called the album "terrible", and added it "sounds like half-finished demos no one with ears would give a second listen", and "Napolitano's untrained voice is remarkably unattractive (especially when she tries too hard to ape Chrissie Hynde)." They compare the guitar work to Mark Knopfler and Andy Summers, but conclude it is "duff".

Chris Caroll, in a July 1987 issue of SPIN, wrote that Concrete Blonde is a "little, well, flaky" and sounds like what you expect from a "nouveau thrash power trio that plays the occasional acoustic love song and comes from L.A" to. When opening for Eddie Money on tour for the album, the band was booed by the audience, with Napolitano saying:

"These people are so rude, I mean didn't their mothers teach them anything? So I turned around and mooned em' and they booed more. Maybe if I was Heather Locklear...."

== Legacy ==
Superfecta Recordings remastered and re-released the album on May 11, 2004, adding the bonus track "It'll Chew You Up and Spit You Out", written by Napolitano and Mankey.

"Still in Hollywood", "Your Haunted Head" and "Over Your Shoulder" were featured on The Hidden soundtrack. "Your Haunted Head" and "Over Your Shoulder" appeared also on The Texas Chainsaw Massacre 2 soundtrack. In 1997, Canadian punk band Propagandhi covered "True" for the Fat Wreck Chords compilation album Physical Fatness, as well Propagandhi's rarities compilation Where Quantity Is Job #1.

== Track listing ==
All songs written by Johnette Napolitano, except where noted.

No.	Title	Writer(s)	Length
1.	"True"	James Mankey, Napolitano	2:59
2.	"Your Haunted Head"		2:47
3.	"Dance Along the Edge"		5:27
4.	"Still in Hollywood"		3:40
5.	"Song for Kim (She Said)"		4:08
6.	"Beware of Darkness"	George Harrison	3:44
7.	"Over Your Shoulder"	Mankey, Napolitano	3:22
8.	"Little Sister"		3:52
9.	"(You're the Only One) Can Make Me Cry"		2:17
10.	"Cold Part of Town"		3:10
11.	"True" (Instrumental)	Mankey	2:24
Total length:			37:50

Remaster bonus track
No.	Title	Writer(s)	Length
1.	"It'll Chew You Up and Spit You Out"	Mankey, Napolitano	4:34
Total length:			42:52

== Charts ==
Chart (1987)	Peak position
US Billboard 200	96
US Cash Box Top 100 Albums	100
