= Walking in London (album) =

Studio album by Concrete Blonde
- Released: March 10, 1992
- Genres: Alternative rock; gothic rock
- Length: 43:51
- Label: I.R.S.
- Producers: Concrete Blonde; Chris Tsangarides

Concrete Blonde chronology
Bloodletting (1990)	Walking in London (1992)	Mexican Moon (1993)

Singles from Walking in London
- 1. "Ghost of a Texas Ladies' Man" Released: February 1992; 2. "Walking in London" Released: 1992; 3. "Someday?" Released: 1992; 4. "I Just Wanna Be Your Friend Again" Released: 1992

Professional ratings
Review scores
Source	Rating
AllMusic	3/5 stars
Rolling Stone	4/5 stars

Walking in London is the fourth studio album from rock band Concrete Blonde. It features the song "...Long Time Ago" which played over the ending credits of The Shield's series finale.

Walking in London peaked at number 18 on the Australian ARIA Charts.

== Music ==
Critic Tom Demalon of AllMusic described the album as "a good record but not nearly as pleasing as its breakthrough predecessor" (1990's Bloodletting), but notes certain exceptional tracks: "Ghost of a Texas Ladies' Man", "Someday?", "Long Time Ago", and "the gorgeous ballad 'Les Cœurs Jumeaux'". In The New Yorker, Elizabeth Wurtzel offered particular praise for the cover of James Brown's "It's a Man's Man's Man's World" and its "ironic interpretation that emphasizes the second half of the chorus – the part that says 'But it wouldn't mean nothing without a woman or a girl' – and turns Brown's misogyny into a feminist anthem."

"Ghost of a Texas Ladies' Man" was released as a single.

== Track listing ==
All songs written by Johnette Napolitano, except where noted.

No.	Title	Writer(s)	Length
1.	"Ghost of a Texas Ladies' Man"		3:51
2.	"Walking in London"		6:43
3.	"Les Cœurs Jumeaux" ("Twin Hearts")		4:15
4.	"Woman to Woman"		4:30
5.	"Why Don't You See Me"		4:31
6.	"City Screaming"		4:01
7.	"Someday?"		3:30
8.	"I Wanna Be Your Friend Again"		5:18
9.	"...Long Time Ago"		2:16
10.	"It's a Man's World"	James Brown, Betty Jean Newsome	4:56

== Personnel ==
Musicians:

- Bernadette Colomine – vocals, voices
- James Mankey – guitar
- Johnette Napolitano – bass, vocals
- Tom Petersson – bass
- Andy Prieboy – vocals
- Harry Rushakoff – percussion, drums

Production:

- Erich Baron – assistant engineer
- Sean Freehill – assistant engineer
- John Golden – mastering
- John Jackson – mixing assistant
- Earle Mankey – engineer, mixing
- Chris Marshall – engineer, assistant engineer
- Annie Sperling – art direction, photography
- Chris Tsangarides – producer

== Charts ==
Chart (1992)	Peak position
Australian Albums (ARIA)	18
Canada Top Albums/CDs (RPM)	13
New Zealand Albums (RMNZ)	32
US Billboard 200	73
