= True (Concrete Blonde song) =

Single by Concrete Blonde

from the album Concrete Blonde
- Released: 1987
- Genre: Alternative rock
- Length: 2:59
- Label: I.R.S.
- Songwriters: Johnette Napolitano; James Mankey
- Producers: Earle Mankey; Concrete Blonde

Concrete Blonde singles chronology
"Still in Hollywood" (1986)	"True" (1987)	"Dance Along the Edge" (1987)

"True" is a song from American rock band Concrete Blonde, released in 1987 as the second single from their debut studio album, Concrete Blonde (1986). The song was written by Johnette Napolitano and James Mankey, and produced by Earle Mankey and Concrete Blonde. The song reached number 42 on the US Billboard Album Rock Tracks chart.

== Music video ==
The song's music video was directed by Jane Simpson and produced by Tina Silvey for Silvey-Lee Productions. It achieved medium rotation on MTV.

== Critical reception ==
On its release, Cash Box wrote, "Somewhere between Suzanne Vega and Chrissie Hynde, Concrete Blonde's Napolitano has delivered one of the most compelling, searing performances of 1987 here. Like the name suggests, there is something tender, something tough to this group." Billboard described "True" as a "tasty neo-Velvets tidbit, with Napolitano landing somewhere between Nico and Chrissie Hynde."

In the UK, Len Brown of New Musical Express described "True" as being "as vulnerable as Velvet" and noted the contrast to its "as tough as a Tonka truck" B-side "Still in Hollywood". Brown added that the band were "blessed with the low (Mc)Kee vocals" of Napolitano. Paul Massey of the Aberdeen Evening Express described Concrete Blonde as a "promising Los Angeles trio" with "True" being a "cool, mid-tempo rock ballad distinctive for Napolitano's fragile, edgy vocals".

== Formats ==
7-inch single (US and UK)
No.	Title	Notes	Length
1.	"True"		2:59
2.	"True II"	Instrumental	2:22

7-inch single (Europe)
No.	Title	Length
1.	"True"	2:59
2.	"Still in Hollywood"	3:40

7-inch single (Australia)
No.	Title	Length
1.	"True"	2:59
2.	"Cold Part of Town"	3:10

7-inch promotional single (US)
No.	Title	Length
1.	"True"	2:59
2.	"True"	2:59

12-inch single (UK)
No.	Title	Notes	Length
1.	"True"		2:59
2.	"It'll Chew You Up, and Spit You Out"		4:32
3.	"True II"	Instrumental	2:22

12-inch promotional single (US)
No.	Title	Length
1.	"True"	2:59
2.	"Still in Hollywood"	3:40

== Personnel ==
Credits are adapted from the Australian and European 7-inch and UK 12-inch sleeve notes.

Concrete Blonde

- Johnette Napolitano – vocals, bass
- James Mankey – guitars
- Harry Rushakoff – drums

Production

- Earle Mankey, Concrete Blonde – producers

== Charts ==
Chart (1987)	Peak position
Australia (Kent Music Report)	91
US Mainstream Rock (Billboard)	42
