= Dance Along the Edge =

Single by Concrete Blonde

from the album Concrete Blonde
- B-side: "(You're the Only One) Can Make Me Cry"
- Released: 1987
- Length: 5:27 (album version); 3:55 (single version)
- Label: I.R.S.
- Songwriter: Johnette Napolitano
- Producers: Earle Mankey; Concrete Blonde

Concrete Blonde singles chronology
| "True" (1987) | "Dance Along the Edge" (1987) | "God Is a Bullet" (1989) |

"Dance Along the Edge" is a song from American rock band Concrete Blonde, released in 1987 as the third and final single from their debut studio album, Concrete Blonde (1986). The song was written by Johnette Napolitano and was produced by Earle Mankey and Concrete Blonde.

== Background ==
In a 1987 interview with the Palm Beach Post, vocalist and bassist Johnette Napolitano described the message behind "Dance Along the Edge": "[It's about] the edge between people and their fear of stepping over it. The fear of surrender and of being hurt. We suffer from the fear of opening up."

== Release ==
Although it failed to reach any major music charts, "Dance Along the Edge" received airplay on US radio and reached its peak of No. 67 on radio trade magazine FMQB's Hot Trax 100 chart on 22 May 1987. It was also listed in Radio & Records magazine's "new and active" listings for national AOR Tracks airplay during April and May 1987.

For its release as a single, the full five-and-a-half minute LP version of the song was edited down to just under four minutes. The edit for the Australian release cut it down further to just under three-and-a-half minutes.

== Music video ==
The song's accompanying music video was directed by Jane Simpson and was produced by Tina Silvey for Silvey-Lee Productions. It achieved breakout rotation on MTV.

== Critical reception ==
Upon its release, Billboard wrote that Concrete Blonde "delivers a melancholic rock track highlighting the presence of vocalist/bassist Johnette Napolitano". Cash Box noted that the "deft production gives this eerie tune a varied, engaging texture". In a review of the music video, Chris Willman, writing for the Los Angeles Times, commented on how the "grainy" black and white footage makes Napolitano "look like an edgy silent film star" and added that she has "the most dangerous eyes in rock since Martha Davis at her emotional peak". He stated that the song's message about "modern lovers and friends who skirt along the boundaries of commitment without ever making real bonds" is "wholly immediate" and noted the irony of Napolitano "adorn[ing] the ultimate symbol of commitment – a wedding dress".

In a review of Concrete Blonde, Michelle Gaffigan of the Daily Illini considered the song to show Napolitano's "ability to write compassionate, hard-hitting lyrics". She continued, "The song describes a 'love under glass' relationship in which both people are comfortable but searching for something more fulfilling, and are afraid to make the first move."

== Formats ==
7-inch single (US)
| No. | Title | Length |
|---|---|---|
| 1. | "Dance Along the Edge" | 3:55 |
| 2. | "(You're the Only One) Can Make Me Cry" | 2:16 |

7-inch single (Australia)
| No. | Title | Notes | Length |
|---|---|---|---|
| 1. | "Dance Along the Edge" | Edit | 3:25 |
| 2. | "Can Make Me Cry" | | 2:16 |

12-inch promotional single (US)
| No. | Title | Notes | Length |
|---|---|---|---|
| 1. | "Dance Along the Edge" | Edited Version | 3:57 |
| 2. | "Dance Along the Edge" | LP Version | 5:29 |

== Personnel ==
Concrete Blonde

- Johnette Napolitano – vocals, bass
- James Mankey – guitars
- Harry Rushakoff – drums

Production

- Earle Mankey – production
- Concrete Blonde – production
