= Jonestown (Concrete Blonde song) =

Single by Concrete Blonde

from the album Mexican Moon
- Released: 1993
- Length: 6:03 (album version); 5:02 (edit)
- Label: Capitol
- Songwriter: Johnette Napolitano
- Producers: Concrete Blonde; Sean Freehill

Concrete Blonde singles chronology
"I Wanna Be Your Friend Again" (1992)	"Jonestown" (1993)	"Heal It Up" (1993)

"Jonestown" is a song by American rock band Concrete Blonde, released in 1993 as the lead single from their fifth studio album, Mexican Moon. The song was written by Johnette Napolitano, and was produced by Concrete Blonde and Sean Freehill.

== Background ==
"Jonestown" was inspired by the American cult Peoples Temple who, under the leadership of Jim Jones, are known for the Jonestown mass murder-suicide of 1978, although lead vocalist and writer Johnette Napolitano has also said you could "substitute any figure that somebody decides is God one minute and then turns around and serves poison the next minute". The full version of the song opens with a minute-long extract from one of Jones's speeches to his followers, recorded at the mass suicide on November 17 and 18, 1978, which the band added to their recording after Napolitano discovered the full recordings via the released The Last Supper LP. She told The Miami Herald in 1994,

"We had recorded the song and then I found a record in my local shop. It was called The Last Supper and it was about Jim Jones passing out the Kool-Aid. It cost $25 – it was a rare record. And of course I had to buy it. [In the end], I sent it to a record collector friend of mine in Paris because I did not want it in my house."

== Release ==
"Jonestown" was released as the first single from Mexican Moon and was released to target college and alternative radio stations, plus MTV's 120 Minutes, whereas the following single, "Heal It Up", was then released to album rock stations. Music videos for both songs were shot during the same period. Concrete Blonde insisted to their label that "Jonestown" would be released as the first single. Mankey told The Charlotte Observer in 1993, "We were pretty firm about wanting that to be the first single. We didn't want to come out with something kind of gentle, where everyone would say now we're a lame-ass band. I thought 'Jonestown' epitomized the hard side of the band, which is always my favorite thing."

== Music video ==
The music video was paid for out of the band's own money.

== Critical reception ==
Steve Appleford of Billboard called "Jonestown" a "grim examination of religious cults". Gerry Krochak of The Leader-Post described it as "electric goth" on which Napolitano's "thrilling vocals dominate". Andy Seiler of The Courier-News commented, "The band specializes in moody melodies and tough messages, as on its new single, 'Jonestown', a horrifyingly harsh harrange that opens with a recording of the Rev. Jim Jones' most scarifying sermons and reminds the listener of the New Testament's warnings about false prophets." John Everson of the SouthtownStar noted the song's "scintillating crunch" on which Napolitano "takes an angry look at the cult phenonema". Jim Farber of the New York Daily News felt that it "shows a deep understanding of the human will to believe, just as Napolitano displays fear for faith taken to murderous extremes". Doug Pullen of the Ann Arbor News considered it to be a "dark fantasy and an ominous reminder of what people like Jim Jones and Branch Davidians leader David Koresh can do to others".

Jef Rouner, writing for the Houston Press, included the song in a 2011 feature on five songs inspired by the Jonestown mass murder-suicide. He noted, "Concrete Blonde has always had a penchant for good death tunes, and 'Jonestown' is one of those songs we're always surprised didn't end up as a major goth anthem."

== Formats ==
US 10-inch promotional single
No.	Title	Notes	Length
1.	"Jonestown"	LP Version	6:03
2.	"Jonestown"	Jim Jones Edit	5:02
3.	"Simple Twist of Fate"		5:40

== Personnel ==
Jonestown

- Johnette Napolitano – vocals, bass
- James Mankey – guitars, additional voices
- Paul Thompson – drums

Additional musicians

- Jeff Trott – additional voices
- Andy Prieboy – additional voices

Production

- Concrete Blonde – production ("Jonestown")
- Sean Freehill – production ("Jonestown"), engineering ("Simple Twist of Fate"), mixing ("Simple Twist of Fate")
- Johnette Napolitano – production ("Simple Twist of Fate")
- James Mankey – production ("Simple Twist of Fate")
- Tim Palmer – mixing ("Jonestown")
- Ted Jensen – mastering ("Jonestown")
