= Marc Moreland =

American rock musician (1958–2002)

Marc Moreland (January 8, 1958 – March 14, 2002) was an American rock musician. He was the former guitarist for rock band Wall of Voodoo, punk band the Skulls, and rock bands Pretty and Twisted and Department of Crooks. He also released a solo album under the name Marc Moreland Mess.

== Early life ==
Moreland grew up in West Covina, California, and was a student at Raymond Pre-School, Vine Elementary School, Hollencrest Intermediate School, West Covina High School and Coronado High School.

In the mid-1970s, Moreland was in Cpt. Cosmos de Venus and the Sky People—a metal/glam hybrid. From 1977 to the early '80s, Moreland played guitar in one of the earliest American punk bands, the Skulls. He wrote some of the band's earliest songs, including "Victims" and "Babies".

== Wall of Voodoo ==
Moreland was a founding member of Wall of Voodoo, which had its roots in Acme Soundtracks, an unsuccessful film score business started by vocalist-keyboardist-harmonica player Stan Ridgway. Acme Soundtracks' office was across the street from the Hollywood punk club the Masque, and Ridgway was soon drawn into the emerging punk-new wave scene.

Moreland began jamming with Ridgway at the Acme Soundtracks office and the soundtrack company morphed into a New Wave band. In 1977, with the addition of Skulls members Bruce Moreland (Marc Moreland's brother) as bassist-keyboardist and Chas T. Gray as keyboardist, along with Joe Nanini, who had been the drummer for Black Randy and the Metrosquad, the first lineup of Wall of Voodoo was born.

The band had a Billboard Hot 100 single in 1983 with the song "Mexican Radio", which received considerable play on the newly aired MTV. Ridgway recalled, "Marc and I used to go to rehearsal in my '67 Mustang and we were really fed up with Los Angeles radio. We were very cynical and we thought it was much better to tune into these Mexican radio stations that would waft in across the border — of course, now the stations are all over Los Angeles. Anyway, when we'd come across one of these stations playing mariachi music, we'd get all excited — 'Great, man, I'm on a Mexican radio!' I didn't think a thing about it until one day, Marc came in with this little one-minute (demo tape) sketch of that great guitar lick and him singing, 'I'm on a Mexican radio,' kind of mumbling it. I thought, 'Wow, that is just inspired and twisted,' and immediately some of the other lyrics came to mind and where to take it, although it was still a puzzle."

By 1983 Nanini and Ridgway had left the band, while Bruce Moreland was in and out of the band throughout their history. Moreland and Gray thus remained the only two constant members of the band until their split in 1988. After this, Moreland went on to work in various other projects.

== Pretty and Twisted ==
Moreland played guitar in the band Pretty and Twisted with Johnette Napolitano. Moreland and Napolitano had previously worked together on a Carpenters cover, "Hurting Each Other", for the album If I Were a Carpenter in 1994. Pretty and Twisted released a self-titled album in 1995.

Of working with Moreland, Napolitano said:

"I co-wrote more with Marc on this record than with Jim in the last five years. I think we are more like-minded. I think that we both have been closer to the same ideal, and a great group is always the sum total of the individuals that comprise the group. This band is the sum total of the individuals that are in it — we're different than Concrete Blonde. I just feel like we are at the same place at the same time."

== Department of Crooks ==
In 1995 Moreland met vocalist-guitarist Sheldon Ferguson and keyboardist Frederika in Las Vegas. After the demise of Pretty and Twisted, Moreland said he had given up music. However, the three musicians clicked and formed the band Department of Crooks. They released an album titled Plan 9 From Las Vegas and had moderate success both in the US and in Europe.

== Marc Moreland Mess ==
In 2002, Moreland released his lone solo album, titled Take it to the Spotlight, which is the only album which features Moreland on lead vocals. The album was released on California-based Kitchen Whore Records, and featured contributions from PJ Harvey's John Parish and Jean-Marc Butty.

== Death ==
Marc Moreland died of renal failure following a liver transplant on March 14, 2002, in Paris, France, at the age of 44.

== Mentions ==
Moreland is the subject of the song "Joey" by Concrete Blonde. Lead singer Johnette Napolitano wrote the song about being in love with an alcoholic, and confirmed the song was about Moreland in the Concrete Blonde D.C. Sessions concert in 2002. About Moreland, Napolitano said:

"I had met Marc Moreland in Australia the first time (Concrete Blonde) toured. That was the first country we toured outside of America. We were opening for Wall of Voodoo in Australia and we just became tighter than anything in a very short time. There was a lot of mutual worship there."

After his death, Moreland was the subject of the song "Jerry #5" by his former band the Skulls. The song appeared on their album The Golden Age of Piracy.

The documentary film Who Is Billy Bones? discusses Moreland's role in both the formation of the Skulls and Wall of Voodoo, and features archival photos of him performing in 1977 at the Los Angeles punk club The Masque.

In 2015, Andy Prieboy stated: "We won't do a Voodoo reunion without Marc. So until he shows up, sorry, no reunion."
