= Carry Me Away =

Carry Me Away may refer to:

- "Carry Me Away", a 1981 song by Rick Springfield from Working Class Dog
- "Carry Me Away", a 1989 song by Concrete Blonde from Free
- "Carry Me Away", a 2019 song by John Mayer from Sob Rock
