= Damage I've Done =

Single by The Heads

from the album No Talking, Just Head
- Released: 1996
- Length: 6:19 (album version); 4:44 (edit)
- Label: MCA, Radioactive
- Songwriters: Johnette Napolitano; Chris Frantz; Jerry Harrison; T. "Blast" Murray; Tina Weymouth
- Producers: Chris Frantz; Jerry Harrison; Tina Weymouth

The Heads singles chronology
"Damage I've Done" (1996)	"Don't Take My Kindness for Weakness" (1996)

"Damage I've Done" is a song from American band The Heads, released in 1996 as the lead single from their only studio album, No Talking, Just Head (1996). A collaboration between the Heads and former Concrete Blonde frontwoman Johnette Napolitano, "Damage I've Done" was written by Napolitano (lyrics), and Chris Frantz, Jerry Harrison, T. "Blast" Murray and Tina Weymouth (music). It was produced by the Heads.

== Background ==
The Heads were formed by the members of Talking Heads after their unsuccessful attempts to convince lead singer and lyricist David Byrne to return to work with the band. The three remaining members decided to record new material as the Heads and collaborate with various artists who would primarily provide the lyrics and vocals. The backing tracks for No Talking, Just Head, including that which became "Damage I've Done", were recorded in November 1994. Once completed, the band began contacting other artists they wanted to collaborate with, including Johnette Napolitano of Concrete Blonde fame. Speaking to Billboard in 1996, drummer Chris Frantz said, "We had never met her before. We just admired her work. I went to see her show in a club, and I was just amazed at the power she has."

Napolitano returned a few months later with a set of lyrics to form "Damage I've Done", and she then recorded her vocals and provided 'buzz guitar' on the track. Napolitano also contributed vocals on another album track, "Punk Lolita", alongside Debbie Harry and the Heads' bassist Tina Weymouth, as well as backing vocals on "Blue Blue Moon". The subsequent tour to promote the album featured Napolitano as the band's lead vocalist.

== Release ==
"Damage I've Done" was released as the album's first single, with promotional copies being sent out to US modern and mainstream rock stations in late August 1996. The song generated airplay in the United States and peaked at number 32 on the R&R Alternative Top 50 chart in November 1996. A number of remixes were created for the single's September release, including by Moby. The single reached number five on the Billboard Hot Dance Breakouts Club Play chart in January 1997.

== Music video ==
The song's music video was directed by Kevin Donovan. It reached number 33 on the Billboard Video Monitor list for MTV in November 1996, which recorded the top 50 most played clips on the channel.

== Critical reception ==
On its release, Larry Flick of Billboard described "Damage I've Done" as a "murky, oddly appealing rocker" and "derivative but undoubtedly hit-bound". He commented, "The band has clearly been listening to alterna-rock radio, given the way the track flows from sullen verses into screaming, distorted choruses." He noted the song's similarity to recent hits from artists such as Tracy Bonham, Alanis Morissette and Hole. In a review of No Talking, Just Head, David John Farinella of the San Francisco Examiner considered the song to sound "more like an old Concrete Blonde song than a tune this band would have penned".

Dirk Lammers of The Tampa Tribune wrote, "Napolitano eases into 'Damage I've Done', then her grating voice slams into high gear on the chorus." Tom Long of the Gannett News Service considered "Damage I've Done" to be the album's best track. He wrote, "Accompanied by fuzz guitar drones and a nice slinky bass riff, Napolitano moves between fear in the verse and hysteria in the treated chorus, trapped by her own life's indiscretions."

== Formats ==
CD single (US promo)
No.	Title	Notes	Length
1.	"Damage I've Done"	Edit	4:45
2.	"Damage I've Done"	Album Version	6:19

CD single (US and Europe)
No.	Title	Notes	Length
1.	"Damage I've Done"	Original Version Edit	4:44
2.	"Damage I've Done"	Moby Sad Gospel Mix	6:16
3.	"Damage I've Done"	Sound/Bisquit Vocal Mix	8:28
4.	"Damage I've Done"	Moby Melodic Deep Mix	5:34

12-inch single (US)
No.	Title	Notes	Length
1.	"Damage I've Done"	Sound/Bisquit Vocal Mix	8:27
2.	"Damage I've Done"	Moby Sad Gospel Mix	6:14
3.	"Damage I've Done"	Moby Melodic Deep Mix	5:33
4.	"Damage I've Done"	Original Version Edit	4:42

== Personnel ==
Credits are adapted from the US CD single liner notes and the No Talking, Just Head CD booklet.

Damage I've Done

- Johnette Napolitano – vocals, buzz guitar
- T. "Blast" Murray – guitar
- Tina Weymouth – bass guitar
- Jerry Harrison – keyboard
- Chris Frantz – drums

Production

- Chris Frantz, Jerry Harrison, Tina Weymouth – producers
- Moby – additional production and remix on "Moby Sad Gospel Mix" and "Moby Melodic Deep Mix"
- Bill Coleman, Ted Ottaviano – post production and remix on "Sound/Bisquit Vocal Mix"
- Doug McKean – recording
- Alex Gordon – additional recording
- Geoff Gibbs – additional recording assistant
- Tom Lord-Alge – engineer
- Fernio Hernandez – assistant engineer
- Ted Jensen – mastering

== Charts ==
Chart (1996–97)	Peak position
Canada Alternative 30 (RPM)	11
US Hot Dance Breakouts Club Play (Billboard)	5
