= Happy Birthday (Concrete Blonde song) =

Single by Concrete Blonde

from the album Free
- Released: 1989
- Genre: Jangle pop
- Length: 2:18
- Label: I.R.S.
- Songwriter: Concrete Blonde
- Producer: Concrete Blonde

Concrete Blonde singles chronology
"God Is a Bullet" (1989)	"Happy Birthday" (1989)	"Scene of a Perfect Crime" (1989)

"Happy Birthday" is a song from American rock band Concrete Blonde, released in 1989 as the second single from their second studio album, Free (1989). The song was written and produced by the band.

== Music video ==
The song's music video was directed by Jane Simpson. It was shot in an apartment in Silver Lake, Los Angeles. The footage is interspersed with animated drawings.

== Critical reception ==
On its release in the UK, Geoff Zeppelin of Record Mirror called "Happy Birthday" a "glorious, simple and downright hummable number" and continued, "Neat, jaunty and a snip over two minutes. What more could you ask for, except a chance to hear it on the radio?" Robert Sloman of the Staines & Ashford News described it as "original and hummable" and praised Concrete Blonde as "one of Los Angeles' finest rock bands". Chris Willman of the Los Angeles Times wrote, "This cheerful-sounding song, one of the year's catchiest, is really about an unhappy birthday, but Napolitano – writing about spending the night of her own 30th at home alone – is following in the great rock 'n' roll tradition of making feeling bad sound good. It's the best pop birthday song since the Beatles took a crack at it, and a little more substantive, too."

In a review of Free, Steve Hochman of the Los Angeles Times described the song as "guilelessly Beatlesque" and a song about "remembering and/or looking forward to better times". David Okamoto of the St. Petersburg Times commented, "Napolitano shows a playful sense of irony on 'Happy Birthday,' a deceivingly tuneful ditty about a poor woman who celebrates her birthday in a tenement apartment by listening to the radio and the cats in the alley." Mark Lepage of The Montreal Gazette wrote, "The music [on Free] has a particularly L.A. feel, half beauty and half grit that sticks to you in the heat, typified by 'Happy Birthday,' one of those perfect marriages of melody and rock 'n' roll consummated in just over two minutes."

== Formats ==
7-inch single (UK, Europe, Canada and Australia)
No.	Title	Length
1.	"Happy Birthday"	2:18
2.	"Run, Run, Run"	3:59

7-inch single (Canada promo)
No.	Title	Length
1.	"Happy Birthday"	2:18
2.	"Happy Birthday"	2:18

Cassette single (Australia)
No.	Title	Length
1.	"Happy Birthday"	2:18
2.	"Run, Run, Run"	3:59

12-inch single (UK and Europe) and CD single (UK and Germany)
No.	Title	Length
1.	"Happy Birthday"	2:18
2.	"Run, Run, Run"	3:59
3.	"Free"	3:11

== Personnel ==
Credits are adapted from the UK CD single liner notes and the Free CD album booklet.

"Happy Birthday"

- Johnette Napolitano – vocals
- Jim Mankey – guitars
- Allan Bloch – bass
- Harry Rushakoff – drums

Production

- Concrete Blonde – producers (all tracks)
- Earle Mankey – recording (all tracks), producer ("Free")
- Chris Tsangarides – mixing (all tracks)

Other

- Anne Sperling – photography
- Johnette Napolitano – sleeve design

== Charts ==
Chart (1989)	Peak position
Australia (ARIA Charts)	81
Canada Top Singles (RPM)	82
