= Heal It Up =

Single by Concrete Blonde

from the album Mexican Moon
- Released: 1993
- Length: 4:21 (album version); 3:58 (edit)
- Label: Capitol, I.R.S.
- Songwriter: Johnette Napolitano
- Producers: Concrete Blonde; Sean Freehill

Concrete Blonde singles chronology
"Jonestown" (1993)	"Heal It Up" (1993)	"Mexican Moon" (1993)

"Heal It Up" is a song from American rock band Concrete Blonde, released in 1993 as the second single from their fifth studio album, Mexican Moon (1993). The song was written by Johnette Napolitano, and produced by Concrete Blonde and Sean Freehill.

In the US, "Heal It Up" was the second promotional single to be released from Mexican Moon, following "Jonestown". "Heal It Up" was released to target album rock and commercial alternative radio. The song reached number 16 on the US Billboard Modern Rock Tracks chart in November 1993.

== Music video ==
The song's music video was directed by Jane Williams. It reached number 46 on the Billboard Video Monitor list for MTV for the week ending December 12, 1993, which recorded the top 50 most played clips on the channel.

== Critical reception ==
On its release, Music & Media wrote, "Slowly building into a crescendo, not unlike Simple Minds in their golden years, Napolitano tells a tormented tale of lost souls in need of healing. Wait for the cinematic bridge." In a retrospective on the music of 1993, Don Mayhew of The Fresno Bee picked "Heal It Up" as one of his song selections and commented, "The best bellow of the year goes to Napolitano, who whispers, stomps and soars through this."

In a review of Mexican Moon, Gerry Krochak of the Regina Leader-Post noted how the song's "subdued electric verse builds into an intense chorus". He added, "More thrilling guitar work and Napolitano's vocals complement each other brilliantly on what is perhaps the album's finest cut." Chuck Campbell of The Knoxville News Sentinel felt the song, "though meandering, offers satisfaction in its gritty execution".

== Formats ==
Cassette and CD single (Australia)
No.	Title	Length
1.	"Heal It Up"	3:59
2.	"Simple Twist of Fate"	5:46

CD single (Netherlands #1)
No.	Title	Notes	Length
1.	"Heal It Up"	Edit	3:58
2.	"Jonestown"	LP Version	6:06

CD single (Netherlands #2)
No.	Title	Notes	Length
1.	"Heal It Up"	Edit	3:58
2.	"Jonestown"	LP Version	6:06
3.	"Simple Twist of Fate"		5:40
4.	"Side of the Road"		4:37

CD single (US promo)
No.	Title	Notes	Length
1.	"Heal It Up"	Edit	3:58

== Personnel ==
Credits are adapted from the Australian CD single liner notes and the Mexican Moon CD album booklet.

Heal It Up

- Johnette Napolitano – vocals, guitars, bass
- Paul Thompson – drums, timpani

Production

- Concrete Blonde – producers ("Heal It Up")
- Sean Freehill – producer ("Heal It Up"), recording ("Heal It Up"), engineer ("Simple Twist of Fate"), mixing ("Simple Twist of Fate")
- Johnette Napolitano, James Mankey – producers ("Simple Twist of Fate")
- Tim Palmer – mixing ("Heal It Up")
- Mark O'Donoughue, Jamie Seyberth – mixing assistants ("Heal It Up")
- Ted Jensen – mastering ("Heal It Up")

== Charts ==
Chart (1993)	Peak position
Australia (ARIA Charts)	86
Canada Top Singles (RPM)	67
US Alternative Airplay (Billboard)	16
