= Pretty & Twisted =

Studio album by Pretty & Twisted
- Released: 1995
- Genre: Alternative rock
- Label: Warner Bros.
- Producer: Johnette Napolitano

Pretty & Twisted is the only album by the American band Pretty & Twisted, released in 1995.

Pretty & Twisted is dedicated to Marlon Brando. The album's first single was "¡Ride!", which was written by Johnette Napolitano and Chris Bailey. The band supported the album by touring with the Young Dubliners.

== Production ==
The album was produced by Johnette Napolitano; it began as a solo project, with Napolitano initially recording in her home. "Mother of Pearl" is a cover of the Roxy Music song. "Come Away with Me" incorporates unrecorded lyrics written by Janis Joplin. "Singing Is Fire" is a Charles Bukowski poem set to music; "Stranger" was written with Paul Westerberg.

== Critical reception ==
Professional ratings
Review scores
Source	Rating
AllMusic	4/5 stars
Calgary Herald	B−
The Indianapolis Star	2.5/4 stars
Knoxville News Sentinel	3.5/5 stars
Los Angeles Times	3.5/4 stars
MusicHound Rock: The Essential Album Guide	1/5 stars

Trouser Press wrote that, "while Pretty & Twisted simplifies things and cuts away the artsier pretensions of latter-day Concrete Blonde, it replaces them with dopier ego indulgences." The Los Angeles Times thought that "there's something both Bowie-esque and Cure-like in the band's aggressively ominous atmospherics—a sound with the grit and the grace to make the edge of desperation seem like the only place to be." The Hamilton Spectator declared that "Napolitano's experience certainly gives Pretty & Twisted a decided advantage as one of the better debut albums to come around in a while."

The Knoxville News Sentinel determined that, "for all the intrigue of the lyrics and singing, Pretty & Twisted only sporadically gets substantial instrumental support." The Calgary Herald concluded that "many of these songs lay lifelessly in the cauldron, although the ones that do work roar out spitting and smoking." The Indianapolis Star opined that "much of this new disc runs flat, with dark tracks bearing well-worn sentiments."

AllMusic called the album "a wonderful slice of adult alternative rock that is both melodic and intelligent."

== Track listing ==
All tracks are written by Johnette Napolitano except where noted.

No.	Title	Writer(s)	Length
1.	"The Highs Are Too High"		6:10
2.	"Mother of Pearl"	Bryan Ferry	5:05
3.	"Souvenir"		5:09
4.	"No Daddy No"		4:34
5.	"¡Ride!"	Chris Bailey, Napolitano	3:40
6.	"Train Song (Edge of Desperation)"	Marc Moreland, Napolitano	6:30
7.	"Stranger"	Paul Westerberg, Napolitano	2:59
8.	"Singing Is Fire"	Charles Bukowski, Napolitano, Moreland	3:11
9.	"Don't Take Me Down"		4:37
10.	"Come Away with Me"	Janis Joplin, Napolitano	5:55
11.	"Dear Marlon Brando"	Moreland, Napolitano	3:30
12.	"Billy"	Moreland, Napolitano	3:39
13.	"Watching the Water"		4:17

== Personnel ==
Credits are adapted from the Pretty & Twisted CD album booklet.

- Johnette Napolitano – vocals (1–13), bass (1–13), keyboards (1, 5–7, 11, 13), guitars (1, 3, 9–10), beat (1, 9–10, 13), percussion (2–3, 5–6, 8–11, 13)
- Marc Moreland – guitars (1–13), vocals (4, 11), keyboards (8)
- Danny Montgomery – drums (2–8, 11–12)
- Chris Bailey – guitars (5)

Production

- Johnette Napolitano – producer, engineer
- Earle Mankey – engineer (1–13), mixing (1–12)
- Alex Gordon – engineer (1–13), mixing (13)
- Sean Freehill – engineer, sampling, sequencing
- Anne Catalano – assistant engineer
- Danny, Jeff and Susan at Paramount – additional assistants
- Tom Baker – mastering

Other

- Bruce Poulsen – cover photography
- Johnette Napolitano, Marc Moreland – additional photos
- William Herron III – logo
- Brigid Pearson – assemblage
