= Mexican Moon =

Studio album by Concrete Blonde
- Released: October 19, 1993
- Genres: Alternative rock; gothic rock
- Length: 62:28
- Label: IRS Records (later reissued by Capitol Records)
- Producer: Concrete Blonde with Sean Freehill

Concrete Blonde chronology
Walking in London (1992)	Mexican Moon (1993)	Still in Hollywood (1994)

Singles from Mexican Moon
- 1. "Jonestown" Released: 1993; 2. "Heal It Up" Released: 1993; 3. "Mexican Moon" Released: 1993

Professional ratings
Review scores
Source	Rating
AllMusic	3.5/5 stars
Chicago Tribune	3/4 stars
Los Angeles Times	2.5/4 stars

Mexican Moon is the fifth studio album by alternative rock band Concrete Blonde.

Mexican Moon takes the gothic rock of the previous albums and adds more of a hard rock edge to it. Johnette Napolitano provided the vocals, bass guitar, samples, and the album artwork. Paul Thompson played drums and James Mankey played guitar.

"Jenny I Read" details the rise to stardom and subsequent fall into happy obscurity of a fashion model (rumoured to be Bettie Page), while "Mexican Moon" finds Napolitano singing about a failed romance and fleeing into Mexico. The song "Jonestown" is a critique of the theology surrounding the Jonestown Massacre and opens with a minute-long sample of Jim Jones ranting about warfare. "End of the Line" is a Roxy Music song, written by Bryan Ferry and released on Siren.

On the closing track, "Bajo la Lune Mexicana," Napolitano (who does not speak Spanish) wrote the Spanish lyrics, which are a literal translation of the lyrics to the album's title track. However, none of the verbs are conjugated, noun gender is ignored, and correct grammar is non-existent; it doesn't detract from the overall translation from Spanish to English.

== Critical reception ==
People wrote that "even in its quieter moments, Mexican Moon seethes with emotion." Trouser Press wrote: "Napolitano — who is still a mighty bad singer and doesn’t seem to know it — gives her headstrong, knicker-twisting all to the effort, and very nearly gets by on sheer gumption."

== Track listing ==
All songs written by Johnette Napolitano, except where noted.

No.	Title	Writer(s)	Length
1.	"Jenny I Read"		5:20
2.	"Mexican Moon"		5:03
3.	"Heal It Up"		4:21
4.	"Jonestown"		6:09
5.	"Rain"	James Mankey, Napolitano, Murphy	3:28
6.	"I Call It Love"	Mankey, Napolitano	5:17
7.	"Jesus Forgive Me (For the Things I'm About To Say)"		5:17
8.	"When You Smile"	Steve Wynn	4:21
9.	"Close To Home"		3:32
10.	"One of My Kind"	Napolitano, Texacala Jones	3:55
11.	"End of the Line"	Bryan Ferry	4:41
12.	"(Love Is a) Blind Ambition"		6:15
13.	"Bajo la Lune Mexicana"		5:07

== Personnel ==
Credits are adapted from the Mexican Moon CD album booklet.

Concrete Blonde

- Johnette Napolitano – vocals (all tracks), guitars (tracks 1, 3, 5, 7–8, 12), bass (tracks 1, 3–4, 7–8), keyboards (track 12), percussion (tracks 6–7, 9, 11), electric guitar (tracks 2, 13), piano (track 9)
- James Mankey – guitars (tracks 1, 4–12), bass (tracks 2, 5–6, 9–11, 13), guitar synthesizer (tracks 6–7, 11), vocals (track 9), Spanish guitar (tracks 2, 13), acoustic guitar (tracks 2, 13), additional voices (track 4)
- Paul Thompson – drums (tracks 3–9, 11–12), timpani (tracks 3, 5), percussion (tracks 6–7)

Additional musicians

- Harry Rushakoff – drums (tracks 1–2, 10, 13)
- Andy Prieboy – additional voices (track 4), additional piano (track 9), piano (track 12)
- Jeff Trott – additional voices (track 4)
- Texacala Jones – vocals (track 10)

Production

- Concrete Blonde – producer
- Sean Freehill – producer, recording, additional drum programming
- Alex Gordon, Robert Fayer – recording assistance
- Earle Mankey – additional recording
- Robert Read – additional recording assistance
- Tim Palmer – mixing
- Mark O'Donoghue, Jamie Seyberth – assistant mixers
- Ted Jensen – mastering

Other

- Johnette Napolitano – paintings, photographs
- Stephen Stickler – band photograph
- Brigid Pearson – cover design, assemblage

== Charts ==
Chart (1993)	Peak position
Australian Albums (ARIA)	53
Canada Top Albums/CDs (RPM)	36
US Billboard 200	67
