= Caroline (Concrete Blonde song) =

Single by Concrete Blonde

from the album Bloodletting
- Released: September 10, 1990
- Length: 5:30 (album version); 4:03 (edit)
- Label: I.R.S.
- Songwriter: Johnette Napolitano
- Producers: Concrete Blonde; Chris Tsangarides

Concrete Blonde singles chronology
"Everybody Knows" (1990)	"Caroline" (1990)	"Tomorrow, Wendy" (1991)

Music video
- "Caroline" on YouTube

"Caroline" is a song from American alternative rock band Concrete Blonde, released in September 1990 as the third single from their third studio album, Bloodletting (1990). The song was written by Johnette Napolitano, and produced by Concrete Blonde and Chris Tsangarides. The song reached number 23 on the US Billboard Modern Rock Tracks chart.

== Critical reception ==
Mike Boehm, writing for the Los Angeles Times, described "Caroline" as "a mysterious, gorgeously evocative song that recalls Fleetwood Mac's 'Rhiannon'." In a review of Bloodletting', Marc D. Allan of The Indianapolis Star wrote, "'Caroline' is a good example of the band's strengths. Napolitano's lush vocals, combined with Mankey's eerie guitar, create a subtle but powerful piece of pop." In a retrospective review, Ned Raggett of AllMusic described the song's lyrics as "addressing a departed friend".

== Music video ==
The song's music video was directed by Rupert Nadeau and produced by Liz Wartenberg. It achieved medium rotation on MTV.

== Track listings ==
7-inch single (Australia and Europe)
No.	Title	Notes	Length
1.	"Caroline"	Edit	4:03
2.	"Days and Days"		3:12

Cassette single (Australia and Canada)
No.	Title	Notes	Length
1.	"Caroline"	Edit	4:03
2.	"Days and Days"		3:12

12-inch and CD single (Europe)
No.	Title	Notes	Length
1.	"Caroline"	Edit	4:03
2.	"Days and Days"		3:12
3.	"Roses Grow"	Live	3:05

CD single (US)
No.	Title	Notes	Length
1.	"Caroline"	Edit	4:03
2.	"Roses Grow"	Live	3:05
3.	"Tomorrow, Wendy"	Live	4:26
4.	"The Sky Is a Poisonous Garden"	Live	4:15
5.	"Little Wing"		4:15

== Personnel ==
Credits are adapted from the US and European CD single liner notes and the Bloodletting CD album booklet.

Caroline

- Johnette Napolitano – vocals, bass
- James Mankey – guitars
- Paul Thompson – drums

Production

- Concrete Blonde – producers ("Caroline", "Days and Days", "Little Wing")
- Chris Tsangarides – producer ("Caroline", "Days and Days")
- Earle Mankey, James Mankey – additional recording and mixing ("Caroline", "Days and Days")
- Chris Marshall – production assistance ("Caroline", "Days and Days")
- Rob Bingston – recording and mixing (live tracks only)
- John Golden – mastering

== Charts ==
Chart (1990–1991)	Peak position
Australia (ARIA)	39
Canada Top Singles (RPM)	22
Netherlands (Dutch Top 40 Tipparade)	18
Netherlands (Single Top 100)	57
US Modern Rock Tracks (Billboard)	23
US Cash Box Top 100 Singles	84
