= Mojave (album) =

Studio album by Concrete Blonde
- Released: June 29, 2004
- Genre: Alternative rock
- Label: Eleven Thirty

Concrete Blonde chronology
Live in Brazil 2002 (2003)	Mojave (2004)	The Essential (2005)

Professional ratings
Review scores
Source	Rating
AllMusic	3/5 stars

Mojave is the seventh and final studio album by alternative rock band Concrete Blonde.

== Track listing ==
No.	Title	Length
1.	"The 'A' Road"	4:22
2.	"Because I Can"	4:29
3.	"True to This"	3:27
4.	"Ghost Riders in the Sky"	5:12
5.	"Hey Coyote"	3:54
6.	"Himalayan Motorcycles"	3:48
7.	"Mojave"	5:00
8.	"Snakes"	4:43
9.	"Jim Needs an Animal"	3:27
10.	"Someone's Calling Me"	4:20
11.	"My Tornado at Rest"	4:51
