= No Talking, Just Head =

Studio album by the Heads
- Released: October 8, 1996
- Recorded: November 1994 to late 1995
- Studios: The Boundary, London, England, UK; Clubhouse, Cock Island, Connecticut, US; G, London, England, UK; The Gentleman's Club, Miami Beach, Florida, US; Paramount, Hollywood, California, US
- Genres: New wave, art punk, art rock
- Length: 55:11
- Label: MCA
- Producer: The Heads

Singles from No Talking, Just Head
- 1. "Don't Take My Kindness for Weakness" Released: Oct 1996 (UK/Europe); 2. "Damage I've Done" Released: Nov 1996 (US/Europe)

No Talking, Just Head is the only studio album by the Heads, a band composed of Jerry Harrison, Tina Weymouth, and Chris Frantz of Talking Heads, joined by a variety of guest singers. Released in October 1996, the project was commercially and critically unsuccessful. The band members went on to pursue other musical interests.

== Recording and release ==
The Talking Heads instrumentalists began recording the album in late 1994 after spending several years trying to get vocalist David Byrne to participate. The title track was first released on the soundtrack to Virtuosity, with recording continuing through 1995, as friends and musical acquaintances filled in as guest vocalists. The album was intended to turn into a full-time project with further studio albums and a tour, culminating with a live CD/video release of the first tour, featuring performances of songs originally recorded by Talking Heads reinterpreted by the album's guest artists. However, Byrne sued the group, asserting that their name and presentation were too evocative of Talking Heads and that this release was a trademark violation. The suit was settled out of court and only the studio album was released. The band toured the US in late 1996, with Johnette Napolitano serving as the primary lead vocalist.

"Damage I've Done" and "Don't Take My Kindness for Weakness" were released as singles, including several remixes by Moby, Lunatic Calm and others. Both were promoted with music videos.

== Critical reception ==
Stephen Thomas Erlewine of AllMusic wrote that the collaborators were "as barren of ideas as the Heads themselves", and that most of the music, bar the tracks with Andy Partridge and Shaun Ryder, was "simply bland". Keith Phipps of The A.V. Club wrote that the songs were "alternately derivative of [the band's] former work and derivative of current musical trends", and that the "crushing mediocrity" of the music was only punctuated by the Partridge song. Robert Christgau rated the album a B− and called it a "turkey", stating that it was not as bad as he expected, and that the music was strongest when sounding like Talking Heads and Tom Tom Club. Chris Molanphy of CMJ New Music Monthly wrote that the musicians were "just fine" without Byrne and felt the strength of the music came from the rhythm section. A brief review from E! called the album "frighteningly catchy" and just as "gimmicky" as Talking Heads' work. Dom Stud of Melody Maker noted that most of the album's guests "contribute a strong identity", with some "even managing to inject new life into the tired trio", and concluded, "All in all, No Talking, Just Head works as a series of cameos. That so many hit the mark should be considered a triumph."

A review of "Damage I've Done" in Billboard recommended the track to retailers as having sales potential for being a "murky, oddly appealing rocker" that was "derivative but undoubtedly hit-bound".

== Track listing ==
All songs written by Chris Frantz, Jerry Harrison, Tina Weymouth and T. "Blast" Murray; other lyricists in parentheses.

1. "Damage I've Done" (lyrics, vocals: Johnette Napolitano) – 6:19
2. "The King Is Gone" (lyrics, vocals: Michael Hutchence) – 4:12
3. "No Talking, Just Head" (vocals: Debbie Harry) – 4:34
4. "Never Mind" (lyrics, vocals: Richard Hell) – 3:51
5. "No Big Bang" (lyrics, vocals: Maria McKee) – 3:30
6. "Don't Take My Kindness for Weakness" (lyrics, vocals: Shaun Ryder; vocals: Paul "Kermit" Leverage) – 4:43
7. "No More Lonely Nights" (lyrics, vocals: Malin Anneteg) – 5:14
8. "Indie Hair" (lyrics, vocals: Ed Kowalczyk) – 3:49
9. "Punk Lolita" (vocals: Harry, Napolitano, Weymouth; lyrics: Weymouth) – 4:35
10. "Only the Lonely" (lyrics, vocals: Gordon Gano) – 4:05
11. "Papersnow" (lyrics, vocals: Andy Partridge) – 4:59
12. "Blue Blue Moon" (lyrics, vocals: Gavin Friday; backing vocals: Napolitano) – 5:20

== Personnel ==
Personnel taken from No Talking, Just Head CD booklet.

The Heads

- Chris Frantz – drums (all tracks), loops (3–7, 9, 11), bongos (11), electric saw (12)
- Jerry Harrison – keyboards (1–7, 9–11), guitar (8), piano (12)
- Tina Weymouth – bass guitar (1–4, 6–12), backing vocals (4, 11, 12), keyboard bass (5), vocals (9), keyboard (12)

Additional musicians

- Malin Anneteg – vocals (7)
- Gavin Friday – vocals (12)
- Gordon Gano – vocals (10)
- Debbie Harry – vocals (3, 9)
- Richard Hell – vocals (4)
- Michael Hutchence – vocals (2)
- Ed Kowalczyk – vocals (8)
- Paul "Kermit" Leverage – additional vocals (6)
- Abdou M'Boup – percussion (2, 4)
- Maria McKee – vocals, guitar, and synthesizer (5)
- T. Blast Murray – guitar (all tracks)
- Johnette Napolitano – vocals (1, 9), buzz guitar (1), backing vocals (2, 4, 12)
- Lenny Pickett – saxophone and treated bamboo flute (2)
- Andy Partridge – vocals and whistling (11)
- Shaun Ryder – vocals (6)

Technical personnel

- Chris Frantz – production, arrangement
- Jerry Harrison – production, arrangement
- Tina Weymouth – production, arrangement, cover artwork, design
- Jeff Gibbs – assistant engineering
- Jules Gondar – assistant engineering
- Alex Gordon – engineering
- Femio Hernández – mixing, mixing assistance
- Heungman – photography
- Ted Jensen – mastering
- Tom Lord-Alge – mixing
- Doug McKean – engineering, mixing
- J. C. Ulloa – assistant engineering

== Chart performance ==
No Talking, Just Head debuted on the CMJ New Music Monthly Top 75 Alternative Radio Airplay in January 1997 at 43 and peaked at 32 the next month.
