= Bloodletting (Concrete Blonde album) =

Studio album by Concrete Blonde
- Released: May 15, 1990
- Recorded: September 1989 – January 1990
- Studios: Battery (London, England)
- Genres: Alternative rock; gothic rock
- Length: 42:11
- Label: I.R.S.
- Producers: Concrete Blonde, Chris Tsangarides

Concrete Blonde chronology
Free (1989)	Bloodletting (1990)	Walking in London (1992)

Singles from Bloodletting
- 1. "Bloodletting (The Vampire Song)" Released: 1990; 2. "Joey" Released: May 21, 1990; 3. "Caroline" Released: September 10, 1990; 4. "Tomorrow, Wendy" Released: 1991

Bloodletting is the third studio album by American alternative rock band Concrete Blonde. Released on May 15, 1990, the album features guest appearances by R.E.M.'s Peter Buck and Wall of Voodoo's Andy Prieboy.

Bloodletting peaked at number 8 on the Australian ARIA Charts and was certified gold in 1990. It earned a gold certification from the Recording Industry Association of America (RIAA) the following year.

== Background ==
Concrete Blonde lead vocalist Johnette Napolitano said of the album:

It was pretty miserable. It's not a happy little disc. We had a string of bad luck and [Bloodletting] was the tail end of it. A particularly bad relationship. It had never happened to me until I was 29 years old. I had a hard time getting over it. So, it's not a happy record, but I could do two things: I could make a self-indulgent record, which is what this is, or I could lock up all these songs in a closet and do something that wasn't sincere. This will never happen again, this record.

== Release ==
Bloodletting was released in May 15, 1990.

"Joey" was the band's biggest hit, reaching number one on the Modern Rock Tracks chart and the top 20 of the pop charts. The song reached #2 in Australia while also spending 6 weeks at #3.

=== Critical reception ===
Professional ratings
Review scores
Source	Rating
AllMusic	4.5/5 stars
Chicago Tribune	3/4 stars
Entertainment Weekly	A−
Los Angeles Times	3.5/5 stars
Record Collector	4/5 stars

Elizabeth Wurtzel, in her review of the album for New York magazine, called the album "not nearly as likable or far-ranging" as the band's preceding album, Free, "though it's deeper and more focused."

== 2010 re-issue ==
On July 13, 2010, Shout! Factory released the 20th anniversary edition of Bloodletting. This re-issue features six bonus tracks: "I Want You", "Little Wing", the French extended version of "Bloodletting (The Vampire Song)" and live versions of "Roses Grow", "The Sky Is a Poisonous Garden" and "Tomorrow, Wendy".

== Track listing ==
All tracks are written by Johnette Napolitano, except as noted.

No.	Title	Writer(s)	Length
1.	"Bloodletting (The Vampire Song)"		6:04
2.	"The Sky Is a Poisonous Garden"	Napolitano, Bruce Moreland	2:36
3.	"Caroline"		5:30
4.	"Darkening of the Light"		3:24
5.	"I Don't Need a Hero"		4:25
6.	"Days and Days"		3:12
7.	"The Beast"		3:52
8.	"Lullabye"		3:56
9.	"Joey"		4:07
10.	"Tomorrow, Wendy"	Andy Prieboy	5:05

20th Anniversary Edition bonus tracks
No.	Title	Writer(s)	Length
11.	"I Want You" (B-side of "Joey")		3:28
12.	"Little Wing" (from "Caroline" maxi-single)	Jimi Hendrix	4:15
13.	"Bloodletting (The Vampire Song)" (French version from European maxi-single)		7:06
14.	"Roses Grow" (Live at the Malibu Nightclub on Long Island for WDRE) (from "Caroline" maxi-single)		3:05
15.	"The Sky Is a Poisonous Garden" (Live at the Malibu Nightclub on Long Island for WDRE) (from "Caroline" maxi-single)	Napolitano, Bruce Moreland	4:15
16.	"Tomorrow, Wendy" (Live at the Malibu Nightclub on Long Island for WDRE) (from "Caroline" maxi-single)	Andy Prieboy	4:26

== Personnel ==
- Johnette Napolitano – vocals, bass guitar, production, album cover
- James Mankey – guitars, bass guitar, production, additional recording and mixing
- Paul Thompson – drums, production

Technical

- Chris Tsangarides – production, recording, engineering
- Chris Marshall – production assistance
- Earle Mankey and James Mankey – additional recording and mixing
- Hugh Brown, Jim Yousling, Johnette Napolitano – album cover
- Evren Göknar – mastering (20th Anniversary Edition)

Additional personnel

- Peter Buck – mandolin on "Darkening of the Light"
- Andy Prieboy – keyboards on "Tomorrow, Wendy"
- Gail Ann Dorsey – bass guitar on "Tomorrow, Wendy"
- Steve Wynn – vocals on "Bloodletting (the Vampire song)"
- John Keane – slide guitar on "Darkening of the Light"

Peter and John recorded at John Keane Studio, Athens GA

Additional notes

- This record is dedicated to Ron Scarselli with love.

== Charts ==
Chart (1990)	Peak position
Australian Albums (ARIA)	8
Canada Top Albums/CDs (RPM)	4
US Billboard 200	49
US Cash Box Top 200 Albums	44

== Certifications ==
Region	Certification	Certified units/sales
Australia (ARIA)	Gold	35,000^{^}
United States (RIAA)	Gold	500,000^{^}
^{^} Shipments figures based on certification alone.
