= Still in Hollywood (song) =

Single by Concrete Blonde

from the album Concrete Blonde
- Released: December 1986
- Genre: Alternative rock
- Length: 3:42
- Label: I.R.S.
- Songwriter(s): Johnette Napolitano
- Producer(s): Earle Mankey; Concrete Blonde

Concrete Blonde singles chronology
"Still in Hollywood" (1986)	"True" (1987)

"Still in Hollywood" is the debut single by American rock band Concrete Blonde, released in 1986 from their self-titled debut studio album. The song was written by Johnette Napolitano, and produced by Earle Mankey and Concrete Blonde.

== Background ==
"Still in Hollywood" was released in December 1986 as Concrete Blonde's debut single after they signed to I.R.S. Records earlier in the year. I.R.S. launched the band with the release of the single and its video which, according to the label's vice president of sales, Barbara Bolan, allowed them to introduce the band at their "street-level best". The single and the band's self-titled debut album were successful in gaining the band a large cult following.

Speaking of the song's reception, including at the band's live shows, Napolitano told the LA Weekly in 1987, "It's the weirdest thing in the world seeing kids in Toronto singing that song. Kids love it. In Syracuse, we asked some guys why they sang that song, and they went, 'cause it rocks, man!' Even people who've never been to Hollywood identify with it. And kids come up and say they hate the towns they live in, and even apologize for their towns."

== Music video ==
The song's music video was directed by Jane Simpson and produced by Tina Silvey. It was shot on location in Hollywood over the course of three days. Napolitano told the Sun-Sentinel in 1987, "It was a lot of fun, it practically made itself. It was really a blast." The footage includes Napolitano's own residence which had been condemned and was expected to collapse due to land movement. Napolitano had to vacate the house around the time the band signed to I.R.S. Records.

The video achieved light rotation on MTV and peaked at number 30 in the US Cash Box Top 40 Music Videos chart in March 1987. Speaking to Billboard in 1987, Napolitano said of the video's success, "We didn't bend over backward to get on MTV by putting chicks in bikinis in our video. I.R.S. really made the video for the college market, and they didn't expect it to get played on MTV at all. They were surprised."

== Critical reception ==
On its release, Kent Zimmerman of The Gavin Report described "Still in Hollywood" as a "rocker" and added, "Those of us into mass urban transit will relate to the lunacy depicted in the lyrics and brash chord work." Terry Atkinson of the Los Angeles Times described the song as "one of the best love-hate odes ever recorded about Hollywood" and noted its "punk/pop energy". Discussing the song's music video, which he gave a rating of 85 out of 100, he drew comparisons to director Jane Simpson's previous work on the video for Thelonious Monster's "Try", noting how she "applie[s] the same dizzying approach" to "Still in Hollywood". He wrote, "Simpson's anything-goes camera is constantly zooming and tilting and moving from one location to another, and into the predominant grainy black-and-white imagery she throws speeded-up effects, frantic editing, color animation and a whole lot else."

Jim Farber of the Daily News noted the song's "vintage late-'70s spunk" and added that Napolitano "helps considerably [by] conjuring up a combination of Martha Davis and Poly Styrene". He also commented on the "slash-'n'-burn style" video, which he felt was "aided by effectively ratty black-and-white photography" and "manages to block the sunshine from its L.A. setting and show you the Hollywood underneath". Gene Armstrong of The Arizona Daily Star praised the "pleasing" song's "maelstrom of tense, angry emotions, which are lent a stabilizing air by Napolitano's uneasy resolve". He was also favorable of the video, noting the "beautiful" and "grainy" footage with its "churning montages of spinning camera angles, fish-eye lens shots and rapid-fire footage". He added that the "raw, amateurish animation looks like graffiti on the screen".

In a review of Concrete Blonde, Greg Burliuk of The Kingston Whig-Standard noted how the band's "street-wise lyrics verge on the poetic" and described "Still in Hollywood" as "a vivid portrayal of street life in Tinsel Town". William Ruhlmann retrospectively wrote for AllMusic, "The song borders on punk rock, as Mankey repeats the same riff over and over and Napolitano spits out the angry lyric like Exene Cervenka."

== Formats ==
7-inch single
No.	Title	Length
1.	"Still in Hollywood"	3:42
2.	"Cold Part of Town"	3:10

7-inch promotional single (US)
No.	Title	Length
1.	"Still in Hollywood"	3:42
2.	"Still in Hollywood"	3:42

12-inch promotional single
No.	Title	Notes	Length
1.	"Still in Hollywood"	Censored	3:42
2.	"Still in Hollywood"	Uncensored	3:42
3.	"It'll Chew You Up and Spit You Out"		4:24

== Personnel ==
Credits are adapted from the US 7-inch and 12-inch sleeve notes.

Concrete Blonde

- Johnette Napolitano – vocals, bass
- James Mankey – guitars, bass
- Harry Rushakoff – drums

Production

- Earle Mankey, Concrete Blonde – producers

Other

- Johnette Napolitano, Ron Scarselli – sleeve design
- Scott Lindgren – photography
