= Free (Concrete Blonde album) =

Studio album by Concrete Blonde
- Released: April 1989
- Recorded: 1988
- Genres: Alternative rock; hard rock
- Length: 33:15
- Labels: I.R.S. (remastered and re-released in 2004 by Superfecta Recordings)
- Producer: Concrete Blonde

Concrete Blonde chronology
| Concrete Blonde (1986) | Free (1989) | Bloodletting (1990) |

Free is the second album by alternative rock band Concrete Blonde. It marked the addition of bass player Alan Bloch.

Free peaked at number 90 on the Australian ARIA Charts.

== Critical reception ==
Professional ratings
Review scores
| Source | Rating |
|---|---|
| AllMusic | 3/5 stars |
| Hi-Fi News & Record Review | B:2 |

Chris Murray, reviewer of RPM, considered that "this album has something to please everybody" and it "sounding better with each listen." In the end he expressed a hope that this LP "will eventually get the proper recognition." Tom Demalton of AllMusic gave a mostly positive review of Free, proclaiming it a "worthwhile follow-up" showing "considerable amount of growth in both the songwriting and playing" since the debut album.

== Track listing ==
All songs written by Johnette Napolitano, except where noted.

| No. | Title | Writer(s) | Length |
|---|---|---|---|
| 1. | "God Is a Bullet" | James Mankey, Napolitano | 4:23 |
| 2. | "Run Run Run" | | 4:00 |
| 3. | "It's Only Money" | Phil Lynott | 2:45 |
| 4. | "Help Me" | | 2:42 |
| 5. | "Sun" | | 2:36 |
| 6. | "Roses Grow" | | 3:15 |
| 7. | "Scene of a Perfect Crime" | | 4:42 |
| 8. | "Happy Birthday" | | 2:22 |
| 9. | "Little Conversations" | | 2:48 |
| 10. | "Carry Me Away" | | 3:42 |

== Personnel ==
- Produced by Concrete Blonde
- Recorded by E.J. Mankey II
- Megamix by Chris Tsangarides
- Cover design by Johnette Napolitano & Anne Sperling
- Paintings and photographs by Anne Sperling
- All songs by Concrete Blonde except "It's Only Money" by Phil Lynott
- Write to Concrete Blonde c/o Happy Hermit, 6520 Selma Ave, #567, L.A., CALIF 90028
- Band members: Harry Rushakoff, James Mankey, Johnette Napolitano, Alan Bloch

== Charts ==
| Chart (1989–90) | Peak position |
|---|---|
| Australian Albums (ARIA Charts) | 90 |
| Canada Top Albums/CDs (RPM) | 75 |
| US Billboard 200 | 148 |
