= Tomorrow Wendy =

Song by Andy Prieboy

Single by Andy Prieboy

from the album ...Upon My Wicked Son
- Released: 1990
- Length: 4:40 (album version); 3:35 (radio edit)
- Label: Doctor Dream Records (US); Musidisc, Intercord (Germany)
- Songwriter: Andy Prieboy
- Producer: Andy Prieboy

Andy Prieboy singles chronology
"Tomorrow Wendy" (1990)	"Shine" (2008)

"Tomorrow Wendy" is a song written and originally recorded by American singer-songwriter Andy Prieboy. Released in 1990 as the lead single from his first solo album ...Upon My Wicked Son, Prieboy recorded the song as a duet with Johnette Napolitano. In 1990, Napolitano would also record the song with her band Concrete Blonde for their third studio album Bloodletting.

== Writing ==
"Tomorrow Wendy" was inspired by the suicide of a woman who Prieboy had known from a young age when they were both growing up in East Chicago, Indiana. Wendy later turned to prostitution and drugs, and when she was diagnosed with HIV, she decided to die by suicide by taking a heroin overdose rather than go on to die of an AIDS-related disease. Prieboy told the Los Angeles Times in 1991,

"Wendy was the type that just bided her time, took drugs, and took what was offered to her. [Her suicide] was the one big [time] in her life when she took charge. Basically, the song is a conversation she's having with the mirror. These are the feelings of rage that Wendy felt."

Prieboy also took inspiration from the economic state of his hometown when writing the song. He told the Los Angeles Times in 1990, "It's also about the death of a city in the Industrial Age. Places like Gary and Pittsburgh were once the backbones of America, and now it's like the Depression all over again. People have lost their homes – it's the end of a way of life. And there's lots of Wendys out there." The deaths of Prieboy's two grandfathers from cancer was part of the inspiration behind Wendy's questioning of faith in the song, "I watched them go through a long period of rage and anger and atheism, railing at the God they'd worshiped all their life. Sooner or later, they accepted it. Wendy never accepted it."

Prieboy began writing "Tomorrow Wendy" while touring with his band Wall of Voodoo. He wrote a total of 27 verses for the song and then whittled them down to three.

== Recording ==
Prieboy recorded "Tomorrow Wendy" for his first solo album ...Upon My Wicked Son. He felt the song needed a woman's voice in addition to his own and contacted Napolitano, who agreed to provide vocals on the track. Napolitano recalled in 1990, "Andy called me to sing 'Tomorrow Wendy' with him, and I did it, and as I listened to it and listened to it and listened to it I thought, 'This is really important, and the words are incredible'."

== Music video ==
The song's music video was directed by Thomas Mignone and produced by Darci A. Oitman for DOOM Inc. The footage of Prieboy and Napolitano performing the song was shot in Hollywood, whereas the street scenes were shot on location in Hammond, East Chicago and Calumet City. Initially it was intended to shoot the entire video in Hollywood, with Prieboy showing Mignone sketches of the sort of industrial and street scenes he wanted in the video based on his memories of the Calumet Region. Prieboy then suggested that he and the film crew fly out to shoot the footage on location.

The video ends with the following caption: "In the last 4 minutes, one more person has been infected with AIDS."

== Critical reception ==
Upon its release, Andrew Mueller of Melody Maker described "Tomorrow Wendy" as an "uncharacteristically restrained lament for a wearied prostitute as she contemplates death". He added, "Prieboy seems to fancy reinventing himself as a street-level songwriter type with dirt under his nails and holes in his trousers and all that type of thing. The reasonably good news is that, on this evidence, his attempts to do so could well be highly listenable." Trouser Press, however, in a review of ...Upon My Wicked Son, called it "a totally stupid number about mortality."

== Formats ==
12-inch single (US)
No.	Title	Notes	Length
1.	"Tomorrow Wendy"	Radio Edit	3:35
2.	"Tomorrow Wendy"	LP Version	4:40
3.	"To the Dogs"		4:08
4.	"Maybe That's Not Her Head"		3:21

7-inch single (Germany)
No.	Title	Length
1.	"Tomorrow Wendy"	4:40
2.	"On the Road Again"	4:40

12-inch and CD single (Germany)
No.	Title	Length
1.	"Tomorrow Wendy"	4:40
2.	"To the Dogs"	4:07
3.	"Maybe That's Not Her Head"	3:20

== Concrete Blonde version ==
"Tomorrow, Wendy"

Single by Concrete Blonde

from the album Bloodletting
- Released: 1991
- Length: 5:05
- Label: I.R.S.
- Songwriter: Andy Prieboy
- Producers: Concrete Blonde; Chris Tsangarides

Concrete Blonde singles chronology
"Caroline" (1990)	"Tomorrow, Wendy" (1991)	"Ghost of a Texas Ladies' Man" (1992)

In 1990, American alternative rock band Concrete Blonde released their own version of the song on their third studio album Bloodletting. It was released the following year as the fourth and final single from the album, and reached number 66 on Canada's RPM 100 chart in February 1991.

After recording the vocals on Prieboy's version, Napolitano was so moved by the song that she asked for permission to record the song with Concrete Blonde. Napolitano told the Vancouver Sun in 1990, "It was such an intensely important song, I just felt I had to do it [with Concrete Blonde]." She added to The Sydney Morning Herald, "It's probably the most depressing subject we've ever covered but it's just so vital that the message gets across." Prieboy played keyboards on the band's version.

"Tomorrow, Wendy" was the closing track on Bloodletting because the band considered it to be "the blackest song on the record". Through Bloodletting, Concrete Blonde's version of the song preceded the release of Prieboy's recording by a couple of months.

=== Critical reception ===
In a review of Bloodletting, Steve Terrell of The Santa Fe New Mexican described "Tomorrow, Wendy" as "one of the most haunting songs" on the album, with the song maintaining "an atmosphere of sadness and impending doom". In a retrospective review, Ned Raggett of AllMusic noted that Concrete Blonde's version sees Napolitano "deliver [a] bravura performance of the bitter, heartbreaking lyric".

=== Personnel ===
Credits are adapted from the Bloodletting CD album booklet.

Concrete Blonde

- Johnette Napolitano – vocals
- James Mankey – guitars
- Paul Thompson – drums

Additional musicians

- Andy Prieboy – keyboards
- Gail Ann Dorsey – bass

Production

- Concrete Blonde, Chris Tsangarides – producers
- Chris Marshall – production assistance
- Earle Mankey, James Mankey – additional recording and mixing

=== Charts ===
Chart (1991)	Peak position
Canada Top Singles (RPM)	66

== Controversy ==
Both Prieboy's and Concrete Blonde's versions of "Tomorrow Wendy" generated some controversy on release. Prieboy and Napolitano received hate mail by those who considered the song to be anti-Christian. Prieboy dismissed the accusations and told the Los Angeles Times in 1991, "It's not an anti-Christian song in the least. It's just an accurate depiction of someone who's dying without hope, without faith, without family and without friends." Napolitano commented, "To me [the song is] just asking. It's not saying, 'God, you're a bad person.' It's just wondering why." A number of complaints were also received when some US radio stations began playing Concrete Blonde's version.

== Live performances ==
When Prieboy was the opening act for Concrete Blonde in 1990–91, he and Napolitano would perform "Tomorrow Wendy" together. A live performance was recorded in a session for Australian radio station Triple J on 28 November 1990. It was included on the various artists compilation album JJJ Live at the Wireless in 1991. At future concerts, Prieboy would perform the song solo. He told The Age in 1993, "If Johnette [is] not there to sing 'Tomorrow Wendy' I sing it solo. It's a space I reserve for Miss J, she really lifted that song."

A live version by Concrete Blonde, recorded at the Malibu Nightclub in Long Island, was included on the US CD single release of their 1990 song "Caroline". It has also appeared on their 1994 compilation album Still in Hollywood and as a bonus track on the 2010 20th anniversary edition of Bloodletting.
