= The Tearaways =

- Origin: United States
- Genres: Pop, rock
- Years active: 1980–Current
- Labels: Robo Records (Universal): Fried Records (Universal Music Group); Robo Records (Universal Music Group)
- Members: John 'Fin' Finseth (vocals/songwriter/bass); Greg Brallier (vocals/songwriter/guitar); David Hekhouse (Guitars/songwriter); Clem Burke (Drums/songwriter)
- Website: http://www.thetearaways.com, discography, The Tearaways (USA)

The Tearaways are a pop/rock band from Santa Barbara, California with a "British Invasion meets the California Sun" sound. The group was co-founded by primary songwriter, guitarist and vocalist John Finseth in the early 1980s. The group tours worldwide.

== British invasion meets the California Sun sound ==
The Tearaways' music reflects the sounds of the 1960s. Collectively, the Tearaways have been influenced by Tom Petty and Bob Dylan, the Rolling Stones, Creedence Clearwater Revival, The Eagles, Jefferson Airplane, The Who, The Kinks, The Hollies, and Squeeze.

== Cavern Club ==
For their 12th appearance at International Beatleweek Festival, hosted by The Cavern Club, The Tearaways were joined by co-founder of Blondie, Clem Burke.

== Notable performances ==
The Tearaways have performed live at United Nations, Playboy Mansion, Liverpool Philharmonic, Cavern Club - Liverpool, 100 Club - London.
