= Fast Track to Nowhere =

Fast Track to Nowhere: Songs from "Rebel Highway"

Soundtrack album by Various artists
- Released: August 9, 1994
- Genre: Soundtrack
- Length: 37:34
- Label: A&M

Professional ratings
Review scores
Source	Rating
AllMusic	link

Fast Track to Nowhere is the soundtrack album to the series Rebel Highway. Released in 1994, the album features contemporary artists covering classic songs from the 1950s.

== Track listing ==
1. Iggy Pop - "C'mon Everybody" (Jerry Capehart/Eddie Cochran) - 2:10
2. Meat Puppets - "House of Blue Lights" (Don Raye/Freddie Slack) - 4:05
3. Los Lobos - "Lights Out" (Seth David/Mac Rebennack) - 4:50
4. Concrete Blonde - "Endless Sleep" (Dolores Nance/Jody Reynolds) - 4:09
5. Neville Brothers - "Let the Good Times Roll" (Shirley Goodman/Leonard Lee) - 2:23
6. Sheryl Crow - "I'm Going to Be a Wheel Someday"
  (Dave Bartholomew/Fats Domino/Roy Hayes) - 3:38
7. Charlie Sexton - "Race With the Devil" (Tex Davis/Gene Vincent) - 3:57
8. Blues Traveler - "I'm Walkin'" (Dave Bartholomew/Fats Domino) - 2:14
9. Wild Colonials - "Evil" (Muddy Waters) - 4:15
10. The Smithereens - "The Stroll" (Nancy Lee/Clyde Otis) - 3:01
11. Babes in Toyland - "The Girl Can't Help It" (Bobby Troup) - 2:52
