= Concrete Blonde =

American rock band

- Concrete Blonde, 1989 lineup (left to right): Johnette Napolitano, Harry Rushakoff, Alan Bloch and Jim Mankey

Background information
- Also known as: Dream 6 (1982–1986)
- Origin: Los Angeles, California
- Genres: Alternative rock; gothic rock; hard rock; post-punk (early)
- Years active: 1982–1994; 1997 (one-off reunion); 2001–2004; 2010–2012
- Label: I.R.S.
- Past members: Johnette Napolitano; James Mankey; Gabriel Ramirez; Harry Rushakoff; Paul Thompson; Al Bloch

Concrete Blonde was an American rock band from Hollywood, California. They were active from 1982 to 1994 and reunited twice: first from 2001 to 2004, then from 2010 to 2012. They were best known for their album Bloodletting (1990), its top-20 single "Joey", and Johnette Napolitano's distinctive vocal style.

== Career ==
Singer-songwriter and bassist Johnette Napolitano first formed a group with former Sparks bassist James Mankey on guitar in Los Angeles in 1982. Their first recording was the song "Heart Attack," released under the band name Dreamers on the compilation album The D.I.Y. Album (1982). The track was co-produced by James and his brother Earle Mankey, who also programmed the drums. Joined by drummer Michael Murphy, they became Dream 6 and released an eponymous extended play on the independent label Happy Hermit in 1983 (released in France in 1985 by Madrigal). When they signed with I.R.S. Records in 1986, their labelmate Michael Stipe suggested the name Concrete Blonde, describing the contrast between their hard rock music and introspective lyrics. They were joined by drummer Harry Rushakoff on their eponymous debut album.

Their first release was Concrete Blonde (1986), which included their debut single "Still in Hollywood." They added a full-time bass guitarist, Alan Bloch, for their album Free (1989), allowing Napolitano to focus on her singing without the burden of playing bass simultaneously. This album included the college radio hit "God Is a Bullet."

Their third album, Bloodletting (1990), became their most commercially successful, reaching No. 4 in Canada, No. 8 in Australia, and No. 49 in the United States. It was certified gold in both the United States and Australia. Roxy Music drummer Paul Thompson replaced Rushakoff on Bloodletting while Rushakoff was in treatment for drug addiction. Napolitano also reassumed bass duties for the recording, and Bloch does not appear on the album or any subsequent releases. The album was certified gold by the RIAA and included their highest-charting single, "Joey," which spent 21 weeks on the Billboard Top 100 chart, peaking at No. 19 in the United States and No. 2 in Australia.

Walking in London (1992) saw the return of original drummer Rushakoff due to Thompson's immigration issues, while its successor, Mexican Moon (1993), featured the Bloodletting lineup with Thompson back on drums. Neither album achieved the commercial success of Bloodletting, and Napolitano disbanded the group in 1994.

The band reunited in 1997, with Napolitano and Mankey collaborating with the band Los Illegals on the album Concrete Blonde y Los Illegals. The vocals were primarily in Spanish. During live performances, the band altered the refrain of "Still in Hollywood" to "Still in the Barrio" and included covers of Led Zeppelin's "Immigrant Song" and Jimi Hendrix's "Little Wing".

The band reunited once more in 2001 and released the album Group Therapy (2002). The album was recorded in 10 days and featured Rushakoff again on drums. However, Rushakoff was eventually dismissed from the band for repeatedly failing to appear at scheduled performances. Initially replaced on tour by lighting technician Mike Devitt, he was later replaced permanently by Gabriel Ramirez. The album Mojave followed in 2004.

== Retirement and post-retirement ==
On June 5, 2006, Napolitano announced that the band had officially retired. A message on the Concrete Blonde website read: "Thanks to everyone who heard and believed in the music. Music lives on. Keep listening, keep believing, keep dreaming. Like a ripple, the music moves and travels and finds you. Drive to the music, make love to the music, cry to the music. That's why we made it. Long after we're gone, the music will still be there. Thanks to everyone who helped us bring the music to you & thanks to every face and every heart in every audience all over the world."

On July 13, 2010, Shout! Factory released a remastered 20th-anniversary edition of Bloodletting. It features six bonus tracks: "I Want You", "Little Wing", the French extended version of "Bloodletting (The Vampire Song)", and live versions of "Roses Grow", "The Sky Is a Poisonous Garden" and "Tomorrow, Wendy". An error in the packaging of the re-release includes early non-album period photos featuring original drummer Harry Rushakoff, who had been replaced the night before the first studio session for Bloodletting by Roxy Music drummer Paul Thompson. The band supported the reissue with the "20 Years of Bloodletting: The Vampires Rise" tour, which continued through the remainder of the year.

In 2012, the band released the single "Rosalie", with the B-side "I Know the Ghost". In December of that year, they embarked on a brief tour of nine cities, primarily along the East Coast of the United States.

== Artistry ==
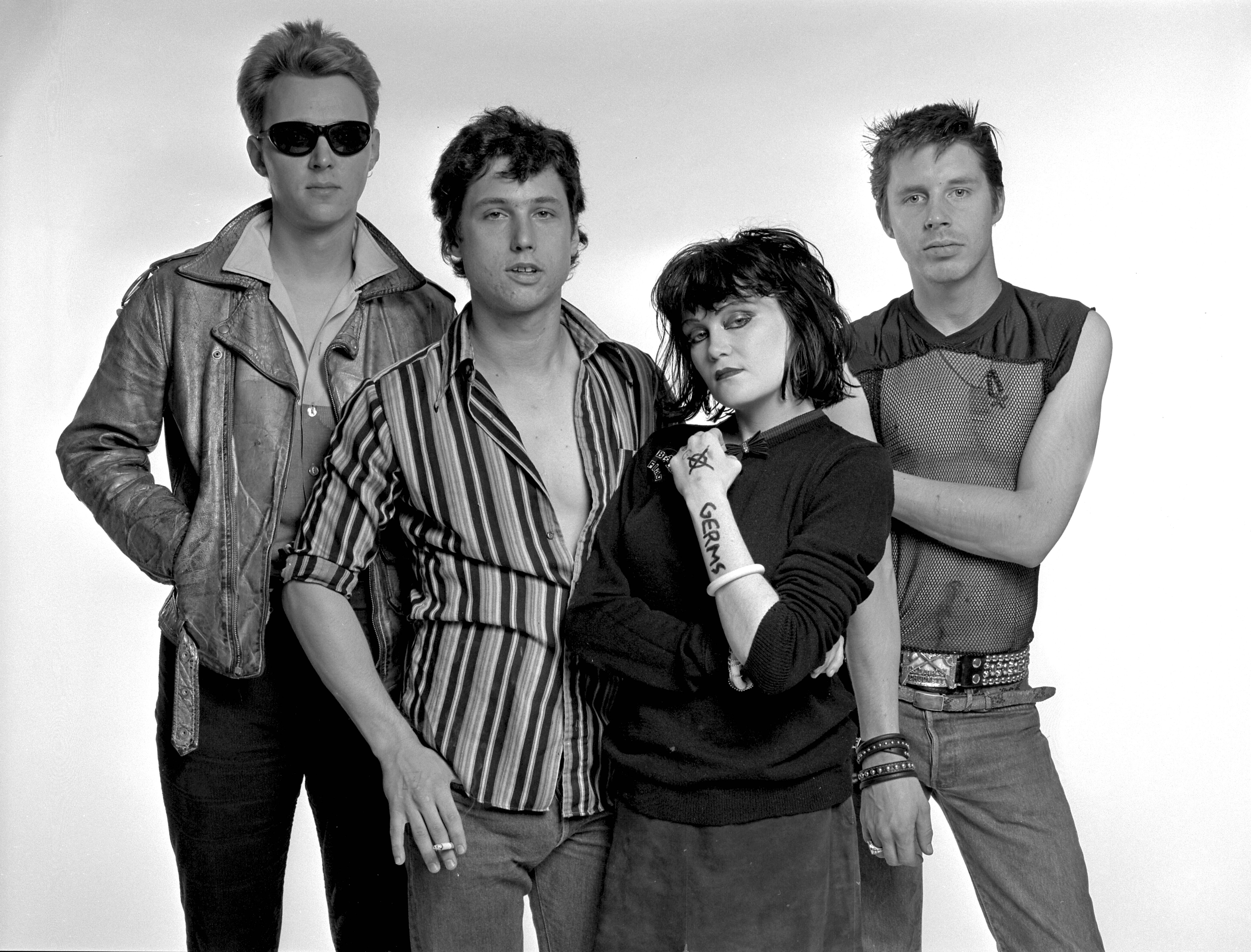
X, another band who emerged from the Los Angeles post-punk scene

Concrete Blonde emerged from the post-punk club circuit that produced bands like X, Wall of Voodoo, and the Go-Go's. This is evident on their releases as Dream 6, and their self-titled debut album. Johnette Napolitano's songwriting and singing draws influence from roots music, as well as Catholic and Mexican imagery, with topics in her music including sex and death. A common theme on Concrete Blonde is her distaste of Hollywood, Los Angeles, her city of residence. She was compared to Patti Smith upon the album's release, but did not know who she was at the time. Instead, she cited Donovan and Linda Ronstadt as influences, and has gone on record for saying she likes to be sexy, but does not see herself as a sex symbol.

As the 1980s progressed, Concrete Blonde transitioned to alternative rock, college rock and hard rock. The band's production value also increased, while Free, their second album, saw minor success due to the single "God Is a Bullet", an alternative song with elements of hard rock and punk. Around this time, Napolitano had been spending a lot of time in New Orleans, Louisiana and reading The Vampire Chronicles series of Gothic vampire novels by American writer Anne Rice. As a result, they shifted to gothic rock during the 1990s, with Jim Allen of uDiscoverMusic coining the term "alt-goth" to describe the band and comparing them to Stevie Nicks.

On top of the gothic-influenced alternative rock, the band's breakthrough album, Bloodletting, draws inspiration from blues on the title track, and arena rock on the hit single, "Joey". Psychological horror is used throughout the album, such as "The Beast", in which the monster that breaks the narrator's heart is a metaphor for a failed relationship. They disbanded in 1994. Three years later, they had a one-off reunion, collaborating with Chicano punk band Los Illegals on Concrete Blonde y Los Illegals, which combined hard rock and Latin music with mostly Spanish lyrics. Jim Allen of uDiscoverMusic summarized the band's musical style as "a sweetly sulfurous blend of goth, punk, and alternative rock."

== Members ==
- Johnette Napolitano – bass, vocals (1982–1994, 2001–2006, 2012)
- James Mankey – guitar (1982–1994, 2001–2006, 2012)
- Harry Rushakoff – drums (1985–1989, 1992, 2001–2002)
- Al Bloch – bass (1988–1989)
- Paul Thompson – drums (1989–1991, 1993–1994)
- Mike Devitt – drums (2002)
- Gabriel Ramirez – drums (2003–2006, 2012)

== Discography ==
=== Studio albums ===
- Concrete Blonde (1986)
- Free (1989)
- Bloodletting (1990)
- Walking in London (1992)
- Mexican Moon (1993)
- Concrete Blonde y Los Illegals (1997) – collaboration with a Los Angeles–based Chicano punk band Los Illegals
- Group Therapy (2002)
- Mojave (2004)

=== Compilation and live albums ===
- Still in Hollywood (1994) – compilation of live recordings, B-sides, and previously unreleased material.
- Recollection: The Best of Concrete Blonde (1996) – compilation of 17 tracks from first five albums, plus live cover version of Mercedes Benz.
- Classic Masters (2002) – 24-bit remastering of 12 tracks from first five albums.
- Live in Brazil 2002 (2003) – double live album.
- The Essential (2005) – includes 14 remastered tracks from first four albums, and a different version of the song "Sun".

=== Non-album tracks ===
- I Want You – B-side on Joey [single] (1990); Point Break soundtrack (1991) – included on 20th anniversary edition of "Bloodletting" album.
- Crystal Blue Persuasion – In Defense of Animals (1993), compilation album.
- Mercedes Benz (Live) (Janis Joplin) – included on Recollection: The Best of Concrete Blonde (1996)
- Endless Sleep (Dolores Nance/Jody Reynolds) – Fast Track to Nowhere (1994), soundtrack album to the series Rebel Highway
- The God in You (MantraMix) – Roxy CD single (2002)
- Joey (live, acoustic) – Live from the CD101 Big Room (Vol. 1) (2003)
- Sun (alternate version) – included on The Essential Concrete Blonde (2005)
- Rosalie / I Know The Ghost (J. Napolitano) – Rosalie [single], 2011

=== Singles ===
Year	Single	Peak chart positions							Album
Year	Single	U.S. Hot 100	U.S. Alt	U.S. Main Rock	AUS	BEL (FLA)	CAN	NED	Album
1986	"Still in Hollywood"	—	—	—	—	—	—	—	Concrete Blonde
1987	"True"	—	—	42	91	—	—	—	Concrete Blonde
1987	"Dance Along the Edge"	—	—	—	—	—	—	—	Concrete Blonde
1989	"God Is a Bullet"	—	15	49	146	—	—	—	Free
1989	"Happy Birthday"	—	—	—	81	—	82	—	Free
1989	"Scene of a Perfect Crime"	—	—	—	—	—	—	—	Free
1990	"Bloodletting (The Vampire Song)"	—	—	—	—	—	—	—	Bloodletting
1990	"Joey"	19	1	20	2	35	4	17	Bloodletting
1990	"Everybody Knows"	—	20	—	—	—	—	—	Pump Up the Volume soundtrack
1990	"Caroline"	—	23	—	39	—	22	57	Bloodletting
1991	"Tomorrow, Wendy"	—	—	—	—	—	66	—	Bloodletting
1992	"Ghost of a Texas Ladies' Man"	—	2	—	31	—	28	—	Walking in London
1992	"Walking in London"	—	—	—	–	19	7	—	Walking in London
1992	"Someday?"	—	8	—	—	—	—	—	Walking in London
1992	"I Wanna Be Your Friend Again"	—	—	—	—	—	—	—	Walking in London
1993	"Jonestown"	—	—	—	—	—	—	—	Mexican Moon
1993	"Heal It Up"	—	16	—	86	—	67	—	Mexican Moon
1993	"Mexican Moon"	—	—	—	—	—	—	—	Mexican Moon
1994	"It'll Chew You Up and Spit You Out"	—	—	—	—	—	—	—	Still in Hollywood
2002	"Take Me Home"	—	—	—	—	—	—	—	Group Therapy
2002	"2x2"	—	—	—	—	—	—	—	non-album single
2002	"Roxy"	—	—	—	—	—	—	—	Group Therapy
2004	"The Real Thing"	—	—	—	—	—	—	—	non-album single
2004	"Rosalie"	—	—	—	—	—	—	—	non-album single
