= God Is a Bullet (song) =

Single by Concrete Blonde

from the album Free
- Released: 1989
- Genre: Alternative rock
- Length: 4:22
- Label: I.R.S.
- Songwriter: Concrete Blonde
- Producer: Concrete Blonde

Concrete Blonde singles chronology
"Dance Along the Edge" (1987)	"God Is a Bullet" (1989)	"Happy Birthday" (1989)

Music video
- "God Is a Bullet" on YouTube

"God Is a Bullet" is a song from American rock band Concrete Blonde, released in 1989 as the lead single from their second studio album, Free (1989). The song was written and produced by the band. "God Is a Bullet" reached number 15 on the US Billboard Modern Rock Tracks chart.

== Background ==
Concrete Blonde were inspired to write an anti-gun song after witnessing shootings and other gun-related incidents first-hand as residents of Los Angeles. The song was written around 1987. Napolitano told The Ottawa Citizen in 1989, "This country has seen too many John Wayne movies. We were rehearsing one day and someone shot all the windows out of my car. Another day I was driving down the street to park it and I saw someone pull a gun on a guy. I had to keep on driving with my head under the dash hoping that he wouldn't come after me because I saw him do it. You hear guns going off all the time. We've become used to it in L.A. which means it's out of hand."

== Music video ==
The song's music video was directed by Jane Simpson. It achieved breakout rotation on MTV, but received some resistance from the channel, who wanted the band to provide a new video for the track. Napolitano revealed to The Ottawa Citizen, "They want us to remake it. MTV won't take the video off, but they won't play it any more either. It's a very strong thing."

== Critical reception ==
On its release, FMQB wrote, "Napolitano sneers and pants the words and by the instrumental break, the band sinks into a wonderful groove and some twisted guitar." Chris Willman of the Los Angeles Times described "God Is a Bullet" as a "hard rocking, pleading lament" with a "'Peter Gunn'-like bass theme [and] a sirenlike guitar riff". Jim Sullivan of The Boston Globe considered it to be "a fierce, catchy, anti-gun madness song written well before the current sniper madness began [but] coincidentally topical."

In a review of Free, David Okamoto of the St. Petersburg Times wrote, "The standout is 'God Is a Bullet,' a passionate statement that employs chugging 'Peter Gunn' guitars to drive Napolitano's chilling vignettes and remorse for such slain heroes as John Lennon, Martin Luther King Jr. and Harvey Milk." Gene Armstrong of The Arizona Daily Star considered the song to be "sinister" and one which "rides a creepy guitar-bass line that recalls the themes from 'Batman' and 'Peter Gunn'." John Kendle of The Winnipeg Sun stated the song is an "anti-gun reworking of the riff from the Batman theme, marked by Napolitano's throaty, she-cat-on-the-prowl vocals".

== Formats ==
7-inch single (UK, Europe and Australia)
No.	Title	Length
1.	"God Is a Bullet"	4:20
2.	"Free"	3:10

12-inch single (US, UK and Europe) and CD single (Germany)
No.	Title	Length
1.	"God Is a Bullet"	4:20
2.	"Free"	3:10
3.	"Little Wing"	4:15

CD single (US promo)
No.	Title	Length
1.	"God Is a Bullet"	4:22

== Personnel ==
Credits are adapted from the German CD single liner notes and the Free CD album booklet.

God Is a Bullet

- Johnette Napolitano – vocals
- Jim Mankey – guitars
- Allan Bloch – bass
- Harry Rushakoff – drums

Production

- Concrete Blonde – producers ("God Is a Bullet", "Free", "Little Wing")
- Earle Mankey – recording ("God Is a Bullet", "Free", "Little Wing"), producer ("Free"), mixing ("Free", "Little Wing")
- Chris Tsangarides – mixing ("God Is a Bullet")

Other

- Johnette Napolitano – sleeve
- Jane Simpson – video stills
- William Herrón of Los Illegals – original art

== Charts ==
Chart (1989)	Peak position
Australia (ARIA Charts)	146
US Alternative Airplay (Billboard)	15
US Mainstream Rock (Billboard)	49
