= Joey (Concrete Blonde song) =

1990 single by Concrete Blonde

Single by Concrete Blonde

from the album Bloodletting
- B-side: "I Want You"
- Released: May 21, 1990
- Recorded: 1989
- Genre: Alternative pop; arena rock; soft rock
- Length: 4:07
- Label: I.R.S.
- Songwriter: Johnette Napolitano
- Producers: Chris Tsangarides; Concrete Blonde

Concrete Blonde singles chronology
"Bloodletting (The Vampire Song)" (1990)	"Joey" (1990)	"Everybody Knows" (1990)

"Joey" is the ninth track from American rock band Concrete Blonde's third studio album, Bloodletting (1990). The song was released in 1990 and was written and sung by the band's frontwoman, Johnette Napolitano. The song was written in a cab on the way to a photo studio in Philadelphia; it was the last vocal recorded on the album due to Napolitano's reluctance to record the lyrics, which were hard for her to deal with.

The song became the group's biggest hit, spending four weeks atop the US Billboard Modern Rock Tracks chart and crossing over to pop radio, reaching number 19 on the Billboard Hot 100; it remains their only charting song on the latter listing. Worldwide, "Joey" reached number two in Australia, ending 1990 as the country's 16th-best-selling single, and peaked at number four on Canada's RPM 100 Hit Tracks chart, ranking in at number 53 on the magazine's year-end listing for 1990.

== Lyrics ==
The song is sung from the perspective of a woman who is in love with an alcoholic. Napolitano mentioned in her book Rough Mix that the song was written about her relationship with Marc Moreland of the band Wall of Voodoo.

In a 2014 interview with SongFacts' Dan MacIntosh, Napolitano described the process for writing "Joey" as starting with a wordless melody, to which lyrics were eventually added. According to Napolitano, she avoided writing the lyrics to "Joey" until the last possible moment due to the difficult nature of the subject matter. In her words:

"I knew what I wanted to say, but I wasn't looking forward to saying it. So it was the last vocal that I recorded. And I remember Chris every day, "Do we have vocals to 'Joey' yet? Do we have words to 'Joey' yet?" And I'm like, "Not yet." So I literally wrote them in a cab. I knew what I was going to say, it's just a matter of like a cloud's forming and then it rains. The lines are forming in my head and they're all in my head, and I know the chorus, and I know what I'm going to say. It's just a matter of fine-tuning the details and how I'm going to lug it out. And then it rains. The clouds all formed and it rained. And then it happened. And that was it. And it was just there."

== Music video ==
The music video for "Joey" was directed by Jane Simpson. The Recording Academy has described the video as "[illustrating] this love triangle in the truest sense, spotlighting frontwoman Johnette Napolitano performing for an audience of one in a dark, dungeonesque bar. The lone member of the crowd could only be Napolitano's lovesick lover... who's only sick for the bottle of alcohol from which he can't avert his eyes." The video for "Joey" achieved Buzz Bin status on MTV in 1990. A digitally remastered version of the video was uploaded to YouTube on March 12, 2009.

== Track listings ==
7-inch and cassette single

1. "Joey" – 4:07
2. "I Want You" – 3:28

UK 12-inch and CD single

1. "Joey" – 4:07
2. "I Want You" – 3:28
3. "I Don't Need a Hero" – 4:25

European 12-inch and maxi-CD single

1. "Joey" – 4:07
2. "I Want You" – 3:28
3. "The Beast" – 3:52

== Charts ==
=== Weekly charts ===
Chart (1990)	Peak position
Australia (ARIA)	2
Belgium (Ultratop 50 Flanders)	35
Canada Top Singles (RPM)	4
Netherlands (Dutch Top 40)	14
Netherlands (Single Top 100)	17
US Billboard Hot 100	19
US Adult Contemporary (Billboard)	42
US Album Rock Tracks (Billboard)	20
US Modern Rock Tracks (Billboard)	1
US Cash Box Top 100 Singles	20

=== Year-end charts ===
Chart (1990)	Position
Australia (ARIA)	16
Canada Top Singles (RPM)	53
US Modern Rock Tracks (Billboard)	11

== Certifications ==
Region	Certification	Certified units/sales
Australia (ARIA)	Platinum	70,000^{^}
New Zealand (RMNZ)	Gold	15,000^{‡}
^{^} Shipments figures based on certification alone.^{‡} Sales+streaming figures based on certification alone.

== Release history ==
Region	Date	Format(s)	Label(s)	Ref.
United States	1990	Cassette	I.R.S.	
Australia	May 21, 1990	7-inch vinyl; cassette	I.R.S.	
United Kingdom	October 15, 1990	7-inch vinyl; 12-inch vinyl; CD	I.R.S.	

== See also ==
- List of Billboard Modern Rock Tracks number ones of the 1990s
