= Earle Mankey =

- Born: March 8, 1947 (age 79); Washington, United States
- Genre: Rock
- Occupations: Musician; record producer; audio engineer
- Instrument: Guitar
- Formerly of: Sparks

Earle Mankey (sometimes misspelled "Earl" in credits) (born March 8, 1947, in Washington, United States) is an American musician, record producer and audio engineer. He was a founding member and guitarist for the band Halfnelson, later called Sparks. He became a record producer, predominantly for Los Angeles area bands like the Pop, 20/20, the Runaways, Concrete Blonde, Jumpin' Jimes, the Long Ryders, the Three O'Clock, the Tearaways, the Conditionz, Adicts, Durango 95, Leslie Pereira and the Lazy Heroes, and Kristian Hoffman. He is the brother of Concrete Blonde guitarist James Mankey.

As an engineer, his work includes The Beach Boys Love You (1977) and M.I.U. Album (1978) by The Beach Boys.

Mankey's route into studio work began formally with the demo recordings he engineered for Halfnelson. Using two stereo reel-to-reel tape recorders (a Sony quarter-inch and a Panasonic quarter-inch) he painstakingly built up the tracks by recording onto the first recorder and then playing the results back into the second recorder along with a simultaneous performance either by himself on guitar or Ron Mael on keyboards until a finished backing track was completed, to which Russell Mael then added vocals. Mankey describes these early experiments as "fussing around with tape recorders" though he admits he took pride in the "cutting edge" nature of the home recordings he made at this time.

On his approach to recording and making music, he says: "About the only thing that can excite me is to try to think of something I haven't thought of before and then try to do it – which is the satisfying part."

== Personal life ==
Earle lives in and maintains his studio in Thousand Oaks, California, called "Earle's Psychedelic Shack" and is still active in recording and producing.

Earle is the elder brother of Concrete Blonde guitarist James Mankey.

== Discography ==
=== As guitarist ===
- Sparks – Sparks/Halfnelson (1971)
- Sparks – A Woofer in Tweeter's Clothing (1972)

=== As solo artist ===
Mankey launched his solo career with a 1978 single "Mau Mau" featuring b-side "Crazy".

In 1981, Mankey performed, produced and engineered some of his own music on a six-song mini-Lp self-titled: "Earle Mankey".

In 1984, Mankey issued another six-song mini-Lp: "Real World".

Both "Earle Mankey" and "Real World" were reissued together on Mankey's 1998 compilation album also titled "Earle Mankey".

=== As producer ===
- The Quick – Mondo Deco (1976)
- The Runaways – Queens of Noise (1976)
- Helen Reddy – "Ear Candy" (also, guitar, songwriting and engineering - 1977)
- Paley Brothers – Paley Brothers (1978)
- The Pop – Go! (1979)
- 20/20 – 20/20 (1979)
- The Dickies – Incredible Shrinking Dickies (1979)
- The Runaways – Flaming Schoolgirls (1980)
- Walter Egan – Last Stroll (1980)
- Trees – Sleep Convention (1981)
- The Three O'Clock – Baroque Hoedown EP (Frontier Records, 1982)
- The Three O'Clock – Sixteen Tambourines (Frontier Records, 1983)
- The Long Ryders – 10-5-60 (1983)
- The Conditionz – Weird America (Primal Lunch, (1985)
- Concrete Blonde – Concrete Blonde (IRS, 1986)
- Durango 95 – Dreams & Trains (1986)
- The Droogs – Kingdom Day (1987)
- The Conditionz – Cream Soda Throw Rug (Primal Lunch, (1987)
- The Conditionz – Head (Primal Lunch, (1988)
- The Leaving Trains – Transportational D. Vices (1989)
- Different World – Different World (1990)
- CLYDE – Ancient of Days (1990-1991)
- The Leaving Trains – Sleeping Underwater Survivors (1991)
- Geko – Join My Pretty World (1992)
- Permanent Green Light – Against Nature (1993)
- Sparks – In the Swing (1993)
- Possum Dixon – Possum Dixon (1993)
- The Mumps – Fatal Charm (1994)
- Purple Bosco – Deeper (1995)
- The Leaving Trains – Drowned & Dragged (1995)
- Sacrilicious – When You Wish Upon a Dead Star (1995)
- Lazy Cowgirls – Ragged Soul (1995)
- Cockeyed Ghost – Keep Yourself Amused (1996)
- The Last – Gin & Innuendoes (1996)
- Lucky – Live a Little (1996)
- Tearaways – Ground's the Limit (1997)
- Lazy Cowgirls – Little Sex & Death (1997)
- Cockeyed Ghost – Neverest (1997)
- Lazy Cowgirls – Broken Hearted on Valentine's Day (1998)
- Lazy Cowgirls – Rank Outsider (1999)
- Tearaways – In Your Ear (1999)
- Trailer Park Casanovas – End of an Era (1999)
- Formula – Formula (2000)
- The Lazy Cowgirls – Somewhere Down the Line (2000)
- Geoff Gardner – You Can't Come Home (2000)
- Jupiter Affect – Instructions for the Two Ways of Becoming Alice (2000)
- Lazy Cowgirls – Here and Now: (Live!) (2001)
- Eclipso – Hero and Villain in One Man! (2001)
- Chainsaw – We Are Not Very Nice (2002)
- Kristian Hoffman – & (Eggbert Records, 2002)
- Skulls – Therapy for the Shy (2002)
- Stitches – 12 Imaginary Inches (2002)
- Skulls – Golden Age of Piracy (2003)
- Lazy Cowgirls – I'm Goin' Out and Get Hurt Tonight (2004)
- The Eddies – Into the Sunshine (2004)
- Mumps – How I Saved the World (2005)
- Sparks – Big Beat [Bonus Tracks] (2006)
- ADZ – Live Plus Five (2006)
- The Eddies – Twice Around The World (2008)
- Elton Duck – Elton Duck (recorded 1980, released 2012)
- The Tearaways "We're All Gonna Drink Tonight" b/w "Baby Blue" (recorded fall 2013, released November 2013) Robo Records, a Division of Universal music (2013) - co-produced by (John Ferriter, John Finseth)
- Kylie Hughes "Calipopicana" EP - recorded 2014 released October 2014 Shrimptoast Records (co-produced by Kylie Hughes, John Finseth, John Ferriter)
- The Tearaways "The Earle Mankey Sessions: Vol. IV" recorded 2014 released November 2014. Robo Records, a Division of Universal Music 2014 (co-produced by John Ferriter, John Finseth)
- The Tearaways "The Earle Mankey Sessions: Vol. VII" recorded 2014 released November 2014. Robo Records, a Division of Universal Music 2014. (co-produced by John Ferriter, John Finseth)

=== As engineer ===
- Chuck Crane – Crane (1978)
- Elton John – Blue Moves (1976)
- Lisa Hartman – Lisa Hartman (1976)
- The Beach Boys – The Beach Boys Love You (1977)
- The Beach Boys – M.I.U. Album (1978)
- Danko Grebb and Friends (Album) (1980)
- Downy Mildew – Broomtree (1987)
- Downy Mildew – Mincing Steps (1988)
- Non Credo – Reluctant Hosts (1988)
- Concrete Blonde – Bloodletting (1990)
- CLYDE – Ancient of Days (1990-1991)
- The Weirdos – Weird World, Vol. 1 (1991)
- Mr. Jones and The Previous – Porch Music (1991)
- The Nymphs – Practical Guide to Astral Projection (1992)
- Dakoda Motor Co. – Into the Son (1993)
- Concrete Blonde – Mexican Moon (1993)
- The Cramps – Flamejob (1994)
- El Vez – Fun in Espanol (1994)
- Mark Nine – This Island Earth (1994)
- El Vez – Graciasland (1994)
- Pretty & Twisted – Pretty & Twisted (1995)
- David Gray – Sell, Sell, Sell (1996)
- El Vez – Never Been to Spain (Until Now) (1996)
- The Cramps – Big Beat from Badsville (1997)
- Department of Crooks – Plan 9 from Las Vegas (1997)
- Jumpin Jimes – They Rock They Roll They Swing (1998)
- Cockeyed Ghost – Scapegoat Factory (1999)
- Marty Grebb – Smooth Sailin' (1999)
- The Solipsistics – Jesus of the Apes (2000)
- Maria Fatal – Dermis (2001)
- Vivabeat – Good Life (2001)
- The Adicts – Rise and Shine (2002)
- Trailer Park Casanovas – So Charming (2002)
- Concrete Blonde – Group Therapy (2002)
- The Adicts – Rollercoaster (2004)
- Peach – Real Thing (2004)
- The Adicts – Life Goes On (2009)
- Ann Magnuson – Pretty Songs & Ugly Stories (2006)
- Medicine Hat – “Whiskey And Waves” (2015)
- Medicine Hat – “Fences” (2020)
