= Harry Rushakoff =

American drummer

- Born: November 16, 1958 (age 67)
- Origin: Chicago, Illinois, United States
- Genre: Rock
- Occupation: Drummer

Harry Rushakoff (born November 16, 1958) is a former drummer for the band Concrete Blonde.

He started his career in Chicago, playing with The Nodes and then with Special Affect (which featured Ministry's Al Jourgensen and My Life with the Thrill Kill Kult's Groovie Mann.

Rushakoff also played in Chicago area band 4xy with bassist Chris Kirkendal, guitarist Eddie Yeo, and singer Aidan Mann. He worked with Jim Belushi when the actor used 4xy to record some demos and play live dates. Rushakoff also played with famed Chicago guitarist Harvey Mandel (known for his work with the Rolling Stones and Canned Heat). In addition, he recorded with longtime friend Tom Peterson, Cheap Trick’s bassist. After moving to Los Angeles, he began working with Fleetwood Mac's Lindsey Buckingham, who at the time was guesting on a recording for Geffen label artist A Drop In The Gray, a band that Rushakoff joined briefly. After relocating to Nashville, he joined the Steve Earle-produced band Guilt, an MCA Records artist.
