= Johnette Napolitano =

American musician

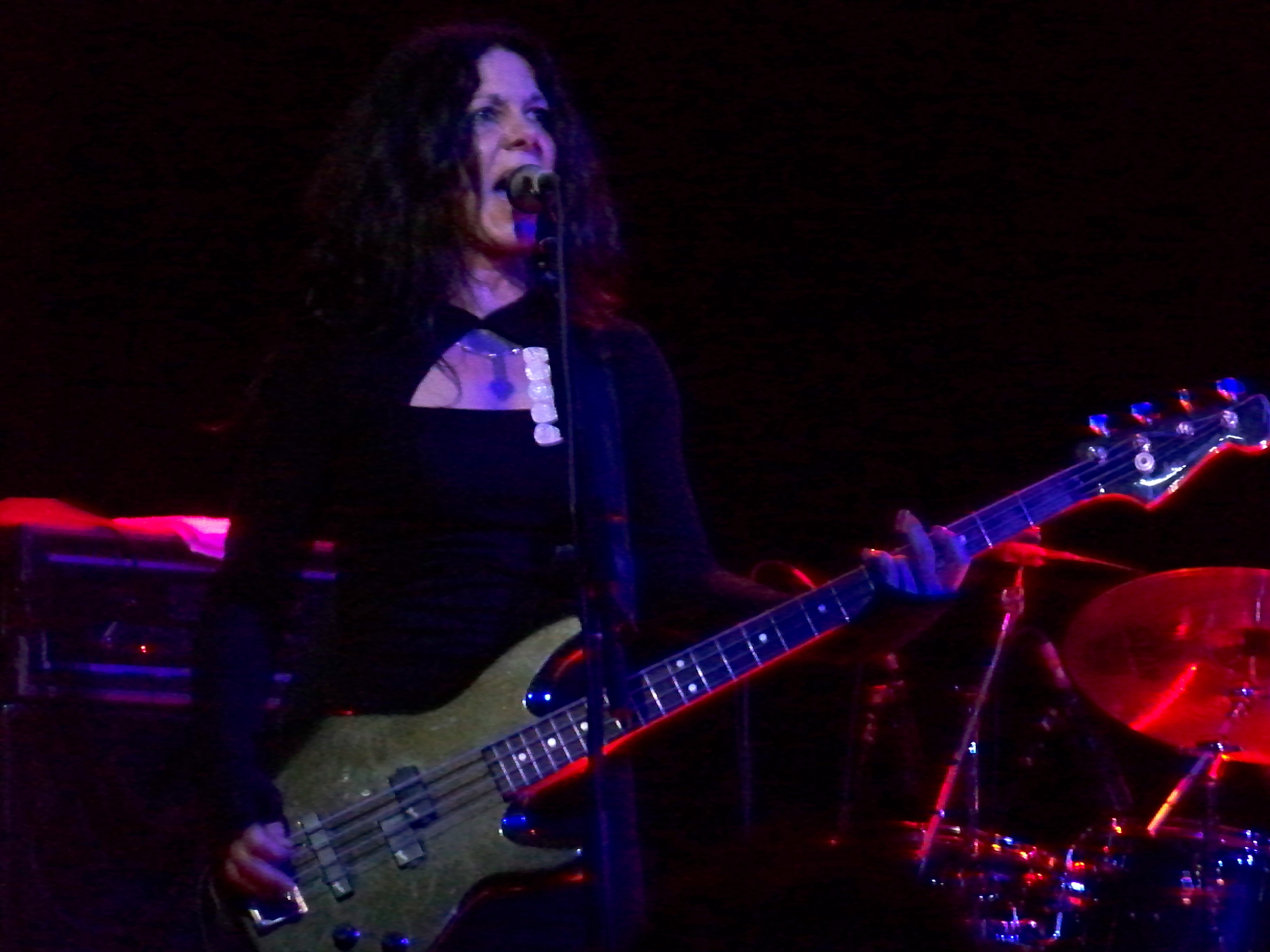
- Napolitano performing in 2010

Background information
- Born: Johnette L. Napolitano; September 22, 1957 (age 69); Los Angeles, California, U.S.
- Genre: Alternative rock
- Occupations: Musician, songwriter
- Instruments: Bass guitar, vocals
- Years active: 1982–present
- Labels: Hybrid Recordings, Warner Bros.
- Formerly of: Dream 6; Concrete Blonde; Pretty & Twisted

Johnette Napolitano (born Jonette L. Napolitano; September 22, 1957) is an American musician best known as the lead vocalist, songwriter, and bassist for the rock band Concrete Blonde.

== Early life ==
Johnette Napolitano was born and raised in Los Angeles, the eldest of five children in an Italian American family.

Her parents recognized their daughter possessed musical talent when, as a child, she was able to play "Somewhere Over the Rainbow" on piano by ear. Her mother loved show tunes. The family also listened to Johnny Cash, Marty Robbins, and the Rat Pack. At age five she enrolled in a gifted kids art program at UCLA.

== Concrete Blonde ==
In 1986, Napolitano co-founded Concrete Blonde with guitarist James Mankey. She sang and sometimes played bass guitar. The pair had worked together under a variety of names since 1982. They released seven studio albums between 1986 and 2004, and one additional album as a collaboration with Los Illegals. Concrete Blonde had several moderately successful singles, including "God is a Bullet", "Joey", "Tomorrow Wendy", and a cover version of "Everybody Knows", originally by Leonard Cohen.

Concrete Blonde broke up and re-formed several times, with Napolitano and Mankey as the only constant members. The band has not been active since 2012.

== Solo career ==
She has recorded as a solo artist, with the albums Sketchbook (2002), Sketchbook 2 (2006), Scarred (2007), and Sketchbook 3 (2010). Napolitano also recorded a solo album titled Sound of a Woman around 1996–1997, and performed many of the songs on a solo tour opening for Paul Weller. The album was set to be released on IRS (a subdivision of Island Records), the label of her old band, Concrete Blonde. 1997–1998 was a bad time for Island, starting with the sudden departure of founder-CEO Chris Blackwell and ending with the total reorganization of the label. Sound of a Woman was, effectively, lost in the shuffle, and at this point is unlikely to ever be officially released. Bootleg copies of this album are rare and highly valued.

Before Concrete Blonde, Napolitano was a member of Dream 6, who released their self-titled debut EP in 1983.

In addition to Concrete Blonde, Napolitano was involved with several musical projects, including Vowel Movement, a semi-improvisational musical collaboration with Holly Beth Vincent; and Pretty & Twisted, a band that also featured former Wall of Voodoo guitarist Marc Moreland.

She is one of several vocalists featured on the 1996 album No Talking, Just Head, by The Heads, including the single "Damage I've Done". The group was formed by three members of Talking Heads (Jerry Harrison, Chris Frantz and Tina Weymouth). Napolitano was the primary vocalist for The Heads' only concert tour. The Heads was intended to become a full-time band, with further studio albums and tours. A live CD-video of the first tour was planned, featuring performances from many of the album's guest artists and Napolitano on vocals for the songs originally recorded by Talking Heads. David Byrne sued the band, saying their name and presentation was too evocative of Talking Heads. The suit was settled out of court, and The Heads ceased activity.

As of 2009, Napolitano lived in Joshua Tree, California. She composes music for films and works as a gallery artist, specializing in working with discarded and reclaimed materials. She also cares for rescue horses.

=== Non-Concrete Blonde discography ===
- Johnette Napolitano and Holly Vincent Vowel Movement (1995, Mammoth Records)
- Pretty & Twisted (1995, Warner Bros. Records)
- Sketchbook (2002, independently released)
- Johnette Napolitano and Buzz Gamble "Cheap Tequila" single (2004, independently released)
- Sketchbook 2 (2005, independently released)
- Scarred (2007, Hybrid Recordings)
- Sketchbook 3 (2009, Happy Hermit/independently released)
- Naked (2015, EP, independently released)
- The Naked Album (2015, independently released)
- Exquisite Corpses (2022, Schoolkids Records)

=== Other projects ===
She has contributed music to many films, including the 1996 film Barb Wire, the 2006 Australian film Candy, and "Suicide Note" from Underworld.

The following films and TV programs also feature songs performed by Concrete Blonde:

- The Texas Chainsaw Massacre 2 (1986)
- The Hidden (1987)
- Pump Up the Volume (1990; cover version of Leonard Cohen's "Everybody Knows')
- Beverly Hills, 90210 (1990; TV) – "One Man and a Baby" episode
- Point Break (1991)
- Me Myself & I (1992)
- Beavis and Butt-Head (1993; TV) – "Blood Drive" episode
- Jimmy Hollywood (1994)
- Girls in Prison (1994; TV, part of the Rebel Highway series of films. The track was entitled "Endless Sleep", and included on the soundtrack album).
- Losing Isaiah (1995)
- Deadly Love (1995; TV)
- Passions (1999)
- The Sopranos (1999; TV) – "Calling All Cars" episode
- The Great (2020) – "A Simple Jape" episode

Soundtrack:

- Dead Silence (2007; "Who's Holding You Now?"). This track was not included on the soundtrack album.
- Candy (2006; "Wedding Theme From Candy")
- The Third Watch (2004; season 5, episode 17)
- The Sopranos – "Nobody Knows Anything" (1999; "Highs Are Too High")
- Foxfire (1996; "Dancing Barefoot"). This track was not included on the soundtrack album.
- Barb Wire (1996; "She's So Free")
- The Basketball Diaries (1995; "Dancing Barefoot"). This track was not included on the soundtrack album.
- Echo Park (1986; "Tomorrow's Gonna Be")
- Point Break (1991; "I Want You")

Composer:

- West (2007)
- Pep Squad (1998)

Actress:

- Cry Radio (1998) – Narrator

In 1996, Napolitano produced an album by Australian group In Vivo.

Napolitano collaborated with Danny Lohner (Nine Inch Nails, A Perfect Circle, Black Light Burns) on the horror film Dead Silence. The pair had successfully collaborated previously for the films Underworld and Wicker Park.

Napolitano contributed vocals to an album by John Trudell, and performs backing vocals in "Struck a Nerve" by Bad Religion on the Recipe For Hate album.

Napolitano performed the main vocals on the score of the Australian film West, written and directed by Daniel Krige. She also sang the title song, "Falling in Love".

Napolitano performed the duet "My Little Problem" with Paul Westerberg on The Replacements' All Shook Down release.

Napolitano provided vocals on the track "I Am Where it Takes Me" by metal band Black Light Burns.

Napolitano is credited as co-writer of the Ashes Divide song "Too Late".

Napolitano wrote and sang, with Steve Wynn, the song "Conspiracy of the Heart" included on Steve Wynn's album Kerosene Man (1990).

=== Pretty & Twisted ===
Johnette Napolitano joined Marc Moreland and Danny Montgomery to form Pretty & Twisted in 1995. Their self-titled debut, Pretty & Twisted, was produced by Napolitano and released on Warner Brother Records, Inc.

The track listing for the album was:

1. "The Highs Are Too High" – 6:10
2. "Mother of Pearl" – 5:05 (Bryan Ferry)
3. "Souvenir" – 5:09
4. "No Daddy No" – 4:34
5. "iRide!" – 3:40
6. "Train Song (Edge of Desperation)" – 6:30
7. "Stranger" – 2:59 (Paul Westerberg, Johnette Napolitano)
8. "Singing is Fire" – 3:11 (Lyrics by Charles Bukowski)
9. "Don't Take Me Down" – 4:37
10. "Come Away With Me" – 5:55 (words: Janis Joplin, music: Johnette Napolitano)
11. "Dear Marlon Brando" – 3:30
12. "Billy" – 3:39
13. "Watching the Water" – 4:17

=== Scarred ===
Napolitano's solo album Scarred was released on May 28, 2007, on the label Hybrid Recordings.

Scarred track list

1. "Amazing" – 4:08
2. "The Scientist" (Coldplay cover, with Danny Lohner) – 5:07
3. "Scarred" – 4:09
4. "Poem for the Native" – 5:19
5. "My Diane" – 5:01
6. "Just Like Time" – 4:41
7. "Save Me" – 3:19
8. "Like a Wave" – 4:41
9. "Crazy Tonight" – 5:26
10. "Everything for Everyone" – 4:56
11. "All Tomorrow's Parties" (The Velvet Underground cover) – 3:40
12. "I'm Up Here" – 4:27

== Personal life ==
Though raised irreligious, Napolitano converted to Roman Catholicism as an adult, stating, "I’ve studied Eastern religions a lot, but the Catholic faith is what fits me best." Other lifestyle changes post-Concrete Blonde included quitting hard alcohol and marijuana.

In 1987, after a show at Texas Records in Santa Monica, California, Napolitano was pulled over during a traffic stop. Having no proof of insurance or a driver's license, she was arrested and her car, an Oldsmobile Cutlass, was towed. Deirdre O'Donoghue, then a DJ on KCRW, saw the incident and said she would bail Napolitano out. She went home, retrieved $200 from a jar she had, and posted the bail. The two became friends.

== See also ==
- If I Were a Carpenter
