= James Mankey =

American rock guitarist (born 1952)

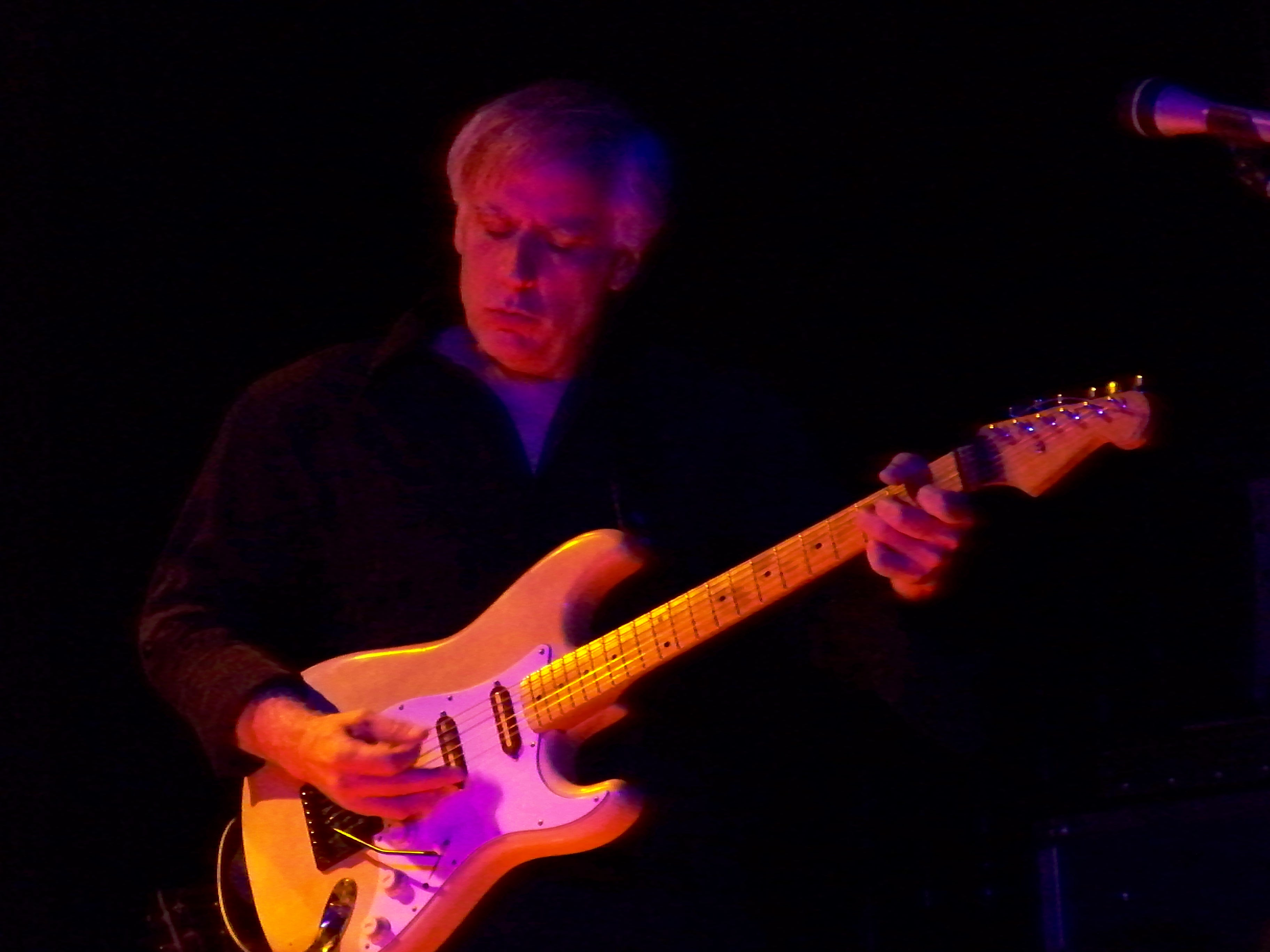
- Mankey in 2010

Background information
- Born: May 23, 1952 (age 73); Washington, United States
- Genres: Rock
- Occupation: Musician
- Instruments: Guitar; bass
- Formerly of: Concrete Blonde; Sparks

James Andrew Mankey (born May 23, 1952 in Washington) is an American rock guitarist, most widely known as the co-founder and longtime guitarist of the band Concrete Blonde. Mankey was also the bassist with the band Sparks for their first two albums.

He is the brother of musician and record producer Earle Mankey.

In 2003, Mankey released J.A.M., a solo instrumental album.
