= Alfredo de Batuc =

American painter

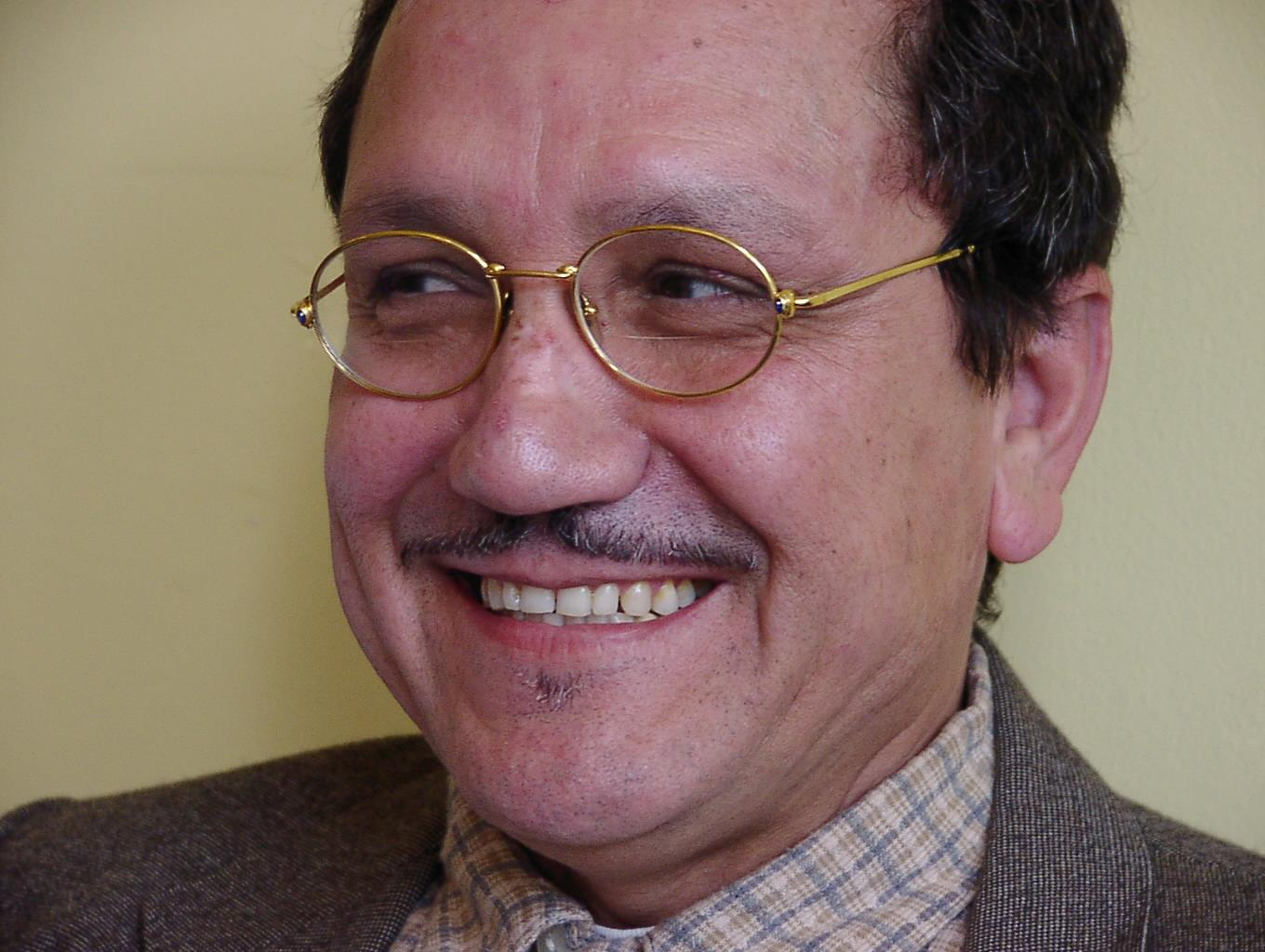
Mexican American artist Alfredo de Batuc

Alfredo de Batuc is a Mexican American artist who was born in Mexico in 1950 but has been living and working in Los Angeles, California since 1975. De Batuc has worked in a variety of mediums including drawing, painting, ceramics, silkscreen and lithograph prints, and has also been commissioned for several special projects such as murals in the Los Angeles area. His work with Self Help Graphics during its early years and during the height of the Chicano Movement connects de Batuc to a rich history of political and artistic activism. Through this work and activism, de Batuc helped to create a collective Mexican American cultural pride and identity that was integral to the goals of the Chicano Movement. In 2005, Alfredo de Batuc was stricken with a severe case of Guillain–Barré syndrome, which has kept him from active life since, and from which he is slowly recovering.

== Biography ==
Alfredo de Batuc was born in 1950 in the small village of Batuc, located in the northwestern state of Sonora, Mexico. He lived in this village for the first thirteen years of his life until he decided to leave home to join a Roman Catholic boarding school. De Batuc left the boarding school after three years to join his family, who had recently relocated to Hermosillo, the state capital of Sonora. While in Hermosillo, de Batuc attended the Academia de Artes Plasticas and became involved in various arts organizations and exhibits and began to produce art more seriously.

De Batuc’s family, along with the 3,000 other inhabitants of Batuc were forced to leave the village and relocate due to the construction of the Plutarco Elias Calles, or El Novillo Dam. The controversial construction of the dam was implemented by the Mexican government from 1958 to 1964 and was part of a national effort to transition to an industrialized economy from the agricultural economy involving mining and cattle raising that had previously dominated the area. The dam was meant to provide water for irrigation and generate electricity but resulted in the complete flooding and subsequent destruction of the village of Batuc along with two other neighboring towns. In an interview conducted in 2012, de Batuc discussed how this event had affected him as a child, stating that he knew he would be forced to leave but remained in his home as long as possible before it was destroyed. His family was one of the last to leave Batuc, and he remembers watching from a distance as the water slowly rose to submerge his childhood home. This forced relocation and the flooding of his village have deeply influenced de Batuc and his art, and he still refers to this event as the “death by drowning of [his] home town” and is reminded “that in the house of [his] childhood, fish swim.”

De Batuc left Hermosillo when he was twenty-five in order to settle in Los Angeles, California and pursue his artistic career. While studying and creating individual pieces, he became interested in the idea of producing multiples or works in series and became involved with the serigraphy program at Self Help Graphics in Los Angeles almost immediately after settling there. De Batuc quickly became close to fellow artist Carlos Bueno, who was integral to the foundation of Self Help Graphics as well as their efforts to bring the traditional Mexican holiday of Dia de los Muertos to California. De Batuc subsequently became more involved with these efforts to introduce the festival to the local area and therefore foster a sense of cultural pride and identity among the Mexican American community of California.

During these early years in Los Angeles, de Batuc held a variety of jobs including preschool teacher, children's book illustrator, and story-board artist for the film industry. De Batuc continued to sell his work but only began exhibiting professionally in 1984. Since then, de Batuc has focused solely on his artistic career and has exhibited locally as well as internationally in cities such as Kyoto, Japan, Mexico City, Mexico, and Tijuana, Mexico. Over the course of his career, de Batuc has produced works on paper, paintings, ceramics, silkscreen and lithograph prints as well as special commissions for murals and other commemorative pieces. Some of his works are now held in the permanent collections of the Laguna Art Museum, the Los Angeles County Museum, and the Museo Estudio Diego Rivera in Mexico City.

In 2005, de Batuc was developed a severe case of Guillain–Barré syndrome, a rare autoimmune disorder that affects the nervous system and can cause nerve damage and paralysis. Unfortunately for de Batuc, the disease mostly affected his upper extremities, resulting in the paralysis of his hands and the inability to continue his artistic career. Since the onset of the disease, de Batuc has been involved in extensive physical therapy in order to recover his mobility and independence. While de Batuc still suffers some residual effects such as extreme fatigue, he has begun to produce art again, albeit only small drawings and paintings.

== Artistic practice ==
De Batuc is chiefly concerned with the formal elements of art and design, including composition, color, visual harmony, and three-dimensionality. His works have a strong sense of composition, and his application of paint results in a consistently rich and complex surface.

A number of symbols and icons constantly recur throughout the body of de Batuc’s work, including references to the primordial elements of earth, water, fire, and air as well as references to ancient Mexican civilizations. De Batuc specifically references the Olmec head stone carvings found in the Gulf of Mexico and reinterprets these monumental figures into an all-seeing being he calls the "Presence.” In his earlier works, de Batuc painted this figure as completely ambiguous. While viewers have identified it as the sun or the moon or as male or female, de Batuc has assigned no meaning to the Presence. De Batuc depicts the Presence not as threatening or as a symbol of either good or bad, but as a completely neutral icon. However, in more recent years, de Batuc has begun to paint this figure with more feminine qualities and characteristics. De Batuc has depicted the Presence throughout his body of work, but it can be seen specifically in his paintings entitled Presence with Volcano and Dog and Three Men in a Boat (Presence).

The Los Angeles City Hall is another notable and recurring symbol in de Batuc’s work. After settling in Los Angeles, de Batuc developed a desire to anchor his works in the area. He decided to use the Los Angeles City Hall as this marker and identifier as opposed to other landmarks of Los Angeles such as the Hollywood sign. According to de Batuc, unlike these other popular icons of Los Angeles, the city hall represents the people of Los Angeles, both legally and politically. De Batuc also cites the rivalry of Los Angeles and New York as artistic capitals of the United States as a reason for the repetition of this symbol. De Batuc aims to establish Los Angeles as an artistic center rather than solely as a center for the television and film industry with which it is typically associated. In placing his artworks firmly within the city of Los Angeles, he hopes to bring about the recognition and appreciation of Los Angeles as an important artistic center of the United States. De Batuc 's representations of the Los Angeles City Hall can be seen in many of his works including Seven Views of City Hall, Our Lord City Hall, and Sub Rosa.

=== Work with Self Help Graphics ===
De Batuc’s involvement at Self Help Graphics in the years immediately following his move to Los Angeles along with his working relationship with Carlos Bueno led de Batuc to become involved in the efforts by Self Help Graphics to bring the Dia de los Muertos festival to California. The festival and the efforts to popularize it in California were central to the Chicano Movement of the 1970s and its goals in creating a collective Mexican American culture, pride, and identity as well as promoting and achieving Mexican American civil rights. De Batuc's involvement with the arts organization during the 1970s and 1980s, during the height of the Chicano Movement, connects de Batuc to the political and social mobilization of the movement as well as the increased awareness and appreciation of Chicano art and artists.

Since the efforts to promote the festival began in the late 1970s and early 1980s, Self Help Graphics has commissioned local artists each year to create commemorative serigraph prints to memorialize each years' celebration. The prints have been used as marketing materials or simply as a means for local artists to reinterpret the festival in relation to their own experience as Mexican Americans. These commemorative prints created for the festival have achieved national recognition and have led to a new appreciation for Chicano art and artists. Therefore, they also serve as important works of the Chicano art legacy as well as the Chicano Movement in general. De Batuc created these commemorative prints for the Dia de los Muertos celebrations of 1979 and 1981, entitled Four Seasons and Las Cuatas, respectively.

==== Las Cuatas ====
Las Cuatas is a reinterpretation of a painting by Mexican artist Frida Kahlo entitled, Los Dos Fridas. As in Los Dos Fridas, Las Cuatas depicts two seated representations of Frida Kahlo as the figures hold hands and are connected by their exposed anatomical hearts. In de Batuc’s print, the Frida on the left is portrayed as a calavera, a representation of a human skeleton that is an important symbol connected to the Dia de Los Muertos festival. The two Fridas face each other as they hold a mask of one another's face. Cherubs frame the print as they hold a banner heralding the words, “Dia de los Muertos, 1981” above the seated figures. The Hollywood sign, Los Angeles City Hall, and Watts Towers are visible through the windows in the background of the print, establishing the setting of the scene as within the city of Los Angeles.

=== Other notable works ===
In addition to the extensive amount of works on paper de Batuc has created, he has also taken part in several special commissions such as murals. One of his most well-known and most reproduced works is his street mural depicting the late Mexican actress, Dolores del Rio, who was one of Hollywood's first Latina actresses. De Batuc was chosen for this mural commission after the Social and Public Art Resource Center (S.P.A.R.C.) of Los Angeles sent out a competitive call for submissions and ultimately accepted de Batuc's proposal above all others. According to de Batuc, he wanted to create a sense of neighborhood pride through the mural and chose Dolores del Rio as his subject due to her extensive work and successful career in the Hollywood film industry in the 1920s and 1930s. The mural was first painted in 1990 but has subsequently been severely vandalized and restored several times in recent years. It is located at the corner of Hollywood Boulevard and Hudson Street in Los Angeles.
