= SHGA =

SHGA may stand for:

- Self Help Graphics & Art – a community arts center in East Los Angeles, California
- Short-handed goals allowed – a statistic in ice hockey
