= Kiosko =

Unsold television pilot

- Genre: Educational, children's program
- Created by: Miguel-Angel Soria; Alejandra M. Gomez
- Country of origin: United States
- Original language: English

Original release
- Release: 2007

Kiosko was an unsold television pilot for a multicultural music education television series for children produced by KPBS television in San Diego, California. It was nominated in 2008 for an Emmy award under the Children's Program or Special Category, Pacific Southwest Chapter of the National Television Academy.

The show's focus was on music education, using various forms of music from around the globe. It featured a combination of live action, puppetry, and animation, similar to Sesame Street.

The pilot for the show was aired in August 2007, but the show was never picked up.

== Plot ==
Doctor Luna has lost his melody and almost everyone in Kiosko is trying to help him find it. However, Mr. GrunkCrankChoomBuzzAu wants to stop him and everyone else from finding it and anyone else's melody.

== Cast ==
- Crystal Brooke Alforque as Angie
- Genaro Bermúdez as Doctor Luna
- Carmen Boatwright as Miss Notes
- Veronica Burgess as Punkiya
- Rudolfo Covarrubias as Rastachon
- Sara Duran as Aki
- Sylvia Enrique as Katrina The Composer
- Olivia Espinosa as Judge Inez
- Tim Foley as Piper Sean
- Steve Hohman as Johnny Q. Loco

== Staff ==
- Directors: Miguel-Angel Soria, John Menier
- Writers: Miguel-Angel Soria, Alejandra M. Gomez
- Music: Kevin P. Green
- Artistic Director / Associate Producer: Fernando Flores
- Executive Producers: Miguel-Angel Soria, Alejandra M. Gomez
- Associate Producer: Tim Foley (from the Irish folk music group Skelpin)
- Stars: Crystal Brooke Alforque Carmen Boatwright

== See also ==
- The Biscuit Brothers (similar music series for children)
