= El Lay =

El Lay may refer to:

- a song from the 1981 Los Illegals album Internal Exile
- a song from the 1991 NOFX album Ribbed
- a song from the 2011 Snoop Dogg album Doggumentary

== See also ==
- LA (disambiguation)
- Los Angeles
