= Los Illegals =

American Chicano punk band

- Origin: Los Angeles
- Genres: Chicano punk
- Years active: 1979 – present
- Labels: A&M records "Internal Exile" produced by Mick Ronson and Los Illegals, Executive producer David Anderle
- Members: Willie Herrón; Bill Reyes; Manuel Valdez; Tony Valdez; Jesus Velo

Los Illegals is an American Chicano punk band from Los Angeles.

Formed in 1979 artist/muralist Willie Herrón (keyboards, vocals), civil rights activist Jesus "Xiuy" Velo (bass), drummer Bill Reyes, and guitarist brothers Manuel and Antonio "Tony" Valdez (who also perform with their Mariachi parents & relatives). They were one of the early framers of U.S. Roc en Espanol in the early 1980s.

The Smithsonian Institution exhibition, American Sabor, called Los Illegals "one of the most important East L.A. bands of the 1980s".

== Background ==
Released in 1981, the song "El Lay" featured Herron singing about his stepfather's arrest for washing dishes in L.A. The song became a Raza Anthem and brought the group's rising notoriety to Europe and Japan. Its cover art was meant to evoke the danger of the punk rock movement and the cultural roots of the group. The group was the first of the Club Vex groups to sign with a major label releasing Internal Exile produced by David Bowie's Mick Ronson on A&M records in 1983. The song "El Lay" was included in the album. But the relationship soon soured after the label rejected their next LP (Burning Youth) and partnership with UK's Stiff Record's producer Wally Brill (999, Elvis Costello) for its experimentation with Mexican instrumentation coupled with the band's unwillingness to use stereotypical icons (velvet Elvis paintings etc.) for publicity. Tied to a label unwilling to release it, and in debt for the LP's recording costs, they then illegally distributed it on cassette only in Mexico—for free.

The band struck a deal with the Franciscan nuns to open and run the legendary Club Vex at Self Help Graphics, Catholic Youth Organization building in East Los Angeles. There, they booked and introduced Eastside to Westside groups (such as The Brat, X, Bad Religion, and Thee Undertakers) to open up new horizons and enable themselves and others to play and tour with other major 1980s groups including The Clash, Bauhaus, The Motels, and Berlin. A visit to the club by Los Lobos (then an acoustic traditionalist Mexican folk group) convinced the band to rethink itself, return electric, and follow the path set by Club Vex. They were contemporaries of The Plugz from Texas and The Zeros of San Diego. The venue's street credibility kickstarted a music and art renaissance crossing cultural and geographical boundaries. For this, the LA Weekly named them among the ten best bands from East L.A.

In the early 1980s they were one of the first Chicano bands touring into Mexico playing alongside and meeting pioneer rockeros like El Tri and Tijuana No, Jaguares and Maldita Vecindad gaining respect on both sides of the border despite the original hostility displayed against them. They were actually being pelted on stage in both the U.S. (being called "wetbacks") and Mexico (this time being called "Pochos"- not truly Mexican). They shared experiences and knowledge with the fledgling scene winning the first "Outstanding Roc En Espanol Artist" California Music Award (BAMMY) from the Critics and Readers polls of the BAM/Rocket and Tower Pulse magazines.

Outspoken diplomatically and politically, the band has finally been receiving its long overdue accolades and is featured in various prominent music history and university textbooks. Most notable are Barrio Rhythm, and Land of 1,000 dances: The History of Chicanos in Rock & Roll.

In film, its Agnès Varda's French Masterpiece "Mur Murs", the Soundtrack for Stand and Deliver, and with Chuck D. of Public Enemy, Laurie Anderson and Cassandra Wilson in the D.A. Penebaker documentary and soundtrack: Searching for Jimi Hendrix (Capital). Also appearing alongside Santana, War, & Los Lobos on the historical compilation Ay Califas! History of Raza Rock of the 70's & 80's.

In the face of anti-illegal immigrant legislation they are on the move again this time as "cultural collaborators": beginning with the highly praised CD, Concrete Blonde y Los Illegals on Miles Copeland's ARK-21/Virgin label. The vocals were primarily in Spanish. They accompanied the release of their CD with a performance with Concrete Blonde at the House of Blues on May 5, 1997. In that show, the band changed the refrain for "Still in Hollywood" to "Still in the Barrio", and featured covers of Led Zeppelin's "Immigrant Song" and Jimi Hendrix's "Little Wing". MTV credited Los Illegals for "not only sav[ing] the show from the depths of sentimentality but also [giving] it meaning and resonance beyond that night." The album, however, seemed to have been less well-received. Los Angeles Times reviewer Enrique Lopetegui rated the album 2-½ out of 4 stars, opining that "there are plenty of good moments here" but "very few strong songs"; he singled out the "Chicano rap" record "Ode to Rosa Lopez", about a witness in the O. J. Simpson murder case, for praise as the "riskiest" track on the album. Jae-Ha Kim of the Chicago Sun-Times rated it 1-½ out of 4 stars, finding a lack of cohesion and a failure to showcase Napolitano's distinctive voice. Thom Owens of AllMusic's rating was 2-½ out of 5 stars, finding the project to be "a stylistic departure that reads better than it plays" due to weak songwriting.

They also collaborated with Tijuana punk legends "Mercado Negro" for the Rockefeller US/Mexico Culture Fund sponsored compilation CD, MexAmerica produced by Rubén Guevara for Angelino Records, later with Emmy winning journalist Ruben Martinez and Rock en Espanol stars "Maldita Vecindad" for the theater piece "Border Ballad" (the companion to his Book "Crossing Over: Tales From the New Frontier"), also writing, and performing with new talent (i.e. the EMI soundtrack of the Showtime series "Resurrection Boulevard" as their alter egos "The Chizmosos"). Lately they co-produced a series of racially diverse SRO "no coffee or bongos" electronica/noise poetry theater performances ("The Spine of Califas") with of San Diego's legendary Taco Shop Poets and several other performers/artists to which a college tour, book, CD and short film are in the offering and planning stages. The group is the subject of two documentaries of their history as Pachuco punks one entitled "Destined to fuck up" and the other a National PBS documentary special on Chicano Rock & Roll for airing in 2006.

It has been said about the group that in this era of disposable pop culture where "commitment and consciousness" are words passed around and marketed all too casually, "Los Illegals have a history of actively and physically proving the power of music to unite people."

== Discography ==
- Albums
  - Internal Exile -1983
  - Concrete Blonde y Los Illegals -1997
- Singles
  - Ellay – 1981

== See also ==
- Chicano music
