= Dolores del Río =

Mexican actress (1904–1983)

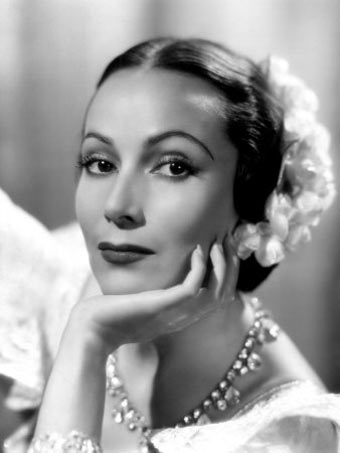
- Del Río in 1935
- Born: María de los Dolores Asúnsolo y López Negrete; 3 August 1904; Victoria de Durango, Durango, Mexico
- Died: 11 April 1983 (aged 78); Newport Beach, California, U.S.
- Resting place: Rotonda de las Personas Ilustres, Mexico City
- Occupation: Actress
- Years active: 1925–1978
- Spouses: Jaime Martínez del Río (m. 1921; div. 1928) Cedric Gibbons (m. 1930; div. 1941) Lewis A. Riley (m. 1959)
- Partner: Orson Welles (1940–1943)
- Relatives: Ramon Novarro (cousin); Andrea Palma (cousin); Julio Bracho (cousin)

Dolores del Río (Note: Spanish pronunciation: [doˈloɾes del ˈri.o].) (born María de los Dolores Asúnsolo y López Negrete; 3 August 1904 – 11 April 1983) was a Mexican actress whose career spanned more than 50 years. Along with a notable movie career in the Golden Age of Hollywood during the 1920s and 1930s, she was considered one of the most important female figures in the Golden Age of Mexican cinema during the 1940s and 1950s, as well as one of the most beautiful actresses of the era. Regarded as the first major female Latin American crossover superstar in Hollywood, she is a quintessential representation of the female face of Mexico in the world. For her contribution to the film industry, she has a star on the Hollywood Walk of Fame.

Del Río was born in Victoria de Durango into a wealthy and aristocratic Mexican family of Spanish ancestry. After being discovered by an American director in Mexico City, she relocated to Los Angeles and made her screen debut in the romantic comedy film Joanna (1925). Del Río subsequently starred in several box-office hits such as What Price Glory (1926), Resurrection (1927), Ramona (1928), and Evangeline (1929). At the peak of her fame in the silent era, she came to be considered a sort of feminine version of Rudolph Valentino, a 'female Latin Lover'. With the advent of talkies, she acted in a range of genres, from contemporary crime melodramas to musical comedies and romantic dramas. Del Río's most successful films of that decade include The Bad One (1930), Bird of Paradise (1932), Flying Down to Rio (1933), and Madame Du Barry (1934). By the end of the 1930s, she was labeled "box office poison" and her movie career soon began to decline. In the early 1940s, she returned to her native country and naturally joined the Mexican film industry, which at that time was at its peak. Del Río helped boost Mexican cinema worldwide, becoming one of the most popular actresses of the Golden Age of Mexican cinema.

Del Río's first Spanish-language film was the historical drama Flor Silvestre (1943), her first movie of an extended collaboration between Emilio "El Indio" Fernández and Pedro Armendáriz. Other well-known films in which Del Río starred in this period were María Candelaria (1944), Las Abandonadas (1945), La Otra (1946), La Malquerida (1949), La casa chica (1950), Doña Perfecta (1951), El Niño y la Niebla (1953), and La Cucaracha (1959). For her work in Las Abandonadas, Doña Perfecta, and El Niño y la Niebla, Del Río won the Ariel Award for Best Actress. Over time, she was cast in Hollywood movies again, including Flaming Star (1960) and Cheyenne Autumn (1964), but the federal government of the United States accused her of being a communist sympathizer, and she was unable to accept work abroad. When the ban lifted, she returned to the U.S. to perform on stage, as well as in television. Later in life, she became known for her work promoting the arts and for her philanthropic endeavors. Del Río's final screen appearance was in the drama film The Children of Sanchez (1978).

== Early life and education ==
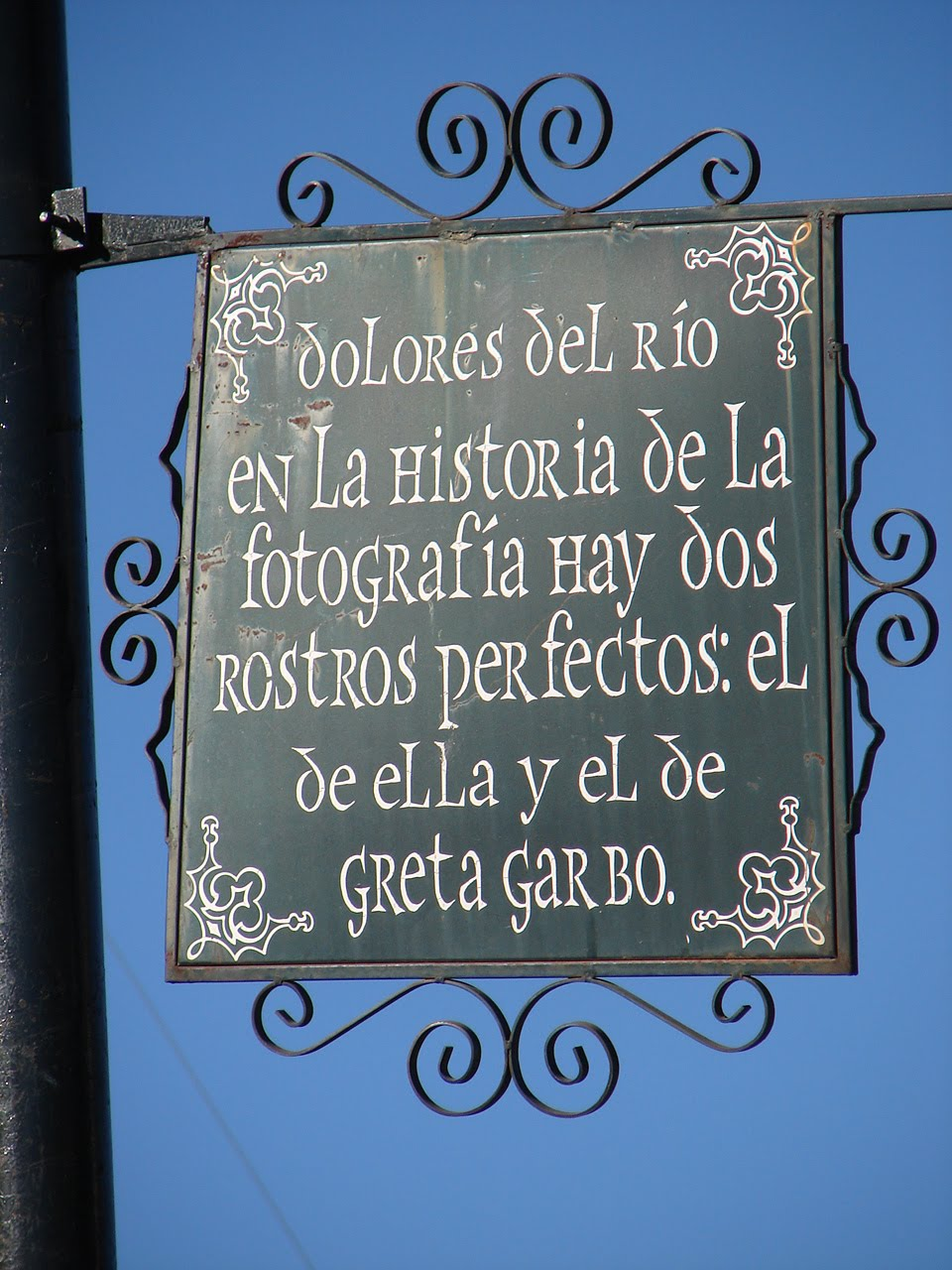
Commemorative plaque at the house where Dolores del Río was born, located in Durango City, Mexico. It reads: Dolores del Rio. In the history of photography there are two perfect faces: hers and Greta Garbo's

María de los Dolores Asúnsolo y López Negrete was born in Victoria de Durango, Mexico on 3 August 1904, (Note: Del Río gave her birth date as 3 August 1906 when she arrived in the U.S., reportedly to avoid ageism in the film industry. Although her year of birth has also been reported as 1905, she was born in 1904.) daughter of Jesús Leonardo Asúnsolo Jacques, son of wealthy farmers and director of the Bank of Durango, and Antonia López Negrete, who belonged to one of the richest families in the country, whose lineage went back to Spain and the viceregal nobility. Antonia Negrete's first cousin was Agustín López-Negrete who was wounded in the foot September 1894 by Pancho Villa.

Her parents were members of the Mexican aristocracy that existed during the Porfiriato (period in the history of Mexico when the dictator Porfirio Díaz was the president). On her mother's side, she was a cousin of the filmmaker Julio Bracho and of actors Ramón Novarro (one of the 'Latin Lovers' of the silent cinema) and Andrea Palma (another prominent actress of the Mexican cinema). On her father's side, she was a cousin of the Mexican sculptor Ignacio Asúnsolo and the social activist and model María Asúnsolo. Additionally, she was the aunt of the actress Diana Bracho.

Del Río's family lost all its assets during the Mexican Revolution that spanned from 1910 to 1920. Durango aristocratic families were threatened by the insurrection that Pancho Villa was leading in the region. The Asúnsolo family decided to escape, her father to the United States, and she and her mother to Mexico City on a train, disguised as peasants. In 1912, the Asúnsolo family reunited in Mexico City and lived under the protection of then-president Francisco I. Madero, who was a cousin of Mrs. Asúnsolo.

Del Río attended the Collège Français de Saint-Joseph, a college run by French nuns and located in Mexico City. She also developed a great taste for dance, that awakened in her when her mother took her to one of the performances of the Russian dancer Ana Pavlova, where she was fascinated by seeing her dance and decided to become a dancer herself. She confirmed her decision later when she witnessed the performances of Antonia Mercé "La Argentina" in Mexico City. She then persuaded her mother to allow her to take dance lessons with the respected teacher Felipita López. However, she suffered from great insecurity and felt like an 'ugly duckling'. Her mother commissioned the renowned painter Alfredo Ramos Martínez (famous painter of the Mexican aristocracy) to paint a portrait of her daughter. The portrait helped her overcome her insecurities. In 1921, aged 17, del Río was invited by a group of Mexican women to dance in a party to benefit a local hospital. At this party, she met Jaime Martínez del Río y Viñent, son of a wealthy family. Jaime had been educated in the United Kingdom and had spent some time in Europe. After a two-month courtship, the couple wed on 11 April 1921. It was from him that she inherited her artistic surname.

Her honeymoon with Jaime lasted two years and they spent it traveling through Europe, where during a stop in Spain, Del Río danced for the king and queen of Spain (Alfonso XIII and Victoria Eugenie), who were fascinated to see her perform a dance for the soldiers of the war in Morocco. The king and queen thanked her deeply, and the queen gave her a photograph. Returning to Mexico, Jaime decided to dedicate himself to growing cotton at his ranch called Las Cruces, in Nazas, Durango. However, a fall in the world cotton market in 1924, caused an economic crisis for both and had to settle in Mexico City under the economic protection of their respective families. For her part, she had to sell her jewelry to try to recover some of the fortune she had lost with her husband. In addition to this, Dolores arrived pregnant when they returned to the country and suffered complications that could not be overcome, which caused a miscarriage, after which the doctors recommended her not to get pregnant again since it would be very dangerous, taking away the possibility of having children.

== Career ==
=== 1925–1929: Silent film stardom ===
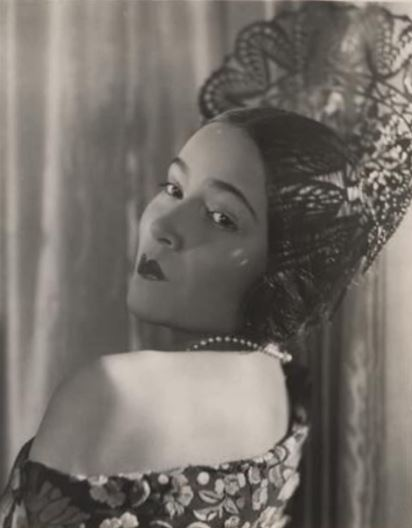
Del Río in Joanna (1925)

In early 1925, the painter Adolfo Best Maugard, close friend of del Río and her husband, visited their home and with him was an American filmmaker Edwin Carewe, an influential director at First National Pictures, who was in Mexico for the wedding of actors Bert Lytell and Claire Windsor. Carewe was fascinated with del Río and became determined to have her, so he invited the couple to work in Hollywood. He convinced Jaime, saying he could turn his wife into a movie star, “The female equivalent of Rudolph Valentino.” Jaime thought that this proposal was a response to their economic needs. Deep down, he could also fulfill his old dream of writing screenplays in Hollywood. Breaking with all the canons of Mexican society at that time and against their families wishes, they journeyed by train to the United States to start a career in film within that country. They arrived in Hollywood on 27 August of that year, where del Río was contracted by Carewe and he began to act as her agent, manager, producer and director. Her name was shortened to 'Dolores Del Rio' with the middle D capitalized. (Note: According to Hall, "Hollywood lore" holds that Carewe and the publicist Harry D. Wilson chose to capitalize Del Rio and remove the accent, "orthographical changes that made it inaccurate in Spanish". An alternative version credits Adolfo Best Maugard, a Mexican painter and director. The use of "del Rio" in Mexico, prior to Carewe's involvement, supports the latter theory. An obituary of film scholar Ana M. López in the Journal of Latin American Cultural Studies notes that the subject signed her name Del Rio and López used that spelling to reflect "the transnationality that this different signing of her name signified".) Seeking to get her wide public attention, Carewe made a report dedicated to del Río in the major magazines in Hollywood which said:

"Dolores Del Rio, the heiress and First Lady of the High Mexican Society, has come to Hollywood with a cargo of shawls and combs valued at $ 50,000 (is said to be the richest girl in her country thanks to the fortune of her husband and her parents). She will debut in the film Joanna, led by her discoverer Edwin Carewe".

She made her film debut in Joanna (1925), directed by Carewe and released that year. In the film del Río plays the role of Carlotta De Silva, a vamp of Spanish-Brazilian origin, but she appeared for only five minutes. While continuing with his advertising campaign for del Río, Carewe cast her in a secondary role in the film High Steppers (1926), starring Mary Astor. In the same year, Carl Laemmle, the head of Universal Studios, cast del Río in the comedy The Whole Town's Talking. These films were not big hits, but helped increase her profile with the movie-going public. Del Rio got her first starring role in the comedy Pals First (1926) also directed by Carewe.

In 1926, the filmmaker Raoul Walsh called del Río to cast her in the war film What Price Glory?. The film was a commercial success, becoming the second highest-grossing title of the year, grossing nearly $2 million in the United States alone. That same year, thanks to the remarkable progress in her career, she was selected as one of the WAMPAS Baby Stars of 1926, along with fellow newcomers Joan Crawford, Mary Astor, Janet Gaynor, Fay Wray and others.

In 1927, United Artists became interested in del Río's career and signed a contract with her and Carewe. Under the production of the studio, the film Resurrection (1927), was filmed. Rod La Rocque was chosen to play her co-star. Due to the success of the film, del Río quickly began shooting The Loves of Carmen, again directed by Raoul Walsh.

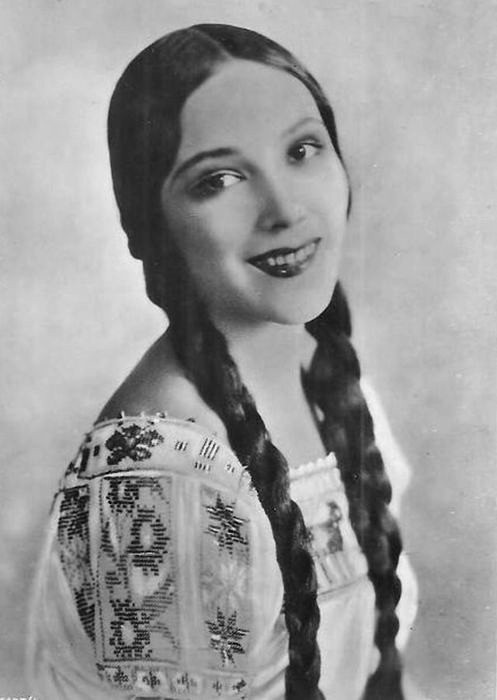
Del Río in Ramona (1928)

In 1928, del Río filmed No Other Woman (1928), directed by Lou Tellegen. When actress Renée Adorée began to show symptoms of tuberculosis, del Río was selected for the lead role of the MGM film The Trail of '98, directed by Clarence Brown. The film was a huge success and brought favorable reviews from critics. Also in 1928, she was hired again by United Artists for the third film version of the successful novel Ramona, directed again by Carewe. The success of the film was helped by the same name musical theme, written by L. Wolfe Gilbert and recorded by del Río. Ramona was the first United Artists film with synchronized sound and it is also one of the first Hollywood films to feature a soundtrack.

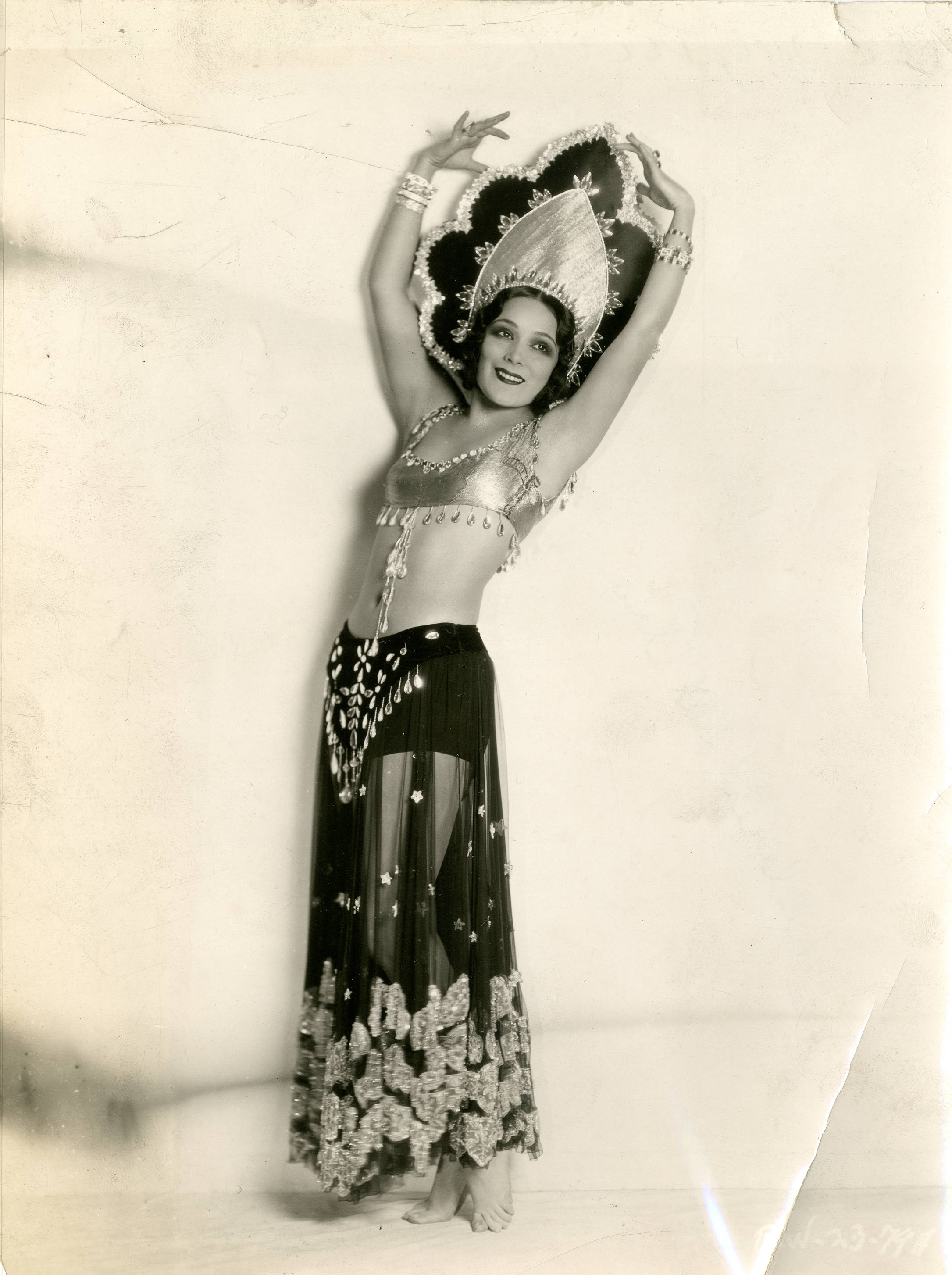
Dolores del Río in 1928

In late 1928, Hollywood was concerned with the conversion to sound films. On 29 March, at Mary Pickford's bungalow, United Artists brought together Pickford, del Río, Douglas Fairbanks, Charles Chaplin, Norma Talmadge, Gloria Swanson, John Barrymore, and D. W. Griffith to speak on the radio show The Dodge Brothers Hour to prove they could meet the challenge of talking movies. Del Río surprised the audience by singing ‘Ramona’ proving to be an actress with the skills needed for sound cinema.

Although her career blossomed, her personal life was turbulent. Her marriage to Jaime Martínez ended in 1928. After a brief separation, Dolores filed for divorce. Six months later, she received news that Jaime had died in Germany. Carewe continued to pursue a marriage to del Río, but his attempts to maintain influence over her contributed to the further deterioration of their relationship. In the same year, del Rio made her third film with Raoul Walsh, The Red Dance (1928). Her next project was Evangeline (1929) a new production of United Artists also directed by Carewe and inspired by the epic poem by Henry Wadsworth Longfellow. The film was accompanied again by a theme song written by Al Jolson and Billy Rose and played by del Río. Like Ramona, the film was released with a Vitaphone disc selection of dialogue, music and sound effects.

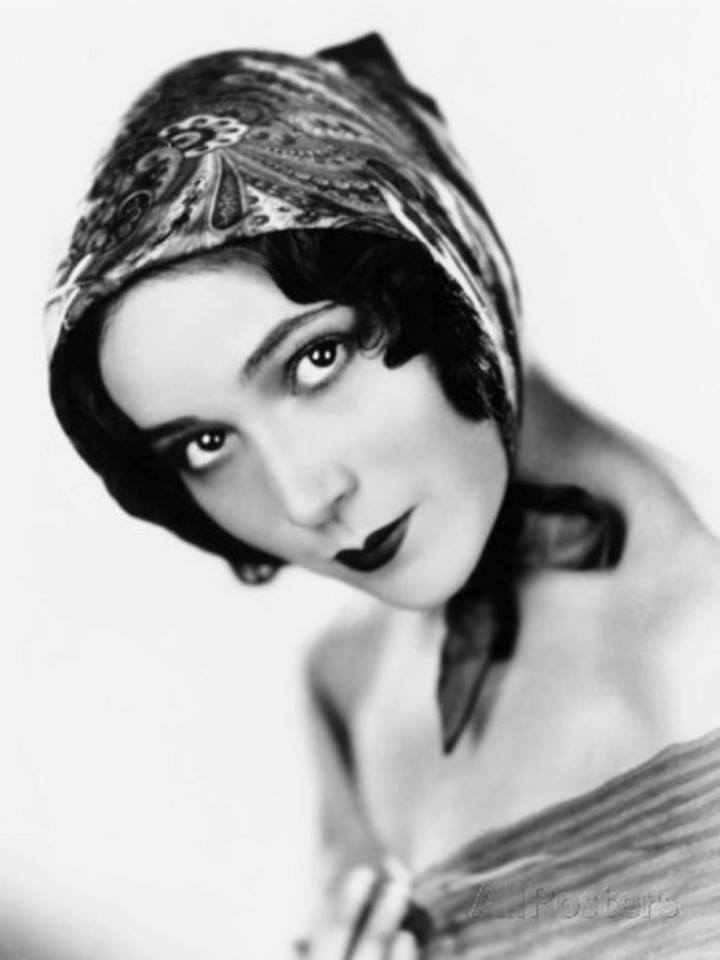
Dolores del Río in Evangeline (1929)

Edwin Carewe still had ambitions to marry del Río, with the intent that they become a famous Hollywood couple. Carewe prepared his divorce from his wife Mary Atkin and seeded false rumors about a romance with del Río in campaigns of his films. During the filming of Evangeline, del Río considered separating professionally from Carewe, seeking support and advice from United Artists lawyers, since Carewe had an exclusivity contract signed by her.

In New York, following the successful premiere of Evangeline, and upon recommendation of the firm's lawyers, del Río declared to the reporters: "Mr. Carewe and I are just friends and companions in the art of the cinema. I will not marry Mr. Carewe." Eventually, she canceled her contract with him. Furious, Carewe filed criminal charges against del Río alleging breach of contract. Advised by United Artists lawyers, del Río reached an agreement with Carewe out of court, paying compensation. In spite of this settlement, Carewe started a campaign against her. In order to eclipse her, he filmed a new sound version of Resurrection starring Lupe Vélez, another popular Mexican film star and with whom the public assumed that del Río had a rivalry.

Having finally broken off professionally from Carewe, del Río was prepared for the filming of her first talkie: The Bad One, directed by George Fitzmaurice. The film was released in June 1930 with great success. Critics said that del Río could speak and sing in English with a charming accent. She was a suitable star for the talkies.

=== 1930–1936: Transition to sound films ===
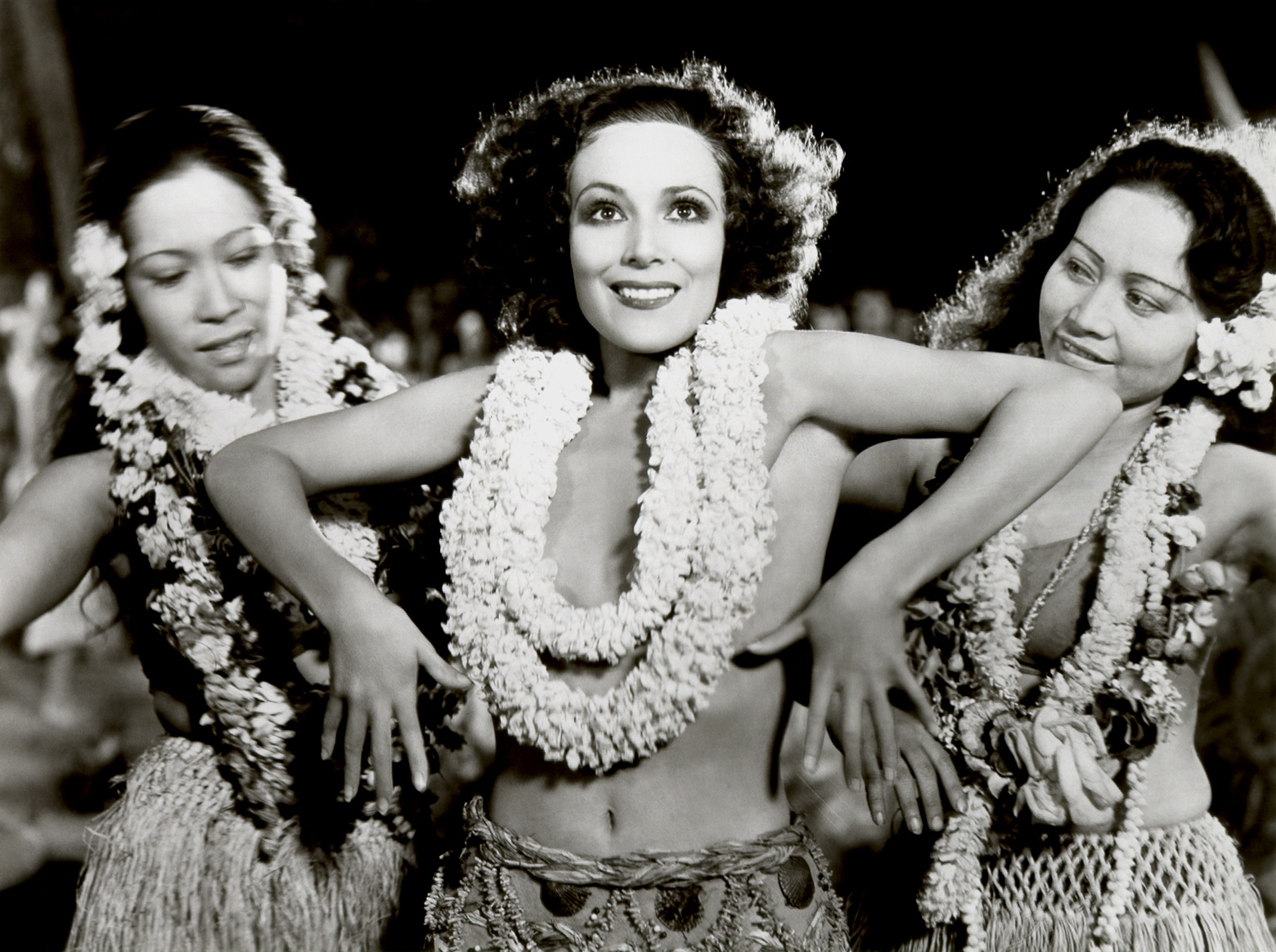
Dolores del Río in Bird of Paradise (1932)

In 1930, del Río met Cedric Gibbons, an art director at Metro-Goldwyn-Mayer and one of the most influential men in Hollywood, at a party at Hearst Castle. The couple began a romance and married on August 6, 1930. Shortly after her marriage, del Río fell seriously ill with a severe kidney infection. The doctors recommended long bed rest. This caused the end of her contract with United Artists because the studio considered that if actresses were inactive they were not profitable. When she regained her health, she was hired exclusively by the producer David O. Selznick as an exclusive star of RKO Pictures. Her first film with the studio was Girl of the Rio released in 1931, and directed by Herbert Brenon.

In 1932, Selznick entrusted filmmaker King Vidor with a new and ambitious project. Selznick told Vidor: "I want del Río and Joel McCrea in a love story in the South Seas. I didn't have much of a story for the film, but be sure that it ends with del Río jumping into a volcano." The film Bird of Paradise (1932) was shot in Hawaii and del Río became a beautiful Polynesian native. The film premiered on 13 September 1932 in New York, earning rave reviews. Bird of Paradise became somewhat controversial due to del Rio's daring costumes, as well as a revealing swimming scene. This film was made before the Production Code was strictly enforced.

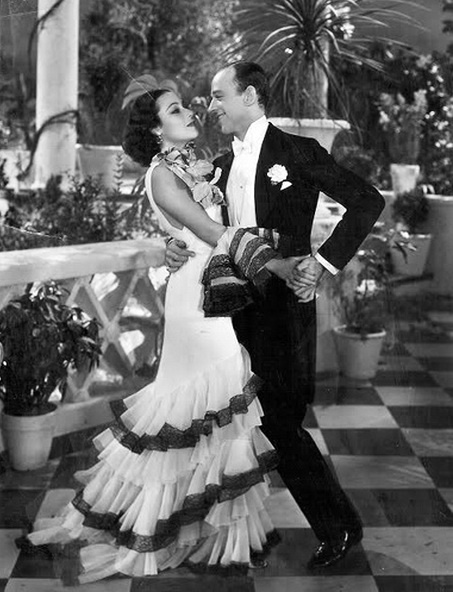
Del Río and Fred Astaire in Flying Down to Rio (1933).

As RKO got the result they expected, in 1933 they quickly decided to have del Rio do another film, a musical comedy directed by Thornton Freeland: Flying Down to Rio. In the film, Fred Astaire and Ginger Rogers first appeared as dance partners. It featured del Río opposite Fred Astaire in an intricate dance number called Orchids in the Moonlight. In this film, del Rio became the first major actress to wear a two-piece women's bathing suit on-screen. But after the premiere, RKO were worried about their economic problems and decided not to renew del Río's contract.

Jack Warner offered her a starring role in two films for Warner Bros. The studio was interested in promoting del Río as the answer to MGM's Greta Garbo and Paramount's Marlene Dietrich. Del Río's first project with Warner was the musical comedy Wonder Bar (1934), directed by Lloyd Bacon. Busby Berkeley was the choreographer and Al Jolson her co-star. Del Río shared the female lead role with Kay Francis. But del Río and Jolson were gradually stealing the show. Del Río's character grew, while the character of Francis was reduced so she threatened several times to leave filming. The film was released in March 1934 and was a success for Warners.

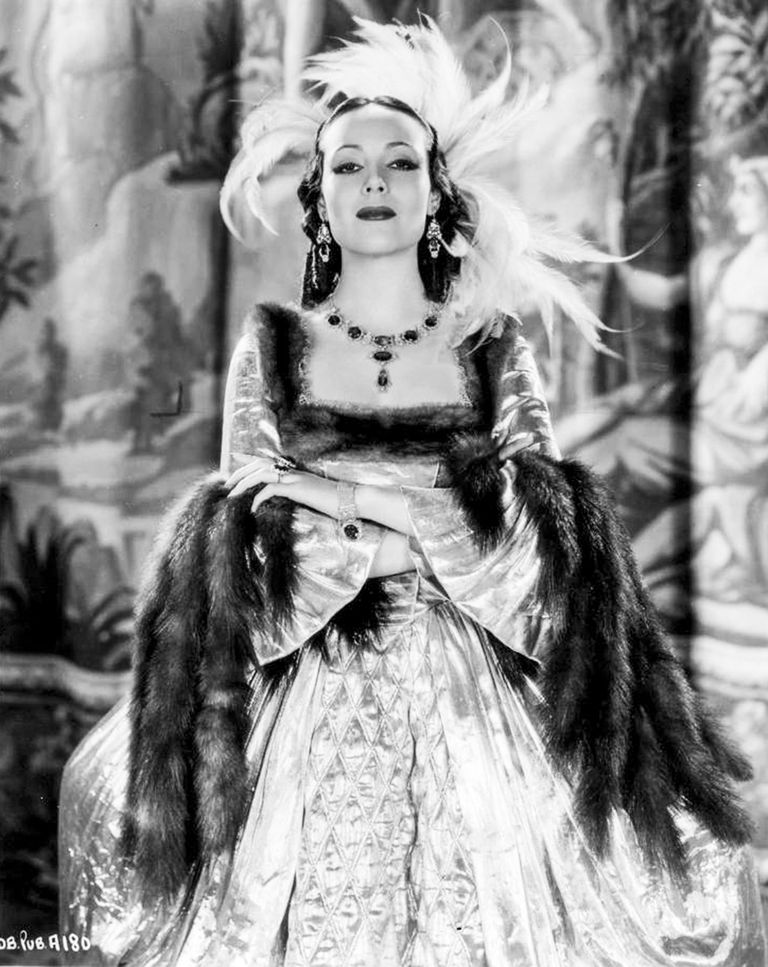
Del Río in Madame Du Barry (1934).

Her second film with Warners was Madame Du Barry (also 1934) with William Dieterle as director. Dieterle focused on her beauty with the help of an extraordinary wardrobe designed for Dolores by Orry Kelly (considered one of the most beautiful and expensive at the time). But Madame Du Barry was a major cause of dispute between the studio and the Hays Code office, primarily because it presented the court of Louis XV as ‘a sex farce centered around del Rio’. The film was severely mutilated by censorship and was not the success anticipated. Even so, the film is considered one of the most popular del Río films in her period in Hollywood cinema.

In the same year, del Río, along with the Mexican Hollywood stars Ramón Novarro and Lupe Vélez, attended a special screening of the Mexican film ¡Que viva México! in Los Angeles. The film was directed by the Russian filmmaker Sergei Eisenstein, and was accused of promoting Communism in California with nationalist sentiment and socialist overtones. It was the first time that del Río was accused of being a communist in the United States, a circumstance that would eventually have consequences in her career inside the American film industry.

Warner called her again in 1935 to star in another musical comedy called In Caliente (1935), where she portrayed a sultry Mexican dancer who has an affair with the character of actor Pat O'Brien. Around the same time, she starred in I Live for Love (also 1935), with Busby Berkeley as director. The film had dance numbers and Berkeley focused on her glamour with a sophisticated wardrobe. The last film she made with Warners was The Widow from Monte Carlo of 1936, which went unnoticed. The studio terminated its contract with del Río after expectations were not met.

=== 1937–1942: Decline in Hollywood ===
With the support of Universal Studios, in 1937 del Río filmed The Devil's Playground opposite Chester Morris and Richard Dix. However, despite the popularity of the three stars, the film was a failure. Del Río would decide to emigrate and sign a contract with 20th Century Fox to star in two films with George Sanders. She appeared with him in Lancer Spy of 1937 and International Settlement of 1938. Both films were box-office failures. These cinematographic failures caused her to focus on advertising, becoming known for advertisements in "Lucky Strike" (a cigarettes brand) and "Max Factor" (a makeup brand).

Cedric Gibbons used his influence with Metro-Goldwyn-Mayer and gained for del Río the main female role in the 1940 film The Man from Dakota. But despite his position in the studio, Gibbons was never able to help his wife achieve a higher profile, as the main figures of that company at the time were Garbo, Norma Shearer, Joan Crawford and Jean Harlow. Studio executives admired del Río's beauty, but her career did not interest them, as at the time, Latin stars had few opportunities to shine at the studio. She was put on a list entitled "box office poison", (along with stars like Crawford, Garbo, Katharine Hepburn, Marlene Dietrich, Mae West and others). The list was submitted to Los Angeles newspapers by an independent movie theater whose point was that these stars' high salaries and public prominence did not counteract the low ticket sales for their movies.

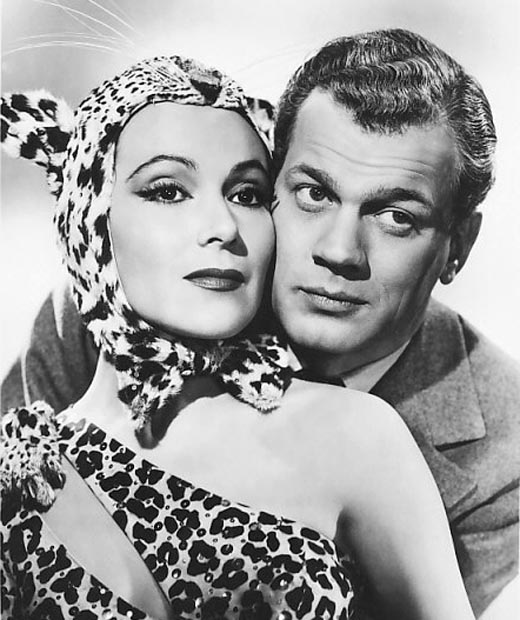
Del Río with Joseph Cotten in Journey into Fear (1943)

Amid the decline of her career, her marriage with Gibbons began to experience a crisis and the two began to drift apart. In 1940 del Río met actor and filmmaker Orson Welles at a party organized by Darryl Zanuck. The couple felt a mutual attraction and began a discreet affair, which caused her divorce from Gibbons. While looking for ways to resume her career, she accompanied Welles in his shows across the United States, in works on radio and performances at the Mercury Theatre. Del Río was at his side during the filming and controversy of Citizen Kane (1941). The film, considered a masterpiece today, caused a media scandal by directing open criticism against the media magnate William Randolph Hearst, who began to boycott Orson's projects.

At the beginning of 1942, she started working on Journey into Fear (released in 1943) with Norman Foster as director and Welles as producer. Her relationship with Welles, in the midst of the Citizen Kane scandal, somehow affected her, as her character was drastically reduced in the film. Nelson Rockefeller, in charge of the Good Neighbor policy (and also associated with RKO through his family investments), hired Welles to visit South America as an ambassador of goodwill to counter fascist propaganda about Americans. Welles left the film four days later and traveled to Rio de Janeiro as part of his goodwill tour. Welles, involved in filming the carnival in Rio de Janeiro, falling into the party and excesses, and the news came soon to the United States. Offended and outraged, del Río decided to end her relationship with Welles through a telegram that he never answered. Weeks later, her father died in Mexico. Due to these personal and professional crises, she decided to return to Mexico, commenting:

"Divorced again, without the figure of my father. A film where I barely appeared, and one where they were really showing me the way of the art. I wanted to go the way of the art. Stop being a star and become an actress, and that I could only do in Mexico. I wish to choose my own stories, my own director, and camera man. I can accomplish this better in Mexico. I wanted to return to Mexico, a country that was mine and I did not know. I felt the need to return to my country".

=== 1943–1959: Mexican cinema ===
Del Río had been sought by Mexican film directors since the late 1930s. She was considered to star in the Mexican films La Noche de los Mayas and Santa. Of the latter, Orson Welles himself helped correct the script. But economic circumstances were not favorable for the entry of del Río to the Mexican cinema. She also maintained friendly ties with figures of Mexican art and culture (such as Diego Rivera and Frida Kahlo). After breaking off her relationship with Welles, del Río returned to Mexico.

As soon as she returned to her country, del Río began to listen to movie offers. Mexican filmmaker Emilio "El Indio" Fernández invited her to film Flor silvestre (1943). Fernandez was a great admirer and he was eager to direct her. Flor silvestre was del Río's first Spanish-language film. The film gathers a successful film crew consisting of Fernandez, the cinematographer Gabriel Figueroa, the screenwriter Mauricio Magdaleno and del Río and Pedro Armendariz as the stars. The film was a huge box office success and allowed del Río to maintain her prestige as an actress.

Subsequently, del Río and Fernández’ film crew filmed María Candelaria. The film tells the story of a native indigenous woman from the lake region of Xochimilco, who is despised by her people. Fernández has said that he wrote an original version of the plot on 13 napkins while sitting in a restaurant. He was anxious because he was in love with del Río and could not afford to buy her a birthday present. However, there were tense moments during the filming of the film. Fernández could not hide his love for del Río and, faced with her rejection of his advances, he began to be very demanding and violent. Del Río showed great professionalism and finished filming, despite several threats to abandon the film. María Candelaria was the first Mexican film to be screened at the Cannes International Film Festival where it won the Grand Prix (now known as the Palme d'Or) becoming the first Latin American film to do so.

Her third film with Fernández Las Abandonadas (1944), was a then controversial film where del Río plays a woman who gives up her son and falls into the world of prostitution. The film was about to be banned due to protests from the Mexican army, because the film spoke of a criminal gang infiltrated in the Mexican armed forces. These controversies ensured the film's box office success. Her performance as an actress was recognized by the Mexican Film Academy and she received the Silver Ariel Award for Best Actress.

Bugambilia (1944) was her fourth movie directed by Fernández. As del Rio did not respond to the director's love advances, Bugambilia filming became a torture for both and for the rest of the team, who had to endure the mood swings of the director and the constant threats of del Río leaving the film. When the film was completed in January 1945, del Río announced that she would never again work with Fernández.

In 1945, del Río filmed La selva de fuego (1945) directed by Fernando de Fuentes. The script of this film came to her in error, because of a confused messaging. The film had been specially created for María Félix, another notable Mexican movie star. Félix meanwhile, received the script for Vértigo (1946), a film originally created for del Río. When the two stars realized the mistake they refused to return the scripts. Del Río was fascinated by playing a different character in which she showed off with a provocative costume, remembering her time as a sex symbol in Hollywood. Because of this anecdote the press began speculating a strong rivalry between del Río and Felix.

After breaking off her film collaboration with Emilio Fernández, del Río began a film partnership with director Roberto Gavaldón. Del Río plays twin sisters in the film La Otra (1946), her first film under Gavaldón's direction. This film later inspired the movie Dead Ringer, starring Bette Davis in 1964.

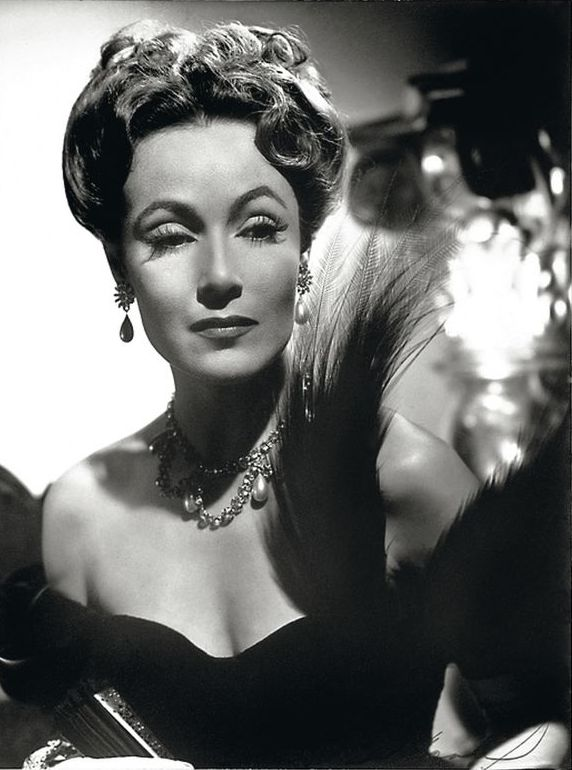
Dolores del Río in a photograph taken by Annemarie Heinrich, c. 1948

In 1947, del Río was invited by the film director John Ford to play the role of an indigenous woman who falls in love with a fugitive priest (Henry Fonda) in the film The Fugitive, an adaptation of the novel The Power and the Glory by Graham Greene. The movie was filmed in Mexico and Emilio Fernández also served as associate producer. But from the beginning of its filming, the film caused controversy in the United States, accusing it of being a promoter of communism. Del Río was attacked again for having taken part in what was being called "a communist project".

After the filming of The Fugitive, del Río traveled to Argentina to film Story of a Bad Woman (Historia de una mala mujer, 1948), a film adaptation of Oscar Wilde's Lady Windermere's Fan, directed by Luis Saslavsky. While shooting in Buenos Aires, del Río was pursued by none other than First Lady Evita Peron. Peron invited del Río to tea, but del Río declined because of her filmmaking schedule. The next day, the government issued an order that the film industry was to shut down completely so del Río could have tea with Mrs. Peron. But her friendship with Evita was not viewed favorably by Hollywood's communist hunters either. In an interview with Hedda Hopper from Argentina, del Río claimed to be unconcerned about the controversy surrounding her two last films. According to Hopper, "Del Río said controversy added millions of dollars to the profit of the pictures".

Del Río accepted working again with Emilio Fernández and her film team in the film La Malquerida (1949). The film is based on the novel of the Spanish writer Jacinto Benavente. Del Río gained good notices for her portrayal of Raymunda, a woman confronted by her own daughter for the love of a man. The role of her daughter was played by actress Columba Dominguez. Domínguez was Fernández's new romantic partner, and this situation caused tension on the set and speculation from the press.

In 1949, del Río met the American millionaire Lewis A. Riley in Acapulco. Riley was well known in Hollywood in the 1930s and 1940s for his collaboration with the Hollywood Canteen and his brief romance with Bette Davis. They started a romance. That same year, del Río's cousin, activist and feminist Maria Asúnsolo, asked her to sign a document for a ‘conference for the world peace’. Del Río never imagined that this document would point her out again as a supporter of international communism.

Del Río starred in Doña Perfecta (1951), based on the novel by Benito Perez Galdos. For this work she won her second Silver Ariel Award for Best Actress. Gavaldón directed her again in the film El Niño y la Niebla (1953). Her portrayal of an overprotective mother with a mental instability attracted critical acclaim and she was honored with her third Silver Ariel Award.

In 1954, del Río was slated to appear as the wife of Spencer Tracy's character in the 20th Century Fox film Broken Lance. But the U.S. government denied her permission to work in the United States, accusing her of being sympathetic to international communism. The document signed by her cheering for world peace, as well as her links with figures openly communist (as Diego Rivera and Frida Kahlo were) and her past relationship with Orson Welles, had been interpreted in the United States as sympathy with communism. She was replaced in the film by Katy Jurado. Del Río was one of the many on the blacklist of McCarthyism. She reacted by sending a letter to the U.S. government, stating:

"I believe that after all this, I have nothing [for which] to reproach myself. I'm a catholic woman who only wants to live in peace with God and with men".

While her situation was being remedied in the United States, del Río accepted the proposal of filming in Spain another adaptation of a novel by Benavente, Señora Ama (1955), directed by her cousin, the filmmaker Julio Bracho. Unfortunately the prevailing censorship in the Spanish cinema caused the film to be seriously truncated during editing.

In 1956, her political situation in the United States was resolved. She began to listen with interest to theatrical offerings. Del Río was already thinking that the play Anastasia of Marcelle Maurette, would be a good choice for her debut. To prepare for this new facet of her career, she engaged the services of Stella Adler as her acting coach. Del Río debuted successfully at the theater on the Falmouth Playhouse in Massachusetts on July 6, 1956 and to continue with a tour of seven other theaters throughout New England. She took advantage of her return to the United States and granted an interview to Louella Parsons to make clear her political position: "In Mexico we are worried and fighting against communism." In 1957, she was selected as vice president of the jury of the 1957 Cannes Film Festival. She was the first woman to sit on the jury. In 1957, she debuted in television in the role of a Spanish lady in the American television series Schlitz Playhouse of Stars, opposite Cesar Romero.

In 1959, Mexican filmmaker Ismael Rodríguez brought del Río and her alleged rival María Félix together in the film La Cucaracha. The meeting of the two actresses, considered the main female stars of Mexican cinema, was a success at the box office. Although the press speculated that a war would break out between the two actresses, the truth is that the filming went smoothly and both ended up forming friendly ties. That same year, she married Lewis Riley in a private ceremony in New York.

=== 1960–1970: Return to Hollywood, television and theatre ===
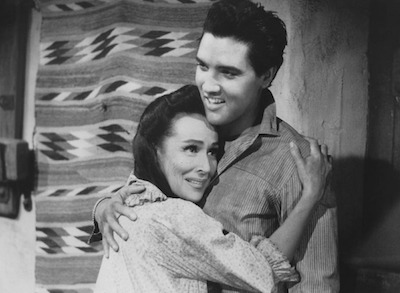
Del Río with Elvis Presley in Flaming Star (1960)

Del Río and Riley founded their own production company called Producciones Visuales. and they produced numerous theater projects featuring del Río. Mexican writer Salvador Novo became the translator of her plays. Her first production in Mexico City was Lady Windermere's Fan, which she had made as a film in Argentina a decade earlier. She toured Mexico in the play, an enterprise that was both financially and critically successful, and she later took it to Buenos Aires. In 1958, the play The Road to Rome, would mark the reunion in the theater of the film couple del Río-Pedro Armendáriz. But the temperamental Armendáriz left the project in rehearsals due to differences with the director. He was replaced by another actor, but the project did not prosper and was a failure at the box office.

Del Río returned to Hollywood after 18 years. She was hired by Fox to play the role of the mother of Elvis Presley's character in the film Flaming Star (1960), directed by Don Siegel. Her arrival in Hollywood caused excitement and she was warmly received by fellow actors, the press and staff members, some of whom she had known since her arrival in Hollywood in 1925. In 1964 she appeared in John Ford's Cheyenne Autumn, playing the role of the Cheyenne mother of Sal Mineo. Figures like Richard Widmark, Karl Malden, James Stewart and Edward G. Robinson also appear in the film. In 1967, the Italian filmmaker Francesco Rosi invited her to be part of the movie More Than a Miracle (also 1967) with Sophia Loren and Omar Sharif. She played Sharif's character's mother.

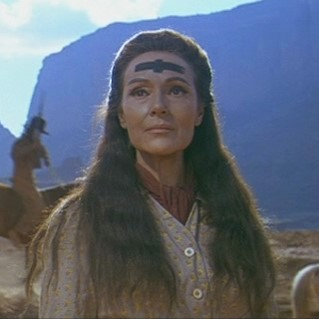
Del Río in Cheyenne Autumn (1964)

Throughout the 1960s, del Río produced and starred in Mexico in theater projects such as Ghosts (1962), Dear Liar: A Comedy of Letters (1963), La Voyante (1964) and The Queen and the Rebels (1967)

She also appeared in the American TV shows The Dinah Shore Chevy Show (1960), I Spy, Branded (1966) and in the TV movie The Man Who Bought Paradise (1965), opposite Angie Dickinson and Buster Keaton. In 1968, del Río first performed on Mexican television in an autobiographical documentary narrated by her.

In 1970, she produced and starred in theater The Lady of the Camellias. The project was originally directed by the Broadway producer José Quintero. However, despite having received a high salary, the producer did not commit to the project and constantly appeared drunk. Del Río and her husband decided to fire him and were legally sued by the director. The matter was cleared up in court and delayed the premiere of the play, which was a great box office success, despite production problems. Del Río was acclaimed at daring to play a 65-year-old Marguerite Gautier. Her last appearance on television was in a 1970 episode of Marcus Welby, M.D..

=== 1970–1983: Philanthropy and cultural ambassador ===
Since the late 1950s, del Río became a main promoter of the Acapulco International Film Review, serving as host on numerous occasions. In 1966, del Río was co-founder of the Society for the Protection of the Artistic Treasures of Mexico with the philanthropist Felipe García Beraza. The society was responsible for protecting buildings, paintings and other works of art and culture in México.

On January 8, 1970, she, in collaboration with other renowned Mexican actresses and performers, such as Adela Peralta Leppe, founded the union group "Rosa Mexicano", which provided a day nursery for the children of the members of the Mexican Actor's Guild. Del Río was responsible for various activities to raise funds for the project and she trained in modern teaching techniques. She served as the president from its founding until 1981. After her death, the day nursery adopted the official name of Estancia Infantil Dolores del Río (The Dolores del Río Day Nursery), and today remains in existence.

In 1972, she helped found the Cultural Festival Cervantino in Guanajuato. Her deteriorating health led her to cancel two television projects in 1975. The American television series Who'll See the Children? and Mexican telenovela Ven Amigo. In her work in supporting children she became a spokeswoman of UNICEF in Latin America and recorded a series of television commercials for the organization.

In 1976, del Río was invited to serve as president of the jury of the San Sebastian International Film Festival, in Spain. There she generated a controversy about her position before the Mexican film The Heist. When the film was shown, del Río suddenly got up from her seat, disgusted by what for her was a repulsive film, "a filth of such magnitude wrapped in the patriotic banner". In the face of this scandal, the film was denied the opportunity to win an award.

In 1978, Dolores made her last film appearance in The Children of Sanchez, directed by Hall Bartlett and starring Anthony Quinn. There she interprets the role of the grandmother. In the same year, the Mexican American Institute of Cultural Relations and the White House gave Dolores a diploma and a silver plaque for her work in cinema as a cultural ambassador of Mexico in the United States. During the ceremony she was remembered as a victim of McCarthyism.

At the age of 76, del Río appeared on the stage of the Palace of Fine Arts theater the evening of October 11, 1981 for a tribute at the 25th San Francisco International Film Festival. During the ceremony, filmmakers Francis Ford Coppola, Mervyn LeRoy and George Cukor spoke, with Cukor declaring del Rio as one of the "First Ladies of American Cinema". This was her last known public appearance. In 1982, she was awarded the George Eastman Award, given by George Eastman House for distinguished contribution to the art of film.

== Personal life ==
=== Public image and character ===
"Hollywood needs a high-society Mexican woman, one who may have been exposed to foreign culture and customs through travel, but who maintains the customs and the traces of the Mexican land. And then, the vulgar and picturesque stereotype, so damaging because it falsities our image, will disappear naturally. This is my goal in Hollywood: All my efforts are turned toward filling this gap in the cinema. If I achieve this it will be the height of my artistic ambition and perhaps I'll give a small glory for Mexico. "I'd love to appear in fine, emotional dramas...and am eager to play in stories concerning my native people, the Mexican race. It is my dearest wish to make fans realize their real beauty, their wonder, their greatness as a people. The vast majority seem to regard Mexicans as a race of bandits, or laborers, dirty, unkempt, and uneducated. My ambition is to show the best that's in my nation".

— Del Río commenting about her role as a Mexican woman in Hollywood.

Del Río always projected a special elegance with her beauty, more than just a 'Latin bombshell' such as other actresses like Lupe Vélez. Del Rio's intrinsic elegance was apparent even off-screen. Del Río strongly identified with her Mexican heritage despite her growing fame and her transition to 'modernity'. She also felt strongly about being able to play Mexican roles and bemoaned the fact that she was not cast in them. She never relinquished her Mexican citizenship and said in 1929 (at the height of her popularity) that she wanted "to play a Mexican woman and show what life in Mexico really is. No one has shown the artistic side – nor the social".

Del Río was considered one of the prototypes of female beauty in the 1930s. In 1933, the American film magazine Photoplay conducted a search for "the most perfect female figure in Hollywood", using the criteria of doctors, artists and designers as judges. The 'unanimous choice' of these selective arbiters of female beauty was Del Río. The question posed by the search for the magazine and the methodology used to find 'the most perfect female figure' reveal a series of parameters that define femininity and feminine beauty at that particular moment in US history. Larry Carr (author of the book More Fabulous Faces) said Del Río's appearance in the early 1930s influenced Hollywood. Women imitated her style of dress and makeup. A new kind of beauty occurred, and Del Río was the forerunner. She is also considered the pioneer of the two piece swimsuit.

According to Austrian-American filmmaker Josef von Sternberg, stars such as Del Río, Marlene Dietrich, Carole Lombard and Rita Hayworth helped him to define his concept of glamour in Hollywood.

When Del Río returned to Mexico, she radically changed her image. In Hollywood, she had lost ground to the modernity of the faces. In Mexico, she had the enormous fortune that filmmaker Emilio Fernández emphasized her Mexican indigenous features. She did not come to Mexico as the Hollywood 'Latin bombshell' transforming her makeup to highlight her indigenous features. Del Río defied the change that her appearance suffered in her native country: "I took off my furs and diamonds, satin shoes and pearl necklaces; all swapped by the shawl and bare feet."

Del Río's contemporaries comment about her image:

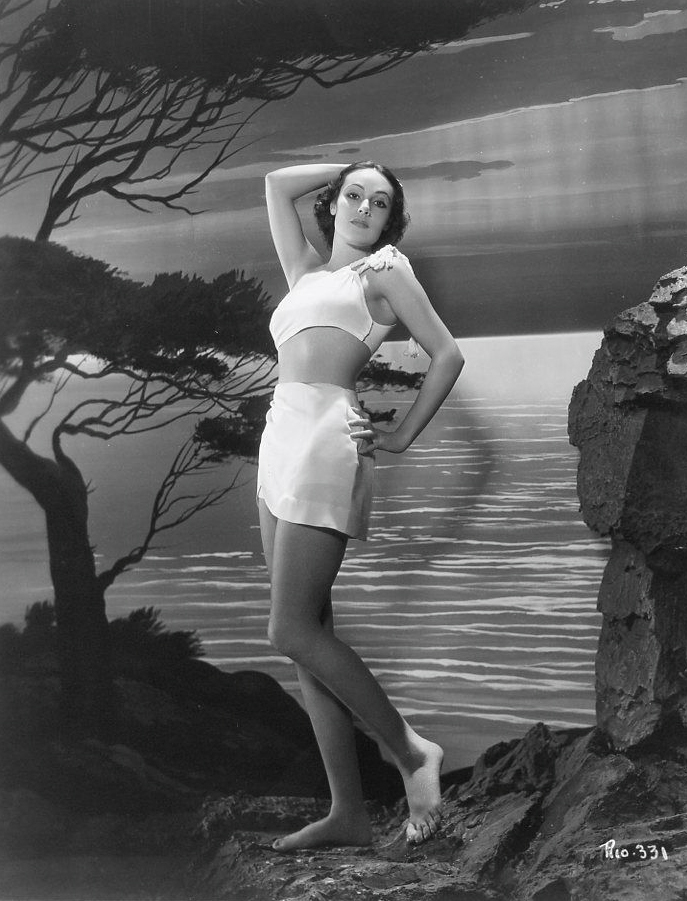
Del Río is considered a pioneer on wearing the two piece swimsuit later known as the bikini. Here she is posing in a publicity photograph for the film In Caliente (1935) while wearing this type of garment

American actress Joan Crawford: "Dolores became, and remains, as one of the most beautiful stars in the world".

German-American actress and singer Marlene Dietrich: "Dolores del Río was the most beautiful woman who ever set foot in Hollywood". "Ah, this is the real beauty. We blondes have to work at it".

Fashion designer Elsa Schiaparelli: "I have seen many beautiful women in here, but none as complete as Dolores del Río!"

Mexican painter Diego Rivera: "The most beautiful, the most gorgeous of the west, east, north and south. I'm in love with her as 40 million Mexicans and 120 million Americans who can't be wrong".

Mexican novelist Carlos Fuentes: "Garbo and Dietrich were women turned into goddesses. Del Río was a goddess about being a woman".

American photographer Jerome Zerbe: "Dolores del Río and Marlene Dietrich are the most beautiful women I've ever photographed".

Russian-American photographer George Hoyningen-Huene: "The bone structure of her head and body is magnificent. Her skin is like ripe fruit".

Australian-American costume designer Orry-Kelly: "I draped her naked body in jersey. She wanted no underpinnings to spoil the line. When I finished draping her she became a Greek goddess as she walked close to the mirror and said, It is beautiful. Gazing into the mirror, she said in a half-whisper, Jesus, I am beautiful. Narcissistic? Probably yes, but she was right. She looked beautiful".

Mexican cinematographer Gabriel Figueroa: "I have had great beauties in front of my camera. But the facial bones of Dolores del Río are incomparable. That has been said many times. What has not been said is that she had a privileged smooth skin, a beautiful brown color and a body really perfect".

Del Río herself commented on her face and image: "Take care of your inner beauty, your spiritual beauty, and that will reflect in your face. We have the face we created over the years. Every bad deed, every bad fault will show on your face. God can give us beauty and genes can give us our features, but whether that beauty remains or changes is determined by our thoughts and deeds."

In 1952, she was awarded the Neiman Marcus Fashion Award and was called the "best-dressed woman in America".

=== Relationships ===
Del Río married Jaime Martínez del Río in 1921. Her marriage ended in 1928. The differences between the couple emerged after settling in Hollywood. In Mexico she had been the wife of Jaime Martinez del Río, but in Hollywood Jaime became husband of a movie star. The trauma of a miscarriage added to the marital difficulties and del Río was advised not to have children. After a brief separation, Dolores filed for divorce. Six months later, she received news that Jaime had died in Germany.

In 1930, del Río met Cedric Gibbons, an art director at MGM and one of the most influential men in Hollywood, at a party at Hearst Castle. The couple began a romance and finally married on August 6, 1930. The del Rio-Gibbons were one of the most famous couples of Hollywood in the early thirties. They organized 'Sunday brunches' in their Art Deco house at 757 Kingman Avenue in the Rustic Canyon neighborhood of Pacific Palisades. Many celebrities would attend and play tennis or swim in the pool including Marlene Dietrich, Greta Garbo, Gary Cooper and Cary Grant. The couple divorced in 1941. Del Río alleged before the judge in her divorce that her relationship with her husband had become cold and distant due to their work commitments.

In 1949 she met the American millionaire Lewis A. Riley in Acapulco. Riley was known in the Hollywood cinema in the forties for being a member of the Hollywood Canteen, an organization created by movie stars to support relief efforts in World War II. At that time Riley was engaged in a torrid affair with Bette Davis. Del Río and Riley started a romance. In 1959, the couple married in New York after ten years of relationship. They remained together until her death in 1983.

Regardless of her marriages, at different times in her life some attribute romances with actor Errol Flynn, filmmaker John Farrow, writer Erich Maria Remarque, film producer Archibaldo Burns, and actor Tito Junco. Mexican filmmaker Emilio Fernández was one of her admirers. He said that he had appeared as an extra in several films of del Río in Hollywood just to be near her. The beauty and elegance of del Río had impressed him deeply. Fernández said: "I fell in love with her, but she always ignored me. I adored her ... really I adored her."

=== Orson Welles ===
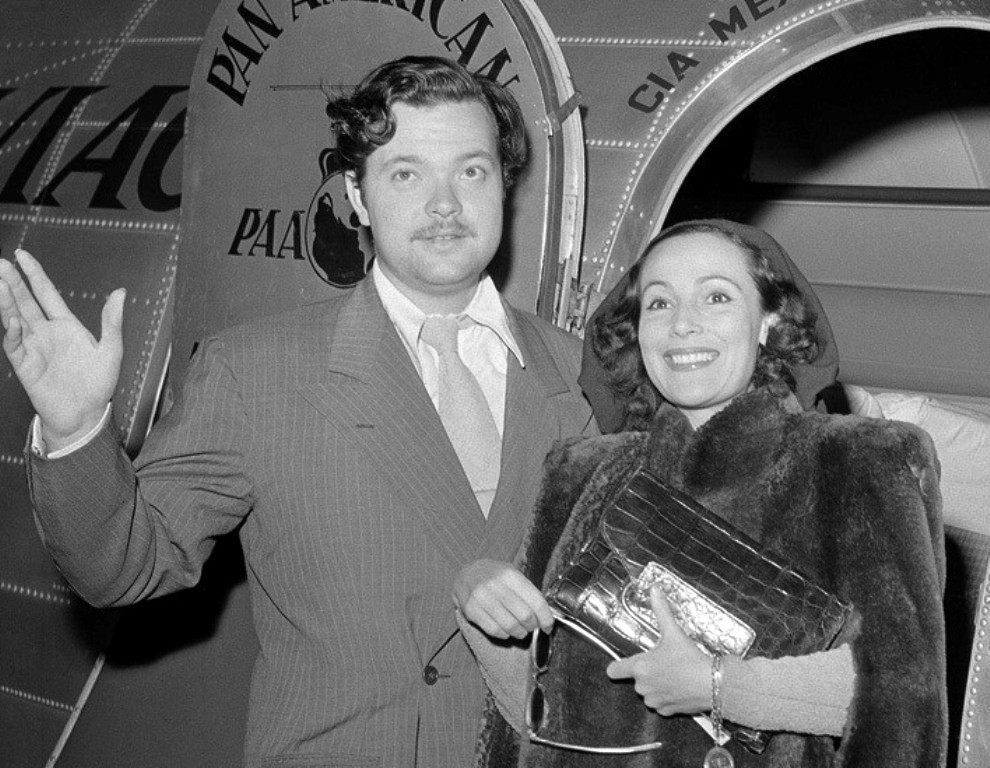
Del Río with Orson Welles in 1941

Del Río met actor and filmmaker Orson Welles at a party organized by Darryl Zanuck. The couple felt a mutual attraction and began a discreet affair. Welles had been infatuated with her since adolescence. He declared: "That's when I fell in love with her". He later said: "She changed my life". Their relationship was kept secret until 1941, when del Río filed for divorce from Cedric Gibbons. They openly appeared together in New York while Welles was directing the Mercury stage production Native Son. After del Río filed for divorce, she threw herself into Welles's chaotic world, considering his intellect "second to none, not even Shakespeare." Welles was equally complimentary. "She lives so graciously. Everyone around her loves her. She is the one girl you can be with and not feel the need for conversation. She has a mind full of talk, though, when she wants". Throughout the filming of Citizen Kane, del Río was often at the difficult Welles's side, soothing him when he banged his head against the wall and dealing with his insomnia as he abused Dexedrine. They acted together in the movie Journey into Fear (1943).

Her relationship with Welles ended after four years largely due to his infidelities. Welles, involved in filming the Rio Carnival in Rio de Janeiro, behaved promiscuously and the news came soon to the United States. Offended and outraged, del Río decided to end her relationship with Welles through a telegram that he never answered. He later married Rita Hayworth, "The New Dolores del Río of Hollywood".

But Welles never got over her completely, and off and on he went to Mexico in usually fruitless attempts to see her, or sent his children, whom she did receive. Rebecca Welles, the daughter of Welles and Hayworth, expressed her desire to travel to Mexico to meet Dolores on her 18th birthday. In 1962, Dolores received her at her home in Acapulco. After their meeting, Rebecca said: "My father considered Dolores the great love of his life. She is a living legend in the history of my family." According to Rebecca, until the end of his life, Welles felt for del Río a kind of obsession. For the rest of her life del Río kept a card with two beautiful slanted eyes (easily identifiable as Dolores's own) and a dove drawing along a banner inscribed with the word "always" and signed "Orson".

=== Alleged rivalries ===
There are many anecdotes about her rivalry with fellow Mexican actress Lupe Vélez. Del Río never understood the quarrel that Vélez kept with her. Vélez hated del Río, and called her "bird of bad omen". Del Río was terrified to meet her in public places. When this happened, Vélez was scathing and aggressive. Vélez openly mimicked del Río, ironically making fun of her elegance. But the prestige of del Río was known and respected, and Vélez could not ignore this. Vélez was popular, had many friends and devoted fans, but was not accepted in the same Hollywood circles as del Río. Vélez spoke ill of del Río, but del Río never mentioned her name in an offensive way.

There was media speculation about a strong rivalry between del Río and María Félix, another successful Mexican film actress. The novelist Carlos Fuentes portrayed del Río and Félix as aging sisters in his 1982 play Orquideas en la luz de la luna (Orchids in the Moonlight). The fictionalized version of Félix calls del Río "chased but not chaste" in a reference to the latter's involvement with Orson Welles. Félix said in her autobiography: "With Dolores I don't have any rivalry. On the contrary. We were friends and we always treated each other with great respect. We were completely different. She [was] refined, interesting, soft on the deal, and I'm more energetic, arrogant and bossy".

=== Final years and death ===
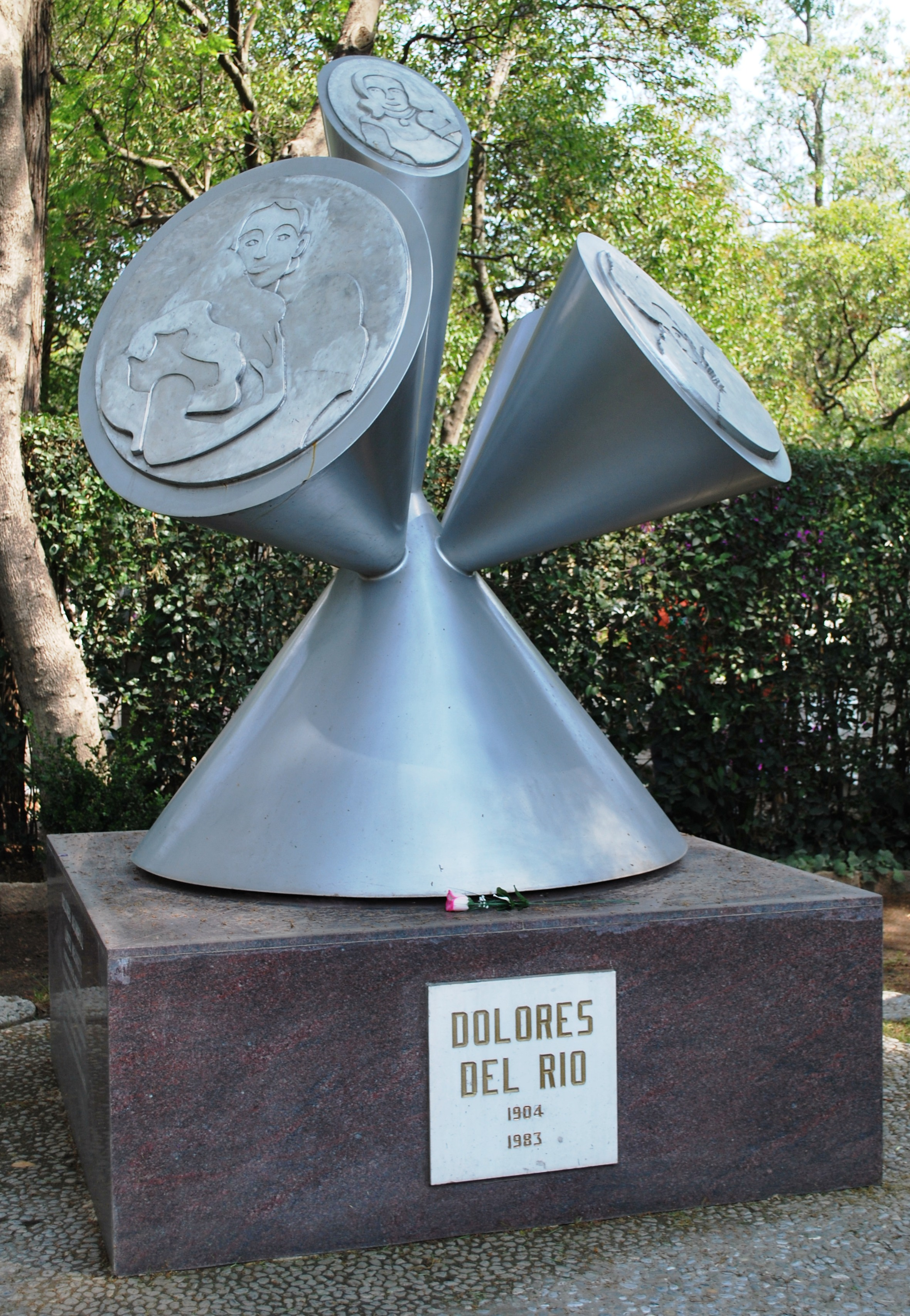
Dolores del Río grave located at Panteón de Dolores in Mexico City

In 1978, she was diagnosed with osteomyelitis. Del Río used to give herself vitamin injections periodically. One of the syringes is believed to have been contaminated and was diagnosed with hepatitis C in 1981. In 1982, del Río was admitted to Scripps Hospital, La Jolla, California, where hepatitis led to cirrhosis.

Del Río spent the last two years of her life at her Newport Beach residence with her husband Lew and only received visits from a few friends and family. The last two years of her life were spent seriously ill, with prolonged hospital stays. Before her death, she designated her husband Lew as her heir, ensuring that her portraits and art objects were placed in various museums after her death.

On April 11, 1983, Dolores del Río died from liver failure at the age of 78 in Newport Beach, California. It is said that the day she died, an invitation to attend the Oscars was sent to her. She was cremated and her ashes were moved from the United States to Mexico where they were buried at the Panteón de Dolores in Mexico City, Mexico. Lew Riley died in Newport Beach in 2005.

In 2004, to commemorate the centenary of her birth, and as part of a series of posthumous tributes, the Mexican government interred her remains at the Rotunda of Illustrious Persons, located in the same cemetery and where the remains are found of some of the most outstanding Mexican personalities of art and culture.

== Legacy ==
Del Río was the first Mexican actress to succeed in Hollywood. In her wake others followed including Lupe Vélez and Katy Jurado. In recent years, other Mexican stars that have achieved a place in Hollywood include Salma Hayek, and Eiza González.

=== In art and literature ===
The physical characteristics of del Río made her a figure of veneration even beyond death. From a young age, del Río had the intelligence to know how to surround herself with personalities of the intellectual environment. The Hollywood myth placed del Río in another area, as she became one of the women related to the renaissance of Mexican culture and customs.

The face of del Río was also the object of veneration for many artists who shaped her image on their canvases. In 1916, when del Río was 11 years old, she was first portrayed by Alfredo Ramos Martínez, a very popular artist among Mexican high society. In the 1920s, del Río was also embodied in the canvases of Mexican painters Roberto Montenegro and Ángel Zárraga. In 1938, the actress was portrayed by her close friend, the famous Mexican artist Diego Rivera. The portrait was made in New York. It was del Río's favorite portrait and occupied a special place in her home in Mexico. Rivera also captured the image of del Río in some of his paintings and murals, highlighting La vendedorea de flores, La pollera and La Creacion.

In 1941, del Río was also portrayed by the famous Mexican muralist José Clemente Orozco. The portrait was made at the request of Orson Welles. Unfortunately, when the artist painted the portrait he was already losing his sight. Del Río said: "He painted his tragedy on my face!" Although the portrait was not liked by the actress, it had a very important place in her home. Other artists who recorded her image in her paintings were Miguel Covarrubias, Rosa Rolanda, Antonieta Figueroa, Frances Gauner Goshman, Adolfo Best Maugard and John Carroll.

In 1970, the Instituto Nacional de Bellas Artes y Literatura, the Asociación Nacional de Actores, the Humane Society of the Artistic Treasures of Mexico and the Motion Picture Export Association of America paid her a tribute titled Dolores del Rio in the Art in which her main portraits and a sculpture by Francisco Zúñiga were exhibited.

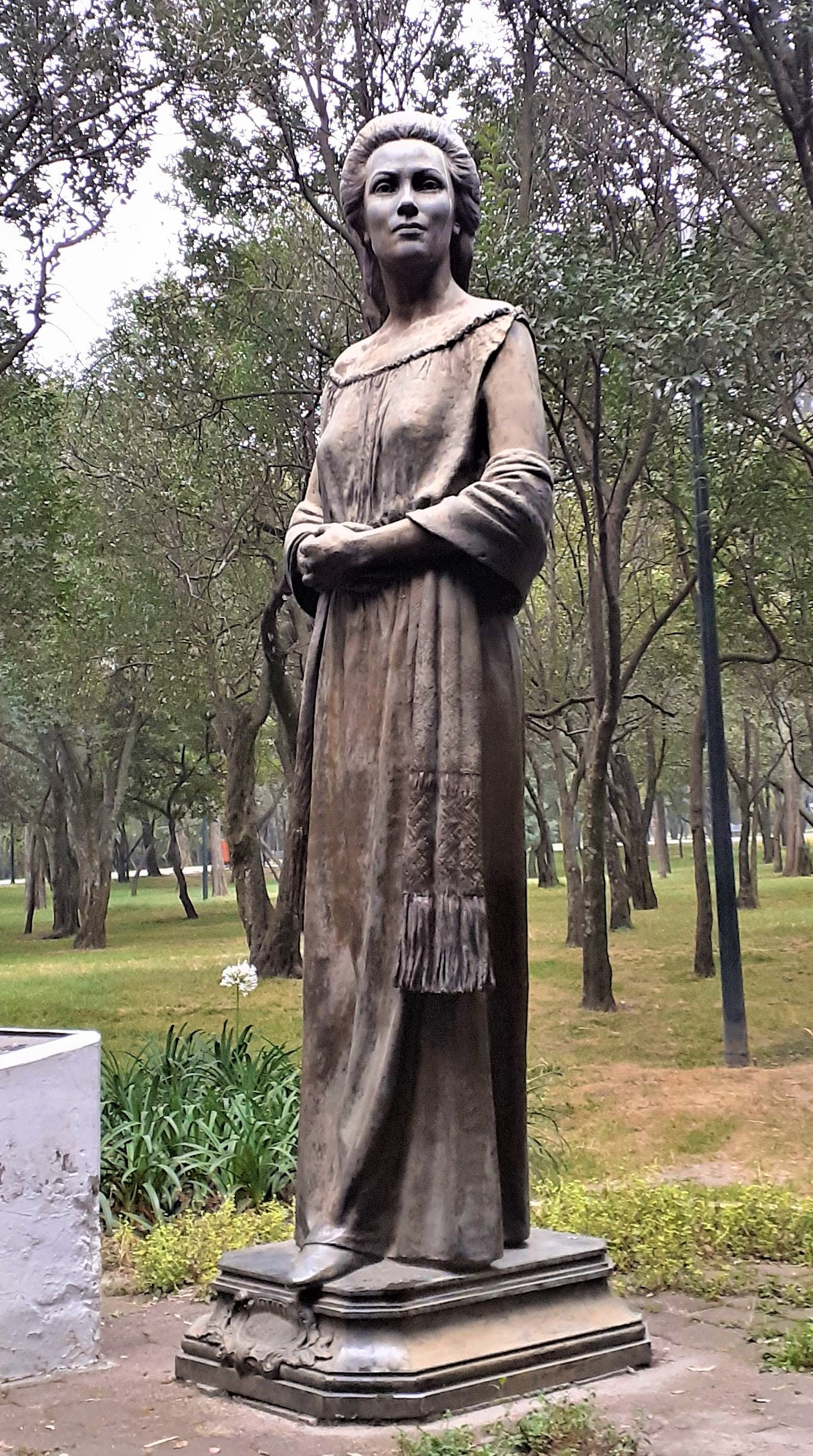
Dolores del Río statue in the Chapultepec Park in Mexico City.

In her will, del Río stipulated that all her artworks be donated to the Instituto Nacional de Bellas Artes y Literatura of Mexico, for display in various museums in Mexico City, including the National Museum of Art, the Museum of Art Carillo Gil and the Diego Rivera & Frida Kahlo House-Studio.

Del Río was the model of the statue of Evangeline, the heroine of Longfellow's romantic poem located in St. Martinville, Louisiana. The statue was donated by del Río, who played Evangeline in the 1929 film.

Poet Salvador Novo wrote her a sonnet and translated all her stage plays. She inspired Jaime Torres Bodet's novel La Estrella de Día (Star of the Day), published in 1933, which chronicles the life of an actress named "Piedad". Vicente Leñero was inspired by del Río to write his book, Señora. Carlos Pellicer also wrote her a poem in 1967. Other authors who wrote her poems were Xavier Villaurrutia, Celestino Gorostiza and Pita Amor. Carlos Monsiváis and Jorge Ayala Blanco also made her a tribute book on the occasion of the Ibero-American Film Festival of Huelva, in 1983. The book contains an essay by Monsiváis entitled Responsibilities of a face. Vicente Leñero also pays tribute to the book Señora.

Carlos Fuentes wrote Orquideas en la luz de la luna (Orchids in the Moonlight), his 1982 play depicting del Río and María Félix as sisters, in both English and Spanish. He began the drafting process in Spanish before certain jokes, as well as an American character named the Fan, lent themselves to English. According to a contemporary reviewer, "The fact that Dolores Del Rio herself transcended affiliation with a single country to become a universal symbol provides the bilingual/bicultural model on which this drama is based." The Chicago Reader nonetheless called the two stars "barely known in the United States anymore" in 1991 and questioned whether young audiences were familiar with either.

After her death, her photo archive was given to the Carso Center for the Study of Mexican History by Lewis Riley.

=== Memorials ===
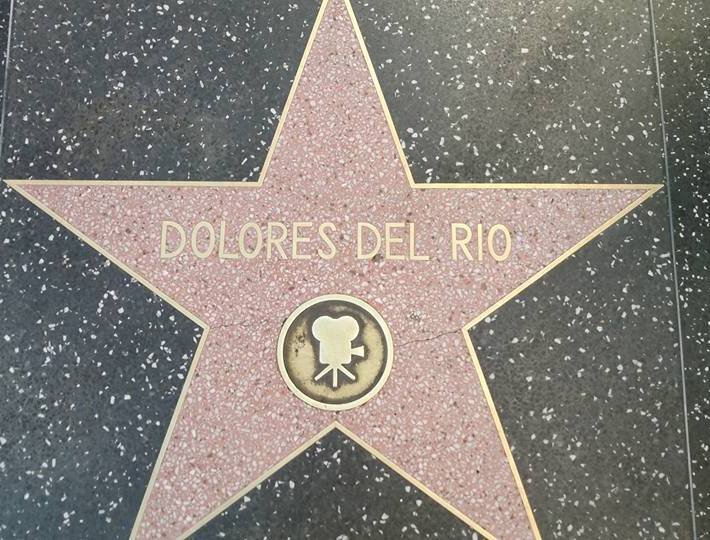
Dolores del Río's star in the Hollywood Walk of Fame

- She has her star on the Hollywood Walk of Fame at 1630 Vine Street in recognition of her contributions to the motion picture industry.
- Dolores del Río also has a statue at Hollywood-La Brea Boulevard in Los Angeles, designed by Catherine Hardwicke built to honor the multi-ethnic leading ladies of the cinema together with Mae West, Dorothy Dandridge and Anna May Wong.
- Del Río has also a mural painted on the east side of Hudson Avenue just north of Hollywood Boulevard painted by the Mexican-American artist Alfredo de Batuc.
- Del Río is one of the entertainers displayed in the mural "Portrait of Hollywood", designed in 2002 by the artist Eloy Torrez in the Hollywood High School.
- Del Río's memory is honored in three monuments in Mexico City. The first is a statue located in the second section of Chapultepec Park. The other two are busts. One is located in the Parque Hundido. and the other is in the nursery that bears her name.
- In Durango, Mexico, her hometown, an avenue is named after her, Blvd. Dolores del Río.
- Since 1983, the society Periodistas Cinematográficos de México (Mexican Film Journalists) (PECIME) has been giving the Diosa de Plata (Dolores del Río) Award for the best dramatic female performance.
- In 1995, fashion designer John Galliano realized a tribute to del Rio in his Fall /Winter collection Dolores.
- In 2005, on what was believed to be the centenary of her birth (she was actually born in 1904), her remains were moved to the Rotonda de las Personas Ilustres in Mexico City.
- Del Rio was the subject for a fashion collection by notable Mexican fashion milliner to the stars Gladys Tamez, paying tribute to her numerous roles in Mexican cinema.
- On 3 August 2017, the 113th anniversary of her birth, Google released a Google Doodle created by Google artist Sophie Diao honoring Del Río.
- After her death, actor Vincent Price used to sign his autographs as "Dolores del Río". When asked why, the actor replied: "I promised Dolores on her deathbed that I would not let people forget about her."

=== Characterizations ===
- Chester Gould, the creator of Dick Tracy, took Dolores del Río as inspiration to create Texie Garcia, one of Tracy's main enemies.
- She appeared in vintage footage in the Woody Allen's film Zelig (1983).
- She was played by the actress Lucy Cohu in the TV film RKO 281 in 1999.
- Del Río is one of the Mexican celebrities honored in a cameo in the Disney-Pixar animated movie Coco in 2017.
- She was played by the actress Elsa Ortiz in the streaming series María Félix: La Doña, produced by TelevisaUnivision.

== Filmography ==
Selected:

- Joanna (1925)
- What Price Glory? (1926)
- Resurrection (1927)
- The Loves of Carmen (1927)
- Ramona (1928)
- Evangeline (1929)
- Bird of Paradise (1932)
- Flying Down to Rio (1933)
- Wonder Bar (1934)
- Madame Du Barry (1934)
- In Caliente (1935)
- Devil's Playground (1937)
- Journey Into Fear (1943)
- Wild Flower (1943)
- María Candelaria (1943)
- Las Abandonadas (1944)
- Bugambilia (1944)
- La Otra (1946)
- The Fugitive (1947)
- The Unloved Woman (1949)
- Doña Perfecta (1951)
- El Niño y la niebla (1953)
- La Cucaracha (1959)
- Flaming Star (1960)
- Cheyenne Autumn (1964)
- More Than a Miracle (1967)
- The Children of Sanchez (1978)

Selected theatre roles:

- Anastacia (1956)
- Lady Windermere's Fan (1958)
- The Road to Rome (1959)
- Ghosts (1962)
- Dear Liar: A Comedy of Letters (1963)
- The Lady of the Camellias (1968)
