= Taco Shop Poets =

- Origin: United States
- Genres: Poetry, Spoken Word, Performance Art, Jazz, Punk, hip hop
- Years active: 1994–2004?
- Labels: Chorizo Tonguefire Press, Calaca Press
- Website: tacoshoppoets.com

Taco Shop Poets is the name of a poetry and spoken word collective formed in 1994 at a Poetry Series, Taco Shop Poetry, hosted by Adolfo Guzman-Lopez at the Centro Cultural de la Raza in Balboa Park, San Diego. It grew to a collective of over 30 poets, band members and performance artists based at El Campo Ruse on 16th St. in Downtown San Diego's East Village.

== History and work ==
The Taco Shop Poets are often credited in helping to revive, redefine, and revolutionize spoken word in San Diego and elsewhere. They employed a very aggressive style of guerilla poetry central to which are its improvisational nature and combination of punk and hip-hop influences. The collective's legacy reaches far beyond southern California and has spawned numerous copy-cat groups across the USA.

In 2002, members of the Taco Shop Poets and other like-minded individuals collaborated to create an artistic space to house and develop art. This developed into the non-profit organization, Voz Alta Project. Although the poets as a collective are no longer active on Voz Alta's board, most members participate in the Voz Alta movement as it continues to host events and artists.

The Taco Shop Poets are inactive as a collective, however each of the members are involved with performing or educating throughout the USA or abroad.

== Releases ==
A compilation of selected writings was released in 1999 by the Taco Shop Poets titled Chorizo Tonguefire. A compact disc by the same name featuring performances of some of the writings contained in the book was also released that year by Calaca Press.

In 2004, a second compact disc featuring offerings from raúlrsalinas and José Montoya titled Intersections was released.

The four longest standing group members, Adrian Arancibia, Adolfo Guzman-Lopez, Tomas Riley, and Miguel-Angel Soria, released a second anthology featuring their work, titled "Sugar Skull Sueños"- Paperback and Ebook (2012, Tintavox Press).

In addition, many members have ventured out and have releases on their own. Among these are:

Adrian Arancibia:
- "AVÍSALE! The wanderings, meanderings and slanderings of a chileno in aztlán" - Chapbook Edition (2005, Self Published)
- "El nido/The nest" - Chapbook Edition (2007, Self Published)
- "Atacama Poems" - Paperback Release (2007, City Works Press)
-"The Keeper/El guardador" - Limited Edition Release/Hand-Made (2013, La Ratona Cartonera)
- Untitled - Paperback Release (2015 Parentheses Press)

Bennie Herron under the alias of Eclipse Heru:
- "Microcrusifiction" - Audio CD (1994. FDI)
- "Bak 2 Tha Future" - Audio CD (1995, FDI)
- "Seed-n-Soil" - Audio CD (circa 1999(?), Independent Release)
- "Churches and Liquor Stores Vol. 1" - Audio CD (2003, On1Ent)

Paul Phruksukarn under the alias of ThaiMex:
- "Intuition is the Key" - Audio CD (1999, Infinite Shades Music)
- "Blind Issues" - Audio CD (2000, Infinite Shades Music)
- "No Luciano Just a Drum and a Piano" - Audio CD (2001, Infinite Shades Music)
- "Brand New Starts" - Audio CD (2009)

Tomás Riley:
- "Message From the New For Real" - Audio CD (2002, Independent Release)
- "Mahcic: Selected Poems" - Paperback Release (2005, Calaca Press) - "Post-Chicano Stress Disorder" (2008. Tinta Vox) - "How Does the Song GO?" (2021, Tinta Vox)

== Members ==
Taco Shop Poets has included poets Miguel-Angel Soria, Alurista, and collaborations from *Los Illegals, Quincy Troupe, José Montoya, Lalo Alcaraz, Willie Perdomo and Fran Ilich.
