= Voz Alta Project =

Multi-disciplinary art space in California, US

Coordinates: 32°42′9″N 117°8′50″W

The Voz Alta Project (originally named Voz Alta) is a multi-disciplinary art space in San Diego, California. It is located at 1754 National Avenue in the Barrio Logan neighborhood of San Diego

Voz Alta was founded in 2002 by the Taco Shop Poets. The Taco Shop Poets aimed to create a venue that would help in cultivating the next wave of Latino, Mexican, Chicana/o and border region artists. The space has hosted such guests as Lila Down, Harry Gamboa, and Howard Zinn.

The space is now a multicultural art space. It presents art shows and music events as well as other forms of visual and performing arts.
