= Group Therapy (Concrete Blonde album) =

Studio album by Concrete Blonde
- Released: January 15, 2002
- Genre: Alternative rock
- Label: Manifesto

Concrete Blonde chronology
Concrete Blonde y Los Illegals (1997)	Group Therapy (2002)	Live in Brazil 2002 (2003)

Professional ratings
Review scores
Source	Rating
AllMusic	3/5 stars

Group Therapy is the sixth studio album by alternative rock band Concrete Blonde, following their break-up and reunion. The album was originally released on January 15, 2002, by Manifesto Records.

== Track listing ==
No.	Title	Length
1.	"Roxy"	4:37
2.	"Violent"	6:46
3.	"When I Was a Fool"	4:51
4.	"True, Pt. 3"	7:25
5.	"Tonight"	5:03
6.	"Valentine"	3:33
7.	"Your Llorona"	5:07
8.	"Take Me Home"	4:42
9.	"Inside/Outside"	6:10
10.	"Fried"	5:05
11.	"Angel"	7:49
12.	"Memory"	4:00

== Charts ==
Chart (2002)	Peak position
US Independent Albums (Billboard)	15
