= East Los Streetscapers =

American art collective

East Los Streetscapers Public Art Studios is a muralist art collective and fine art studio based in East Los Angeles, California. Its members have executed over twenty murals and large-scale public artworks, primarily in the Los Angeles area.

== History ==
East Los Streetscapers grew out of the Chicano Mural Movement of the 1960s and 1970s, a strand of muralism that "began as an arm of struggle of claiming urban space" for Chicanos. It was founded by Wayne Alaniz Healy and David Rivas Botello in 1975. Alaniz and Botello met in elementary school, and when in the third grade, collaborated on a mural. However, they lost touch when Botello's family moved to nearby City Terrace.

In 1969, Botello co-founded Goez Art Studio, "the first" Chicano art studio, with Jose Luis Gonzalez and Juan Gonzalez. In 1973, he painted Dreams of Flight, one of the early murals at Estrada Courts.

In 1968, Healy earned bachelor's degrees in aerospace engineering and mathematics from Cal Poly Pomona. He went on to earn a Master's in mechanical engineering from the University of Cincinnati in 1973. He began working with Mechicano Art Center in East Los Angeles, and in 1974, painted the mural Ghosts of the Barrio at the Los Angeles housing project Ramona Gardens. He has since earned a Master's of Fine Arts from California State University, Northridge and created numerous screen prints with Self-Help Graphics & Art.

In 1975 Healy and Botello teamed to form Los Dos Streetscapers. They were soon joined by other artists such as George Yepes, Paul Botello, Rudy Calderon, Rich Raya, Ricardo Duffy, Charles Solares and Fabian Debora, which occasioned the renaming of the group to “East Los Streetscapers.” While collaborating artists have come and gone, Healy and Botello have remained the core of the group.

In 1990, Healy and Botello founded the Palmetto Gallery to provide exposure for younger artists, and East Los Streetscapers has also sponsored projects for barrio youth.

== Artworks ==
The collective used acrylic paint as the primary medium for their early murals. Later in the 1990s and 2000s they incorporated other media such as hand-painted tiles, cast bronze, and porcelain-enameled steel. Murals outside of Los Angeles include projects in San Jose, California, Santa Maria, California, Houston, Texas, St. Louis, Missouri, and Bellingham, Washington. Their work is characterized as "multicultural, strong, dynamic, colorful, site specific, and compositionally dramatic in line and texture."

In a departure from acrylic and tile murals in 2002, Wayne Healy and East Los Streetscapers installed the 12-foot tall (3.7 m) oxidized steel and dichroic glass public art sculpture Read, Reach, and Realize at the courtyard entrance to the Buena Vista Branch Library in Burbank, California.

=== Murals ===
Title	Year	Location
Chicano Time Trip	1975	2601 North Broadway, [[Lincoln Heights, Los Angeles, California|Lincoln Heights] & Daly St], exterior
Corrido de Boyle Heights	1984	5 puntos corner, 1301 Brooklyn Place, Los Angeles, CA & N Indiana St, exterior
Education Suite: Arte, Ciencia y Filosofia	1981	Helen Bailey Library at East Los Angeles College, 1301 Avenida Cesar Chavez, Monterey Park, CA 91754, interior stairway
Filling Up on Ancient Energies	1979	Shell Gas Station, Soto St. and 4th St., Boyle Heights, exterior
Gateway to Manifest Destiny	1982	Victor Clothing Company, 240 South Broadway, Los Angeles, first floor interior
Hacia Date Al Norte	1991	Outdoor Products, 3800 Mission Road, Lincoln Heights, interior of employees' cafeteria
La Sombra del Arroyo	1996	Gateway Transit Center, exterior
Life Flows at Aliso-Pico	1983	Aliso-Pico Multipurpose Center, 1505 East 1st Street, Boyle Heights, exterior
Moonscapes I-V	1979, 1987	Department of Motor Vehicles, 11400 West Washington Blvd., Culver City, exterior
El Nuevo Fuego	1985	public art mural, Victor Clothing Company, 240 South Broadway, Los Angeles, exterior
Bellingham Centennial Mural	1990	Bellingham Cider Company, 205 Prospect St, Bellingham, exterior facing Whatcom History Museum
On the Pivot Point of Life	1994	Los Angeles County Central Probation Department Juvenile Hall, 1605 Eastlake Avenue, Los Angeles, interior of chapel
Pride of Mar Vista	1988	Mar Vista Gardens Recreation Center, 11965 Allin Street, exterior
Stairway to Global Health	1991	Francisco Bravo Medical Magnet Senior High School, 1200 Cornwell Street, exterior
South Central Suite: Slauson Serenade, South Central Codex	1995	station art, station platform and street-level entrance, Slauson Metro Transit Station, 5585 Randolph St., Los Angeles; exterior
Take the Future in Your Hands	1992	Haddon Avenue School, 10115 Haddon Avenue, Pacoima, exterior
Trucha! Vital Decisions Ahead	1988	Lincoln Heights Recreation Center, 2303 Workman Street, exterior
The Claremont Stelae	2001	public art ceramic tile mural on three free-standing walls, Hughes Community Center, 1700 Danbury Rd., Claremont, exterior
Our Pico Neighborhood	2005	Virginia Avenue Park, Santa Monica, California
Magulandia in Pomona	2020	280 W 2nd St, Pomona, California

== See also ==
- Arts and Culture of Los Angeles
- Self Help Graphics & Art

== Notes ==
- Name change: "Los Dos" is Spanish for "The Two", which, once the group expanded, was no longer applicable.
