= Internal Exile (Los Illegals album) =

Studio album by Los Illegals
- Released: 1983
- Genre: Punk rock, new wave
- Label: A&M

Los Illegals chronology
Internal Exile (1983)	Concrete Blonde y Los Illegals (1997)

Internal Exile is the first album by the Los Angeles Chicano punk band Los Illegals. The songs on the album deal with issues such as immigration, poverty, street gangs, violence, and alienation. The band toured to promote the album, and began to record tracks for their second album entitled "Burning Youth." The second album was not released because of differences with their label, A&M,

== Singles ==
One single was released from the album, El Lay, in 1981. It was written by Willie Herrón and his artist friend and Gronk. It describes the trials and tribulations of a Mexican-American life in Los Angeles.

== Track listing ==
1. A1 – El Lay
2. A2 – Secret Society
3. A3 – We Don't Need A Tan
4. A4 – Guinea Pigs
5. A5 – The Maze
6. A6 – Rampage
7. B1 – Maybe
8. B2 – The Mall
9. B3 – Wake Up John
10. B4 – Search And Seizure
11. B5 – Not Another Homicide
12. B6 – A-95
