= Miguel-Angel Soria =

American poet

- Born: Tijuana, Mexico
- Occupations: Artist, activist

Miguel-Angel Soria is a Chicano community artist and activist from San Diego, California. He sometimes goes by the pen-name osokodiako.

== Early life ==
Born in Tijuana, Soria was raised a few blocks from Tijuana's Avenida Revolucion, he and his family eventually arrived on the U.S. side and settled in the San Ysidro–Nestor area of San Diego.

== Career ==
Soria was performing his poetry since the mid to late 1980s. He participated in the San Diego peace movement with the help of such groups as The Committee Opposed to Militarism and the Draft (COMD), and its Youth Activism Task Force (YATF). He penned work for journals such as The Non-Violent Activist and a number of local zines. Miguel-Angel read poetry at punk shows and at peace rallies. He was later known as a strong part of the MEChA poetry circles. He read in a number of regional, state, and eventually national MEChA conferences. He was very active in the Straight-Edge punk movement and helped organize a number of Unity Benefit concerts where acts from a different musical genres would come together.

While a student at the University of San Diego, he created an alternative poetry venue in the early 1990s to highlight the work of Xicana and Xicano artist, it was called "Noche de Atole". He always echoed the Xicana and Xicano activist of the first part of the Xicana/o movement in his belief that Xicana and Xicano poetry needed to pay tribute to its lineage. Thus, the use of the name atole. He invited many local theater, danza, music and poetry groups to the event. One highlight was the debut of a young poet then known to the world only for his journalism, Adolfo Guzman-Lopez. In addition to starting "Noche De Atole" he also proposed and founded "United Front" the University of San Diego's Multicultural student center.

Originally a participant in a poetry series called Taco Shop Poetry held at the Centro Cultural de la Raza, he formed the core of the spoken word/performance group Taco Shop Poets along with Adolfo Guzman-Lopez, Tomas Riley, and Adrian Arancibia. Soria was the group's Artistic Director, organizing rehearsals and leading their weekly meetings. Soria was also a consistent part of the TSP's line-up. He also acted as Executive Producer of Chorizo TongueFire, the TSP's first CD. Soria was a founding member of Voz Alta, a San Diego Chicana and Chicano art space.

Soria co-directed and co-produced "Chaldean Voices" an award-winning documentary with Peter Alaktib. He is currently involved in writing, directing and producing video projects such as KIOSKO!, a children's show he created. He was a member of Loko Artz Collective, a video production company based out of San Diego.
