= Concrete Blonde y Los Illegals =

Rock music album

Studio album by Concrete Blonde
- Released: May 5, 1997
- Genres: Alternative rock; hard rock; Latin music
- Label: Ark 21

Concrete Blonde chronology
Recollection: The Best of Concrete Blonde (1996)	Concrete Blonde y Los Illegals (1997)	Group Therapy (2002)

Concrete Blonde y Los Illegals is a 1997 collaborative album by American musicians Johnette Napolitano and James Mankey of Concrete Blonde, who joined forces with Los Illegals. The album contains a blend of the gothic-influenced alternative rock of Concrete Blonde and the Chicano punk of Los Illegals. The lyrics are mostly in Spanish.

== Reception ==
Los Angeles Times reviewer Enrique Lopetegui rated the album 2-½ out of 4 stars, opining that "there are plenty of good moments here" but "very few strong songs"; he singled out the "Chicano rap" record "Ode to Rosa Lopez", about a witness in the O. J. Simpson murder case, for praise as the "riskiest" track on the album. Jae-Ha Kim of the Chicago Sun-Times rated it 1-½ out of 4 stars, finding a lack of cohesion and a failure to showcase Napolitano's distinctive voice. Thom Owens of AllMusic's rating was 2-½ out of 5 stars, finding the project to be "a stylistic departure that reads better than it plays" due to weak songwriting.

== Track listing ==
1. "Caminando"
2. "Viva la Vida"
3. "La Llorona"
4. "Echoes"
5. "Despierta"
6. "Another Hundred Years of Solitude"
7. "Maria Elena (Letter from L.A.)"
8. "Ode to Rosa Lopez"
9. "Xich vs. The Migra Zombies"
10. "Deportee"
