= Salvador Güereña =

American curator and writer

Salvador Güereña is an American archivist, curator, and writer. Güereña specializes in ethnic and multicultural archives, and in digital technologies involving Chicano/Latino arts.

== Early life and education ==
Güereña and his two siblings were raised by a single mother. At age 15, he began working in the Santa Barbara Public Library as a summer job. He graduated from Santa Barbara High School.

Güereña graduated from Westmont College in 1975; he attended the school with the help of a "substantial scholarship" from the Hispanic Baptist Churches of the Pacific Southwest. While at Westmont, he co-founded Minority Student Fellowship Club. He later earned a master’s degree in library and information science from the University of Arizona.

== Career ==
After obtaining his bachelor's degree, Güereña worked in the Santa Barbara Library as a children's specialist. After earning his master's degree, he oversaw the Eastside branch of the library.

Since 1989, he has been Director of the California Ethnic and Multicultural Archives in the University of California, Santa Barbara Davidson Library.

In 2012, Güereña was elected president of the board of the Santa Barbara Education Foundation.

== Publications ==
He is a published author and editor, including several books and numerous articles in the field of library science, bibliography, and archival science. He was editor and co-author of Library Services to Latinos: an Anthology (2000), and is co-editor and co-author of Pathways to Progress: Issues and Advances in Latino Librarianship (2009).

== Personal life ==
As of 2012, Güereña lived in Santa Barbara with his wife and son.
