= Carlos Bueno (artist) =

Chicano American artist

Carlos Bueno was a draftsman, painter and muralist who helped launch the Chicano art movement in the 1970s as co-founder of Self-Help Graphics & Art.

Bueno was born in Cuernavaca, Mexico, but lived in the United States throughout the 1970s before returning to Mexico for the final years of his life. Along with his partner, the photographer Antonio Ibañez, he helped to found Los Angeles' annual Día de los Muertos/Day of the Dead celebration.

He was largely known for his drawings and while he painted a number of murals in his lifetime, only one or two survive. In April 2001, just months before his death, he had a solo exhibit at The Avenue 50 Studio in Highland Park.

He died on August 18, 2001, in Mazatlan, Mexico.
