= Self Help Graphics & Art =

Community arts center in East Los Angeles, California, United States

Coordinates: 34.0473°N 118.2267°W

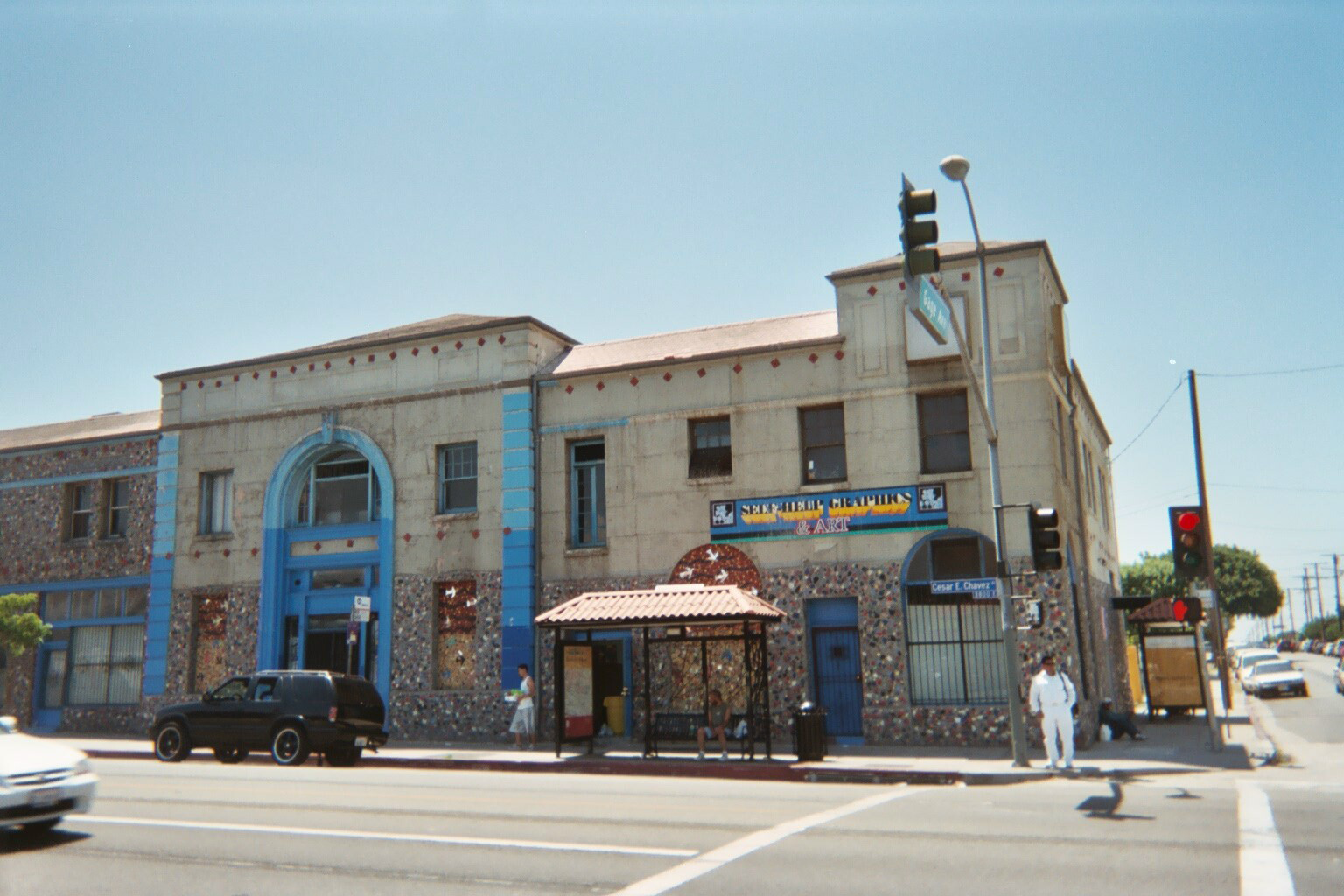
The Self-Help Graphics & Art building

Self Help Graphics & Art, Inc. is a community arts center in East Los Angeles, California, United States. Established in 1970, Self Help Graphics served as a critical locus of activity during the Chicano art movement and is a center for Chicano and Latino artistic production. SHG is most well-known for organizing annual Day of the Dead festivities, in addition to hosting exhibitions and musical performances. Throughout its history, the organization has worked with well-known artists in the Los Angeles area such as Barbara Carrasco, Los Four, the East Los Streetscapers, and Shizu Saldamando.

== History ==
In 1970, artist and Franciscan nun Karen Boccalero started producing prints in an East Los Angeles garage with Chicano artists Carlos Bueno, Antonio Ibáñez, Frank Hernández, and others. They decided to work together to promote community arts and the work of local artists, to use art as an instrument of social change in the barrio, and to establish a cultural arts center. The artists had their first exhibition the following year at an East Los Angeles shopping center called El Mercado. In 1973, the organization, which until that time went by the name Art Inc., was renamed Self Help Graphics & Art when it found a home in a suite on the third floor of an office building at 2111 Brooklyn Avenue in Boyle Heights. The 2,000 square-foot (186 m^{2}) space was financed by Order of the Sisters of St. Francis, who donated $10,000. The following year, the space was expanded to 9,000 square feet (836 m^{2}) with a grant from the Campaign for Human Development.

The first official activity of the organization was an inaugural batik and silkscreen workshop that ended with a group exhibition. Participating artists paid a small fee and provided their own materials. Thus began the Self Help tradition of instructing budding artists in graphic arts techniques. Shortly thereafter, funds provided by the California Arts Council allowed the hiring of artists Peter Tovar, Michael Amescua, Fernando Amozorrutia, Carlos Bueno, Victor Du Bois, Jeff Gates, Linda Orozco, Jesse Rays, Carla Webber, Silvia Chavez, and Linda Vallejo as arts instructors. The first Day of the Dead Celebration in the USA began in 1974 at SHG.

At first, material support for Self Help was scarce. Boccalero raised funds from Beverly Hills art enthusiasts and sought donations from art stores, museums, and Catholic organizations. In 1974, the artists realized that in order to accomplish their goal of creating a permanent home for a community arts center, they would need the support of major institutions such as the National Endowment for the Arts. Boccalero attended grant-writing workshops and hired professional administrative staff, including a bilingual office manager supplied by the American GI Forum's SER-Jobs for Progress. Between 1975 and 1983, Self Help was able to benefit from Title VI funding under the Comprehensive Employment and Training Act in a variety of capacities.

In 1979, Self Help relocated to its former location in a large building on the corner of Cesar Chavez Avenue (formerly Brooklyn Avenue) and Gage Street. The building, which is owned by the Archdiocese of Los Angeles, was previously home to the Catholic Youth Organization, which rented space for dances and meetings. Under the terms of the lease, which was renewable every ten years, Self Help was to pay one dollar per year in rent. According to cultural historian Kristen Guzmán, "From [...] correspondence involving Sister Karen and members of her community, as well as the Franciscan priests of Santa Barbara and Oakland, it is evident that the Church was vital to Self Help's existence in this period".

The former Self Help building contained a gallery, Galería Otra Vez, a printing room, office, studio space for artists-in-residence, and storage areas in two stories. Today the exterior walls of the building are adorned with embedded ceramic pieces, mosaics, and murals. The large statue of Our Lady of Guadalupe that stood in the parking lot has been relocated to the new building in Boyle Heights. The mosaic work was done by the artist Eduardo Oropeza.

Boccalero functioned as executive director until her death in 1997, at which point she was succeeded by Tomás Benítez. In May 2005, the artist Gustavo LeClerc became the center's new artistic director, and was charged with broadening Self Help's horizons. The personnel changes may have been symptoms of larger problems. Benítez stepped down in March 2005 as a financial crisis became public knowledge. On June 7, 2005, the doors of Self Help were locked and the staff was dismissed. The unforeseen nature of the closure evoked an angry reaction from the artists affiliated with the center and the community at large. A series of meetings were held to ensure that the closure was only temporary and to pre-empt any potential future problems resulting from lack of funding or the lack of organizational transparency.

Apparently, the trouble started when it was discovered that the building was in need of repairs. Numerous fundraisers were held, including a benefit concert by Ozomatli. But they were not enough to cover the repairs necessary, which raised safety issues for Self Help's workers and liability concerns for the organization. There was the additional complication of the ownership of the building, which still belonged to the Archdiocese of Los Angeles.

Most recently, news became public that Self Help had been sold by the Archdiocese of Los Angeles. The former owners, the Sisters of Saint Francis, said they asked the Archdiocese to facilitate the sale of the building. Sister Carol Snyder said it became untenable to support a venture that did not make money.

Several attempts were made by Self Help to purchase the building and were rejected by the new owners. It not being financially feasible for the not-for-profit organization to continue paying rent, it was able to secure a new space and in March 2011 moved to 1300 East First Street, Los Angeles, CA 90033. The mosaic statue of Our Lady of Guadalupe was also transported to the new location.

In April 2018 Self Help Graphics & Art acquired its headquarters in the amount of 3.625 million, located at 1300 E. 1st St. in Boyle Heights. The achievement of the organization ensured its permanence on the Eastside of LA for future generations. The building acquisition was made possible through Community Reinvestment Act (CRA) bond funds from the City of Los Angeles and its Economic and Workforce Development Office and funding from the Los Angeles County Board of Supervisors, the Weingart Foundation, lending from California Community Foundation and private donors. After years of fundraising in support of its Capital Campaign and community engagement surrounding the development of the building, the organization will embark on a cultural center renovation with details forthcoming.

== Programs ==
=== Barrio Mobile Art Studio ===
In 1974, Self Help began a program called the Barrio Mobile Art Studio (BMAS). The BMAS was a large van that was equipped with art supplies. Its mission was "to develop the individual's aesthetic appreciation, to provide an alternative mode of self-expression, and to increase the individual's appreciation of Chicano culture." On weekdays, the BMAS visited public and parochial schools and taught photography, batik, sculpture, puppetry, and filmmaking. On weekends, the van went to neighborhoods in Boyle Heights, City Terrace, and Lincoln Heights to provide art materials and training to people of all ages. Participation was encouraged even among members of street gangs, who used the materials to publish a newsletter about gang activity. The program, although phased out in 1985, served as a model for similar programs in Los Angeles and elsewhere.

=== Atelier program ===
In 1982, Self Help began an "Experimental Screenprint Atelier", a workshop in fine art serigraphy. Serigraphy was a technique that was more expensive and required greater expertise than the silkscreening. As such, it represented a departure from the Chicano sensibility of rasquachismo, or a humorous sense of pride in being able to make do with limited resources. Nonetheless, it gave artists greater latitude for individual expression, and created a higher-quality product, which resulted in greater prestige for both the artists and the center. The shift was also a means to concentrate the center's resources, which were becoming limited due to Reagan Administration-era cutbacks in social spending. The production of higher-quality works also opened up the possibility of funding Self Help activities through the sales of prints. Stephen Rose was the first master printer, Oscar Duardo the second, and José Alpuche, the third masterprinter (1979–2011).

Ateliers are held at least twice a year, and usually center around a specific theme. For example, when residents were being evicted from the Wilshire Corridor, artists produced prints accusing the city of gentrification. Other themes have included the Virgin of Guadalupe, AIDS, the 1992 Los Angeles riots, and the poet Sor Juana. Special projects are also undertaken, such as the Maestras Atelier, a workshop for female artists. The first Maestras Atelier took place in 1999 and featured artists such as Yreina Cervantez, Barbara Carrasco and Laura E. Alvarez.

=== Chicano Expressions ===
"Chicano Expressions" was an internationally touring exhibit funded by the United States Information Agency to "provide exposure to American values and culture". The exhibit, which featured work from 20 artists, toured South Africa, Colombia, Honduras, Germany, France, and Spain in 1993. Boccalero found funding to allow some of the artists and Self Help staff to travel with the exhibition, which fostered networking between artists from the countries visited.

Self Help Graphics & Art was invited to Glasgow, Scotland, by the artists of the Glasgow Print Studio in October 1996 to collaborate on Day of the Dead workshops and celebrations there.

== Day of the Dead ==
The revival of the indigenous holiday Día de los Muertos was part of the Mexican-American reclamation of indigenous identity, an important social aspect of the Chicano Movement. Self Help played an integral role in the holiday's revival in California. The first celebration was in 1974, and by 1978 it had become an event requiring $14,000 in funding. Today, the Day of the Dead is one of Los Angeles's major celebrations, and receives funding from the National Endowment for the Humanities, among other sources.

"In 1973, SHG, along with the Chicano art collectives Asco and Los Four, initiated the Chicano Día de los Muertos. The procession of mostly elementary and college students began with a Catholic mass in Evergreen Cemetery and ended at SHG’s location on Brooklyn Avenue, where participants laid marigolds on an altar commemorating the dead." Preparation generally begins in August with papel picado-making, altar-making, and printmaking workshops for children and adults. On November 1, participants, many of whom paint their faces as calaveras, proceed down Cesar Chavez to Evergreen Cemetery, where personal and family altars are set up and food is (pan de muerto) offered to the deceased family members there interred. Sometimes a mass is celebrated there. Then attendees return to Self Help, where altars, ofrendas, prints, and other works are exhibited. Often there are musical and theatrical performances, like Luis Valdez's Teatro Campesino performed El Fin del Mundo as part of the program in 1978.

The event has not only been the occasion to, as a promotional brochure explains, "learn about the important role that heritage and tradition play in defining who we are", but has also been used to make artistic and political statements. In 1974, the Chicano conceptual and performance art group Asco took advantage of the opportunity to confront a by-then entrenched social and political culture with an irreverent "invasion". In the midst of ceremonies attended by Los Angeles's political elite, Harry Gamboa Jr., Patssi Valdez, Gronk, and Willie Herrón were "delivered" in a giant envelope marked postage due. They emerged in wild costumes, acting out their "absurdist message". The piece was a challenge to Self Help's orthodox interpretation of the holiday. According to Gronk, "We were originally asked to come in to do a piece." But after being shown a film about Mexico's Day of the Dead, "we sort of rolled our eyes like, 'Are we gonna repeat that?' Just like, 'That's fine for somewhere else, but not for us.' Day of the Dead can mean a lot of different of things, and it doesn't necessarily mean paper cutouts, skull heads. We can invent it, what it means to us."

The Day of the Dead has taken a political bent when used to mourn those who have died from the political violence. As such, it has occasionally been used as a vehicle to artistically criticize the policies of the United States, especially as they affect the Latino community. Altars to honor the victims of the Iraq War that incorporate text or images highlighting the high casualty rate among Latino soldiers are an example of such.

In 2000, the Mexican Museum in San Francisco dedicated its exhibition "Chicanos en Mictlán: Día de los Muertos en California" to Day of the Dead celebrations at Self Help and San Francisco's Galería de la Raza.

In 2009 the Day of the Dead Celebration had grown too large to be held in the Self Help parking lot. The celebration was moved to its current location at East Los Angeles Civic Center on 3rd Street and Mednik Avenue.

October 9th to November 24th 2021 Self Help Graphics and Art had their 48th Dia de Los Muertos Exhibition, Everything is Connected: Land, Body, and Cosmos which included eighteen artists, visual and sound. The exhibition was curated by Miyo Stevens-Gandara, an artist who also contributes to programs in Self Help Graphics. Evergreen (2021) is a silkscreen print by Stevens-Gandara which was placed into the exhibition which has a connection to the artist. "This cemetery is significant to me personally because I have an aunt buried there in the Japanese section of the cemetery. It's also really significant to Self Help Graphics because it is the location for a lot of the early celebrations for Día de Los Muertos, and I wanted to kind of touch on those connections. It's significant to the area of Boyle Heights as an ever-changing neighborhood. It's the largest non-denominational cemetery in Los Angeles, and one of the oldest, so I thought it was a nice way to represent all these ideas that I've been thinking about in an image, in a location." Stevens-Gandara says this in her interview by Jennifer Cuevas and Amanda Gomez, which was recorded October 9, 2021. Evergreen can be seen in Self Help Graphics at Fifty: A Cornerstone of Latinx Art and Collaborative Artmaking(2023) where it is explained as a piece for celebrating Dia de los Muertos every year. On the Self Help Graphics website the exhibition an be viewed today virtually.

== In the News ==
- September 2017 – In response to the Trump Administration’s announcement that it plans to repeal DACA, Self-Help Graphics & Art partners with the National Day Laborer Organization Network to produce and distribute posters advising Mexican immigrants on how to respond if confronted by immigration authorities.
- April 2018 – Self Help Graphics & Art acquired its headquarters in the amount of 3.625 million, located at 1300 E. 1st St. in Boyle Heights. The landmark achievement of the organization ensured its permanence on the Eastside of LA for future generations. The building acquisition was made possible through Community Reinvestment Act (CRA) bond funds from the City of Los Angeles and its Economic and Workforce Development Office and funding from the Los Angeles County Board of Supervisors, the Weingart Foundation, lending from California Community Foundation and private donors.
- September 2020 – Latinx Arts Alliance non-profit is launched consisting of Self-Help Graphics & Art and four other prominent greater Los Angeles area arts organizations: LA Plaza, Museum of Latin American Art, the Vincent Price Art Museum, and the Social and Public Art Resource Center with a mission to facilitate equal representation for the Latino arts community at the local and national level.
- June 2021 – Self Help Graphics & Art announced a one million dollar donation by philanthropist MacKenzie Scott. Within two weeks of this news, the nonprofit organization announced California State funding in the amount of four million dollars, toward the renovation of its 1300 E. 1st St. Boyle Heights building.
- April 2022 – After years of fundraising in support of its Capital Campaign and community engagement surrounding the development of its 1300 E. 1st St. building, the organization will embark on a cultural center renovation with details forthcoming.

== Bibliography ==
- Güereña, Salvador (c. 1985). "Self Help Graphics & Art Organizational History". Guide to the Self Help Graphics Archives 1960 - 1992.
- Guzmán, Kristen (2005). Self Help Graphics & Art: Art in the Heart of East Los Angeles. Edited by Colin Gunckel. Los Angeles: University of California, Los Angeles. ISBN 978-0-89551-100-3.
- Hernandez, Daniel (August 4, 2004). "Self Help Graphics & Art". Los Angeles Times.
- Romo, Tere (2000). Chicanos en Mictlán: Día de los Muertos en California. San Francisco: Mexican Museum.
- Mark Vallen (2005). "Self Help Graphics Finished?". Art for a Change.
- "State of California Department Of Parks And Recreation Primary Record" (PDF). June 2010.
