= List of progressive house artists =

This is a list of progressive house artists. This list does not include little-known local artists or big room house DJ and producers. See big room house for notable DJs and producers such as Hardwell, Martin Garrix, and Swedish House Mafia.

== A ==
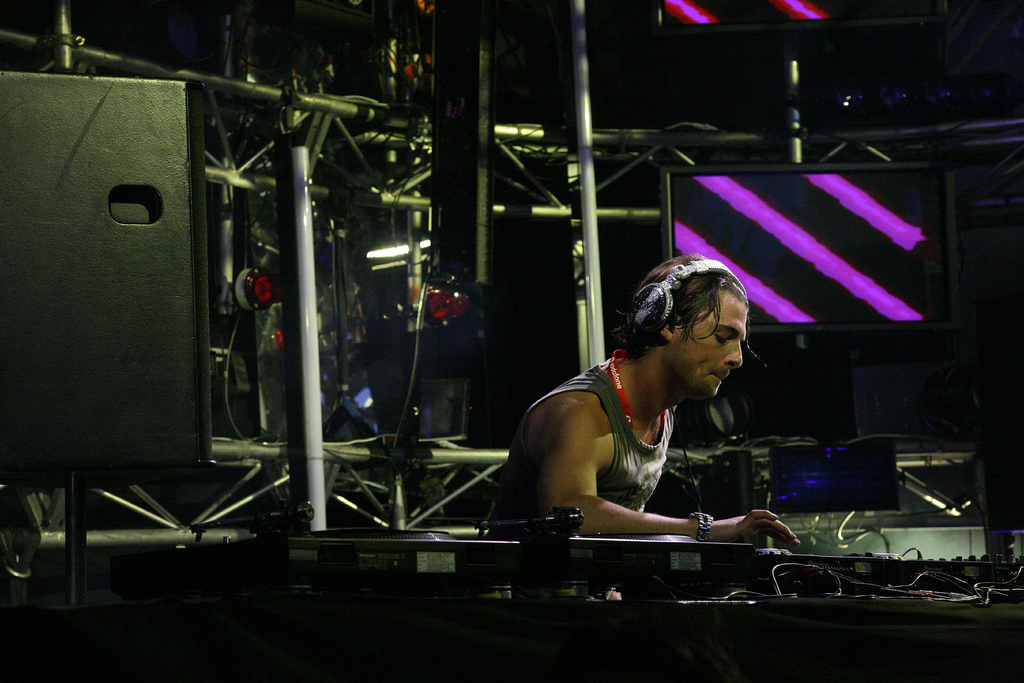
Axwell, 2012

- Adam K & Soha
- Afrojack
- Alesso
- Anthony Pappa
- Armin van Buuren
- Arno Cost
- Arty (also released as Alpha 9)
- ATB
- Audien
- Avicii
- Axwell

== B ==
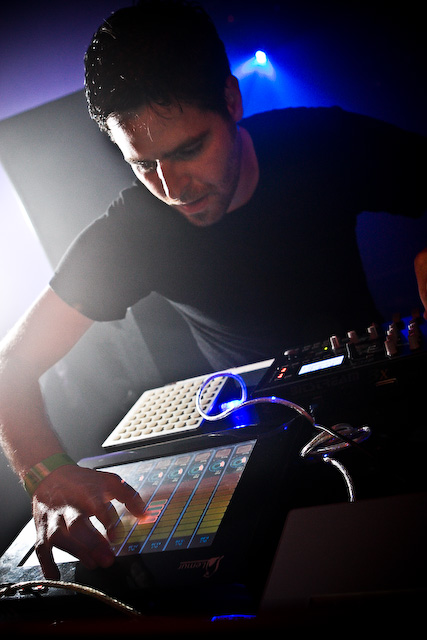
Gui Boratto, 2008

- Bassjackers
- Bellatrax
- Benny Benassi
- Blasterjaxx
- Boom Jinx
- Brainbug

== C ==
- Calvin Harris
- Cash Cash
- Chicane

== D ==
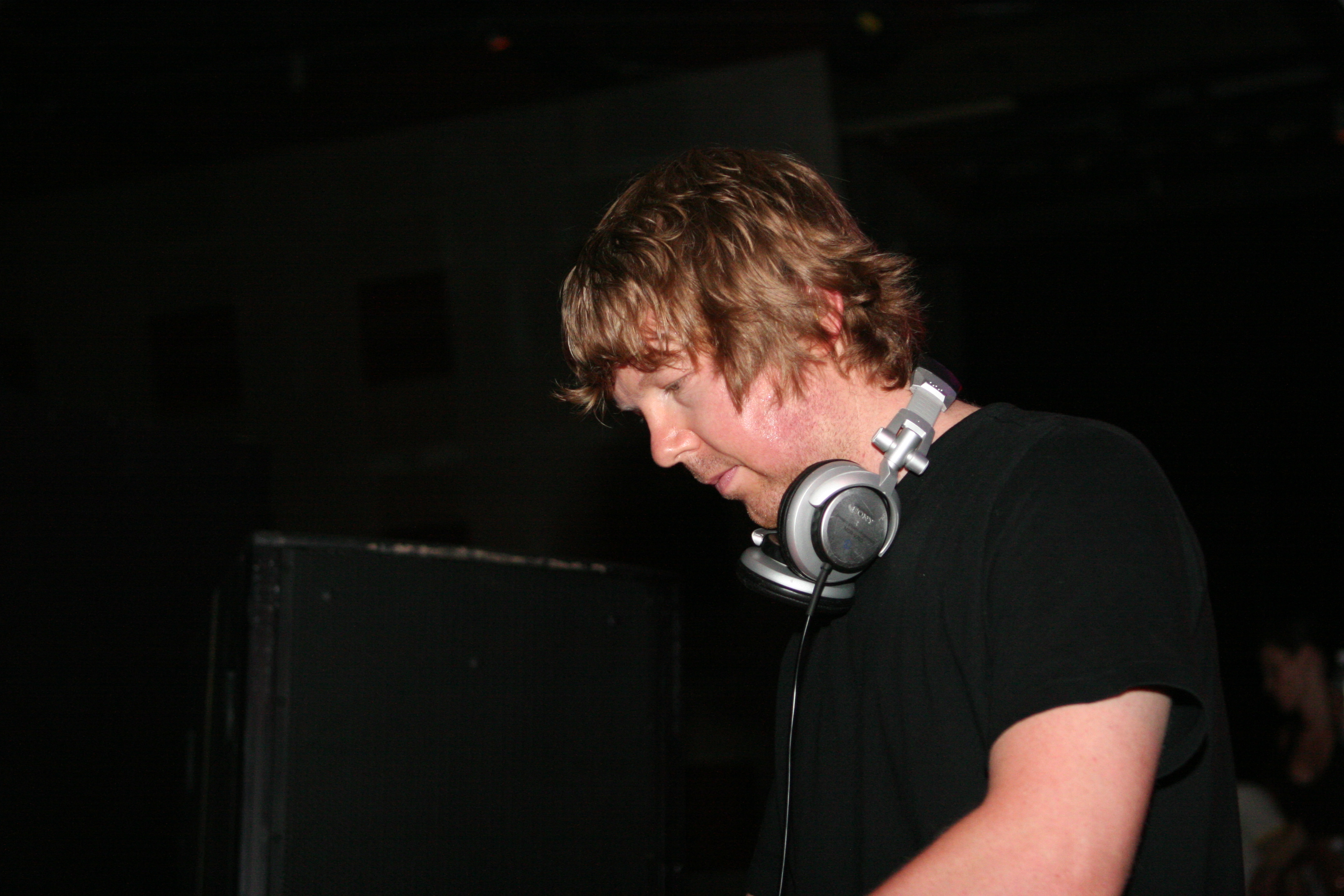
John Digweed, 2006

- Dada Life
- Daddy's Groove
- Dannic
- Danny Howells
- Danny Tenaglia
- Darin Epsilon
- Darren Emerson
- Darude
- Dash Berlin
- David Guetta
- Deadmau5
- Deep Dish
- Deepsky
- Deniz Koyu
- Dinka
- Dirty South
- DJ Tatana
- Dosem
- Drum Club
- Dubfire
- DubVision
- Dyro
- Dzeko
- Dzeko & Torres

== E ==
- EDX
- Eelke Kleijn
- Eric Prydz (also released as Pryda)
- Erick Morillo

== F ==
- Faithless
- Fedde le Grand
- Feenixpawl
- Firebeatz
- First State
- Florian Picasso
- Fluke
- Fonzerelli
- Frank Walker

== G ==
- Gabriel & Dresden
- Gat Decor
- Groove Armada
- Grum
- Gui Boratto
- Guy Gerber
- Guy J
- Guy Mantzur

== H ==
- Hard Rock Sofa
- Hardwell
- Headhunterz
- Hernán Cattáneo
- Hot Since 82
- Hybrid

== J ==
- James Holden
- Jason Jollins
- Jaytech
- Jeremy Olander
- Jody Wisternoff (also released as Way Out West)
- John Dahlbäck
- John de Sohn
- John Digweed

== K ==
- Kaskade
- Khen
- Kingkade
- Krewella
- KSHMR
- Kygo
- Kyotto

== L ==
- Lane 8
- Leftfield
- Lucas & Steve

== M ==
- Maestro Harrell
- Manse
- Mario Ochoa
- Marshmello
- Martin Garrix
- Mat Zo
- Matisse & Sadko
- Matt Darey
- Matt Fax
- Max Graham
- Michael Brun
- Michael Calfan
- Michael Mind Project
- Michael Woods
- Mike Candys
- Mike Dierickx
- Minilogue
- Mixmaster Morris
- Moby
- Moonbeam
- Morgan Page
- Moti

== N ==
- NajaWien
- Nathan Fake
- Nick Warren (also released as Way Out West)
- Nicky Romero

== O ==
- Opus III
- Orbital
- Otto Knows

== P ==
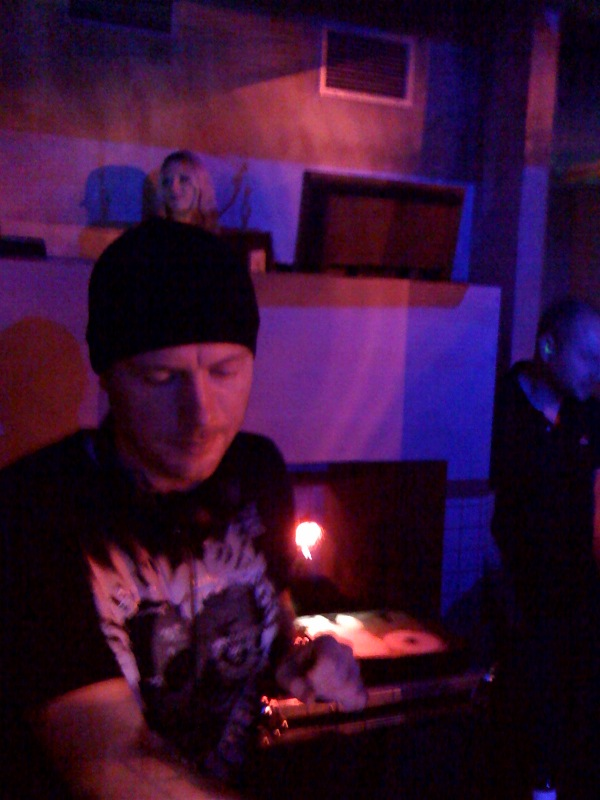
Eric Prydz, 2008

- Paolo Mojo
- Paris & Simo
- Pole Folder
- Porter Robinson
- Project 46

== Q ==
- Quivver

== R ==
- Randy Bettis
- Robert Babicz
- Roger Sanchez
- Roy Rosenfeld
- Ryos

== S ==
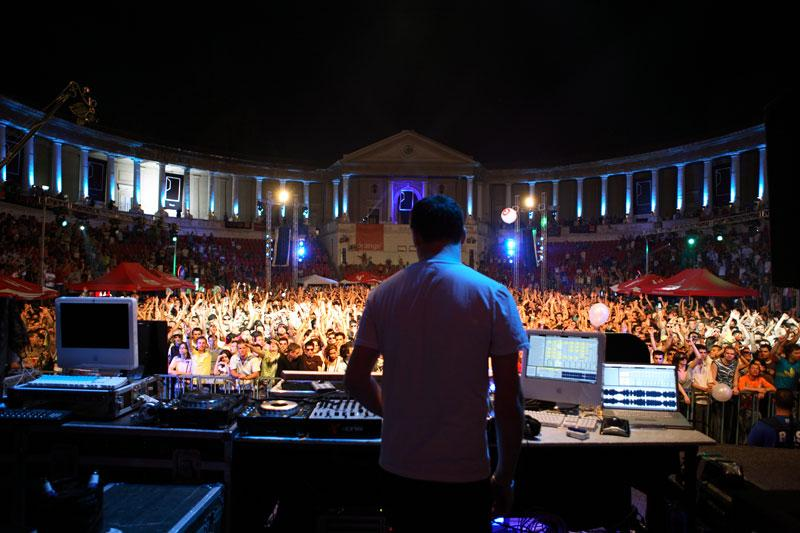
Sasha, 2006

- Sahar Z
- Sander Kleinenberg
- Sander van Doorn
- Sash!
- Sasha
- Satoshi Tomiie
- Seb Fontaine
- Sebastian Ingrosso
- Shapov
- Sick Individuals
- Spooky
- Stadiumx
- Steve Angello
- Steve Lawler
- Steve Porter
- Sunscreem
- Swanky Tunes
- Swedish House Mafia
- System 7

== T ==
- Ten Walls
- The Chainsmokers
- TheFatRat
- The Presets
- Third Party
- Tiësto
- Tilt
- Tom Swoon
- Tomcraft
- Trancesetters
- Tritonal

== U ==
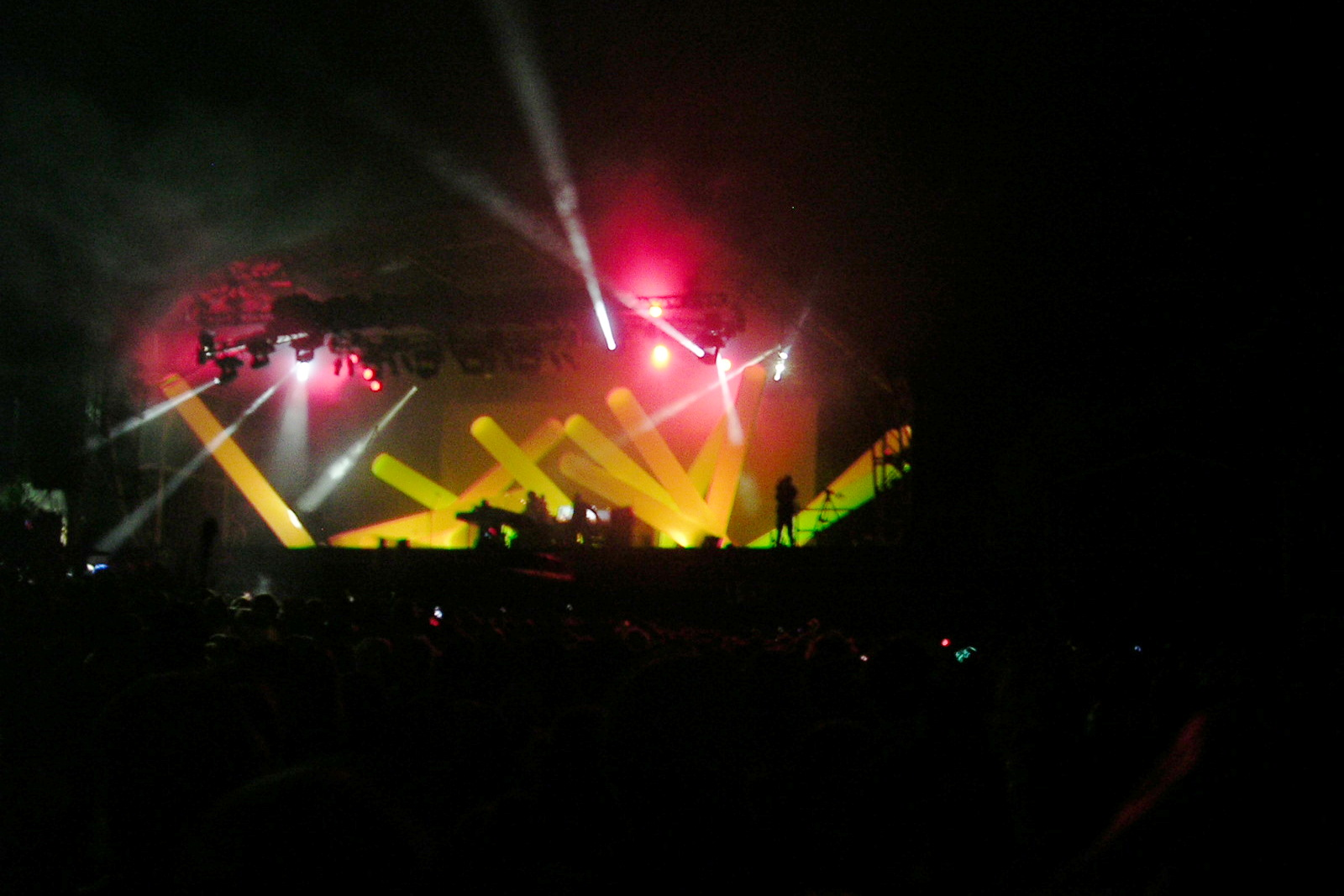
Underworld live, 2008

- Ummet Ozcan
- Underworld

== V ==
- Vibrasphere
- Vicetone

== W ==
- W&W (released as Manuputty)
- William Orbit

== Z ==
- Zedd
- Zight

== See also ==
- List of deep house music artists
- List of house music artists
- List of electro house artists
- List of electronic music genres
- List of electronic music festivals
- List of electronic music record labels
- List of club DJs
- List of tropical house music artists
