= Jeremy Olander =

- Olander in March 2013

Background information
- Also known as: Dhillon
- Born: Jeremy Bertil Ölander; 15 October 1987 (age 38)
- Origin: Fairfax, Virginia, U.S.
- Genres: House, techno, progressive house, tech house
- Occupations: Musician, producer, disc jockey
- Years active: 2009–present
- Labels: Vivrant, Diynamic, Last Night On Earth, Bedrock, Anjunadeep, Get Physical, Pryda Recordings, Pryda Friends, Drumcode
- Website: www.jeremyolander.com

Jeremy Olander (born 15 October 1987) is a Swedish DJ and producer based in Stockholm, Sweden. He was born in Fairfax, Virginia, United States and relocated to Stockholm at an early age. His style of electronic dance music has been described as a cross between an authentic brand of progressive house and melodic house music and techno.

== Career ==
In 2011 Olander became the first artist to sign an agreement for multiple releases on Pryda Friends, a label founded by one of his main musical inspirations; Swedish DJ and producer Eric Prydz. To date, Olander has had 6 releases on Pryda Friends that have come to be some of the label's biggest sellers. His most successful outing on Pryda Friends was "Let Me Feel", a single released in 2013 that peaked at number 10 on the overall Beatport Top 100 chart.

In 2014 Olander became the first artist to sign an agreement for multiple releases on Pryda Recordings. His inaugural EP on the label became the first from an artist other than Eric Prydz. The EP, consisting of lead track "Jackie" together with "Lauderdale" and "DLIGTY", went to number 1 on the overall Beatport Top 100 releases chart and ousted Aphex Twin from the top spot. It stayed at number 1 for 10 days.

He has produced a number of remixes for other artists both in and outside of the electronic dance music space, including Tove Lo, Sailor & I, Dosem, Mendoza, Digitalism, Golden Girls, The Good Guys, Glenn Morrison, 16 Bit Lolitas, Adrian Lux and Henry Saiz.

Olander employs an alias called Dhillon for a certain style of his music. It is described as darker and deeper underground Techno. His most successful releases as Dhillon have been put out on Drumcode Records founded by Swedish DJ and producer Adam Beyer. In 2014 Olander played his first show as Dhillon at Sound Nightclub in Los Angeles, California.

In 2014, Olander performed at the EPIC 3.0 show at Madison Square Garden put on by Eric Prydz. The show incorporated a 20m, 4K hologram and 32 lasers.

On November 30, 2015, Olander, along with his manager Alexander Drewniak, launched his own label, Vivrant. The first release featured the long desired Taiga and Roots, as well as Pinkerton from Olander Essential Mix with Prydz and the previously unheard Falls.

In late October 2016, he brought back the Vivrant party to his hometown with a lineup containing acts such as Henry Saiz, Finnebassen and Sweden native Charlie Don’t Surf. The sold out show was held at Nobelberget, a 1200 cap venue just outside Stockholm.

Jeremy was nominated for Beatport Progressive House Artist of the Year in 2016.

In May 2017, Olander hit a milestone in his career by releasing on John Digweed's well known imprint Bedrock Records. "Last Dance" produced together with Cristoph was Olander's first ever collab project, and stayed as number 1 for 10 days on the Beatport Progressive House chart and peaked at 29 on the overall chart. ”It’s definitely a dream come true”, Olander said about releasing on the label.

Olander gave back to his supporters with a free event called ”Vivrant Open” in June 2017, where he played for eight hours, making it his longest set to date. The event was an open air at Amfiteatern in Långholmen and over 2000 people attended the event.

Adding to his list of breakthroughs in 2017, Jeremy also got the chance to do his first residency at Sound Nightclub in Los Angeles. Previous Sound residents include Guy Gerber, Pete Tong and Marco Carola.

Olander had his first label showcase at the yearly Amsterdam Dance Event in October 2017. Olander brought names like Marino Canal, Guy Mantzur, Khen, Tim Engelhardt and Ejeca with him, making the show one of the highlights of the year for the swede.

In late 2017 Olander debuted on Anjunadeep with his "Crossed" EP, which was released on December 8. Continuing his impressive run on Beatport, the EP peaked at number 2 on the overall release chart and earned the number 1 spot on the progressive house release chart.

At the time of this writing, Olander has released 6 original releases on his imprint Vivrant under various production aliases. Four releases made it to number 1 on the Beatport Progressive House Top 100 releases chart. Olander has also put out two back to back EPs under his moniker Dhillon on Vivrant. They also made it to number 1 on the Beatport Top 100 Techno releases chart.

Olander is signed to American music publisher Warner/Chappell Music.

== Discography (as Jeremy Olander) ==
=== EPs ===
- "Rubicks / Summit / The Mist" (2020) [Vivrant]
- "Saigon / Nattuggla" (2020) [Vivrant]
- "Kailash / Southbound" (2019) [Get Physical]
- "Docks / Brando" (2019) [Vivrant]
- "Leftwoods / Passagen" (2018) [Last Night on Earth]
- "Karusell / Andköln" (2018) [Vivrant]
- "Crossed / Araoz" (2017) [Anjunadeep]
- "Gattaca / Gaansvoort / Galheera" (2017) [Vivrant]
- "Last Dance / Dimensions" (2017) [Bedrock] (with Cristoph)
- "Damon / Billinghurst" (2017) [Vivrant]
- "Caravelle / Atlanten / Shuttle" (2016) [Vivrant]
- "Talespin / Panorama" (2016) [Suara]
- "Taiga / Pinkerton / Roots / Falls" (2015) [Vivrant]
- "Hanover / Lunar / Exchange" (2015) [Suara]
- "Goliath / Goliath (Marc Marzenit Remix) / Bayhert / Groover" (2015) [microCastle]
- "Jackie / DLIGTY / Lauderdale" (2014) [Pryda Recordings]
- "Rorschach / The Rose Law" (2013) [Cr2 Records]
- "Fairfax / Rypamont" (2011) [Pryda Friends]
- "Evade / Riots / Chronic" (2011) [Pryda Friends]
- "Airsteala / Dirty South Remix" (2011) [Phazing]
- "Tanja's Umbala / Screena" (2011) [Spinnin' Deep]
- "Funkoff / Interstate" (2010) [Kingdom Kome Cuts]
- "Suns / Ganza" (2010) [Spinnin' Deep]
- "Spearshake / Frontline" (2010) [Oxygen Recordings]
- "Bladerunner / Matheus Komar Remix" (2009) [Nellie Recordings]
- "Pressure / Marzetti Remix Remix" (2009) [Sovereign House Records]

=== Singles ===
- "Depot" (2021) [Vivrant]
- "Sagan" (2021) [Vivrant]
- "Steps" (2020) [Vivrant]
- "Vanadis" (2019) [Vivrant]
- "Shogun" (2019) [Vivrant]
- "Zanzibar - Sthlm Edit" (2018) [Vivrant]
- "Bandersnatch" (2013) [Pryda Friends]
- "Petroleum" (2013) [Pryda Friends]
- "Let Me Feel" (2013) [Pryda Friends]
- "Norrsken" (2012) [Toolroom]
- "Astro" (2010) [JOOF]
- "Mary" (2010) [Oxygen Recordings]

=== Remixes ===
- Tove Lo - "Sweettalk my Heart" (2019) [Universal]
- Sailor & I x Eekkoo - "Letters" (2016) [Big Beat/Atlantic]
- Dosem - "Runnerpark" (2015) [Suara]
- Mendoza - "Love Druggie" (2014) [Universal]
- Henry Saiz - "Afraid" (2014) [Natura Sonoris]
- Golden Girls - "Kinetic" (2013) [Floorplay Music]
- 16 Bit Lolitas - "Chant a Tune" (2013) [Bits n Pieces]
- Adrian Lux - "Fire" (2012) [Ultra]
- Glenn Morrison - "Mine & Yours" (2012) [Morrison Recordings]
- Digitalism - "Circles" (2011) [Pryda Friends]
- The Good Guys - "Get Freaky" (with Andre Cabrera) (2009) [Housesession Records]

=== Compilations ===
- Factures (2013) [Sudbeat]
- Norrsken (2012) [Toolroom]

=== Mix albums ===
- Balance presents Vivrant (2019) [Balance]

== Discography (as Dhillon) ==
=== EPs ===
- "The Heist EP" (Vivrants / Bullies / The Heist) (2016) [Vivrant]
- "Intro EP" (Intro / Umbra / Black Widoe) (2016) [Vivrant]
- "Firefly Delta / Dr Krauss" (2011) [Spinnin' Deep]

=== Singles ===
- "Xenon" (2024) [Vivrant]
- "Lost" (2014) [Drumcode]
- "Layerleaf" (2012) [Drumcode]
