= Sun City Music Festival =

Music festival in El Paso, Texas

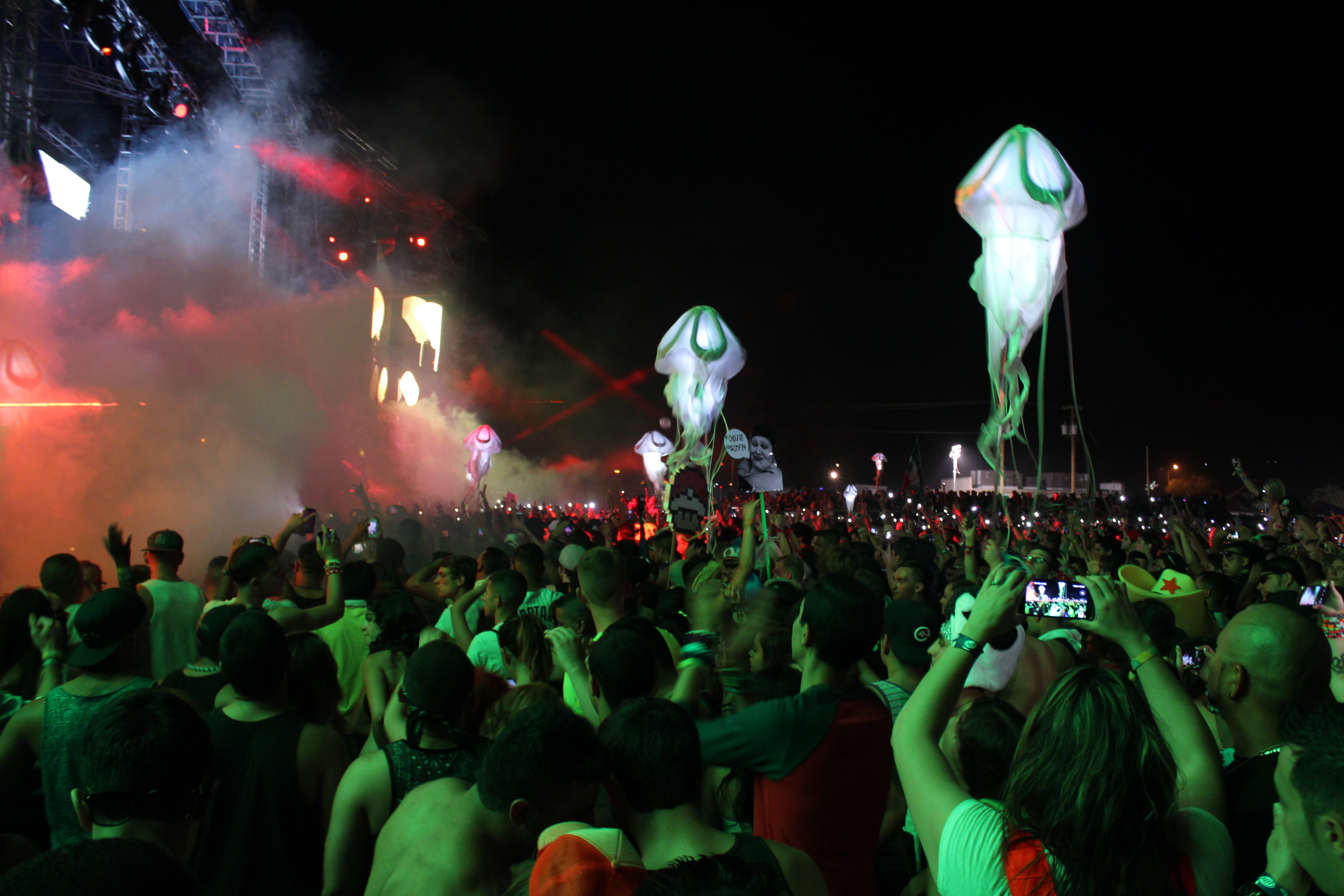
- SCMF 2014.
- Dates: Labor Day Weekend
- Locations: El Paso, TX, United States
- Years active: 2011–2017
- Founders: SMG Events Disco Donnie Presents
- Website: www.suncitymusicfestival.com

Sun City Music Festival was an annual electronic music festival held over Labor Day weekend in El Paso, Texas at Ascarate Park. In its opening year, the festival was held at Cohen Stadium. The festival represents all genres of electronic music, bringing top international DJs and live acts from multiple countries along with local producers and radio personalities to three stages, one of them being the Beatport Stage. The festival was founded by SMG Events and Disco Donnie Presents. On May 9, 2018, it was announced through the Sun City Music Festival Twitter account that the festival would not be happening.

== History ==
=== 2011–2017 ===
In its inaugural year in 2011, an estimated 20,000 people attended to see artists Armin van Buuren, Afrojack, Wolfgang Gartner, Martin Solveig, and many others. In 2012, SCMF, as it is commonly known by attendees, moved to Ascarate Park. It has remained at Ascarate Park until its last occurrence in 2017.

=== Since 2018: Hiatus ===
In May 2018, it was announced that Sun City Music Festival would not be held but that there were hopes of coming back in 2019. There was never a reason cited for why the festival was canceled, with SCMF's announcement only saying, "...the Disco and SMG teams work diligently to ensure every single time you enter the gates of Sun City Music Festival, the best possible experience awaits you. Throughout the calendar year, the SCMF team works extremely hard to meet this momentous task with rigorous standards in place. Unfortunately, we don’t believe that goal can be accomplished in 2018." As of August 2020, the last update on the festival was by Disco Donnie stating: "*SCMF - its [sic] complicated *Starting A New Festival During a Pandemic - its [sic] complicated... Ascarate was nice enough to move my deposit and dates to 2021. Buts [sic] its [sic] still going to be complicated."

== 2011 Lineup ==
- Afrojack
- Ambivalent
- Andy C & MC GQ
- Armin Van Buuren
- Chris Lake
- Chuckie
- Cookie Monsta
- Cosmic Gate
- Crystal Castles
- Dusty Kid
- Exceed
- Feed Me
- Funkagenda
- Gabriel & Dresden
- High Contrast
- Joachim Garraud
- LA Riots (DJ)
- Martin Solveig
- Nero
- Paul Van Dyk
- Sander Van Doorn
- Sidney Samson
- Showtek
- Sunnery James & Ryan Marciano
- Sub Focus
- Wolfgang Gartner
- Zedd

== 2012 Lineup ==
- David Guetta
- Zedd
- Flux Pavilion
- Knife Party
- Dada Life
- Above & Beyond
- Nicky Romero
- Dillon Francis
- Sander van Doorn
- Modestep
- John Dahlback
- Kill The Noise
- Morgan Page
- Gesaffelstein
- Downlink
- Joris Voorn
- Dirtyphonics
- Umek
- Brodinski
- Riva Starr
- M.A.N.D.Y
- Alvin Risk
- Crizzly
- Stefano Noferini
- Lucky Date
- Destructo
- Revolvr
- Audrey Napoleon
- Dirty Audio
- Gina Turner
- Kevin Focus
- Funk Agenda
- Nick Fanciulli

== 2013 Lineup ==
- Armin van Buuren
- Tiesto
- Steve Aoki
- Alesso
- Adventure Club
- Baauer
- Borgore
- Brodinski
- Candyland
- Cassy
- Crizzly
- Danny Avila
- Deniz Koyu
- Deorro
- Dillon Francis
- Dimitri Vegas & Like Mike
- Droog
- Eats Everything
- Flosstradamus
- French Fries (DJ)
- Gesaffelstein
- GTA
- John Digweed
- Just Blaze
- Kill Paris
- Le Castle Vania
- Markus Schulz
- Ookay
- Scuba
- Sebastien Leger
- Seven Lions
- Stefano Noferini
- TJR
- Zomboy

== 2014 Lineup ==
- Tiesto
- Martin Garrix
- David Guetta
- Above & Beyond
- Carnage
- Showtek
- W&W
- Aly & Fila
- Amin Edge & Dance
- Andrew Rayel
- Bryan Kearney
- Candyland
- Cash Cash
- Chris Lake
- Cosmic Gate
- Deorro
- Dubfire
- Headhunterz
- Hobo
- Hot Since 82
- Loco Dice
- Luminox
- M4SONIC
- Nicole Moudaber
- Ookay
- Orjan Nilsen
- Otto Knows
- Party Favor
- Paul van Dyk
- Sian
- Slander
- Spektre
- TJR
- Thomas Newson
- Zomboy

== 2015 Lineup ==
On May 20, 2015, it was reported that the lineup would consist of house, techno, trance, electro house, and other genres.

- Armin van Buuren
- Hardwell
- Adam Beyer
- Audien
- Borgore
- Borgeous
- Cashmere Cat
- Chris Liebing
- Dash Berlin
- Dubfire (Live)
- DVBBS
- Hot Since 82
- GTA
- NERVO
- Odesza
- Robin Schulz
- TJR
- Yellow Claw
- Zeds Dead
- Bixel Boys
- Botnek
- Brillz
- Claptone
- Coone
- Destructo
- Galantis
- Felix Cartal
- Jack Bass
- Jauz
- Kayzo
- Ida Engberg
- Lane 8
- Liquid Todd
- Morten
- Flower and The Snake
- Hector
- Oliver Dollar
- Riot Ten
- Shiba San
- Slander
- Trippy Turtle

== 2016 Lineup ==
- Skrillex
- Kaskade
- The Chainsmokers
- Galantis
- Andrew Bayer
- Bro Safari
- Cash Cash
- Fedde Le Grand
- Gareth Emery
- Ghastly
- Ilan Bluestone
- Jauz
- Joris Voorn
- Loco Dice
- Malaa
- Marshmello
- Nghtmre
- Sam Feldt
- Sasha
- Seven Lions
- Snails
- SNBRN
- Wiwek
- Zomboy
- 4B
- ANNA
- Boombox Cartel
- Butch
- CID
- Gardens of God
- Jeremy Olander
- Josh Wink
- Lee K
- Lny Tnz
- Matador
- Mind Against
- Pleasurekraft
- Tigerlily
- Unlike Pluto

== 2017 Lineup ==
- Marshmello
- Above & Beyond
- Borgore
- Dirty South
- Don Diablo
- Dosem
- Drezo
- Getter
- G Jones
- Guy J
- Guy Mantzur
- Herobust
- Illenium
- Joyryde
- Latmun
- Louis the Child
- Malaa
- NGHTMRE
- Nicole Moudaber
- Ookay
- REZZ
- Sam Paganini
- SAYMYNAME
- Seven Lions
- Shaun Frank
- SLUSHII
- Snails
- Steve Lawler
- Tchami
- Timmy Trumpet
- Wax Motif
- Sasha & John Digweed

== See also ==
- List of electronic music festivals
