= Perspectives Digital =

Record label

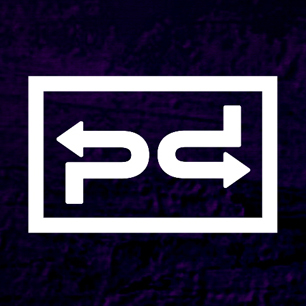
- Founded: November 2010
- Founder: Darin Epsilon
- Genre: Deep house; Progressive house; Tech House; Techno; EDM; House
- Country of origin: U.S.
- Location: Los Angeles, California
- Official website: www.perspectivesdigital.com

Perspectives Digital is a record label for Deep House, Tech House, Progressive House, and Techno. Based out of Los Angeles and founded in 2010 by Darin Epsilon, the imprint is an extension of his popular radio show of the same name. In summer of 2017, DJ Mag nominated Perspectives for 'Breakthrough Label' in their first ever Best of North America Awards.

Epsilon's list of producers includes Armen Miran, Betoko, Chris Fortier, Cid Inc, Danito & Athina, Einmusik, Galestian, Hernan Cattaneo & Soundexile, Ian O'Donovan, Jamie Stevens, John Graham, Lexicon Avenue, Nick Muir (Bedrock with John Digweed), Martin Roth, Petar Dundov, Robert Babicz, Sebastien Leger, and Wally Lopez.

Perspectives is involved with various projects that contribute to its success. Music licensing, live events, and remix competitions have assisted in growing the label and expanding the fanbase. Global brands that have licensed their tracks include: American DJ, Armada Music, Bedrock Records, Black Hole Recordings, Elation Lighting, Global Underground, Guess (clothing), Ministry of Sound, Perfecto Records, and Toolroom.

Record label showcases are organized by the label and held during events such as Amsterdam Dance Event and Miami Winter Music Conference. The ADE and WMC Samplers offered by the label are compilations that reflect the artists and tracks featured at these events.

In 2015, Perspectives partnered with Beatport Play to organize a remix competition 'Outliers' by Darin Epsilon and Cid Inc., Michael & Levan, and Stiven Rivic vs. Rick Pier O'Neil were named the Grand Prize winners with Subandrio, SummerMarian, and Solid Stone as the runners-up. The Community Pick winner was awarded to Las Vegas-based producer Nathan Clement.

Perspectives teamed up with Sonic Academy in June 2017 for a remix competition of Epsilon's 'One Thousand and One Nights'. Epsilon provided Sonic Academy detailed videos explaining how the track was made, later giving the contestants an opportunity to download the project file and stems. Even though this was the first time any website created a tutorial dedicated to producing classic Progressive House, Sonic Academy received a record number of submissions with Paul Kardos, Ejaz Ahamed, and Magnetic Brothers being named the winners.

The record label has gained support from several leading DJ/Producers in the industry. Since its inception, Perspectives tracks have gained regular support from (alphabetical): Above & Beyond, Armin Van Buuren, Danny Howells, Dave Seaman, DJ Mag, Guy J, Hernan Cattaneo, James Zabiela, John Digweed, Laurent Garnier, Markus Schulz, Max Graham, Nick Warren, Paul Oakenfold, Sasha, and Solomun.
