= Komm zu mir =

Single by Unheilig
- Released: 7 May 2001
- Genre: Neue Deutsche Härte
- Length: 12:18
- Label: Bloodline
- Producer: José Alvarez-Brill

Unheilig singles chronology
"'Sage Ja!'" (2000)	"Komm zu mir" (2001)	"'Maschine'" (2003)

Komm zu mir (German for Come to me) is the second single by the Neue Deutsche Härte band Unheilig, taken from the group's debut album Phosphor.

== Track listing ==
No.	Title	English Translation	Length
1.	"Komm zu mir (Radio Edit)"	Come to me (Radio Edit)	3:14
2.	"Die Macht (Remix)"	The Power (Remix)	5:46
3.	"Willenlos (Schwarze Witwe Remix)"	Will-less (Schwarze Witwe Remix)	3:18
