= Bloodletting (The Vampire Song) =

1990 single by Concrete Blonde

Single by Concrete Blonde

from the album Bloodletting
- Released: 1990
- Genre: Alternative rock; gothic rock
- Length: 6:04 (album version); 4:28 (single version); 7:06 (extended version)
- Label: I.R.S.
- Songwriter: Johnette Napolitano
- Producers: Chris Tsangarides; Concrete Blonde

Concrete Blonde singles chronology
"Scene Of A Perfect Crime" (1989)	"Bloodletting (The Vampire Song)" (1990)	"Joey" (1990)

Music video
- "Bloodletting (The Vampire Song)" on YouTube

"Bloodletting (The Vampire Song)" is a song by American rock band Concrete Blonde. The track was released as a single and appears as an opening track from the group's album Bloodletting (1990). The song, written and sung by frontwoman Johnette Napolitano, shows the band embracing the Goth subculture, while retaining the alternative rock sound of their previous two albums. Napolitano was inspired by her experiences in New Orleans and reading The Vampire Chronicles series in the late 1980s. Contrary to its name, the song is about the loss of human happiness, not horror or blood.

A single was released by I.R.S. in 1990. While not as successful as the album's second single, "Joey" and never reaching any major music charts, the song is considered the band's second biggest hit.

== Background ==
Frontwoman Johnette Napolitano had been spending a lot of time in New Orleans, Louisiana in the late 1980s, which she described is "as Goth as any place I’ve ever been," and reading the then-popular The Vampire Chronicles series of Gothic vampire novels by American writer Anne Rice. In August 1989, the band began recording a new album at Battery Studios, London with Chris Tsangarides, best known as a heavy metal producer, but who had also worked with alternative rock bands, such Killing Joke and The Lords of the New Church. Napolitano took influence from her recent experiences, and in doing so, embraced the Goth subculture.

The resulting album was Bloodletting, released on May 15, 1990, by I.R.S. to commercial and critical success. While considered the band's "goth" album by many, Napolitano did not feel that it was a cohesive record, but amended this in 2010 by saying "now I can see that it very much was." She continues, "I started writing songs when I was 12 and childhood wasn't very happy. Music was always a safe place for me to go to be alone. That's been the function of music my whole life." Only recently, she started appreciating her songs as if they were not her songs

== Composition and lyrics ==
"Bloodletting (The Vampire Song)" starts with a sound like the chittering of giant ants in the 1950s horror movie Them! The song retains the band's alternative rock style, while embracing gothic rock. Napolitano's songwriting and singing is influenced by roots music, while Mankey's riffing is influenced by blues. With a duration of six minutes and four seconds on the album version, the song is the longest on Bloodletting, and features gang vocals on the chorus.

Contrary to popular belief and its subtitle, "Bloodletting (The Vampire Song)", is not about vampires. Matthew Perpetua of Rolling Stone wrongly claims "Napolitano sings entirely unambiguous lyrics about New Orleans blood suckers." As debunked by Greg Sandow of Entertainment Weekly, the song is about the loss of human happiness, not about horror or blood. This is clarified by the eighth track on the album, "The Beast", in which the monster that breaks the narrator's heart is a metaphor for a failed relationship. The horror in the song and the rest of the album is psychological.

Napolitano drew inspiration from Anne Rice's 1976 novel Interview with the Vampire to write a song where the narrator's ex partner is a metaphorical vampire who sucks the happiness from their life. Speaking to the Chicago Tribune, Napolitano revealed, "The song is downright funny to me. It's supposed to have been a real lighthearted romp through New Orleans." She added to the Vancouver Sun, "I had just read [the] book and I imagined all this imagery. It was a blast, and I didn't take it very seriously at all, it was just fun."

== Release ==
In the US, "Bloodletting (The Vampire Song)" was released to radio in August 1990. While not as successful as the album's second single, "Joey" and never reaching any major music charts, it reached No. 30 on CMJ New Music Report magazine's Top Cuts chart on August 17, 1990, based on the airplay it received on college radio.

In Europe, a CD single was released in 1990, and shortened to four minutes and 28 seconds, with the six minute and four second album version as a double A-side. Two extended remixes of the song, one with French vocals and another with German were included as the B-side. In the UK, a 12" vinyl of the song was released, also in 1990. This single has the English Album Version, French Version and German Version, as well as the Extended Version. It is the same as the latter two, going for seven minutes and six seconds, but with English vocals.

== Music video ==
A screenshot of Napolitano singing in a chair from the alternate music video

A music video, with Napolitano singing as she wears goth clothing and performs on stage with her band, was released in 1990. An adaptation of Interview with the Vampire, a novel by Anne Rice, it predates Neil Jordan's film adaptation by four years. She struggled to put such a long novel into a five minute video. Napolitano faced backlash from Miles Copeland III, the executive of I.R.S. in securing the rights to Anne Rice's novel to make the video, who along with Andy Lee, the director of an earlier Concrete Blonde video, "Joey" faced opposition from record executives over their vision of the video. The former was an era-defining video in terms of videography despite this.

Two music videos of "Bloodletting (The Vampire Song)" were released. Both use footage that Lee recorded at Ockwells Manor, a 15th century manor house in England, but the less popular of the two videos has different shots of Napolitano singing in a chair. The monochrome shots have her wearing more revealing goth clothing than in the rest of the video. Only the more popular of the two videos has been uploaded on the band's YouTube channel, but both were played on MTV back in the day.

== Critical reception ==
Jim Allen of uDiscoverMusic noted the song has "foreboding goth-blues riffing" and "necromantic lyrics" making it as memorable as the album's second single, "Joey". On the other hand, Jane Roser of That Music Magazine is a bigger fan of "Bloodletting (The Vampire Song)", praising Napolitano's "gut-wrenching emotion and a twisted sense of excitement with her distinct throaty vocals" and labeling the song an "an eerie, chilling tune that could be the closing credit song for Interview With the Vampire." Greg Sandow of Entertainment Weekly feels the song is "propelled by a stalking bass riff."

Dakotah Blanton of Music Grotto ranked the song at eighth place on his "31 Best Songs About Vampires" list, stating "it helped the band shift into gothic rock and continue their forays into alt-rock." Matthew Perpetua of Rolling Stone also included the song on his "The 15 Greatest Songs About Vampires" list (in no particular order), praising its "vamp glamour," "sexy groove" and "slashing horror-movie guitars." David Hyland of Wisconsin Public Radio listed the song as an honorable mention on his "Soundbytes: Pop Music’s 5 Best Vampire Songs list."

== Track listings ==
All tracks are written by Johnette Napolitano.

European CD single
No.	Title	Length
1.	"Bloodletting (The Vampire Song)" (English Short Version)	4:28
2.	"Bloodletting (The Vampire Song)" (English Album Version)	6:04
3.	"Bloodletting (The Vampire Song)" (French Version)	7:06
4.	"Bloodletting (The Vampire Song)" (German Version)	7:06
Total length:		24:44

UK 12-inch single
No.	Title	Length
1.	"Bloodletting (The Vampire Song)" (Extended Version)	7:06
2.	"Bloodletting (The Vampire Song)" (English Album Version)	6:04
3.	"Bloodletting (The Vampire Song)" (French Version)	7:06
4.	"Bloodletting (The Vampire Song)" (German Version)	7:06
Total length:		27:22

== Personnel ==
- Johnette Napolitano – vocals, bass guitar, production
- James Mankey – guitars, bass guitar, production, additional recording and mixing
- Paul Thompson – drums, production
- Steve Wynn – vocals

Technical

- Chris Tsangarides – production, recording, engineering
- Chris Marshall – production assistance
- Earle Mankey and James Mankey – additional recording and mixing
- Evren Göknar – mastering (20th Anniversary Edition)
