= Sahar Z =

Sahar Z 'סהר זנגילביץ
- Also known as: Sahar Z
- Born: Sahar Zangilevitch Israel, 1970s
- Genres: House; Progressive house; Tech house
- Occupations: Record producer; disc jockey; record label owner
- Years active: 1996–present
- Labels: Bedrock Records (Lost & Found); EDGE; Armadillo Records

Sahar Z (born Sahar Zangilevitch; Hebrew: 'סהר זנגילביץ) is an Israeli music producer and Electronic music DJ who specialises in "harsh" yet melodic tech and progressive house music. He is closely associated with the Lost & Found label, an imprint of John Digweed's Bedrock Records. In 2014 he released the album Time along with fellow producer Guy Mantzur.

Until 2020, he frequently toured internationally. Sahar is an owner and resident DJ at the largest and most popular underground club in Tel Aviv, The Cat & Dog.

== Career ==
He cites Kraftwerk, Giorgio Moroder, Art of Noise and Pink Floyd as early influences, and says that in recent years he typically discovers new music via Beatport and YouTube. Following his discharge from military service, Sahar began DJing in 1996 at Haoman 17 in Israel.

Sahar's many collaborations have included recordings with fellow Israeli DJs and producers Guy J, Guy Gerber and Chico Shuella. His 2020 album with Mantzur, "Time", was described by Decoded magazine as "distinctly mind blowing on all levels of melodic music". In 2020, his remix of Creative Culture's "Remember the Future" was listed as number 8 in Magnetic Magazines "15 Best Progressive House Tracks Of April 2020".

Along with Guy J, Sahar founded the Armadillo Records record label in 2017, which specialises in releasing "downtempo music and experimental [electronic] music". As of January 2021, a second album, to be released with Vic F under the alias of "The Scientists", is in production and planned for release.

Sahar is married and has children.

== Equipment ==
When recording he has said that "for melodies, pads, chords & basslines I use the Roland Juno6, Nordlead4, Deepmind12, Model D, Virus and more, and for the creation of groove elements I use Maschine by NI".

He believes that, overall, advances in digital recording and the reduction in hardware prices has led to a glut of lower quality electronic music. In 2020 he observed how "in this digital age to open a record label doesn’t require a large financial investment any more, you can release tracks with costs that are minimal. Technology today allows anyone to be able to mix, take these two things and put them together, that’s the reason for that amount of non-quality Dj’s and non-quality music flooding the market."

== Discography ==
=== Albums ===
- Time (with Guy Mantzur), 2014. Lost & Found records

=== Singles & EPs ===
The following is an incomplete list:

- "Mixed Feelings / Zikaron", 2020. Lost and Found
- "Guts Over Fear" (with Vic F), 2019. EDGE records
- "Dreamless Sleep", 2018. PAF053
- ""Ollie" (with Vic F), 2018. Anjunadeep records
- "Smoothy Moody/They Made Me Do It" (with Chicola), 2014. Lost & Found
- "Sneaky Monkey", 2009. Definitive
- "Hazui" (with Guy J), 2006. Fabric records
