= Galestian =

Electronic music artist

GALESTIAN
- Genres: Deep house; Progressive house; Melodic house; Techno
- Years active: 2000-present
- Labels: Perfecto Black; Perspectives Digital; Black Hole Recordings; Click Records; ICONYC Music; Outta Limits Recordings
- Website: galestianmusic.com

Arthur Galestian, known mononymously as Galestian (often stylized as GALESTIAN), is an electronic music artist, producer, DJ, and radio personality – primarily known within the sub-genres of deep house, progressive house, melodic house and techno. In 2017, he signed as an artist to Grammy-nominated Paul Oakenfold's Perfecto Black record label with a debut release called "Rituals". In 2018, he was featured as a guest on Paul Oakenfold's Planet Perfecto Radio (episode 383), which reached over 27 million listeners in over 70 countries. In 2019, Paul Oakenfold and Galestian collaborated on a song entitled "Summer Nights" to celebrate the 50th release of Perfecto Black.

He is also signed to Darin Epsilon's Perspectives Digital imprint.

Galestian has performed at events and venues including Amsterdam Dance Event, Miami Winter Music Conference, Burning Man, Sankeys Tokyo, Insomniac Events, Tanjong Beach Club in Singapore and Exchange LA. He has been billed with artists including Above & Beyond, Aly & Fila, Armin van Buuren, Carl Cox, Chris Lake, Dubfire, Fehrplay, Frankie Bones, Grum, Lange, Nick Warren and Matthew Dekay.

Galestian was formerly a board operator and producer at KIIS FM and 98.7 FM in Los Angeles. His career in radio began on KUCI 88.9 FM. Today, his syndicated music show, Global Entry Radio, airs on Mambo Radio 89.4 FM in Ibiza and other radio stations globally. The show also broadcasts on digital stations including Digitally Imported.

In 2017, Galestian published an e-book called The Nomadic Music Producer's Handbook, derived from his experiences in long-term international travel and music production.

Galestian was a winner of the 2006 Las Vegas Music Conference DJ Competition.

He is based between Berlin and Los Angeles.
