= Akoustik Piano =

Sample-based virtual instrument

Akoustik Piano is a virtual instrument developed by Native Instruments for both the Mac OS X and Windows XP platforms. It uses a large collection of audio samples taken from three grand pianos and an upright piano. It was announced in July 2005 at a price of US$349, with release set for September 2005. Native Instruments discontinued Akoustik Piano when Komplete 6 was released, but the same sample libraries stayed on sale as the Classic Piano Collection for Kontakt and Kontakt Player.

It runs as a stand-alone program or as a plug-in for a digital audio workstation.

== Sampled instruments ==
The pianos sampled include Steinway concert grand piano model D, Imperial Bösendorfer (grand piano 290), Bechstein D 280 and the upright piano Steingraeber 130. The four sample libraries take up about 15 GB of disk space, each supplied on its own DVD. The samples are recorded at 24-bit/44.1 kHz.

== Playback adjustments ==
Settings include MIDI channel, transposition, tuning, velocity curve, a three-band equalizer, stereo pan and width, and lid position (open, half-open or closed). A convolution reverb offers four rooms (Concert Hall, Cathedral, Jazz Club and Recording Studio) with adjustable amount, size and distance, and the mechanical noises of the pedals and keys can be adjusted. A sustain resonance feature recreates the sound of the strings and body after the dampers are lifted, and the software includes a two-track recorder and a MIDI file player.

== Supported technology ==
Virtual Studio Technology (VST), Audio Units, RTAS and DXi plug-ins are supported, as are the Audio Stream Input/Output (ASIO), Apple Computer's Core Audio and Microsoft's DirectSound audio interfaces. Akoustik Piano is a Macintosh Universal Binary.
