= Signal – The Southeast Electronic Music Festival =

- Dates: September 23–26, 2010
- Locations: Chapel Hill, North Carolina, U.S. Carrboro, North Carolina, U.S.
- Years active: 2006–present
- Website: www.signalfest.com

Signal – The Southeast Electronic Music Festival is an annual music festival held in Chapel Hill and Carrboro, North Carolina. It is sometimes colloquially referred to as Signalfest or Signal Fest. Begun in 2006 by a group of Chapel Hill DJs and producers seeking to build on the small but vibrant local electronic dance music scene, the festival is now entering its fifth year. It was initially founded as a commercial venture, but has since moved to a non-profit format and is now managed by the Signal Foundation.

The 2010 festival was held September 23–26.

== Format ==
Although billed as an electronic music festival, performers have also covered a wide range of related genres including hip-hop, turntablism, and experimental music such as microsound. Building on the deep pool of talented local DJs in the Triangle area, the festival aims to showcase talent from the southeast United States, usually anchored by several headlining acts from throughout North America. The festival has also been noted as a platform for up-and-coming artists, and has hosted emerging talent such as Crystal Castles and Wale.

The festival usually takes place over 3 or 4 days, and is held across multiple venues in Chapel Hill and Carrboro, from larger clubs to restaurant/bars and coffee shops, depending on the artists and genre. Workshops for producers and artists have become an increasingly important part of the festival, with past workshops giving festival attendees the chance to meet and interact with artists such as Kid Koala, Negativland, and The Foreign Exchange.

== Past festivals and artists ==
=== 2006 ===
The inaugural Signal festival was held April 6–8, 2006. Artists included:

- Deepsky (DJ Set)
- Jason Forrest
- Robbie Hardkiss

=== 2007 ===
The second festival, held April 26–28, 2007, was the most ambitious to date in terms of sheer scope. Festival organizers brought together over 80 artists and performers, including:

- Derrick May
- Stacey Pullen
- Crystal Castles
- Donald Glaude
- Richard Chartier
- Negativland
- Souls of Mischief
- Masta Ace
- The Nein
- Ego Likeness
- Machine Drum AKA Travis Stewart
- Black Milk
- SNMNMNM

=== 2008 ===
The third Signal festival was held on April 10–12, 2008. Although somewhat smaller in scope than the first two years, the festival still showcased many well-known electronic and hip-hop artists, including:

- DJ Babu, J-Rocc, & DJ Rhettmatic of The World Famous Beat Junkies
- Supastition
- Brother Reade
- DJ Garth
- Stella by Starlight
- Freaky Flow
- Kev Brown
- Akrobatik
- Tanya Morgan
- Kaze
- Keith Fullerton Whitman

=== 2009 ===
The fourth Signal festival was held April 16–19, 2009. Over 50 artists performed over the four days, including:

- Kid Koala
- Teebee
- Jason Jollins
- Wale
- Colin Munroe
- The Foreign Exchange
- YahZarah
- Darien Brockington (of Justus League)
- Daz-I-Kue (of Bugz In The Attic)

== See also ==
- List of electronic music festivals
