= Mario Ochoa =

Mario Ochoa may refer to:

- Mario Ochoa (footballer) (born 1927), Mexican football midfielder
- Mario Ochoa (DJ) (born 1982), DJ and producer
