= List of electro house artists =

The following is a list of electro house artists.

== A–D ==
- A-Trak
- Afrojack
- Alesso
- Erol Alkan
- Steve Aoki
- The Avener
- Avicii
- Danny Ávila
- Benny Benassi
- Bingo Players
- Blasterjaxx
- The Bloody Beetroots
- Bodyrox
- Booka Shade
- Boys Noize
- Breakbot
- Busy P
- Felix Cartal
- CFCF
- The Chainsmokers
- Chuckie
- Clockwork
- Cold Blank
- Congorock
- The Count & Sinden
- Crookers
- Dada Life
- Daft Punk
- John Dahlbäck
- deadmau5
- Digitalism
- Dimitri Vegas & Like Mike
- Diplo
- Dirty South
- DJ Ajax
- DJ Tocadisco
- Duck Sauce

== E–N ==
- Fake Blood
- Fedde le Grand
- Feed Me
- Felguk
- Felix da Housecat
- Dillon Francis
- Joachim Garraud
- Martin Garrix
- Goldierocks
- Green Velvet
- David Guetta
- Hard Rock Sofa
- Hardwell
- Calvin Harris
- Icona Pop
- Sebastian Ingrosso
- Jack Beats
- JDevil
- Justice
- Kavinsky
- Kelis
- Kill the Noise
- Knife Party
- Krewella
- Laidback Luke
- Le Castle Vania
- Tommy Lee
- Lo-Fi-Fnk
- Lützenkirchen
- Madeon
- Major Lazer
- Malente
- Mason
- Spoek Mathambo
- Medicine 8
- Kris Menace
- Mr. Oizo
- MSTRKRFT
- NERVO
- NuBreed

== O–Z ==
- Ummet Ozcan
- Morgan Page
- Ewan Pearson
- Peking Duk
- The Potbelleez
- Eric Prydz
- R3hab
- Robbie Rivera
- Porter Robinson
- Sam La More
- Sidney Samson
- Sander van Doorn
- SebastiAn
- Shinichi Osawa
- Shit Robot
- Shout Out Out Out Out
- Showtek
- Simian Mobile Disco
- Skrillex
- Ivan Smagghe
- Sneaky Sound System
- Martin Solveig
- Stephan Bodzin vs Marc Romboy
- Surkin
- Swedish House Mafia
- Tiefschwarz
- Tiësto
- Tiga
- TJH87
- Tommy Trash
- Totally Enormous Extinct Dinosaurs
- Treasure Fingers
- Tujamo
- Uffie
- Vandalism
- David Vendetta
- VINAI
- Vitalic
- Alan Walker
- Wolfgang Gartner
- Yolanda Be Cool
- Yuksek
- Zedd
- Zomboy

== See also ==
- Lists of musicians
- List of house music artists
- List of progressive house artists
- List of club DJs
