= Elektrik Piano =

- Elektrik Piano 1.0
- Developer(s): Native Instruments
- Stable release: 1.5 / April 2007
- Operating system: Microsoft Windows, Mac OS X
- Type: Audio instrument plugin
- License: Proprietary
- Website: Native Instruments product page

Elektrik Piano is a sample-based software synthesizer developed by Native Instruments. The instrument is an emulation of four "classic" electric pianos – the Fender Rhodes MKI and MKII, the Hohner Clavinet E7 and the Wurlitzer A200.

It was originally released in May 2004. The latest version, 1.5, was released in April 2007. Elektrik Piano unites the classical sounds of these fundamental electronic pianos with the power of modern computer-based composing music.
