= Dosem =

Spanish record producer and DJ

- Also known as: Dosem
- Born: Marc Ramirez; 28 November 1988 (age 37); Girona, Catalonia, Spain
- Genres: House; Progressive house; Tech house
- Occupations: Record producer; disc jockey; record label owner
- Years active: 2008–present
- Label: Sino, Anjunadeep

Marc Ramirez (born 28 November 1988), better known as Dosem, is a Spanish record producer and DJ, from Girona, Catalonia. His sets consist of variants of techno and deep house.

After opening for Hong Kong–based DJ Technasia at an event in Barcelona, Dosem with his record label Sino in 2008, releasing the singles "Silent Drop" and "Bension01" in 2009 and 2010, followed by his critically acclaimed album Parallel in 2011. Dosem has regarded the following as some of his preferred equipment: Maschine from NI, Monark, Driver, Guitar Rig, Replika XT, Omnisphere, Spire, M1, Arturia Jupiter-8, Fabfilter Pro- L, UAD Massive Passive, Bax EQ, Moog Multimode Filter, Fairchild 660/670.

In September 2020, Dosem released the album Dream Decoder, much of which was composed during a visit to Tokyo. "Tower" was the first single release from the album.

== Discography ==
=== Albums ===
- Parallel (Sino, 2011)
- City Cuts (Suara, 2014)
- Dream Decoder (Anjunadeep, 2020)
- Digital Futures (Anjunadeep,2022)
- Desire (Anjunadeep, 2024)

=== Singles and EPs ===
- "Silent Drop" (Sino, 2009)
- "Bension 01" (Sino, 2010)
- "Beyond Standards" (Break New Soil, 2012)
- "Intruders" (Suara, 2012)
- "Replicants" (Suara, 2012)
- "Tales of Tomorrow" (Tronic, 2012)
- "That Look" (Suara, 2013)
- "Urban Code" (Suara, 2014)
- "Evidence" (Truesoul, 2019)
