= Henry Saiz =

Spanish electronic DJ and music producer

- Also known as: Hal Incandenza, H.Haze
- Born: Enrique Saiz Gonzalez; Madrid, Spain
- Genres: Progressive electronic, house, IDM, electronica, psychedelia
- Occupations: DJ, producer
- Instruments: Keyboards, synthesizers, turntables, bass guitar
- Years active: 2006-present
- Labels: Natura Sonoris; Lost Worlds Records; Balance; Bedrock; Paradigma Musik
- Member of: Henry Saiz & Band
- Website: www.henrysaiz.com

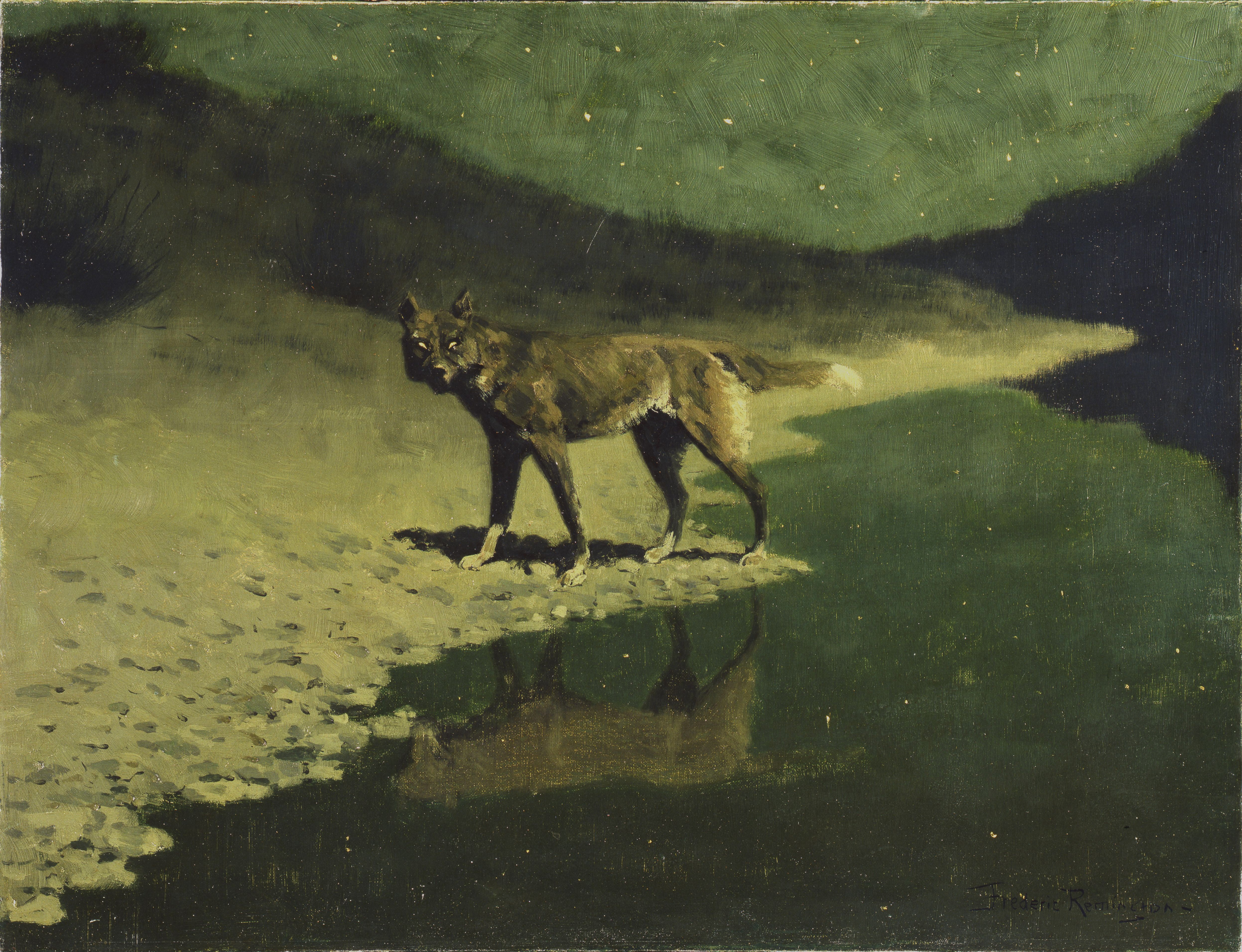
Moonlight, Wolf, used as image and cropped into front cover of Henry Saiz' 2013 debut album, Reality Is For Those Who Are Not Strong Enough To Confront Their Dreams, oil on canvas by Frederic Remington, used under license and with thanks to Addison Gallery of American Art, Massachusetts, USA.

Henry Saiz is a Spanish electronic DJ, musician and music producer. Saiz' first productions were released through the Global Underground and Paradigma Musik imprints. His remix of Lamur by Guy J, released on the Bedrock label, was produced in 2009 after he came to the attention of John Digweed, one of the label's founders. Renaissance Recordings then commissioned the releases of his EPs Artificial Paradises and Madre Noche in 2009 and The Rider in 2010. He produced the Balance 019 compilation, released on June 10, 2011, and has his own record label, Natura Sonoris, which serves as a platform for his own productions as well as those of new artists. In addition to his productions, Saiz has been developing a live show, using a combination of the Akai APC-40 controlling Ableton Live, Access Virus TI Synth and an Ipod Touch.

== Career ==
Henry Saiz' musical career began playing bass with the Spanish black metal band, NahemaH, his first and only release with the members being the symphonic metal album Chrysalis in 2001. He turned his attention to producing electronic music upon hearing the 2003 progressive house single, A Break In The Clouds, from UK-based producer James Holden. Starting his journey in Spain with underground labels, Saiz soon attracted the attention of UK giants such as Renaissance, Global Underground and Bedrock. His first official single release was in 2006. “My first vinyl releases were special moments for me, when DJ’s you’ve admired your whole life support your music, it’s a big feeling to then go on tours to places such as Asia, Australia and South America, and realize just how much the music I’d made was a part of so many people, it’s hard to explain just how amazing that was – and still is!” stated Saiz.

Saiz' own label, Natura Sonoris, won ‘Best Label’ of 2011 by DJ Magazine and his remix of Guy J’s Lamur brought him his first “Essential New Tune” from Radio 1’s Pete Tong. The same year, he was invited to mix his own CD compilation for the Balance series, a process in which he utilized vinyl, cassette, reel-to-reel tapes and over 100 field recordings that he’d recorded as a pre-teen.

Saiz' 2013 debut LP, Reality Is For Those Who Are Not Strong Enough To Confront Their Dreams, features 17 tracks embodying two years of production and recording. Fusing melodic-hypnotic house, analogue techno and retro-futuristic pop, written and partly recorded amongst a volcanic backdrop in a remote part of Lanzarote, Henry’s connection with nature and his surroundings plays a huge role in the album’s sonics, according to an interview in Resident Advisor, as well as the many sound recordings that were sent to him via his website – Henry asked his followers to send him sampled noises personal to them in a forward-thinking move to incorporate his fans into the album. The title of the album is a mixed quotation of contemporary philosopher Slavoj Žižek's in his psychoanalytic documentary, The Pervert's Guide to Cinema.

A few years later, Saiz began to crowdfund a kickstarter program, this time conceptualizing and co-producing with friends and fellow Spanish musicians Eloy Serrano and Luis Deltell under the title Henry Saiz & Band. They intended to travel across the globe to record synthesizers and create an audiovisual album featuring videos from the landscape. Securing 813 backers, the group exceeded their fundraising goal in the summer of 2016. By autumn of the same year, the group began their international journey to each of the seven continents, drawing inspiration from the local or indigenous persons and cultures of the land, the natural environment and music and field recordings to create and produce their tracks. Originally scheduled to release in mid-2017, Human was released in 2018.

When quarantining began during the COVID-19 pandemic in 2020, Saiz started a YouTube series of mixes and sets, first with 'At Home with Henry' and later addended with 'MIRAGE' in order to distinguish two separate mixing styles. The former has been chosen to showcase a wide variety of genres, themes and miscellany including and excluding electronic music. The latter, set to run typically on weekends, is geared towards clubbing and dance music.

In late 2022, Saiz announced Henry Saiz & Band would be renamed as Moonlight Wolves, releasing their first single, Gardens By The Bay, in October 2022.

== Artistry ==
Henry Saiz spent his childhood absorbing early Stanley Kubrick soundtracks and explains, “My influences are pretty diverse, taking me all the way from Italo Disco to Black Metal. From Abba [sic] to Aphex Twin, Vangelis and Pink Floyd (via Detroit) – I believe that electronic music can, and should, have a message. The infinite palate of sounds and textures give the power to evoke much more complex feelings and mindscapes than the traditional pop-rock instruments – the fact that you can dance to it in a club doesn’t mean it can’t transmit a message (and a thrill) to the listener on many levels.”

Saiz is a fan of the works of David Foster Wallace and Salvador Dalí. One of his side projects is Hal Incandenza, named after from the protagonist in Wallace's most famous novel, Infinite Jest. Producing under Hal, Saiz experiments in disco-house and experimental pop. Saiz additionally has experience in sound design, working on TV shows, documentaries and commercials, including for Disney and Nickelodeon. As Saiz explains, “sound design is always a big factor in my music, I love to add sampled soundscapes to my music – it allows me to explore the visual and psychedelic aspects of electronic music that is so important to me.”

== Discography ==
Albums

- Reality Is For Those Who Are Not Strong Enough To Confront Their Dreams (2013)
- Reality Addendum (2014)
- [Henry Saiz & Band] Human (2018)
- [H.Haze] triste (2021)

EPs

- Mamut EP (2006)
- Labyrinths Designer EP (2007)
- Liquid Gardens EP (2007)
- Artificial Paradises EP (2009)
- Madre Noche EP (2009)
- The Rider EP (2010)
- It's Not Over (2014)
- Haunted Girl Canyon EP (2014)
- We Drown Together (2015)
- Rituales EP (2015)
- Secrets EP (2016)
- Night Cult EP (2016)
- [Hal Incandenza] Incivitas (2022)

Singles

- You, The Living (2006)
- Vancouver (2008)
- [Guy J & Henry Saiz] Meridian/La Marea (2011)
- All the Evil of This World (feat. Hanin Zueiter) (2013)
- Digital Mirages Vol.1 (2019)

Compilations

- Balance 019 (2011)
- Balance Presents Natura Sonoris (2017)
- Remixed: The Downtempo Experience (2023)
- Balance 032 (2023)
