= Nahemah (band) =

Spanish heavy metal band

NahemaH
- Origin: Alicante, Spain
- Genres: Progressive death metal, melodic death metal, death-doom, gothic metal, symphonic black metal
- Years active: 1997-2012
- Labels: Iberian Moon Records; Concreto Records; Lifeforce Records
- Members: Pablo Egido; Miguel Palazón; Roberto Marco; Paco Porcel; Enrique Perez "Fabique"
- Past members: Henry Saiz; Luis Martinez; Jose Carlos Marhuenda; Daniel Gil; Javier Fernandez; Jose Diego; Quino Jimenez
- Website: Nahemah @ Myspace

NahemaH was a Spanish heavy metal band from Alicante, Spain, formed in 1997. Since then, they have released four albums. Lifeforce Records released their final two albums.

== History ==
Nahemah was formed in 1997 in Alicante, Spain. In 1999, they independently released their debut album, Edens in Communion. In 2001, signed to Iberian Moon Records, Nahemah released their second album, Chrysalis. The album was well received and was re-released by Concreto Records. Nahemah opened for bands such as Moonspell and Alastis.

During 2003, Nahemah recorded the EP The Last Human, which remains unreleased. After recording the unreleased EP, the band had line-up problems.

Between 2003 and 2005, the band was putting together their third studio album, The Second Philosophy. That album was released in 2007 via Lifeforce Records, a label that they signed to in August 2006. In 2009, Nahemah released their fourth studio album, A New Constellation, also via Lifeforce Records.

In August 2012, Nahemah announced via their official website that they had disbanded.

== Line-up ==
=== Final members ===
- Pablo Egido - vocals (1997-2012)
- Paco Porcel - bass (1997-2012)
- Miguel Palazón - guitar, synths (1997-2012)
- Roberto Marco - guitar (1997-2012)
- Enrique Pérez - drums (2009-2012)

=== Former members ===
- José Diego - drums (1997-2007)
- Quino Jiménez - drums (2007)
- Syhobsh - drums (2007-2009)
- Henry Saiz - bass (2001-2002)

== Discography ==
=== Albums ===
- Edens in Communion (Independent, 1999)
- Chrysalis (Iberian Moon Records, 2001) (re-released by Concreto Records in 2002)
- The Second Philosophy (Lifeforce Records, 2007)
- A New Constellation (Lifeforce Records, 2009)
