= NI Massive =

Software wavetable synthesizer

Massive

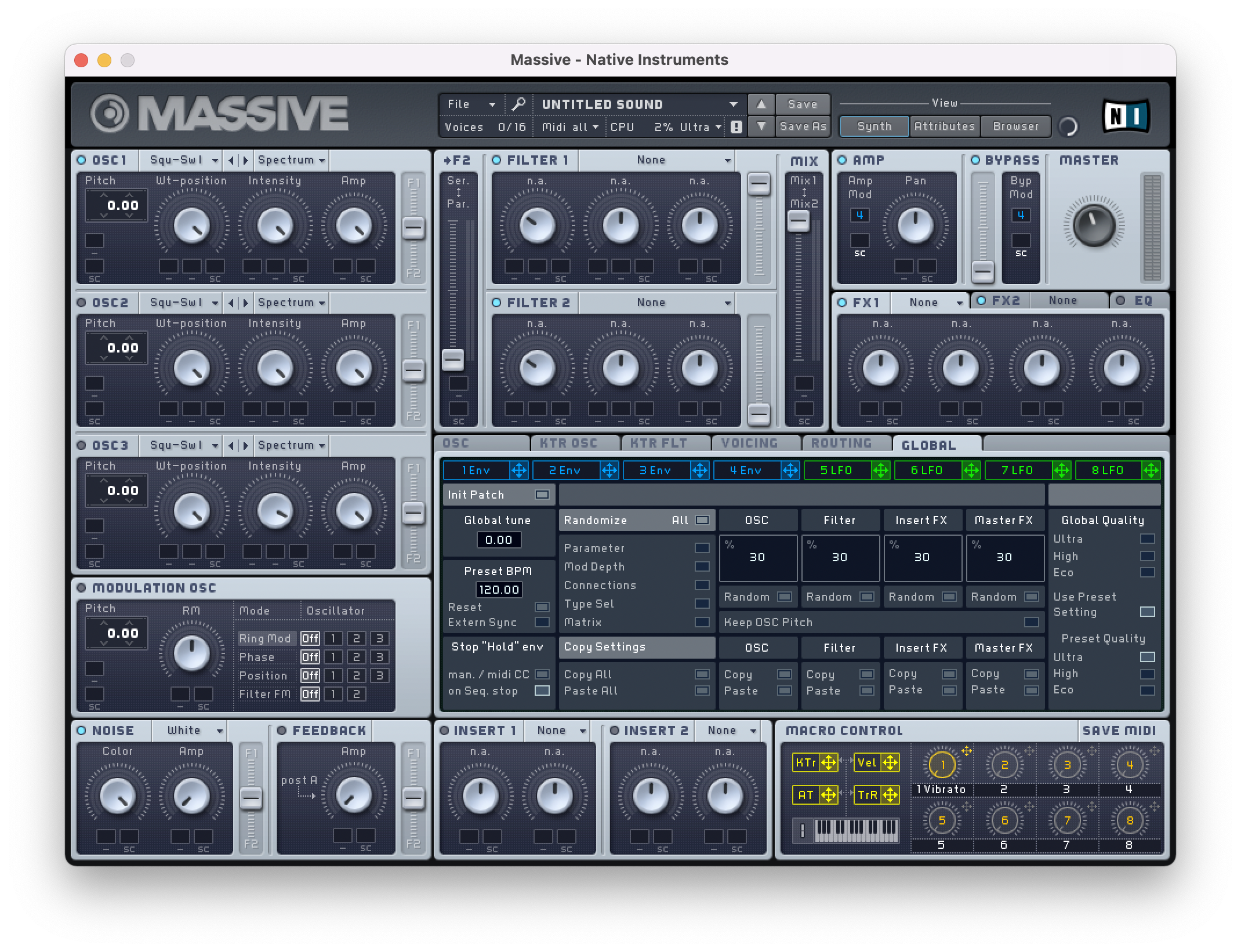
- Massive running on macOS Monterey
- Developer: Native Instruments
- Initial release: October 16, 2006
- Stable release: 1.5.12 / 2023-03-09
- Operating system: macOS, Microsoft Windows
- Type: Software synthesizer
- License: Proprietary
- Website: www.nativeinstruments.com

Massive is a commercial wavetable software synthesizer plugin manufactured by Native Instruments for use in professional audio production. It utilizes several wavetables and oscillators in the creation of synthetic timbres. The software can be used as a VST plugin within a digital audio workstation, or as a standalone program. Released in 2006, the plugin has gained widespread popularity in the electronic music field, and is one of the most popular synthesizer plugins for modern dance music production.

== Synthesis ==
Massive features a hybrid digital-analog design which is intended for the production of bass and lead sounds. Based on wavetable synthesis, the plugin’s sound is formed by three wave oscillators with separate controls for wavetable position, pitch, and wave shaping. The sound created from these oscillators can be driven through two separate filters. Onwards, the sound in output is shaped with four different envelopes, which feature settings for attack, decay, release and sustain, and these can be set individually for any knob in the plugin interface. Modulation settings include LFO, Performer and Stepper options.

== Expansions ==
In August 2018 Native Instruments announced a new line of expansion packs for Massive called Massive Expansions. Each expansion comes loaded with 150 customizable presets tailored towards a specific genre or mood. At launch expansions Stadium Flex, Nocturnal State, and Spectrum Quake were released.
