= Guitar Rig =

Guitar effects modelling software

- Guitar Rig version 5
- Developer: Native Instruments
- Release: 2004
- Stable release: 7.0.2 / February 2024; 2 years ago
- Operating system: macOS, Microsoft Windows
- Type: Guitar multi-effects processor
- License: Proprietary
- Website: www.native-instruments.com/en/products/komplete/guitar/guitar-rig-6-pro/

Demo of Guitar Rig 4
"Wet" guitar followed by "dry" DI guitar

Guitar Rig is an amp and effects modeling software package developed by Native Instruments. The software can function either as a standalone application, or as a plug-in for other software. It was originally released in 2004.

== Overview ==
The Guitar Rig environment is a modular system, providing capabilities for multiple amplifiers, effects pedals and rack mounted hardware. Primarily designed for electric guitar and bass, the software uses amplifier modeling to allow real-time digital signal processing in both standalone and DAW environments via plug-in (VST/DXi/RTAS/AU). The software simulates a number of devices such as preamplifiers, cabinets and microphones under pseudonyms (such as renaming the Shure SM57 as the "Dynamic 57").

The system allows customisation of module parameters – either through manipulation of the graphical interface, use of a MIDI controller or employment of the RigKontrol foot control pedal. Settings can be saved as presets and exported and shared with other users. Version 3 included a redesigned interface to allow improved preset categorisation and customised interfaces for "live" use.

=== Rig Kontrol ===
The Rig Kontrol is a foot-operated USB and MIDI controller. It contains an audio interface and DI box, allowing integration with live sound environments.

The device can operate Guitar Rig using eight switches and an expression pedal. Earlier versions of the device contained only six switches and an expression pedal, and did not support interfacing functionality.

== History ==
=== Versions 1-2 (2004-2006) ===
Guitar Rig was first released on both macOS & Windows in September 2004. At this time, it was a hardware/software hybrid system, with the Rig Kontrol hardware preamp and foot controller feeding into the software. The software featured a drag-and-drop interface and a selection of 3 tube amplifier emulations (some with multiple preamp variations).

Version 2 of the software, released in February 2006, added a number of additional amp options (including the software's first bass amps), added a new looping feature, and expanded the Rig Kontrol hardware.

=== Versions 3-5 (2007-2019) ===
Guitar Rig 3, released in December 2007, included the option to purchase the software independently of the hardware. The updated software also featured a streamlined view dedicated to live performances. Before version 3 was released, the graphical user interface simulated amplifier logos and design construction; however, with version 3 this was replaced with a generic name.

Released in October 2009, Guitar Rig version 4 introduced improved cabinet and microphone modeling software, alongside the "Control Room" feature, which allowed for greater customisation of preamp, cabinet and microphone combinations.

Announced in August 2011 and released in September 2011, version 5 of the software included an expanded version of the Control Room feature, and introduced the ability to perform sidechaining within the software.

=== Version 6 (2020-2023) ===
Version 6 of Guitar Rig, announced in September 2020 and released on October 1, 2020, was the first major update for the software since 2011. This new version included a redesigned user interface, "Intelligent Circuit Modelling" (an amp reproduction system based on machine learning), 3 new amp options (including 1 new bass amp), and additional effects.

=== Version 7 (2023-Present) ===
Version 7 of Guitar Rig was launched on September 6, 2023. New features include effects and amps modeled using Machine Learning (branded as Intelligent Circuit Modeling), a Looper, and a new Impulse Response loader.
