= TJH87 =

Finnish electronic music duo

- Origin: Oulu Finland
- Genres: Nu disco, electro house, electronic rock
- Years active: 2010–present
- Labels: La Valigetta, LE7ELS, Youth Control
- Members: Timo Juuti, Hector 87
- Website: www.tjh87.com

TJH87 are a Finnish electronic music duo consisting of Timo Juuti and Hector 87, founded in 2010. TJH87 are recognized for incorporating a lot of disco and rock music influences into their own unique brand of house music.

== Discography ==
=== EPs ===
- "Woo Chicks & Disco Wobblez" (2012)
- "Break Away Kicks!" (2012)
- "Deadlock" (2013)
- "Good Life (Feat. Gamble & Burke)" (2014)

=== Singles ===
- "Something About Cats" (2011)
- "Suit Up" (2011)
- "ET is PT" / "Every Bla Bla" (2011)
- "I Know It" (2011)

=== Remix ===
- Avicii – Sweat Dreams (Timo Juuti & Hector 87 Remix) (2011)
- Yanik Coen – Rain or Shine (Timo Juuti & Hector 87 Remix) (2011)
- Mr. Root – I Will Not Play R. (Timo Juuti & Hector 87 Remix) (2012)
- ARESS – Reunion (Timo Juuti & Hector 87 Remix) (2012)
- Joonas Hahmo – Sahailua (Timo Juuti & Hector 87 Remix) (2012)
- Combostar feat. Mani Hoffman – Free (Timo Juuti & Hector 87 Remix) (2012)
- Ridney – Appetizer (Timo Juuti & Hector 87 Remix) (2012)
- Satellite Stories – Kids Aren't Safe In The Metro (TJH87 Remix) (2013)
- Bad Boy Bill & DJ Bam Bam feat. Miss Palmer – Looking For Something (TJH87 Remix) (2013)
