= Roy Rosenfeld =

Israeli DJ and music producer

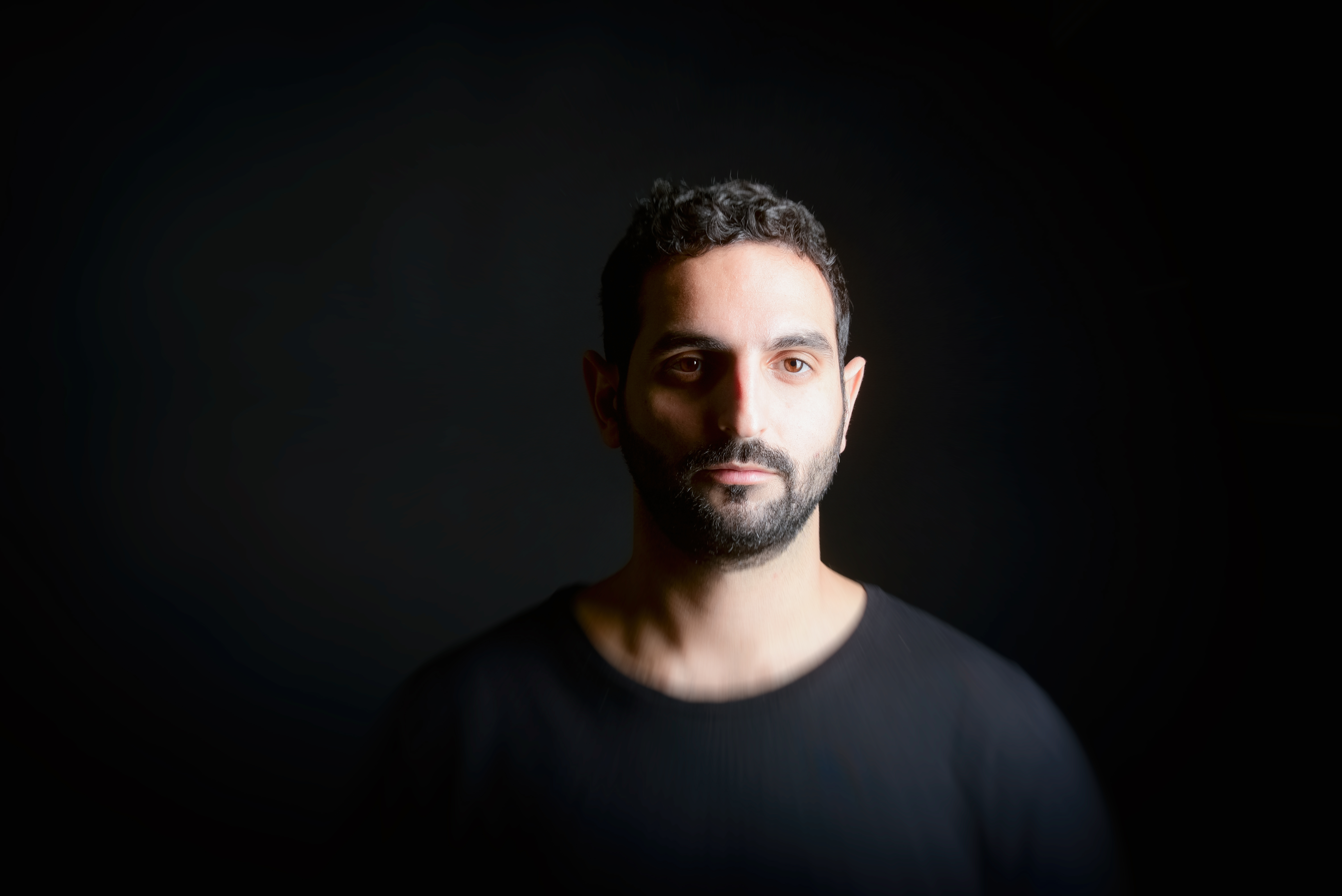
Rosenfeld in 2017

Roy Rosenfeld (Hebrew: רועי רוזנפלד) is an Israeli progressive house DJ and music producer.

== Biography ==
Rosenfeld began playing piano when he was 12, and electronic music at age 15—with a Roland RM1X given to him by his father. He released his first music commercially in 2009.

He has collaborated on multiple occasions with his friends Guy J and Eli Nissan.

== Discography ==
=== Singles & EPs ===
- "Otro", Lost & Found, 2020
- "Tikkva", Systematic Recordings, 2017
- "Skunk Dance", 2012
