= Darin Epsilon =

American musician (born 1983)

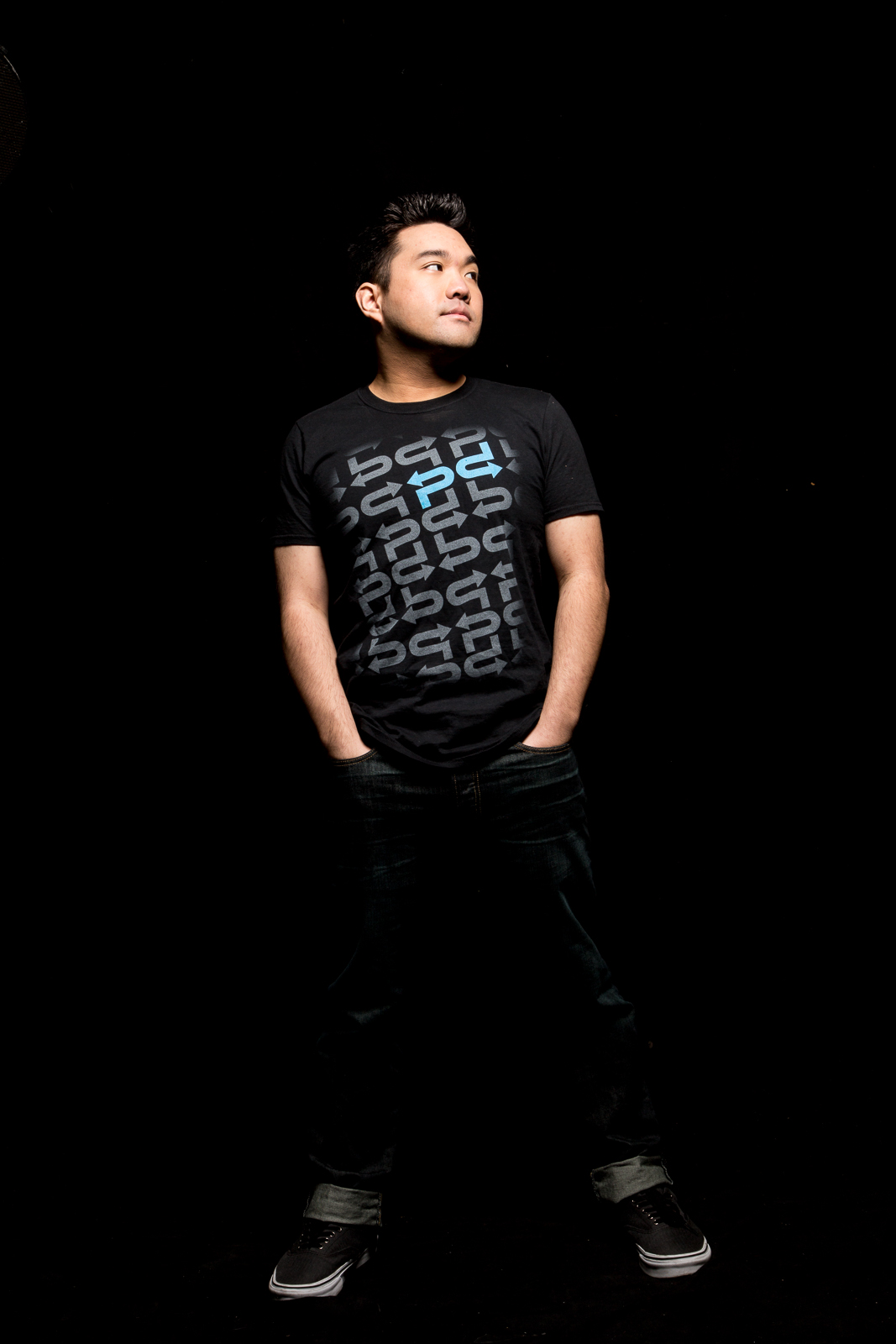

Background information
- Born: September 26, 1983 (age 42)
- Origin: Chicago, Los Angeles
- Genres: Progressive, House, Breaks
- Occupations: Music producer, DJ, radio show host, record label owner, music critic
- Years active: 2000–present
- Labels: Renaissance Recordings, Hope Recordings, Sudbeat Music, Perspectives Digital, Armada Music, Perfecto Records, Black Hole Recordings
- Website: http://www.darinepsilon.com

Darin Epsilon (born September 26, 1983) is a music producer, DJ, radio personality, record label owner, and music critic from Chicago, which is widely considered the birthplace of House music. He lived in Los Angeles from 2008 to 2016 and currently resides in Berlin as of 2017.

He is primarily known for electronic dance music, with releases on many of the industry's most respected labels including Perspectives Digital, Sudbeat, Global Underground, Renaissance, Hope Recordings, microCastle, Selador, and Perfecto Records. His productions have entered Beatport's Top 100 charts numerous times and are featured in the compilations of Nick Warren, Hernan Cattaneo, Armin van Buuren, Markus Schulz, and Paul Oakenfold, among many others. He has collaborated with Hernan Cattaneo, Robert Babicz, Betoko, John Graham a.k.a. Quivver, Matt Lange, Matthew Dekay, Cid Inc, Omid 16B (S.O.S.), and Chris Fortier, among countless others.

In 2016 he was nominated for ‘Best Progressive House Artist’ in the annual Beatport Awards, and in 2011, John Digweed named him one of the winners in his 'Structures' DJ Mix Competition, sponsored by Bedrock and Ableton Live. The all-star panel of judges consisted of Oliver Lieb, Nick Muir, King Unique, Robert Babicz, and Digweed himself. Contestants were required to put together their best 25 to 30 minute mix using the tracks that appeared on the 'Structures Two' compilation. To make it even more special, 'Structures' DJ tools were included to weave into their sets.

As a DJ, he has shared the stage with many of dance music's superstars including Hernan Cattaneo, Nick Warren, John Digweed, Sasha, James Zabiela, Armin van Buuren B2B Markus Schulz, Above & Beyond, BT, and among others. He has headlined over 7 major festivals by North America's biggest promoter, Insomniac Events, and been invited to perform at Amsterdam Dance Event, Ultra Music Festival, Burning Man, BPM Festival, and South By Southwest (SXSW). He regularly tours the world to perform, and has electrified audiences across the United States, as well as headlined dozens of countries across 6 continents.

He currently hosts a monthly radio show and podcast called Perspectives. Established in November 2006, the show is split into two parts, with the first being his own 60 minute set, followed by a guest mix from an established artist. Perspectives has allowed him to feature dozens of respected names in the industry including Darren Emerson (formerly of Underworld (band)), Max Graham, Robert Babicz, Max Cooper, Guy J, Jody Wisternoff (one-half Way Out West with Nick Warren), and many more. The first broadcasts were on Digitally Imported (DI.fm), but the program has since moved to Frisky Radio. His record label Perspectives Digital was launched in November 2010 as an extension of the brand, further solidifying his influence and presence within the global dance community.

Global brands such as MTV, American DJ, American Audio, Elation Professional, and Global Truss have all called upon him to provide the soundtrack to their videos. His music can also be found in two films, placing him in a small category of producers that have ever made it onto the big screen.

== Discography ==
=== Albums ===
Album name	Label	Year
Darin Epsilon Pres. Perspectives Digital Vol. 5	Perspectives Digital	2013
Darin Epsilon Pres. Perspectives Digital Vol. 4	Perspectives Digital	2012
Darin Epsilon Pres. Perspectives Digital Vol. 3	Perspectives Digital	2012
Darin Epsilon Pres. Perspectives Digital Vol. 2	Perspectives Digital	2011
Darin Epsilon Pres. Perspectives Digital Vol. 1	Perspectives Digital	2011

=== Original productions ===
Artist	Track name	Label	Year
Darin Epsilon	Valencia	Perspectives Digital	2013
Darin Epsilon pres. Eventide	Cosmic Discovery	Perspectives Digital	2013
Darin Epsilon	Red Matter	Sudbeat Music	2013
Darin Epsilon	Shine The Light	Renaissance Recordings	2013
Darin Epsilon & Tom Sela	Lapis Lazuli	Flow Vinyl	2012
Darin Epsilon pres. Eventide	Goodbye World	Perspectives Digital	2012
Darin Epsilon & Tom Sela	Metamorph	Mesmeric	2011
Darin Epsilon	Bahamut	Movement Recordings	2011
Walsh & Coutre vs Darin Epsilon	Detour on 44	Perspectives Digital	2011
Darin Epsilon & Paronator	Esperanto	Perspectives Digital	2010
Darin Epsilon	Samaritan Life	Nueva Digital	2010
Darin Epsilon & Ad Brown	Cold Water	Silk Royal Records	2010
Darin Epsilon	Aural Satisfaction	Inkfish Recordings	2009
Darin Epsilon pres. Mimoori	Kwaidan	Inkfish Recordings	2009
Darin Epsilon	Bluephobia	Source of Gravity Digital	2008
Darin Epsilon	Tahitian Sunrise	Dissident	2008
Darin Epsilon pres. Mimoori	Green Destiny	Source of Gravity Digital	2008
Darin Epsilon pres. Eventide	Estrellas	Biohazard Digital	2007

=== Remixes ===
Artist	Track name	Label	Year
Javier Portilla & Sotela	Scallywag (Darin Epsilon Remix)	Perspectives Digital	2013
Konektiv	Evolving Aspirations (Darin Epsilon Remix)	Molecule Recordings	2013
Dezarate & Michel Manzano	Soul Is In The Air (Darin Epsilon Remix)	Perfecto Records	2012
Fusion F & Come T	Blue River (Darin Epsilon Remix)	Nueva Digital	2012
Chris & Perry Domingo	Latitude (Darin Epsilon Remix)	Black Hole Recordings	2012
Chris Fortier	Twinkle Me (Darin Epsilon Vocal Mix)	Silence Through Music	2010
Chris Fortier	Twinkle Me (Darin Epsilon Instrumental Mix)	Silence Through Music	2010
Alucard	Dancing Under The Stars (Darin Epsilon Remix)	Nueva Digital	2010
Sezer Uysal	Weird Walking In Bursa (Darin Epsilon Remix)	Baroque Records	2010
Maxi Valvona	Revolve (Darin Epsilon Remix)	microCastle	2010
Overcast	Clear Sky (Darin Epsilon Remix)	Polytechnic Recordings	2009
D:FUSE & Mike Hiratzka	Tobias (Darin Epsilon Remix)	Lost Angeles Recordings	2009
Hibernate	Left Alone (Darin Epsilon Remix)	Perfecto Digital	2009
Matthew Dekay	If I Could Fly (Darin Epsilon Remix)	Deep Records	2008
Cristian Paduraru	Letters From The Edge (Darin Epsilon 'Clubbing In Omsk' Mix)	Christian Records	2008
Coalesced	Cortina (Darin Epsilon Remix)	Polytechnic Recordings	2008
Kenneth Thomas	Riders On The Storm (Darin Epsilon Remix)	Dissident	2008
Jose Acosta	Octopus (Darin Epsilon Remix)	Vise Versa Music	2008
Noel Sanger	What Are You Looking For (Darin Epsilon Remix)	System Recordings	2008
Burufunk	Outsider (Stuart C vs Darin Epsilon Extended Rework)	Navigation Records	2007
Burufunk	Outsider (Stuart C vs Darin Epsilon Club Edit)	Navigation Records	2007
Noel Sanger	Nothing (Darin Epsilon Dub)	Curvve Recordings	2007
Noel Sanger	Nothing (Darin Epsilon Remix)	Curvve Recordings	2007
Compound Bass	Entropy (Darin Epsilon Remix)	Red Circle Music	2007

=== Remixed ===
Artist	Track name	Label	Year
Darin Epsilon pres. Eventide	Cosmic Discovery (Kastis Torrau & Arnas D Remix)	Perspectives Digital	2013
Darin Epsilon pres. Eventide	Cosmic Discovery (Dale Middleton Remix)	Perspectives Digital	2013
Darin Epsilon	Shine The Light (Ryan Davis Reconstruct)	Hope Recordings	2013
Darin Epsilon & Tom Sela	Lapis Lazuli (Lank Remix)	Flow Vinyl	2012
Darin Epsilon & Tom Sela	Lapis Lazuli (Andre Sobota Remix)	Flow Vinyl	2012
Darin Epsilon & Tom Sela	Lapis Lazuli (DNYO Remix)	Flow Vinyl	2012
Darin Epsilon	Bahamut (Fiord Remix)	Replug	2011
Darin Epsilon	Bahamut (Cid Inc. Remix)	Replug	2011
Darin Epsilon & Tom Sela	Metamorph (Deepfunk's Main Mix)	Mesmeric	2011
Darin Epsilon & Tom Sela	Metamorph (Deepfunk's 5AM Mix)	Mesmeric	2011
Darin Epsilon & Tom Sela	Metamorph (Luis Junior Remix)	Mesmeric	2011
Walsh & Coutre vs Darin Epsilon	Detour on 44 (Dousk Remix)	Perspectives Digital	2011
Walsh & Coutre vs Darin Epsilon	Detour on 44 (Cid Inc. Remix)	Perspectives Digital	2011
Walsh & Coutre vs Darin Epsilon	Detour on 44 (Lanny May Remix)	Perspectives Digital	2011
Darin Epsilon & Paronator	Esperanto (Satoshi Fumi 'Another Sky' Mix)	Perspectives Digital	2010
Darin Epsilon	Samaritan Life (Fine Taste Remix)	Nueva Digital	2010
Darin Epsilon	Samaritan Life (Thomas Penton Remix)	Nueva Digital	2010
Darin Epsilon pres. Mimoori	Green Destiny (Section 75 Soundscapes Edit)	Source of Gravity Digital	2010
Darin Epsilon & Ad Brown	Cold Water (Playton Remix)	Silk Royal Records	2010
Darin Epsilon & Ad Brown	Cold Water (Dezza Remix)	Silk Royal Records	2010
Darin Epsilon	Aural Satisfaction (Sezer Uysal's Never Satisfied Remix)	Inkfish Recordings	2009
Darin Epsilon	Aural Satisfaction (Inkfish In Indica Satisfaction Land Mix)	Inkfish Recordings	2009
Darin Epsilon pres. Mimoori	Kwaidan (Luke Porter Remix)	Inkfish Recordings	2009
Darin Epsilon pres. Mimoori	Kwaidan (Bale & Voltaire Remix)	Inkfish Recordings	2009
Darin Epsilon	Tahitian Sunrise (Stryke's Red Sun Remix)	Dissident	2009
Darin Epsilon	Tahitian Sunrise (Mark Ivan Remix)	Dissident	2009
Darin Epsilon	Bluephobia (Noosh & Girard Remix)	Source of Gravity Digital	2008
Darin Epsilon	Bluephobia (Moonchine Remix)	Source of Gravity Digital	2008
Darin Epsilon	Bluephobia (Jairus Miller Aquamarine Mix)	Source of Gravity Digital	2008
Darin Epsilon	Bluephobia (Jairus Miller Colorblind Mix)	Source of Gravity Digital	2008
Darin Epsilon pres. Mimoori	Green Destiny (Jairus Miller Remix)	Source of Gravity Digital	2008
Darin Epsilon pres. Mimoori	Green Destiny (Noosh & Girard Deep Melodic Mix)	Source of Gravity Digital	2008
Darin Epsilon pres. Mimoori	Green Destiny (Noosh & Girard Remix)	Source of Gravity Digital	2008
Darin Epsilon pres. Mimoori	Green Destiny (Section 75 Remix)	Source of Gravity Digital	2008
Darin Epsilon pres. Eventide	Estrellas (Channel Surfer Remix)	Biohazard Digital	2007
Darin Epsilon pres. Eventide	Estrellas (Bitwise Remix)	Biohazard Digital	2007
Darin Epsilon pres. Eventide	Estrellas (Thee-O & Merlyn Martin Remix)	Biohazard Digital	2007
