= Kyotto =

Sri Lankan DJ

Kyotto is a Sri Lankan DJ and music producer.

He cites Marshall Jefferson and Shakin' Stevens among his influences.

== Discography ==
=== Singles & EPs ===
- "Antimony/Sweet Escape", Dopamine White, 2020
- "White Lights", Soundteller Records, 2020
