= Crizzly =

American DJ and music producer

Background information
- Also known as: Chris Marshall
- Born: Christopher Lee Marshall; January 1, 1991 (age 35); Boerne, Texas, U.S.
- Genres: Dubstep; Electro house; Hip-hop; Trap; Crunk
- Occupations: DJ, music producer
- Years active: 2010–present
- Label: Circus
- Website: crizzly.com

Christopher Lee Marshall (born January 1, 1991), better known by his stage name Crizzly, is an American DJ and producer. Currently based in Austin, Texas, he began DJing in 2010, developing a style that incorporates dubstep, crunk, hyphy, drumstep, and trap, among other genres. He has released several singles and three mixtapes, titled Crunkstep (2012), Crunkstep Volume 2: Back 2 Da Streets (2013), and "Crunkstep Volume 3: Booty by Crizzly" (2014). He has also remixed songs such as "James Brown Is Dead" by L.A. Style, "Hard in Da Paint" by Waka Flocka Flame, "Chain Hang Low" by Jibbs, "The Way We Ball" by Lil Flip, and "Put It Down" by Bassnectar and Excision.

In 2011 Crizzly co-founded two EDM club nights in San Antonio: Lifted Wednesdays at the Ivy Rooftop, and Play Thursdayzz at Club Rio. Around that time IndyMojo.com wrote that Crizzly was "dominating the crunkstep/dubstep scene with his bass heavy mixes." Crizzly tours frequently throughout the United States, and My San Antonio described a Crizzly show as "a 90-minute, adrenaline-addled hybrid of a frat party and dance marathon." He has played at festivals such as the Electric Daisy Carnival, Escape From Wonderland, the Warped Tour, and List of Lollapalooza lineups by year#Lollapalooza.

== Discography ==
=== Singles ===
- Ass Clap (ft. Nilo Stari)
- Drop Dat Ass (ft. Crichy Rich)
- Certified Gz (ft. Slim Thug)
- Like Dat (ft. Kids At The Bar)
- Like Dat (Retwerk)
- Lifted
- All Black Everything (with Figure)
- Bust It Wide Open (Retwerk)
- Ass & Titties (with Logun)
- Big Booty B*tches
- WTF
- Knocked Out (with YDG)

== Remixes ==
- Ace Hood – Bugatti (Crizzly Remix)
- Lil Flip – The Way We Ball (Crizzly Remix)
- Excision & Bassnectar – Put It Down (Crizzly Remix)
- Macklemore & Ryan Lewis – Thrift Shop (Crizzly Remix)
- T.I. – What You Know (Crizzly Remix)
- Dream – Go Hard (Crizzly Remix)
- Waka Flocka Flame – Hard In Da Paint (Crizzly Remix)
- Jibbs – Chain Hang Low (Crizzly & AFK Remix)
- ASAP Rocky – Fuckin' Problems (Crizzly Remix)
- Aj Hernz – Snap Back Swag (Crizzly Remix)
- Logun – Dat Ass (Crizzly Remix)
- Marion Band$ – Hold Up (feat. Nipsey Hustle)(Crizzly Remix)
- Willow Smith – Whip My Hair (Crizzly Remix)
- Rihanna & Steve Aoki – 1 2 Cake Cake (Crizzly Remix)
- Kids At The Bar – Like Dat (Crizzly Remix)
- Lil Wil – Bust It Wide Open (Crizzly Remix)
- Koji Kondo – Legend Of Zelda – Lost Woods (Crizzly Remix)
- L.A. Style – James Brown Is Dead (Crizzly Remix)
- Justice – Tthhee Ppaarrttyy (ft. Uffie)(Crizzly Remix)
- Three 6 Mafia – Ass & Titties (Crizzly & Logun Remix)
- A Lost People – Big Booty B**ches (Crizzly Remix)
- Vaski – Jelly (Crizzly Remix)
