= Khen (DJ) =

Israeli DJ and music producer

Khen (real name Hen Falah; Hebrew: חן פלאח) is an Israeli DJ and music producer based in Tel Aviv.

== Discography ==
=== Albums ===
- Children With No Name (with Guy Mantzur), 2016

=== Singles & EPs ===
- "My Golden Cage" (with Guy Mantzur), Bedrock, 2019
- "Carolina (Hermanez Remix)", Lost & Found, 2018
- "Dreamcatcher (original mix)", Vivrant, 2017
- "Carolina", Lost & Found, 2016
- "Sense of Time, Sudbeat, 2013
- "pito corto, Sudbeat, 2012
- "el gato volador under beat rmx, Sudbeat, 2012
- "namasteeeee, Sudbeat, 2012
