= Mario Ochoa (DJ) =

- Born: September 24, 1982 (age 43); Medellín, Colombia
- Origin: Colombia
- Genres: Tech house, House, Dance, Techno
- Years active: 1996–present
- Labels: Avenue Recordings, 100% Pure, 1605, Great Stuff, Universal, Ultra, Toolroom Records
- Website: www.marioochoa.net

Mario Ochoa (born September 24, 1982) is a Colombian DJ and producer. He is active in music production since 2000. He is best known as a producer of house and tech house, but is also active in other EDM genres.

== Biography ==
Ochoa was born in Medellín. His music career started in 1999 when he was 18 years old.

In 2003, he released his first track, "Habla con la Luna", on Disc Doctor Records, which found success in Spain, France, Mexico and South America. That same year, he was signed to "Poolemusic", owned by French DJ Antoine Clamaran, who helped to grow Ochoa's career. Since then, he has released music with labels including Ultra Records, Universal Records, Toolroom Records, Ministry of Sound, and Subliminal Records. In 2006, Ochoa launched his own record label, Avenue Recordings.

In 2008 his track "Much Better" became an international hit, followed by singles such as "The Indian Express", "BS", "Mr Boom", "Tu va ver", "Lockdown", "Big Spender", "La Cosa Nostra", "La Noche", "The Chant", "Wizard", and "Give some Love" (#7 on Billboard's dance chart), which all charted on digital stores around the world.

In 2010, Ochoa launched a fortnightly radio/podcast, "Infected Beats", which features guest mixes on each episode.

== Selected tracks ==
- 2004 - Habla con la luna
- 2006 - Give some love (with Antoine Clamaran)
- 2008 - Kalua
- 2008 - Wizard
- 2009 - So Serious
- 2009 - Much Better
- 2009 - Twisted
- 2009 - Gorilla
- 2010 - Big Spender
- 2010 - Fuckin
- 2011 - La Noche
- 2011 - Brujos y Hechiceros
- 2011 - Chronos
- 2012 - The Indian Express
- 2012 - The Chant
- 2012 - Mr. Boom
- 2012 - Alpha
- 2013 - Tu Va Ver
- 2015 - Me gusta
