= Bedrock Records =

English record label

- Founded: 1999
- Founder: John Digweed
- Status: Active
- Genre: Trance, house, techno
- Country of origin: United Kingdom
- Location: London, England
- Official website: bedrock.org.uk

Bedrock Records is an English record label for trance, progressive house and techno started by John Digweed. Its name comes from a long running and successful club night held in Hastings and also at Heaven nightclub, London – both also called Bedrock. Bedrock Records has released many singles from artists such as Astro & Glyde, Brancaccio & Aisher, Steve Lawler, Shmuel Flash, Steve Porter, Sahar Z, Guy J, Henry Saiz, Stelios Vassiloudis, Electric Rescue, The Japanese Popstars and Jerry Bonham. Bedrock is also the name that Digweed and Muir use as their production moniker.

Bedrock has had different imprints: Bedrock Breaks, B_Rock and Black (Bedrock). Currently it has Bedrock Digital and one called Lost & Found belonging to Guy J.

The first Bedrock album compiled and mixed by John Digweed was released in 1999, containing several tracks signed to the Bedrock label.

In 2018, Digweed marked the 20th anniversary of the label with the release of Bedrock XX.

== See also ==
- List of electronic music record labels
