= Jason Jollins =

American DJ and record producer

- Born: Jason Jollins
- Origin: New York, New York, United States
- Genres: Progressive house
- Occupation(s): DJ; Record producer
- Years active: 1989–present
- Labels: Acute Recordings
- Website: www.jasonjollins.com

Jason Jollins (born in New York City) is an American DJ and record producer. Initially mixing together freestyle and house music, he has been involved in Progressive House and Techno scene in New York City since the late 1990s.

== Biography ==
In 1997, Jollins formed an event production company called United Underground while he attended college at Rutgers University.

In 2002, Jollins launched his own record label called Acute Recordings which had #1 charted releases on the balance record pool in 2002 and 2003. Also in 2002, Jollins entered three DJ contests and took first place in each competition (Tranceaddict, Global Underground, BPM Magazine (first place Progressive House mix)). In 2005 Acute Recordings had the #1 top selling release on Beatport.

Jollins has held residencies in New York City venues such as Avalon, Centro-Fly, Filter 14, the Roxy, Webster Hall, Spirit (formerly Twilo), Crobar and Love NYC.

Jollins has played alongside artists such as Sasha, Carl Cox, Paul Van Dyk, Steve Lawler, Lee Burridge, Sander Van Doorn, Chris Fortier, Hybrid, ATB, Juan Atkins, Armin Van Buuren, Markus Schulz, Hernan Cattaneo, Above & Beyond, Seb Fontaine, Nu Nrg, Oscar G, Guy Ornadel, Gabriel & Dresden, Anthony Pappa, Darren Emerson, Sander Van Doorn, Ferry Corsten and Max Graham.

In 2008, Jollins coined the term “Tech-Prog” to describe his unique music style, a skillful blending of Progressive House with Techno, Trance and Tech-House elements.

In 2008 and 2009, Jollins co-headlined Creamfields and Ministry of Sound.

Jollins is currently an active artist performing internationally on a regular basis while also performing regularly for Made Event and Pacha New York.

Jason Jollins performing at Pacha Buenos Aires

== Discography ==
=== Singles ===
- 2007: Jason Jollins - "Rosario Sun" - (Acute Recordings)
- 2008: Jason Jollins - "Vision Quest" - (Acute Recordings)
- 2008: Jason Jollins - "We March Together" - (Acute Recordings)
- 2008: Jason Jollins - "Times of Essence" - (Acute Recordings)
- 2008: Jason Jollins - "Flash Future" - (Acute Recordings)
- 2011: Jason Jollins - "Digital Rain" - (Sonido Local Recordings)
- 2011: Jason Jollins - "Ode to Black" - (Acute Recordings)

=== Remixes ===
- 2006: Spex - "Magix" (Jason Jollins Remix) - (Acute Recordings)
- 2007: Thee-O - "Wave Front" (Jason Jollins Remix) - (Acute Recordings)
- 2007: Eiad Sayegh & Anders Odman - "Unite" - (Jason Jollins Remix) (Resurgent Records)
- 2007: Mikel Curcio - "In Your Head featuring Daniella" (Jason Jollins Remix) - (London Music)
- 2007: Marcelo Vasami - "Secrets" Jason Jollins & John Wayyne Remix - (Acute Recordings)
