= Maschine =

Hybrid hardware/software digital audio workstation by Native Instruments

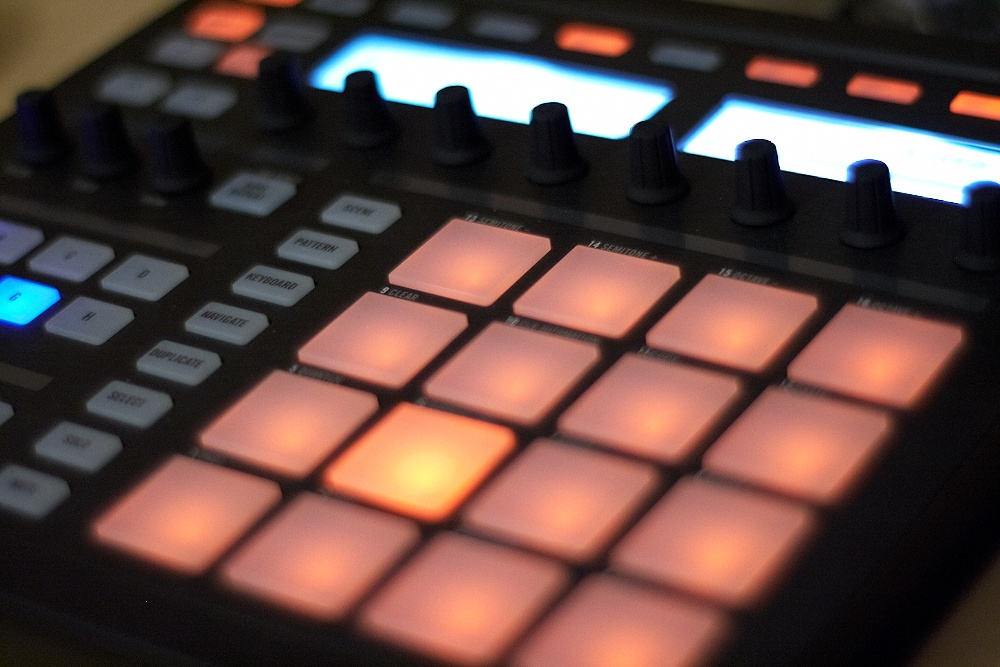

Maschine (German for machine) is a hardware/software digital audio workstation developed by Native Instruments. Maschine consists of a controller that connects to the included sequencing software, which can be installed on any compatible computer or laptop.

== Hardware ==
The Maschine controller is designed like a drum machine, similar to products like the Akai MPC. The controller is powered and connected by USB, with each variation featuring 16 pressure sensitive pads and back-lit buttons. The hardware is not limited for sole use with the Maschine software, but is also compatible with Native Instruments' Traktor DJ software, and music production software such as Ableton Live and FL Studio. There are currently 8 different hardware variations:

- Maschine Mk1: The original Maschine featured 16 pressure sensitive pads, 11 rotary knobs, 2 LCD screens, and 41 buttons. Alongside the USB connection, Maschine also featured a MIDI input and output to connect to compatible gear externally.
- Maschine Mikro Mk1: Introduced as a lower-priced and more portable option in the Maschine product family, Maschine Mikro featured 16 pressure sensitive pads, a single LCD screen, a single knob, and 28 buttons. Mikro also lacked Maschine's built in MIDI connectivity.
- Maschine Mk2: Nearly identical to its predecessor, the Mk2 version of Maschine added upgraded pads and RGB backlighting for all of its buttons. Additionally, 3 knobs related to volume, tempo, and swing were replaced with a single jog wheel and 6 buttons. Maschine Mk2 was available in either black or white, and features a removable magnetic top-plate and knobs for further color customization.
- Maschine Mikro Mk2: The Mk2 configuration of Maschine Mikro featured upgraded pads and RGB backlighting. The hardware layout was unchanged from the previous model, and was available in either black or white.
- Maschine Studio: Maschine Studio was introduced as the premium edition of the hardware. Maschine Studio features 16 pressure-sensitive pads, RGB backlighting, 9 rotary knobs, 2 color LCD screens, 2 sliders, a jog wheel, and 66 buttons. The controller also features dual MIDI inputs and outputs, 2 foot switch inputs, and an input for a 15v power supply, as USB power is insufficient.
- Maschine Jam: Introduced in 2016, Maschine Jam utilized a new 8x8 grid of pads for better step sequencing control. Maschine Jam also features 8 touch strips that can be used for effects.
- Maschine Mk3: The Mk3 version of Maschine added larger and more sensitive pads, more and bigger click buttons, its own sound card, better navigation, dual colored LCD screens, and the best features of the Maschine Studio in a compact package.
- Maschine Mikro Mk3: The Mk3 of Maschine Mikro is the smallest version of Maschine to date and features a smaller LCD screen than older versions, but now includes a touch strip for effects and the upgraded pads from the Maschine Mk3.
- Maschine+: Introduced in September 2020, Maschine + is a standalone version of Maschine that doesn't need to be plugged to a computer. The hardware features WiFi capabilities to exchange sounds and files with a computer. It can also work with the usual Maschine software, which will be updated to a new version allowing the addition of clips on a linear timeline.

== Software ==
The Maschine software is designed to be used as a standalone production studio, or utilized as a plugin within a digital audio workstation. The software is primarily based on drum sequencing and designed for use with the Maschine line of hardware controllers. Users assign drum kits, instruments, and sounds from the included library to each of the controller's 16 pads, and can manipulate sounds further by applying effects and plugins. The software also includes tools to capture and manipulate audio samples in real-time. All functions can be performed without the use of a mouse, and instead directly from the hardware itself. The 2.0 version of the software added multi-core CPU support, a new audio engine, the removal of plugin limits, and other upgrades to UI and audio effects.

Maschine was also ported and simplified into an iOS app called iMaschine. Users use the touch screen to manipulate a virtual recreation of the 16 pads found on the Maschine controller. With the release of iMaschine 2, the app features many of the features found on the full production suite, such as step sequencing, arrangement, and the ability to record and manipulate samples. iMaschine 2 on the iPhone 6s line of phones also utilizes the phone's 3D touch capabilities.

== History ==
Maschine was first released on April 1, 2009, in a package that contained the original iteration of the hardware controller and Maschine software 1.0.

On October 1, 2011, Native Instruments released Maschine Mikro, a budget oriented version of the hardware controller, but with the updated Maschine 1.7 software. That same year iMaschine was also released, an iOS app which brought key features of both the software and hardware components to the mobile platform.

A year later, on October 1, 2012, updated iterations of the controllers, Maschine Mk2 and Maschine Mikro Mk2, were both released alongside Maschine 1.8 software. The software came bundled with a copy of Native Instruments' Massive, a synthesizer plugin.

On November 1, 2013, Native Instruments released Maschine Studio, a premium version of the hardware controller, bundled with Maschine 2.0 software.

On November 12, 2015, iMaschine 2 was released for iOS, designed as the successor to the original app.

Maschine Jam was released on September 29, 2016, bringing grid based sequencing to the Maschine workflow much like the Ableton Push controller.

Maschine MK3 was announced on September 7, 2017, and was released on October 5, 2017. The updated Maschine includes two colour screens, a built-in audio interface, and larger drum pads than its predecessor.

== Expansions ==
A selling point of Native Instruments' Maschine is the release of official expansions for the software's digital library on an ongoing basis. Expansions are generally geared toward a specific genre of music, often containing several different virtual drum kits and instruments. The latest expansions also include presets for the Massive and Monark synthesizers, both of which are created and distributed by Native Instruments. As well, many of the expansions have been released for the iMaschine and iMaschine 2 iOS apps, albeit streamlined for use on the mobile platform.

== List of Maschine Expansions ==
1. Acoustic Drums
2. Amplified Funk
3. Anima Ascent
4. Aquarius Earth
5. Arcane Attic
6. Astral Flutter
7. Backyard Jams
8. Basement Era
9. Bazzazian
10. Black Arc
11. Body Mechanik
12. Borough Chops
13. Brass N Bounce
14. Bumpin Flava
15. Burnt Hues
16. Byte Riot
17. Carbon Decay
18. Cavern Floor
19. Certified Gold
20. Circuit Halo
21. Conant Gardens
22. Concrete Sun
23. Crate Cuts
24. Crystal Daggers
25. Dark Pressure
26. Decoded Forms
27. Deep Matter
28. District Xeo
29. Dj Khalil
30. Drift Theory
31. Drop Squad
32. Drum State
33. Echo Versions
34. Elastic Thump
35. Electric Touch
36. Electric Vice
37. Faded Reels
38. Free Form
39. Global Shake
40. Golden Kingdom
41. Grey Forge
42. Halcyon Sky
43. Hazy Days
44. Headland Flow
45. Helios Ray
46. Hexagon Highway
47. Higher Place
48. Hot List
49. Ignition Code
50. Indigo Dust
51. Infamous Flow
52. Infinite Escape
53. Jersey Ride
54. Lazer Dice
55. Liquid Energy
56. Lo-Fi Vibes
57. Lockdown Grind
58. London Grit
59. Lone Forest
60. Lucid Mission
61. Lunar Echoes
62. Magnate Hustle
63. Magnetic Coast
64. Marble Rims
65. Maschine Central
66. Meteoric Rise
67. Midnight Sunset
68. Molten Veil
69. Mother Board
70. Motor Impact
71. Neo Boogie
72. Neon Drive
73. Nocturnal State
74. Opaline Drift
75. Paradise Rinse
76. Platinum Bounce
77. Polar Flare
78. Prismatic Bliss
79. Prospect Haze
80. Pulswerk
81. Pure Drip
82. Queensbridge Story
83. Radiant Horizon
84. Rare Vibrations
85. Raw Voltage
86. Resonant Blaze
87. Rhythm Source
88. Rising Crescent
89. Rolling Tides
90. Sacred Futures
91. Sasha
92. Satin Looks
93. Sierra Grove
94. Solar Breeze
95. Soul Magic
96. Spectrum Quake
97. Stadium Flex
98. Static Friction
99. Street Swarm
100. System Clash
101. The Stereotypes
102. Timeless Glow
103. Transistor Punch
104. Trill Rays
105. True School
106. Velvet Bloom
107. Velvet Lounge
108. Vintage Heat
109. Void Eclipse
110. Warped Symmetry
111. Young Phantom
112. Zona Ritmo
