= Native Instruments =

German software company

Native Instruments, GmbH
- Type: GmbH
- Industry: Music technology; Music software; Music equipment; Professional audio
- Founded: 1996; 30 years ago in Berlin, Germany
- Founders: Stephan Schmitt; Volker Hinz
- Headquarters: Berlin, Germany
- Area served: Worldwide
- Key people: Constantin Köhncke (CEO); Robert Linke (President)
- Products: Akoustik Piano; Guitar Rig; Kontakt; Maschine; Reaktor; Traktor
- Revenue: ▼79,900,000 Euro; million (2021)
- Number of employees: 500
- Parent: Francisco Partners (formerly); Soundwide (2022 – 2023); inMusic Brands (2026 – present)
- Website: www.native-instruments.com

Native Instruments is a German company that develops, manufactures, and supplies music software and hardware for music production, sound design, performance, and DJing. The company's corporate headquarters and main development facilities are located in Berlin, with additional offices in Los Angeles, Tokyo, London, Paris, and Shenzhen.

== History ==
Native Instruments as a company was founded in 1999 in Berlin, Germany, where its headquarters are still located. Founders Stephan Schmitt and Volker Hinz began using the name Native Instruments in 1996, when they developed Generator, a modular synth software package (which would later form the foundations for their ongoing product, Reaktor).

Following the release of Generator, the company's employees expanded to include Bernd Roggendorf (later a founder of Ableton) and Daniel Haver, who later became Native Instruments' CEO.

In 1999, Native Instruments expanded its staff count and moved to its current building in Berlin's Kreuzberg district.

In 2000, the company began creating products for the DJ community, beginning with the first version of their Traktor software. In 2002, they expanded further to include software samplers, in the form of ongoing products Kontakt and Battery.

In September 2004, the company began a partnership with the DJ hardware manufacturing company Stanton Magnetics and with online music store Beatport. 2004 also saw the release of their guitar amplifier and effects pedal emulation software, Guitar Rig. In 2006, Native Instruments restructured into 3 divisions: instruments, DJ, and guitar.

In March 2017, Native Instruments acquired remix-licensing startup MetaPop.

In January 2020, a works council was elected that represents the employees of the Berlin office.

In January 2021, it was reported that private investment firm, Francisco Partners acquired a majority stake in Native Instruments.

Aside from its German offices in Berlin and Langenfeld, Native Instruments now also has offices in Los Angeles, Tokyo, London, Paris, and Shenzhen.

In April 2022, Native instruments briefly became a subsidiary brand of Soundwide, a parent company created with the backing of Francisco Partners and EMH Partners.

In January 2023, Soundwide laid off 8% of its workforce, citing "challenging market conditions" as the reason. In June of the same year, the Soundwide name was retired and substituted with Native Instruments' own branding, citing familiarity concerns as what led to the change.

On 27 January 2026 it was announced that Native Instruments had entered into preliminary administration proceedings, with the future of the company’s products being uncertain. Native Instruments announced on 8 May of that year that an agreement had been reached for inMusic Brands to acquire the company.

== Products ==
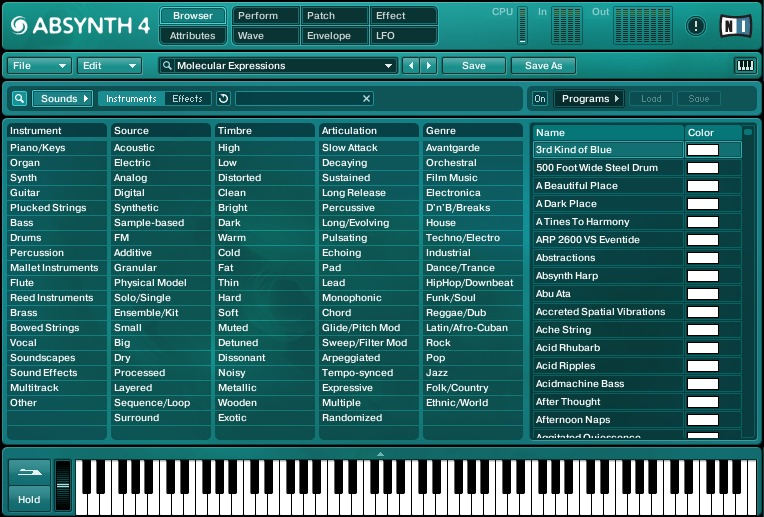
Absynth 4

=== Software ===
Software produced by Native Instruments includes the following:

- Reaktor: A visual programming environment based on modules and wires. Several of Native Instruments products were built using Reaktor, including Monark – NI's emulation of the Moog Model D. In addition to the company's own offerings, it also hosts a large collection of community creations on the Reaktor User Library.
- Kontakt: A software sampler with support for users to program their own virtual instruments.
- Guitar Rig: A modular software effect processor, focused on amplifier and effects pedal emulation for guitar.
- Multiple software synthesizers, such as Massive (wavetable-based), Absynth (semi-modular), and FM8 (frequency-modulation-based).
- Traktor: Digital DJ and vinyl emulation software.

Native instruments also produce a number of other sample libraries, virtual instruments and effects processing plug-ins, many of which function through the architecture of Reaktor or Kontakt. Some of these software items are also grouped together in their Komplete software bundle.

The company also develops the Native Kontrol Standard (NKS), a plug-in extension which allows integration with Kontrol and Maschine products (both hardware and software).

=== Hardware ===
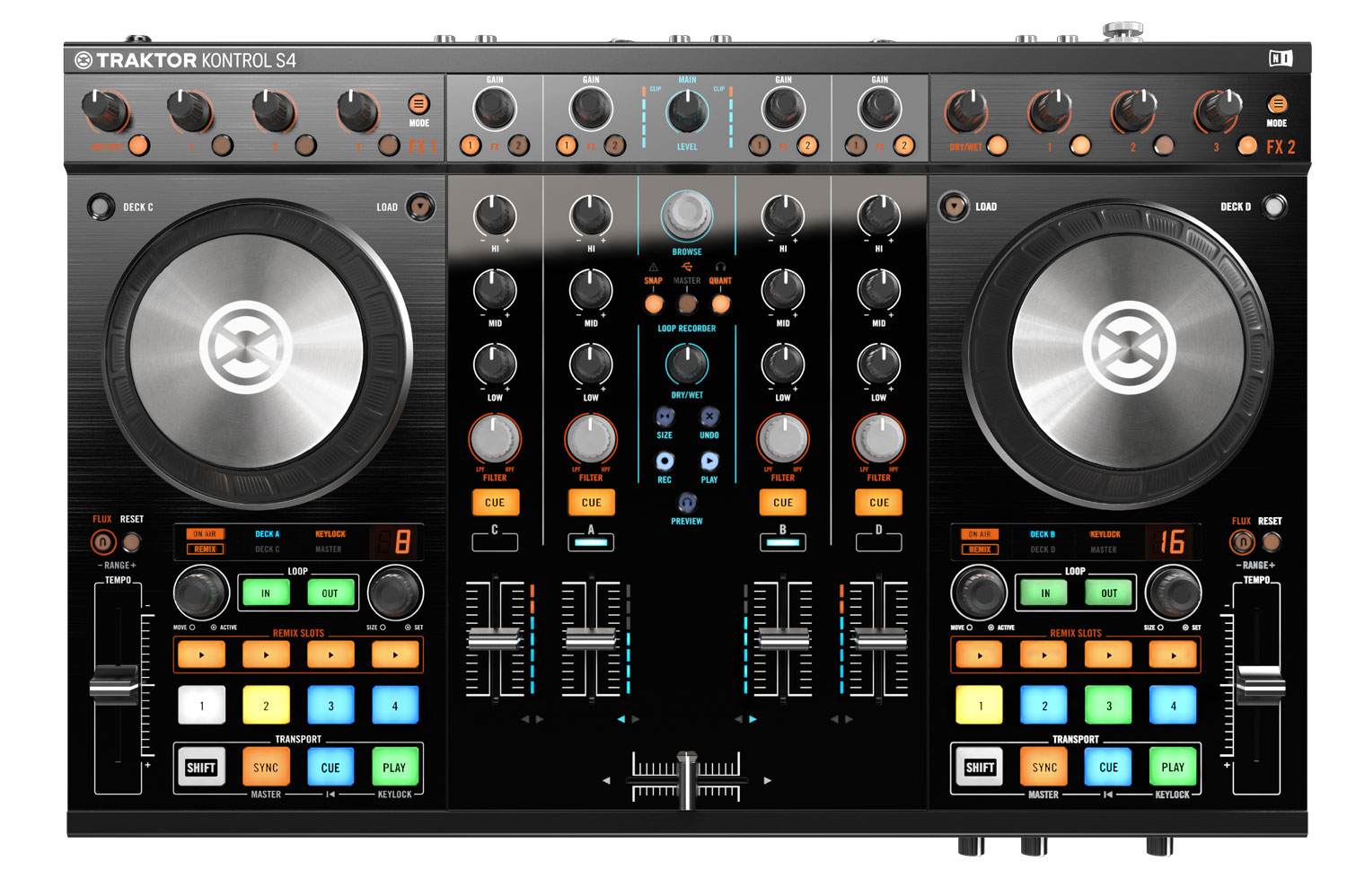
Traktor Kontrol S4 MK2 DJ Controller

Native instruments also produce music hardware, such as:

- Maschine: A system with integrated software for creating drum beats.
- Kontrol: A series of MIDI controllers, audio interfaces and DJ controllers with software instrument support.
