= Guy J =

Israeli musical artist (born 1986)

- Born: Guy Judah; Tel Aviv, Israel
- Genres: House; progressive house; tech house; techno; progressive trance
- Occupations: Record producer; disc jockey; record label owner
- Years active: 2007–present
- Labels: Bedrock Records (Lost & Found), Turbo Recordings; Cocoon Recordings
- Website: https://guy-j.com/

Guy Judah (Hebrew: גיא יהודה; born c. 1986), known by his stage name Guy J, is an Israeli progressive house, techno and electro music producer and DJ who has released three albums and over 15 EPs since 2008. His recordings are noted for their diverse and wide range of musical styles, while his DJ work is known for creating immersive "journey-like" live shows.

In July 2012, he founded the imprint record label Lost & Found, supported by the British DJ and producer John Digweed. Lost & Found serves as a vehicle both for his own work, and for producers he admires, including Sahar Z, Nick Muir, Roy Rosenfeld and Jamie Stevens.

Born in Tel Aviv, as of 2020 he is based in Gozo in Malta.

== Career ==
Guy J began DJing at 15 years, and released his debut album Esperanza in 2007 aged 21, on Digweed's Bedrock label. The album was described by Resident Advisor as a "classy, ethereal blend of progressive house, techno, electro and electronica."

He released his third LP The Trees, The Sea & The Sun in November 2015. Like a number of his earlier EPs, it comprises two separate parts, beginning with an up-tempo techno record side, followed by a series of down-tempo tracks. He has said that the reason for this division is that he writes for the dance floor as well as creating tracks suited to closer listening.

He has also adopted the alias "Cornucopia", under which he released the track “The Day You Got Older And Stronger”, a track used by Hernan Cattaneo to open his set at Burning Man 2015, and remixed Sahar Z and Guy Mantzur's track "Temporary Sanity" in 2016.

== Style ==
Guy J is known for his diverse musical influences and styles. He cites the mixing techniques of Israeli underground techno Guy Gerber and Canadian minimal techno DJ Richie Hawtin as influences, saying "both take you on journey. There are changes, but when you remember it, it feels like one track." Reviewing his 2013 double EP "Seven / Milestone" for Dancing Astronaut, Dan Roy Carter wrote that the release "epitomizes the journey-like stamina of his wide-ranging bodies of musical work".

== Equipment ==
His first synthesizer was a Virus TI, an early virtual analog synthesizer. He still favors, where possible, using analogue equipment over software, describing the sound from analogue as "a bit dirty and warm". He began his career using the Ableton digital audio workstation, and later switched to Traktor. He says that both programs allow him "to loop a lot and [have] some kind of flow in the set." His live sets tend to contain a large number of his own recorded tracks, as he sees himself primarily as a record producer, rather than a DJ.

== Discography ==
=== Albums ===
- Esperanza, 2007, Bedrock Records
- 1000 Words, 2011, Bedrock Records
- The Trees, The Sea & The Sun, November 2015, Bedrock Records
- Cordoba, November 2025.

=== Singles & EPs ===
The following is an incomplete list:

- "Hazui" (with Sahar Z), 2006
- "Resek" (with Ranaa), 2006
- "Esperanza", 2008
- "Shaman", 2009
- "Pleasurety", 2009
- "Shining/1000 Words Remixes"
- "Lost & Found", 2012
- "High/Pathos", 2012
- Soul In Arp", 2012
- "Seven / Milestone", 2013
- "Nirvana", 2015
- "Guy J Remixes", 2016
- "Aurora/Airborne", 2018
- "Day Of Light / Mind Of" (double A-side), 2020, Lost & Found
- "Beast Of Sea", 2020, Lost & Found
