= Guy Mantzur =

Israeli music producer

Guy Mantzur (Hebrew: גיא מנצור) is an Israeli music producer based in Tel Aviv. He established his own record label, Plattenbank, in 2009.

== Musical Career ==
He released his first album, Moments, in 2013, and followed up the following year with Time with Sahar Z. The latter album is described by Decoded Magazine as "distinctly mind blowing on all levels of melodic music".

== Discography ==
=== Albums ===
- Moments, 2013, Sudbeat Music
- Time (with Sahar Z), 2014
- Children With No Name (with Khen), 2016
- A Guy in Itajai, 2018

=== Singles & EPs ===
- "My Golden Cage" (with Khen), Bedrock, 2019
- "Tremolo Man/Chasing the Fog", Lost & Found, 2018
