= Stone in the Water =

Studio album by Stefano Bollani
- Released: September 3, 2009
- Recorded: October 2008
- Studio: Avatar (New York, New York)
- Genre: Jazz
- Length: 61:44
- Label: ECM; ECM 2080
- Producer: Manfred Eicher

Stefano Bollani chronology
Carioca (2008)	Stone in the Water (2009)	Orvieto (2011)

Stone in the Water is an album by pianist Stefano Bollani recorded in October 2008 and released on ECM in September the following year.

== Reception ==
The AllMusic review by Michael G. Nastos awarded the album 3½ stars stating "the music you hear Bollani and his trio creating is pure and serene, far removed from a traditional jazz trio, and approaching new era—not new age—craftsmanship."

Professional ratings
Review scores
Source	Rating
Allmusic	3.5/5 stars

== Track listing ==
All compositions by Stefano Bollani except as indicated

1. "Dom de Iludir" (Caetano Veloso) – 5:54
2. "Orvieto" (Jesper Bodilsen) – 8:01
3. "Edith" (Bodilsen) – 7:29
4. "Brigas Nunca Mais" (Vinicius De Moraes, Antonio Carlos Jobim) – 6:27
5. "Il Cervello del Pavone" – 7:06
6. "Un Sasso Nello Stagno" – 5:52
7. "Improvisation 13 en la Mineur" (Francis Poulenc) – 6:18
8. "Asuda" – 8:13
9. "Joker in the Village" – 6:24

== Personnel ==
- Stefano Bollani – piano
- Jesper Bodilsen – double bass
- Morten Lund – drums
