= Katrine Madsen =

Danish jazz singer (born 1972)

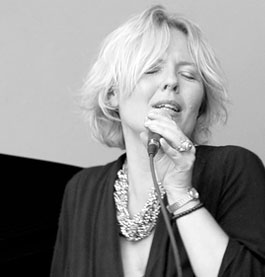

Background information
- Born: 7 March 1972 (age 54); Denmark
- Genre: Jazz
- Occupation: Singer
- Website: https://www.katrine-madsen.dk

Katrine Madsen (born 7 March 1972 in Aarhus, Denmark) is a Danish jazz singer.

== Biography ==
Madsen studied at the Royal Danish Academy of Music and has worked in Copenhagen on albums with transplanted American jazz artists Ed Thigpen and Richard Boone.

In 2002, she founded the Katrine Madsen Sextet and gave their debut concert at the Copenhagen Jazz Festival.

== Discography ==
=== As leader ===
- I'm Old Fashioned (Mecca, 1996)
- Dream Dancing (Mecca, 1997)
- You Are So Beautiful (Mecca, 1998) with Ed Thigpen Trio
- My Secret (Mecca, 2000) quartet feat. Lars Møller
- Magic Night (Mecca, 2002) with Bohuslän Big Band
- Close to You (Stunt, 2004) with Stefano Bollani, Jesper Bodilsen, and Morten Lund
- Supernatural Love (Stunt, 2006) with Ulf Wakenius
- Simple Life (Stunt, 2009) with Joakim Milder, Henrik Gunde Pedersen, Jesper Bodilsen, Jonas Johansen, Morten Lund, and Ole Kibsgaard

=== As guest ===
- 1999: A Tribute to Love (Stunt), with Richard B. Boone
- 2000: Edderkoppen Soundtrack
- 2002: Gershwin & More (Mecca), with Baker Boys
- 2002: Live in Stockholm (Music Mecca), with Svante Thuresson
- 2003: We Are Povo, with POVO
- 2005: Box of Pearls (Stunt), with Svante Thuresson
