= Paolo Benvegnù =

Italian singer (1943–2024)

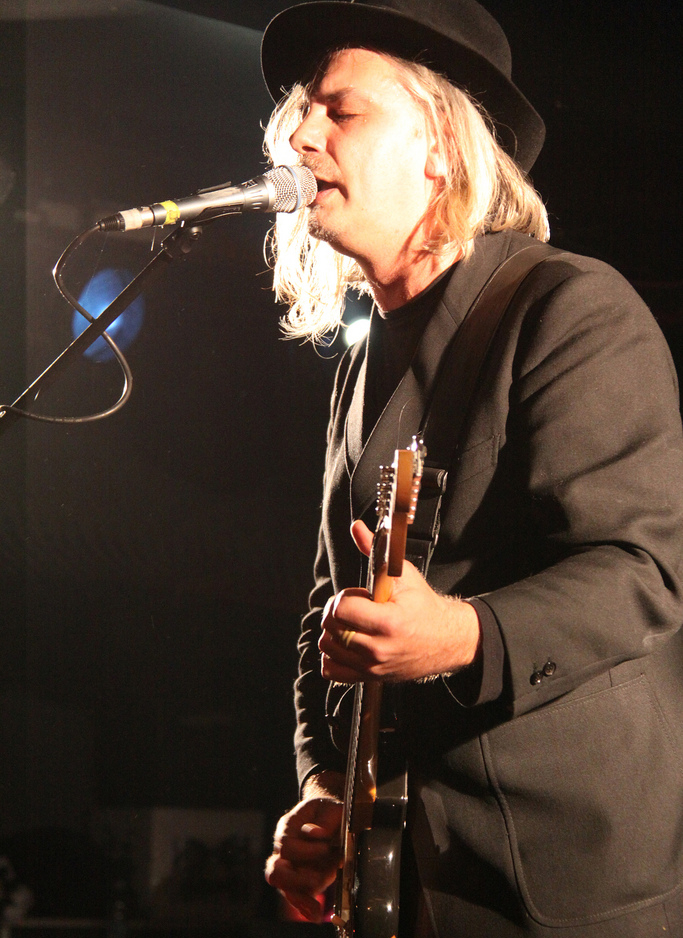
- Benvegnù in 2011
- Born: 14 February 1965; Milan, Italy
- Died: 31 December 2024 (aged 59); Toscolano Maderno, Italy
- Occupations: singer; songwriter

Paolo Benvegnù (14 February 1965 – 31 December 2024) was an Italian singer-songwriter, whose career spanned over thirty years.

== Life and career ==
Born in Milan, Benvegnù made his professional debut in 1993 with the alternative rock band Scisma, with whom he released three albums between 1995 and 1999. He made his solo debut in 2004 with the album Piccoli fragilissimi film.

During his career Benvegnù got eight nominations at Targa Tenco, winning the prize for best album in 2024 for È inutile parlare d'amore. His style has been described as "feverish, disorienting, capable of sublime lightness and dizzying dives, pointing straight at the darkest side of himself, laying bare the restlessness, contradictions and ultimate essence of our contemporary". He has also been active as an actor, a producer, and a composer for other artists, notably Mina, Marina Rei and Irene Grandi. He made his last appearance on 30 December 2024, in Via Dei Matti n°0, a Rai 3 show hosted by Stefano Bollani and Valentina Cenni. He died from a heart attack the next day, at his home on Lake Garda, at the age of 59.

== Discography ==
=== Studio albums ===
- 2004 – Piccoli fragilissimi film
- 2008 – Le labbra
- 2011 – Hermann
- 2014 – Earth Hotel
- 2017 – H3+
- 2020 – Dell'odio dell'innocenza
- 2021 – Delle inutili premonizioni
- 2022 – Delle inutili premonizioni – Vol. 2
- 2024 – È inutile parlare d'amore
- 2024 – Piccoli fragilissimi film – Reloaded

=== EP ===
- 2005 – Cerchi nell'acqua
- 2007 – 14–19
- 2009 – 500
- 2023 – Solo fiori

=== Live albums ===
- 2010 – Dissolution
