= Valentina Cenni =

Italian actress (born 1982)

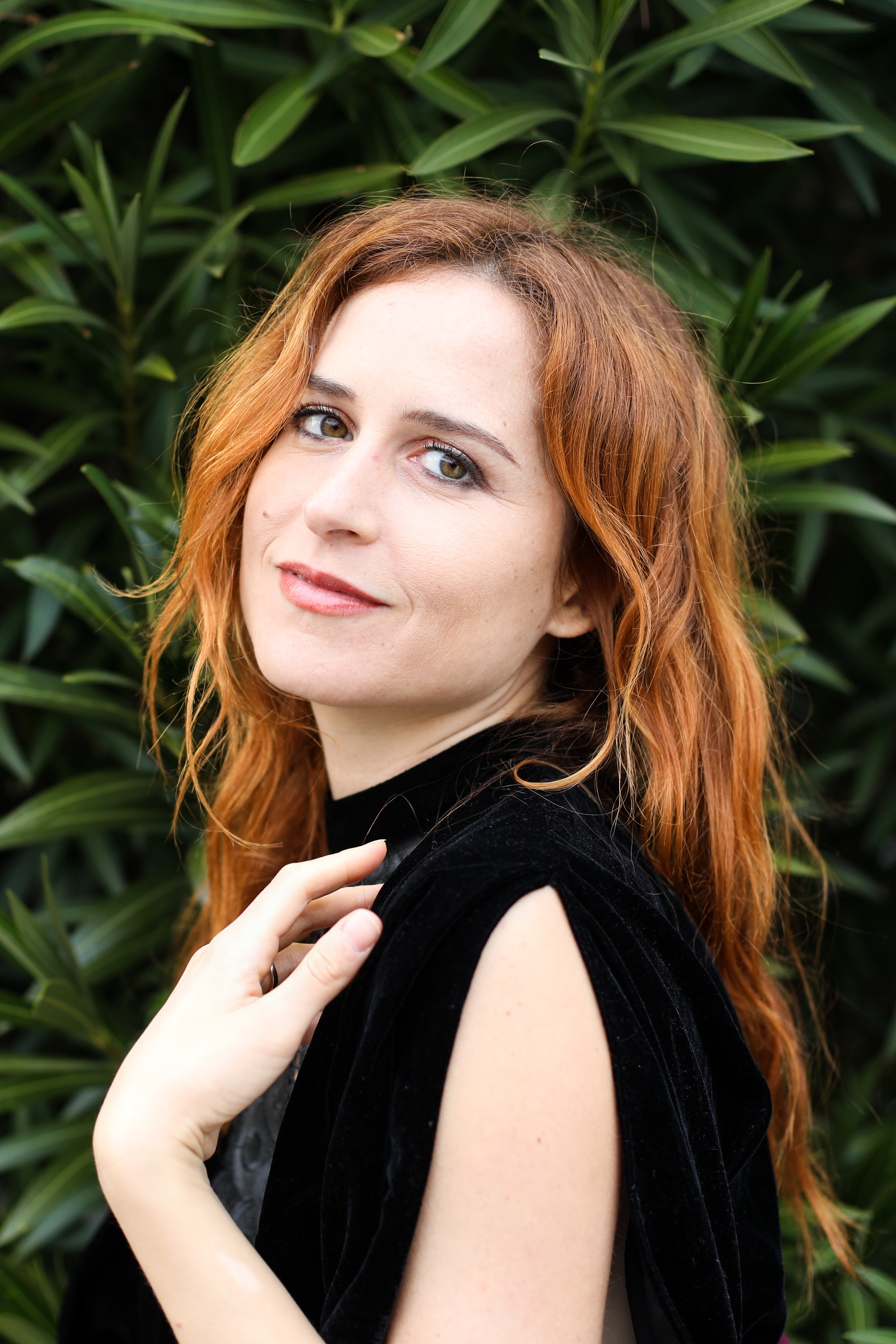
- Valentina Cenni in 2020
- Born: 14 March 1982 (age 43); Riccione, Italy
- Occupations: actress; artist

Valentina Cenni (born 14 March 1982) is an Italian artist and actress.

== Early life and education ==
Valentina Cenni was born in Riccione, Italy, and graduated at Rome's National Academy of Arts and London's Royal Academy of Dance. After completing her studies, she began working as an actress.

== Theatre ==
On stage she was directed by Fausto Paravidino in Harold Pinter's The Birthday Party, and played Roxane in Cyrano de Bergerac and Desdemona in Othello, directed respectively by Alessandro Preziosi and Luigi Lo Cascio. Cenni also performed at the Greek Theatre of Syracuse in Cristina Pezzoli's version of Sophocles' Antigone, and starred as Clementina in Aggiungi un posto a tavola, singing and dancing in Garinei and Giovannini's successful musical comedy. In 2016, she received the Vincenzo Cerami Award as Best Young Actress for her role in Giampiero Rappa's play Nessun luogo è lontano. During the same year, she toured with La Regina Dada, a show she co-wrote, directed and performed with Stefano Bollani.

== Television ==
With the Italian pianist and composer, Cenni also collaborated on other projects, directing the music video for Bollani's song Arrivano gli alieni, as well as contributing to his Rai 1 TV show L'importante è avere un piano with the creation of the 7-short-story series La fata del sonno. On television, she starred in Letizia Russo's drama Babele and acted in Giuseppe Gagliardi's series Non uccidere, both aired on Rai 3. Her cinema roles include Micol in the romantic drama film You Can't Save Yourself Alone, directed by Sergio Castellitto and starring Jasmine Trinca and Riccardo Scamarcio.

== Other works ==
Besides classical ballet and modern dance – disciplines she has been studying for 18 years – her interests include several other arts. As a fire dancer, Cenni performs in the duo I fuochi di Bach, established in 2013 with cellist Enrico Melozzi. And as a photographer, she provided cover pictures for books published by Mondadori and albums released by ECM and Universal.

== Plays ==
- Amata mia, written and directed by Giancarlo Sepe, starring Lina Sastri (2005)
- La saga dei Malatesti, written and directed by Eugenio Allegri (2006)
- Canterbury mesék (freely adapted from The Canterbury Tales by Geoffrey Chaucer), directed by István K. Szabó, Hungarian production (2006)
- Moi aussi je suis Catherine Deneuve (Anche io, je suis Catherine Deneuve) by Pierre Notte, directed by Reza Keradman (2007)
- Camere da letto e... altri luoghi, directed by Massimiliano Farau (2007)
- The Kitchen (La cucina) by Arnold Wesker, directed by Armando Pugliese (2007)
- The Birthday Party (Il compleanno) by Harold Pinter, directed by Fausto Paravidino, starring Giuseppe Battiston (2008)
- Dopo le prove (freely adapted from After the Rehearsal by Ingmar Bergman), directed by Reza Keradman (2008)
- Sexual Perversity in Chicago (Perversioni sessuali a Chicago) by David Mamet, directed by Massimiliano Farau (2008)
- Prenditi cura di me, written and directed by Giampiero Rappa, starring Filippo Dini (2009)
- Il laureato (freely adapted from The Graduate by Mike Nichols), directed by Teodoro Cassano, starring Giuliana De Sio (2009)
- Aggiungi un posto a tavola by Garinei and Giovannini, directed by Johnny Dorelli (2009–2011)
- A Midsummer Night's Dream (Sogno di una notte di mezza estate) by William Shakespeare, directed by Andrea Battistini (2011)
- Cyrano de Bergerac by Edmond Rostand, directed by Alessandro Preziosi (2012)
- Antigone by Sophocles, directed by Cristina Pezzoli, starring Isa Danieli and Maurizio Donadoni (2013)
- Othello (freely adapted from Shakespeare's), directed by Luigi Lo Cascio (2013–2015)
- La Regina Dada, co-written and co-directed by Stefano Bollani and Valentina Cenni (2016)
- Nessun luogo è lontano, written and directed by Giampiero Rappa (2016)

== Filmography ==
- Il produttore, short film by Gabriele Mainetti (2005)
- N. variazioni, short film by Andrea Bezziccheri (2005)
- Circo nudo, documentary film by Andrea Bezziccheri (2006)
- Io... donna, short film by Pino Quartullo (2012)
- You Can't Save Yourself Alone (Nessuno si salva da solo), directed by Sergio Castellitto, starring Jasmine Trinca and Riccardo Scamarcio (2015)
- Respiri, directed by Alfredo Fiorillo, starring Alessio Boni (2015)
- It's All About Karma, directed by Edoardo Falcone, starring Elio Germano and Fabio De Luigi (2017)
- Tutta Vita (2025)

== Radio and TV ==
- Radiouno Gianvarietà (radio show, Rai Radio 1, 2010) – presenter
- Babele (drama, Rai 3/Rai Educational, 2010) –actress
- Non uccidere (TV series, Rai 3, 2015) – actress
- Arrivano gli alieni (music video, 2015) – director
- L'importante è avere un piano (TV show, Rai 1, 2016) – author and actress

== Photography (book and album covers) ==
- The Platinum Collection, triple album by Stefano Bollani (Universal, 2013)
- Dances and Canons, album by Kate Moore and Saskia Lankhoorn (ECM, 2013)
- Parliamo di musica, book by Stefano Bollani (Mondadori, 2013)
- Joy in Spite of Everything, album by Stefano Bollani, Jesper Bodilsen, Morten Lund, Mark Turner, Bill Frisell (ECM, 2014)
- Sheik Yer Zappa, album by Stefano Bollani (Universal, 2014)
- Il monello, il guru e l'alchimista e altre storie di musicisti, book by Stefano Bollani (Mondadori, 2015)
- Arrivano gli alieni, album di Stefano Bollani (Decca, 2015)
- Napoli Trip, album by Stefano Bollani (Decca, 2016)
