= Darkness (2019 film) =

- Film poster
- Italian: Buio
- Directed by: Emanuela Rossi
- Written by: Emanuela Rossi; Claudio Corbucci
- Produced by: Claudio Corbucci
- Starring: Denise Tantucci; Valerio Binasco; Gaia Bocci; Olimpia Tosatto; Elettra Mallaby; Francesco Genovese
- Cinematography: Marco Graziaplena
- Music by: Corrado Carosio; Pierangelo Fornaro
- Production company: Courier Film
- Distributed by: Artex Film, Courier Film
- Release dates: 20 October 2019 (Alice nella Città); 7 May 2020 (Italy)
- Running time: 97 minutes
- Country: Italy
- Language: Italian

Darkness (Italian: Buio) is a 2019 Italian feature film directed by Emanuela Rossi and starring Denise Tantucci and Valerio Binasco.

== Cast ==
- Denise Tantucci as Stella
- Valerio Binasco as father
- Gaia Bocci as Luce
- Olimpia Tosatto as Aria
- Elettra Mallaby as mother
- Francesco Genovese as Marco

== Release ==
The film was released on May 7, 2020 on the platform Mymovies.it.

== Reception ==
Darkness received the Nastro d'Argento for Best Screenplay in 2020, and Rossi received a nomination for Best Original Story.
