= I Visionari =

I Visionari may refer to:

- The Visionaries (film)
- I Visionari (album)
