= Leopardi (film) =

2014 Italian drama film

- Film poster
- Directed by: Mario Martone
- Written by: Mario Martone; Ippolita Di Majo
- Produced by: Carlo Degli Esposti; Nicola Serra
- Starring: Elio Germano; Michele Riondino; Massimo Popolizio; Anna Mouglalis; Valerio Binasco; Paolo Graziosi; Iaia Forte; Isabella Ragonese
- Cinematography: Renato Berta
- Edited by: Jacopo Quadri
- Music by: Apparat
- Distributed by: 01 Distribution
- Release dates: 1 September 2014 (Venice); 16 October 2014 (Italy)
- Running time: 137 minutes
- Country: Italy
- Languages: Italian; Neapolitan

Leopardi (Italian: Il giovane favoloso) is a 2014 Italian biographical drama film directed by Mario Martone. It was selected to compete for the Golden Lion at the 71st Venice International Film Festival. It was also screened in the Contemporary World Cinema section at the 2014 Toronto International Film Festival.

== Plot ==
The film tells the story of the short life of the great Italian poet Giacomo Leopardi. He was a noble, born in Recanati, and soon began to study Latin, Greek, Hebrew, Aramaic and English in the rich library of his palace that his father built. Giacomo, however, possessing an inquisitive, restless spirit, would like to travel abroad to widen his views and enrich his knowledge, as was usual for European landed gentry in the 19th century, though this desire is at odds with his parents (even if his father had a sensibility akin to his, he is too bound by the social conventions and the expectations tied to his role as pater familias; his mother, on the other hand, is too busy shoring up the household declining fortunes to even care about intellectual aspirations). So the poet begins to write his first works, reflecting on the human condition, coming to the conclusion that unhappiness is a constant factor of human existence, and that in life there is no remedy for this problem. In the 1820s, Leopardi can finally leave his native Recanati, and begin to travel to Rome and Florence where, however, his high expectations of intellectual rewards and public recognition are not achieved. He suffered from repeated instances of unrequited love: that he chiefly felt towards the Countess Fanny Targioni Tozzetti, contributing to Leopardi's negative view of life and human experience. He finally moves to Naples, where a physical affliction results in his premature death.

== Cast ==
- Elio Germano as Giacomo Leopardi
- Isabella Ragonese as Paolina Leopardi
- Anna Mouglalis as Fanny Targioni Tozzetti
- Michele Riondino as Antonio Ranieri
- Massimo Popolizio as Monaldo Leopardi
- Valerio Binasco as Pietro Giordani
- Paolo Graziosi as Carlo Antici
- Iaia Forte as Miss Rosa

== Awards and nominations ==
Awards
Award	Category	Recipients and nominees	Result
71st Venice International Film Festival	Golden Lion	Mario Martone	Nominated
71st Venice International Film Festival	Pasinetti Award for Best Actor	Elio Germano	Won
71st Venice International Film Festival	Young Jury Members of the Vittorio Veneto Film Festival Award for Best Actor	Elio Germano	Won
71st Venice International Film Festival	Piccioni Award	Sascha Ring	Won
71st Venice International Film Festival	Akai Award for Best Actress	Iaia Forte	Won
60th David di Donatello Awards	Best Film	Palomar and Rai Cinema	Nominated
60th David di Donatello Awards	Best Director	Mario Martone	Nominated
60th David di Donatello Awards	Best Script	Mario Martone and Ippolita Di Majo	Nominated
60th David di Donatello Awards	Best Producer	Palomar and Rai Cinema	Nominated
60th David di Donatello Awards	Best Actor	Elio Germano	Won
60th David di Donatello Awards	Best Cinematography	Renato Berta	Nominated
60th David di Donatello Awards	Best Production Design	Giancarlo Muselli	Won
60th David di Donatello Awards	Best Costumes	Ursula Patzak	Won
60th David di Donatello Awards	Best Make-up	Maurizio Silvi	Won
60th David di Donatello Awards	Best Hairstyling	Aldo Signoretti and Alberta Giuliani	Won
60th David di Donatello Awards	Best Editing	Jacopo Quadri	Nominated
60th David di Donatello Awards	Best Score	Sacha Ring	Nominated
60th David di Donatello Awards	Best Visual Effects	Chromatica	Nominated
60th David di Donatello Awards	Youngs' David	Mario Martone	Nominated
