= Jo Baier =

German film director and writer (born 1949)

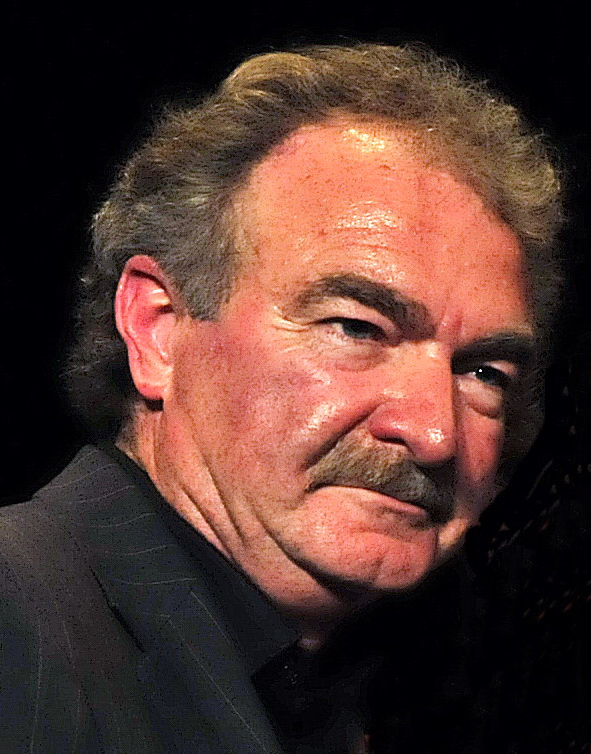
- Born: 13 February 1949 (age 77); Munich, Germany
- Education: LMU Munich
- Occupations: Film director, writer
- Years active: 1982–present

Jo Baier (born 13 February 1949) is a German film director and writer. He directed more than twenty films since 1982 and is known for Operation Valkyrie (2004), Henri 4 (2010) and Not All Were Murderers (2006). He is married to Gertrud Baier.

== Early life and education ==
Baier was born in Munich. He studied drama, German and English at LMU Munich. He graduated with a doctorate in 1980. Since 1979 he has directed primarily television documentaries and dramas.

As he grew up in a Bavarian village, his movies are often influenced by his childhood experiences.

== Awards ==
Baier has received the Grimme-Preis and German Television Award. For Wildfire, his debut as a theatrical director, he was nominated for the German Film Award.

== Selected filmography ==
- Schiefweg (1986, TV film) — (based on stories by Emerenz Meier)
- Rosse (1989, TV film) — (based on a play by Richard Billinger)
- Wildfire (1991, TV film) — (biographical film about Emerenz Meier)
- Hölleisengretl (1995, TV film) — (based on a novel by Oskar Maria Graf)
- Der Laden (1998, TV miniseries) — (based on a novel by Erwin Strittmatter)
- Der Weibsteufel (2000, TV film) — (based on a play by Karl Schönherr)
- Wambo (2001, TV film) — (biographical film about Walter Sedlmayr)
- Verlorenes Land (2002, TV film)
- Swabian Children (2003, TV film) — (based on a novel by Elmar Bereuter about Swabian children)
- Stauffenberg (Operation Valkyrie, 2004, TV film)
- Not All Were Murderers (2006, TV film) — (based on an autobiographical book by Michael Degen)
- Das letzte Stück Himmel (2007, TV film)
- Liesl Karlstadt & Karl Valentin (2008, TV film) — (biographical film about Liesl Karlstadt and Karl Valentin)
- Henri 4 (Henry of Navarre, 2010) — (based on novels by Heinrich Mann)
- The End Is My Beginning (2010) — (based on an autobiographical book by Tiziano Terzani)
- Homecoming (2012, TV film) — (based on a story by Hermann Hesse)
- Bergfried (2016, TV film)
