= Hamilton de Holanda =

Brazilian bandolinist (born 1976)

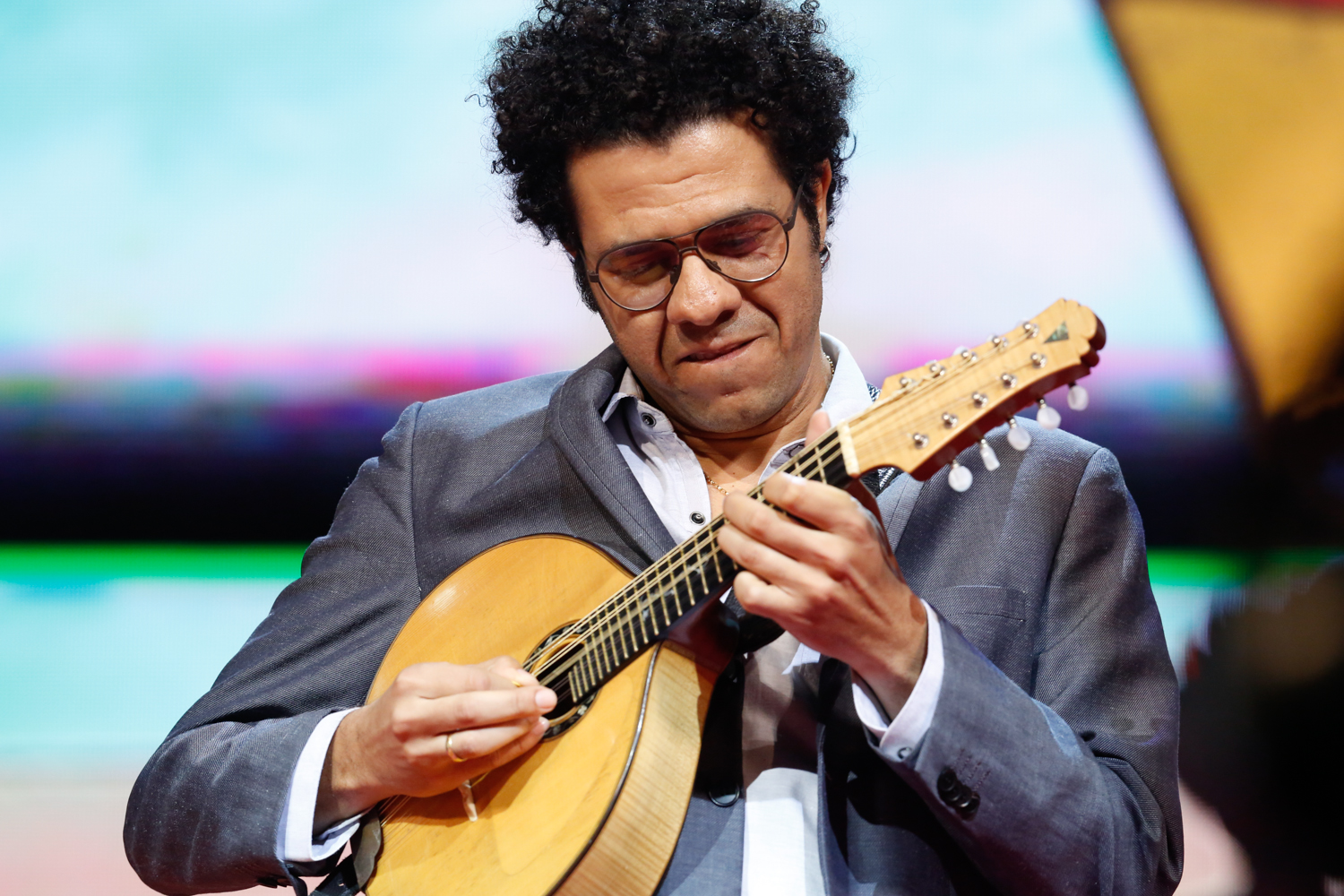
- de Holanda in 2014

Background information
- Born: March 30, 1976 (age 50); Rio de Janeiro, Brazil
- Genres: Choro, jazz, samba,
- Occupations: Songwriter, composer, arranger, instrumentalist
- Instruments: Bandolim
- Years active: 1981–present
- Website: hamiltondeholanda.com
- Influenced by Jacob do Bandolim; Pixinguinha; Armandinho Macedo; Joel Nascimento; João Gilberto; Keith Jarrett; Hermeto Pascoal; Egberto Gismonti; Chick Corea; Milton Nascimento; Pat Metheny; Baden Powell; Raphael Rabello

Hamilton de Holanda Vasconcelos Neto (born March 30, 1976) is a Brazilian bandolinist. He is known for his mixture of choro and contemporary jazz, and for his instrumental virtuosity.

== Biography ==
Born in Rio de Janeiro, he moved to Brasília with his family as a boy. He started playing the bandolin at 5 and appeared at his first performance at six. With his brother Fernando César he formed the group Dois de Ouro. Throughout his career he has collaborated with many other significant artists such as Yamandu Costa, Mike Marshall and Joel Nascimento. He has received several Latin Grammys. He has taught at the Raphael Rabello Choro academy. He plays a custom made 10 string Bandolim.

In 2015, his album Bossa Negra, a partnership with Diogo Nogueira, was nominated for the 16th Latin Grammy Awards in the Best Samba/Pagode Album category. The title track of the album was also nominated for the same award, in the Best Brazilian Song category. In 2016, he was nominated for the Latin Grammys again, this time for Best Instrumental Album, for his Samba de Chico album, which also generated a nomination for Best Engineered Album. In 2017, he received yet another nomination, this time for Producer of the Year. In 2021, he once again had an album nominated for Best Instrumental Album, this time with Canto de Praya - Ao Vivo.

His album Harmonize was considered one of the 25 best Brazilian albums of the first half of 2019 by the São Paulo Association of Art Critics.

== Discography ==
- 1997: with Fernando César Dois de Ouro – Destroçando a Macaxeira
- 1998: with Fernando César Dois de Ouro – A Nova Cara do Velho Choro
- 1999: with Fernando César Dois de Ouro – Dois de Ouro
- 2000: with Marco Pereira – Luz das Cordas
- 2000: with Brasilia Brasil – Brasilia Brasil (Velas)
- 2001: Caravelas – Abre Alas
- 2002: A música de Hamilton de Holanda - compilation
- 2003: Hamilton de Holanda - "Musica das nuvens e do chão" (Velas)
- 2005: "01 Byte 10 Strings" (Brasilianos)- solo
- 2005: "Samba do Avião"- solo
- 2006: Hamilton de Holanda Quintet "Brasilianos 1"- (Brasilianos – Biscoito Fino)
- 2006: with Mike Marshall – New Words / Novas palavras (Brasilianos/Adventure)
- 2007: Íntimo (Brasilianos/ Deckdisk)- solo
- 2007: with André Mehmari – Contínua Amizade (Brasilianos/Deckdisk)
- 2008: Hamilton de Holanda Quintet – Brasilianos 2 (Brasilianos)
- 2009: with Joel Nascimento – De Bandolim a Bandolim (Brasilianos)
- 2009: with Yamandú Costa – Luz da Aurora (Brasilianos)
- 2010: with Ensamble Gurrufío – Sessões com Hamilton de Holanda (Brasilianos)
- 2010: Esperança – Live in Europe- solo (Brasilianos)
- 2010: Hamilton de Holanda Quintet & Orquestra - Brasilianos – Sinfonia Monumental (Brasilianos)
- 2011: with André Mehmari – Gismontipascoal(Brasilianos)
- 2011: Hamilton de Holanda Quintet – Brasilianos 3 (Brasilianos)
- 2013: with Stefano Bollani – O Que Será (ECM)
- 2013: "Mundo de Pixinguinha" - Projeto Natura Musical - CD
- 2014: "Bossa Negra" - com Diogo Nogueira - CD
- 2014: "Pelo Brasil" - CD
- 2014: "Caprichos" - CD
- 2015: "Hamilton de Holanda and Baile do Almeidinha" - CD
- 2015: "Alegria" - With Orquestra do Estado de Mato Grosso - CD
- 2015: "Mundo de Pixinguinha" - DVD
- 2016: "Samba de Chico" - CD
- 2017: "Casa de Bituca" - CD
- 2018: "Jacob 10ZZ" - CD
- 2018: "Jacob Bossa" - CD
- 2018: "Jacob Baby" - CD
- 2018: "Jacob Black" - CD
- 2019: "Harmonize" - CD
- 2020: "Canto da Praya" - Hamilton de Holanda & João Bosco - Digital
- 2020: "Canto da Praya" - Hamilton de Holanda & Mestrinho - Digital
- 2020: "Ao vivo" - Brasília Brasil - Digital - (recorded at April, 2000, Brasília)
- 2022: Chabem - with Chano Domínguez and Rubem Dantas
- 2023: Flying Chicken - with Thiago Rabello and Salomão Soares
- 2023: Samurai (A música de Djavan)
- 2024: Tembla - with C4 Trío
- 2024: "COLLAB" - with Gonzalo Rubalcaba
- 2025: "Hamilton de Holanda Trio - Live in NYC"
- 2026: "NOVA" - with Salomão Soares & Thiago Big Rabello
