= Artex Film =

Italian film company

Artex Film S.r.l.s.
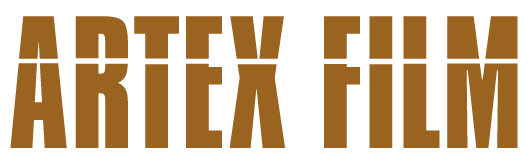
- Company type: Private
- Industry: Motion pictures
- Founded: 2017
- Headquarters: Padua, Veneto, Italy
- Area served: Europe; North America
- Services: Film production; Film distribution
- Website: artexfilm.com

Artex Film is an Italian film production and distribution company founded in 2017.

The company catalogue counts over 100 movies between short and feature films.

== History ==
The company was founded in 2017.

In 2018, Artex Film co-distributes with Venice Film, the feature film Red Land (movie about the dramas of foibe and istrian exodus).

In 2020, due to the COVID-19 crisis, the feature film Darkness, distributed by Artex Film and Courier Film, is the first movie to be released in direct to video on the platform Mymovies.it.

The company participate annually in various markets and festivals including Clermont-Ferrand International Short Film Festival and Marché du Film.

== Partial filmography ==
=== Production ===
Year	Title	Director(s)	Genre	Starring	Notes
Upcoming	Una nuova alba	Ludovico Piccolo	Short	Sandra Ceccarelli, Maria Disegna	

=== Distribution ===
Some feature films distributed by Artex Film:

Year	Title	Director(s)	Genre	Starring	Notes
2018	Red Land	Maximiliano Hernando Bruno	Drama/Historical/War	Selene Gandini, Franco Nero, Geraldine Chaplin, Sandra Ceccarelli, Romeo Grebensek, Vincenzo Bocciarelli, Eleonora Bolla	Co-distribution with Venice Film.
2019	Vajont - Per non dimenticare	Andrea Prandstraller, Nicola Pittarello	Documentary		Co-distribution with Venice Film.
2020	Darkness	Emanuela Rossi	Drama/Thriller	Denise Tantucci, Valerio Binasco, Gaia Bocci, Olimpia Tosatto, Elettra Mallaby, Francesco Genovese	Co-distribution with Courier Film. Nominated for 1 Silver Ribbon: Best Original Story.
2020	The Wheel of Khadi - The Warp and Weft of India	Gaia Ceriana Franchetti	Documentary	Tara Gandhi Bhattacharjee	

Some short films distributed by Artex Film:

Title	Director(s)	Genre	Starring	Notes
Bellissima	Alessandro Capitani	Comedy/Short	Giusy Lodi, Antonio Orefice, Gennaro Cuomo, Emanuele Vicorito, Sabrina Zazzaro, Giuseppe Landolfo	Won 1 David di Donatello: David di Donatello for Best Short Film.
Break the Will	Jonathan Siebel	Drama/Short	Dieterich Gray, Tania Nolan, Caleb Caldwell, Jack Nathan Harding, Chloe Guidry	
Hybrids	Florian Brauch, Matthieu Pujol, Kim Tailhades, Yohan Thireau, Romain Thirion	Animation/Short		Oscar Qualifying prize for the Academy Award for Best Animated Short Film (91st Academy Awards).
Kapitalistis	Pablo Munoz Gomez	Comedy/Short	Georges Siatidis, Wim Willaert, Anne Paulicevich, Nikolaos Sachas	Won 1 César Awards: César Award for Best Short Film.
Life Sucks! But at Least I've Got Elbows	Nicola Piovesan	Animation/Short		Won 1 Silver Ribbon: Best Animated Short Film.
The Long Island Wolf	Julien Lasseur	Thriller/Short	William Leroy, Brian Groh	
Tuck Me In	Ignacio Rodó	Horror/Thriller/Short	Luka Schardan, Mark Schardan	

== See also ==
- Cinema of Italy
