= Denise Tantucci =

Italian actress

- Born: 14 March 1997 (age 29); Fano, Italy
- Occupations: Actress; author
- Years active: 2012–present

Denise Tantucci (born 14 March 1997) is an Italian actress.

== Early life and career ==
Denise was born in Fano to an Italian father and a German mother. She began her career playing the part of Giusy in the fifth season of Provaci ancora prof! and the part of Daphne in the ninth season of Don Matteo. In 2013, she played the character of Giada Spanoi, an Albanian girl looking for her parents who emigrated some time before her, in the ninth season of Un medico in famiglia. It was this series that brought her popularity.

In 2014, she wrote and produced her first show, Un doppio legame, which was staged in September. In the same year, she joined the cast of the second season of Braccialetti rossi and the third of Fuoriclasse. Also, in September, she shot the film What's Your Sign?, directed by Neri Parenti, in cinemas from 11 December 2014.

In 2015, she continued her cinematographic experience, joining the cast of the international film Ben-Hur, a remake of the famous Ben-Hur by William Wyler. In the same year, she returned to the set for the filming of the third season of Braccialetti rossi, during which she participated with her colleagues in the spot against youth discrimination.

== Filmography ==
=== Films ===
Year	Title	Role	Director
2014	What's Your Sign?	Ilaria Fioretti	Neri Parenti
2016	Ben-Hur	Abigail	Timur Bekmambetov
2018	Likemeback	Carla	Leonardo Guerra Seràgnoli
2019	Darkness	Stella	Emanuela Rossi
2020	The Time of Indifference	Carla's Friend	Leonardo Guerra Seràgnoli
2020	Holidays on Mars	Marina	Neri Parenti
2021	Three Floors	Charlotte	Nanni Moretti
2022	The Prince of Rome	Beatrice Cenci	Edoardo Maria Falcone
2022	Our Yesterdays	Greta	Andrea Papini
2022	Io e mio fratello	Sofia	Luca Lucini
TBA	The Lemon Tree	Monika	Bruno Colella
TBA	Kastelruth	Mina	Damiano Giacomelli
TBA	The Blunder	TBA	Alessandra Cardone

=== Television ===
Year	Title	Role	Notes
2013	Provaci ancora prof!	Young girl	Episode: "Il gioco del destino"
2014	Don Matteo	Dafne	Episode: "Cyberbulli"
2014	Un medico in famiglia	Giada Spanoi	Recurring role (season 9); 14 episodes
2015	Fuoriclasse	Mara Ferrero	Main role; 8 episodes
2015–2016	Braccialetti rossi	Nina D'Alessandro	Main role (seasons 2–3); 13 episodes
2017	Sirene	Irene	Main role; 6 episodes
2023	Sei donne - Il mistero di Leila	Alessia	Main role; 6 episodes

=== Music videos ===
Year	Title	Artist(s)	Notes
2013	"Dressed in Blood"	Herself	Music video for her own song
2015	"Il bene si avvera"	Niccolò Agliardi	
2015	"Simili"	Laura Pausini	
