= It's All About Karma =

2017 film

- Directed by: Edoardo Falcone
- Screenplay by: Edoardo Falcone; Marco Martani
- Produced by: Lorenzo Mieli; Mario Gianani
- Starring: Fabio De Luigi; Elio Germano
- Cinematography: Maurizio Calvesi
- Edited by: Luciana Pandolfelli
- Music by: Michele Braga
- Distributed by: 01 Distribution
- Release date: 2017
- Language: Italian

It's All About Karma (Italian: Questione di karma) is a 2017 Italian comedy film co-written and directed by Edoardo Falcone and starring Fabio De Luigi and Elio Germano.

== Cast ==
- Fabio De Luigi as Giacomo Antonelli
- Elio Germano as Mario Pitagora
- Isabella Ragonese as Ginevra
- Stefania Sandrelli as Caterina
- Eros Pagni as Fabrizio
- Daniela Virgilio as Serena
- Massimo De Lorenzo as Ernesto / Dr. Lanzotti
- Valentina Cenni as Alessandra
- Corrado Solari as the antiquarian
- Philippe Leroy as Ludovico Stern

== Production ==
The film was produced by Wildside in collaboration with Rai Cinema. It was shot between Rome and Civita di Bagnoregio.

== Release ==
The film was released on Italian cinemas on 9 March 2017.

== Reception ==
The film grossed $846,581. It received two Globo d'oro nominations, for best comedy film and best cinematography.
