= Orvieto (album) =

Live album by Chick Corea and Stefano Bollani
- Released: September 27, 2011
- Recorded: December 30, 2010
- Venue: Umbria Jazz Winter
- Genre: Jazz
- Length: 74:52
- Label: ECM; ECM 2222
- Producer: Manfred Eicher

Chick Corea chronology
| Forever (2011) | Orvieto (2011) | The Mothership Returns (2012) |

Stefano Bollani chronology
| Stone in the Water (2009) | Orvieto (2011) | O Que Será (2013) |

Orvieto is a live album by pianists Chick Corea and Stefano Bollani recorded in Italy in 2010 and released on the ECM label.

== Reception ==
Professional ratings
Review scores
| Source | Rating |
|---|---|
| AllMusic | 3.5/5 stars |
| The Guardian | 3/5 stars |

The AllMusic review by William Ruhlmann states "the veteran of Hispanic heritage and the younger Italian mix their Southern European flavors on one of the building blocks of American jazz, making for a heady musical concoction that confirms the talents of both". The Guardian's John Fordham noted "Pianists Chick Corea and Stefano Bollani can both play a lot of notes fast and have occasional tendencies to grandstand. But if they're all over each other in the early stages of this Italian concert, later we hear the mutual understanding and assured rhythmic their time together since 2009 has nurtured". All About Jazz correspondent John Kelman observed "Unlike most duo recordings, Bollani and Corea are not split into left and right channels; instead, the two instruments converge towards the center of the mix from lower register to upper, giving Orvieto an even greater "you are there" feeling—but "there" isn't in the audience, it's right up there with the pianists. Those familiar with either player will have no difficulty in identifying them here; for those who aren't, does it really matter? Instead, it makes Orvieto all the more appreciable for its remarkably empathy, telepathy and synchronicity—symmetry, even, at times—less a duo, and more the remarkable melding of musical minds for a most singular purpose".

== Track listing ==
All compositions by Chick Corea and Stefano Bollani except where noted.

1. "Orvieto Improvisation No. 1" - 4:12
2. "Retrato em Branco e Preto" (Chico Buarque, Antônio Carlos Jobim) - 6:17
3. "If I Should Lose You" (Ralph Rainger, Leo Robin) - 4:24
4. "Doralice" (Antonio Almeida, Dorival Caymmi) - 5:42
5. "Jitterbug Waltz" (Fats Waller) - 7:30
6. "A Valsa da Paula" (Bollani) - 6:06
7. "Orvieto Improvisation No. 2/Nardis" (Bollani, Corea/Miles Davis) - 8:45
8. "Este Seu Olhar" (Jobim) - 5:44
9. "Darn That Dream" (Eddie DeLange, Jimmy Van Heusen) - 7:11
10. "Tiritran" (Traditional) - 6:51
11. "Armando's Rhumba" (Corea) - 6:05
12. "Blues in F" - 6:05

== Personnel ==
- Chick Corea – piano
- Stefano Bollani – piano
