= Io e mio fratello =

- Directed by: Luca Lucini
- Written by: Ilaria Storti; Marta Storti
- Starring: Denise Tantucci; Cristiano Caccamo; Greta Ferro
- Cinematography: Manfredo Archinto
- Edited by: Carlotta Cristiani; Matteo Mossi
- Music by: Fabrizio Campanelli
- Release date: 21 April 2023
- Running time: 107 minutes
- Country: Italy
- Language: Italian

Io e mio fratello is a 2023 Italian comedy-drama film directed by Luca Lucini.

The film was released via Amazon Prime Video on 21 April 2023.

== Cast ==
- Denise Tantucci as Sofia Nisticò
- Cristiano Caccamo as Mauro
- Greta Ferro as Michela
- Ninni Bruschetta as Giuseppe
- Claudio Colica as Alessandro Lombardo
- Nino Frassica as Bernardo
- Giovanna Gianolli as Elena
- Paola Lavini as Nadia
- Marco Leonardi as Martino
- Teresa Mannino as aunt Tecla
- Lunetta Savino as Marilena
- Lucia Zotti as Lucia
- Antonia Genga as aunt Teresa
- Marcello Arnone as uncle Tonino
- Ilenia Calabrese as Claudia
- Antonio Centola as Father Marcello
- Natalia Lungu as Alexia
