= The End Is My Beginning =

2010 film by Jo Baier

- Directed by: Jo Baier
- Written by: Folco Terzani; Ulrich Limmer
- Story by: Tiziano Terzani; Folco Terzani
- Produced by: Ulrich Limmer
- Starring: Bruno Ganz; Elio Germano; Erika Pluhar
- Cinematography: Judith Kaufmann
- Music by: Ludovico Einaudi
- Production companies: Bayerischer Rundfunk; Südwestrundfunk; Arte
- Distributed by: Universum Film
- Release date: 2010
- Countries: Germany; Italy
- Languages: German; Italian

The End Is My Beginning (German: Das Ende ist mein Anfang, Italian: La fine è il mio inizio) is a 2010 German-Italian biographical drama film directed by Jo Baier. It is based on the posthumous autobiographical best-seller with the same name written by Tiziano Terzani.

== Cast ==
- Bruno Ganz as Tiziano Terzani
- Elio Germano as Folco Terzani
- Erika Pluhar as Angela Terzani
- Andrea Osvárt as Saskia Terzani
- Nicolò Fitz-William Lay as Novi

== See also ==
- List of German films of the 2010s
- List of Italian films of 2010
