= Claudio Cupellini =

Italian film director and screenwriter

- Born: 18 February 1973 (age 52); Camposampiero, Italy
- Occupation(s): Director, screenwriter
- Years active: 1999–present

Claudio Cupellini (born 18 February 1973) is an Italian film director and screenwriter.

== Biography ==
In 1999, Cupellini realized his first short-movie Le diable au vélo and then took part to two anthology films: Sei pezzi facili and 4-4-2 – Il gioco più bello del mondo.

His first full feature film was Lessons in Chocolate, a light comedy that deals with the issues of job insecurity and integration, starring Violante Placido. His second film, A Quiet Life, for which Cupellini was nominated for the David di Donatello Award for Best Director, was presented at the 2010 Rome Film Festival and gained Toni Servillo the Award for Best Actor. In 2015, Cupellini made his third film, the romantic drama Alaska, starring Àstrid Bergès-Frisbey and Elio Germano.

Together with Stefano Sollima and Francesca Comencini, Cupellini directed some of the episodes of the TV-series Gomorrah.

== Filmography ==
- Lessons in Chocolate (2007)
- A Quiet Life (2010)
- Alaska (2015)
- La terra dei figli (2021)
