= Alaska (2015 film) =

- Directed by: Claudio Cupellini
- Written by: Claudio Cupellini; Filippo Gravino; Guido Iuculano
- Story by: Claudio Cupellini
- Produced by: Donatella Botti
- Starring: Elio Germano; Àstrid Bergès-Frisbey
- Cinematography: Gergely Pohárnok
- Music by: Pasquale Catalano
- Production companies: Indiana Production Company, 2.4.7 Films and Rai Cinema
- Distributed by: 01 Distribution
- Release dates: October 23, 2015 (Rome Film Festival); November 5, 2015
- Running time: 125 minutes
- Countries: Italy; France
- Languages: Italian; French

Alaska is a 2015 drama film written and directed by Claudio Cupellini and starring Elio Germano and Àstrid Bergès-Frisbey. It entered the competition at the Rome Film Festival.

== Plot ==
Alaska is the name of a disco that the young Fausto opens, after a violent life, just released from prison. He is in love with Nadine, a French girl who had a successful period in Milan as a model. However, now she is broke because Fausto used her savings to invest in Alaska behind her back. Fausto opened the disco with Sandro, a man he met through Nadine, and business is good, but Nadine sees her relationship with Fausto destroyed because he took her savings, so she betrays him by sleeping with her boss. Fausto is outraged when he finds out and claims he wants nothing to do with Nadine.

Later on, Fausto is dating Francesca, a woman who comes from a wealthy family. Through her father, Fausto has the opportunity to run an elegant hotel. Sandro felt betrayed by Fausto and he loses all his money from betting, and in despair, kills himself. Fausto then tries to mend his relationship with Nadine, though he plans to marry Francesca and run the hotel chain. Nadine goes away angry, and one day, during a quarrel with her new employer, she kills him, ending up in prison. Fausto apparently ditches Francesca entirely and goes to visit Nadine every week, waiting for the end of her sentence.

== Cast ==
- Elio Germano as Fausto
- Àstrid Bergès-Frisbey as Nadine
- Valerio Binasco as Sandro
- Elena Radonicich as Francesca
- Paolo Pierobon as Marco
- Antoine Oppenheim as Nicolas
- Pino Colizzi as Alfredo Wiel
- Marco D'Amore as Toni
- Roschdy Zem as Benoit
- Anastasia Vinogradova as Eva

== Accolades ==
Year	Award	Category	Recipient	Result
2016	David di Donatello	Best Actress	Àstrid Bergès-Frisbey	Nominated

== See also ==
- List of Italian films of 2015
