= Fallen Heroes (film) =

- Directed by: Paolo Franchi
- Starring: Bruno Todeschini; Elio Germano; Irène Jacob
- Cinematography: Cesare Accetta
- Music by: Martin Wheele
- Release date: 2007
- Country: Italy

Fallen Heroes (Italian: Nessuna qualità agli eroi) is a 2007 Italian crime-drama film directed by Paolo Franchi. It entered the competition at the 64th Venice International Film Festival.

== Cast ==
- Bruno Todeschini as Bruno Ledeux
- Elio Germano as Luca Neri
- Irène Jacob as Anne
- Mimosa Campironi as Elisa
- Maria de Medeiros as Cécile Ledeux
- Paolo Graziosi as Giorgio Neri
- Alexandra Stewart as Bruno's mother

== Production ==
In the sex scene that Elio Germano shot with Mimosa Campironi, the actor's erect member was in reality a prosthesis made especially for Germano by Sergio Stivaletti, already a wizard of make-up and special effects for Dario Argento.
