= O que será =

Live album by Stefano Bollani & Hamilton de Holanda
- Released: August 23, 2013
- Recorded: August 17, 2012
- Venues: Jazz Middelheim; Antwerp, Belgium
- Genre: Jazz
- Length: 53:58
- Label: ECM 2332
- Producer: Manfred Eicher

Stefano Bollani chronology
Orvieto (2011)	O que será (2013)

O que será (Portuguese: "What Will Be") is a live album by Italian pianist Stefano Bollani and Brazilian bandolinist Hamilton de Holanda recorded in Belgium in August 2012 and released on ECM a year later. The album is named after a 1976 Chico Buarque song.

== Reception ==
Professional ratings
Review scores
Source	Rating
Allmusic	4/5 stars
The Guardian	4/5 stars

The AllMusic review by Thom Jurek awarded the album 4 stars stating "O Que Será is a one of a kind dialogue between two musicians who understand that music is an adventure; they submit themselves to it fully with a wealth of ideas and bring out the heat, intimacy, and humor in these tunes."

The Guardian's John Fordham noted "The Italian pianist Bollani and the Brazilian De Holanda, who plays the bandolim (a 10-string mandolin), have worked up a largely South American repertoire of tangos and love songs, variously treating them with dazzling virtuosity, humour and captivating tenderness... This remarkable duo's pleasure in their work is infectious."

All About Jazz correspondent Ian Patterson wrote "The chemistry between Bollani and de Holanda and the almost inexhaustible material at their disposal clamor for a follow-up... O Que Será marks a high point in the discographies of both musicians."

On the same site John Kelman commented "The inclusion of audience reactions throughout the show help make O Que Sera a breathtaking 54-minute break from life's trials and tribulations; as close to being there as any audio recording can be, it's proof positive that serious music can be fun, too."

== Track listing ==
1. "Beatriz" (Chico Buarque, Edú Lobo) - 3:25
2. "Il barbone di Siviglia" (Stefano Bollani) - 6:27
3. "Caprichos de Espanha" (Hamilton de Holanda) - 3:04
4. "Guarda che luna" (Gualtiero Malgoni, Bruno Pallesi) - 6:51
5. "Luiza" (Antônio Carlos Jobim) - 6:17
6. "O que será" (Buarque) - 5:26
7. "Rosa" (Pixinguinha) - 3:36
8. "Canto de Ossanha" (Vinicius de Moraes, Baden Powell) - 8:53
9. "Obilivion" (Astor Piazzolla) - 4:35
10. "Apanhei-te Cavaquinho" (Ernesto Nazareth) - 5:24

== Personnel ==
- Stefano Bollani – piano
- Hamilton de Holanda – bandolin
