= Swabian children =

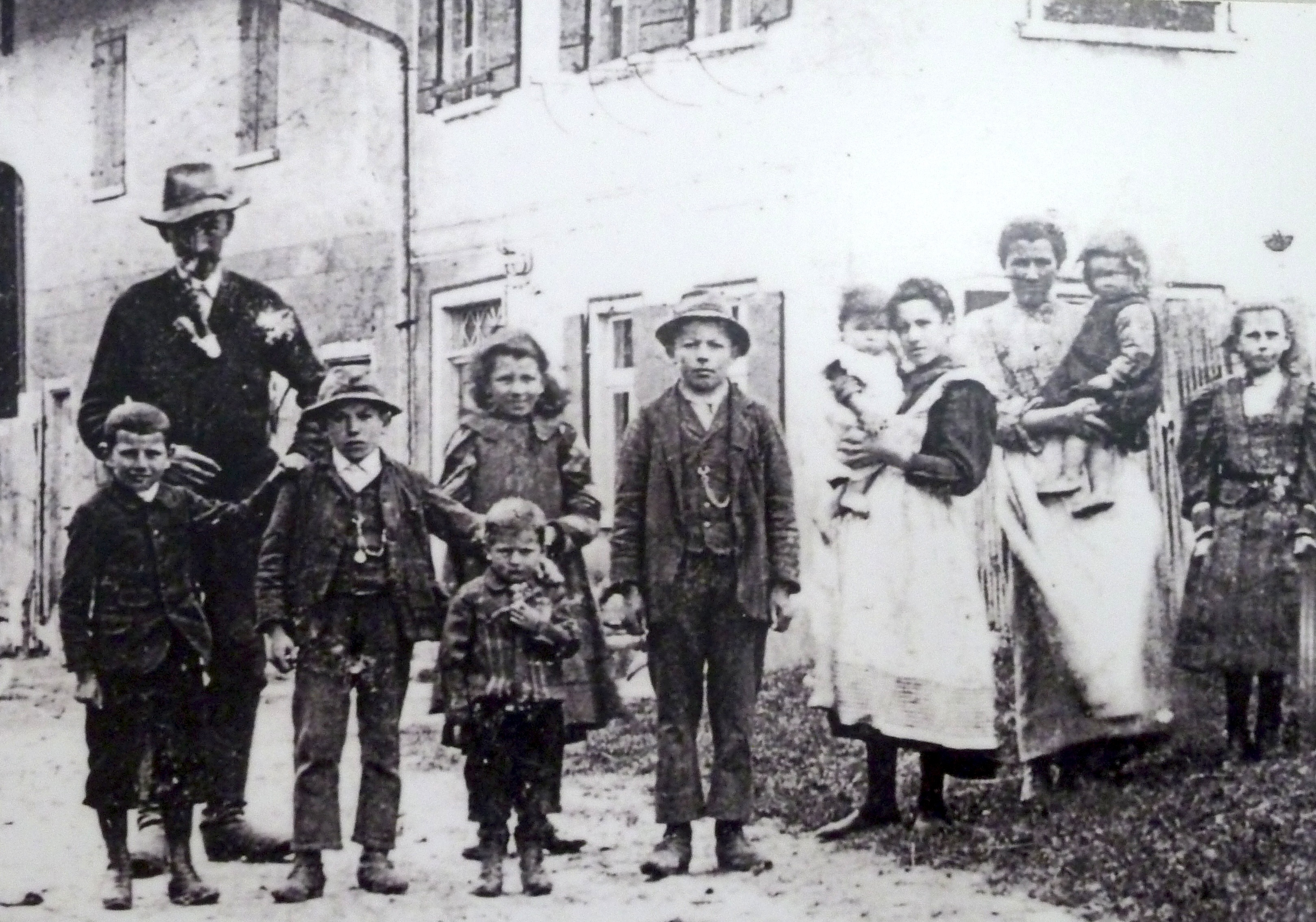
Swabian children from Graubünden at Arnach (1907)

The Swabian children (German: Schwabenkinder) were peasant children from poor families in the Alps of Austria and Switzerland who went to find work on farms in Upper Swabia and the Swabian Jura. Usually they were sent by their parents to become seasonal workers. They were taken in spring and brought to the child markets in Germany, mainly in Upper Swabia, where they would be purchased or "rented" by farmers for the season. This use of children as workers was most widespread in the 19th century.

The march over the Alps to Germany proved often difficult and exhausting. Usually their guide was a priest, who was also responsible for ensuring the children had a warm stable to sleep in.

The Swabian Children Association, run by priests, began organizing the seasonal migration of children in 1891. The marches were large, organised groups of several thousand children, taken over the snow-covered mountains often still dressed in rags. It was not uncommon for five and six-year-old children to be taken.

The American press began a campaign in 1908 exposing the Swabian children, describing the child market in Friedrichshafen as a "barely concealed slave market".

The child markets were abolished in 1915, yet the trade of children did not end completely until compulsory schooling for foreign children was introduced in Württemberg in 1921.

Many immigration certificates from Swabia show surnames typical of Tyrol and other regions the children were taken from (e.g. Braxmeier from Braxmarer).

== Film ==
- Schwabenkinder, TV film (first aired 2003), director: Jo Baier, actors: Tobias Moretti, Vadim Glowna

The movie is based on the novel Die Schwabenkinder – Die Geschichte des Kaspanaze (The Swabian Children – The Story of Kaspanaze) by Elmar Bereuter (ISBN 3-7766-2304-7).

In the movie, after his mother is killed in an avalanche, the farmer boy Kaspar is sent by his struggling father to work in Swabia. Together with other children from the village, their guide (Tobias Moretti) brings the group to the child market at Ravensburg. There the miraculous story begins: The brutal treatment of the boy by the farmer, his escape, emigration to the United States, and final home coming to his village many years later to visit his dying father.
