= Lessons in Chocolate =

- Italian: Lezioni di cioccolato
- Directed by: Claudio Cupellini
- Written by: Fabio Bonifacci; Christian Poli
- Starring: Luca Argentero; Violante Placido; Neri Marcorè; Hassani Shapi
- Cinematography: Giovanni Cavallini
- Edited by: Danilo Torre
- Music by: Teho Teardo
- Production company: Cattleya
- Distributed by: Universal Pictures
- Release date: 23 November 2007
- Running time: 98 minutes
- Country: Italy
- Language: Italian

Lessons in Chocolate (Italian: Lezioni di cioccolato, simply known as Chocolate Lessons) is a 2007 Italian romantic comedy film directed by Claudio Cupellini.

In 2011, a sequel entitled Lezioni di Cioccolato 2 was released by Universal Pictures in Italy, but was never released in the United States.

== Cast ==
- Luca Argentero as Mattia Cavedoni
- Violante Placido as Cecilia Ferri
- Neri Marcorè as Corrado
- Hassani Shapi as Kamal
- Monica Scattini as Letizia
- Francesco Pannofino as Luigi
- Vito as Osvaldo
- Josefia Forlì as Corrado Mineo
- Matteo Oleotto as Milo
- Rolando Ravello as the presenter
- Ivano Marescotti as Giancarlo Ugolini
- Salami Bahija as Shamira
