= Magnificent Presence =

- Film poster
- Italian: Magnifica presenza
- Directed by: Ferzan Özpetek
- Written by: Ferzan Özpetek; Federica Pontremoli
- Produced by: Domenico Procacci
- Starring: Elio Germano; Margherita Buy; Vittoria Puccini; Giuseppe Fiorello; Paola Minaccioni; Cem Yılmaz; Andrea Bosca; Claudia Potenza
- Cinematography: Maurizio Calvesi
- Edited by: Walter Fasano
- Music by: Pasquale Catalano
- Release date: 13 March 2012 (Milan)
- Running time: 105 minutes
- Country: Italy
- Language: Italian

Magnificent Presence (Italian: Magnifica presenza, also known as A Magnificent Haunting) is a 2012 Italian drama film directed by Ferzan Özpetek.

== Plot ==
Pietro Pontechievello is a gay man who rents a large house in the historic center of Rome. In the abode Pietro quickly learns of strange and mysterious presences. The house is haunted by the ghosts of members of a theater company dating back to the times of fascism, and now they do not know they are dead. Indeed, the ghosts believe they are on leave to participate in a new show, and Pietro does not know how to drive the intruders from the building.

== Cast ==
- Andrea Bosca - Luca Veroli
- Margherita Buy - Lea Marni
- Loredana Cannata - Casting
- Giuseppe Fiorello - Filippo Verni
- Elio Germano - Pietro Pontechievello
- Paola Minaccioni - Maria
- Ambrogio Maestri - Ambrogio Dardini
- Anna Proclemer - Livia Morosini
- Vittoria Puccini - Beatrice Marni
- Cem Yılmaz - Yusuf Antep
- Alessandro Roja - Paolo

== Reception ==
Magnificent Presence has an approval rating of 69% on review aggregator website Rotten Tomatoes, based on 13 reviews, and an average rating of 6.3/10.
