= Waldkirchen =

- Town
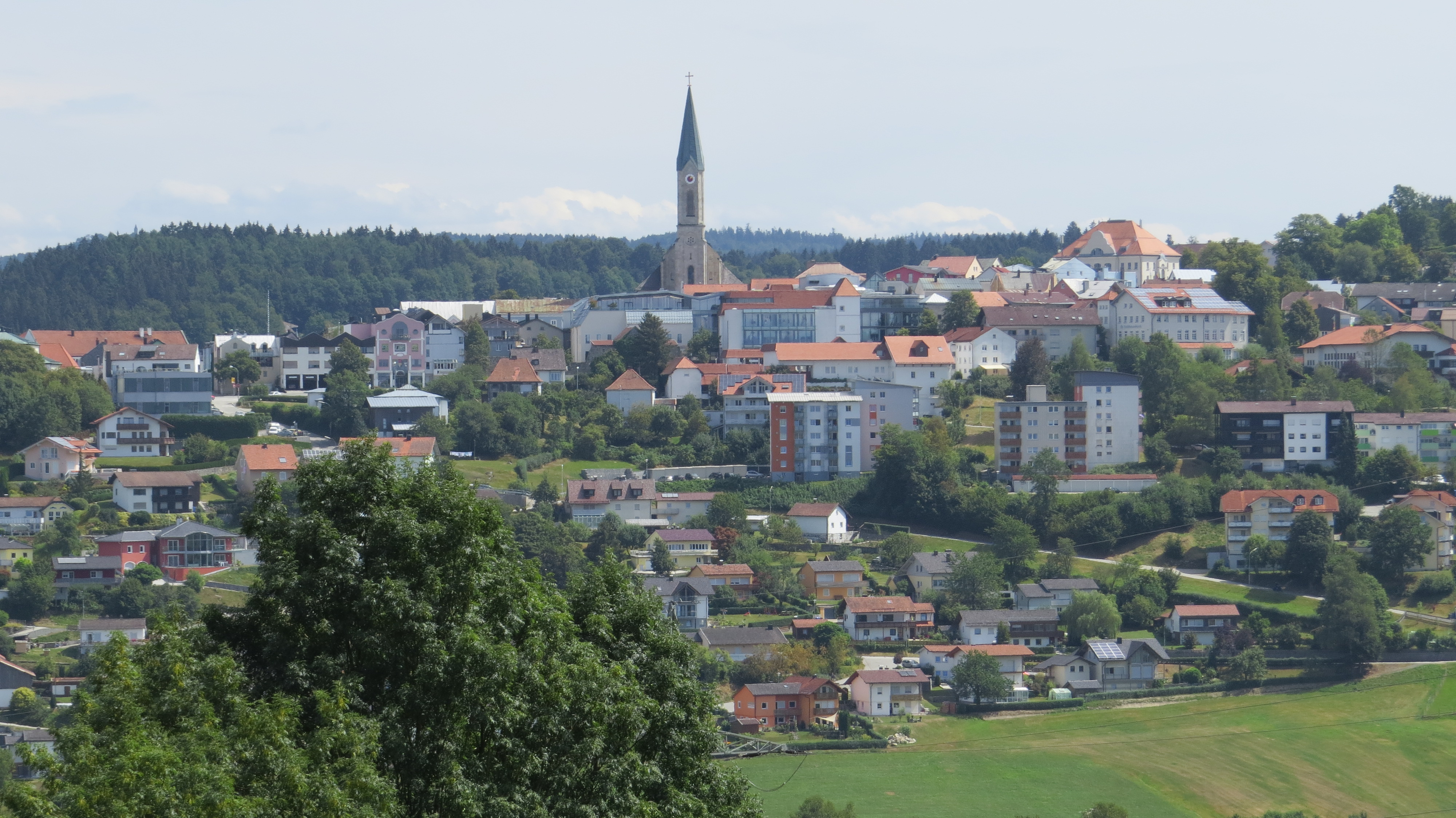
- Waldkirchen seen from the west

- Coat of arms

- Location of Waldkirchen within Freyung-Grafenau district
- Interactive map of Waldkirchen
- Location within Germany Location within Bavaria
- Coordinates: 48°43′49.72″N 13°36′4.1″E
- Country: Germany
- State: Bavaria
- Admin. region: Niederbayern
- District: Freyung-Grafenau

Government
  - Mayor (2020–26): Heinz Pollak

Area
  - Total: 80.06 km^{2} (30.91 sq mi)
- Elevation: 573 m (1,880 ft)

Population (2025-12-31)
  - Total: 11,326
  - Density: 141.5/km^{2} (366.4/sq mi)
- Time zone: UTC+01:00 (CET)
  - Summer (DST): UTC+02:00 (CEST)
- Postal codes: 94065
- Dialling codes: 08581
- Vehicle registration: FRG
- Website: www.waldkirchen.de

Waldkirchen is the biggest town in the district of Freyung-Grafenau in Germany.

== History ==
Waldkirchen township

Mentioned for the first time in 1203, it soon became an important trading place along the "Goldener Steig" (Golden Path), a salt-trading route between Bavaria and Bohemia in the late Middle Ages. In the 13th century the Bishop of Passau gave Waldkirchen the title of a "Markt" (market). After several raids by Bohemian soldiers during the 15th century the city built a "Ringmauer", a big stonewall, to surround it, which is still to be seen in many places of the city.

Belonging to the Bishop of Passau's territory for more than 600 years, the city became part of the Kingdom of Bavaria in 1806 and in 1871 of the German Empire.

Waldkirchen burned down six times between 1492 and 1945. The last fire was on April 26, 1945, when the 16th Company of Regiment Grossdeutschland, SS Panzer Grenadier Division "Das Reich" arrived from St. Pölten, Austria. Each squad of ten men was armed with one light machine gun, one machine pistol, two Panzerfaust and rifles. Eight civilians were killed in combat with the 11th Armored Division, and 48 houses and city's historical church were destroyed. In the course of the action 120 families also lost shelter. The devastated city was rebuilt during the 1950s and was chartered in 1972.

Waldkirchen was host of the 2007 Landesgartenschau.

== Inhabitants ==
- 1979: 8,835
- 1982: 8,882
- 1992: 10,067
- 2005: 10,673 City centre: 3,613 Villages: 7,060

== Religion ==
- Roman Catholics: 89%
- Protestant: 6%
- others: 5%

== Attractions and Tourism ==
City Wall

Attractions in the town include the City Wall, St. Peter's and St. Paul's Churches, the Schratzlgaenge (hidden labyrinth under the town) and the marketplace.

=== Tourism ===
Waldkirchen's main "industry" is tourism. Embedded in the Bavarian Forest, Waldkirchen is close to Prague, Munich and Vienna.

== Famous people ==
- Emerenz Meier, Bavarian writer
