= Piano Solo (Stefano Bollani album) =

Studio album by Stefano Bollani
- Released: 2006
- Recorded: August 2005
- Genre: Jazz
- Length: 68:30
- Label: ECM; ECM 1964
- Producer: Manfred Eicher

Stefano Bollani chronology
I Visionari (2006)	Piano Solo (2006)	Carioca (2008)

Piano Solo is a solo album by Italian pianist Stefano Bollani recorded in August 2005 and released on ECM the following year.

== Reception ==
Professional ratings
Review scores
Source	Rating
AllMusic	4/5 stars
The Penguin Guide to Jazz	3.5/4 stars

The AllMusic review by Richard S. Ginell awarded the album 4 stars stating "Bollani can improvise on Prokofiev, trip along through a Dixieland standard... turn out splendidly intricate paraphrases... He also likes to make improbable associations... For the most part, all of this is filtered through a distinct, poetic, never flashy for its own sake, improvising personality, a lovely touch, and a concise sense of structure."

== Track listing ==
All compositions by Stefano Bollani except as indicated

1. "Antonia" (Antonio Zambrini) – 4:52
2. "Impro I" – 3:12
3. "Impro II" – 3:05
4. "On a Theme by Sergey Prokofiev" – 5:27
5. "For All We Know" (J. Fred Coots, Sam M. Lewis) – 5:46
6. "Promenade" – 4:05
7. "Impro III" – 3:35
8. "A Media Luz" (Edgardo Donato, Carlos Cesar Lenzi) – 4:39
9. "Impro IV" – 3:43
10. "Buzzillare" – 3:11
11. "Do You Know What It Means to Miss New Orleans?" (Louis Alter, Eddie DeLange) – 4:36
12. "Cómo Fue" (Ernesto Duarte Brito) – 4:12
13. "On the Street Where You Live" (Alan Jay Lerner, Frederick Loewe) – 5:35
14. "Maple Leaf Rag" (Scott Joplin) – 2:37
15. "Sarcasmi" – 3:27
16. "Don't Talk (Put Your Head on My Shoulder)" (Tony Asher, Brian Wilson) – 6:18

== Personnel ==
- Stefano Bollani – piano
