= Elda Tattoli =

Italian actress and film director

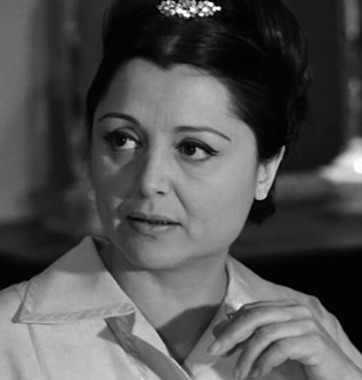
- Born: 1929; Bologna, Emilia-Romagna, Italy
- Died: 2005 (aged 75–76); Rome, Lazio, Italy
- Occupation(s): Actress, Director

Elda Tattoli (1929–2005) was an Italian actress and film director.

== Selected filmography ==
- Hercules Unchained (1959)
- The Warrior Empress (1960)
- China is Near (1967)
- Love and Anger (1969)

== Bibliography ==
- Sloan, Jane. Reel Women: An International Directory of Contemporary Feature Films about Women. Scarecrow Press, 2007.
