= China Is Near =

- Directed by: Marco Bellocchio
- Written by: Marco Bellocchio; Elda Tattoli
- Produced by: Franco Cristaldi; Oscar Brazzi
- Starring: Glauco Mauri; Elda Tattoli; Paolo Graziosi
- Cinematography: Tonino Delli Colli
- Edited by: Roberto Perpignani
- Music by: Ennio Morricone
- Release date: 22 September 1967
- Running time: 116 minutes
- Country: Italy
- Language: Italian

China Is Near (Italian: La Cina è vicina) is a 1967 Italian drama film written and directed by Marco Bellocchio. It is a satirical movie about the struggle for political and social power. In 2008, the film was included on the Italian Ministry of Cultural Heritage’s 100 Italian films to be saved, a list of 100 films that "have changed the collective memory of the country between 1942 and 1978." Although selected as the Italian entry for the Best Foreign Language Film at the 40th Academy Awards, it was not nominated.

== Plot ==
Gordini Malvezzi is a family of the Romagna gentry. The nuclear family is composed of siblings Elena, Vittorio, and Camillo. Countess Elena is an attractive middle-aged woman who plays the part of a matriarch and indulges herself in sexual relationships with common men of the town but avoids further rapport because she is afraid they are just after her money. Count Vittorio is a secularist professor who has pursued fruitless efforts to launch a political career. On the other hand, Camillo is a seventeen-year-old seminary student who is in constant struggle with his aristocratic background and Catholic upbringing and finds a symbolic revolt in adopting a hardline Maoist political line.

Vittorio is in love with his accountant-secretary Giovanna but, although sympathetic with him, repelled by Vittorio's meek and impotent attitude, she rejects his advances and runs a relationship with Carlo, the young and ambitious accountant who also happens to be the treasurer of the local Unified Socialist Party branch. Carlo makes a plan to marry into the rich landed gentry through Elena and the party offers Vittorio a candidacy for the local administration elections. When Vittorio eventually drops his restrained support to Camillo's 'organisation' for the sake of his socialist candidacy, Camillo starts to subversively target his brother's campaign.

== Cast ==
- Glauco Mauri as Vittorio
- Elda Tattoli as Elena
- Paolo Graziosi as Carlo
- Daniela Surina as Giovanna
- Pierluigi Aprà as Camillo
- Alessandro Haber as Rospo
- Claudio Trionfi as Giacomo
- Laura De Marchi as Clotilde
- Claudio Cassinelli as Furio
- Rossano Jalenti
- Mimma Biscardi

== Reception ==
=== Critical response ===
China is Near has an approval rating of 60% on review aggregator website Rotten Tomatoes, based on 5 reviews, and an average rating of 7/10.

The film was warmly reviewed by Pauline Kael in The New Yorker on its release: " China Is Near has the boudoir complications of a classic comic opera...Bellochio uses the underside of family life for borderline horror and humor. His people are so awful they're funny...[Bellochio]..only twenty-eight - perhaps only a very young director can focus on such graceless, mean-spirited people with so much enjoyment..he probably exhibits the most fluid directorial technique since Max Ophuls.."

=== Awards and nominations ===
The film was selected as the Italian entry for the Best Foreign Language Film at the 40th Academy Awards, but was not accepted as a nominee.

== See also ==
- List of submissions to the 40th Academy Awards for Best Foreign Language Film
- List of Italian submissions for the Academy Award for Best Foreign Language Film
