= Blood of the Losers =

- Directed by: Michele Soavi
- Written by: Dardano Sacchetti; Massimo Sebastiani
- Starring: Michele Placido; Barbora Bobuľová; Alina Nedelea; Valerio Binasco; Stefano Dionisi; Ana Caterina Morariu; Alessandro Preziosi
- Cinematography: Giovanni Mammolotti
- Music by: Carlo Siliotto
- Release date: 2008
- Running time: 108 minutes
- Country: Italy
- Language: Italian

Blood of the Losers (Italian: Il sangue dei vinti, also known as The Blood of the Victims) is a 2008 Italian war drama film directed by Michele Soavi. It is based on a book by Giampaolo Pansa.

== Cast ==
- Michele Placido as Franco Dogliani
- Barbora Bobuľová as Anna Spada / Costantina
- Alessandro Preziosi as Ettore Dogliani
- Philippe Leroy as Umberto Dogliani
- Giovanna Ralli as Giulia Dogliani
- Stefano Dionisi as Kurt
- Alina Nedelea as Lucia Dogliani
- Daniela Giordano as Maria Rossini
- Ana Caterina Morariu as Elisa
- Luigi Maria Burruano as Mario Vagagini
- Valerio Binasco as Nello Foresti
- Tony Sperandeo as Salustri
- Raffaele Vannoli as Petrucci

== Reception ==
In his review for Variety, Jay Weissberg heavily criticized the film, referring to it as "a dangerous example of historical manipulation disguised as relativism".
