= Three Floors =

Film directed by Nanni Moretti

- Italian: Tre piani
- Directed by: Nanni Moretti
- Screenplay by: Nanni Moretti; Valia Santella; Federica Pontremoli
- Story by: Nanni Moretti; Valia Santella; Federica Pontremoli
- Based on: Shalosh Qomot by Eshkol Nevo
- Produced by: Nanni Moretti; Domenico Procacci
- Starring: Margherita Buy; Riccardo Scamarcio; Alba Rohrwacher; Adriano Giannini; Elena Lietti; Alessandro Sperduti; Denise Tantucci; Nanni Moretti
- Cinematography: Michele D'Attanasio
- Edited by: Clelio Benevento
- Music by: Franco Piersanti
- Production companies: Sacher Film; Fandango; Rai Cinema; Le Pacte
- Distributed by: 01 Distribution
- Release dates: 11 July 2021 (Cannes); 23 September 2021 (Italy)
- Running time: 119 minutes
- Countries: Italy; France
- Language: Italian

Three Floors (Italian: Tre piani) is a 2021 Italian drama film co-produced, co-written and directed by Nanni Moretti. It is based on the 2017 novel Shalosh Qomot by Eshkol Nevo, moving the setting from Tel Aviv to Rome, and also marking Moretti's first adaptation of the work of another artist. It stars an ensemble cast that includes Margherita Buy, Riccardo Scamarcio, Alba Rohrwacher, Adriano Giannini, Elena Lietti, Alessandro Sperduti, Denise Tantucci and Moretti, as neighbors in a three floor building.

The film had its world premiere in the main competition of the 74th Cannes Film Festival on 11 July 2021, where it was nominated for the Palme d'Or. It was theatrically released in Italy on 23 September 2021 by 01 Distribution.

== Plot ==
The story of three families living on different floors of the same middle-class apartment building.

== Cast ==
- Margherita Buy as Dora, Vittorio's wife
- Nanni Moretti as Vittorio, Dora's husband
- Alessandro Sperduti as Andrea, Dora and Vittorio's son
- Riccardo Scamarcio as Lucio, Sara's husband
- Elena Lietti as Sara, Lucio's wife
- Alba Rohrwacher as Monica, Giorgio's wife
- Adriano Giannini as Giorgio, Monica's husband
- Denise Tantucci as Charlotte
- Anna Bonaiuto as Giovanna, Renato's wife
- Paolo Graziosi as Renato, Giovanna's husband
- Stefano Dionisi as Roberto
- Tommaso Ragno as Luigi

== Production ==
The shooting began on 4 March 2019 in Rome and lasted until May. It was delayed several times through 2020, in result of the COVID-19 pandemic, staying in post-production for almost two years.

== Release ==
Three Floors had its world premiere at the 2021 Cannes Film Festival where it received a standing ovation of eleven minutes. The film was screened as a special presentation at the 2021 Toronto International Film Festival.

== Reception ==
Three Floors has an approval rating of 48% on review aggregator website Rotten Tomatoes, based on 23 reviews, and an average rating of 4.9/10. The website's critical consensus states: "Lacking the essential spark of director Nanni Moretti's best work, Three Floors does a dreary disservice to its laudable themes". Metacritic assigned the film a weighted average score of 42 out of 100, based on 9 critics, indicating "mixed or average reviews".
