= Elio Germano =

Italian actor (born 1980)

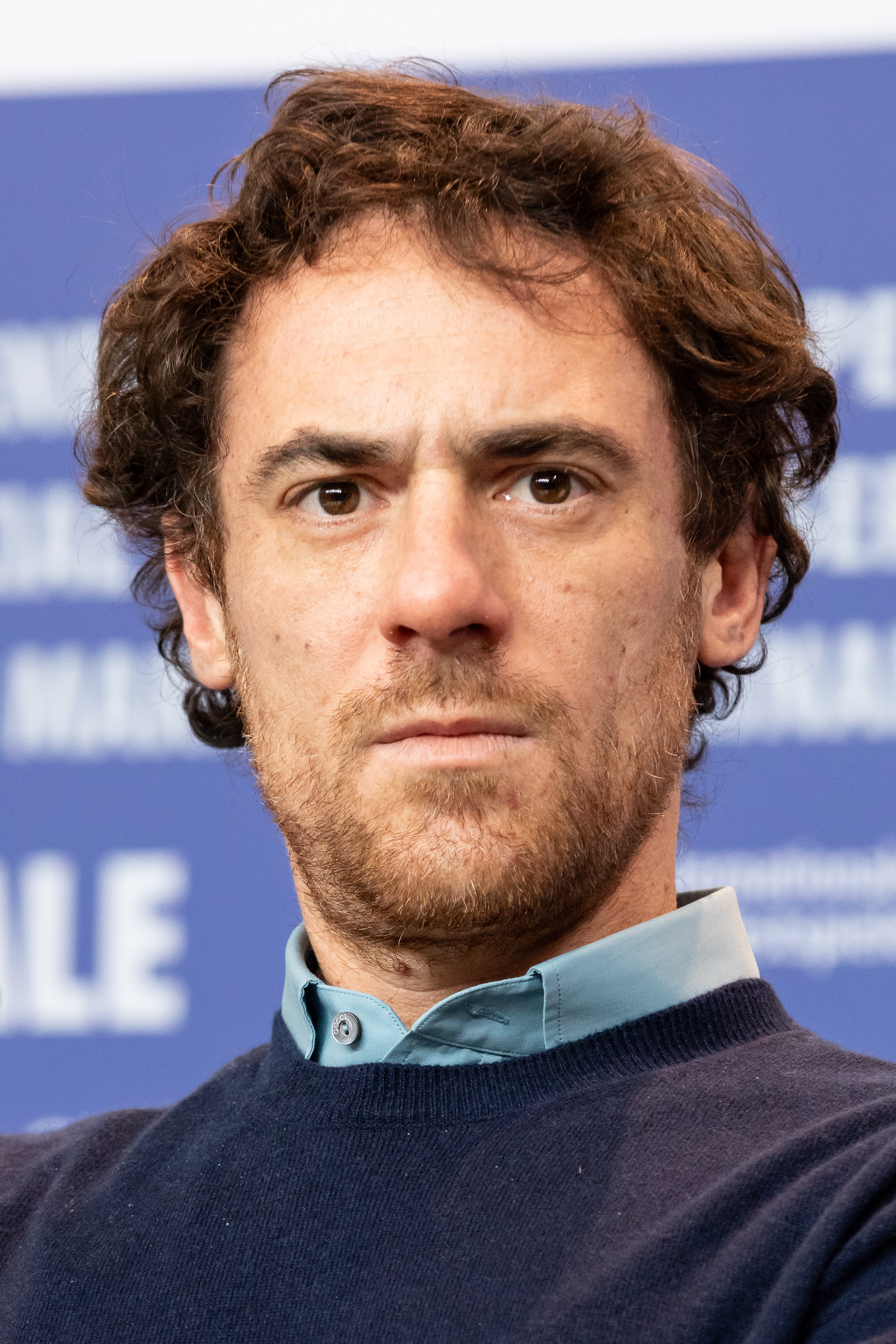
- Germano at the Berlinale 2020
- Born: 25 September 1980 (age 45); Rome, Italy
- Occupation: Actor
- Years active: 1992–present

Elio Germano (born 25 September 1980) is an Italian actor and director. He is the recipient of numerous accolades, including six David of Donatello., a Cannes Film Festival Award for Best Actor and a Silver Bear for Best Actor.

== Life and career ==
Born in Rome to a Molisan family from Duronia, Province of Campobasso, Germano debuted aged twelve in Castellano e Pipolo's movie Ci hai rotto papà (1992). During his studies at scientific lyceum, he received acting training at Teatro Azione in Rome. In 1999, he abandoned an opportunity to work in theatre with Giancarlo Cobelli in order to play in Carlo Vanzina's film Il cielo in una stanza, which launched Germano as one of the most popular Italian actors. His big break came in 2007, when he was cast as the lead in the successful movies Fallen Heroes and My Brother is an Only Child by Daniele Luchetti. The following year he first received international recognition by winning the Shooting Stars Award at the 58th Berlin International Film Festival.

Germano worked with numerous directors such as Ettore Scola (Unfair Competition), Emanuele Crialese (Respiro), Gianluca Maria Tavarelli (Break Free), Giovanni Veronesi (What Will Happen to Us), Michele Placido (Romanzo Criminale), Gabriele Salvatores (Quo Vadis, Baby?, As God Commands), Paolo Virzì (Napoleon and Me, Your Whole Life Ahead of You), Francesco Patierno (The Early Bird Catches the Worm), Daniele Vicari (The Past Is a Foreign Land) and Ferzan Özpetek (Magnificent Presence).

For his role in the movie My Brother is an Only Child (2007), he won his first David di Donatello as best actor in a leading role. In 2010, he won the Best Actor Award, ex-aequo with Javier Bardem, at the Cannes Film Festival, for his interpretation in La Nostra Vita. Later that year, he played the son of Italian journalist Tiziano Terzani in The End Is My Beginning. For his portrait of 19th century poet Giacomo Leopardi in Mario Martone's film Leopardi, Germano was praised at the 71st Venice International Film Festival.

== Personal life ==
At an early age Germano liked creating comics and thought about becoming a cartoonist. When he was not accepted into the school of graphic arts, he then opted for acting. In his spare time, Germano makes raps for a music group called Bestierare, which sings about "unemployment, homelessness, precariousness, prisons and Fascist violence".

== Filmography ==
=== Film ===
Title	Year	Role(s)	Director	Notes
Il cielo in una stanza	1999	Paolo	Carlo Vanzina	
Unfair Competition	2001	Paolo Melchiorri	Ettore Scola	
Ultimo stadio	2002	Billo	Ivano De Matteo	
Respiro	2002	Pierluigi	Emanuele Crialese	
Now or Never	2003	Doveri	Lucio Pellegrini	
Break Free	2003	Vince	Gianluca Tavarelli	
What Will Happen to Us	2004	Manuel	Giovanni Veronesi	
Chiamami Salomè	2005	Giovanni	Claudio Sestieri	
Quo Vadis, Baby?	2005	Lucio Spasimo	Gabriele Salvatores	
Mary	2005	Matteo	Abel Ferrara	
Sangue – La morte non esiste	2005	Iuri	Libero De Rienzo	
Romanzo Criminale	2005	Romolo "Il sorcio" Mirabelli	Michele Placido	
Melissa P.	2005	Arnaldo	Luca Guadagnino	
Napoleon and Me	2006	Martino Papucci	Paolo Virzì	
My Brother Is an Only Child	2007	Antonio Benassi	Daniele Luchetti	
Fallen Heroes	2007	Luca Neri	Paolo Franchi	
The Early Bird Catches the Worm	2008	Marco Baldini	Francesco Patierno	
Your Whole Life Ahead of You	2008	Lucio	Paolo Virzì	
The Past Is a Foreign Land	2008	Giorgio	Daniele Vicari	
As God Commands	2008	Quattro Formaggi	Gabriele Salvatores	
La bella gente	2009	Giulio	Ivano De Matteo	
Nine	2009	Pierpaolo	Rob Marshall	
La nostra vita	2010	Claudio	Daniele Luchetti	
The End Is My Beginning	2010	Folco Terzani	Jo Baier	
Diaz – Don't Clean Up This Blood	2012	Luca Gualtieri	Daniele Vicari	
Magnificent Presence	2012	Pietro Pontechiavello	Ferzan Özpetek	
The Landlords	2012	Elia	Edoardo Gabbriellini	
The Fifth Wheel	2013	Ernesto	Giovanni Veronesi	
Leopardi	2014	Giacomo Leopardi	Mario Martone	
Suburra	2015	Sebastiano	Stefano Sollima	
The Lady in the Car with Glasses and a Gun	2015	Georges	Joann Sfar	
Alaska	2015	Fausto	Claudio Cupellini	
Lost and Beautiful	2015	Sarchiapone (voice)	Pietro Marcello	
Il sogno di Francesco	2016	Francis of Assisi	Renaud Fely	
Tenderness	2017	Fabio	Gianni Amelio	
It's All About Karma	2017	Mario Pitagora	Edoardo Falcone	
Io sono Tempesta	2018	Bruno	Daniele Luchetti	
Lucia's Grace	2018	Arturo	Gianni Zanasi	
The Man Without Gravity	2019	Oscar	Mario Bonfanti	
Bad Tales	2020	Bruno Placido	Damiano and Fabio D'Innocenzo	
Hidden Away	2020	Antonio Ligabue	Giorgio Diritti	
Rose Island	2020	Giorgio Rosa	Sydney Sibilia	
America Latina	2021	Massimo Sisti	Damiano and Fabio D'Innocenzo	
Lord of the Ants	2022	Ennio Scribani	Gianni Amelio	
Palazzina Laf	2023	Giancarlo Basile	Michele Riondino	
Confidenza	2024	Pietro Vella	Daniele Luchetti	
Sicilian Letters	2024	Matteo	Fabio Grassadonia and Antonio Piazza	
The Great Ambition	2024	Enrico Berlinguer	Andrea Segre	
Three Goodbyes	2025	Antonio	Isabel Coixet	

=== Television ===
Title	Year	Role(s)	Network	Notes
Cornetti al miele	1999	Ernesto	Rai 2	Television film
Padre Pio: Miracle Man	2000	Young Padre Pio	Canale 5	Television film
Un medico in famiglia	2000	Roberto Palombi	Rai 1	5 episodes
Via Zanardi 33	2001	Ivan	Italia 1	Main role
Il sequestro Soffiantini	2002	Paolo Soffiantini	Canale 5	Television film
Padri	2002	Giacomo	Rai 1	2 episodes
Ferrari	2003	Teenage Enzo Ferrari	Canale 5	Television film
Paolo Borsellino	2004	Manfredi Borsellino	Canale 5	Television film
Do You Like Hitchcock?	2005	Giulio	Rai 2	Television film
Faccia d'angelo	2012	Il "Toso"	Sky Cinema	Television film
In arte Nino	2017	Nino Manfredi	Rai 1	Television film
La Storia	2024	Giuseppe Cucchiarelli	Rai 1	2 episodes

== Theatre ==
Year	Title	Role	Regia
2000	Hippolytus	Hippolytus	Ivano De Matteo
1999–2000	Ground & Ground		Himself
2002	The Rules of Attraction	Sean	Luca Guadagnino
2004	I racconti dell'Iliade	Narrator	Alessandro Baricco
2008	Verona Caput Fasci		Himself
2010–2012	Thom Pain (based on nothing)	Thom Pain	Himself
2011–2016	Journey to the End of the Night	Ferdinand Bardamu	Himself

== Awards and nominations ==
Award	Year	Category	Nominated work	Result	Ref.
Bari International Film Festival	2011	Best Actor	La nostra vita	Won	
Bari International Film Festival	2015	Best Actor	Leopardi	Won	
Berlin International Film Festival	2008	Shooting Stars Award	Himself	Won	
Berlin International Film Festival	2020	Silver Bear for Best Actor	Hidden Away	Won	
Cannes Film Festival	2010	Prix d'interprétation masculine (tied with Javier Bardem)	La nostra vita	Won	
Ciak d'Oro	2007	Best Actor	My Brother Is an Only Child	Won	
Ciak d'Oro	2012	Best Actor	Magnificent Presence	Won	
Ciak d'Oro	2015	Best Actor	Leopardi	Won	
Ciak d'Oro	2020	Best Actor	Bad Tales	Nominated	
Ciak d'Oro	2022	Best Actor	America Latina	Nominated	
David di Donatello	2004	Best Supporting Actor	What Will Happen to Us	Nominated	
David di Donatello	2007	Best Actor	My Brother Is an Only Child	Won	
David di Donatello	2011	Best Actor	La nostra vita	Won	
David di Donatello	2012	Best Actor	Magnificent Presence	Nominated	
David di Donatello	2015	Best Actor	Leopardi	Won	
David di Donatello	2018	Best Supporting Actor	Tenderness	Nominated	
David di Donatello	2021	Best Actor	Hidden Away	Won	
David di Donatello	2022	Best Actor	America Latina	Nominated	
David di Donatello	2023	Best Supporting Actor	Lord of the Ants	Nominated	
David di Donatello	2024	Best Supporting Actor	Palazzina Laf	Won	
David di Donatello	2025	Best Actor	The Great Ambition	Won	
European Film Awards	2007	Best Actor	My Brother Is an Only Child	Nominated	
European Film Awards	2010	Best Actor	La nostra vita	Nominated	
European Film Awards	2020	Best Actor	Hidden Away	Nominated	
FICE Awards	2005	Best New Actor	Sangue – La morte non esiste	Won	
Globo d'Oro	2007	Best Breakthrough Actor	Napoleon and Me	Won	
Globo d'Oro	2008	Best Actor	Fallen Heroes	Nominated	
Globo d'Oro	2011	Best Actor	La nostra vita	Nominated	
Globo d'Oro	2012	Best Actor	Magnificent Presence	Won	
Globo d'Oro	2016	Best Actor	Alaska	Won	
Globo d'Oro	2024	Best Actor	Confidenza	Won	
Guglielmo Biraghi Award	2007	Best Actor	Napoleon and Me	Won	
Kineo Award	2008	Best Actor	My Brother Is an Only Child	Won	
Kineo Award	2008	Best Actor	The Early Bird Catches the Worm	Nominated	
Kineo Award	2008	Best Supporting Actor	Your Whole Life Ahead of You	Nominated	
Kineo Award	2012	Best Actor	Diaz – Don't Clean Up This Blood	Nominated	
Kineo Award	2015	Best Actor	Leopardi	Won	
Nastro d'Argento	2005	Best Supporting Actor	What Will Happen to Us	Nominated	
Nastro d'Argento	2008	Best Actor	My Brother Is an Only Child	Nominated	
Nastro d'Argento	2008	Best Actor	Fallen Heroes	Nominated	
Nastro d'Argento	2010	Best Actor (tied with Christian De Sica)	La nostra vita	Won	
Nastro d'Argento	2012	Best Actor	Magnificent Presence	Nominated	
Nastro d'Argento	2014	Best Actor	The Fifth Wheel	Nominated	
Nastro d'Argento	2016	Best Actor	Alaska	Nominated	
Nastro d'Argento	2021	Best Comedy Actor	Rose Island	Won	
Nastro d'Argento	2024	Best Supporting Actor	Palazzina Laf	Won	
Rome Film Festival	2024	Best Actor	The Great Ambition	Won	
Terni Film Festival	2016	Honorary Award	Himself	Won	
Venice International Film Festival	2014	Pasinetti Award	Leopardi	Won	
Venice International Film Festival	2014	Vittorio Veneto Award	Leopardi	Won	
