= Paolo Graziosi =

Italian actor (1940–2022)

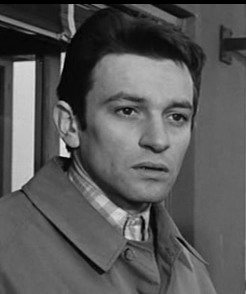
- Graziosi in China Is Near (1967)
- Born: 25 January 1940; Rimini, Italy
- Died: 1 February 2022 (aged 82); Vicenza, Italy
- Occupation: Actor
- Years active: 1962–2022

Paolo Graziosi (25 January 1940 – 1 February 2022) was an Italian stage and film actor.

== Biography ==
Born in Rimini, Graziosi was rejected for the admission exams at the Academy of Dramatic Arts Silvio D'Amico in 1961. He then enrolled at the Centro Sperimentale di Cinematografia. In theater, after a period of apprenticeship, he had his first break in 1965 with the role of Mercutio in a famous version of Romeo and Juliet directed by Franco Zeffirelli. In cinema, in which he had made his debut the 1962 drama film Gli arcangeli, his breakout role was an accountant named Carlo in China is Near by Marco Bellocchio (who had been his classmate in the Centro Sperimentale and that had previously directed him in the 1962 short film Ginepro fatto uomo). From then on, Graziosi continued appearing in films and television series, usually in secondary roles, but from seventies he focused his activities on stage, co-founding with Carlo Cecchi "GranTeatro", a company mainly active in alternative circuits.

Graziosi, who was battling cancer, died of COVID-19 in Vicenza on 1 February 2022, seven days after his 82nd birthday.

== Selected filmography ==
- A Gangstergirl (1966)
- China is Near (1968)
- Galileo (1968)
- Cuore di mamma (1969)
- Illustrious Corpses (1976)
- Merry Christmas... Happy New Year (1989)
- The Conviction (1991)
- A Simple Story (1991)
- Louis, the Child King (1993)
- The Long Silence (1993)
- Fallen Heroes (2007)
- Il divo (2008)
- Giovanna's Father (2008)
- Italian Race (2016)
- The Stolen Caravaggio (2018)
- Pinocchio (2019)
- The Bad Poet (2020)
- Three Floors (2021)
