= Joel Nascimento =

- Born: 13 November 1937; Rio de Janeiro
- Occupation(s): Musician, composer, mandolin, multi-instrumentalist

Joel Nascimento (Rio de Janeiro, October 13, 1937) is a Brazilian musician, mandolin player, and multi-instrumentalist. He toured with John McLaughin, Paco de Lucia, Raphael Rabello and Arthur Moreira Lima. He was labeled by historian Paul Sparks "perhaps the leading player of the present day" for his skill as a performance mandolinist.
