= Emerenz Meier =

German writer (1874–1928)

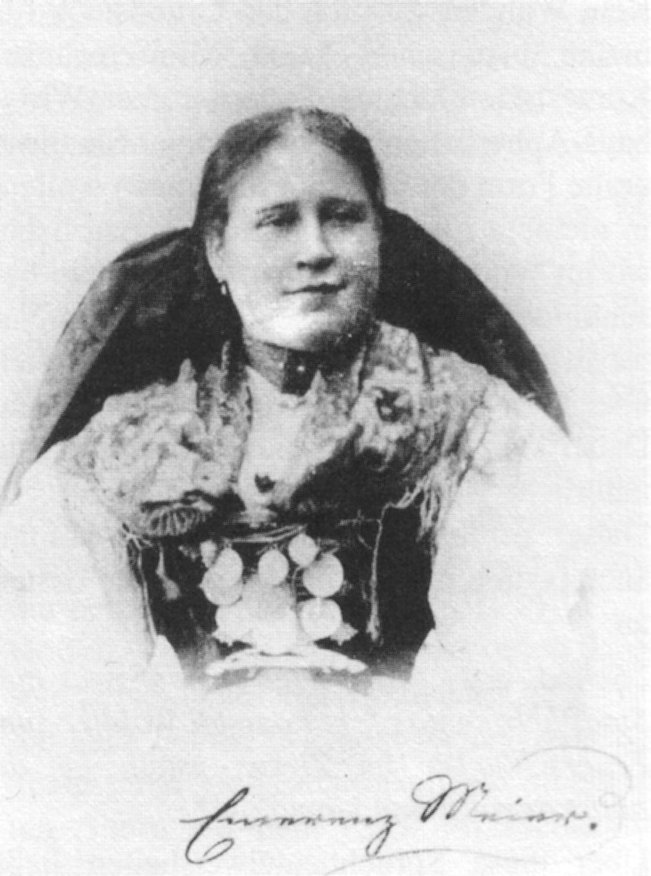
- before 1925
- Born: October 3, 1874; Schiefweg, Germany
- Died: February 28, 1928 (aged 53); Chicago, Illinois, US
- Occupation: Novelist
- Writing career
- Genre: Homeland novel
- Notable work: Aus dem bayrischen Wald

Emerenz Meier (October 3, 1874 – February 28, 1928) was a German writer. She is most known for her work in Bavarian folk poetry.

== Biography ==
Emerenz Meier was the daughter of Emerenz Meier, née Raab, and the farmer, livestock dealer and innkeeper Josef Meier in Schiefweg at Waldkirchen, Lower Bavaria. She started to write about her Heimat (homeland) as a child. In 1893, her first newspaper short story was published in Passau. In the autumn of 1896, her first and only book, From the Bavarian Forest, was released in the East Prussian Königsberg.

Because of the poor economic situation parts of the family emigrated to North America. In March 1906 Emerenz Meier followed her father and her sisters to Chicago. The expected personal economic upturn, however, did not occur. The First World War intensified her criticism of the political, economic and social conditions in Europe and America.

Emerenz Meier died on February 28, 1928, in Chicago at the age of 53 years of complications from nephritis.

== Work ==
Her stories and poems were published in magazines such as Simplicissimus and Fliegende Blätter.

== Film ==
Her life is dramatised in the 1991 Anica Dobra film Wildfire.
