= Valerio Binasco =

Italian actor, stage director, and playwright

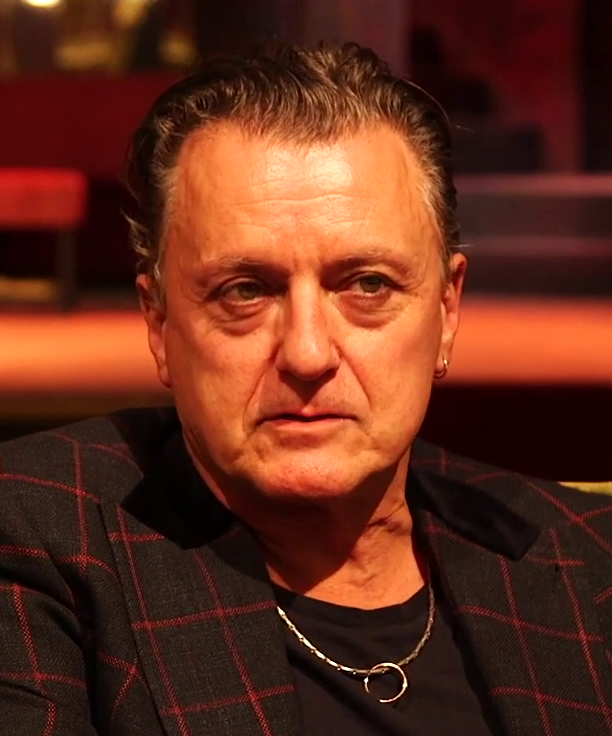
- Binasco in 2021
- Born: 20 June 1964 (age 60); Paderna, Italy
- Occupation(s): Actor, director

Valerio Binasco (born 20 June 1964) is an Italian actor, stage director, and playwright.

== Life and career ==
Born in Paderna, Binasco graduated at the drama school of the Stabile di Genova, where he made his professional debut in 1987. He won two Ubu Awards, in 1999 for playing Hamlet in an adaptation directed by Carlo Cecchi and in 2004 for playing Polynices in a stage adaptation of Oedipus at Colonus directed by Mario Martone. Also active in films, in 2016 Binasco was nominated for David di Donatello for Best Supporting Actor thanks to his performance in Alaska.

== Selected filmography ==
- This Is Not Paradise (2000)
- Domenica (2001)
- Two Friends (2002)
- Working Slowly (Radio Alice) (2004)
- The Beast in the Heart (2005)
- Texas (2005)
- Don't Make Any Plans for Tonight (2006)
- A Perfect Day (2008)
- Blood of the Losers (2008)
- We Believed (2010)
- Leopardi (2014)
- Alaska (2015)
- A Woman's Name (2018)
- Darkness (2019)
- Lord of the Ants (2022)
