= I Visionari (album) =

Studio album by Stefano Bollani
- Released: 2006
- Genre: Jazz
- Length: 83:21
- Label: Label Bleu
- Producer: Pierre Walfisz

Stefano Bollani chronology
Gleda (2005)	I Visionari (2006)	Piano Solo (2006)

I Visionari is an album by Stefano Bollani.

== Music and recording ==
The core band is a quintet led by pianist Stefano Bollani. The material is mostly instrumentals.

== Release and reception ==
I Visionari was released as a double-CD by Label Bleu in 2006. Critic John Fordham wrote: "A kind of Italian Django Bates with a more orthodox lyrical sense, Bollani keeps the surprises coming, wrapped in some fine writing. A good place for newcomers to start."

== Track listing ==
All songs are by Stefano Bollani, except as noted.

=== Disc A ===
1. "La Sicilia" – 6:15
2. "Il Fiore Canta e poi Svanisce" – 6:22
3. "Visione Numero Uno" – 10:35
4. "Carnevale di Dunkerque" – 5:50
5. "Storta Va" – 6:39
6. "Che Cosa Sono le Nuvole" (Domenico Modugno / Pier Paolo Pasolini) – 4:33

=== Disc B ===
1. "Intro" (Mark Feldman, Nico Gori, Mirko Guerrini) – 1:37
2. "Per Scordarti di Me" – 1:55
3. "Visione Numero Due" – 5:20
4. "Antichi Insediamenti Urbani" – 7:27
5. "Alone Together" (Howard Dietz / Arthur Schwartz) – 4:04
6. "Scartabello" – 5:56
7. "Mamma Mia Dammi Cento Lire" (traditional) – 3:34
8. "Impro" (Federico Spinetti) – 1:22
9. "Quando la Morte Verrà a Prendermi" – 2:15
10. "Sardità" – 3:36
11. "Visione Numero Tre" – 5:54

== Personnel ==
- Stefano Bollani – piano, vocals (track A6)
- Mirko Guerrini – tenor sax, soprano sax, flute
- Nico Gori – clarinet, bass clarinet
- Federico Spinetti – bass
- Cristiano Calcagnile – drums
- Mark Feldman – violin (tracks A2, B1, B6)
- Paolo Fresu – trumpet (track B10)
- Petra Magoni – vocals (track B2, B7)
