= Jesper Bodilsen =

Danish jazz double bassist

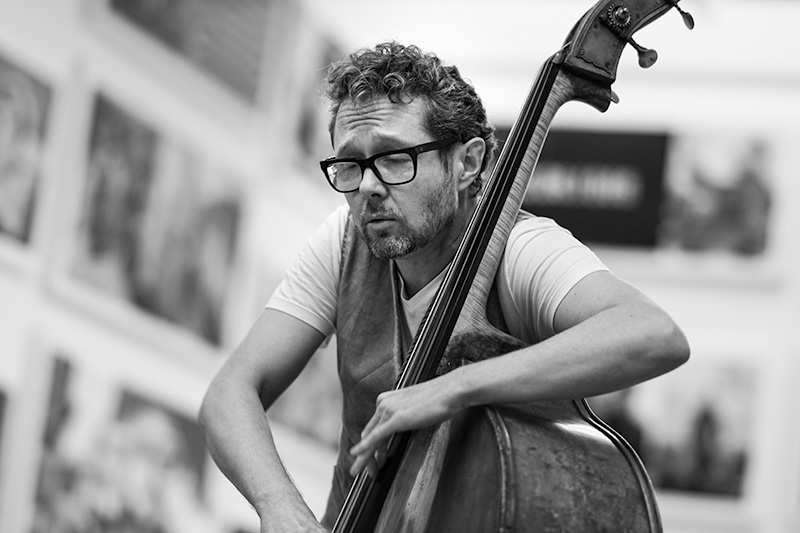
- Jesper Bodilsen Trio featuring Enrico Rava; Aarhus, Denmark 2017

Background information
- Born: 5 January 1970 (age 56); Haslev, Sjælland, Denmark
- Genres: Jazz
- Occupations: Musician, composer
- Labels: Stunt; ECM; Carosello
- Website: Official website

Jesper Bodilsen (born 5 January 1970) is a Danish jazz double bassist.

== Biography ==
Bodilsen was born in Haslev, Denmark. He was a student of Niels-Henning Ørsted Pedersen. Since the end of the 1990s he worked regularly with Ed Thigpen, with whom he recorded various albums. Furthermore, he worked with, among others, Joe Lovano, Brad Mehldau, Bill Frisell, Gregory Porter, Jeff “Tain” Watts, Lee Konitz, Marc Turner, Stefano Bollani, Lionel Loueke, Gino Vanelli, Phil Woods, Tom Harrell, Joey Calderazzo, Dino Saluzzi, Jimmy Heath, Benny Golson, James Moody, Horace Parlan, Duke Jordan, John Abercrombie, Enrico Rava, Paul Vertigo, Seamus Blake, David Sanchez, Fabrizio Bosso, Paulo Fresu, Stefano Bollani and Katrine Madsen. With George Colligan, he recorded a duo album. He leads his own trio with pianist Stefano Bollani and drummer Morten Lund.

== Awards and honors ==
In 2004 he was awarded a Django d'Or as "Performer of the year"

== Discography ==
=== Solo albums ===
- 2009: Short Stories for Dreamers (Stunt), with Ulf Wakenius, Peter Asplund & Severi Pyysalo
- 2013: Scenografie (Carosello Records), including Stefano Bollani (piano), Ulf Wakenius (guitar), Peter Asplund (trumpet, flugelhorn), Nico Gori (clarinet), Paolo Russo (bandoneon), Joe Barbieri (voice)
- 2016: Acouspace Plus - Tid (Gateway Records) including Joakim Milder (tenor sax), Claus Waidtløw (tenorsax) & Spejderrobot (electronica).
- 2016: Santa Claus is Coming to Town (Up Art Records) including Joe Barbieri (voice), Mads Mathias (voice), Marie Ingeborg Bodilsen (voice), Peter Rosendal (piano), Regin Fuhlendorf (guitar), Francesco Cali (accordion) & Claus Waidtløw (tenorsax).

Duo with George Colligan

- 2000: Twins (SteepleChase)
- 2001: A Wish (SteepleChase)

Trio with Stefano Bollani & Morten Lund

- 2004: Mi Ritorni in Mente (Stunt Records)
- 2006: Gleda (Stunt Records)
- 2009: Stone In The Water (ECM)

Baltic Trio with Max De Aloe & Niklas Winter

- 2017: Valo (Abeat)

Pieris with Marco Mezquida (piano) & Martin Andersen (drums)

- 2018: Pieris (Stunt Records)

=== Collaborations ===
- 1998: Its Entertainment (Stunt Records) with Ed Thigpen Rhythm Features
- 2002: The Element of Swing (Stunt Records), with [Joe Lovano] & Ed Thigpen Rhythm Features
- 2014: Joy In Spite of Everything (ECM), with Stefano Bollani, Marc Turner (tenor sax) & Bill Frisell (guitar).
- 2017 Mediterraneo (ACT) With Stefano Bollani (piano), Jesper Bodilsen (bass), Morten Lund (drums), Vincent Peirani (accordion, accordina), Berlin Philharmonic; in concert

== Gallery ==
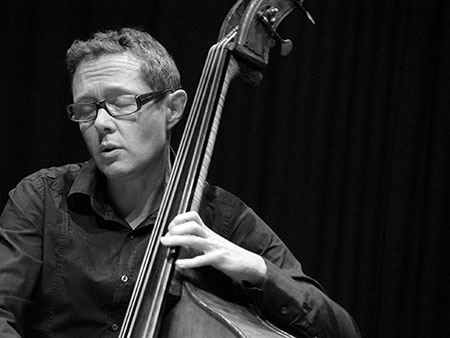

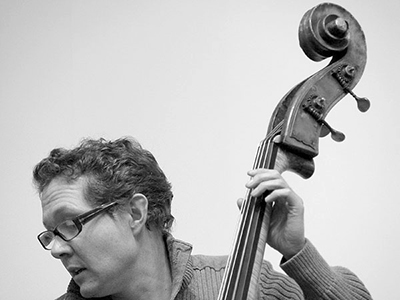

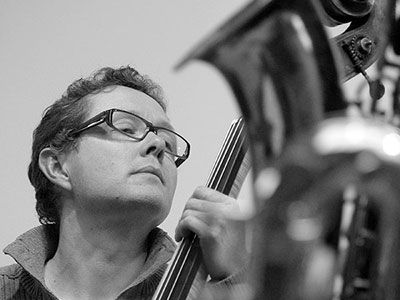

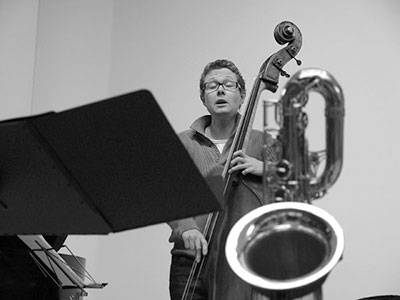
