= Mymovies.it =

Website dedicated to Italian cinema

MYmovies.it

- Screenshot
- Website type: Online movie, TV and multimedia database
- Available in: Italian
- Owner: Gruppo Editoriale L'Espresso
- Website: mymovies.it
- Commercial: Yes
- Registration: Optional
- Launched: 2000
- Current status: Active

MYmovies.it is a website dedicated to Italian cinema. Established in 2000, the website contains a database on Italian films and television series and actors with films from 1895 to present. The website also features reviews of upcoming films, interviews with actors and directors and other notable figures in the Italian film industry and international news related to film. In 2010, it also launched a streaming platform, Mymovieslive!. The website is particularly popular among Italian men aged 25 to 45 according to demographic surveys and is the 56th most popular website with Internet users from Italy.

As of 2013, the website included over one million pages, over 200,000 reviews, and it collected over 3 million monthly unique visitors.
