= Stefano Bollani =

Italian jazz pianist and singer

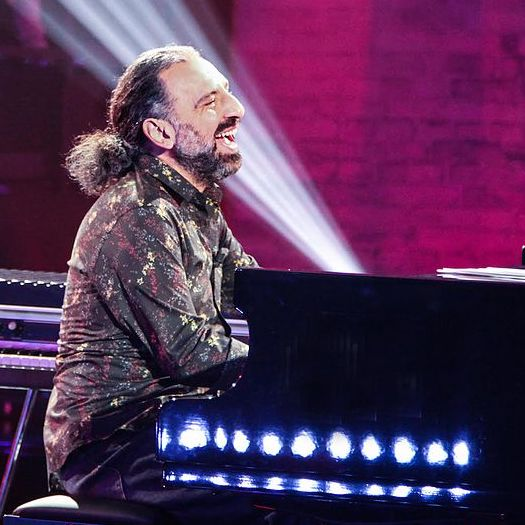

Background information
- Born: 5 December 1972 (age 53); Milan, Italy
- Genre: Jazz
- Occupation: Musician
- Instrument: Piano
- Years active: 1987–present
- Labels: Philology, Stunt, ECM, Decca, Universal, Label Bleu
- Website: stefanobollani.com

Stefano Bollani (born 5 December 1972) is an Italian composer, pianist and singer, also active as a writer and a television presenter.

He has worked with such musicians as Gato Barbieri, Chick Corea, Bill Frisell, Sol Gabetta, Richard Galliano, Trilok Gurtu, Chuco Valdes, Egberto Gismonti, Lee Konitz, Bobby McFerrin, Pat Metheny, Caetano Veloso, Phil Woods, Hector Zazou and has recorded more than 15 albums with trumpeter Enrico Rava. Bollani has performed with several symphonic orchestras (Filarmonica della Scala, Orchestra dell'Accademia Nazionale di Santa Cecilia, Leipzig Gewandhaus Orchestra, Royal Concertgebouw Orchestra, Orchestre de Paris, Toronto Symphony Orchestra, among others) and with directors such as Riccardo Chailly, Daniel Harding, Kristjan Järvi, Zubin Mehta, Gianandrea Noseda and Antonio Pappano. He has also played with Italian pop-rock artists and has participated in and hosted TV and radio shows. Currently, he has published 49 albums alone (31 studio).

== Biography ==
=== Early life ===
Born in Milan to Roberto Bollani, from Lombardy, and a Venetian mother from Rovigo, Maddalena, he has a sister named Manuela born in Alba, Piedmont. He grew up in Florence and began his studies at the Florence Conservatory at the age of 6 and where he graduated in 1993 under the supervision of Maestro Antonio Caggiula. At 15 he had already started to perform professionally. After a short experience touring as a pop artist and after playing in the pop-rock band La Forma, since the mid-nineties he established himself in the jazz scene.

=== 1990s ===
A crucial event for Bollani's career was meeting Enrico Rava, who he started playing with in 1996. Together they have performed in hundreds of concerts and have recorded more than 15 albums, the first of which are Certi angoli segreti (1998), Rava Plays Rava and Shades of Chet (1999). Around these years Bollani also started playing with some of the most important Italian jazz artists: Paolo Fresu, Roberto Gatto and Enzo Pietropaoli. In 1998 he recorded his first album Gnòsi delle fànfole, based on poems by Fosco Maraini, with singer-songwriter Massimo Altomare. In the same year, he played for the first time with American saxophonist Lee Konitz in TenderLee for Chet, and won the prize for best new talent awarded by Italian magazine Musica Jazz. In 1999 two more albums came out: Mambo Italiano – recorded with one of his most trusted collaborators, double bass player Ares Tavolazzi – and L'orchestra del Titanic, recorded with the orchestra that gave the name to the album: Antonello Salis, Riccardo Onofri, Raffaello Pareti and Walter Paoli, besides Bollani himself. He also participated in Passatori, by the French accordionist Richard Galliano, with the Solisti dell'Orchestra della Toscana.

=== 2000s ===
Bollani's collaborations in the first years were not limited to jazz, but included works with Italian pop artists such as Elio, Irene Grandi, Marco Parente, Peppe Servillo, Bobo Rondelli, Banda Osiris, Bandabardò, Massimo Ranieri. In the meantime, the partnership with Enrico Rava kept flourishing and together they released Montréal Diary/B (2001),Tati (2005), The Third Man (2007) and New York Days (2009). Furthermore, Bollani featured in several albums and international tours where he played with such musicians as Gianni Basso, Gianluca Petrella, John Abercrombie, Jeff Ballard, Larry Grenadier, Paul Motian, Mark Turner, Phil Woods, Gato Barbieri and Pat Metheny. Two notable collaborations occurred in 2003: one with Russian singer Sainkho Namtchylak (Who Stole the Sky?), and one with Hector Zazou who invited Bollani to play alongside him in Strong Currents (other guests were Laurie Anderson, Jane Birkin and Ryuichi Sakamoto).

Between 2002 and 2006, Bollani recorded six albums for French Label Bleu. The series began with Les Fleurs bleues (2002), inspired by the novel by Raymond Queneu and recorded with Scott Colley and Clarence Penn, followed by Småt Småt (2003) highlighted by English magazine Mojo as one of the best albums of the year. In 2004 Concertone was released, the first album Bollani recorded with a symphonic orchestra – the Orchestra della Toscana directed by Paolo Silvestri – based on which choreographer Mauro Bigonzetti crafted a ballet for the Stuttgart Ballet. In the same year Bollani also won the New Star Award, conferred for the first time to a non-US musician by Japanese magazine Swing Journal. The last of the four albums was released in 2006, titled I visionari and recorded with the homonym band formed by Mirko Guerrini, Nico Gori, Ferruccio Spinetti and Cristiano Calcagnile, with special features by Mark Feldman, Paolo Fresu and Petra Magoni (at the time his wife).

During these same years, Japanese label Venus Records released four albums by the "Stefano Bollani Trio" formed with Ares Tavolazzi on contrabass and Walter Paoli on drums: Black and Tan Fantasy (2002), Volare (2002), Falando de amor (2003), Ma l'amore no (2004) and I'm in the Mood for Love (2007). At the same time Bollani began an intense collaboration with contrabass player Jesper Bodilsen and drummer Morten Lund, with whom he formed the "Danish Trio". In a three-year span, Stunt label released Mi ritorni in mente (2003), Close to You (2004, with Danish singer Katrine Madsen) and Gleda: Songs from Scandinavia (2005). Finally, in 2009, ECM published Stone in the Water.

In 2006, Piano Solo was released and the Italian magazine Musica Jazz awarded it the best album of the year and nominated Bollani for the best Italian musician of the year. The following year, Bollani tackled classical repertoire with the Filarmonica '900 of the Teatro Regio of Turin, directed by Jan Latham-Koenig, by recording the Concert champêtre, Les Animaux Modèles, and the Improvisations number 13 and 15 by Francis Poulenc. A few months later BollaniCarioca came out, recorded with important Brazilian artists. In 2007 he played a piano in a Rio de Janeiro favela: only Antônio Carlos Jobim had done this before. In the same year he won the Hans Koller European Jazz Prize as the best European musician of 2007 and was listed among the five most important musicians of the year by American website All About Jazz alongside Dave Brubeck, Ornette Coleman, Charles Mingus and Sonny Rollins.

Around this time, Bollani appeared again in the Italian pop music scene, but the most relevant collaboration was that started in 2009 with jazz pianist Chick Corea, with whom Bollani toured through various Italian cities showcasing a totally new duo performance. The live album Orvieto is based on these performances.

=== 2010–present ===
On 15 July 2010, Bollani received an Honorary Doctorate of Music from Berklee College of Music. On 14 September, the award was presented on the main stage of the Umbria Jazz Festival in Perugia, Italy by Berklee's former vice president of academic affairs, Larry Monroe. The same year Rhapsody in Blue – Concerto in F was released. The album includes three classical works by George Gershwin played by the Leipzig Gewandhaus Orchestra directed by Riccardo Chailly: Rhapsody in Blue (in the piano and jazz band version by Paul Whiteman), Piano Concerto in F, and Rialto Ripples. The album entered the pop charts ranking at number eight, making it the first ever classical music album in Italy to be included in the top ten. It also won the Platinum award after having sold seventy thousand copies.

In 2012, Bollani and Chailly played again with the Leipzig Gewandhaus Orchestra to record Sound of the 30s, which includes great classics from the Thirties: Piano Concerto in G major by Maurice Ravel, Tango by Igor Stravinsky, Tango Ballad (from The Threepenny Opera) and Surabaya Johnny (from the Happy End musical) by Kurt Weill, and A Thousand and One Nights by Victor de Sabata. The two played with the Orchestre de Paris, in Paris, and with the Filarmonica della Scala in Milan. The Milan concert was broadcast live in movie theaters of about 20 countries on April 21, 2012, and recorded on the Live at La Scala DVD (2013) that includes pieces by George Gershwin (Catfish Row, An American in Paris, Concerto in F, Rialto Ripples), by Scott Joplin (Maple Leaf Rag) and by Joseph Kosma (Autumn Leaves).

The numerous concerts with symphonic orchestras – directed by Daniel Harding, Kristian Järvi, Zubin Mehta, Gianandrea Noseda and Antonio Pappano among others – did not keep Bollani from recording various albums with other artists, such as Big Band!, with the Hamburg-based NDR Bigband directed by Norwegian saxophonist Geir Lysne (2011; Echo Jazz award 2013), Irene Grandi & Stefano Bollani (2012), O que será with Hamilton de Holanda (2013), Sheik Yer Zappa, a tribute to Frank Zappa's music (2014). Also in 2014, Bollani again recorded with the Danish Trio releasing Joy in Spite of Everything featuring Mark Turner and Bill Frisell, which was conferred the Best Album of the year award by Musica Jazz. On September 26, Bollani received another International award, namely the JTI Trier Jazz Award.

In 2015, Bollani recorded his first album as singer-songwriter Arivano gli alieni. The following year the new album Live from Mars was released and the project Napoli Trip begins: Bollani pays tribute to Neapolitan music accompanied by Daniele Sepe, Nico Gori, Manu Katché and Jan Bang, and alongside Arye Henriksen, Audun Klive and Hamilton de Holanda. Also in 2016, Bollani participated in Hamilton de Holanda's recording of Samba de chico and played with Chico Buarque in Vai trabalhar vagabundo. In 2017, he played at the Berliner Philharmonie with Jesper Bodilsen, Morten Lund, the French accordionist Vincent Peirani, and 14 members of the Berliner Philharmonic, paying homage to Italian composers such as Monteverdi, Leoncavallo, Puccini, Rossini, Rota, and Morricone. Directed and arranged by Geir Lysne, the concert became an album entitled Mediterraneo. In May 2018, Bollani released Que Bom, the first album of his own label, Alobar; made of new songs and entirely recorded in Rio de Janeiro, it features artists such as Caetano Veloso, João Bosco, Jaques Morelenbaum and Hamilton de Holanda. His latest albums include Piano Variations on Jesus Christ Superstar, a solo piano tribute to Jesus Christ Superstar released on the 50th anniversary of Andrew Lloyd Webber and Tim Rice's rock opera, and El Chakracanta, a live recording from Buenos Aires with the Orquesta Sin Fin, conducted by Exequiel Mantega.

In 2024 he was made Flaming Minister of the Etoile d'Or of the Vitellianense Pataphysical Institute

In 2024, the collaboration with Lorenzo Hengeller was important in Il pianerottolo (tracks Frasi fatte – Cantieri – Disaccordi – Il giorno dell'amore) and in 2025 he collaborated with Christian Mascetta in Ricami (track Il suono di casa mia).

== Other projects ==
Bollani wrote and hosted various Italian radio and TV shows: Il Dottor Djembè (Radio Rai 3, 2006–2012), Sostiene Bollani (Rai 3, 2001 and 2013), L'importante è avere un piano (Rai 1, 2016), and Via dei Matti nº0 (Rai 3, 2021–2022).

Bollani has also worked in theater, both as musician-actor and as composer. During the 2015/2016 season he co-wrote, co-directed and acted in La regina Dada with his partner Valentina Cenni.

Bollani has published several books, including the novel La sindrome di Brontolo (2006) and three works on the world of music: L'America di Renato Carosone (2004), Parliamo di musica (2013) and Il monello, il guru, l'alchimista e altre storie di musicisti (2015).

There is also a cartoon character based on Bollani, named Paperefano Bolletta, who appeared for the first time in the Italian version of the Disney magazine, Donald Duck pocket books (Topolino), on 22 September 2009.

Il tempo della stravaganza is his latest book released in March 2025.

== Awards and honors ==
=== Main awards ===
- 1998: Best New Talent (awarded by Italian magazine Musica Jazz)
- 2003: Premio Carosone
- 2004: New Star Award (awarded by Japanese magazine Swing Journal)
- 2006: Italian musician of the year (Musica Jazz)
- 2006: Piano solo album of the year (Musica Jazz)
- 2007: Hans Koller European Jazz Prize
- 2007: Musician of the year (awarded by American website All About Jazz)
- 2009: Paul Acket Award (awarded by North Sea Jazz Festival)
- 2010: Capri Global Artist Award
- 2010: Musician of the year (Musica Jazz)
- 2011: Premio Fiorentini nel mondo
- 2011: Los Angeles Excellence Award
- 2012: Premio Milano per la musica
- 2013: Echo Jazz award to Big Band! (album of the year for the category "Big Band")
- 2014: JTI Trier Jazz Award
- 2014: Joy in Spite of Everything album of the year (Musica Jazz)
- 2019: Premio Monini Una finestra sui due mondi
- 2021: Nastro d'Argento for Best Score – Carosello Carosone
- 2021: Flaiano Prize for Best Cultural TV Program – Via dei Matti nº0
- 2021: Tenco Award for Career Achievement
- 2022: Soundtrack Stars Award – Critics' Award (79th Venice International Film Festival)
- 2023: Best Music for the film Il Pataffio at the City of Spello Film Festival
- 2023: Classic Lucca Award
- 2023: David di Donatello for Best Soundtrack for the film Il Pataffio
- 2023: Nomination for Best soundtrack Nastri d'argento for the film Il Pataffio

=== Honors ===
- 2008: Gonfalone d'argento (awarded by Tuscany Region)
- 2010: Honorary Doctorate of Music from Berklee College of Music
- 2016: Order of Merit of the Italian Republic – Class: Commendatore
- Honorary member of the Italian Institute of 'Pataphysics

== Discography ==
=== As leader ===
Year recorded	Title	Label	Personnel/Notes
1998	Gnòsi delle fanfole	Sonica	With Massimo Altomare (vocals, guitar), Beatrice Bianchi (violin), Mirko Guerrini (sax, flute, clarinet), Riccardo Onori (guitar), Milko Ambrogini (bass), Walter Paoli (drums, percussion), Emy Berti and Riccardo Pangallo (vocals)
1999	L'orchestra del Titanic	Via Veneto Jazz	With Antonello Salis (accordion), Riccardo Onori (guitar) Raffaello Pareti (bass), Walter Paoli (drums)
1999	Mambo Italiano	Philology	With Ares Tavolazzi (bass)
2000	The Macerata Concert	Philology	Duo, with Franco D'andrea (piano)
2000	Abbassa la tua radio	Ermitage	With Massimo Altomare, Simona Bencini, Emy Berti, Stefano Bollani, Barbara Casini, Monica Demuru, Elio, Irene Grandi, Marco Parente, Peppe Servillo (vocals), Elena Gallafrio (violin), Roberto Gatto (drums), Javier Girotto, Mirko Guerrini (sax), Raffaello Pareti, Ares Tavolazzi (bass), Gianluca Petrella (trombone), Damiano Puliti (cello), Enrico Rava (trumpet)
2001	Il cielo da quaggiù	Via Veneto Jazz	Most tracks with Antonello Salis (accordion), Riccardo Onori (guitar) Lello Pareti (bass), Walter Paoli (drums); Petra Magoni (vocals) added on three tracks
2002	Black and Tan Fantasy	Venus	Trio, with Ares Tavolazzi (bass), Walter Paoli (drums)
2002	Les fleurs bleues	Label Bleu	Trio, with Scott Colley (bass), Clarence Penn (drums)
2002	Volare	Venus	Trio, with Ares Tavolazzi (bass), Walter Paoli (drums)
2003	Falando de amor	Venus	Trio, with Ares Tavolazzi (bass), Walter Paoli (drums)
2003	Småt Småt	Label Bleu	Solo piano, accordion, vocals
2003	Suite for Paolo	Philology	Duo, with Lee Konitz (sax)
2004	Concertone	Label Bleu	With Orchestra della Toscana
2004	Ma l'amore no	Venus	Trio, with Ares Tavolazzi (bass), Walter Paoli (drums)
2004	Mi ritorni in mente	Stunt	Trio, with Jesper Bodilsen (bass), Morten Lund (drums)
2005	Gleda	Stunt	Trio, with Jesper Bodilsen (bass), Morten Lund (drums)
2006	I Visionari	Label Bleu	Most tracks quintet, with Mirko Guerrini (saxes, flute), Nico Gori (clarinet), Federico Spinetti (bass), Cristiano Calcagnile (drums) some tracks with Paolo Fresu (trumpet), Mark Feldman (violin), or Petra Magoni (vocals) added
2006	Piano Solo	ECM	Solo piano
2007	BollaniCarioca	Universal	With Marco Pereira (guitar), Jorge Helder (bass), Jurim Moreira (drums), Armando Marçal "Marçalzinho" (percussion), Zé Nogueira (soprano sax), Nico Gori (clarinet, bass clarinet), Mirko Guerrini (tenor sax); Zé Renato and Mônica Salmaso (vocals) added on one track each
2007	Francis Poulenc: Les Animaux modèles; Concert champêtre; Improvisations 13, 15	Avie	With Filarmonica '900 del Teatro Regio di Torino
2007	I'm in the Mood for Love	Venus	Trio, with Ares Tavolazzi (bass), Walter Paoli (drums)
2008	Stone in the Water	ECM	Trio, with Jesper Bodilsen (bass), Morten Lund (drums)
2010	Gershwin: Rhapsody in Blue, Concerto in F	Decca	With Gewandhaus Orchestra
2010	Orvieto	ECM	Duo, with Chick Corea (piano); in concert
2011	Big Band!	Verve	With NDR Bigband; in concert
2012	Sounds of the 30s	Decca	
2012	Irene Grandi & Stefano Bollani	Carosello	Duo, with Irene Grandi (vocals)
2013	O que serà	ECM	Duo, with Hamilton de Holanda (bandolin); in concert
2014	Joy in Spite of Everything	ECM	With Mark Turner (tenor sax), Bill Frisell (guitar), Jesper Bodilsen (bass), Morten Lund (drums)
2014	Sheik Yer Zappa	Decca	With Jason Adasiewicz (vibraphone), Josh Roseman (trombone), Larry Grenadier (bass), Jim Black (drums)
2015	Arrivano gli alieni	Decca	Bollani is on vocals, piano and Fender Rhodes
2016	Live from Mars	Gruppo Editoriale L'Espresso	
2016	Napoli Trip	Decca	With Daniele Sepe (sax, flute), Nico Gori (clarinet), Manu Katche (drums)
2017	Mediterraneo	ACT	With Jesper Bodilsen (bass), Morten Lund (drums), Vincent Peirani (accordion, accordina), Berlin Philharmonic; in concert
2018	Que Bom	Alobar	With Jorge Helder, Jurim Moreira, Armando Marçal, Thiago da Serrinha, feat. Caetano Veloso, João Bosco, Jaques Morelenbaum, Hamilton de Holanda)
2019	The Music of Sasha Argov (Live in Tel Aviv)	Alobar	With Jesper Bodilsen (double bass), Nico Gori (clarinet), Morten Lund (drums), Antonello Salis (accordion, handclaps, voice)
2020	Piano Variations on Jesus Christ Superstar	Alobar	
2021	El Chakracanta (Live in Buenos Aires)	Alobar	With Orquesta Sin Fin, conducted by Exequiel Mantega
2022	Via dei Matti nº0	Sony Music	With Valentina Cenni
2023	Blooming	Sony Music	
2024	18 Preludi per pianoforte	Universal Music Italia	

=== Soundtracks ===
Year recorded	Title	Label	Notes
2021	Carosello Carosone	Universal	TV film directed by Lucio Pellegrini – Nastro d'Argento for Best Score
2022	Il pataffio	BMG	Film by Francesco Lagi
2022	Essere oro	Alobar, Vivo film	Film by Valentina Cenni
2025	Marcel Et Monsieur Pagnol		Film by Sylvain Chomet

== Gallery ==
Bollani performing in 2013

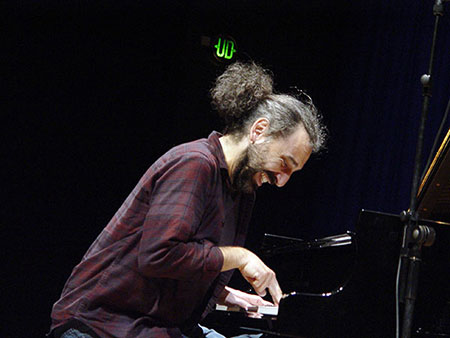

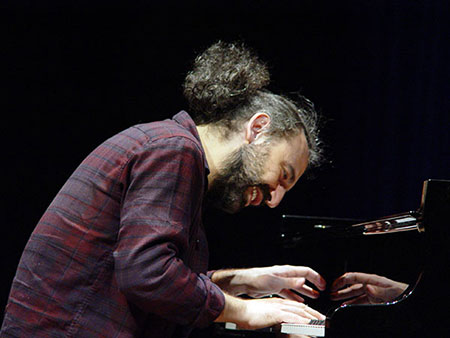

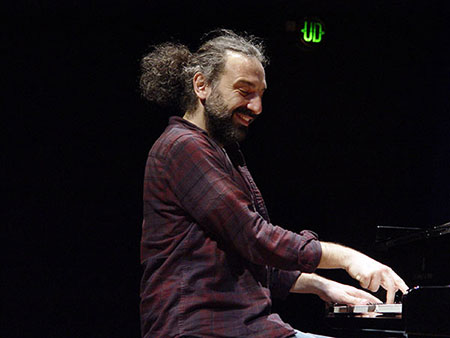

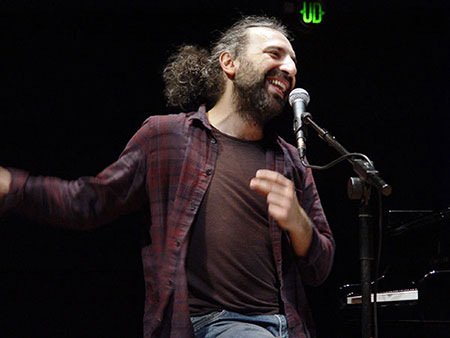

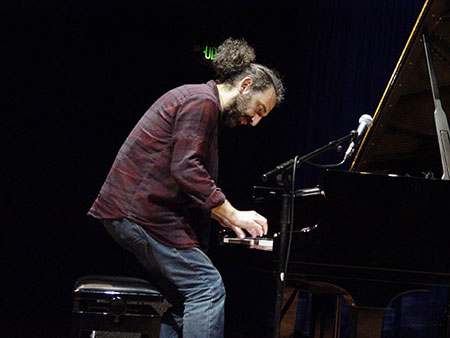

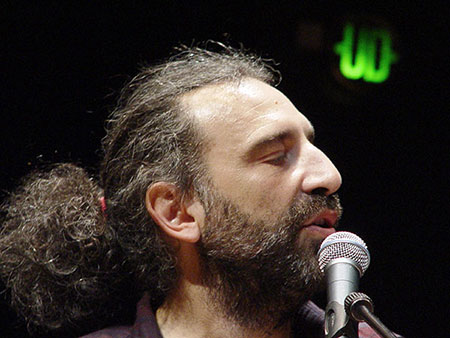

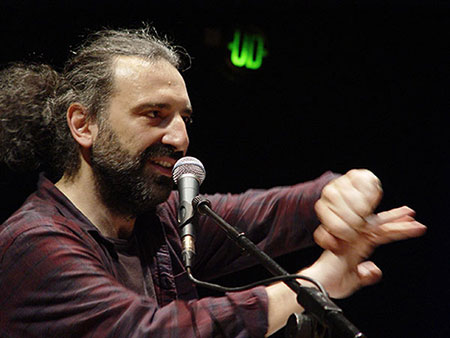
