= Morten Lund (musician) =

Danish jazz drummer (born 1972)

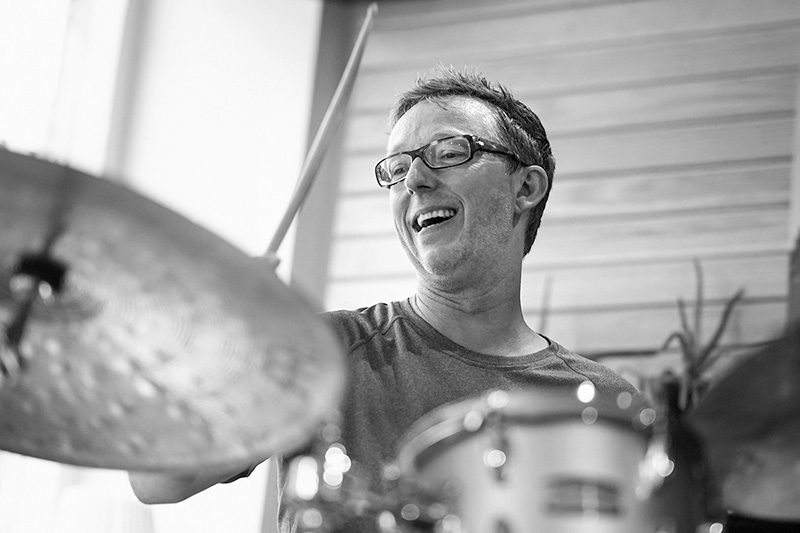
- Morten Lund at Aarhus Jazz Festival 2017

Background information
- Born: 13 September 1972 (age 53); Viborg, Jylland, Denmark
- Genres: Jazz
- Occupation: Musician
- Instrument: Drums
- Years active: 1987–present
- Labels: Stunt, ECM
- Website: Official website

Morten Lund (born 13 September 1972) is a Danish jazz drummer. He co-leads a trio with Italian pianist Stefano Bollani and Danish bassist Jesper Bodilsen, and he is a member of Paolo Fresu's Devil Quartet and Kind of Porgy and Bess ensembles. As a sideman, he has participated in more than 60 albums.

== Biography ==
Lund was born into a musical family in Viborg, Denmark, in 1972 to a father who played drums, trumpet, and guitar and was an active part of the city's jazz scene, and a mother who played the flute. At age 6, he started to play drums. He got his first paid job at the age of 15. In 1993 he was accepted into the Royal Academy of Music in Aarhus and only a year later, still a student, he started to play in the internationally recognized Klüvers Big Band. It was with this band that he recorded his first album.

After receiving his diploma in 1997, he moved to Copenhagen and was soon involved in several projects, recording and going on tours. Jesper Bodilsen, with whom he had studied at the academy, has been a close collaborator on many projects. In 2002 Lund and Bodilsen were among the musicians selected for the Jazzpar Sextet which Enrico Rava formed, as was virtuoso Italian pianist Stefano Bollani. Because the chemistry was good among them, they formed a trio the following year. Their first album, Mi ritorni in mente, was released the same year to critical acclaim and became one of the ten best selling records in Italy that year.

After tours in Italy and Scandinavia it was clear that the collaboration was going to be of a more lasting nature. They went on to play in jazz clubs and at festivals around the world. Their debut in New York City was at the legendary Birdland Club. In 2006 the trio released their second album, Gleda, which is centred on Scandinavian songs.

== Honors ==
- Ben Webster Prize, 2006
- Australian Jazz Bell Awards nomination, Best International Jazz Release for Gleda, 2006

== Discography ==
With Stefano Bollani and Jesper Bodilsen

- Mi ritorni in mente, (Stunt, 2003)
- Gleda, Songs from Scandinavia, (Stunt, 2006)
- Stone in the Water, (ECM, 2009)

With Yelena Eckemoff and Mads Vinding

- Grass Catching the Wind, (L&H, 2010)

== Collaboration ==
- 2014: Joy in Spite of Everything (ECM), Stefao Bollani

== Gallery ==
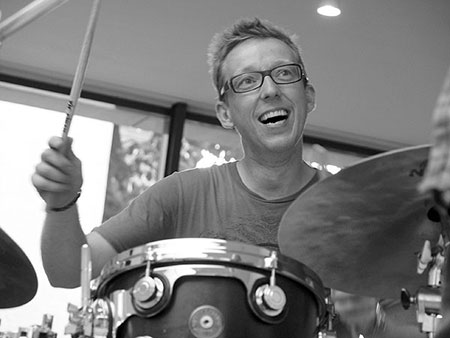

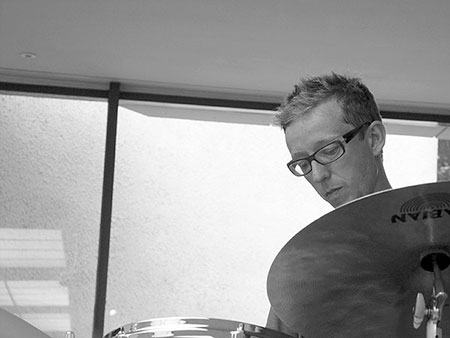

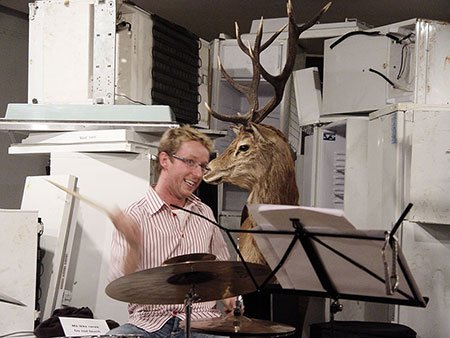

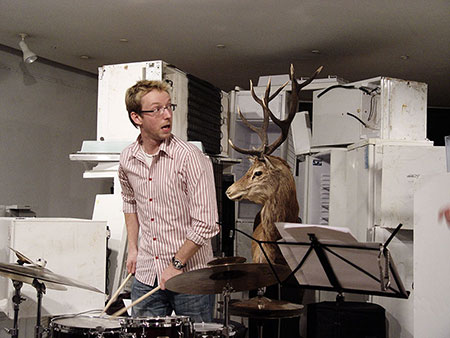
