= The Owner of the River Bank =

Live album by Cecil Taylor
- Released: 2003
- Recorded: September 10, 2000
- Venue: Talos Festival, Ruvo di Puglia, Italy
- Genre: Free jazz
- Length: 1:02:57
- Label: Enja Records; ENJ-9465 2

The Owner of the River Bank is a live album by pianist Cecil Taylor. It was recorded at the Talos Festival in Ruvo di Puglia, Italy in September 2000, and was released in 2003 by Enja Records. On the album, Taylor is joined by members of the Italian Instabile Orchestra. The concert was presented in honor of the tenth anniversary of the orchestra.

== Reception ==
Professional ratings
Review scores
Source	Rating
AllMusic	2.5/5 stars
The Guardian	3/5 stars

In a review for The Guardian, John Fordham wrote: "Parts of the performance echo Taylor's great concerto performance of the late 1960s, with the American Jazz Composers Orchestra under Michael Mantler. But this music, though showing a similarly sculptural approach to the overlaying of sounds, is less bleak, more vivacious and varied than Mantler's. It displays Taylor's fondness for mirroring his explosive piano playing with restlessly intense percussion. The leader's nervous, mercurial runs and low-register chords contrast sharply with this virtuosic orchestra's softer voices, particularly Gianluigi Trovesi's alto sax and the airborne brightness of the trumpet players. The Instabile's free-collective confidence builds rich textures of trombone smears, wriggling trumpet lines and raw sax voicings around Taylor's surging intensity. And if the leader's early roots in Ellington and Thelonious Monk are barely audible nowadays, his models still drive his faith in open music-making and a conviction that your own personal momentum, rather than a borrowed one, can drive a unique kind of swing."

Writing for All About Jazz, Jim Santella commented: "From the sounds of an orchestra warming up, to a subdued conclusion that rumbles deeply and insignificantly, Taylor's piece takes his audience on a journey through scenery that changes gradually and often... His form of communication at the piano provides instant connection with the other artists. They 'speak out' through their instruments and the leader replies. If it were that easy, then every little boy or girl could be a world-class musician. The veteran members of the Italian Instabile Orchestra... respond collectively with clarion tones and seamless phrases that knowingly communicate with musical sounds... All the rest is highly creative art that comes from the mind of Taylor, a pioneer and innovator of avant-garde fashion."

In a second article for All About Jazz, Jerry D'Souza stated: "Taylor sets up the soundscape with the strings in oleaginous flow, the horns coming in to twitter, the rhythm scattershot. The eddying eye of the timbre whirls giddily as the horns rip in with caterwaul and coil the driving forces. The diminuendo comes in, drums, a skeetering horn, the soft notes of the piano filtering in and through. The Orchestra has a penchant for using voices in full throated animation. These players' trait does not escape them, and in giving vent to it they wrap themselves around the trajectory of the instruments. Taylor splashes colour across a divergent canvas in the fourth movement, on which he gives himself plenty of room. He is poetry in motion, in free verse."

== Track listing ==
Composed by Cecil Taylor.

1. "Part 1" - 6:57
2. "Part 2" - 11:22
3. "Part 3" - 12:29
4. "Part 4" - 3:37
5. "Part 5" - 11:29
6. "Part 6" - 8:21
7. "Part 7" - 6:12

== Personnel ==
- Cecil Taylor – piano, voice
- Eugenio Colombo – flute, sopranino saxophone, voice
- Mario Schiano – soprano saxophone, alto saxophone, voice
- Gianluigi Trovesi – alto saxophone, voice
- Daniele Cavallanti – tenor saxophone, voice
- Carlo Actis Dato – bass clarinet, voice
- Alberto Mandarini – trumpet, voice
- Guido Mazzon – trumpet, voice
- Luca Calabrese – trumpet, voice
- Giancarlo Schiaffini – trombone, voice
- Lauro Rossi – trombone, voice
- Sebi Tramontana – trombone, voice
- Martin Mayes – horn, voice
- Umberto Petrin – piano, voice
- Renato Geremia - violin, voice
- Paolo Damiani - cello, voice
- Giovanni Maier - bass, voice
- Tiziano Tononi - drums, percussion, voice
- Vincenzo Mazzone - drums, timpani, voice
