= Italian jazz =

Italian jazz refers to jazz music that is played by Italian musicians, or to jazz music that is in some way connected to Italy.

== Origins ==
James Reese Europe's military concerts in France in World War I in 1919 are claimed to have introduced Europeans to a new, "syncopated" music from America. Yet, Italians had an even earlier taste of a new music from across the Atlantic when a group of "Creole" singers and dancers, billed as the "creators of the cakewalk" performed at the Eden Theater in Milan in 1904. The first real Italian jazz orchestras and ensembles, however, were formed during the 1930s by musicians such as Arturo Agazzi with his Syncopated Orchestra and Carlo Andreis with his Quartetto Andreis (CETRA, 1937-1941), enjoying immediate success. In spite of the anti-American cultural policies of the Fascist regime during the 1930s, American jazz remained popular. (Even Romano Mussolini, Benito's son, was a great jazz fan and then prominent jazz pianist.) Also, in 1935, American jazz great Louis Armstrong toured Italy with great success.

In the immediate post-World War II years jazz took off in Italy. All American post-war jazz styles, from be-bop to Free Jazz and Fusion have their equivalents in Italy. The most gifted exponents of jazz music in this period (from the 1940s to 1960s) are musicians like Gorni Kramer, Giorgio Gaslini, Lelio Luttazzi and Franco Cerri, the composer Bruno Martino and great singers like Natalino Otto, Jula de Palma, Nicola Arigliano and Johnny Dorelli. The universality of Italian culture ensured that jazz clubs would spring up throughout the peninsula, that all radio and then television studios would have jazz-based "house-bands," that Italian musicians would then start nurturing a "home grown" kind of jazz, based on European song forms, classical composition techniques and folk music (for example, in Sicily, where Enzo Rao and his group Shamal have added native Sicilian and Arab influences to American jazz).

The jazz recorded in Italy from 1912 to 1950 is practically unknown, though in those years a remarkable number of recordings were made by both Italians and foreign musicians in Italy. The records, all of them 78 rpm, are rarities for collectors, as their original matrixes were destroyed either in the devastating bombings of World War II (most of the record companies were located in Milan and Turin, two cities severely damaged by the war) or due to the foolishness of the many record company directors who sent to the rettery the remaining recordings of the period. Notwithstanding, thanks to few collectors, the best jazz recorded in Italy from 1912 to 1955 has been re-edited (by Riviera Jazz Records - www.rivierajazz.it). The story of Italian jazz, from the beginning, has been written by Adriano Mazzoletti : "Il Jazz in Italia. Dalle origini alle grandi Orchestre" and "Il Jazz in Italia. Dallo swing agli anni Sessanta", published by E.D.T., Turin. (www.edt.it). A photographic book with all the Italian musicians from the origins, “L’Italia del Jazz” have been published by Mastruzzi Editore, Rone (www.slms.it).

== Contemporary Italian jazz ==
Currently, several Italian music conservatories have jazz departments, there are dozens of jazz festivals each year in Italy, the best-known of which is the Umbria Jazz Festival, and there are prominent publications such as the journal, Musica Jazz. In Italy, today, it is virtually impossible to find a medium-sized city without a jazz club.

Notable contemporary Italian jazz Musicians include Franco Cerri, Pino Rucher, Dino Betti van der Noot, Enrico Rava, Antonello Salis, Massimo Urbani, Paolo Fresu, Enrico Intra, Stefano Bollani, Antonio Farao, Roberto Ottaviano, Dado Moroni, Aldo Romano, Stefano di Battista, Pino Presti, Tullio De Piscopo, Fabrizio Bosso, Luigi Grasso, bassists Giorgio Rosciglione, Riccardo Del Fra, Pippo Matino, Mauro Gargano, Giovanni Tommaso and Rosario Bonaccorso; Giovanni Falzone, Guido Manusardi, Giovanni Mirabassi, Enrico Pieranunzi, Mario Schiano, Gianluigi Trovesi, Pippo Lombardo, Daniele Scannapieco, Gianfranco Campagnoli, and other members and collaborators of the Italian Instabile Orchestra.

Gianluca Petrella is internationally considered one of the best young jazz trombonists. Italy has many young and promising jazz musicians including Rosario Giuliani, Claudio Quartarone, Claudio Ottaviano, Marcello Giuliani, Mauro Gargano, Francesco Bearzatti, Michel Rosciglione, Massimo Biolcati and Flavio Boltro.

Piano, solo (2007) is a biographical movie by Riccardo Milani based upon the life of Luca Flores, an Italian jazz piano player.

Richard Galliano, Michel Petrucciani, André Ceccarelli and Alfio Origlio are notable French musicians whose families come from Italy.
