= Lucilla Galeazzi =

Italian singer, born 1950

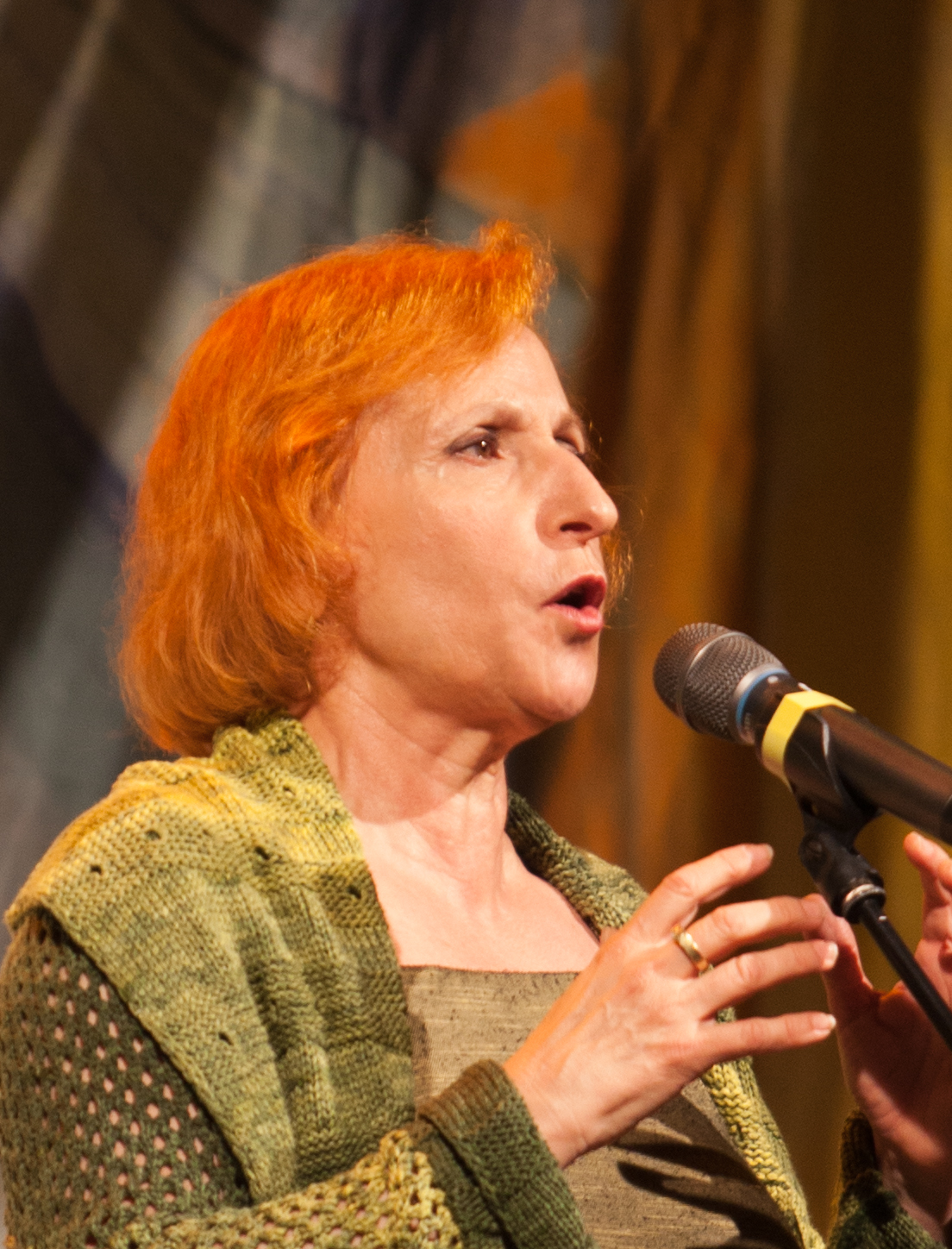
- Lucilla Galeazzi at the TFF Rudolstadt 2013

Background information
- Born: 24 December 1950 (age 75); Terni, Italy
- Genres: Italian folk music, baroque music, jazz
- Occupation: Singer
- Years active: 1977 to present
- Website: http://www.lucillagaleazzi.it

Lucilla Galeazzi is an Italian folk singer. She performs modern versions of traditional Italian folk music and has also performed internationally in jazz, baroque music and operas. In the 1970s and 80s, she was one of the best-known voices of the Italian folk revival around Giovanna Marini. She began her solo career in 1987 and has produced albums with numerous other musicians since then.

== Career ==
Galeazzi began her career as a teenager in a pop group. Later, she was influenced by her encounter with the ethnomusicologists Valentino Paparelli and Alessandro Portelli. Following this, she took singing lessons with the Japanese soprano Michiko Hiroyama and the bass singer Gianni Socci. In 1977, she became a member of Giovanna Marini's vocal quartet, with whom she recorded four albums and also performed internationally. In 1986, she appeared in Roberto de Simone's production of Pergolesi's Stabat Mater at the Naples Opera house and toured the USA.

In 1987, Galeazzi founded her first trio, Il Trillo, with Ambrogio Sparagna and Carlo Rizzo, in which she interpreted traditional folk songs in a contemporary style. In later productions, she expanded her repertoire to include baroque music and jazz. For example, she founded the Trio Rouge with jazz musicians Michel Godard and Vincent Courtois and was also a member of Christina Pluhar's baroque ensemble L'Arpeggiata for several years. Galeazzi was also a member of the Bella Ciao project, which reinterpreted workers' and partisan songs from Italy.

In 2019, she interpreted women's work songs with percussionist Carlo Rizzo, singers from Galicia and the Belgian ensemble Lalma on the album Alegria e Libertà. Galeazzi also recalled major historical themes in her music. Her production Doppio Fronte. Oratorio per la Grande Guerra commemorated the role of women in the First World War, and the production La Nave a Vapore was dedicated to the history of emigration from Italy.

== Discography ==
- 1977 Correvano coi carri (with Giovanna Marini)
- 1977 La grande madre impazzita (with Giovanna Marini)
- 1980 Cantate pour tous les jours 1 e 2 (with Giovanna Marini)
- 1984 Pour Pier Paolo Pasolini (with Giovanna Marini)
- 1986 Anninnia (with Paolo Damiani)
- 1986 Il paese con le ali (with Ambrogio Sparagna)
- 1987 Per Devozione (with Giancarlo Schiaffini)
- 1990 Cantata profana (with Giovanna Marini)
- 1992 Il Trillo (L. Galeazzi, Ambrogio Sparagna, Carlo Rizzo)
- 1993 Giofà il servo del re (with Ambrogio Sparagna)
- 1995 Invito (with Ambrogio Sparagna)
- 1995 Rock’s Airs de la lune (L. Galeazzi and Claude Barthélemy Trio)
- 1996 Mammas (with Philippe Eidel)
- 1997 Cuore di terra (Lucila Galeazzi)
- 1997 La Banda (with Michel Godard)
- 1997 La via dei Romei (with Ambrogio Sparagna)
- 1998 Honig und Asche (with Michael Riessler)
- 1999 Ali d’oro (with Michel Godard)
- 2000 Castel del Monte (with Michel Godard, Linda Bsiri, Pino Minafra, Gianluigi Trovesi, Jean-Louis Matinier, Renaud Garcia-Fons & Pierre Favre)
- 2001 Lunario (Lucilla Galeazzi)
- 2002 La Tarantella (with Christina Pluhar / L'Arpeggiata)
- 2002 Renaissance (with Philippe Eidel)
- 2004 All’improvviso (with Christina Pluhar / L'Arpeggiata)
- 2004 Trio Rouge (with Michel Godard, Vincent Courtois)
- 2005 Stagioni (Lucilla Galeazzi)
- 2006 Amore e Acciaio Lucilla Galeazzi (with M. Nardi, M. Gatti, Fisorchestra Fancelli, S. Zambataro, A. Ramous, M.Carrano)
- 2010 Sopra i tetti di Firenze (with Riccardo Tesi e Maurizio Geri)
- 2010 Ancora Bella Ciao Lucilla Galeazzi (with D. Polizzotto and S. Scatozza)
- 2011 La Tarantella / Antidotum Tarantulae (with L'Arpeggiata, Christina Pluhar and Marco Beasley)
- 2012 Il Natale dei Semplici (with N. Citarella, C. Bava ciaramella, G. Galfetti, C. Califano, Nora Tigges)
- 2013 Festa Italiana (with N. Citarella, M.Ambrosini, K.Seddiki, C.Califano, C.Rizzo, F.Turrisi, L.Teruggi, S.Napoli, A.Sparagna, A. D'Alessandro)
- 2015 Sirena dei Mantici (with Ascanio Celestini, Fisorchestra Fancelli, M. Gatti)
- 2015 Bella Ciao (with Riccardo Tesi, Andrea Salvadori, Gigi Biolcati, Elena Ledda, Ginevra Di Marco, Alessio Lega)
