= Andrea Centazzo =

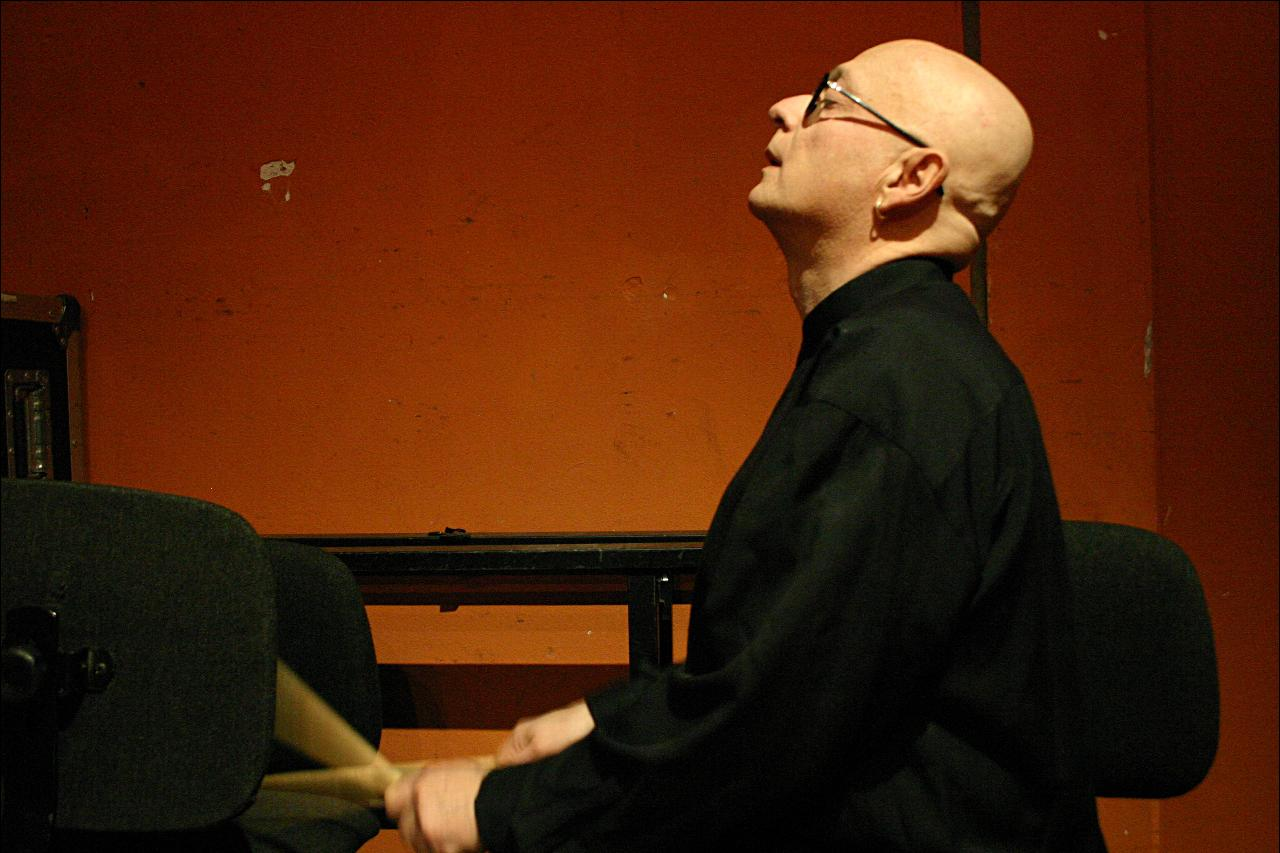
- Centazzo performing in 2006

Background information
- Born: 1948 (age 77–78); Udine, Italy
- Genres: Jazz, avant-garde jazz, free jazz
- Occupations: Musician, composer, author, educator
- Instrument: Percussion
- Years active: 1970s–present
- Label: Ictus
- Website: www.andreacentazzo.com

Andrea Centazzo (born 1948) is an Italian-born American composer, percussionist, multimedia artist and record label founder.

== Music career ==
Centazzo was born in Udine, Italy. In the 1970s he played percussion in avant-garde jazz with John Zorn, Steve Lacy, and Don Cherry, and became "a leading figure in the European avant-garde".

After 1986 he turned to video making and composed operas, film soundtracks and orchestral compositions. Since 1992, he has lived and worked in Los Angeles and has become a naturalized American citizen. He has also performed and recorded with Albert Mangelsdorff, Alvin Curran, Anthony Coleman, Evan Parker, Fred Frith, Gianluigi Trovesi, Henry Kaiser, Sylvano Bussotti, Theo Jörgensmann, Tom Cora, and Toshinori Kondo. He has conducted his own compositions with the American Youth Symphony, the L.A. Contemporary Orchestra, the Mitteleuropa Orchestra, and many ensembles. He has directed and staged his own opera compositions as well as theatrical plays by other U.S. authors.

Centazzo has also created multimedia projects that fuse acoustic instruments, electronic instruments, and video. His multimedia projects include Mandala, Eternal Traveler, Einstein's Cosmic Messengers, and R-Evolution. In more recent live performances he has given solo multimedia concerts, accompanying his own videos.

Centazzo has recorded over 60 LP's and CD's, and has composed 350 musical works of diverse types, in addition to writing eight musicology books. In 2012 the Library of the University of Bologna opened the "Fondo Andrea Centazzo" with a collection of his works and documents.

== Instrumental innovations ==
During his earlier career Centazzo developed a number of percussion instruments, including the icebell, a bowl-shaped instrument made from a bronze alloy. In his 1980 work Indian Tapes he introduced the ogororo, lokole, tampang, tubophone and square bell, based on Native American instruments.

== ICTUS ==
The ICTUS record label was founded in 1976 by Centazzo and his wife, Carla Lugli. Its first release was Clangs by Centazzo and Steve Lacy. Subsequent albums also featured Andrew Cyrille and Lol Coxhill, among others. The label was wound up after eight years owing to financial difficulties, but was revived in 1995 and again in 2006.

== Compositions ==
Major compositions by Centazzo include the multimedia opera Tina (1996), The Soul in the Mist (2006), Moon in Winter (2011), The Heart of Wax (2012), and the multimedia project Tides of Gravity (2016). This last was produced in association with LIGO, NASA and Caltech to mark the first detection of gravitational waves.

== Music albums ==
Year	Title	Collaborators
2016	Duets 7 (1977)	Evan Parker
2015	October Wind Vol. 2	Steve Lacy, Kent Carter
2015	October Wind Vol. 1	Steve Lacy, Kent Carter
2013	The Complete Recording Vol. 3 - Rituals	LaDonna Smith, Davey Williams
2013	Latecomers	Anthony Coleman, Steve Swell, Giancarlo Schiaffini
2013	Stolen Moment	Marilyn Crispell
2013	Derek Bailey Tribute Band	Chris Cochran, Marco Cappelli, Anders Nilsson
2012	In A Rainy Day	Roberto Ottaviano
2012	Bridges	Akira Sakata, Kiyoto Fujiwara
2012	Lost In June	Steve Lacy, Kent Carter
2012	The Complete Recording Vol. 2 - Halcyon Days	LaDonna Smith, Davey Williams
2012	Seven Giant Waves	
2012	Ictus World Music Collection	
2012	Mandala	
2011	Einstein's Cosmic Messengers Live	
2011	September Impressions	Janel Leppin, Mike Sebastian, T.A. Zook
2011	Escape From 2012	Don Preston
2011	Live In Concert At The Kennedy Center Washington DC	
2011	Deep Space Adventure	
2011	Snowplow	Elliott Sharp
2011	Moon In Winter	Dave Ballou, Daniel Barbiero, Nobu Stowe, Achille Succi
2009	Guitars	
2008	West Coast Trio	
2007	Double - The Complete Recording 1976 - 2007	Guido Mazzon
2007	The Warriors	Toshinori Kondo, Eugene Chadbourne
2007	Los Angeles Tapes	
2007	The German Horse	Eugene Chadbourne
2007	After The Silence	Giancarlo Cardini
2007	Eternal Traveler	
2007	Voyagers	
2007	The Soul In The Mist	Perry Robinson, Nobu Stowe
2007	Eternal Traveler	
2006	Moot & Lid	Lol Coxhill, Giancarlo Schiaffini
2006	Double 1	Guido Mazzon
2006	With Love's Light Wings	
2006	Henceforward	
2006	Double 2	Guido Mazzon
2006	A New Shock!!	Gianluigi Trovesi
2006	Fragments 2	
2006	Fragments 1	
2006	Koans: Volume One	Pierre Favre
2006	Mandala	
2006	The Heart Of Wax	
2006	World Percussion Christmas	
2006	The Shadow And The Silence	
2006	Chamber Music	
2006	Koans: Volume Three	David Moss, Steve Hubback, Jeffrey Daniel Jensen, Pere Oliver Jørgens, Brake Drum Percussion
2006	Midnight All Day	
2006	Departed Angels	
2006	South	
2006	Koans: Volume Two	David Moss, Alex Cline
2006	Sacred Shadows	
2006	Darkly Again	Lol Coxhill, Franz Koglmann
2006	Speed The Plow	
2006	Infinity Squared	Henry Kaiser
2006	Thirty Years From Monday	
2006	In Real Time	
2006	Darkly	Lol Coxhill, Franz Koglmann
2006	The Recollection	
2006	Early Music 1972-1973	
2006	Tao	Steve Lacy
2006	Spaces	
2006	Songs And Thoughts	
2006	Early Music 1970-1975	
2001	Piano Music	
2001	Il Cuore Di Cera	
2000	Situations	Lol Coxhill, Franz Koglmann, Giancarlo Schiaffini
1998	Real Time Two	Alvin Curran, Evan Parker
1997	The Secret Of Joy	
1996	Highlights From Tina	
1996	USA Concerts West	John Carter, Vinny Golia, Greg Goodman
1994	A Bosnian Requiem	
1994	Film Soundtrack - N. 3	
1993	Sea	
1993	Sea Land People Seasons	
1993	Seasons	
1993	Land	
1993	People	
1992	Living Pictures	
1991	Theatres	
1990	Cetacea - L'Odissea Dei Suoni Perduti	
1989	Il presente prossimo venturo	
1989	Visions	
1989	Omaggio A Pier Paolo Pasolini	
1987	Jacques E Il Suo Padrone	Milan Kundera
1985	Tiare	
1985	L'Altro Lato	Carlo Actis Dato, Furio Chirico, Luigi Venegoni
1984	Shock!!	Gianluigi Trovesi
1983	Cjant - Concerto Per Piccola Orchestra	
1982	Solo De La Passion Selon Sade	Sylvano Bussotti
1981	Percussion Interchanges	David Moss, Alex Cline, Creative Music Studio
1980	Indian Tapes	
1979	Environment For Sextet	John Zorn, Eugene Chadbourne, Tom Cora, Toshinori Kondo, Polly Bradfield
1979	Protocol	Henry Kaiser, Toshinori Kondo
1979	The Bay	Rova Saxophone Quartet
1979	Velocities	LaDonna Smith, Davey Williams
1979	Moot	Lol Coxhill, Giancarlo Schiaffini
1978	Dec 29 1978 Udine	Eugene Chadbourne
1978	U.S.A. Concerts	
1978	Real Time	Alvin Curran, Evan Parker
1977	Dialogues	Pierre Favre
1977	Trio Live	Steve Lacy, Kent Carter
1977	Drops	Derek Bailey
1977	Ratsorock	Paolo Bordini, Franco Feruglio
1976	Duetti	Guido Mazzon
1976	Clangs	Steve Lacy
1976	FM Frequenze Modulate (Le Nuove Tendenze Della Musica Italiana)	Mario Guarnera, Roberto Cacciapaglia, Guido Mazzon, Gaetano Liguori, Luigi Grechi
1976	Freedom Out !	Gunter Hampel, Frederic Rabold, Bruno Tommaso, Martin Bues, Thomas Keyserling
1976	Solos 6/5/76	
1975	Fragmentos	
1974	Ictus	

== Filmography ==
- 1986 Romance
- 1992 Obiettivo indiscreto
- 1995 Shadow of a Kiss (TV movie)
- 1995 Star Struck
- 1999 I Karaoke (short)
- 2001 The Circle (short)
- 2009 La Corsa (short)
- 2009 Mei Mei (short)
- 2009 Toto Forever (short)
- 2010 Desire Street
- 2013 Ni Jing: Thou Shalt Not Steal
- 2015 Floating Melon
- 2016 Advent (film)

== Books ==
- Andrea Centazzo (1979). Guida agli strumenti a percussione: storia e uso. Il formichiere.
- Andrea Centazzo (1982). Strumenti per fare musica. Gammalibri.
- Andrea Centazzo (1982). La batteria: stili, protagonisti e tecniche. F. Muzzio. ISBN 978-88-7021-198-6.
- Andrea Centazzo (1995). Smart drumming: metodo per batteria. Nuovo Carisch. ISBN 978-88-7207-143-4.
