= Carlo Rizzo (percussionist) =

Italian percussionist and composer, born 1955

- Born: 1955 (age 70–71); Mestre/Veneto, Italy
- Genres: Avant-garde jazz, Italian folk music, contemporary music
- Occupations: Musician, composer
- Instruments: Tambourine, percussion
- Years active: 1983–present
- Website: www.odoensemble.com/en/carlo-rizzo

Carlo Rizzo is an Italian music composer and percussionist who specializes in the tamburello, a southern Italian form of the tambourine. Living in France since the 1980s, he has played internationally with numerous musicians of avant-garde jazz, traditional as well as ancient music and is also known for his compositions of French contemporary music.

== Life and career ==
Rizzo studied painting and sculpture at the Academy of Fine Arts in Rome until 1979. During this time, he also learnt the technique of playing the jingled frame drum tamburello with Alfio Antico and the Neapolitan tammorra with Raffaele Inserra, both folk musicians from southern Italy. He perfected his skills as a self-taught musician and was soon performing with various Italian traditional music groups. In 1983, he made a guest appearance as a musician in Italian songwriter Giovanna Marini's Il Regalo dell' Imperatore in France, where he moved the following year. He first lived in Paris and later in Grenoble.

In 1988 Rizzo taught percussion at the Conservatoire National in Réunion and later in 1994 at the Rueil-Malmaison conservatoire. Between 1991 and 1993, he also lectured about traditional Italian music at the University of Paris. Further, Rizzo developed two of his own forms of the tamburello (Tamburello Politimbrico and Tamburello Multitimbrico), which he manufactures himself. Since 1988, Rizzo has founded or participated in about thirty ensembles, performing both jazz as well as traditional and contemporary music. He has played with musicians including Gianluigi Trovesi, Rita Marcotulli, Jean-Jacques Goldman and Montserrat Figueras. Starting in 1992, he has also appeared as a solo artist, performing on percussion and singing at the same time. Further, he has performed at concerts and festivals throughout Europe, the USA, the Caribbean and Latin America, Asia and Africa. His own compositions of contemporary music have mainly been commissioned by French cultural organizations or festivals.

== Reception and distinction ==
As a member of Lucilla Galeazzi's trio Il Trillo, Rizzo was called a "virtuoso percussion player" in the Rough Guide on music from Italy. In 1999, The Economist reported about the International Percussion Biennale in Conakry, Guinea, where Rizzo was featured in a duo with Senegalese master player on the talking drum Pape M'baye. The article commented: weaving "their rhythms around each other, it sounded like a conversation." In 2015, the album Stupor mundi of ancient music by Vincent Klink, Patrick Bebelaar, Michel Godard, Gavino Murgia and Carlo Rizzo was awarded the German Record Critics' Award, an annual German prize presented for achievements in recorded music.

In 2001, Rizzo was distinguished as a Knight (Chevalier) of the Ordre des Arts et des Lettres of the French Republic.

== Discography ==
- Luc Ferrari: Matin et Soir, 1989
- La Grande Bande Des Cornemuses, 1990
- Il Trillo, 1992
- Michael Riessler: Héloise, 1993
- Journal de Bord - 38è Rugissant, 1993
- Tanz Folkfest Rudolstadt, 1993
- Anthologie de la Chanson Française - La Tradition, 1994
- André Velter: Le Grand Passage, 1994
- Valentin Clastrier: Le Bûcher des Silences, 1994
- Clastrier - Riessler - Rizzo: Palude, 1995
- Michael Riessler: Tentations d’ Abelard, 1995
- Ambrogio Sparagna: Invito, 1995
- The Justin Vali Trio, 1995
- Antonio Placer: La Danza De Los Azares, 1995
- Micrologus: d’ Amor Cantando, 1995
- Édouard Glissant: Les Poétiques, 1996
- Schérzo Orientale, 1997
- Ambrogio Sparagna: La Via Dei Romei, 1997
- J. P. Yvert - J. Mayoud: Fragment de Routes, 1997
- Eric Montbel: Ulysse, 1997
- Carlo Rizzo - Ibrahim Jaber: Rituel Du Feu, 1997
- Vents d’Est: Ballades pour une mer qui chante, 1997
- Antonio Placer: Un poco cielo, un poco tierra, 1998
- Italie : Musiques Populaires d’Aujourd ‘hui, 1998
- Michael Riessler: Honig und Asche, 1998
- Rita Marcotulli: The Woman Next Door, 1998
- Toscane, 1999
- Paolo Damiani, Carlo Mariani, Michele Rabbia, Sandro Satta, Carlo Rizzo: Mediana, 1999
- Dhafer Youssef: Malak, 1999
- Trio Chemirani, Montanaro, Rizzo: Alazar, 2000
- Gianluigi Trovesi Nonet: Round About a Midsummer's Dream, 2000
- Jean-Jacques Goldman: Chansons Pour Les Pieds, 2001
- Une Anche Passe: Nigriz, 2002
- Jean-Luc Fillon: Oboa, 2003, mit João Paulo
- Montserrat Figueras: Lux Feminae (900-1600), 2006
- Eugenio Colombo, Michel Godard, Carlo Rizzo: Ciaobelleragazze, 2006
- Patrick Bebelaar: Pantheon, 2007
- Henry Fourès, Carlo Rizzo, Beñat Achiary, Célébration du contre-jour, Radio France, Harmonia Mundi, 2007.
- Vincent Klink/Patrick Bebelaar: Stupor Mundi, 2014, with Michel Godard and Gavino Murgia

== Compositions ==
- Tammurriata, 1991
- Poliritmia, 1992
- La Fête des Reugnes, 1993
- Toscane, 1998
- Canto Ritmico, 2000
- Lumiera, 2000
- Les Trans(e)tambourins, 2003
- Pas de Géants , 2008
- Da vicino e da lontano, 2009)
- Du signe au son, 2009
- Rhytmhus, 2010

== Literature ==
- Wolf Kampmann: Mister Tambourine Man: Der Perkussionist Carlo Rizzo. In: Neue Zeitschrift für Musik (1991-), vol. 157, no. 6, (Schlag-Werk) Nov.–Dez. 1996, pp. 34–36 (in German)
- Pirozzolo, Fabio (2014). "Central and Southern Italian Tambourines: Between Tradition and Innovation". www.proquest.com.
