= Dino Betti van der Noot =

Italian jazz composer (born 1936)

Dino Betti van der Noot (born 1936) is an Italian jazz composer.

== Biography ==
Van der Noot was born in Rapallo. His mother and cousin were classical pianists. He studied at Scuola Musicale of Pavia, 1946–51; in 1959 studied privately in Milan and in the 1970s at Berklee College of Music In Italy, he led combos from 1957–1960, but was not active in music in the 1960s. He led an amateur big band from 1969–1972 and a professional big band in 1982 and in 1987 in New York City. He is chairman of B Communications, an advertising agency in Milan.

In his bands, he worked with Andrea Dulbecco, Ares Tavolazzi, Bill Evans, Bob Cunningham, Danny Gottlieb, David Friedman, Donald Harrison, Hugo Heredia, Famoudou Don Moye, Franco Ambrosetti, Giancarlo Schiaffini, Gianluigi Trovesi, John Taylor, Jonathan Scully, Joyce Yuille, Luis Agudo, Paul Bley, Paul Motian, Sandro Cerino, Steve Swallow, Tiziano Tononi, and Vincenzo Zitello.

"His compositions are narratives rife with colour, ranging from the boldest hues to the most subtle and revealing a sensitive, inventive melodist and lapidarian master of orchestral skills."

== Awards and honors ==
- Record of the Year, Musica Jazz Critics' Poll (1987, 1989, 2013, 2015)
- Record of the Year, Dischi Critics' Poll (1989)
- Record of the Decade, Musica and Dischi Critics' polls (1989)
- Jazz Composer of the Year, Musica Jazz Critics' Poll (2007, 2009)
- Record of the Year, Musica Jazz Critics' Poll, The Stuff Dreams Are Made On (2013)
- Record of the Year, Musica Jazz Critics' Poll, Notes Are But the Wind (2015);

== Discography ==
- Basement Big Band, 1977
- A Midwinter Night's Dream, 1983
- Here Comes Springtime, 1985
- They Cannot Know, 1987
- A Chance for a Dance, 1987–88
- Space Blossoms, 1988–89
- Ithaca/Ithaki, 2003–05
- The Humming Cloud, 2007
- God Save the Earth, 2009
- September's New Moon, 2011
- The Stuff Dreams Are Made On, 2013
- Notes Are But Wind, 2015
- Ou Sont les Notes D’Antan ? ,2017
- Two ships in the night ,2018
- Let Us Recount Our Dreams ,2023

== Bibliography ==
- In the U.S.: Brown, Croan, Ira Gitler, Nat Hentoff, Iannapollo, Ilwood, Jeske, Art Lange, Murphy, Palmer, Pareles, Porter, Shepard, Tesser, Watrous, Whitehea
- In Italy: Aliperto, Barazzetta, Belgiojoso, Candini, Cane, Casalini, Cerchiari, Corbetta, Di Fronzo, Di Termini, Favot, Fayenz, Franchi, Franchini, Franco, Gatto, Giamatti Fubini, Gianolio, Gioacchini, Maletto, Mannucci, Parmeggiani, Paternoster, Poggio, Polillo, Pollacci, Pollastri, Sabelli, Schiozzi, Serra, Taormina, Viganò, Vita, Zaccagnini, Zanzi, Zorman
- In France: Berger, Bourdin, Quénum
- Musica Jazz – Gennaio 2010 - n. 1
- Corriere della Sera - 25 Ottobre 2009 - n. 253
- Il Sole 24 Ore – 22 Novembre 2009 - n. 322
- Corriere della Sera (magazine) - Luglio 2005
- Il Giornale – Giugno 2008
- Leonard Feather & Ira Gitler: The Biographical Encyclopedia of Jazz, Oxford University Press, New York, 1999, page 59.
- Compact - Juin 1989
- The Journal News - January 29, 1987
- Down Beat - February 1987
- Cadence - February 1987
- The New York Times - September 8, 1987
- Avvenire - 14 Novembre 1986
- The Boston Globe - November 13, 1986
- USA Today - December 19, 1986
- Jazz Hot - Avril 1984
