= Gianni Lenoci =

Italian jazz pianist and composer (1963–2019)

- Born: 6 June 1963
- Died: 30 September 2019 (aged 56)
- Genre: Jazz
- Occupations: Musician, composer
- Instrument: Piano
- Years active: 1990s–2019

Gianni Lenoci (6 June 1963 – 30 September 2019) was an Italian jazz pianist and composer.

== Life and career ==
Lenoci studied with pianists Paul Bley and Mal Waldron. A reviewer of his 1995 album Existence commented on Lenoci's "fascination with Paul Bley's scalar investigation – he rides his way through to the center of the melody in each case to find the improvising scale, and when he does, he creates arpeggios and skittering skeins of notes to cover it up while opening another door". Lenoci died on 30 September 2019. In 2021, his book Alchimia dell'istante. Riflessioni e paradossi di un improvvisatore (Alchemy of the Moment: Reflections and Paradoxes of an Improviser) was published posthumously by Haze-Auditorium Edizioni. The book brings together his reflections on music and improvisation.

== Discography ==
An asterisk (*) indicates that the year is that of release.

=== As leader/co-leader ===
Year recorded	Title	Label	Personnel/Notes
1995	Existence	Splasc(h)	Trio, with Augusto Mancinelli (bass), Roberto Gatto (drums)
1996*	Blues Waltz	Splasc(h)	Trio, with Bruno Tommaso (bass), Antonio Di Lorenzo (drums)
1998*	Franco Degrassi Gianni Lenoci	ASC	Duo, with Franco Degrassi
1998	All in Love Is Fair	Splasc(h)	Trio, with Bruno Tommaso (bass), Antonio Di Lorenzo (drums)
2003	Sur Une Balançoire	Ambiances Magnétiques	Duo, with Joëlle Léandre (bass, vocals)
2006*	Ergskkem	Silta	Trio, with Markus Stockhausen (trumpet, flugelhorn), Giorgio Dini (bass)
2009	Ephemeral Rhizome	Evil Rabbit	Piano solo
2010*	Reciprocal Uncles	LongSong	Duo, with Gianni Mimmo (soprano sax)
2011*	Secret Garden	Silta	Quartet, with Gaetano Partipilo (alto sax), William Parker (bass), Marcello Magliocchi (drums)
2012	Plaything	NoBusiness	Trio, with Kent Carter (bass), Bill Elgart (drums)
2013*	Empty Chair	Silta	With Vittorio Gallo (soprano sax), Taylor Ho Bynum (cornet), Pasquale Gadaleta (bass), Giacomo Mongelli (drums)
2013*	Morton Feldman – For Bunita Marcus (1985)	Amirani	Solo piano

=== As sideman ===
Year recorded	Leader	Title	Label
1991	Massimo Urbani	Round About Max with Strings	Sentemo
1999	Eugenio Colombo	Guida Blu	Splasc(h)
2002*	Carlo Actis Dato	Entomology	Setola di Maiale
2009*	Stefano Luigi Mangia	Painting on Wood (Pittura Su Legno)	Leo
