= Sebi Tramontana =

Italian jazz trombonist (born 1960)

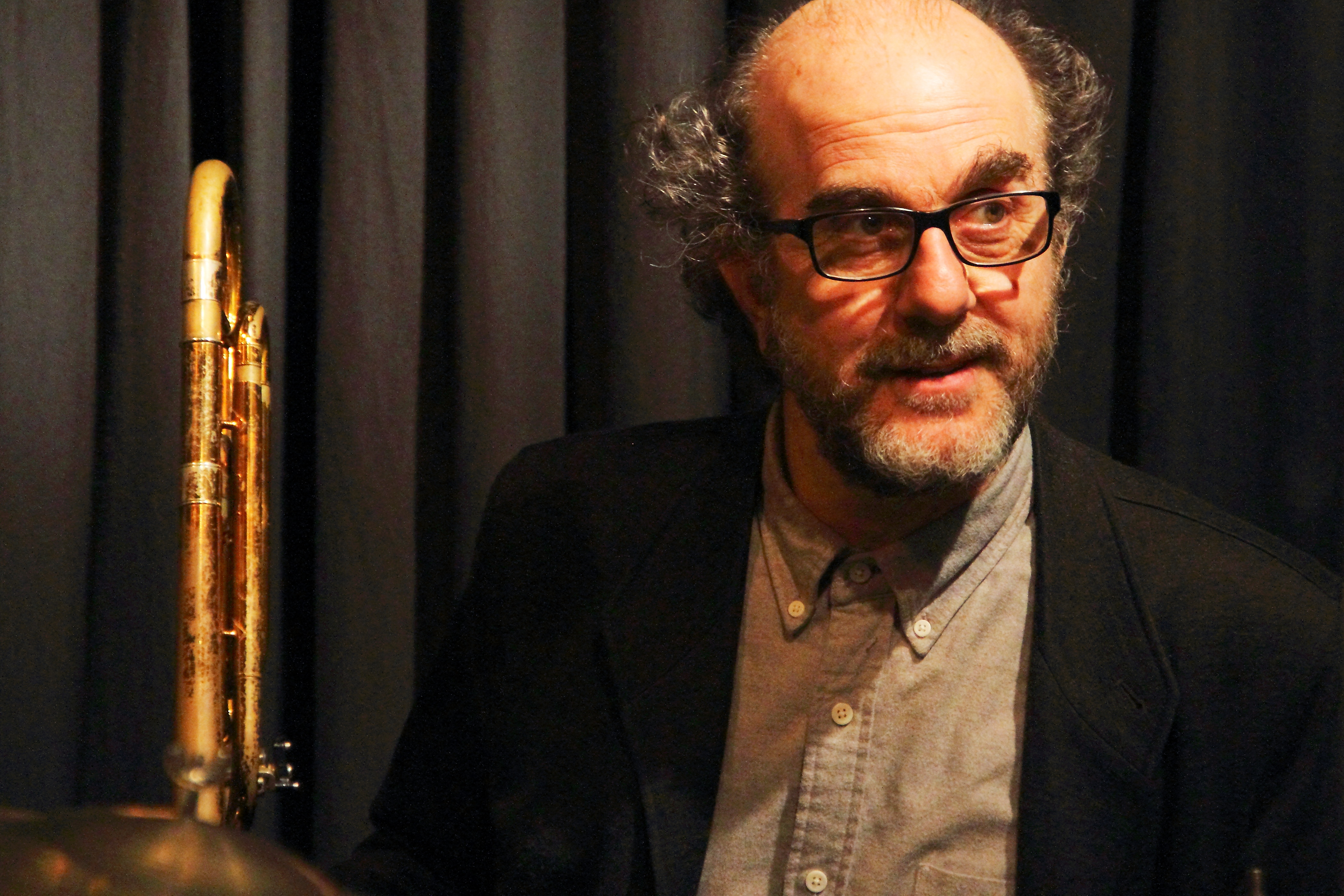

Sebi Tramontana (born December 12, 1960, in Rosolini, Sicili) is a jazz trombonist most often associated with avant-garde jazz and free improvisation music. A member of the Italian Instabile Orchestra, Tramontana has also recorded with such musical artists as Jeb Bishop, Joëlle Léandre, Mario Schiano, and Carlos Zingaro.

== Discography ==
- Il Giorno del Santo. WIND 12. 1992.
- Sebi Tramontana; Georg Graewe (1998). Schz!. Splasc(h).

=== With the Italian Instabile Orchestra ===
- Live In Noci And Rive-De Gier. Leo. 1991.
- Skies of Europe. ECM. 1994.
- European Concerts '94-'97. Nel Jazz. 1997.
- Litania Sibilante. Enja. 2000.
- Previsioni del Tempo: Forecast. Imprint. 2002.
- Featuring Cecil Taylor (2004). The Owner of the Riverbank. Enja Justin Time.

=== As contributor ===
- Stefano Maltese Orchestra (1986). Music From the Island. Trademark Experience in Art.
- Gioconda Cilio (1987). Deep Inside. Splasc(h).
- Mario Schiano; Ganelin Tarasov; Vladimir Chekasin; Sebi Tramontana. Red and Blue.
- Stefano Maltese (1989). Amor Fati. Splasc(h).
- Mario Schiano (1990). Unlike. Splasc(h).
- Antonio Moncada (1991). The True Story of Twelve Colors. Splasc(h).
- Mario Schiano (1994). She Was Sitting in the First Row. MS.
- Georg Graewe Quintet (1996). Concert in Berlin 1996.
- Mario Schiano (1996). Social Security (Live). Victo.
- Ekkehard Jost (1998). Some Other Tapes. Fish.
- Joëlle Léandre; Sebi Tramontana (1999). E'Vero. Leo Records.
- Jeb Bishop (2002). Chicago Defenders. Wobbly Rail.
- Carlos Zingaro (2002). The Chicken Check in Complex. Leo Records.
- Mario Schiano; Giancarlo Schiaffini; Bruno Tommaso; Sebi Tramontana (2002). Free Jazz at the Philharmonic. Splasc(h).
- Corbett vs Dempsey (2006). Eye and Ear: Artist-Musician. Atavistic Records.
- Joëlle Léandre (2006). Joëlle Léandre at the LeMans Jazz Festival. Leo Records.
