= Pino Minafra =

Italian trumpeter and flugelhorn player (born 1951)

Pino Minafra (born 21 Juli 1951 in Ruvo di Puglia) is an Italian trumpeter and flugelhorn player who is associated with free improvisation, avant-garde jazz. A founding member of the Italian Instabile Orchestra, Minafra has recorded with such musicians as Gianluigi Trovesi, Mario Schiano, Han Bennink, Ernst Reijseger, Willem Breuker and Michel Godard.

== Discography ==
- Colori. Splasc(h). 1985.
- Pino Minafra; Vittorino Curci; Carlo Actis Dato (1989). L' Invenzione Del Verso Sfuso. Splasc(h).
- Quella Mezza Dozzina. Splasc(h). 1989.
- Concert for Ibla. Splasc(h). 1991.
- Sudori. Victo. 1995.
- Canto Libero. Victo. 2001.
- Terronia. Enja Records. 2005.

=== As contributor ===
- Mario Schiano; Peter Kowald; Gianluigi Trovesi; Paul Lovens; Pino Minafra; Radu Malfatti (1989). Benefit Concert to Repurchase the Pendulum for Mr. Foucault. Splasc(h).
- Italian Instabile Orchestra (1991). Live In Noci And Rive-De Gier. Leo Records.
- Ernst Reijseger; Han Bennink; Pino Minafra (1991). Noci...Strani Frutti. Leo Records.
- Gianluigi Trovesi Octet (1992). From G to G. Soul Note.
- The Giuseppe Guarrella Project (1994). Live! Festival Ibleo del Jazz. CMC.
- Italian Instabile Orchestra (1994). Skies of Europe. ECM.
- Vincenzo Lanzo (1995). Rondonella Project. Leo Records.
- Les Hommes Armés. Soul Note. 1997.
- Italian Instabile Orchestra (1997). European Concerts '94-'97. Nel Jazz.
- La Banda (1998). La Banda: Traditional Italian Banda & Jazz. Enja Records.
- Willem Breuker Kollektief (2000). Celebrating 25 Years on the Road. BVHaast.
- Italian Instabile Orchestra (2000). Litania Sibilante. Enja Records.
- Michel Godard (2001). Castel del Monte. Enja Records.
- Italian Instabile Orchestra (2002). Previsioni del Tempo: Forecast. Imprint Records.
- Italian Instabile Orchestra; Cecil Taylor (2004). The Owner of the Riverbank. Enja Justin Time.
