= Richard Benson =

Richard Benson may refer to:

- Richard Benson (MP), English Member of Parliament for Ludlow, 1604
- Richard Meux Benson (1824–1915), priest in the Church of England
- Richard Benson (photographer) (1943–2017), American photographer
- Richard Benson (musician) (1955–2022), English-Italian musician
- Rich Benson (born 1967), American tennis player
- Avenger (pulp-magazine character) or Richard Henry Benson

== See also ==
- Dick Benson (disambiguation)
