= Mark Stanley (disambiguation) =

Mark Stanley (born 1988) is an English actor.

Mark Stanley or Marc Stanley may also refer to:

- Mark Stanley (musician) (born 1968), American multi-instrumentalist and songwriter
- Marc Stanley, American lawyer and U.S. ambassador to Argentina
