= Patrick Bebelaar =

German musician and composer

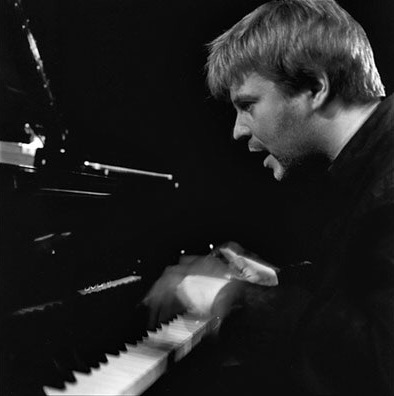
- Born: 6 March 1971 (age 55); Trier, Germany
- Citizenship: German
- Occupations: pianist, composer and jazz musician
- Website: bebelaar.de

Patrick Josef Bebelaar (born 6 March 1971) is a German musician and composer. He is positioned as "inventive pianist between jazz and classical music".

== Life and work ==
=== Music ===
Bebelaar began piano lessons with Georg Ruby and Richie Beirach and after graduating from high school in 1993 he studied at the State University of Music and Performing Arts Stuttgart with Paul Schwarz. Along with Frank Kroll and Bernd Settelmayer he is a member of the group Limes X. For many years, he worked together with musicians such as Michel Godard, Herbert Joos, Joe Fonda, Prakash Maharaj, Vikash Maharaj, Hakim Ludin, Friedemann Dähn, Vincent Klink, Günter "Baby" Sommer, Ulrich Süße and Mike Rossi. He had performances in Europe, South Africa, North America and India.

His music and compositions are imbued with free jazz and ethno jazz. Folkloric themes play a role as well as free improvisation. His work Pantheon builds on the Mass in B minor by Johann Sebastian Bach. In 2001, Bebelaar composed the commissioned work "Point of View" for the Internationale Bachakademie Stuttgart, followed by compositions for the city of Esslingen and many more.

=== Social activism and teaching ===
Since 2000, he has been organizing master classes and concerts as a volunteer in the townships of South Africa, together with Darius Brubeck, the son of Dave Brubeck. They have been teaching and playing in various young people's projects. In addition, Bebelaar teaches at the University of KwaZulu-Natal and Cape Town. As part of the 2010 World Cup and financed by Daimler, Bebelaar performed with colleagues in South Africa. In Germany he held a teaching position at the State University of Music and Performing Arts Stuttgart from 2006 to 2012. Since the summer term of 2013, Bebelaar has been teaching jazz / pop at the University of Sacred Music in Tübingen. He has held the office of vice-rector there since February 2014.

=== Reviews ===
The press describes his style:

- "... sparkling technique, challenging musical concepts and gut-churning virtuosity.", Daily News Durban
- "... he compresses his performance into complex nested rhythms and sharply pointed harmonies. In unbridled ecstasy, Bebelaar develops the exuberant virtuous romantic vocabulary of Scriabin and Rachmaninow to new heights.", Die Rheinpfalz
- "... avant-garde piano style and respectful continuation of tradition.", Stuttgarter Zeitung
- "... churchy piano (in the sense of both Bach and Abdullah Ibrahim) gives these melodies emotional intimacy and honesty.", The New York City Jazz Record

== Prizes, Awards and Scholarships ==
Bebelaar received several grants from the University of Natal, Durban (1995/96), the Kunststiftung Baden-Württemberg (1996) and from the Hermann Haake Foundation (1996). In 2000 Bebelaar was awarded the Jazz Award Baden-Württemberg. In 2003 he received the "Special Award" of the Kingdom of Kwazulu Natal for his teaching activities. The South African Association for Jazz Education awarded him in 2005 for his "Outstanding Service to Jazz Education". In 2008 he was an Artist in Residence at the University of Cape Town (2008). The CD Three Seasons (HGBS 2014 with Günter "Baby" Sommer and Michel Godard) was awarded "Album of the Year 2014" by The New York City Jazz Record. His production 'Stupor Mundi' with Michel Godard, Vincent Klink, Gavino Murgia and Carlo Rizzo was awarded The German Record Critics' Award, an annual German prize presented for achievement in recorded music.

== Discography ==
- Raga (dml-records, 1996, with Frank Kroll, Prakash Maharaj, Subhash Maharaj, Vikash Maharaj)
- Never Thought It Could Happen (dml-records, 1999, with Frank Kroll, Willi Witte, Henrik Mumm)
- Passion (dml-records, 2000, with Herbert Joos, Bernd Settelmayer, Frank Kroll, Fried Dähn, Jo Ambros, Günter Lenz)
- You Never Lose an Island (dml-records, 2002, with Michel Godard, Herbert Joos, Frank Kroll)
- Point of View (dml-records, 2003, with Frank Kroll, Michel Godard, Prakash Maharaj, Subhash Maharaj, Vikash Maharaj)
- The Beauty of Darkness (dml-records, 2005, with Herbert Joos)
- Pantheon (dml-records, 2007, with Fried Dähn, Michel Godard, Herbert Joos, Frank Kroll, Carlo Rizzo)
- Live at the Baxter (Captown Sound, Südafrika, 2009, with Mike Rossi, Ulrich Süße)
- Gegenwelten – Abgesang (dml-records, 2009, with Michel Godard, Herbert Joos, Frank Kroll, Gavino Murgia)
- The Four O'Clock Session (dml-records, 2009, with Joe Fonda, Mike Rabinowitz)
- Between Shadow and Light (Double Moon Records 2012, with Joe Fonda and Herbert Joos)
- Book of Family Affairs (HGBS 2013, with Günter Lenz and Herbert Joos)
- Studio Konzert (neuklang 2014, with Pierre Favre, Günter Lenz and Frank Kroll)
- Three Seasons (HGBS 2014, with Günter "Baby" Sommer and Michel Godard)
- Stupor Mundi (dml-records 2014, with Michel Godard, Gavino Murgia, Carlo Rizzo and Vincent Klink)
- Reflection in Your Eyes (neuklang 2015, with Pierre Favre, Günter Lenz and Frank Kroll)
- High in the Clouds (ArtBeat Music 2015, with Vladimir Goloukhov)
- Touch (dml-records 2017, with Michel Godard, Ulrich Süße and Mike Rossi)

== General references ==
- Jürgen Wölfer Jazz in Deutschland – Das Lexikon. Alle Musiker und Plattenfirmen von 1920 bis heute. Höfen: Hannibal Verlag 2008, ISBN 978-3-85445-274-4
- Lewis Porter (Hrsg.) Encyclopedia of Jazz Musicians
