= Bruno Tommaso =

Italian jazz musician and composer

Bruno Tommaso (born 1946) is an Italian jazz double-bass player and composer, the cousin of fellow double-bass player Giovanni Tommaso. The first president of the Italian Association of Jazz Musicians and a founding member of the Italian Instabile Orchestra, Tommaso has performed with such musicians as Enrico Rava, Mario Schiano, Franco d'Andrea, Eugenio Colombo and Enrico Pieranunzi, among others.

== Discography ==
- Su Un Tema Di Jerome Kern. Splasc(h). 1981.
- Barga Jazz. Splasc(h). 1987.
- Steamboat Bill, Jr. Imprint. 1998.
- Ulisse E L'Ombra. Imprint. 2000. w/ Roberto Rossi
- Original Soundtrack For Charles And Mary, Onyx Jazz Club, Matera, 2013. With Riccardo Parrucci, fl, Fabrizio Desideri, Rossano Emili, sax - cl, Marco Bartalini, flg, Gloria Merani, Marco Domenichelli, vl, Flaminia Zanelli, vla, Elisabetta Casapieri, vc, Marco Cattani, gtr, Andrea Pellegrini, p, Giacomo Riggi, vib, Nino Pellegrini, cb, Paolo Corsi, dr. Bruno Tommaso, compos., dir.

=== With the Italian Instabile Orchestra ===
- Live In Noci And Rive-De Gier. Leo Records. 1991.
- Skies of Europe. ECM. 1994.
- European Concerts '94-'97. Nel Jazz. 1997.
- Litania Sibilante. Enja Records. 2000.
- Previsioni del Tempo: Forecast. Imprint Records. 2002.
- Featuring Cecil Taylor (2004). The Owner of the Riverbank. Enja Justin Time.

=== As contributor ===
- Franco d'Andrea; Modern Art Trio (2008) [1970]. Modern Art Trio/Franco D'Andrea. Vedette/Dejavu.
- Mario Schiano (1973). On the Waiting List. Atavistic Records.
- Mario Schiano (1973). Sud. Splasc(h).
- Enrico Pieranunzi (1975). Jazz A Confronto. Horo.
- Mario Schiano (1977). De Dé. Splasc(h).
- Giorgio Gaslini (1987). Multipli. Soul Note.
- Marche Jazz Orchestra, "Dies Irae", Philology, (1989)
- Eugenio Colombo (1990). Giada. Splasc(h).
- Gianni Lenoci (1990). Blues Waltz. Splasc(h).
- Mario Schiano (1992). Original Sins: Unreleased, 1967-1970. Splasc(h).
- Enrico Rava (1993). Rava, L'Opera Va. Blue.
- Italian String Trio (1993). From Groningen to Mulhouse. Splasc(h).
- European Music Orchestra (1994). Guest. Soul Note.
- Mario Schiano (1994). Meetings. Splasc(h).
- Milagro Quintet (1994). Old Works in Blue. Splasc(h).
- Massimo Ciolli (1994). Transchiantigiana Express. SA Jazz.
- Mario Schiano; Bruno Tommaso; Giancarlo Schiaffini (1998). (To Be Continued...). Discoteca di Stato.
- La Banda (1998). La Banda: Traditional Italian Banda & Jazz. Enja Records.
- Gianni Lenoci Trio (1998). All in Love Is Fair. Splasc(h).
- Gianluigi Trovesi (1999). Around Small Fairy Tales. Soul Note.
- Eugenio Colombo (1999). Guida Blu. Splasc(h).
- Piero Umiliani (2000). Musica Elettronica, Vol. 1. Easy Tempo.
- Gianluigi Trovesi (2000). Round About a Midsummer's Dream. Enja Records.
- Eugenio Colombo (2000). Tales of Love and Death. Leo Records.
- Mario Schiano; Giancarlo Schiaffini; Bruno Tommaso; Sebi Tramontana (2002). Free Jazz at the Philharmonic. Splasc(h).
- Civica Jazz Band (2002). Italian Jazz Graffiti. Soul Note.
- Mirco Mariottini (2005). Nugae. Splasc(h).
- The European Union Jazz Youth Orchestra (2005). The European Union Jazz Youth Orchestra. European Commission.
