= Italian Instabile Orchestra =

Experimental big band

The Italian Instabile Orchestra (IIO) is an eighteen-piece experimental big band that performs orchestral jazz and avant-garde jazz. Its members include Alberto Mandarini, Bruno Tommaso, Carlo Actis Dato, Daniele Cavallanti, Eugenio Colombo, Giancarlo Schiaffini, Gianluigi Trovesi, Giorgio Gaslini, Giovanni Maier, Guido Mazzon, Mario Schiano, Martin Mayes, Paolo Damiani, Pino Minafra, Sebi Tramontana, Tiziano Tononi, Umberto Petrin, and Vincenzo Mazzone.

The orchestra was founded in 1990 to perform at the Festival di Noci. One of the original members, pianist Giorgio Gaslini, later left the orchestra. Some guest musicians that have performed or recorded with them include Cecil Taylor, Willem Breuker and Lester Bowie.

== Discography ==
- Live in Noci and Rive-De Gier (Leo, 1991)
- Skies of Europe (ECM, 1994)
- European Concerts '94–'97 (Neljazz, 1997)
- Litania Sibilante (Enja, 2000)
- Previsioni del Tempo: Forecast (Imprint, 2002)
- The Owner of the River Bank (Enja/Justin Time, 2004) with Cecil Taylor
- Creative Orchestra: Bolzano 2007, (Rai Trade, 2010)
- Totally Gone (Goodfellas/Rai Trade, 2010)

== See also ==
- List of experimental big bands
