= Vincent Klink =

German chef, restaurateur and author

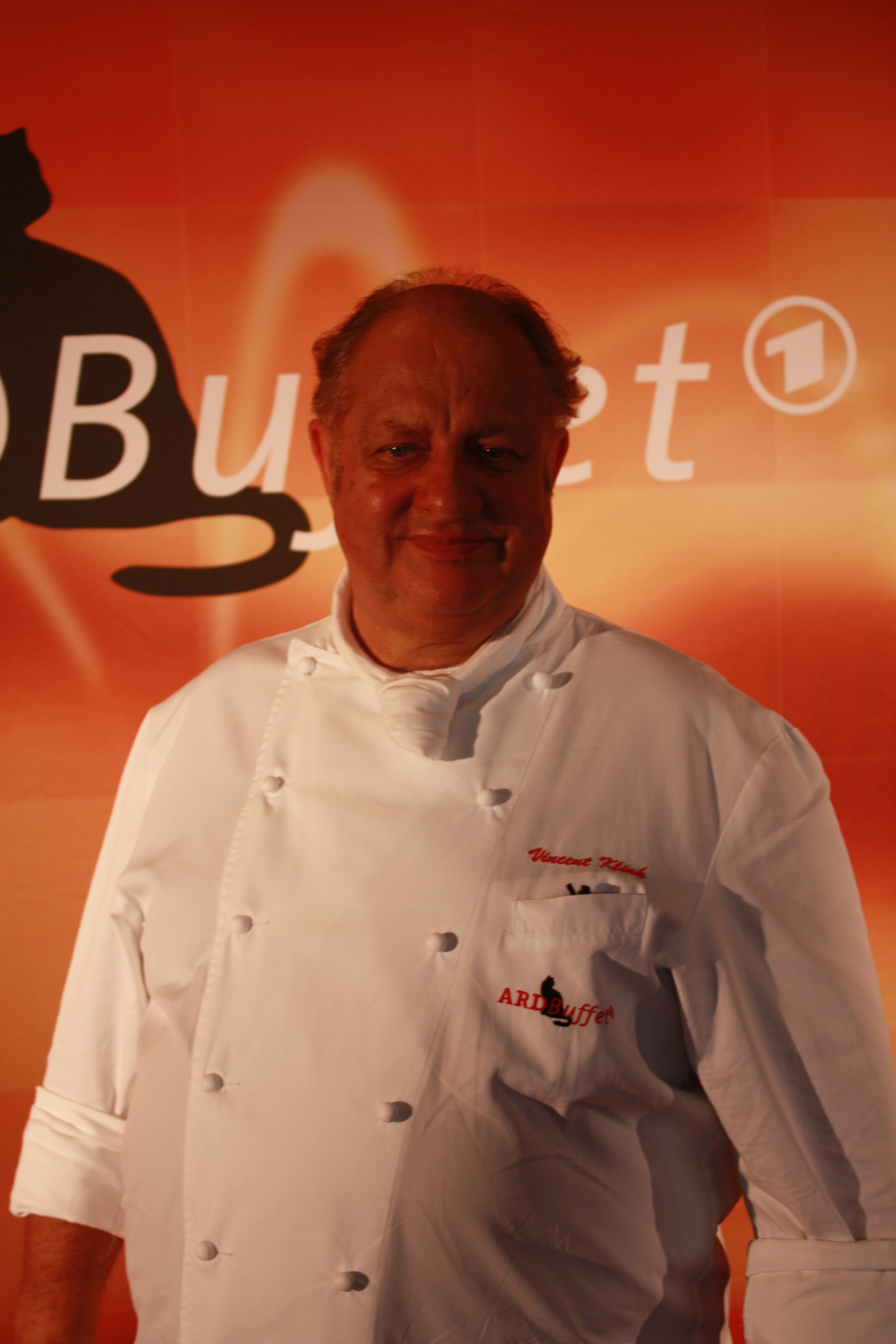
- Klink in 2012
- Born: 29 January 1949 (age 77); Gießen, Germany
- Citizenship: German
- Occupations: Jazz musician and author
- Organization(s): Restaurant Wielandshöhe, Stuttgart
- Known for: food-focused TV-shows and books, Jazz concerts and albums
- Television: ARD-Buffet (German TV-show)

Vincent Klink (born 29 January 1949 in Gießen) is a German chef, restaurateur, author and publisher of culinary literature, jazz musician and media personality known for his food-focused television shows. In 2014, Klink received the Order of Merit of Baden-Württemberg. Klink was founder member of the Deutsche Akademie für Kulinaristik, which takes care of the scientific exploration of the culinary art and customs. Supporting quality food, Klink participated in the Internet-initiative against genetically modified food.

== Celebrity chef and restaurateur ==
After receiving his master craftsman diploma in 1974, Klink and his wife Elisabeth opened their first restaurant, the Postillon in Schwäbisch Gmünd. By 1978, Klink had received his first Michelin star. Klink stated in an interview that he is mainly driven by the pleasure of entertaining and the gathering of cultural knowledge about good food, rather than commercial reasons.

Since 1991, Klink has run the restaurant Wielandshöhe in Stuttgart-Degerloch. Every year since 1998, with the exception of 2001, Klink's cuisine has been awarded with the Michelin star. In spite of this distinction and the related celebrity, Klink puts emphasis on creating a relaxed atmosphere aimed at his guests' well-being. Klink exclusively cooks with vegetables sourced from organic farms and meat from species-appropriate animal husbandry, giving preference to food from the region. Increasingly he blends haute cuisine with typical regional cuisine.

Since 1997 he has become known by a larger audience through his TV shows ARD-Buffet and Koch-Kunst. He had his first film appearance, playing a cook in the comedy thriller C(r)ook. He also had a guest feature in the German police series Tatort, "Alibi für Amelie".

== Author and publisher ==
In addition to his culinary art, Klink cultivates his appreciation of literature. The name Wielandshöhe is a reference to the German poet and writer Christoph Martin Wieland. Klink has published a series of books, either as author, co-author, contributor or as editor. The central theme of his writing is the culinary art, either as cookbooks or interwoven into stories or short stories. In 2009, Klink published his autobiography, Sitting Küchenbull. Der Spiegel comments that Klink "writes juicily and elegantly just as he does his star-awarded cuisine". Over the years, Klink has also published a series of magazines. Examples are Die Rübe. Magazin für kulinarische Literatur (with Stephan Opitz) Cotta's Kulinarischer Almanach, Häuptling Eigener Herd (with Wiglaf Droste), journal culinaire (with Barbara Häusler and Thomas Vilgis, and since 2007 with Martin Wurzer-Berger and Thomas Vilgis).

== Jazz musician ==
Klink started his musical activities as a hobby, playing the German flute. His activities became gradually more professional starting in October 2005, when he had a joint appearance with German Jazz trumpeter Till Brönner. After the end of 2008, he changed to base-flugelhorn and trumpet. In 2008 he had a live appearance on German television with mezzo-soprano Helene Schneiderman featuring the music of Rossini on the island of Mainau. By 2009 Klink's activities as a jazz musician intensified. Since then, he has been active in a cooperation with his friend, the jazz pianist Patrick Bebelaar including concerts dotted with literature readings featuring Klink's books as well as an album production, also produced in collaboration with Bebelaar. They participated in festivals like the Cologne-based lit.COLOGNE or the Baden-Württembergische Literaturtage. Their joint production Stupor Mundi (dml-records in 2015. Vincent Klink, Patrick Bebelaar, Michel Godard, Gavino Murgia and Carlo Rizzo were awarded the German Record Critics' Award, an annual German prize presented for achievement in recorded music.

== Books (selection) ==
- Al dente. Edition q im Quintessenz Verlag, 1999, ISBN 3-86124-354-7 (in cooperation with Norbert Salenbauch and Volker Kriegel)
- Koch-Kunst mit Vincent Klink. Braun-Verlag, Karlsruhe 1998, ISBN 3-765-08194-9
- Meine mediterrane Küche. Gräfe und Unzer, München 2010, ISBN 978-3-8338-1922-3.
- Sitting Küchenbull. Gepfefferte Erinnerungen eines Kochs. Rowohlt Verlag, Reinbek 2009, ISBN 978-3-498-03546-4
- Vom Markt auf den Tisch. Braun-Verlag, Karlsruhe 2000, ISBN 3-765-08248-1
- Weihnachten. DuMont Literatur und Kunst Verlag, Köln 2007, ISBN 978-3-8321-8037-9 (in cooperation with Wiglaf Droste and Nikolaus Heidelbach)
- Wild. DuMont Buchverlag, Köln 2010, ISBN 978-3-8321-9605-9 (in cooperation with Wiglaf Droste and Nikolaus Heidelbach)
- Wir schnallen den Gürtel weiter. Eine Essenz aus "Häuptling Eigener Herd". Reclam-Verlag, Ditzingen 2010, ISBN 978-3-15-020158-9 (in cooperation with Wiglaf Droste and F. K. Waechter)
- Wurst. DuMont Literatur und Kunst, Köln 2006, ISBN 978-3-8321-7992-2 (in cooperation with Wiglaf Droste and Nikolaus Heidelbach),
- Gängster Kochbuch (ed). Edition Vincent Klink, Stuttgart 2004, ISBN 3-927350-75-3 (in cooperation with Pepe Danquart)
