= Dick Benson =

Dick Benson may refer to:

- Dick Benson (ice hockey), played for Pittsburgh Shamrocks
- Dick Benson, a fictional character in S.O.B. (film)

== See also ==
- Richard Benson (disambiguation)
