= Buon Vecchio Charlie =

- Origin: Rome
- Genres: Progressive rock
- Years active: 1970–1972
- Labels: Melos, Akarma Records
- Spinoffs: Bauhaus, Libra

Buon Vecchio Charlie (lit. "Good Old Charlie") was an Italian progressive rock band from Rome, Italy formed in 1970.

== History ==
The initial five-man lineup of the band included, Luigi Calabrò on vocals and guitar, Sandro Centofanti on keyboards, Walter Bernardi on bass, Rino Sangiorgio on drums, and Carlo Visca playing percussion. Subsequently the band saw the entrance of the singer and guitarist Richard Benson, of the bassist Paolo Damiani and the flutist and saxophonist Sandro Cesaroni, with consequent release of Bernardi and Visca. In 1971 the group recorded what would be its first and last album: the homonymous Buon Vecchio Charlie. The disc was recorded for the small Venetian record label, Suono, but was not released. Buon Vecchio Charlie remained forgotten for almost twenty years until, 1990, when the Japanese record company Melos, interested in their first studio work, decided to release their self-titled album on CD. Later, in 1999, Akarma Records reissued the same album on both LP and CD (with the addition of two new tracks).

== After disbandment ==
After this failure, the group broke up in 1972 and almost all members continued their careers: Richard Benson as a television presenter, record producer and with the publication of three albums and several solo singles; Alessandro Centofanti also played in the fusion group Libra and collaborating as a pianist and keyboard player, rarely as a percussionist, with Italian singers such as Luca Barbarossa, Francesco De Gregori, Renato Zero, Giuni Russo, Nada, Riccardo Cocciante, Lucio Dalla, Rino Gaetano, Mia Martini, Antonello Venditti, Roberto Vecchioni, Mario Castelnuovo and Claudio Baglioni. The rest of the musicians, namely Luigi Calabrò, Rino Sangiorgio and Paolo Damiani, formed the experimental band Bauhaus in 1974. The lineup with Luigi Calabrò on guitar, Claudio Giusti on sax, Rino Sangiorgio on drums, Paolo Damiani on bass and Alberto Festa on keyboard won first prize at the music festival of Villa Pamphili in 1974, and in the same year recorded their only studio album Stairway to Escher, which was released in 2003.

== Lineup ==
=== Last Lineup ===
- Richard Benson – Vocals and Rhythm guitar
- Luigi Calabrò – Guitar
- Alessandro Centofanti – Keyboards
- Paolo Damiani – Bass
- Sandro Cesaroni – Saxophone and Flute
- Rino Sangiorgio – Drums

=== Prior members ===
- Walter Bernardi – Bass
- Carlo Visca – Percussion

== Discography ==
Title	Album details
Buon Vecchio Charlie	Released: 1990; Label: Melos Records
