= Vikash Maharaj =

Indian sarod player (born 1957)

- Vikash Maharaj

Background information
- Born: 1 July 1957 (age 69)
- Origin: Varanasi, India
- Genres: Indian classical music, jazz
- Occupation: Musician
- Instrument: Sarod
- Labels: Hammer Musik, Panchnaad
- Website: www.maharajtrio.com

Pandit Vikash Maharaj (born 1 July 1957) is an Indian sarod player.

== Early life and background ==
Maharaj was born in Varanasi in 1957. He was instructed on the sarod by Rajesh Chandra Moitra of the school of Indian classical Maihar gharana. His formal schooling was complemented by lessons from his family, including his uncle Kishan Maharaj.

== Music ==
Maharaj performs Indian classical music, jazz and a crossover between the two. He tours and participates in international crossover festivals, such as the WOMAD, the Diwali festival in New Zealand and the International Leprosy Eradication Festival. During his tours in California, Maharaj was accompanied by his son and tabla player Prabhash Maharaj.

Maharaj has performed with musicians such as Prabhash Maharaj, Abhishek Maharaj, Joshua Geisler, Tom Bailey, and the German a cappella group Wise Guys. Initiated by German music journalist and author Joachim-Ernst Berendt, Maharaj participated in the crossover jazz record "Raga" in 1996. The work was composed by Patrick Bebelaar, and featured musicians Patrick Bebelaar, Frank Kroll, Prabhash Maharaj and Subhash Maharaj. In a second collaboration with Bebelaar Maharaj and his son contributed to the crossover album "Point of View", a composition commissioned by the Internationale Bachakademie Stuttgart which premiered in Stuttgart in 2001. He was awarded the Certificate of Honour (D.I.G. Germany) in 2016, and the Yash Bharti Award by the Uttar Pradesh Government in 2014

== Discography ==
- Music Ensemble of Benaras (LP) (1983)
- Music Ensemble of Benaras (CD) (1984)
- 10 Years of Music Ensemble of Benaras (CD) (1989)
- Raga (CD) (1996)
- Best of Open Jazz Festival Stuttgart (DVD) (1998)
- Pandit Vikash Maharaj (DVD) (2009)
- Sapna (CD) (2001)
- Point Of View (CD) (2003)
- Vikash Maharaj (CD) (2006)
- Path (CD) (2009)
- Yaaraa (CD) (2010)
- Holiwater (CD) (2012)
- Maya(CD) (2014)
- Celebration (CD) (2015)
- Maharaj Trio (2018)
