= Peter Fraize =

American jazz musician

Peter Fraize is a saxophonist and George Washington University professor best known for his freestyle jazz and for performing as a part of the Peter Fraize Quintet.

== Biography ==
Raised in northern Virginia, Fraize attended the New England Conservatory of Music in Boston where he studied classical saxophone. He later studied at the Royal Conservatory of The Hague under Dutch saxophonist Leo van Oostrom. While there Fraize worked with Scapes, a quintet which won first prize at the 1989 Middelzee Jazz Concours.

On returning to the United States in 1989, Fraize formed the fusion group Stickman, which performed at the Mellon Jazz Festival in Pittsburgh. He is a member of the Greg Hatza Organization and is also in a rock group, The Emptys. His jazz group, The Peter Fraize Quartet, won the 1999 Wammie award (Washington Area Music Association) for Contemporary Jazz Ensembles.

Fraize is the director of jazz studies at George Washington University.

== Discography ==
=== As leader or co-leader ===
- Chord Lines/In the Groove (Union, 2018)
- Facts + Figures (Union, 2016)
- Organic Matter (Union, 2009)
- Third Attention (Union, 1998)
- You St.: Live at State of the Union (Union, 1996)
- Stickman (independent release, 1995)

With Gilbert Engle

- Supernatural Absence (New Jazz Media, 2003)
- Jazz Fusion 1 thru 5 (New Jazz, 2015)
- Jazz Fusion 1 thru 3 (New Jazz, 2015)
- Jazz Reggae Fusion (New Jazz, 2016)
- Odd Time Signature Fusion (New Jazz, 2016)
- Petite Jazz Fusion (New Jazz, 2016)
- Magnum Opus Jazz Fusion (New Jazz, 2016)

With The Emptys

- Bridge Across the Ocean (Safari, 1994)
- Pick Your Ears Up (Safari, 1995)
- Loveversesnothing (Safari, 2002)

=== As sideman or guest ===
With Larry Brown

- Hard Bop Cafe (Lush Life, 2006)
- The Long Goodbye (Lush Life, 2002)

With Greg Hatza

- To a New Place (I Ching, 2001)

With Vaughn Nark

- Panorama (Summit, 2004)
- Somethin' Special (Summit, 2000)

With Giancarlo Schiaffini

- Deconstruction! (Pentaflowers (Italy), 2000)
- Post – Deconstruction (Cadence Jazz, 2002)

With Mark Stanley

- Live at Blues Alley (Sir Eel, 2006)
- Humans (Sir Eel, 2003)

With others

- The Fisher Prince (Billion Dollar Films, 2006)
- King James and the Serfs of Swing, Introducing... (Josephsson, 2004)
- Jose Bowen, A Jazz Shabbat Service (Cross Over Music, 2003)
- Origem, Ijexa (Union, 1999)
- Radio Mosaic, Look Around (Little Guy, 1999)
- Ritmo Junction, Suburban Descarga (CSR, 1998)
- Dan Reynolds, To Be Sure (Never Alone Music, 1998)
- Sharón Clark, Finally (Union, 1997)
- River, Songs for the Harbinger (Grantham Dispatch, 1997)
- Red Letter Day, Four Bowls of Colour (Antwinnie Music, 1996)
- Music for Film and Television (Omnicast Music, 1996)
- June Rich, Rain (Hard Time, 1996)
- Primal Virtue (TOG Recordings, 1993)
- Fusion Hackers (Dungeon Music, 1992)
