= Roberto Ottaviano =

Roberto Ottaviano (Bari, 21 December 1957) is an Italian jazz saxophonist.

== Discography ==
- Arrigo Cappelletti/Roberto Ottaviano Quartet, Samashi (Splasc(h), 1986)
- Daniele Cavallanti Double Trio, The Leo (Red Record, 1987)
- Mingus: Portraits in six Colours (Splasc(h), 1988)
- Items from the Old Earth (Splasc(h), 1990)
- Above Us (Splasc(h), 1990)
- Hybrid and Hot (Splasc(h), 1995)
- Black Spirits Are Here Again with Mal Waldron (DIW, 1996)
- Live in Israel (2002)
