= Richard Benson (musician) =

British-Italian guitarist and singer (1955–2022)

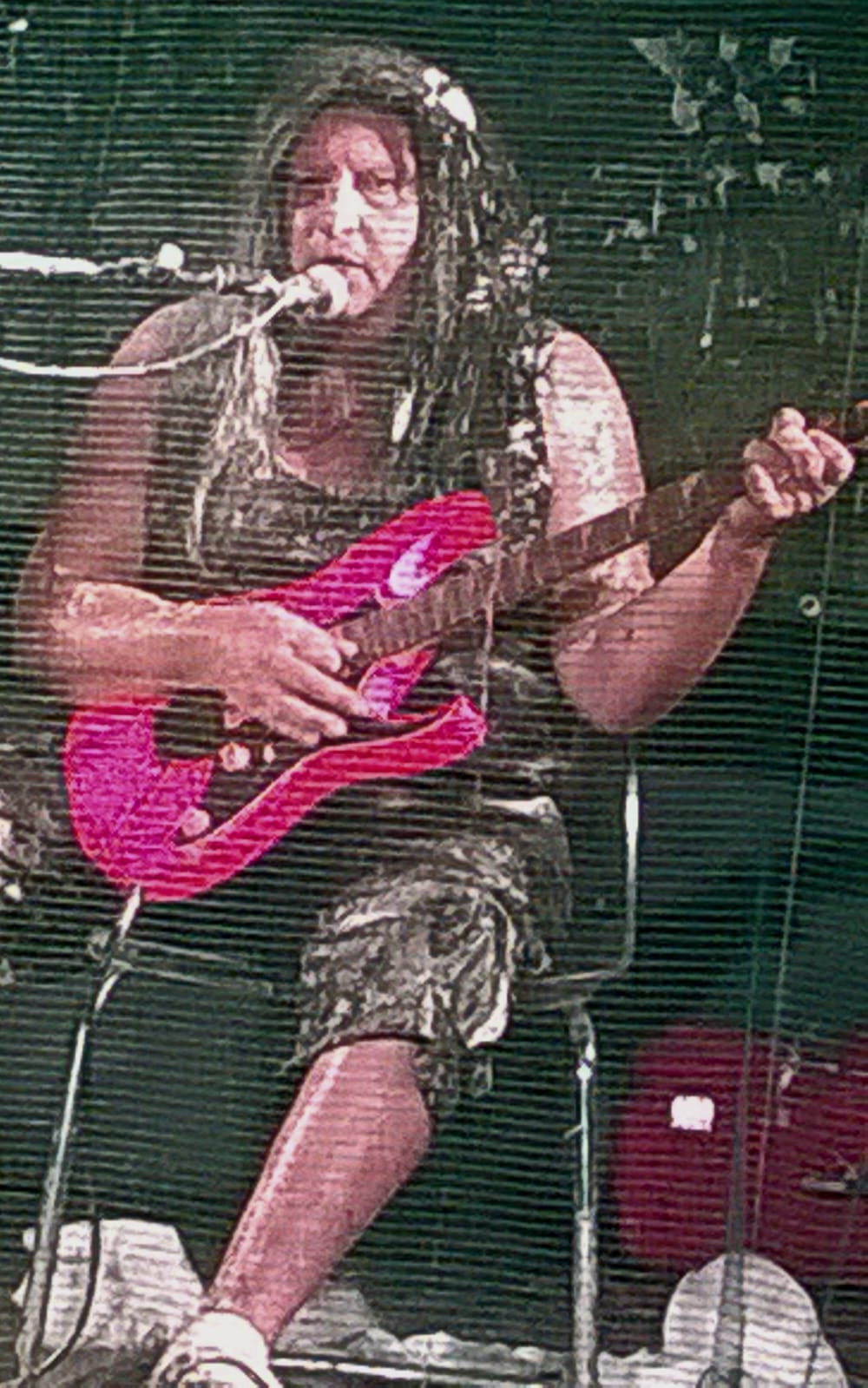
- Benson in 2014 during a show in Ciampino, Italy

Background information
- Born: Richard Philip Henry John Benson; 10 March 1955; Woking, Surrey, England
- Died: 10 May 2022 (aged 67) Rome, Italy
- Genres: Progressive rock; hard rock; heavy metal; blues rock; pop
- Occupations: Guitarist; singer-songwriter; actor; television personality
- Instruments: Vocals; guitar
- Years active: 1970-2022
- Labels: Playgame Music; INRI
- Formerly of: Buon Vecchio Charlie
- Spouses: Maria Antonietta Capacci; Carolyn Monroe; Ester Esposito (m. 2013)

Richard Philip Henry John Benson (10 March 1955 – 10 May 2022) was an English-Italian guitarist, singer-songwriter, and television personality.

== Life ==
Benson was born in Woking, England, to a Belgian mother and a British father, both of whom had Italian origins. His paternal great-grandfather was Samuel Herbert Benson, the founder of the first advertising company in the UK. His grandfather, one of Sir Samuel Herbert Benson's sons, married an Italian model. Benson moved with his family to Italy in 1965, where he had been an active musician since his early teens.

In 2000, Benson suffered a serious leg injury when he fell off the Ponte Sisto bridge in Rome. While he claimed that the accident was the result of an assault, there are suspicions that Benson actually attempted suicide, since he had been diagnosed with arthritis shortly before, which is suggested to have greatly impacted his guitar playing and skills. Benson had to undergo prolonged rehabilitation to be able to walk again.

In November 2016, Benson and his wife, Ester Esposito, appeared in a video on repubblica.it where they revealed financial problems and asked for donations to cover medical expenses. Benson can be seen stooped and hardly able to walk due to arthritis. It was also revealed that he suffered from heart problems and had already undergone surgery at that point.

Benson died in Rome on 10 May 2022, at the age of 67.

== Musical career ==
In 1971, Benson recorded with the progressive rock band Buon Vecchio Charlie a self-titled LP, which was only released in 1990 when the original record company brought out some of their early productions on CD. The album features Benson on vocals and 12-string guitar.

In 1972, he took part in the festival Villa Pamphili.

In 1983, he released his first single, "Animal Zoo", an Italo disco production. In the following year he released his second single, "Renegade", a song (along with the B-side "Flash Back") with electro-rock tones.

In 1984, he wrote and recorded music for the cult movie The Incinerator (Italian: L'inceneritore) in which he also appeared in a small role as a street gang member.

In 1987, he produced the compilation album Metal Attack (RCA Italy – Talent), where he sings on the track "Exotic Escape" that he also co-wrote.

In 1999, he released a solo album called Madre Tortura, which featured progressive hard-rock tracks. In 2015, he released L'inferno dei vivi on the label INRI, a rock-opera-style concept album with electronic elements, and the accompanying single "I Nani".

In 2016, Benson released Duello madre, a digital compilation of tracks from earlier releases.

In September 2019, Benson published several videos on YouTube in which he performs unpublished blues and pop songs on the classical guitar. The music is his work, while the lyrics are written by Cinzia Colibazzi.

== TV and movies ==
During the 1970s and 1980s, Benson hosted various programs about contemporary alternative music on TV and radio. In 1992 he played himself as a TV host in Carlo Verdone's successful film Damned the Day I Met You.

In the 1990s and 2000s, Benson often appeared as a guest on RAI, the prime Italian channel, usually judging musicians. His appearances were often over the top and satirical in nature.

== Discography ==
=== Albums ===
- 1999: Madre Tortura
- 2015: L'inferno dei vivi – a rock-opera produced by Federico Zampaglione
- 2016: Duello madre (compilation/digital downloading)
- 2024: 24 back to 84

=== Singles ===
- 1983: "Animal Zoo"
- 1984: "Renegade"
- 2022: "Processione"

=== Albums with others ===
- 1990: Buon Vecchio Charlie by Buon Vecchio Charlie (recorded in 1971)

=== Live bootlegs ===
- 2003: Bootleg Infernale
- 2004: Il Natale del Male
