= Umberto Petrin =

Italian jazz pianist, composer and poet (born 1960)

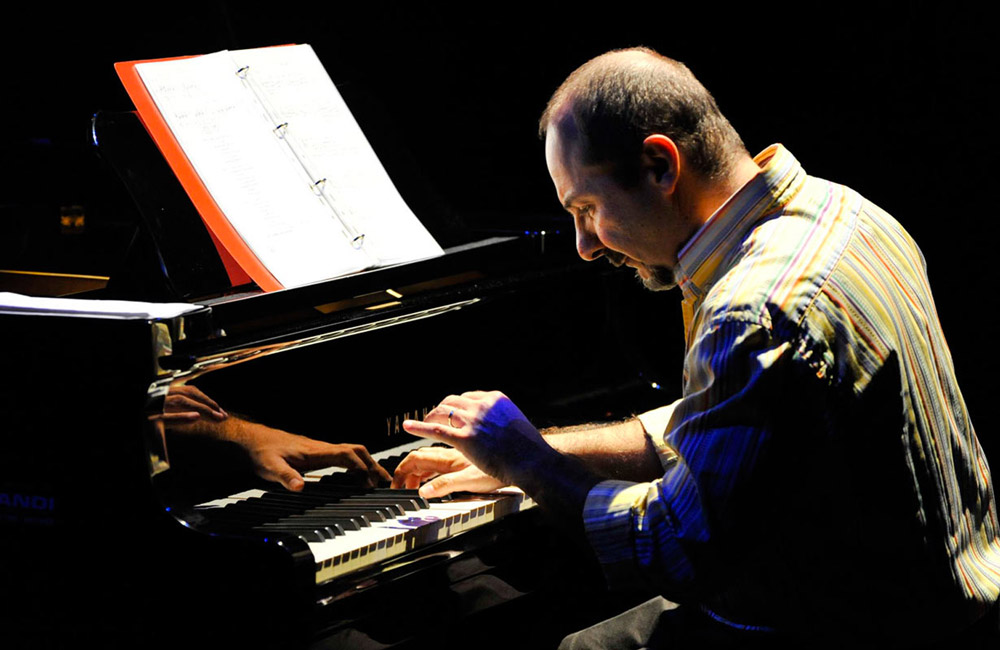
Umberto Petrin Live

Umberto Petrin (born 1960) is an Italian jazz pianist, composer and poet. He devoted himself to the study of the piano at the age of 12. After studying Chemistry, he graduated in Piano at the Giuseppe Verdi Conservatory in Milan, where he is now Professor of Jazz Piano. From the age of 18 he took an active interest in contemporary poetry and began a long collaboration with literary magazines, winning several prizes and being a finalist in numerous poetry competitions.

== Life and career ==
In 1984 he began his jazz career with his own trio. Starting from 1986 he intensified his musical activity, forming a quartet and occasionally performed with the Big Band of the RAI in Milan. In 1989 he is called into the group of Tiziana Ghiglioni and forms a duo with the trumpeter Guido Mazzon. He tackles free jazz and works on a fusion project between improvised music and poetry through the collaboration with one of the greatest Italian sound poets: Luigi Pasotelli. He attends the most current musical styles and performs alongside leaders such as: Steve Lacy, Lee Konitz, Anthony Braxton, Lester Bowie, Barry Altschul, Enrico Rava, Tim Berne, Paul Lovens, Paul Rutherford, Han Bennik, Willem Breuker, Marc Ducret, Michael Moore, with many of whom he also makes record publications. His records attain critical success and he is considered among the best ten Italian musicians in the various editions of the referendum of the Top Jazz specialized critics.

Umberto Petrin
- Born: 1960 (age 65–66)
- Genres: Jazz
- Occupations: Musician, composer, poet
- Instrument: Piano
- Years active: 1980s–present
- Website: umbertopetrin.it

He joined the Italian Instabile Orchestra in 1997., with which he remained until 2009, participating in major international festivals and touring all over the world. He records only one CD on music by Thelonious Monk, with the endorsement of the poet Amiri Baraka (LeRoi Jones). Since 1999 he has collaborated with Stefano Benni, one of the most famous Italian writers and since 2001 he has performed alongside the actor Giuseppe Cederna, Also in 1999 he deals with reinterpretations of traditional folk music themes, which he will continue over the years until he meets the music of Rio Grande do Sul (Brazil) together with the Brazilian accordionist Renato Borghetti (2002).

Since 2000 he has been playing in a duo with the saxophonist and composer Gianluigi Trovesi. In 2000 he meets Cecil Taylor as part of a collaboration with the Instabile Orchestra. The American pianist expresses great esteem for him and gives him some original pieces. During this meeting a duo of pianos emerged which the international press described as "an event" and which is reported on the CD "The Owner of the River Bank" (ENJA, 2004). Considered one of the major interpreters of Thelonious Monk's music, together with the writer and poet Stefano Benni, he constructs a recital on the figure of the great pianist titled Misterioso. The recital is performed in the main Italian theaters and international jazz festivals, so much so as to suggest a recording on DVD.

Since 2001 he has collaborated with the Fondazione Cineteca in Milan for the live soundtracking of some restored silent films. In 2003 he released "Particles" in which he played both original compositions and by Cecil Taylor and inevitable themes by Monk, including the voice / piano version of Misterioso (reciting voice by Stefano Benni).

In 2004 he made a concert / performance for piano-electronics and video, Beuys Voice, together with Lucrezia De Domizio (historian and follower of Beuysian thought) on the latest precious video by the German artist Joseph Beuys. The performance had already been repeated about 20 times in European Festivals and Museums (at the 52nd Biennale of Contemporary Art in Venice, at the Greek Amphitheater in Sparta, Spain, at the Auditorium in Girona, at the Kunsthaus in Zurich, at the Spectrum in New York, at the theaters of Pisa, Naples, Grosseto, Bologna, Pescara, Verbania…).

Umberto Petrin has performed in major international festivals throughout Europe, in the U.S.A., in Canada, in Japan. He records a CD with Gianluigi Trovesi for the ECM label.

Successful replicas of the homage to Monk with Stefano Benni continue and in 2005 the DVD published by the Feltrinelli publisher is released and the recital is also requested in France, Germany, England. At the same time he collaborates with the actors Giuseppe Cedena, Lella Costa, Maurizio Crozza, Neri Marcorè, Ugo Dighero, David Riondino and with the writer Paolo Nori.

In January 2006 he was the creator of a conference on "Pensiero della Musica" at the "Luogo della Natura" wanted by Lucrezia De Domizio Durini and Harald Szeemann in Bolognano, near Pescara. The conference is attended by philosophers, artists, scientific researchers, writers. He performs in concert and records, for the Soul Note label (2007), with a new duo together with the French trumpeter Jean-Luc Cappozzo.

He made various tours in Switzerland, Germany, Spain and in 2009, at the Berlin Film Festival, he played with Trovesi at the Berliner Philarmoniker Auditorium.

In 2010 he played in a duo with the American guitarist Garrison Fewell. He realizes a new challenging project together with Stefano Benni, creating and performing the music for The Waste Land by T.S. Eliot, published on CD-audiobook (with Benni as narrator). It was then brought to the theater.

In 2011 Beuys Voice also becomes a book and a CD, published by Mondadori Electa and officially presented at the Kunsthaus in Zurich, with the vocal support of soprano Susie Helena Georgiadis. Also In 2011, he publishes in solo A dawn will come for the English label Leo Records (which obtained considerable critical success, rated with ★★★★ -Excellent- from the French Jazz Magazine, from the Belgian Free Jazz, from AllAbout Jazz, from Italian Alias and from Switzerland JazzNMore. It is among the 20 best albums of the year in the USA Culture Catch survey - the only album by an Italian musician present in the chart). The Clusone Festival invites him for a special duo project with drummer Pheeroan AkLaff. The concert was a great success.

He publishes for the English label Leo Records a new album in Piano Solo, Traces and Ghosts, which obtains the Disco CHOC award for the Jazz Magazine-Jazzman magazine, the most authoritative in France and gives the pianist an invitation to perform in Piano Solo at the 2014 Lisbon Jazz Festival, as well as two solo concerts at the Spectrum in New York.

The particular adaptability of Petrin's music, able to interact with various arts and disciplines, is also noticed in the scientific field and in the same year he is invited by the INFN, National Institute of Nuclear Physics, in collaboration with CERN, to hold concerts in various locations of the Science Festival, up to playing in the Gran Sasso Physics Laboratory in 2020.

In 2019 he was invited by Christina Pluhar as a guest of the international ensemble L’Arpeggiata, with which he participated in several international tours. He releases, for the NAU Records label, a new trio album with Paolino Dalla Porta (double bass) and Patrice Heral (percussion, electronics), which will be released in 2020 under the title Plastikwind.

He goes on a tour with the writer Stefano Benni for the presentation of the latest book. His music is included as the soundtrack of the film on the writer's life, published on DVD for the Feltrinelli edition (2019).

He performs in a duo with the saxophonist Tino Tracanna and, in a new project, also with the clarinetist Marco Colonna.

In 2020 he formed The Lunatics group together with Tino Tracanna (sax), Roberto Cecchetto (guitar) and Francesco D'Auria (percussion).

Umberto Petrin has recorded over 70 CDs, many of which have been critically awarded. He has inspired several characters in Stefano Benni's novels, including Antaeus Petrini in the novel Di tutti le ricchezze and the jazz pianist Stan in Dancing Paradiso. The poem Frammenti d’ombre e penombre by the poet Giovanni Fontana is dedicated to him. Everybody Dance The Music of Chic, artistic cover by Marco Lodola, is his latest record produced in 2021, a jazz reworking of the music of Chic, the American group founded by bassist Bernard Edwards and guitarist Nile Rodgers, the latter creator of the new sound in the disco-funk music, differentiating itself from all stereotypes. Umberto Petrin, who does not renounce to apply his personal vision to this work as well, has chosen to derive the name of the new album from one of the most famous hits of the band, the homonymous song "Everybody Dance" of 1977, to which he connects an important part of his youth.

== Discography ==
An asterisk (*) indicates the year of release.

=== As leader/co-leader ===
Year recorded	Title	Label	Personnel/Notes
1999*	Ellissi	Splasc(h)	Some tracks trio, with Giovanni Maier (bass), Roberto Dani (drums); some tracks quartet, with Tim Berne (alto sax) added
2001*	Voir Loin	Splasc(h)	With Assif Tsahar (tenor sax, bass clarinet), Giovanni Maier (bass), Roberto Dani (drums, percussion), Milo De Angelis (vocals)
2001	Reuniao	Splasc(h)	With Renato Borghetti (gaita ponto), Pedrinho Figueiredo (flute, soprano sax), Daniel Sa (guitar), Susie Georgiadis (vocals)
2003	Particles	Splasc(h)	Solo piano
2007*	Law Years	Soul Note	Duo, with Jean Luc Capozzo (trumpet)
2010–11	A Dawn Will Come	Leo	Solo piano
2014*	Traces and Ghosts	Leo	Solo piano

=== As sideman ===
Year recorded	Leader	Title	Label
1992	Tiziana Ghiglioni	Something Old, Something New, Something Borrowed, Something Blue	Splasc(h)
2005	Gianluigi Trovesi	Vaghissimo Ritratto	ECM
