= Mark Stanley (musician) =

Musician based in Maryland, USA

Mark Stanley is an American musician, songwriter, and record producer based in Maryland, USA. A multi-instrumentalist, composer and producer, his primary instrument is guitar, on which he touches a wide range of styles.

Stanley’s first recording was "Disconcerto" by Chainsaw Jazz (1993). He has performed live with 9353, Chainsaw Jazz, Clutch, Kristeen Young, Spookey Ruben, and Troy Van Leeuwen (Queens of the Stone Age, Perfect Circle, Failure). Stanley was a founding member of the band Handsome (band) with Peter Mengede (Helmet). He is the songwriter, vocalist and guitarist for the band Spy Machines (Jean Paul Gaster, Mike Dillon, and Hank Upton) and co-fronts the band Farquhar with Mark Smoot. He has recorded under the pseudonyms Johnny Foodstamps, Pig Manikin, and Levitating Pam.

== Education ==
Stanley studied at Berklee College of Music before graduating from NYU with a degree in Jazz Studies. His private teachers include Wayne Krantz, Hal Galper, Bruce Arnold, Charlie Banacos and Paul Bollenback.

== Family ==
Mark Stanley is the 1st cousin once removed of Owsley Stanley, the great grandson of Augustus Owsley Stanley, great great-grandson of Pierce Crosby, and Otto Hilgard Tittmann and is the great great-grandnephew of William Owsley.

== Discography ==
Stanley has released forty recordings as a bandleader:

- "Pig Street" (1994)
- "Look, Honey" (1996)
- "Weird Horizon" (1998)
- "Living Machine" (2000)
- "Insect Warriors" (2002) featuring Dennis Chambers, Mark Egan and Sean Rickman
- "Blueberry Submarines" (2002)
- "Humans" (2004)
- "9 Volt" (2004)
- "Gift Ideas For The Universe" (2005)
- "Taste The Magic" (2006)
- "Oceanic Fields" (2013) Pig Manikin
- "Dark Brain" (2014) featuring Oz Noy, Jean-Paul Gaster (Clutch), Peter Fraize and Scott Ambush (Spyro Gyra)
- "NYANDERTHAL" (2016)
- "Double Dreaming" (2018) Mark Stanley with Carla Diratz
- "WHAT?" (2020)
- "Speed Limits of Iceland" (2021)
- "This Idiot's Dream" (2021)
- "Trash Lawyer" (2021)
- "Senior Recital NYU - 1994" (2024)
- "Live at the Izzy Bar" (2024) with Spirit Gang
- "Live at the Tattoo" (2024) with Spirit Gang
- "Live at Blues Alley" (2024) with Sean Rickman, Peter Fraize and Scott Ambush (Spyro Gyra)
- "Hey Pazuzu" (2024)
- "Slow Poker" (2024) EP
- "Scare Margo" (2024)
- "Grope" (2024) EP
- "Land of the Snake Women" (2024) EP
- "Illuminati Six String" (2024)
- "The Red Viper Collection" (2024) Compilation
- "Zombies at the Mall" (2024) Compilation
- "Vast Reality Volume 1" (2024) Compilation
- "Vast Reality Volume 2" (2024) Compilation
- "Balloon Theory" (2024) Compilation
- "The Cosmic Dawn" (2024) Pig Manikin
- "Dogma Preacher" (2025)
- "Vast Reality Volume 3" (2025)
- "Black Stanley" (2025)
- "Drifting Trees" (2025)
- "Sir Jazzius Dorkus" (2025)
- "Attitude Suppressant" (2025)

=== Farquhar ===
His band Farquhar has made three records distributed by Cuneiform Records

- "Farquhar" (1999)
- "Meadow Full Of Serpents" (2005)
- "Dreamshit" (2012)

=== Love and Rockets ===
- "Lift" (1998) Lift (Love and Rockets album)

=== Spookey Ruben ===
- "Bed and Breakfast" (2001) Bed and Breakfast (album)

=== Clutch ===
- "Pitchfork" (1991) Pitchfork (album)

=== Spy Machines ===
- "Spy Machines" (2020)
