= Georg Ruby =

German jazz pianist and composer

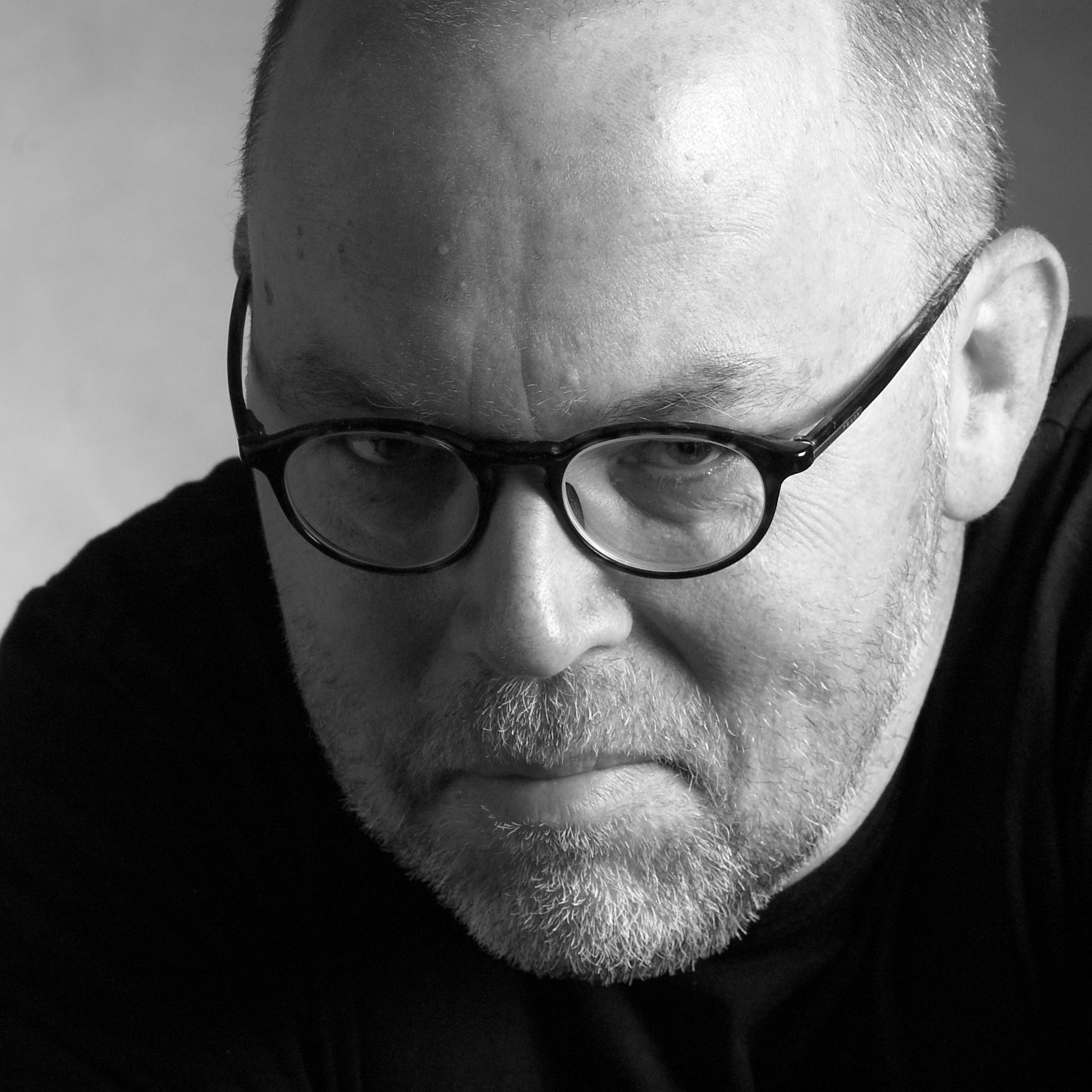
- Ruby in 2010

Background information
- Born: 16 December 1953 (age 72); Diez, Germany
- Genres: Jazz
- Occupations: Pianist, composer, arranger
- Label: JazzHausMusik

Georg Ruby (born 16 December 1953) is a German jazz pianist, composer and arranger. He is also the founder of the record label JazzHausMusik.

Ruby has recorded several albums with Michel Pilz. The New York City Jazz Record ranked their Deuxième Bureau "The Album of the Year 2011".

== Discography (selection) ==
- Potosi/Dioko (1985)
- Strange Loops (1993)
- Village Zone, Mackeben Revisit (2006)
- Ruby Domesticus Vulgaris (2006)
- Personal Songbook (2008)
- Deconstruction Service (2009)
- Village Zone (2019)
