= Giancarlo Schiaffini =

Italian jazz trombonist and tubist

Giancarlo Schiaffini is an Italian jazz trombonist and tubist most associated with avant-garde music, free improvisation and free jazz. A member of the Italian Instabile Orchestra, Schiaffini has worked with such artists as Mario Schiano, Lol Coxhill, Andrea Centazzo and also Thurston Moore of Sonic Youth. Also, he has collaborated with the Gruppo di Improvvisazione di Nuova Consonanza.

== Discography ==
=== As leader ===
- About Monk. Pentaflowers. 1992. w/ Gianluigi Trovesi, Daniele Cavallanti, Eugenio Colombo, Pasquale Innarella, Rudy Migliardi, Tiziano Tononi
- As a Bird. Pentaflowers. 1994. w/ Sandro Satta & Alberto Mandarini
- The Missing Chainring (L'Aneillo Mancante). Print. 1997.
- L' Anello Mancante (The Missing Chainring). Imprint Records. 2000.
- Free Jazz at the Philharmonic. Splasc(h). 2002. w/ Mario Schiano & Bruno Tommaso
- Rhapsody for Billie. Imprint Records. 2002. w/ Silvia Schiavoni
- My Favorite Standards. Imprint Records. 2004. w/ Giovanni Maier & Michele Rabbia
- Tuba Libre. Random Acoustics.

=== As sideman ===
- Mario Schiano (1973). On the Waiting List. Atavistic.
- Lol Coxhill (1978). Moot. Ictus.
- Trovesi Damiani Quintet (1983). Roccellanea. Splasc(h).
- Dino Betti Van Der Noot (1986). They Cannot Know. Soul Note.
- Tiziana Ghiglioni (1987). Well, Actually. Splasc(h).
- Eugenio Colombo (1988). Sorgente Sonora. Jazz Network.
- Riccardo Fassi (1989). Il Principe. Splasc(h).
- Italian Instabile Orchestra (1991). Live In Noci And Rive-De Gier. Leo.
- Nexus Octet (1991). Preacher & The Ghost. Splasc(h).
- Mario Schiano; Famoudou Don Moye; Marcello Melis; Giancarlo Schiaffini (1991). Uncaged. Splasc(h).
- Mario Schiano (1992). Original Sins: Unreleased, 1967-1970. Splasc(h).
- Trovesi, Gianluigi; Giancarlo Schiaffini; Fulvio Maras (1992). Let. Splasc(h).
- Tiziana Ghiglioni (1992). S O N B. Splasc(h).
- Claudio Cojaniz Trio; Giancarlo Schiaffini (1994). Alea. Splasc(h).
- Italian Instabile Orchestra (1997). European Concerts '94-'97. Nel Jazz.
- SIC Trio (1994). Passemmezzo. Splasc(h).
- Italian Instabile Orchestra (1994). Skies of Europe. ECM.
- Daniel Studer (1996). Details.
- Umberto Petrin (1996). Wirrwarr. Splasc(h).
- Mario Schiano; Giancarlo Schiaffini; Bruno Tommaso (1998). (To Be Continued...). Discoteca di Stato.
- Eugenio Colombo (1999). Guida Blu. Splasc(h).
- Italian Instabile Orchestra (2000). Litania Sibilante. Enja.
- Centazzo, Andrea; Lol Coxhill; Franz Koglmann (2000). Situations. Robi Droli/Newtone.
- Thurston Moore (2001). Three Incredible Ideas. Auditorium.
- Peter Fraize; Giancarlo Schiaffini (2002). Post-Deconstruction. Cadence Jazz.
- Italian Instabile Orchestra (2002). Previsioni del Tempo: Forecast. Imprint.
- Nexus (2002). Seize the Time!. Splasc(h).
- Daniel Studer (2004). Ianus. STV/ASM.
- Italian Instabile Orchestra; Cecil Taylor (2004). The Owner of the Riverbank. Enja/Justin Time.
- Daniele Cavallanti (2005). Our Prayer. Splasc(h).
