= Giorgio Gaslini =

Italian jazz musician

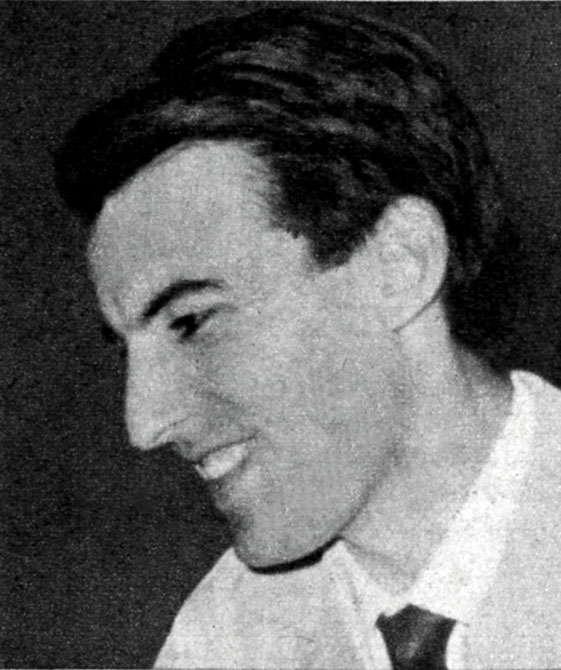
- Giorgio Gaslini in 1957

Background information
- Born: 22 October 1929; Milan, Italy
- Died: 29 July 2014 (aged 84) Borgo Val di Taro, Parma, Italy
- Genres: Jazz
- Occupations: Musician, composer, conductor
- Instrument: Piano
- Website: giorgiogaslini.it

Giorgio Gaslini (Italian pronunciation: [ˈdʒordʒo ɡaˈzliːni]; 22 October 1929 – 29 July 2014) was an Italian jazz pianist, composer and conductor.

He began performing aged 13 and recorded with his jazz trio at 16. In the 1950s and 1960s, Gaslini performed with his own quartet. He was the first Italian musician mentioned as a "new talent" in the Down Beat poll and the first Italian officially invited to a jazz festival in the USA (New Orleans 1976–77). He collaborated with leading American soloists, such as Anthony Braxton, Steve Lacy, Don Cherry, Roswell Rudd, Max Roach, but also with the Argentinian Gato Barbieri and Frenchman Jean-Luc Ponty. He also adapted the compositions of Albert Ayler and Sun Ra for solo piano, which the Soul Note label issued. He also composed the soundtrack of Michelangelo Antonioni's La notte (The Night, 1961).

From 1991 to 1995, Gaslini composed works for Carlo Actis Dato's Italian Instabile Orchestra, and was the first holder of jazz courses at the Santa Cecilia Academy of Music in Rome (1972–73). As to contemporary music, he composed symphonic works, operas and ballets represented at the Scala Theatre in Milan and other Italian theatres, in addition to film scores, including Bali (1970), Your Hands on My Body (1970), Cross Current (1971), The Hassled Hooker (1972), The Night of the Devils (1972), So Sweet, So Dead (1972), When Women Were Called Virgins (1972), Five Women for the Killer (1974) and Kleinhoff Hotel (1977). In 1975, he was contacted by Dario Argento to score Deep Red, having previously scored Argento's The Five Days in 1973. Argento was disappointed by the music, and only three of Gaslini's original themes were retained.

Gaslini died at 84 in Borgo Val di Taro, in the province of Parma, where he had been living for years together with his longtime wife and 14 dogs and cats.

== Discography ==
=== As leader ===
Recording date	Title	Label	Year released	Notes
1966-02	Nuovi Sentimenti	La Voce Del Padrone	1966	With Don Cherry and Enrico Rava (trumpet), Steve Lacy (soprano sax), Gianni Bedori (alto sax, flute), Gato Barbieri (tenor sax), Kent Carter and Jean-François Jenny-Clark (bass), Aldo Romano and Franco Tonani (drums)
1967?	New Sound Jazz #2	Cinevox	1967	
1968-04, 1968-06	Il fiume Furore	I dischi del sole	1968	
1968?	Grido	Durium	1968	In concert
1969?	Un quarto di vita	Durium	1969	with I Nuovi Angeli and Edmonda Aldini
1969?	Newport in Milan	Produttori Associati	1969	with big band
1970?	Africa ! Mikrokosmos	Produttori Associati	1970	
1972?	Una cosa nuova	Produttori Associati	1972	
1973-03	Message	BASF	1973	
1973?	Favola Pop Reportage Da "L'Isola Di Utopia"	Produttori Associati	1973	
1973-10, 1973-12	Fabbrica occupata	Produttori Associati	1974	Co-led with Jean-Luc Ponty
1973-11 – 1974-07	Colloquio con Malcolm X	PDU	1974	
1976?	Canti di popolo in jazz	PDU	1976	Co-led with Bruno Tommaso
1976?	Jean-Luc Ponty meets Giorgio Gaslini	Produttori Associati	1976	
1976-01	Murales live	Dischi della Quercia	1976	In concert
1976-04	New Orleans Suite	Dischi Della Quercia	1976	Quartet, with Gianni Bedori (tenor sax, soprano sax), Julius Farmer (electric bass), John Vidacovich (drums)
1977-06	Free Actions	Dischi Della Quercia	1977	Sextet, with Gianni Bedori (tenor sax, soprano sax), Gianluigi Trovesi (alto sax, soprano sax, bass clarinet), Paolo Damiani (bass), Gianni Cazzola (drums), Luis Agudo (percussion); in concert
1977-11	Graffiti	Dischi Della Quercia	1978	[2LP] Sextet, with Gianni Bedori (tenor sax, soprano sax), Gianluigi Trovesi (alto sax, soprano sax, bass clarinet), Paolo Damiani (bass), Gianni Cazzola (drums), Luis Agudo (percussion); in concert
1981-05	Gaslini Plays Monk	Soul Note	1981	Solo piano
1984-07	Schumann Reflections	Soul Note	1984	Trio, with Piero Leveratto (bass), Paolo Pellegatti (drums)
1987-10	Multipli	Soul Note	1988	With Roberto Ottaviano (alto sax, soprano sax, sopranino sax, bass clarinet), Claudio Fasoli (tenor sax, soprano sax), Bruno Tommaso (bass), Giampiero Prina (drums)
1990-07	Ayler's Wings	Soul Note	1991	Solo piano
1990-03, 1990-09, 1991-03, 1991-06	Masks	Soul Note / Musica Jazz	1992	With orchestra
1994-01	Lampi	Soul Note	1994	With Daniele Di Gregorio (vibes, marimba, percussion), Roberto Bonati (bass), Giampiero Prina (drums)
1996-02	Jelly's Back In Town	Dischi Della Quercia	1996	With orchestra
1996-07	Mister O	Soul Note	1997	With orchestra
1995-05, 1997-06	Ballets	Soul Note	1998	With strings
2000-06	Sacred Concert. Jazz Te Deum	Soul Note	2002	In concert with orchestra
2000-09, 2001-03, 2001-04	Enigma	Soul Note	2001	Partially in concert (2000–09). With Proxima Centauri Orchestra.
2002-05	Il Brutto Anatroccolo	Il Manifesto	2005	with Orchestra Jazz della Sardegna
2002-06	Urban Griot	Soul Note	2003	With Proxima Centauri Orchestra; In concert
2003-09	Plays Sun Ra	Soul Note	2005	Solo piano
2003-11	Elle	Velut Luna	2004	
2006?	Musica Totale	Azzurra	2006	
2007-01	Jazzitaliano Live 2007	Casa Del Jazz	2007	Trio, with Roberto Bonati (bass), Roberto Dani (drums, percussion); in concert
2007-05	Ellaura	Velut Luna	2007	With Laura Conti
2011-05	Piano Solo: Incanti	Cam Jazz	2011	Solo piano; in concert

Compilations

- L'Integrale, Anthologia Cronologica No. 1, No. 2 (Soul Note) – rec. 1948–1964
- L'Integrale, Anthologia Cronologica No. 3, No. 4 (Soul Note) – rec. 1964–1968
- L'Integrale, Anthologia Cronologica No. 5, No. 6 (Soul Note) – rec. 1968–1969
- L'Integrale, Anthologia Cronologica No. 7, No. 8 (Soul Note) – rec. 1973–1974
- Giorgio Gaslini: Sinfonico³ (Velut Luna, 2010) – classical rec. 1992, 1997, 1999, 2008, 2009
- Gaslini sinfonico 4 (Velut Luna, 2014) – classical rec. 1999, 2011, 2013

Main sources:

=== As sideman ===
With Mario Schiano

- Jazz a confronto 8 (Horo, 1974)

== Selected filmography ==
- La notte (1961)
- Le sorelle (1969)
- Le tue mani sul mio corpo (1970)
- La pacifista (1970)
- Incontro d'amore a Bali (1970)
- Un omicidio perfetto a termine di legge (1971)
- Quando le donne si chiamavano madonne (1972)
- Il vero e il falso (film)|Il vero e il falso (1972)
- La notte dei diavoli (1972)
- Rivelazioni di un maniaco sessuale al capo della squadra mobile (1972)
- Le cinque giornate (1973)
- Profondo rosso (1975) (with Goblin)
