= Tiziano Tononi =

Italian percussionist and composer (born 1956)

Tiziano Tononi (born November 18, 1956, Milan) is an Italian percussionist and composer.

== Biography ==
Tononi taught himself to play drums in a pop/rock idiom as a youth, then turned to playing jazz and classical percussion in his late teens, studying with Andrew Cyrille and Bob Moses. Playing locally in Milan in the early 1980s, he joined the Democratic Orchestra Milano and co-founded the Nexus ensemble with Daniele Cavallanti, as well as the group Moon on the Water toward the middle of the decade. Through the 1980s he played in a variety of idioms with musicians such as Pierre Favre, Tiziana Ghiglioni, Maggie Nicols, Barre Phillips, Dewey Redman, Giancarlo Schiaffini, and Gianluigi Trovesi.

In the 1990s Tononi played with the Jazz Chromatic Ensemble and the Italian Instabile Orchestra, as well as in a trio with Beppe Caruso. His Multiphonics Tuba Trio, with Renato Geremia and Michel Godard, was founded in 1997; he also did composition and arrangement work, including the soundtrack to Ketchup and tributes to Don Cherry and Roland Kirk.
