= Paolo Damiani =

Italian jazz musician (born 1952)

- Born: 1952 (age 73–74); Rome, Italy
- Genres: Avant-garde jazz
- Occupations: Musician, composer
- Instruments: Cello, double bass
- Labels: Splasch

Paolo Damiani (born 1952) is an Italian jazz cellist and double-bassist. He was a member of the avant-garde jazz band Italian Instabile Orchestra. He has worked with Gianluigi Trovesi, Kenny Wheeler, Tony Oxley, Paolo Fresu, and John Taylor. He has also played on albums by Deep Forest and the Italian jazz-rock band Bauhaus. He was the bassist of progressive rock band Buon Vecchio Charlie, who released one album in 1971.

== Discography ==
=== As leader ===
- Unisoni (Clac, 1989)
- Eso with Paolo Fresu, Gianluigi Trovesi, Danilo Rea, Roberto Gatto, Raffaela Siniscalchi, Antonio Iasevoli, Sabina Macculi (Splasc(H), 1994)
- IS Ensemble (Via Veneto Jazz, 1996)
- Sconcerto with Stefano Benni (Il Manifesto, 1999)
- Mediana with Carlo Mariani, Michele Rabbia, Sandro Satta, Carlo Rizzo (EGEA, 1999)
- Charmediterraneen with Orchestre National De Jazz, Anouar Brahem, Gianluigi Trovesi (ECM, 2002)
- Provvisorio with Alea Ensemble (Splasc(H), 2004)
- Ladybird (EGEA, 2004)
- Jazzitaliano Live 2007 (Casa Del Jazz, 2007)
- Al tempo che farà (EGEA, 2007)
- Pane e tempesta (EGEA, 2010)
- Classiche musiche leggere (Casa Del Jazz, 2016)

=== As sideman ===
With Italian Instabile Orchestra

- 1991 Live in Noci and Rive-De Gier (Leo)
- 1994 Skies of Europe (ECM)
- 1997 European Concerts '94–'97 (Nel Jazz)
- 2000 Litania Sibilante (Enja)
- 2004 The Owner of the Riverbank (Enja)

With Gianluigi Trovesi

- 1983 Roccellanea (Splasc(h))
- 1985 Dances (Red)

With others

- 1972 Buon Vecchio Charlie, Buon Vecchio Charlie
- 1974 Stairway to Escher, Bauhuas
- 1984 Live at Roccella Jonica, Norma Winstone, Kenny Wheeler, Paolo Fresu, John Taylor, Tony Oxley (Splasc(h))
- 1990 Giada, Eugenio Colombo (Splasc(h))
- 1999 Made in Japan, Deep Forest (Sony)
- 2002 Italian Jazz Graffiti, Civica Jazz Band (Soul Note)
