= Eugenio Colombo =

Italian saxophonist and flautist

Eugenio Colombo (born 10 December 1953 in Rome, Italy) is an Italian saxophonist and flautist most associated with avant-garde jazz. A founding member of the Italian Instabile Orchestra, Colombo has worked with such musicians as Mario Schiano, Giorgio Gaslini, Steve Lacy, Bruno Tommaso, Maurizio Giammarco, Giancarlo Schiaffini and the band Area.

== Discography ==
- Giada. Splasc(h). 1990.
- Guida Blu. Splasc(h). 1999.
- Tales of Love and Death. Leo Records. 2000.

=== As contributor ===
- Mario Schiano (1973). Sud. Splasc(h).
- Italian Instabile Orchestra (1991). Live In Noci And Rive-De Gier. Leo Records.
- Silvana Licursi (1993). Far from the Land of Eagles: Music of Albanians in Exile. Lyrichord.
- The Giuseppe Guarrella Project (1994). Live! Festival Ibleo del Jazz. CMC.
- Italian Instabile Orchestra (1994). Skies of Europe. ECM.
- SIC Trio (1994). Passemmezzo. Spasc(h).
- Giorgio Occhipinti; Hereo Nonetto (1995). The Kaos Legend. Leo Records.
- Italian Instabile Orchestra (1997). European Concerts '94-'97. Nel Jazz.
- Ekkehard Jost (1998). Some Other Tapes. Fish Records.
- Italian Instabile Orchestra (2000). Litania Sibilante. Enja Records.
- Piero Milesi (2000). Within Himself. Cuniform.
- Area (2002). Maledetti. Import.
- Italian Instabile Orchestra (2002). Previsioni del Tempo: Forecast. Imprint Records.
- Italian Instabile Orchestra; Cecil Taylor (2004). The Owner of the Riverbank. Enja Justin Time.
