= Carlo Actis Dato =

Italian jazz saxophonist and composer

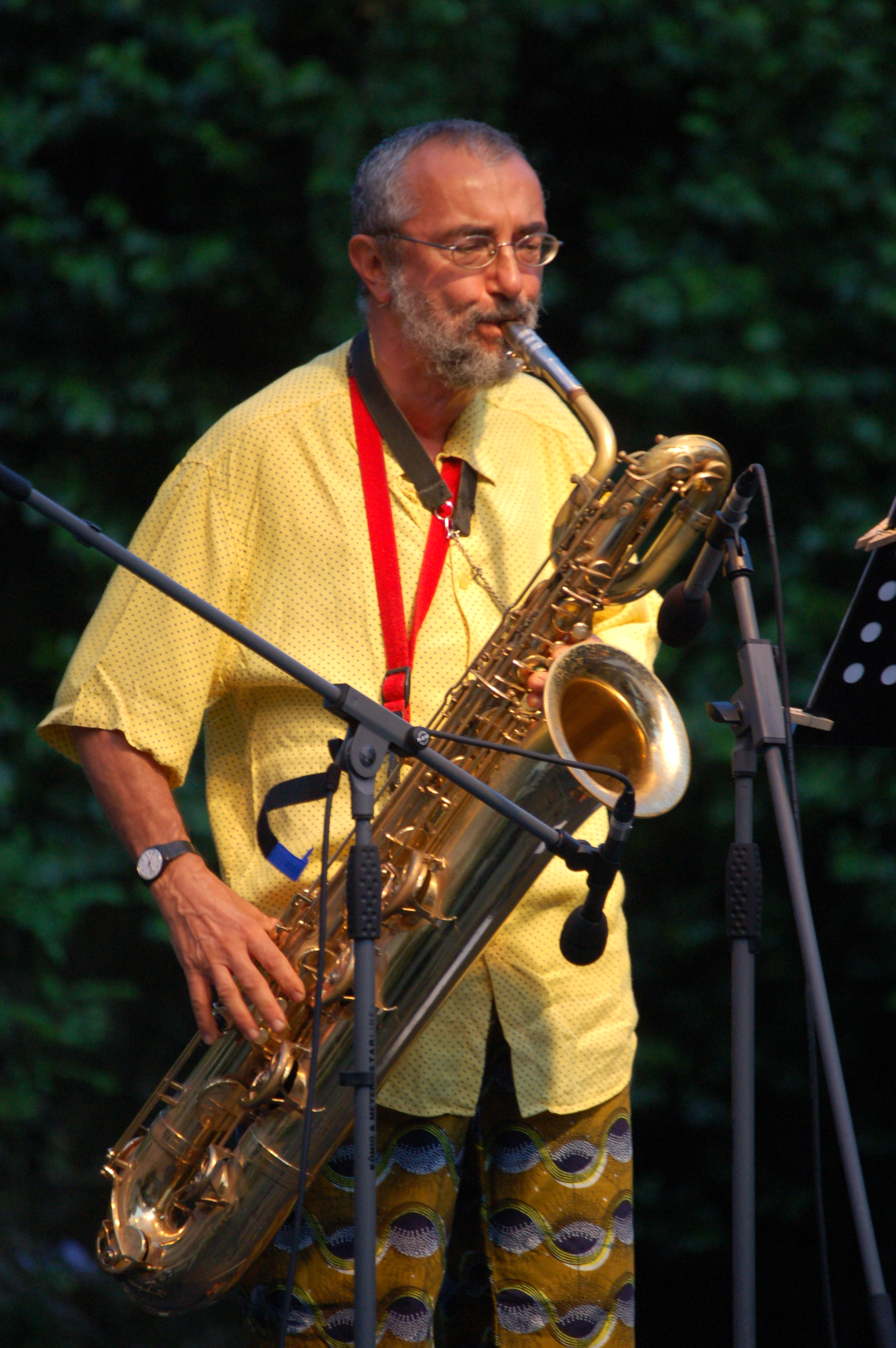
- Dato in 2008

Background information
- Born: 21 March 1952 (age 74); Turin, Piedmont, Italy
- Genre: Jazz
- Occupations: Musician; composer
- Instrument: Baritone saxophone
- Years active: 1980s–present
- Labels: Splasc(h); YVP; DeeDee; CAD; LeoR

Carlo Actis Dato (born 21 March 1952 in Turin) is an Italian jazz saxophonist and composer. His Actis quartet toured worldwide in the 1990s.

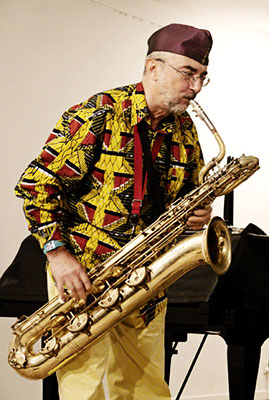
Dato in 2015

== Discography ==
=== As leader ===
==== Carlo Actis Dato quartet ====
- Noblesse Oblige (Splasc(h), 1986)
- Oltremare (Splasc(h), 1987)
- Ankara twist (Splasc(h), 1989)
- Badge Boogie (Splasc(h), 1992)
- Blue Cairo (Splasc(h), 1995)
- Ginosa Jungle (Splasc(h), 1998)
- Delhi Mambo (YVP [Germany], 1998)
- Fes Montuno (YVP [Germany], 2000)
- Istanbul Rap (YVP [Germany], 2002)
- Swingin Hanoi (Splasc(h), 2003)
- Dolce Vita-Musique Vivante (DeeDee, 2006)
- World Tour (CAD, 2009)
- 2010 (CAD, 2010)
- Sin Fronteras (LeoR, 2012)

==== Actis band ====
- Son para el Che (Splasc(h), 1997)
- Don Quijote (Splasc(h), 2001)
- Garibaldi (Leo, 2002)
- On tour (Splasc(h), 2004)
- Allende (Leo, 2005)
- Cina! (Leo, 2007)

==== Solo ====
- Urartu (LeoR, 1994)
- The Moonwalker (LeoR, 2000)

==== Atipico Trio ====
- Where the Reeds Dare (splasc(h), 1990)
- Gone with the Winds (Splasch(h), 1996)
- Allegro con brio (LeoR, 2004)
- Eqqueqquà! (LeoR, 2010)

==== Actis Furioso ====
- Avanti popolo! (Splasc(h), 2005)
- World People (LeoR, 2008)

==== ActisDato / Rocco DUO ====
- Paso Doble (Splasc(h), 1997) – with guitarist Enzo Rocco
- Paella & Norimaki (Splasc(h), 2000)
- Domestic Rehearsal (CD Baby, 2011)

==== Martinez / Actis Dato DUO ====
- Folklore Imaginario (LeoR, 2004) – with double-bassist Baldo Martinez
- Sounds from the Earth (Universal, 2010)

=== As member ===
- E(x)stinzione Orchestra, Live (Splasc(h), 2012)
- Dune (Splasc(h), 1991) – with Laura Culver, Alex Rolle and Massimo Barbiero
- Kazutoki Umezu, Wake up with the birds (LeoR, 1998) – duo
- Masahiko Satoh, Liberissimo (Baj, 1999) – duo
- Y. Tachibana & K. Ohta, Tomorrow Night Gig (LeoR, 2001) – TAO

=== As sideman ===
- Art Studio, The Complete C.M.C. Sessions (Splasc(h), 1978–85)
- Art Studio & Tiziana Ghiglioni
- Andrea Centazzo Mitteleuropa Orchestra, Doctor Faustus (1984) – with Enrico Rava, Carlos Zingaro, Albert Mangelsdorff, Theo Jörgensmann, Gianluigi Trovesi and Franco Feruglio
- Max Carletti Jazz Trio, "Intro for C.A.D. / Tomcat Blues" (1989) – baritone saxophone feature on one track
- G. Gaslini Big Band, Mister O (Soul Note,1996)
- Serial Killer, Live in Porto (NoMusic, 2002)
- Italian Instabile Orchestra, Skies of Europe (ECM, 1994); The Owner of the river bank, w. Cecyl Taylor (Enja, 2000); Creative Orchestra, with Anthony Braxton (RAITrade, 2007); Totally Gone (RAItrade, 2009)
- Enrico Fazio, Euphoria! (CMC, 1989); Gracias! (CMC, 1996); Zapping (LeoR, 2003)
- Pino Minafra, Sudori (Victo, 1995); Terronia (Enja, 2004)
- Roy Paci, Corleone (Etna gigante, 2004)
- Giorgo Occhipinti Tentet, Global Music (Jazz'halo, 2000)
