= Mario Schiano =

Italian saxophonist (1933–2008)

Mario Schiano (Italian pronunciation: [ˈmaːrjo ˈskjaːno]; 20 July 1933 in Naples – 10 May 2008 in Rome) was an Italian alto and soprano saxophonist associated with avant-garde/free jazz.

A member of the Italian Instabile Orchestra, Schiano recorded with musicians such as Famoudou Don Moye, Eugenio Colombo, Ernst Reijseger, Paul Rutherford, Gianluigi Trovesi and Joëlle Léandre, among others. He is also remembered for one of his few film appearances, playing the role of a disillusioned university teacher in The Best of Youth (2003).

Schiano died following a 5-year-long illness at the age of 74.

== Discography ==
- Sud (Tomorrow, 1973)
- On the Waiting List (King Universal, 1974) – rec. 1973
- Jazz a confronto 8 (Horo, 1974)
- De Dé (1977)
- Out of Date (1984)
- Redland Blue (1988)
- Benefit Concert to Repurchase the Pendulum for Mr. Foucault (1989)
- Unlike (1990)
- Uncaged with Don Moye (1991)
- And So On with Ernst Reijseger (1992)
- Original Sins: Unreleased, 1967–1970 (1992)
- Tracks (1993)
- Blue Memories with Joëlle Léandre
- Meetings (1994)
- She Was Sitting in the First Row (1994)
- Used to Be Friends (1995)
- Social Security (Live, 1996)
- Friendship of Walnuts (1996)
- (To Be Continued...) (1998)
- Trio di Napoli (1998)
- Fluxus: Instant Soundtrack for a Silent Movie (1999)
- My Funny Valentine (1999, Vocals)
- Supposing That (2002)
- Mario Schiano & His All Stars (2007)

=== As contributor ===
- Italian Instabile Orchestra (1991). Live in Noci and Rive-De Gier. Leo.
- Italian Instabile Orchestra (1994). Skies of Europe. ECM.
- Italian Instabile Orchestra (1997). European Concerts '94-'97. Nel Jazz.
- Trio Di Napoli (1998). Trio Di Napoli. Discoteca Di Stato. w/ Elio Martusciello and Maurizio Martuscielo
- Mario Schiano; Giancarlo Schiaffini; Bruno Tommaso; Sebi Tramontana (2002). Free Jazz at the Philharmonic. Splasc(h).
- Italian Instabile Orchestra (2002). Previsioni del Tempo: Forecast. Imprint.
- Italian Instabile Orchestra; Cecil Taylor (2004). The Owner of the Riverbank. Enja/Justin Time.
