= Gianluigi Trovesi =

Italian jazz musician

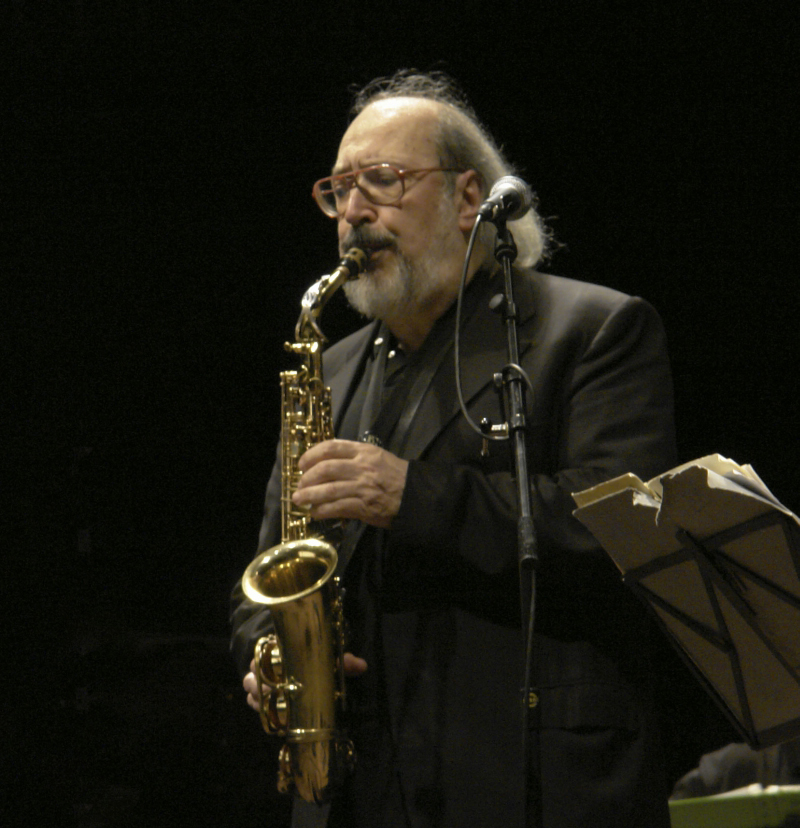
- Gianluigi Trovesi in 2006

Background information
- Born: Giovanni Luigi Trovesi; 1944 (age 81–82); Nembro, Italy
- Genres: Jazz, avant-garde jazz, classical
- Occupations: Musician, educator
- Instruments: Saxophone, clarinet
- Years active: 1970s–present
- Labels: Leo, ECM, Soul Note
- Website: www.gianluigitrovesi.com

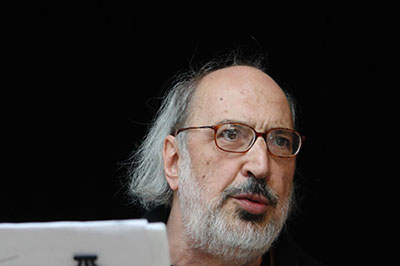
Trovesi in Aarhus, Denmark Photo Hreinn Gudlaugson

Gianluigi Trovesi (born 1944) is an Italian jazz saxophonist, clarinetist, and composer. He has won various Italian jazz awards. He also teaches in Italy.

== Early life ==
Trovesi was born in Nembro near Bergamo in Lombardy in 1944. He studied harmony and counterpoint under Vittorio Fellegara.

== Later life and career ==
In 1978 Trovesi won the "RAI TV National Competition for Saxophone and Clarinet" in 1978, and the Critics' National Prize for his debut album, Baghet. He won Best Italian Disc for the albums Dances (1985), From G to G (1992) and Les Hommes Armés (1996).

Trovesi has toured, recorded and performed with Anthony Braxton, Misha Mengelberg, Horace Tapscott, Steve Lacy, Evan Parker, Kenny Wheeler, Mark Dresser, Han Bennink, Tony Oxley and Günter Sommer.

Trovesi is a member of the Italian Instabile Orchestra and performs in a duo with accordionist Gianni Coscia. He teaches in Italy.

== Discography ==
=== As leader ===
- Baghet. Dischi Della Quercia. 1978.
- Cinque Piccole Storie. Dischi Della Quercia. 1981.
- Dances. Red. 1985.
- Les Boîtes à Musique. Splasc(h). 1988.
- From G to G. Soul Note. 1992.
- Let. Splasc(h). 1992.
- Colline. Silex. 1994.
- Radici. EGEA. 1995. w/ Gianni Coscia
- Les Hommes Armés. Soul Note. 1997.
- Around Small Fairy Tales. Soul Note. 1999.
- In Cerca Di Cibo. ECM. 2000. w/ Gianni Coscia
- Round About a Midsummer's Dream. Enja. 2000.
- Big Band Project. Enja. 2002.
- Fugace. ECM. 2002.
- Round About Weill. ECM. 2005. w/ Gianni Coscia
- Vaghissimo Ritratto. ECM. 2007.
- Profumo di Violetta. ECM. 2008.
- Frère Jacques: Round About Offenbach. ECM. 2011. w/ Gianni Coscia
- Anat Fort Trio: Birdwatching. ECM. 2016. w/ Anat Fort

=== As contributor ===
- Marc Charig & The Wuppertal Workshop Ensemble (1981). The Family. FMP.
- Trovesi Damiani Quintet; Paolo Damiani; Gianluigi Trovesi (1983). Roccellanea. Splasc(h).
- Andrea Centazzo (1984). Shock 11. Ictus.
- Dino Betti Van Der Noot (1985). Here Comes Springtime. Soul Note.
- Paolo Damiani Quintet (1987). Poor Memory: Live in Atina. Splasc(h).
- Dino Betti Van Der Noot (1988). They Cannot Know. Soul Note.
- Mario Schiano; Peter Köwald; Gianluigi Trovesi; Paul Lovens; Pino Minafra; Radu Malfatti (1989). Benefit Concert to Repurchase the Pendulum for Mr. Foucault. Splasc(h).
- Marche jazz orchestra, year =1989 "Dies Irae", Philology
- Italian Instabile Orchestra (1991). Live In Noci And Rive-De Gier. Leo.
- Giorgio Gaslini (1991). Masks. Soul Note/Musica Jazz.
- Nexus Octet (1991). Preacher and the Ghost. Splasc(h).
- Paolo Damiani Ensemble (1991). Song Tong. Splasc(h).
- Tiziana Ghiglioni (1992). S O N B. Splasc(h).
- Paolo Damiani (1993). Eso. Splasc(h).
- Enrico Rava (1994). Electric Five. Soul Note.
- Paolo Fresu Sextet (1994). Ensalada Mistica. Splasc(h).
- Italian Instabile Orchestra (1994). European Concerts '94-'97. Nel Jazz.
- Italian Instabile Orchestra (1994). Skies of Europe. ECM.
- Tiziana Ghiglioni (1994). Tenco Project. Philology.
- Ettore Fioravanti; Gianluigi Trovesi; Ernst Reijseger; Franco D'Andrea (1996). Belcanto. Ram.
- Pietro Tonolo (1996). Disguise. Splasc(h).
- Banda Cittá Ruvo Di Puglia (1997). La Banda. Enja.
- Maarten Altena Ensemble (1997). October Meeting 1991, Anatomy of a Meeting. BIMhuis.
- Tiziano Tononi; Daniele Cavallanti (1997). We Still Have Visions. Splasc(h).
- Maria Pia De Vito (1998). Phoné. EGEA.
- Guido Manusardi (1998). The Village Fair. Soul Note.
- Paolo Fresu (1999). Berchidda: Italian Years. Iris.
- Gianni Coscia (1999). La Bottega. EGEA.
- Enrico Intra (1999). Dissonanza Consonanza. Musica Jazz.
- Ivano Fossati (2000). La Disciplina della Terra. Columbia.
- Italian Instabile Orchestra (2000). Litania Sibilante. Enja.
- Michel Godard (2001). Castel del Monte. Enja.
- Gianni Coscia (2002). L' Archiliuto. EGEA.
- Civica Jazz Band (2002). Italian Jazz Graffiti. Soul Note.
- Andrea Centazzo (2002). Live with the Mitteleuropa Orchestra. Felmay.
- Italian Instabile Orchestra (2002). Previsioni del Tempo: Forecast. Imprint.
- Orchestre National de Jazz (2003). Charmediterranéen. ECM.
- Christina Pluhar (2004). All'Improvviso. Alpha Productions.
- Italian Instabile Orchestra (2004). The Owner of the Riverbank. Enja Justin Time.
- Eso Octet. Eso Octet. Splasc(h).
- Nexus (1994). Free Spirits. Splasc(h).

== Filmography ==
- Il cortile della musica (The Music Court), (2010)
