= Leo Records =

British record company and label

- Founded: 1979
- Founder: Leo Feigin
- Genre: Jazz
- Country of origin: UK
- Location: London, England
- Official website: leorecordsmusic.com

Leo Records is a British record company and label, founded in 1979, which releases jazz from Russian, American and British musicians. It concentrates on free jazz. This label is different from the Leo Records that was formed by Edward Vesala in Helsinki, Finland, in 1978.

== History ==
Leo Records was founded in 1979 by Leo Feigin (also known under his broadcasting name Aleksei Leonidov), a Russian immigrant to Britain. The label was particularly associated with establishing the world reputation of the Ganelin Trio during the 1970s and 1980s.

In its first ten years, releases from Leo included albums by musicians from the Soviet Union such as Sergey Kuryokhin, Sainkho Namtchylak and Valentina Ponomaryova. By the end of 1986, Leo had released more than 20 albums by musicians from Communist countries, including the Soviet Union. In 1987, a DownBeat reviewer commented that Leo had been "the main conduit for the Soviet avant garde's recorded output anywhere, East or West." Leo's promotion of Soviet jazz musicians helped secure concerts for some of them spread over a week at the 1989 Zurich jazz festival; recordings from the concerts were released as Conspiracy: Soviet Jazz Festival, Zurich 1989.

By the mid-1990s, Leo had introduced the Leo Lab series, "as an imprint for emerging and unknown artists". Leo has released more than 50 recordings by saxophonist Ivo Perelman.

By 2019, Feigin had ceased being actively involved in production, instead concentrating on "handling administrative tasks while the musicians themselves record and design artwork." In 2024, he reached an agreement with Phil Freeman, a writer and owner of a record label, to make some of Leo's back catalogue available via Bandcamp.

== Noted artists ==
- Aardvark Jazz Orchestra
- Art Ensemble of Chicago
- Anthony Braxton
- John Wolf Brennan
- Jaki Byard
- Eugenio Colombo
- Marilyn Crispell
- Carlo Actis Dato
- Patrick Defossez
- Joe Fonda
- Satoko Fujii
- Vyacheslav Ganelin/Ganelin Trio
- Katsuyuki Itakura
- Italian Instabile Orchestra
- Sergey Kuryokhin
- Joëlle Léandre
- Keshavan Maslak
- Phil Minton
- Amina Claudine Myers
- Joe Morris
- Don Moye
- Simon Nabatov
- Sainkho Namtchylak
- Mark Nauseef
- Maggie Nicols
- Evan Parker
- Ivo Perelman
- Umberto Petrin
- Valentina Ponomaryova
- Sun Ra
- Ned Rothenberg
- Wadada Leo Smith
- Miroslav Tadić
- Aki Takase
- Cecil Taylor
- Gebhard Ullmann
- Matthew Welch
- Reggie Workman
- Yuri Yukechev
