= Italian Jazz Awards =

The Italian Jazz Awards (acronym IJA) are an independent musical review created in 2006 by Andrea Causi and managed by the ACM (Italian free management Agency) in collaboration with the American Management Agency. The purpose of the IJA is to reward the best Italian jazz musicians, chosen by an Artistic Board and voted on by the audience on the IJA Official Website. The awards are dedicated to the memory of the Italian jazz pianist Luca Flores, who died in 1995.

Andrea Causi created the awards while a student of the Jazz Graduation Course of the Conservatory of music G. F. Ghedini in Cuneo. The first edition of the IJA started in 2007 along the lines of the American Jazz Awards.

The awards consist of four categories with four nominees chosen by an Artistic Board. The Board changes every two years, and is formed of jazz musicians and journalists, tasked with picking four finalists, who then pass to the final phase of the contest: the public polls.

The only one of the awards not voted on by the audience but chosen by the Artistic Board is the Honorary Award, assigned to the most important Italian jazz musician of Europe and the world.

In February 2008, American jazz pianist Uri Caine was the special guest of the IJA'07 red carpet show.

== Winners ==
=== 2007 Genoa ===
- Honorary Award: Luca Flores (posthumous assigned to Flores' sister Barbara)
- Best Jazz Act: Dado Moroni
- Best Jazz Singer: Danila Satragno

=== 2008 - Sanremo/Rome/Milan ===
- Honorary Award: Renato Sellani
- Best Jazz Act: Fabrizio Bosso
- Best Jazz Singer: Larry Franco
- Brand New Jazz Act: Paolo Alderighi
- Best Jazz Album: It's a Good Day - Patti Wicks Trio
- P-Choice Award: Blue Dolls

Artistic Board: Freddy Colt, Maria Grazia Scarzella, Melania Renzi, Samuel J. Morris.

=== 2009 - Alessandria/Bari ===
- Honorary Award: Franco Cerri
- Best Jazz Act: Giovanni Amato
- Best Jazz Singer: Paola Arnesano
- Brand New Jazz Act: Francesco Negro
- Best Jazz Album: "Lifetime" - Daniele Scannapieco

Artistic Board: Tiziana Ghiglioni, Patti Wicks, Freddy Colt, Paolo Longo, Adriana Isoardi, Renzo Coniglio, Massimo Epinot.

=== 2010 - Mola di Bari/Locorotondo/Bernalda ===
- Honorary Award: Jula de Palma
- Best Jazz Act: Mirko Signorile
- Best Jazz Singer: Giuseppe Delre
- Brand New Jazz Act: Attilio Troiano

Artistic Board: Barbara Flores, Guido Di Leone, Freddy Colt, Paolo Longo, Adriana Isoardi, Massimo Epinot.

=== 2011 - Rome/Udine ===
- Honorary Award: Franco D'Andrea
- Best Jazz Act: Mauro Zazzarini
- Best Jazz Singer: Cinzia Spata
- Brand New Jazz Act: Barbara Errico

Artistic Board: Barbara Flores, Guido Di Leone, Eva Simontacchi, Stefano Maurizi, Roberto Chiriaco.
