= Luca Flores =

Italian pianist and composer

Luca Flores (October 20, 1956 - March 29, 1995) was an Italian pianist and composer. He is considered one of the most interesting exponents of the Italian jazz scene.

== Biography ==
Born in Palermo, the youngest of four siblings, he moved with his family to Mozambique in 1959. There he began playing piano at the age of 5. When he returned to Italy in 1966, he spent some time in Rome and then in Portugal, before arriving in Florence in 1972. He studied at the Luigi Cherubini Conservatory where he graduated in piano with honours in 1981. Later on he studied jazz with Roberto Pichini, Marco Vavolo, Enrico Pieranunzi and Franco D'Andrea.

His encounter with jazz took place in the early 1970s: he frequented Florentine clubs such as the Andrea del Sarto, where he met the nascent community of Italian jazz musicians. He made his national debut in the "Tiziana Ghiglioni Sextet" (with Tiziana Ghiglioni, Maurizio Caldura Nuñez, Luca Bonvini, Franco Nesti, Alessandro Fabbri) with which he recorded his first LP, Streams (1984). Together with Gianni Cazzola he formed the "Matt Jazz Quintet" (with Maurizio Caldura Nuñez, Alessandro Di Puccio, Marco Vaggi). With these groups he took part in major Italian festivals. Later he formed the "Luca Flores Trio" (with Lello Pareti and Piero Borri).

He collaborated with artists such as Chet Baker, Massimo Urbani, Bruno Tommaso, Lee Konitz, Sal Nistico, Paolo Fresu, Gianni Basso, Paolo Damiani, Claudio Fasoli, Riccardo Del Fra, Al Cohn, Steve Grossman, Al Grey, Bobby Watson, Bob Mover, Kenny Wheeler, Dave Holland, David Murray, Nicola Stilo, Enrico Rava, Muhal Richard Abrams, Tony Scott, Tullio De Piscopo, Pietro Tonolo, Roberto Gatto, Alfred Kramer, Flavio Boltro, Barbara Casini.

From 1979 to 1987 he taught at the Andrea del Sarto Institute in Florence, resuming his teaching activity in 1993, and participated in workshops in Siena as a piano teacher from 1985 to 1987, where he had numerous pupils; among them the renowned pianist Stefano Bollani.

In October 1987, the mental illness that would accompany him for the rest of his life exploded, leading him to episodes of self-harm, including the injury of a hand and an ear and the consequent loss of hearing from this. His mental discomfort led him to the extreme choice: on 29 March 1995, 10 days after a last recording session in piano solo at Planet Sound Studios in Florence, he committed suicide in his house in Montevarchi.

A biographical film called Piano, Solo, starring Kim Rossi Stuart as Flores and directed by Riccardo Milani, was released in 2007.

== Discography ==
=== As leader ===
- 1986 - Sharp Blues - Matt Jazz Quintet - Splasc(h) Records – LP H 109.1 • 2003 - CD Version H 109.2
- 1986 - Riddles - Bruno Marini - Luca Flores - LMJ 3334; Splasc(h) Records – CD H 0533.2 (2003) Historical Performances (postumo)
- 1987 - Where Extremes Meet - Matt Jazz Quintet & Guests - Splasc(h) Records – LP H 123.1 • 1989 - CD Version H 123.2
- 1990 - Sounds And Shades Of Sound - Luca Flores Trio - Splasc(h) Records – CD H 320.2
- 1993 - Love For Sale - Luca Alex Flores - Splasc(h) Records – CD H 396.2
- 1995 - For Those I Never Knew (piano solo) - Splasc(h) Records (posthumous) – CD H 439.2
- 2003 - Matt Jazz Quintet Live : Trescore Cremasco (1984) & Siena (1985) - Splasc(h) Records – CD HP 517.2/518.2 Historical Performances (posthumous)
- 2005 - Luca Flores suona la musica di Fabio Turchetti (registrato 1985) - Incontronotte Records (posthumous)
- 2007 - Concerto registrato a Firenze, 4/11/1994 - combined with the soundtrack CD of the film Piano, Solo - Sony-BMG (posthumous)
- 2019 - INNOCENCE - Luca Flores: 16 tracce inedite registrate tra Giugno 1994 e Marzo 1995 - AUAND piano series AU3019-20 doppio CD (posthumous)

=== As sideman ===
- 1985 - Streams - Tiziana Ghiglioni sextet - Splasc(h) Records – LP H 104.1 • 1989 - CD Version H 104.2
- 1986 - Barga Jazz Live, Barga Jazz Festival - PIRAS Edizioni Musicali
- 1987 - Easy To Love, Massimo Urbani quartet - Red Records
- 1987 - Dreams - Giko Pavan Group - Splasc(h) Records - LP H 128.1 • 2003 - CD Version H 128.2
- 1987 - A Night At The Sha-li-mar, Chet Baker quartet - PHILOLOGY
- 1987 - Barga Jazz 1987, Live - Barga Jazz Festival - Splasc(h) Records – LP HP 006.1 Historical Performances
- 1988 - Chet Baker's Last Recording as Quartet, Chet Baker quartet - Timeless
- 1989 - Coriandoli - Tiziana Simona e Riccardo Bianchi with Luca Flores, Tino Tracanna, Ettore Fioravanti - Guest: Jean Jacques Avenel - Splasc(h) Records – LP H 167.1
- 1995 - Body And Not Soul, Roberta Pierazzini quartet - SAM jazz
- 1995 - Errata Corrige, Nicola Stilo - Including 2 tracks recorded with Chet Baker, Aprile 1987 - Splasc(h) Records – CD H 440.2 (posthumous)
- 2002 - LIVE at the SUPINO JAZZ FESTIVAL 1987, Massimo Urbani Quartet - PHILOLOGY (posthumous)
