= Danilo Rea =

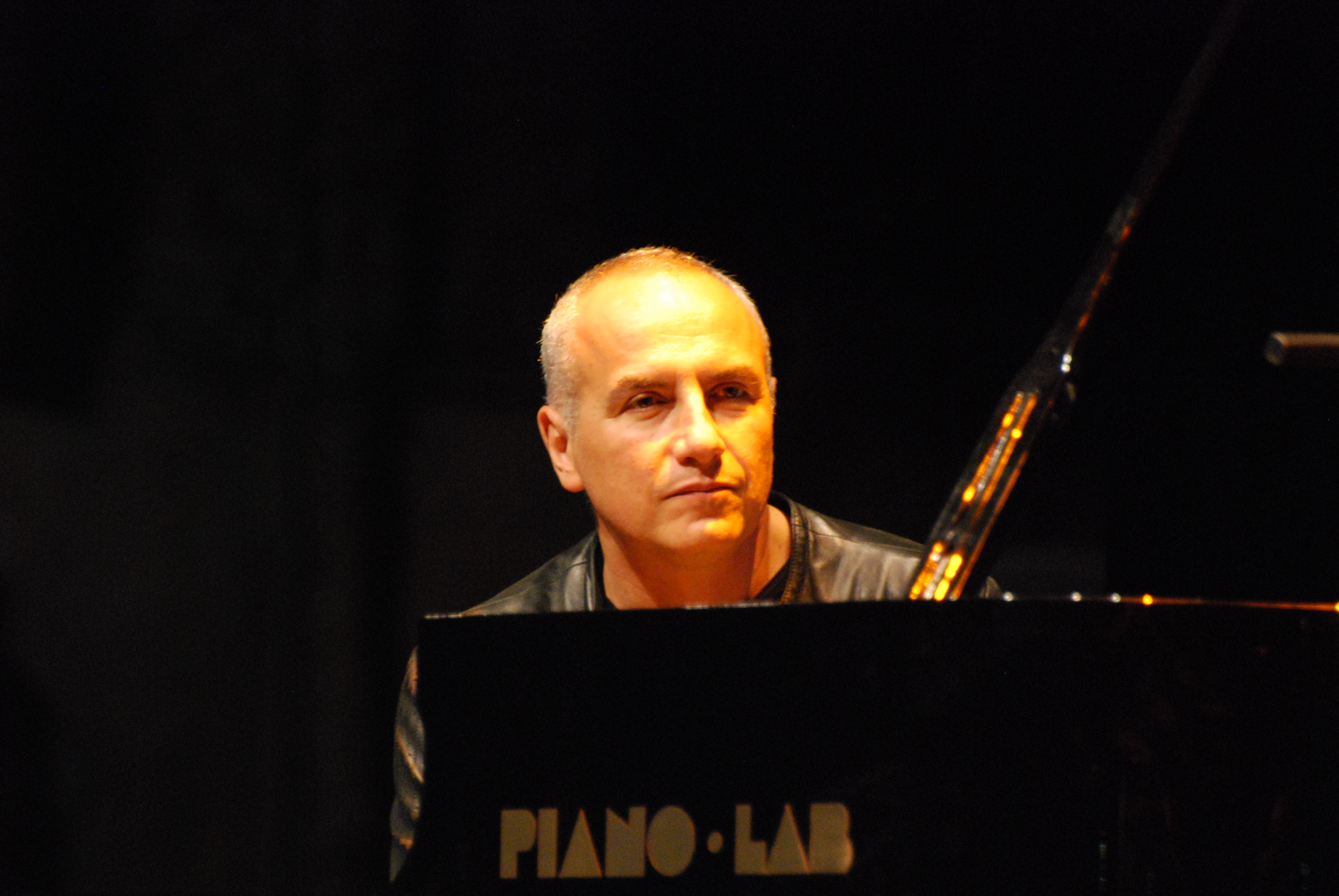

Background information
- Born: August 9, 1957 (age 68); Vicenza, Italy
- Genres: Jazz
- Occupation: Musician
- Instrument: Piano
- Years active: 1980–present
- Labels: CAM Jazz; ACT

Danilo Rea (born 9 August 1957) is an Italian jazz pianist. He is a graduate of the Santa Cecilia music conservatory in Rome. He made his debut with the "Trio di Roma" (with Roberto Gatto and Enzo Pietropaoli) in 1975.

Rea has performed with Chet Baker, Lee Konitz, Steve Grossman, Mimmo Cafiero, Phil Woods, Art Farmer, Curtis Fuller and Kenny Wheeler. In pop music he has performed with Mina, Domenico Modugno, Claudio Baglioni, Pino Daniele, Riccardo Cocciante and Gianni Morandi. He participated in "Requiem for Pierpaolo Pasolini" by Roberto De Simone at the Teatro San Carlo in Napoli.

== Discography ==
=== As leader ===
- Lost in Europe (Via Veneto, 2000)
- Lirico (Egea, 2003)
- Live at Villa Celimontana with Roberto Gatto, Baci Rubati (Wide Sound, 2003)
- Romantica (Venus, 2004)
- So Right with Maria Pia De Vito, Enzo Pietropaoli (CAM Jazz, 2005)
- Jazzitaliano Live 2006 (Casa Del Jazz, 2006)
- Solo (Parco Della Musica, 2007)
- Introverso (EmArcy, 2008)
- Reminiscence with Martux_m (Parco della Musica Records, 2008)
- At Schloss Elmau with Flavio Boltro (ACT, 2010)
- Due come Noi Che with Gino Paoli (Parco Della Musica, 2012)
- Napoli con Amore with Gino Paoli (Parco Della Musica, 2012)
- Something in Our Way (Atlantic/Warner, 2015)
- Notturno (Casa Del Jazz, 2016)
- Bach Is in the Air with Ramin Bahrami (Decca, 2017)

=== As sideman ===
With Claudio Baglioni

- Oltre (CBS, 1990)
- Io Sono Qui, Tra le Ultime Parole D'Addio e Quando Va la Musica (Columbia, 1995)
- Attori e Spettatori (Columbia, 1996)
- Anime in Gioco (Columbia, 1997)
- Sono Io (Columbia/Sony 2003)

With Roberto Gatto

- Notes (Gala, 1986)
- Ask (Gala, 1987)
- Luna (Gala, 1989)
- 7 # (Via Veneto, 1997)
- Progressivamente Omaggio Al Progressive Rock (Casa Del Jazz, 2008)

With Fiorella Mannoia

- Certe Piccole Voci Live (Harpo, 1999)
- Fragile (Columbia, 2001)
- A Te (Oya, 2013)

With Mina

- Uiallalla (PDU, 1989)
- Ti conosco mascherina (PDU, 1990)
- Sorelle Lumière (PDU, 1992)
- Canarino mannaro (GSU, 1994)
- Pappa di latte (PDU, 1995)
- Cremona (PDU, 1996)
- Mina Celentano (1998)
- Olio (PDU, 1999)
- Dalla terra (PDU/S4, 2000)
- Sconcerto (PDU/S4, 2001)
- Napoli secondo estratto (PDU/Sony, 2003)
- Bau (Sony BMG, 2006)
- 12 (American Song Book) (GSU, 2012)

With others

- Luca Aquino, Italian Songbook (ACT, 2019)
- Alex Baroni, C'è di più (Ricordi/BMG, 2004)
- Bob Berg, Steppin' Live in Europe (Red, 1985)
- Fabio Concato, Fabio Concato (Mercury, 1999)
- Pino Daniele, Schizzechea with Love (EMI, 1988)
- Pino Daniele, Un Uomo in Blues (CGD, 1991)
- Edoardo De Angelis, Anche Meglio Di Garibaldi (Durium, 1980)
- Edoardo De Angelis, Mia Madre Parla a Raffica (Spaghetti, 1984)
- Maria Pia De Vito, Hit the Beast! (Phrases, 1990)
- Stefano Di Battista, La Musica di Noi (Alice, 2015)
- Curtis Fuller, Curtis Fuller Meets Roma Jazz Trio (Timeless, 1987)
- Ricky Gianco, Tandem (Edel, 2005)
- Lele Marchitelli, Ma Che Colpa Abbiamo Noi (Epic, 2003)
- Sarah Jane Morris, Cello Songs (Cinik, 2011)
- Gino Paoli & Enrico Rava, Milestones un Incontro in Jazz (Blue Note, 2008)
- Enzo Pietropaoli, Orange Park (Gala, 1990)
- Aldo Romano, Threesome (Universal, 2004)
- Aldo Romano, Etat De Fait (Dreyfus, 2007)
- Renato Sellani, Ampola, (Venus, 2009)
- Carlo Siliotto, Ondina (Philips, 1979)
- Amii Stewart, Magic (RTI Music, 1992)
- Amii Stewart, Intense (Perle Nere Sas, 2012)
- Pietro Tonolo, Simbiosi (Splasc(h), 1995)
- Pietro Tonolo, Sotto La Luna (EGEA, 1999)
- Massimo Urbani, The Blessing (Red, 1993)
- Phil Woods, Embraceable You (Philology, 1989)
- Renato Zero, Zero (RCA, 1992)
- Renato Zero, Amo Capitolo I (Tattica, 2013)
