= The Words and the Days =

Studio album by Enrico Rava
- Released: 2007
- Recorded: December 2005
- Studio: Artesuono Recording Studio; Udine, Italy
- Genre: Jazz
- Length: 72:35
- Label: ECM; ECM 1982
- Producer: Manfred Eicher

Enrico Rava chronology
Quatre (2006)	The Words and the Days (2007)	The Third Man (2007)

The Words and the Days is an album by Italian jazz trumpeter and composer Enrico Rava recorded in December 2005 and released on ECM in 2007.

== Reception ==
The AllMusic review by Thom Jurek awarded the album 4 stars stating "Once more, Rava dazzles with his grasp of the languages of jazz: its textures, its rhythms, its dynamics and above all, of course, its secretive and inventive melodic improvisation. There is no let down here from Easy Living; The Words and the Days is a worthy companion that confidently stands not in the previous recording's shadow, but on a ledge of its own."

Professional ratings
Review scores
Source	Rating
AllMusic	4/5 stars
The Penguin Guide to Jazz Recordings	3.5/4 stars

== Track listing ==
All compositions by Enrico Rava except as indicated

1. "The Words and the Days" – 4:00
2. "Secrets" – 10:31
3. "The Wind" (Russ Freeman) – 4:44
4. "Echoes of Duke" – 6:36
5. "Tutù" – 7:09
6. "Sogni Proibiti" (Rosario Bonaccorso) – 2:11
7. "Todamor" – 6:37
8. "Serpent" – 9:07
9. "Art Deco" (Don Cherry) – 3:18
10. "Traps" (Roberto Gatto) – 3:25
11. "Bob the Cat" – 5:57
12. "Dr. Ra and Mr. Va" – 9:11

== Personnel ==
- Enrico Rava – trumpet
- Gianluca Petrella – trombone
- Andrea Pozza – piano
- Rosario Bonaccorso – bass
- Roberto Gatto – drums
