= Alfred Kramer =

Swiss/Italian jazz drummer (born 1965)

Alfred Kramer (born 1965) is a Swiss/Italian jazz drummer.

== Biography ==
Alfred Kramer was born in 1965 in Frauenfeld, Switzerland. He started playing drums at the age of sixteen after having studied piano for nine years. Since 1986, after moving to Italy, he has been working with musicians like Mal Waldron, Enrico Rava, Scott Hamilton, Pietro Tonolo, Andy McGhee, Enrico Pieranunzi, Paul McCandless, Benny Bailey, Chet Baker, Bob Mintzer, Eddie Daniels, Cedar Walton, Joe Henderson, Steve Lacy, Furio Di Castri, Barre Phillips, Art Lande, Art Farmer, Gianni Basso, Miroslav Vitous and Gil Goldstein. He performed all over Europe and the US and on all major Italian festivals (like Umbria Jazz, Rome, Clusone, etc.) and made a number of worth mentioning records with musicians like Phil Woods, Steve Lacy, Lee Konitz, Joe Lovano and Slide Hampton. He now lives near Florence, Italy, and is working in addition to the drums as a trombone player (four appearances on record) and arranger/conductor as well. He conducted Bansigu Big Band for three years. His jazz drum teaching activity includes various State Conservatories such as Genova, Verona and Padova.

== Discography ==
- Le meurtier dans l'ombrage with Lukas Kramer - Ubu, 1984
- D.O.C. with Marcello Tonolo - Splasc(h), 1986
- Soft Landing with Giannantonio De Vincenzo - Splasc(h), 1987
- Where extremes meet with Luca Flores - Splasc(h), 1987
- Quartet with Hilaria Kramer - Unit, 1988
- Space Jazz Trio Vol. II with Enrico Pieranunzi - Yvp, 1988
- Blew with Lee Konitz ed Enrico Pieranunzi - Philology, 1988
- Phil's Mood with Phil Woods ed Enrico Pieranunzi - Philology, 1988
- Keptorchestra - Nord Sound, 1990
- Moonmaids in my garden with Songs of Maybe - Ubu, 1990
- Nomos with Riccardo Zegna e Danila Satragno - Ariston, 1989
- Ci ritorni in mente - dedicato a Lucio Battisti - Gala, 1989
- Slowly with Pietro Tonolo - Splasc(h), 1989
- Felix with Sandro Gibellini- Tirreno, 1990
- Thinking of you with Marco Tamburini - Pentaflowers, 1992
- In between with Bruno Steffen e Heiner Althaus - Brambus, 1992
- Very fool with Massimo Salvagnini e Lee Konitz - High Tide, 1993
- Zoom with Strani Itinerari - New Label/Amnesty International, 1994
- Piku with Mauro Negri - Sentemo, 1994
- Sweet Sixteencon Steve Lacy / Keptorchestra - Caligola, 1994
- Buried Treasurescon Racine Steffen Group- Brambus, 1994
- Dayscon Marcello Tonolo/Music on Poetry- Caligola, 1995
- Tribute To Nino Rotacon GAP Band- Nel Jazz, 1995
- Algonchinacon Claudio Capurro- DDQ, 1995
- Miss Etnacon Joe Lovano / Keptorchestra- Caligola, 1995
- Straight Aheadcon M.Tamburini / Slide Hampton- Ermitage, 1996
- La Banda Disegnata with Sandro Gibellini- Flex, 1996
- Tindi & Altro with M. Tindiglia- Splasc(h), 1997
- Disguise with Pietro Tonolo- Splasc(h), 1997
- Notte di Luna Calante with GAP Band / Lucio Dalla- Idea, 1997
- Seed Journey with M. Tonolo / Music on Poetry- Caligola, 1998
- Sundance with Bebo Ferra - CDPM Lion 1998
- Memories of Louis with Giampaolo Casati - Tring 1998
- Piccolo Walzer with Riccardo Zegna - Egea, 2001
- Now We Can with Bansigu Big Band – Splas(h), 1999
- Amori Imperfetti with Mario Raia - Egea, 2001
- Live at Siena Jazz with Paolo Birro – Splasc(h), 2002
- Mancini Dry with Massimo Salvagnini – Velut Luna, 2003
- Bansigu Big Band with Lee Konitz – Splasc(h), 2004
- Mr 88 with Gianluca Tagliazucchi Trio feat. Lee Konitz, Splasc(h), 2004
- Piano Kings with Paolo Birro – Azzurra, 2005
- Nuances with Gianluca Tagliazucchi – Splas(h), 2006
- Trufò with Sandro Gibellini – Blue Serge, 2006
- Lennie's Pennies with Pietro Tonolo – Blue Serge, 2006
- Back To Da Capo with Lydian Sound Orchestra – Almar, 2006
- Di Mezzo Il Mare with Egea Orchestra – Egea, 2007
- Canto di Ebano with Gabriele Mirabassi – Egea, 2007
- Un Bacio a Mezzanotte with Paolo Birro – Azzurra 2008
- Changing Walking with Fausto Ferraiuolo – Abeat, 2008
- Scott Hamilton with Scott Hamilton – Kragib, 2009
- Open the Cage with Robert Bonisolo – Almar, 2009
- Dedicated to...with Joanna Rimmer – SAM, 2009
- Jazz In The Park with Sandro Gibellini - Kragib, 2009
- 20! Bansigu Big Band - Music Center, 2013
- Bean And The Boys with Scott Hamilton - Fonè, 2015
- Ballads for Audiophiles with Scott Hamilton - Fonè, 2017
- Castello Nights with Paolo Birro and Aldo Zunino, Fonè, 2017
- I remember you with Dario Carnovale and Lorenzo Conte, Fonè, 2018
