= Gianluca Petrella =

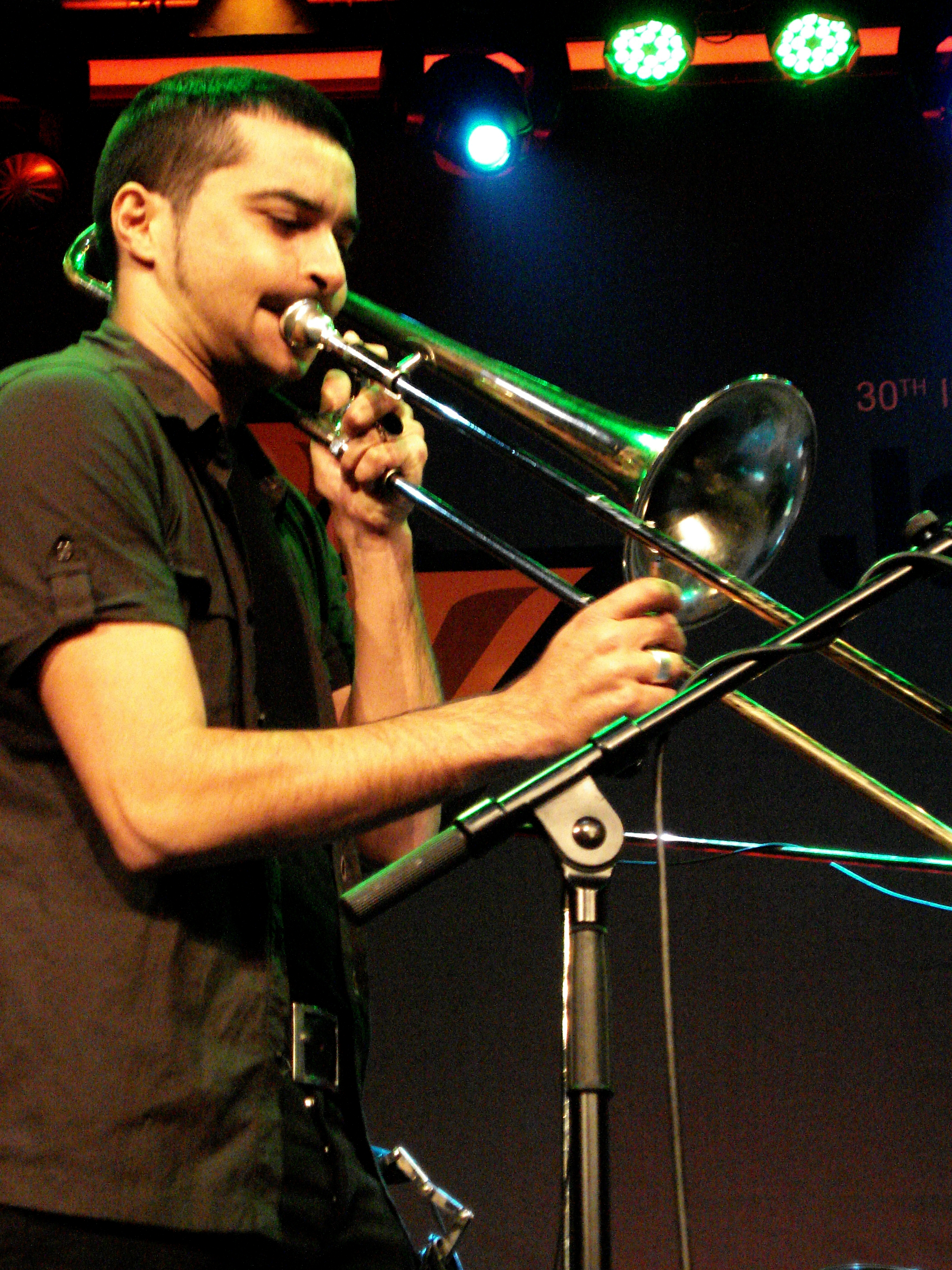
- Gianluca Petrella live at Jazz Festival in Saalfelden, 2009.

Background information
- Born: March 14, 1975; Bari, Italy
- Genre: Jazz
- Occupation: Musician
- Instrument: Trombone
- Years active: 1993–present
- Labels: Auand, ECM
- Website: gianlucapetrella.it

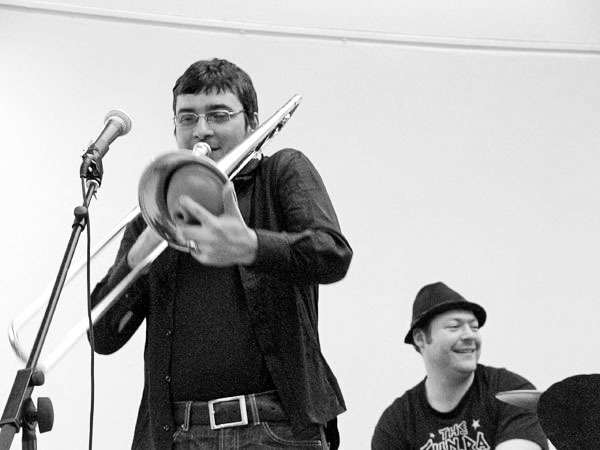
Gianluca Petrella and Kresten Osgood in Aarhus, Denmark

Gianluca Petrella is an Italian jazz trombonist. In 2001 he won Italy's Django d'Or Award as well as Musica Jazz's annual critics poll as Best Young Talent. In 2006 and 2007 he was featured in Down Beat magazine, winning their award for "Best Emerging Artist" in the category for Best Trombonist.

He started his career with Roberto Ottaviano in 1993. He has worked with many international musicians including Joey Calderazzo, Jimmy Owens, Greg Osby, Carla Bley, Pat Metheny, Marc Ducret, Manu Dibango, Nicola Conte, Bobby Previte and Enrico Rava. His group Indigo 4, with Paolino Dalla Porta, Francesco Bearzatti and Fabio Accardi, has recorded the albums Indigo 4 and Kaleido. The recordings were released on Blue Note and were well received by critics. While noted influences include Thelonious Monk, Duke Ellington, and Sun Ra, Petrella also uses loops and sound effects.

== Discography ==
=== As leader ===
- X-Ray (Auand, 2001)
- Under Construction (Wide Sound, 2004)
- Indigo 4 (Blue Note, 2005)
- Kaleido (Blue Note/EMI 2007)
- Jazzitaliano Live 2007 (Casa Del Jazz, 2007)
- Big Guns with Bobby Previte (Auand, 2008)
- Slaves (Spacebone, 2010)
- Il Bagno Turco (EGEA/Parco Della 2011)
- Soupstar (Musica Jazz, 2013)
- Il Bidone (Spacebone, 2013)
- Here Comes a New Challenger (Naive, 2015)
- Ida Lupino with Giovanni Guidi, Louis Sclavis, Gerald Cleaver (ECM, 2016)
- Trio 70's (Casa Del Jazz, 2016)
- Cosmic Renaissance (Pannonica/Spacebone Records, 2016)
- Lost River with Eivind Aarset, Michele Rabbia (ECM, 2019)

=== As sideman ===
With Nicola Conte

- Jet Sounds Revisited (Rambling, 2002)
- Other Directions (Blue Note, 2004)
- Rituals (Schema, 2008)
- Let Your Light Shine On (MPS, 2018)

With Franco D'Andrea

- Round Riff & More (Philology, 2003)
- Jazzitaliano Live 2007 (Casa Del Jazz, 2007)

With Roberto Gatto

- Roberto Gatto Plays Rugantino (CAM, 2000)
- Deep (CAM, 2003)
- Omaggio Al Progressive Rock (Casa Del Jazz, 2008)

With Mop Mop

- Kiss of Kali (INFRACom!, 2008)
- Ritual of the Savage (INFRACom!, 2010)

With Roberto Ottaviano

- Hybrid and Hot (Splasc(H) 1996)
- Pow Wow (Splasc(H) 2003)

With Enrico Rava

- Easy Living (ECM, 2004)
- Happiness Is... (Stunt, 2003)
- The Words and the Days (ECM, 2007)
- Tribe (ECM, 2011)
- Wild Dance (ECM, 2015)

With Rosalia de Souza

- Garota Moderna (Schema, 2002)
- Garota Diferente (Schema 2004)

With others

- Paolo Achenza, Do It Right (Tempo, 1994)
- Mario Biondi, Handful of Soul (Schema, 2006)
- Stefano Bollani, Abbassa la Tua Radio (Ermitage, 2001)
- Paolo Damiani, Ladybird (EGEA, 2004)
- The Dining Rooms, Afrolicious EP (Schema, 2005)
- Paolo Fresu, Around Tuk (Casa Del Jazz, 2016)
- Erica Mou, Bacio Ancora Le Ferite (Auand, 2009)
- Bobby Previte, Pan Atlantic (Auand, 2009)
- Renato Sellani There's No Greater Love (Philology, 2002)
- Bruno Tommaso, Steamboat Bill Jr. (Imprint, 2000)
- Cristina Zavalloni, When You Go Yes Is Yes! (Felmay, 2004)
