= Brazil Festival of Italy =

Event in Bologna

Brazil Festival of Italy is a festival born in Bologna, Italy, in 2002 as a tribute to Italians for their contribution to Brazilian culture. Designed by the Associazione Culturale MAMBO, in 2003 it was officially recognized by the Ministries of Foreign Affairs and Culture and the Brazilian Consulate General in Milan.

== History ==
In its first 19 editions the event has presented hundreds of artists performing in about 300 concerts of Airto Moreira, Arthur Maia, Chico César, Trio Madeira, Pedro Mariano, Trio Corrente, Irio de Paula, Renato Borghetti, Irio de Paula, Robertinho de Paula, Guinga, Maria Gadu, Arrigo Barnabé, Marco Lobo, Rosa Emilia Machado Dias, Dudu Tucci, The Azymuth, Quarteto Maogani, Barbara Casini, Julinho Martins, Gilson Silveira, Daniella Firpo, Fabrizio Bosso, Patricia de Assis, Marcio Rangel, Afroeira, Nelson Machado, Ivete Souza, Marivaldo Paim, Luisa Cottifogli, Nene Ribeiro, Ligia França, Zeduardo Martins, Rogerio Tavares, Josy Nogueira, Kal dos Santos and many others.

In addition to music, the festival has offered 16 exhibitions, 9 film reviews, 15 debates, 21 study courses and internships and 22 appointments with Brazilian cuisine. The festival has involved over 30 local areas, 11 municipalities and 100,000 spectators.
