= Roberto Gatto =

Italian jazz drummer

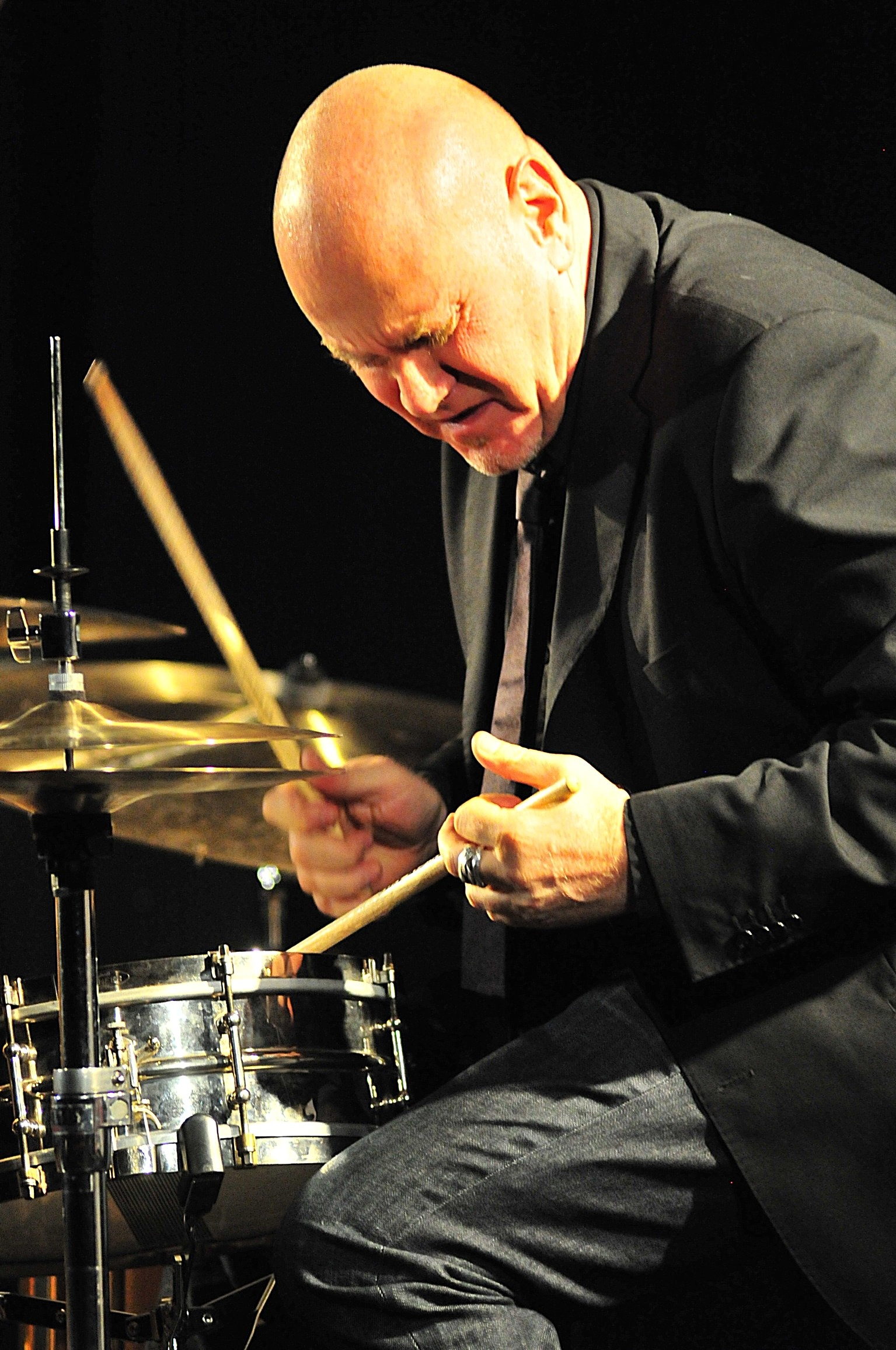
- Gatto in 2012

Background information
- Born: October 6, 1958; Rome, Italy
- Genres: Jazz
- Occupation: Musician
- Instrument: Drums
- Years active: 1970s–present
- Label: CAM Jazz
- Website: www.robertogatto.com

Roberto Gatto is an Italian jazz drummer, born October 6, 1958, in Rome.

He has performed with Lee Konitz, Chet Baker, Bob Berg, Tommy Flanagan, Joe Zawinul, and Joe Lovano and has composed film music. He is also the leader of his own jazz group and a member of the ensemble of Pino Daniele, a Neapolitan singer.

== Discography ==
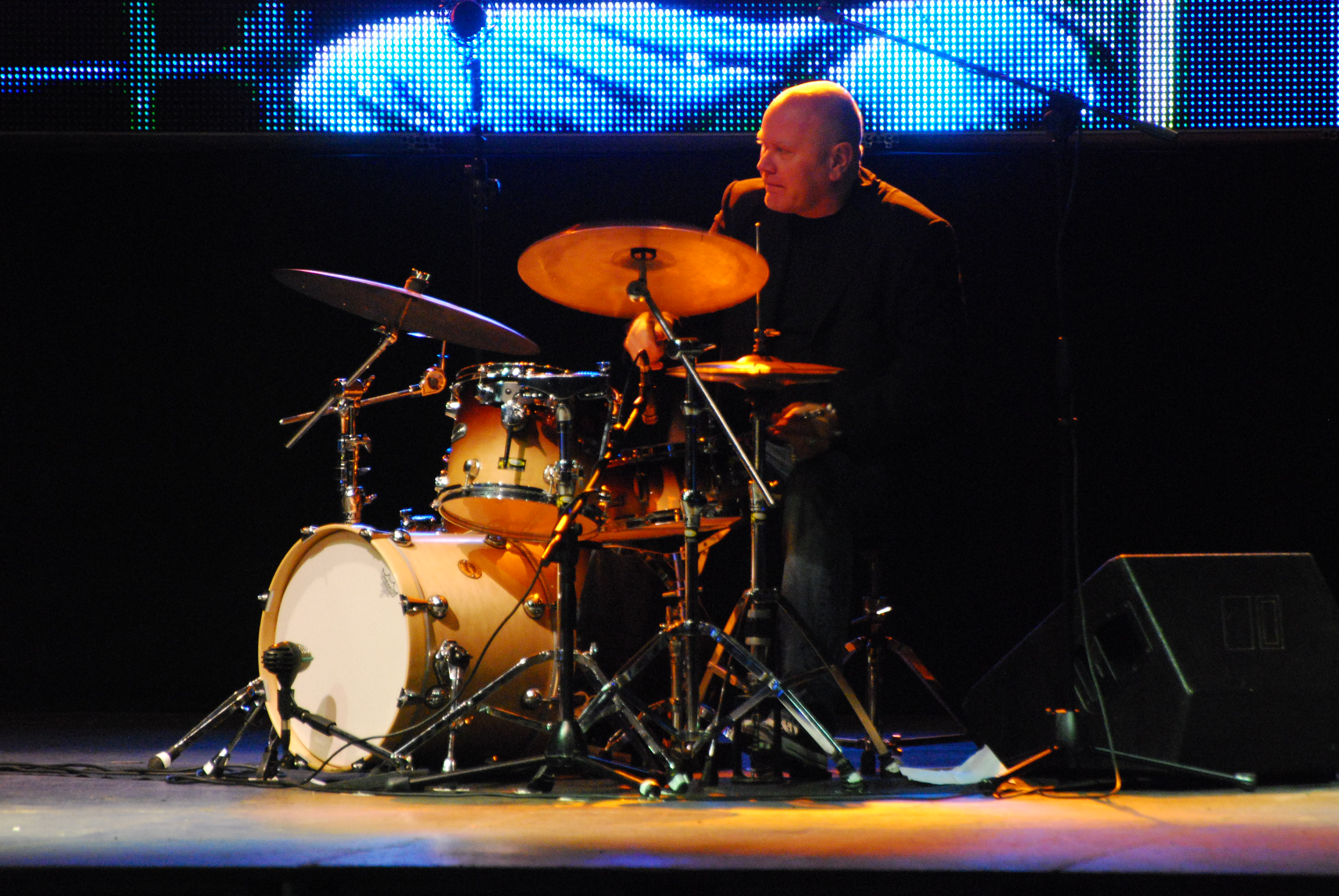
Gatto

=== As leader ===
- Notes (Gala, 1986)
- Ask (Gala, 1987)
- Luna (Gala, 1989)
- 7 # (Via Veneto, 1997)
- Sing Sing Sing (Via Veneto, 1999)
- Roberto Gatto Plays Rugantino (CAM Jazz, 2000)
- Deep (CAM Jazz, 2003)
- Jazzitaliano Live 2006 (Casa del Jazz, 2006)
- Traps (CAM Jazz, 2007)
- Progressivamente (Casa del Jazz, 2008)
- Jazzitaliano Live 2009 (Casa del Jazz, 2009)
- Remembering Shelly (Albore, 2010)
- Remembering Shelly 2 (Albore, 2010)
- Pure Imagination (Albore, 2011)
- Replay (Parco Della Musica, 2012)
- Starship for Lovers with Alfonso Santimone, Pierpaolo Ranieri, (Parco Della Musica, 2014)
- Sixth Sense (Parco Della Musica, 2015)
- Around Zappa with Quintorigo (Incipit, 2015)
- Nino! (Casa del Jazz, 2016)
- NOW! (Abeat, 2017)

=== As sideman ===
With Franco D'Andrea

- Kick Off (Red, 1989)
- Sei Brani Inediti (Red/Musica Jazz 1991)
- Airegin (Red, 1992)

With Paolo Fresu

- Angel (BMG/RCA Victor, 1998)
- Metamorfosi (BMG/RCA Victor, 1999)
- Kind of Porgy & Bess (BMG/RCA Victor, 2002)
- Le Fresiadi (Time in Jazz, 2008)

With Rita Marcotulli

- Pietro Tonolo Quartet Un' Altra Galassia (Fonit Cetra, 1986)
- The Woman Next Door (Label Bleu, 1998)
- Koine (Storie di Note 2002)
- Basilicata Coast to Coast (Alice, 2011)
- Una Piccola Impresa Meridionale Less Is More (Sony, 2013)

With Enrico Pieranunzi

- From Always...to Now! (Edipan, 1978)
- Isis (Soul Note, 1981)
- Jazz Roads (CAM Jazz, 1983)
- In That Dawn of Music (Soul Note, 1993)
- One Lone Star (YVP Music, 2002)
- Moon Pie (Sound Hills, 2004)

With Enrico Rava

- Bella (Philology, 1994)
- Shades of Chet (Via Veneto, 1999)
- La Dolce Vita (CAM Jazz, 2000)
- Montreal Diary (Label Bleu, 2002)
- Renaissance (Venus, 2002)
- What a Day!!! (Platinum 2002)
- Easy Living (ECM, 2004)
- The Words and the Days (ECM, 2007)

With Danilo Rea

- Live at Villa Celimontana (Wide Sound, 2003)
- Romantica (Venus, 2004)
- Introverso (EmArcy, 2008)

With Phil Woods

- Embraceable You (Philology, 1989)
- Live at the Corridoia Jazz Festival (Philology, 1992)
- Phil Woods & Lee Konitz Play Rava (Philology, 2004)

With others

- Franco Ambrosetti, Grazie Italia (Enja, 2000)
- Franck Avitabile, Right Time (Dreyfus, 2000)
- Chet Baker, Soft Journey (Edipan, 1980)
- Chet Baker, Chet On Poetry (Novus, 1989)
- Stefano Battaglia & Paolino Dalla Porta, Confession (Splasc(h), 1991)
- Stefano Battaglia & Paolino Dalla Porta, Flames: Live in Siena (Splasc(h), 1996)
- Stefano di Battista, Jazzitaliano Live 2009 (Casa del Jazz, 2009)
- Stefano di Battista & Danilo Rea, La Musica di Noi (Alice, 2015)
- Bob Berg, Steppin' Live in Europe (Red, 1985)
- Stefano Bollani, Abbassa la Tua Radio (Ermitage, 2001)
- Salvatore Bonafede, Ortodoxa (Red, 2001)
- Sergio Cammariere, Il Pane, Il Vino e La Visione (Via Veneto/Capitol 2006)
- Barbara Casini & Enrico Rava, Vento (Label Bleu, 2000)
- Roberto Ciotti, No More Blue (Time Music, 1988)
- Paolo Damiani & Paolo Fresu, Eso (Splasc(h), 1994)
- Pino Daniele, Passi D'Autore (RCA, 2004)
- Ivano Fossati, La Disciplina Della Terra (Columbia, 2000)
- Curtis Fuller, Curtis Fuller Meets Roma Jazz Trio (Timeless, 1987)
- Lee Konitz, A Day in Florence (Philology,)
- Grazia Di Michele, Grazia di Michele (WEA, 1991)
- Mietta, Volano Le Pagine (Fonit Cetra, 1991)
- Mimmo Locasciulli, Adesso Glielo Dico (RCA 1989)
- Mina, Caterpillar (PDU, 1991)
- Mina, Sorelle Lumiere (EMI/PDU, 1992)
- Minnie Minoprio, Minnie (Hollywood, 1983)
- Simona Molinari, Dr. Jekill Mr. Hyde (Atlantic, 2012)
- Ennio Morricone, Il Bandito Dagli Occhi Azzurri...Correva L'Anno di Grazia 1870 (CAM Jazz, 1992)
- Sal Nistico, Empty Room (Red, 1988)
- Riz Ortolani, La Rivincita di Natale/Il Cuore Altrove (ConcertOne, 2003)
- Maria Pia De Vito, Hit the Beast! (Phrases, 1990)
- Enzo Pietropaoli, Orange Park (Gala, 1990)
- Quintorigo, In Cattivita (Universal, 2003)
- Manuel De Sica, Con Alma (Dire)
- Teresa De Sio, Teresa de Sio (Philips, 1982)
- Massimo Urbani, Easy to Love (Red, 1987)
- Massimo Urbani, The Blessing (Red, 1993)
- Ornella Vanoni, Sheherazade (East West, 1996)
- Miroslav Vitous, Ziljabu Nights Live at Theater Guetersloh (Intuition, 2016)
- Eric Vloeimans, Hidden History (Challenge, 2003)
