= Pietro Tonolo =

- Born: 30 May 1959; Mirano, Italy
- Genres: Jazz
- Occupations: Musician, composer
- Instrument: Saxophone
- Labels: Splasc(h), Egea, Label Bleu, ObliqSound, Parco Della Musica, Casa Del Jazz, Alma
- Website: www.pietrotonolo.me

Pietro Tonolo (born 30 May 1959) is an Italian jazz saxophone player and composer.

== Biography ==
He was born in Mirano, Italy. Pietro Tonolo gave up a career as a classical violinist to become a jazz sax player. Around that time, he moved to Milan, where he played with some of Italy's best jazz musicians, including Franco D'Andrea, Luigi Bonafede, Larry Nocella, Massimo Urbani, Rita Marcotulli and Enrico Rava.

In 1982, Tonolo joined the Gil Evans Orchestra, playing with notable musicians as Steve Lacy, Lew Soloff and Ray Anderson. He later went on to perform in jazz clubs and on radio and television around Europe and the United States, both as a sideman and as a leader with his own band. He was a steady member of the Paul Motian’s Electric Bebop Band from 1999 to 2004. Other notable collaborators have included the likes of Kenny Clarke, Roswell Rudd, Sal Nistico, Chet Baker, Lee Konitz, John Surman, Steve Swallow, Gil Goldstein, Barry Altschul, Joe Chambers, Henri Texier, Aldo Romano, Kenny Wheeler, Eliot Zigmund and Tony Oxley.

Besides jazz, Tonolo has been collaborating with contemporary musicians and ensembles ('Ex Novo Ensemble', 'Laboratorio Novamusica', 'Nex Time Ensemble', 'Sentieri Selvaggi', 'Orchestra d'archi Italiana', plus the sax quartet 'Arundo Donax'). He is currently teaching at the Conservatory of Vicenza and Siena Jazz international masterclasses.

He lives in Vicenza.

== Discography ==
=== As leader ===
- Quartet Quintet Sextet (Splasc(h), 1984)
- Slowly (Splasc(h), 1991)
- Alliance (Penta Flowers, 1993)
- Tresse (Splasc(h), 1993)
- Simbiosi (Splasc(h), 1995)
- Amigdala (Velut Luna, 1996)
- Un Veliero All'Orizzonte (Egea, 1997)
- Disguise (Splasc(h), 1997)
- Monologues (Splasc(h), 1998)
- Sotto La Luna with Danilo Rea (Egea, 1999)
- Portrait of Duke (Label Bleu, 2000)
- Luna Park (Egea, 2000)
- Retro (Egea, 2000)
- Autunno with Paolo Birro (Egea, 2001)
- Glasswater (Splasc(h), 2001)
- Farfalle (Egea, 2002)
- Oltremare (Egea, 2004)
- Italian Songs (Egea, 2005)
- Lennie's Pennies (Blue Serge, 2006)
- Your Songs: The Music of Elton John (ObliqSound, 2007)
- Peace (ObliqSound, 2007)
- Mirando (Egea, 2009)
- The Translators (Parco Della Musica, 2009)
- Jazzitaliano Live 2009 (Casa Del Jazz, 2010)
- Corner Brilliance with Eliot Zigmund (Alma, 2012)
- Dajaloo (Parco Della Musica, 2013)
- Too Many Pockets (Parco Della Musica, 2018)
- Songs We Like (Fone Jazz, 2019)

=== As sideman ===
- Gap Band, Tribute to Nino Rota (Nel Jazz/Nelmondo, 1995)
- Rita Marcotulli, Un' Altra Galassia (Fonit Cetra, 1986)
- Rita Marcotulli, Umbria Jazz All Stars North Carolina (Umbria Jazz, 1988)
- Paul Motian, Europe (Winter & Winter, 2001)
- Paul Motian, Holiday for Strings (Winter & Winter, 2002)
- Enrico Pieranunzi, In That Dawn of Music (Musica/Soul Note, 1993)
- Enrico Rava, Andanada (Soul Note, 1983)
- Danilo Rea, Jazzitaliano Live 2006 (Casa Del Jazz, 2006)
- Roberto Zanetti, Minor Time (Dodicilune, 2014)
