= Maria Pia De Vito =

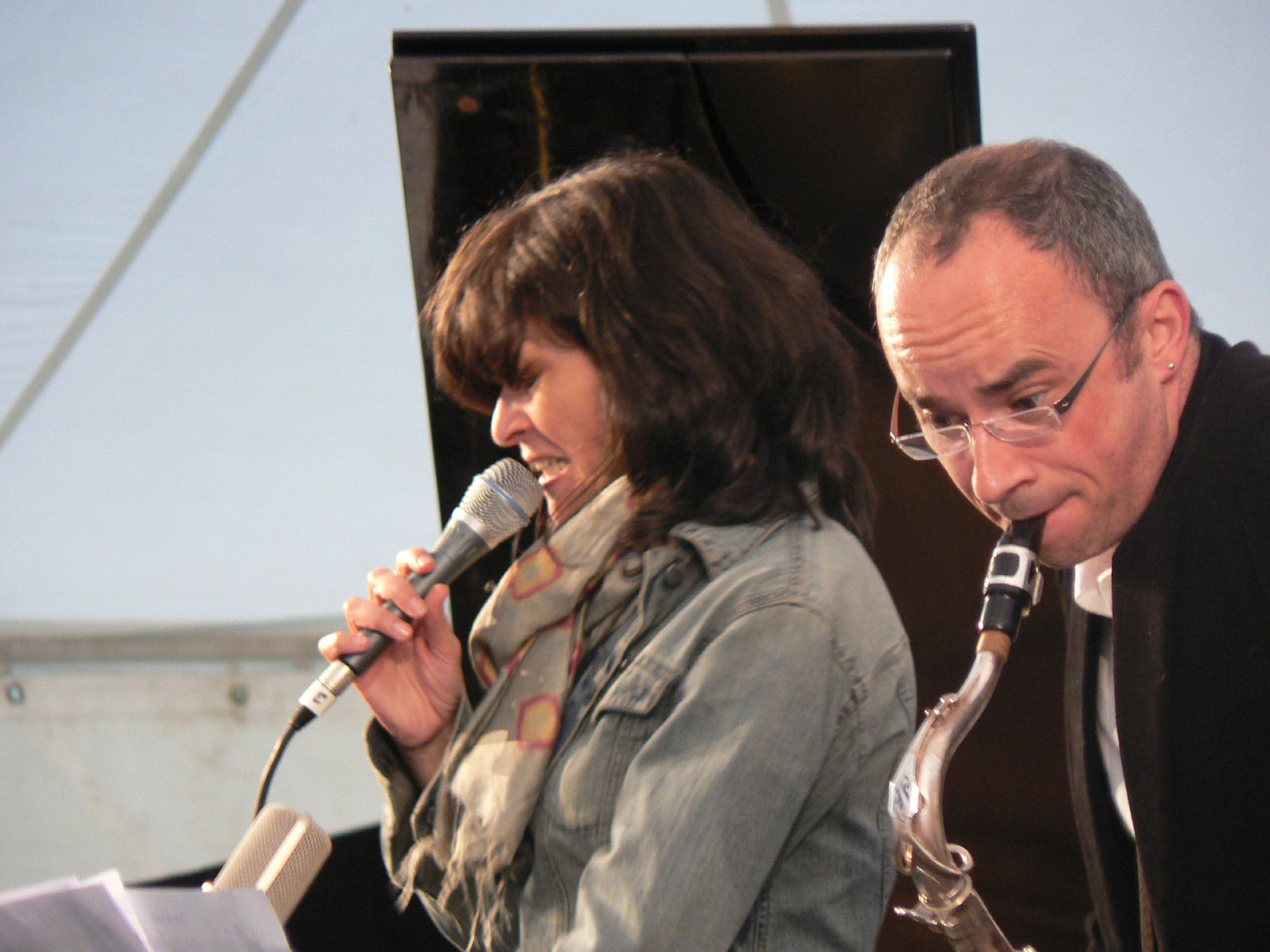
- Maria Pia De Vito and Julian Arguelles (Appleby Jazz Festival 2007)

Background information
- Born: August 17, 1960; Naples, Italy
- Genres: Jazz, classical, world, folk, electronic, avant-garde
- Occupations: Singer, composer, arranger, musician
- Instrument: Vocals
- Years active: 1976–present
- Labels: Egea, Provocateur, ECM
- Website: www.mariapiadevito.com

Maria Pia De Vito is an Italian jazz singer, composer, and arranger.

== Career ==
A native of Naples, Italy, she studied classical music, opera, and Italian folk music. In 1976, she performed folk songs as a singer, guitarist, and pianist. In 1980, she sang with jazz musicians such as Art Ensemble of Chicago, Michael Brecker, Uri Caine, Peter Erskine, Paolo Fresu, Billy Hart, Maria Joao, Nguyên Lê, Dave Liebman, Bruno Tommaso, Gianluigi Trovesi, Steve Turre, Miroslav Vitous, and Joe Zawinul. In the 1980s, she worked with Toots Thielemans and Mike Stern. She collaborated with Rita Marcotulli in the 1990s on the albums Nauplia and Fore Paese. She has often worked with the British composer Colin Towns and with pianist John Taylor.

== Discography ==
=== As leader ===
- Nauplia with Rita Marcotulli (Egea, 1995)
- Fore Paese (PoloSud, 1996)
- Triboh with Arto Tuncboyaciyan, Rita Marcotulli (PoloSud, 1998)
- Phone (Egea, 1998)
- Verso (Provocateur, 2000)
- Nel Respiro (J SHP, 2002)
- Tumulti with Patrice Heral (Il Manifesto, 2003)
- So Right with Danilo Rea (CAM Jazz, 2005)
- Jazzitaliano Live 2007 (Casa Del Jazz, 2007)
- Dialektos with Huw Warren (Parco Della Musica, 2008)
- O Pata Pata with Huw Warren (Parco Della Musica, 2011)
- Il Pergolese with Francois Couturier (ECM, 2013)
- Lazy Songs with Enzo Pietropaoli (Casa Del Jazz, 2016)
- Core (Via Veneto Jazz, 2017)
- Moresche e Altre Invenzioni (Parco Della Musica, 2018)

=== As guest ===
- Pietro Tonolo, Un Veliero All'Orizzonte (Egea, 1997)
- Colin Towns, Still Life (Provocateur, 1998)
- Colin Towns, Dreaming Man with Blue Suede Shoes (Provocateur, 1999)
- David Linx, One Heart, Three Voices (E-motive 2005)
- Giorgio Gaslini, Il Brutto Anatrocolo (Time in Jazz, 2008)
- Guinga, Porto Da Madama (Selo Sesc, 2015)
