= Giovanni Mirabassi =

Italian jazz pianist

Giovanni Mirabassi is a Paris-based Italian jazz pianist, born 4 May 1970 in Perugia, Italy. Self-taught, he learned by listening to Bud Powell, Art Tatum, and Oscar Peterson. He is strongly influenced by Enrico Pieranunzi. At seventeen, after a few important experiences in Italy (he played with Chet Baker in 1987 and with Steve Grossman in 1988), he settled in Paris in 1992.

In 1996, he recorded his first album with Pierre-Stéphane Michel on upright bass and Flavio Boltro on trumpet, winning the grand prix and the best soloist prize at the Concours International de Jazz d'Avignon, presided by Daniel Humair.

In 2001, Giovanni Mirabassi released his first solo album, Avanti!, a collection of songs about revolutions, which he had been thinking of for years. This record was an important milestone in his career (Django d’Or of the best young talent and a Victoire du Jazz in 2002). Mirabassi began touring regularly, as part a trio or alone. He became very popular, especially in Japan.

In 2005, he released a new CD, Prima o poi, featuring a trio and a quartet, on the Minium label. A year later, he released another record of standards of French chanson, Cantopiano, which brought together his two preferred musical universes. Those two CDs, still saluted by public and media, anchored his unusual position in the world of jazz.

Over a period of ten years, Giovanni Mirabassi has produced a dozen CDs and DVDs (some of them concerts released only in Japan) and performed all around the world.

== Discography ==
- Architectures (Sketch, 1999)
- Dal Vivo! (Sketch, 2001)
- Avanti! (Sketch, 2001)
- Air (Sketch, 2003)
- Giovanni Mirabassi & Andrzej Jagodziński Trio (Atelier Sawano, 2003)
- Leo en Toute Liberte (La Memoire et La Mer, 2004)
- C Minor (Atelier Sawano, 2005)
- Prima O Poi (Discograph, 2005)
- Cantopiano Minium, (Discograph, 2006)
- Terra Furiosa (Discograph, 2008)
- Out of Track (Discograph, 2009)
- Spirabassi (Bee Jazz, 2009)
- Adelante! (Discograph, 2011)
- Tribute to Bill (Star, 2011)
- Viva V.E.R.D.I. (CAM Jazz, 2013)
- Naufrages (Sony, 2015)
- Chansons Pour Demain (EPM Musique, 2016)
- Live in Germany (CAM Jazz, 2017)
- Intermezzo (Jazz Eleven, 2019)
- Più Avanti! (Jazz Eleven, 2026)
