= Electric Five =

Studio album by Enrico Rava
- Released: December 31, 1995
- Recorded: September 29–30, 1994
- Genre: Jazz
- Length: 42:42
- Label: SoulNote
- Producer: Giovanni Bonandrini

Enrico Rava chronology
For Bix and Pops (1994)	Electric Five (1995)	Italian Ballads (1996)

Electric Five is an album by Italian jazz trumpeter and composer Enrico Rava recorded in 1994 and released on the Soul Note label.

== Reception ==
Professional ratings
Review scores
Source	Rating
AllMusic	3/5 stars

As it was written in JazzTimes 5/96 review: "ELECTRIC FIVE is an aural approximation of a Fellini film: surrealistic, indulgent in its broad humor, and ultimately big-hearted...".

== Track listing ==
All compositions by Enrico Rava except as indicated

1. ″Da Silva″ - 5:31
2. "Fragile" - 3:41
3. "The Fearless Five" - 4:26
4. "Lavori Casalinghi" - 5:19
5. "Milestones" (Miles Davis)- 5:05
6. "Overboard" - 6:55
7. "La Strada" (Nino Rota) - 1:52
8. "Fefè" - 4:48
9. "Satie" - 4:39
10. "Lady Orlando" - 2:28
11. "Boplicity" (Cleo Henry) - 3:16

- Recorded at MU REC Studio, Milano, Italy, 1994-09-29 and 1994-09-30

== Personnel ==
- Enrico Rava - trumpet, flugelhorn
- Domenico Caliri - electric guitar, classical guitar (10)
- Roberto Cecchetto - electric guitar
- Giovanni Maier - bass
- U.T. Gandhi - drums

Special Guest

- Gianluigi Trovesi - alto saxophone, bass clarinet
