= Curtis Fuller Meets Roma Jazz Trio =

Studio album by Curtis Fuller and Trio di Roma
- Released: 1984
- Recorded: December 23, 1982
- Studio: Sonic Studio, Roma
- Genre: Jazz
- Length: 46:52
- Label: Timeless; SJP 204
- Producer: Alberto Alberti

Curtis Fuller chronology
Giant Bones at Nice (1980)	Curtis Fuller Meets Roma Jazz Trio (1984)	Blues-ette Part II (1993)

Curtis Fuller Meets Roma Jazz Trio is an album by trombonist Curtis Fuller which was recorded in Italy in 1982 and released on the Dutch Timeless label.

== Track listing ==
1. "Impressions" (John Coltrane) – 6:38
2. "R.E.D.'s Delights" (Curtis Fuller) – 6:49
3. "Jazz Island" (Fuller) – 5:42
4. "Naima" (Coltrane) – 8:19
5. "Afternoon in Paris (John Lewis) – 6:41
6. "Blue Bossa" (Kenny Dorham) – 5:15

== Personnel ==
- Curtis Fuller – trombone
- Danilo Rea – piano
- Enzo Pietropaoli – bass
- Roberto Gatto – drums
