= The Third Man (album) =

Studio album by Enrico Rava & Stefano Bollani
- Released: October 10, 2007
- Recorded: November 2006
- Studio: RTSI; Lugano, Switzerland
- Genre: Jazz
- Length: 72:02
- Label: ECM; ECM 2020
- Producer: Manfred Eicher

Enrico Rava chronology
The Words and the Days (2005)	The Third Man (2007)	New York Days (2009)

The Third Man is an album by Italian jazz trumpeter Enrico Rava and pianist Stefano Bollani, recorded in Switzerland in November 2006 and released on ECM on October 10, 2007.

== Reception ==
The AllMusic review by Thom Jurek states, "The Third Man is a brilliant collaboration and a beautifully accessible as well as adventurous offering."

The Penguin Guide to Jazz Recordings calls The Third Man “a relatively unusual record for the trumpeter in its spareness, but it stands with his very finest work.”

Professional ratings
Review scores
Source	Rating
AllMusic	4/5 stars
The Penguin Guide to Jazz Recordings	3.5/4 stars

== Track listing ==
All tracks are written by Enrico Rava, except as noted.

No.	Title	Writer(s)	Length
1.	"Estate"	Bruno Brighetti; Bruno Martino	8:39
2.	"The Third Man"	Bollani; Rava	5:10
3.	"Sun Bay"		4:35
4.	"Retrato em branco y preto"	Antonio Carlos Jobim	7:46
5.	"Birth of a Butterfly"		7:28
6.	"Cumpari"		4:51
7.	"Sweet Light"		6:11
8.	"Santa Teresa"	Bollani	4:48
9.	"Felipe"	Moacir Santos	5:10
10.	"In Search of Titina"		4:27
11.	"Retrato em branco y preto, Var."	Jobim	7:42
12.	"Birth of a Butterfly, Var."		5:15

== Personnel ==
- Enrico Rava – trumpet
- Stefano Bollani – piano
