= Anne Ducros =

French jazz singer

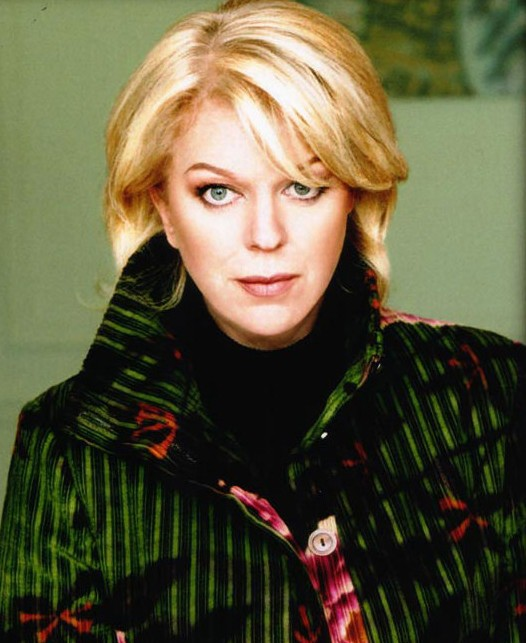

Background information
- Born: 1 December 1959 (age 66); Longfossé, Pas-de-Calais, France
- Genres: Jazz
- Occupation: Singer
- Years active: 1989–present
- Labels: Dreyfus, Naive

Anne Ducros is a French jazz singer.

== Career ==
In 1990, she started touring the world for the next ten years with musicians such as Chick Corea, Jacky Terrasson, and Kenny Barron.

She recorded the album Piano, Piano (Dreyfus, 2006) with pianists Corea, Enrico Pieranunzi, René Urtreger, and Benoît de Mesmay. The album includes standards such as "God Bless the Child" and "Never Let Me Go". Her cover of the song "Taking a Chance on Love" was used in the 2005 Chanel Chance perfume commercials.

Jack Goodstein of the Seattle Post-Intelligencer, described her album Either Way as "perhaps the finest album from a jazz vocalist I've heard this year, and certainly the most interesting." Christopher Loudon of JazzTimes called Ducros part Blossom Dearie, part Annie Ross, and part Yma Sumac.

== Discography ==
- Purple Songs (Dreyfus, 2001)
- Close Your Eyes (Dreyfus, 2003)
- Urban Tribe (Dreyfus, 2007)
- Ella My Dear (Plus Loin, 2010)
- Either Way: From Marilyn to Ella (Naive, 2013)
- Brother? Brother! (2017)
- Something (Sunset, 2020)
