= Guido Di Leone =

Italian jazz guitarist (1964–2025)

- Born: 24 January 1964; Bari, Italy
- Died: 11 November 2025 (aged 61); Bari, Italy
- Occupation: Guitarist
- Years active: 1980–2025

Guido Di Leone (24 January 1964 – 11 November 2025) was an Italian jazz guitarist.

Born in Bari, Di Leone was the son of the jazz pianist Nino. His collaborations include Franco Cerri, Paolo Fresu, Mark Murphy, Joey Baron, Jerry Bergonzi and Dado Moroni. He founded the music academy Il Pentagramma and the Duke Jazz Club.

Di Leone died from a heart attack in Bari, on 11 November 2025, at the age of 61.

== Albums ==
- All for Hall (1990)
- Never swingin' in the rain (1992)
- Scherzo (1993)
- Hearing a Rhapsody (1995)
- Terra do sol – Abrasileirado (1998)
- Con alma (2000)
- Body and Soul (2001)
- Ventiseifebbraioduemilauno (2001)
- Seven come £leven (2001)
- Gianni Basso in Bari (2002)
- Totò jazz (2003)
- Isole (2004)
- Flamingo – Jazz'n Mambo (2005)
- Duets – Tribute (2006)
- Walkin' Ahead (2006)
- Trio de Janeiro (2006)
- Blue Night (2008)
- Bossa na minha casa (2008)
- Sax Line (2009)
- Standards on Guitar (2010)

== Publication ==
- Metodo facile e completo di Teoria Jazz (2002)
