= Tribe (Enrico Rava album) =

Studio album by Enrico Rava Quintet
- Released: October 21, 2011
- Recorded: October 2010, ArteSuono Studio, Udine
- Genre: Jazz
- Length: 64:46
- Label: ECM; ECM 2218
- Producer: Manfred Eicher

Enrico Rava chronology
New York Days (2009)	Tribe (2011)	Rava on the Dance Floor (2013)

Tribe is an album by Italian jazz trumpeter and composer Enrico Rava's Quintet recorded in Italy in 2010 and released on the ECM label.

== Reception ==
Professional ratings
Review scores
Source	Rating
Allmusic	3.5/5 stars

The Allmusic review by Thom Jurek awarded the album 3½ stars stating "whether things get woolly and rugged or remain spacious and melodic, lyricism itself is still at the core, and in this, according to Rava, is a much greater freedom to explore. Given the lovely sonic evidence on Tribe, his position is difficult to argue with. This is a band that is exciting, fresh, and inventive. How they grow will be fascinating to observe".

== Track listing ==
All compositions by Enrico Rava except as indicated

1. "Amnesia" – 4:34
2. "Garbage Can Blues" 3:34
3. "Choctaw" – 5:38
4. "Incognito" – 10:00
5. "Cornettology" – 8:16
6. "F. Express" – 7:32
7. "Tears for Neda" – 6:16
8. "Song Tree" – 3:36
9. "Paris Baguette" – 3:39
10. "Planet Earth" – 3:04
11. "Tribe" – 5:00
12. "Improvisation" (Enric Rava, Gianluca Petrella, Giovanni Guidi, Gabriele Evangelista, Fabrizio Sferra) – 3:37

== Personnel ==
- Enrico Rava – trumpet
- Gianluca Petrella – trombone
- Giovanni Guidi – piano
- Gabriele Evangelista – double bass
- Fabrizio Sferra – drums
- Giacomo Ancillotto – guitar (tracks 1 & 6–8)
