= The Pilgrim and the Stars =

Studio album by Enrico Rava
- Released: 1975
- Recorded: June 1975
- Studio: Tonstudio Bauer; Ludwigsburg, W. Germany
- Genre: Jazz; avant-garde jazz; post-bop
- Length: 39:42
- Label: ECM 1063 ST
- Producer: Manfred Eicher

Enrico Rava chronology
Quotation Marks (1973)	The Pilgrim and the Stars (1975)	The Plot (1976)

The Pilgrim and the Stars is an album by Italian jazz trumpeter and composer Enrico Rava recorded in June 1975 and released on ECM later that year—his debut for the label. The quartet features rhythm section John Abercrombie, Palle Danielsson and Jon Christensen.

== Reception ==
Professional ratings
Review scores
Source	Rating
AllMusic	4/5 stars
The Penguin Guide to Jazz Recordings	4/4 stars

The AllMusic review by Matt Collar awarded the album 4 stars stating:

"Enrico Rava's debut for ECM, 1975's The Pilgrim and the Stars, is a stellar progressive jazz effort from the Italian trumpeter who was then just coming into his own... This is just the kind of contemplative and experimental Euro-jazz that ECM made its name on, but with some seriously cinematic post-bop guts. In that sense, The Pilgrim and the Stars sounds something akin to a soundtrack to a '70s neo-noir film—albeit a deliciously avant-garde one."

== Track listing ==
All tracks are written by Enrico Rava except as noted.

Side I
No.	Title	Length
1.	"The Pilgrim and the Stars"	9:45
2.	"Parks"	1:48
3.	"Bella"	9:20
Total length:		20:53

Side II
No.	Title	Writer(s)	Length
1.	"Pesce Naufrago"		5:15
2.	"Surprise Hotel"		1:55
3.	"By the Sea"	Enrico Rava; Graciela Rava	4:49
4.	"Blancasnow"		6:50
Total length:			18:49 39:42

== Personnel ==
- Enrico Rava – trumpet
- John Abercrombie – guitar
- Palle Danielsson – bass
- Jon Christensen – drums
