= Wild Dance =

Studio album by Enrico Rava Quartet with Gianluca Petrella
- Released: August 28, 2015
- Recorded: January 2015
- Studio: Artesuono Recording Studios, Udine, Italy
- Genre: Jazz
- Length: 66:40
- Label: ECM; ECM 2456
- Producer: Manfred Eicher

Enrico Rava chronology
Rava on the Dance Floor (2012)	Wild Dance (2015)

Wild Dance is an album by Italian trumpeter and composer Enrico Rava's Quartet with trombonist Gianluca Petrella recorded in 2015 and released on the ECM label.

== Reception ==
Professional ratings
Review scores
Source	Rating
All About Jazz	4/5 stars
The Guardian	3/5 stars

All About Jazz reviewer Mark Sullivan called it "Another very enjoyable recording from the ever-reliable trumpeter" and said, "Here's hoping for many more small group projects from him. This quartet certainly deserves another recording date".

In The Guardian, John Fordham wrote "Rava’s Miles-inspired lyricism and tone control on slow music often takes centre stage in his work, but though the softly meditative "Space Girl" (with its distant intimations of drum uprisings that don't materialise), or the wistful "Sola" and "Overboard" show that side of him, the blurted Ornette Coleman-like flurries of "Infant" or "Happy Shades", the guitar-driven swinger "Cornette", or the soft bop "F Express", over the excellent Enrico Morello's bustling brushwork, represent effortlessly inventive uptempo jazz playing. The closing "Frogs", with its upwardly scuttling two-horn melody over guitar and bass vamps and its rattling drumwork, is the tour de force".

In JazzTimes, Thomas Conrad wrote "Rava has rarely worked with a guitarist, and it is striking how a guitar changes the atmosphere of a Rava ensemble. There is much more open space. Diodati does not so much accompany Rava as array shifting backgrounds containing strands of independent thought and pools of light. Rava is clearly inspired ... Most of the other tracks are short, and bring in trombonist Gianluca Petrella, a longtime Rava collaborator. Rava loves to duel with him, in loose unisons and cacophonous contrapuntal joint ventures. But collective improvisation, exciting when used judiciously for contrast, is limiting when it is overdone. It precludes the strong soloists here from truly soloing. It prevents Rava from fully exploring the potential of his new relationship with Diodati. Petrella is one of the best trombonists in jazz, but this album would have been more interesting without him".

== Track listing ==
All compositions by Enrico Rava except where noted

1. "Diva" – 7:38
2. "Space Girl" – 7:20
3. "Don't" – 4:45
4. "Infant" – 3:07
5. "Sola" – 4:44
6. "Not Funny" – 2:55
7. "Wild Dance" – 2:59
8. "F. Express" – 4:41
9. "Cornette" – 3:11
10. "Overboard" – 5:21
11. "Happy Shades" – 2:53
12. "Monkitos" – 3:41
13. "Improvisation" (Enrico Rava, Francesco Diodati, Gabriele Evangelista, Enrico Morello) – 5:21
14. "Frogs" – 8:04

== Personnel ==
- Enrico Rava – trumpet
- Gianluca Petrella – trombone
- Francesco Diodati – guitar
- Gabriele Evangelista – double bass
- Enrico Morello – drums
