= Il Giro Del Giorno in 80 Mondi =

Studio album by Enrico Rava
- Released: 1976
- Recorded: February 1972
- Genre: Jazz
- Length: 33:13
- Label: Black Saint
- Producer: Giacomo Pellicciotti

Enrico Rava chronology
Il Giro Del Giorno in 80 Mondi (1976)	Quotation Marks (1973)

Il Giro Del Giorno in 80 Mondi is an album by Italian jazz trumpeter and composer Enrico Rava recorded in 1972 and originally released in the International label and rereleased on the Italian Black Saint label in 1976.

== Reception ==
The Allmusic review by Michael G. Nastos awarded the album 4½ stars calling it "A recording that is "out" and sometimes funky".

Professional ratings
Review scores
Source	Rating
Allmusic	4.5/5 stars

== Track listing ==
All compositions by Enrico Rava except as indicated

1. "C.T.'s Dance" - 5:29
2. "Back to the Sun" - 5:09
3. "Xanadu" - 4:32
4. "Attica" - 2:24
5. "Il Giro del Giorno in 80 Mondi" - 7:11
6. "To Start With Rava" - 5:13
7. "Olhos de Gato" (Carla Bley) - 3:15

- Recorded at Fonit-Cetra Studios in Turin, Italy in February 1972

== Personnel ==
- Enrico Rava - trumpet
- Bruce Johnson - guitar
- Marcello Melis - bass
- Chip White - drums
