= Enrico Rava Quartet =

Album by Enrico Rava

Studio album by the Enrico Rava Quartet
- Released: 1978
- Recorded: March 1978
- Studio: Tonstudio Bauer; Ludwigsburg, West Germany
- Genre: Jazz
- Length: 42:08
- Label: ECM 1122
- Producer: Manfred Eicher

Enrico Rava chronology
The Plot (1976)	Enrico Rava Quartet (1978)	Ah (1979)

Enrico Rava Quartet is an album by the Enrico Rava Quartet, recorded in March 1978 and released on ECM later that year. The quartet features trombonist Roswell Rudd and rhythm section Jean-François Jenny-Clark and Aldo Romano.

== Reception ==
Professional ratings
Review scores
Source	Rating
AllMusic	4/5 stars
DownBeat	4/5 stars
The Penguin Guide to Jazz Recordings	4/4 stars

In 2005, The Gazette wrote that, "with American trombone giant Roswell Rudd, whose wizardry connects New Orleans with the 'new thing', the two play elastic lines as if one."

The AllMusic review by Brian Olewnick stated: "Recordings like this one are fine introductions to this underappreciated trumpeter's work."

DownBeat reviewer Douglas Clark wrote, "Given the somewhat sketchy nature of the compositions, it is clearly the solos—open and expressive statements—that make this release worthwhile".

== Track listing ==
All compositions by Enrico Rava except as indicated

1. "Lavori Casalinghi" (Enrico Rava, Graciela Rava) – 14:48
2. "Fearless Five" – 4:42
3. "Tramps" – 15:29
4. "'Round About Midnight" (Thelonious Monk) – 3:47
5. "Blackmail" – 3:22

== Personnel ==
- Enrico Rava – trumpet
- Roswell Rudd – trombone
- Jean-François Jenny-Clark – bass
- Aldo Romano – drums
