= Easy Living (Enrico Rava album) =

Studio album by Enrico Rava
- Released: 2004
- Recorded: June 2003
- Studio: Artesuono Recording Studio; Udine, Italy
- Genre: Jazz
- Length: 54:44
- Label: ECM; ECM 1760
- Producer: Manfred Eicher

Enrico Rava chronology
Full of Life (2003)	Easy Living (2004)	Enrico Rava Plays Miles Davis (2004)

Easy Living is an album by Italian jazz trumpeter and composer Enrico Rava recorded in June 2003 and released on ECM the following year. The quintet features trombonist Gianluca Petrella and rhythm section Stefano Bollani, Rosario Bonaccorso and Roberto Gatto.

== Reception ==
The AllMusic review by Thom Jurek awarded the album 4½ stars stating, "Easy Living is a relaxed, low-key affair that is nonetheless fully engaged and deceptive in its pastoral appearance... for all of its warmth and beauty, for all of its free-flowing interplay between the front line and the shimmering rhythms, this is as adventurous and poetic as jazz can be in the new century."

Professional ratings
Review scores
Source	Rating
AllMusic	4.5/5 stars
The Penguin Guide to Jazz Recordings	4/4 stars

== Track listing ==
All tracks are written by Enrico Rava, except as noted.

No.	Title	Writer(s)	Length
1.	"Cromosomi"		8:26
2.	"Drops"		2:28
3.	"Sand"		9:18
4.	"Easy Living"	Ralph Rainger; Leo Robin	4:14
5.	"Algir Dalbughi"		6:36
6.	"Blancasnow"		2:35
7.	"Traveling Night"		7:12
8.	"Hornette and the Drums Thing"		7:10
9.	"Rain"		6:46

== Personnel ==
- Enrico Rava – trumpet
- Gianluca Petrella – trombone
- Stefano Bollani – piano
- Rosario Bonaccorso – bass
- Roberto Gatto – drums
