= Rava on the Dance Floor =

Live album by Enrico Rava and Parco della Musica Jazz Lab
- Released: August 24, 2012
- Recorded: May and November 2011 at Auditorium Parco della Musica, Rome
- Genre: Jazz
- Length: 56:19
- Label: ECM
- Producer: Manfred Eicher

Enrico Rava chronology
Tribe (2010)	Rava on the Dance Floor (2012)	Wild Dance (2015)

Rava on the Dance Floor is a live album by Italian jazz trumpeter and composer Enrico Rava with Parco della Musica Jazz Lab, performing songs by Michael Jackson. It was recorded in Italy in 2011 and released on the ECM label.

== Reception ==
Professional ratings
Review scores
Source	Rating
AllMusic	3.5/5 stars
The Guardian	3/5 stars
All About Jazz	4/5 stars
Austin Chronicle	4/5 stars

The AllMusic review by Thom Jurek awarded the album 3½ stars, stating: "On the Dance Floor doesn't come off as one of Rava's more disciplined recordings—it may indeed be his loosest—but that's by design. It's a laid-back, accessible tribute recording that celebrates Jackson's music as an achievement, and offers jazz fans of all stripes a way into it."

Writing in The Guardian, John Fordham said: "It sounds like a laid-back jazz group having a party, not a Quincy Jones band nailing every hit, but it's a real tribute, not a lament for lost youth."

The All About Jazz review by John Kelman said that "with Rava on the Dance Floor, the trumpeter and Parco della Musica Jazz Lab manage to retain unmistakable reverence for Jackson's music, even as they take it to places the King of Pop could never have envisaged".

== Track listing ==
All compositions by Michael Jackson except as indicated

1. "Speechless" – 6:37
2. "They Don't Care About Us" – 7:54
3. "Thriller" (Rod Temperton) – 6:17
4. "Privacy" (Bernard Belle, LaShawn Daniels, Michael Jackson, Fred Jerkins III, Rodney Jerkins) – 5:43
5. "Smile" (Charlie Chaplin) – 3:29
6. "I Just Can't Stop Loving You/Smooth Criminal" – 9:13
7. "Little Susie" – 3:53
8. "Blood on the Dance Floor" (Michael Jackson, Teddy Riley) – 5:05
9. "History" (James Harris III, Michael Jackson, Terry Lewis) – 8:08

== Personnel ==
- Enrico Rava – trumpet
- Andrea Tofanelli, Claudio Corvini – trumpet, flugelhorn
- Mauro Ottolini – trombone, tuba
- Daniele Tittarelli – alto saxophone, flute
- Dan Kinzelman – tenor saxophone, clarinet, bass clarinet
- Franz Bazzani – keyboard
- Giovanni Guidi – piano, Fender Rhodes, toy piano
- Dario Deidda – bass
- Marcello Giannini – electric guitar
- Zeno de Rossi – drums
- Ernesto Lopez Maturell – percussion
