= New York Days =

Studio album by Enrico Rava
- Released: 24 January 2009
- Recorded: February 2008
- Studio: Avatar (New York, New York)
- Genre: Jazz
- Length: 77:40
- Label: ECM; ECM 2064
- Producer: Manfred Eicher

Enrico Rava chronology
The Third Man (2007)	New York Days (2009)	Tribe (2010)

New York Days is an album by jazz trumpeter and composer Enrico Rava recorded in February 2008 and released on ECM the following year.

== Reception ==
The AllMusic review awarded the album 3½ stars.

Professional ratings
Review scores
Source	Rating
Allmusic	3.5/5 stars

== Track listing ==
All compositions by Enrico Rava except as indicated

1. "Lulù" – 9:33
2. "Improvisation I" (Stefano Bollani, Larry Grenadier, Paul Motian, Enrico Rava, Mark Turner) – 4:24
3. "Outsider" – 6:17
4. "Certi Angoli Segreti" – 10:55
5. "Interiors" – 10:42
6. "Thank You, Come Again" – 7:05
7. "Count Dracula" – 3:20
8. "Luna Urbana" – 7:39
9. "Improvisation II" (Bollani, Grenadier, Motian, Rava, Turner) – 7:52
10. "Lady Orlando" – 5:31
11. "Blancasnow" – 4:22

== Personnel ==
- Enrico Rava – trumpet
- Mark Turner – tenor saxophone
- Stefano Bollani – piano
- Larry Grenadier – bass
- Paul Motian – drums
