= The Plot (album) =

- Original LP cover

Studio album by Enrico Rava
- Released: 1977
- Recorded: August 1976
- Studio: Talent Studio; Oslo, Norway
- Genre: Jazz
- Length: 45:19
- Label: ECM 1078 ST
- Producer: Manfred Eicher

Enrico Rava chronology
The Pilgrim and the Stars (1975)	The Plot (1977)	Enrico Rava Quartet (1978)

Alternative cover
- CD Reissue

The Plot is an album by Italian jazz trumpeter and composer Enrico Rava recorded in August 1976 and released on ECM the following year. The quartet features rhythm section John Abercrombie, Palle Danielsson and Jon Christensen.

== Reception ==
The AllMusic review by Michael G. Nastos awarded the album 4 stars noting the album's "Original ideas and compositions."

Professional ratings
Review scores
Source	Rating
AllMusic	4/5 stars
The Penguin Guide to Jazz Recordings	3.5/4 stars

== Track listing ==
All tracks are written by Enrico Rava except as indicated

Side I
No.	Title	Writer(s)	Length
1.	"Tribe"		6:51
2.	"On the Red Side of the Street"	Enrico Rava; Graciela Rava	5:22
3.	"Amici"		9:04
Total length:			21:17

Side II
No.	Title	Writer(s)	Length
1.	"Dr. Ra and Mr. Va"		6:40
2.	"Foto di famiglia"	John Abercrombie; Enrico Rava	2:22
3.	"The Plot"		15:00
Total length:			24:02 45:19

== Personnel ==
- Enrico Rava – trumpet
- John Abercrombie – electric guitar, acoustic guitar
- Palle Danielsson – bass
- Jon Christensen – drums
