= Patti Wicks =

American singer

- Born: Patricia Ellen Chappell; February 24, 1945; Islip, New York, U.S.
- Died: March 7, 2014 (aged 69) West Palm Beach, Florida
- Genres: Jazz
- Occupation: Singer
- Instrument: Piano
- Years active: 1972–2009
- Label: Maxjazz

Patti Wicks (born Patricia Ellen Chappell; February 24, 1945 – March 7, 2014) was an American jazz singer and pianist.

== Early life ==
Wicks began playing the piano at the age of three and later attended the Crane School of Music at the State University of New York at Potsdam.

== Career ==
Influenced by Bill Evans, she began to perform professionally and moved to New York City, where she played in small ensembles. She also directed her own trio, featuring bassists such as Sam Jones, Richard Davis, Brian Torff, and Mark Dresser, and drummers Curtis Boyd, Louis Hayes, Mickey Roker, and Alan Dawson. In the 1970s, she moved to Florida, where she worked as a musician with, among others, Clark Terry, Larry Coryell, Frank Morgan, Ira Sullivan, Flip Phillips, Anita O'Day, Rebecca Parris, Roseanna Vitro and Giacomo Gates. In addition, she taught jazz piano at colleges and gave private lessons. In 1997, she released her debut album Room at the Top: The Patti Wicks Trio. She was a guest on Marian McPartland's NPR program Piano Jazz. According to Allmusic, she sang in the tradition of Jeri Southern, Nina Simone and Shirley Horn.

== Discography ==
- Room at the Top (Recycle Notes, 1997)
- Love Locked Out (Maxjazz, 2003)
- Basic Feeling (Egea, 2005)
- Italian Sessions (Studiottanta Fortuna, 2007)
- It's a Good Day (Geco Tonwaren, 2008)
- Dedicated To (Greco Records, 2009)
