= Flavio Boltro =

Italian trumpet and flugelhorn jazz player (born 1961)

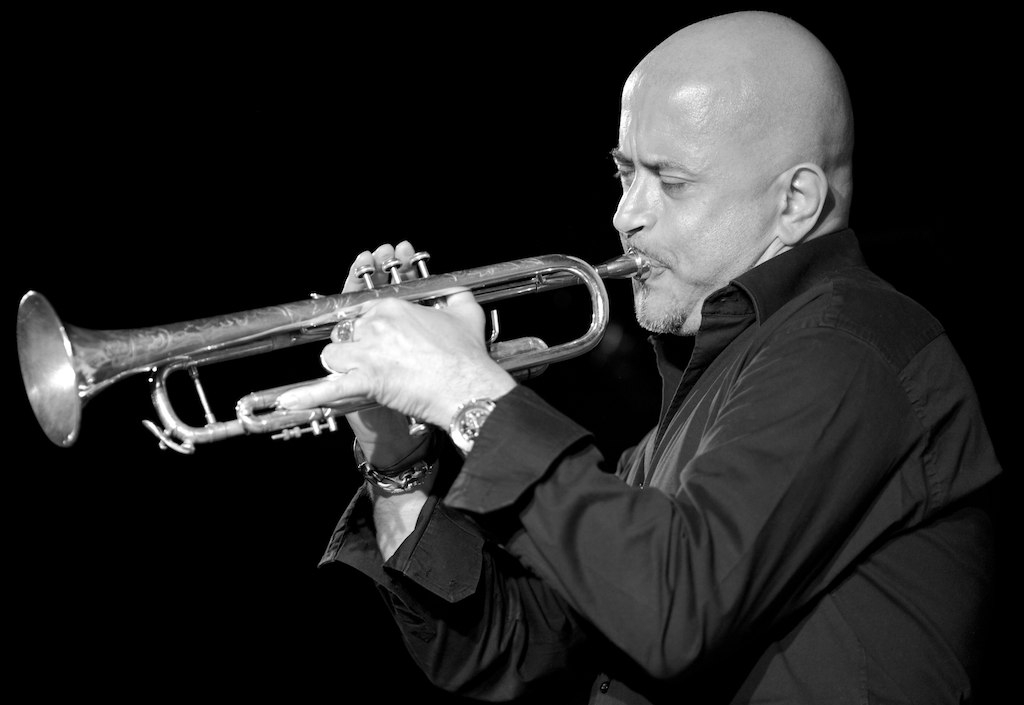
- Flavio Boltro (2010)

Background information
- Born: 5 May 1961 (age 65); Turin, Italy
- Genres: Jazz
- Occupations: Musician, composer
- Instruments: Trumpet, flugelhorn
- Labels: ACT, Blue Note

Flavio Boltro (born 5 May 1961) is an Italian trumpet and flugelhorn jazz player.

== Career ==
Flavio Boltro started playing trumpet at age nine and then entered the Turin school of Classical Music "G.Verdi". During his seven years at the school, he studied classical trumpet, especially with Carlo Arfinengo, trumpet player of Turin's Symphonic Orchestra

From 1982 to 1985, he played regularly with Turin's Symphonic Orchestra and the RAI Symphonic Orchestra (Italian TV network). He began these first jazz gigs with Steve Grossman, Cedar Walton and Billy Higgins in several clubs and major festivals. From 1984 to 1986, he participated in the "Lingomania Quintet" of Maurizio Giammarco, with Roberto Gatto on drums, Furio Di Castri on bass, Maurizio Giammarco on sax and Umberto Fiorentino on guitar (Reverberi CD). In 1986, the Italian newspaper " Musica Jazz" gave him the award of "Best musician" of the year. From this time, he played with legendary musicians as Freddie Hubbard, Clifford Jordan, Jimmy Cobb, Bob Berg, Dave Liebman, Don Cherry. In 1987 another jazz band is decisive in his musical career : the original trio with Manu Roche on drums and Furio Di Castri on bass which is converted in quartet with the venue of Joe Lovano (Imagine CD). In 1992, he released his first album as a leader: Flabula.

In 1994, Boltro and his friend Stefano di Battista (saxophonist) entered the French Orchestre National de Jazz conducted by Laurent Cugny. From 1996 to 2000, Michel Petrucciani engaged Boltro in his sextet. In 1997, Boltro participated at the quintet Di Battista/Boltro with Eric Legnini on piano, Benjamin Henocq on drums and Rosario Bonaccorso on bass.

In 2000, he entered the quintet of the avant-gardist Michel Portal up to 2005. He also played with Laurent de Wilde. He released two CDs as a leader via Blue Note Records (EMI): Road Runner in 1999 and 40 degrés in 2003. Also in 2003, he participated at TRIO AIR with Giovanni Mirabassi on piano and Glen Ferris on trombone. Their album won the 2003 Album of the Year from the French Académie du Jazz.

From 2005 to 2009, he played in Italian saxophonist Rosario Giuliani's quintet including their album, Anything Else (Dreyfus). Since 2007, he played aside Italian singer Gino Paoli's band. They released Milestones (Blue Note, 2007). A second project Un Incontro in Jazz (Parco della musica, 2011) contains original compositions. In 2008, he created a quartet with Giovanni Mazzarino (piano), Marco Mitchelli (bass) and Francesco Sotgiu (drums).

In 2011, the German label, ACT Music, released Opera at Schloss Elmau, in which Boltro and the Italian pianist Danilo Rea play arias from the Italian Opera. In 2012, Boltro released Joyful with a new quintet : Rosario Giuliani (sax), Pietro Lussu (piano), André Ceccarelli (drums) and Darryl Hall (bass).

== Discography ==
- 1987 – Immagini – Trio Boltro, Dicastri, Roche
- 1987 – Into the Blue – Flavio Boltro quintet (Red Records)
- 1991 – Flabula – Flavio Boltro Trio
- 1999 – Roadrunner – Flavio Boltro quartet (Blue Note Records)
- 2003 – 40° – Flavio Boltro quartet (Blue Note Records)
- 2003 – AIR – Trio Giovanni Mirabassi, Flavio Boltro, Glenn Ferris (Sketch)
- 2005 – Trumpet Legacy – Fabrizio Bosso & Flavio Boltro 5et (Soundhills)
- 2009 – Casa del Jazz di Roma – Flavio Boltro 4et (L'Espresso-La Rebublica)
- 2011 – Opera at Schloss Elmau – Duo Danilo Rea/Flavio Boltro – (Act Music)
- 2012 – Joyful – (Bonsaï Music)
