= Paolo Longo =

Paolo Longo may refer to:

- Paolo Longo (composer) (born 1967), Italian composer and conductor
- Paolo Longo (biathlete) (born 1977), Italian biathlete

== See also ==
- Paolo Longo Borghini (born 1980), Italian cyclist
