= Dado Moroni =

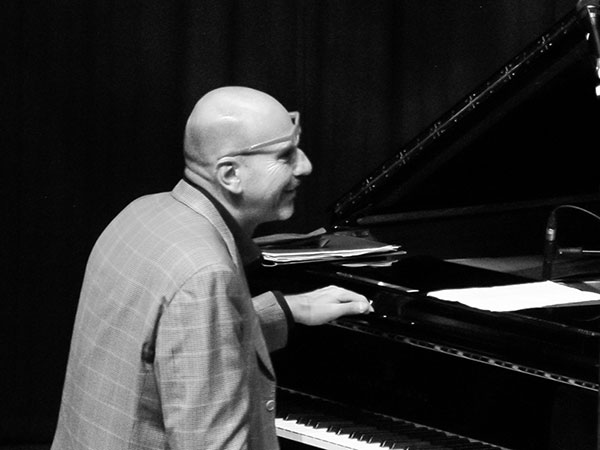
- Dado Moroni 2013

Background information
- Origin: Genoa, Italy
- Genres: Jazz
- Occupation: Musician
- Instrument: Piano

Edgardo "Dado" Moroni (born 20 October 1962) is an Italian jazz pianist and composer.

== Biography ==
Dado was born in Genoa, Italy and started playing piano at age four. A self-taught musician, by his mid-teens he was playing professionally around Italy and by age 17 had recorded his first album.

Throughout the 1980s Dado worked mostly in Europe playing at festivals and in clubs, including a long stint as part of former Duke Ellington bassist Jimmy Woode's trio at Widder Bar in Zurich. Dado moved to the U.S. in 1991, becoming part of the New York jazz scene, and appearing regularly both as a leader and sideman, in some of the city's most prestigious clubs, including Blue Note, Birdland, Village Vanguard as well as recording several CDs.

During his 35-year career Dado has played with legends including Freddie Hubbard, Clark Terry, Zoot Sims, Harry "Sweets" Edison, Ray Brown, Ron Carter, Oscar Peterson, Ahmad Jamal, Hank Jones, Niels-Henning Ørsted Pedersen and Alvin Queen. A highly respected musician, at age 25 he was granted the honor of serving as a juror at the prestigious Thelonious Monk International Piano Competition in 1987.

Based in Italy, Dado continues to perform worldwide. In 2007 he won the Italian Jazz Awards as Best Jazz Act. In 2009 Dado was named Best Italian Jazz Pianist in the Top Jazz referendum sponsored by Musica Jazz magazine. In 2010 he was appointed Professor of Jazz Piano at Giuseppe Verdi Conservatory of Music in Turin, a position he currently holds.

Dado is married to Ada Toure.

== Discography ==
=== As leader ===
- Jazz Piano (Dire, 1980)
- Bluesology (Dire, 1981)
- Sound Sound Sound (Dire, 1987)
- Insights (Jazz Focus, 1995)
- Out of the Night (Jazz Focus, 1999)
- Jazz Im Gartnerplatz (Chaos, 2001)
- Super Star Triok with Moriconi & Bagnol (Abeat, 2002)
- Live Conversations with Enrico Pieranunzi (Abeat, 2006)
- Heart of the Swing (Music Center, 2006)
- Jazzitaliano Live (Casa Del Jazz, 2006)
- The Cube (Abeat, 2008)
- Solo Dado (Abeat, 2009)
- Live in Beverly Hills (Resonance Records. 2011)
- Quiet Yesterday (Abeat, 2012)
- Five for John (Via Veneto, 2014)
- Kind of Bill with Eddie Gomez, Joe La Barbera (BFM, 2017)

=== As sideman ===
With Franco Ambrosetti

- Grazie Italia (Enja, 2000)
- European Legacy (Enja, 2003)
- After the Rain (Enja, 2015)
- Cheers (Enja, 2017)

With Clark Terry

- Take Double (Philips, 1986)
- What a Wonderful World (Red Baron, 1993)
- The Good Things in Life (Red Baron, 1994)
- Remember the Time (Red Baron, 1995)

With others

- Ray Brown, Two Bass Hits (European Music, 1988)
- Ray Brown, Some of My Best Friends Are...The Piano Players (Telarc, 1995)
- Ron Carter, Ron Carter Presents Dado Moroni (EmArcy, 1987)
- Barbara Casini, Uragano Elis (Via Veneto, 2004)
- Franco Cerri, Barber Shop (Abeat, 2014)
- Tiziano Ferro, 111 Centoundici (Capitol, 2003)
- Larry Franco, Introducing...Larry Franco, Jazz Singer! (Philology, 2004)
- Larry Franco, Two in One (Philology, 2007)
- Roberto Gatto, Deep (CAM Jazz, 2003)
- Roberto Gatto, Jazzitaliano Live 2006 (Casa Del Jazz, 2006)
- Tom Harrell, Visions (Contemporary, 1991)
- Tom Harrell, Humanity (Abeat, 2007)
- Wolfgang Haffner, I Should Have Known (Jazz4Ever, 1990)
- Wolfgang Haffner, Whatever It Is (Jazz4Ever, 1991)
- Bert Joris, Live (W.E.R.F., 2002)
- Bert Joris, Magone (Dreyfus, 2007)
- Joe Locke, Stepping On Stars (EGEA, 2011)
- Bruno Lauzi, Paolo Conte, Back to Jazz (Dire, 1989)
- Andy McGhee, Dusko Goykovich, A Tribute to Jimmy Woode (Sound Hills, 2005)
- Bob Mintzer, La Vita e Bella (Abeat, 2010)
- Mark Nightingale, What I Wanted to Say (Red Baron, 1994)
- Eros Ramazzotti, E2 (Sony BMG, 2007)
- Bobby Watson, At the Gouvy Festival In The Groove (Challenge, 2000)
