= Blue Dolls =

The Blue Dolls
- Origin: Turin, Italy
- Genres: A cappella, pop, jazz, Close harmony
- Years active: 2005-present
- Label: CDJ
- Members: Daniela Placci; Angelica Dettori; Flavia Barbacetto

The Blue Dolls are a musical trio specializing in Italian 1940s style vocal 'close harmony' music such as Trio Lescano. Members consist, as of September 2017, of Daniela Placci, Angelica Dettori and Flavia Barbacetto.

The group was founded by their pianist Paolo Volante. The Blue Dolls' debut album, "Voilà les Dolls", contains only 6 tracks, 3 Italian songs of Trio Lescano and 3 Andrews Sisters' songs. In February 2007 they issued their second CD, "The Blue Dolls". In October 2011 they issued their third CD, "Mille Lire al Mese".

The Blue Dolls are currently supported by a four-piece jazz swing band named The Blue Dolls Boys.

== Discography ==
=== Albums ===
- "Voilà les Dolls" (2006)
- "The Blue Dolls" (2009)
- "Mille Lire al mese" (2013)
