= Stefano Di Battista =

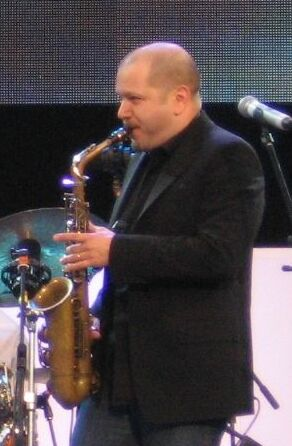

Background information
- Born: 14 February 1969 (age 57); Rome, Italy
- Genre: Jazz
- Occupations: Musician, composer, bandleader
- Instrument: Saxophone
- Labels: Blue Note, Discograph, Just Looking
- Website: www.stefanodibattista.eu

Stefano Di Battista (born 14 February 1969) is an Italian jazz musician who plays soprano and alto saxophone.

== Career ==
Di Battista began playing at thirteen with friends and became interested in jazz after hearing Art Pepper. In Italy he received guidance from Massimo Urbani and by his twenties Di Battista was performing in Paris. He put out his debut as a leader in 1997 and has toured with the Elvin Jones Jazz Machine.

== Discography ==
- Volare (Label Bleu, 1997)
- A Prima Vista (Blue Note, 1998)
- Stefano Di Battista (Blue Note, 2000)
- 'Round About Roma (Blue Note, 2002)
- Parker's Mood (Blue Note, 2004)
- Trouble Shootin' (Blue Note, 2007)
- Più Sole with Nicky Nicolai (EmArcy/Universal, 2009)
- Woman's Land (Alice, 2011)
- Giu' La Testa with Sylvain Luc (Just Looking, 2014)
- La Musica Di Noi (Alice, 2015)
- Italian Standards (Casa del Jazz, 2016)
