= Rita Marcotulli =

Italian jazz pianist and composer (born 1959)

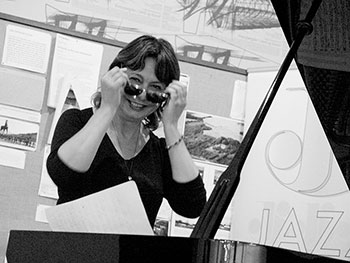

Background information
- Born: 10 March 1959 (age 66); Rome, Italy
- Genres: Jazz
- Occupation(s): Musician, composer
- Instrument: Piano
- Years active: 1980s–present
- Labels: Label Bleu, Le Chant du Monde, Pony Canyon, Egea, Nicolosi

Rita Marcotulli (born 10 March 1959) is an Italian jazz pianist and composer.

== Career ==
Born in Rome, Marcotulli is the daughter of a sound engineer who collaborated with Nino Rota and Ennio Morricone, among others. She started playing piano at five years old and graduated in classical music from the Santa Cecilia Conservatory.

Marcotulli began her professional career in the early 1980s and made her first recording in 1984. Thanks to a series of prestigious collaborations, including Richard Galliano, Chet Baker, Enrico Rava, Kenny Wheeler, Peter Erskine, and Steve Grossman, in a few years she established herself as an important figure in the contemporary jazz scene.

In 1987 Marcotulli was nominated for the Best Young Talent Award in the NPR Music Jazz Critics Poll. In 1988 she toured in the U.S. and in Europe with Billy Cobham, also appearing in Cobham 's album Incoming. In 1996 she duetted with Pat Metheny at the Sanremo Music Festival. She has also had a long-term musical relationship with Dewey Redman.

Marcotulli's style largely relies on improvisation, and her influences include Brazilian music, African music and Indian music.

Also active as a composer of incidental music and musical scores for films, in 2010 Marcotulli won the David di Donatello for Best Score as well as the Ciak d'oro and the Nastro d'Argento in the same category for the score of Rocco Papaleo's Basilicata Coast to Coast.

== Discography ==
- The Woman Next Door (Label Bleu, 1998)
- Triboh (Polo Sud, 2000)
- Koiné (Le Chant du Monde, 2002)
- Oslo Party (Pony Canyon, 2003)
- L' Amico del Vento (Egea, 2005)
- The Light Side of the Moon (Le Chant du Monde, 2006)
- On the Edge of a Perfect Moment (Incipit, 2007)
- Zapping (Egea, 2008)
- Variazioni Su Tema (S'ARD, 2011)
- Basilicata Coast to Coast (Alice, 2011)
- La Conversazione (Abeat, 2013)
- Paolo & Rita (2015)
- TrioKala (Nicolosi, 2016)
- Trio Kala - Indaco hanami (2021)

With Gianmaria Testa

- Lampo (1998)
- Altre Latitudini (Le Chant du Monde, 2003)

With Michel Benita

- Preferences (Label Bleu, 1990)
- Soul (Label Bleu, 1993)

With others

- Nauplia, Maria Pia De Vito (Egea, 1995)
- In London, Dewey Redman (Palmetto, 1998)
- Incoming, Billy Cobham (1989)
