= Enrico Pieranunzi =

Italian jazz pianist

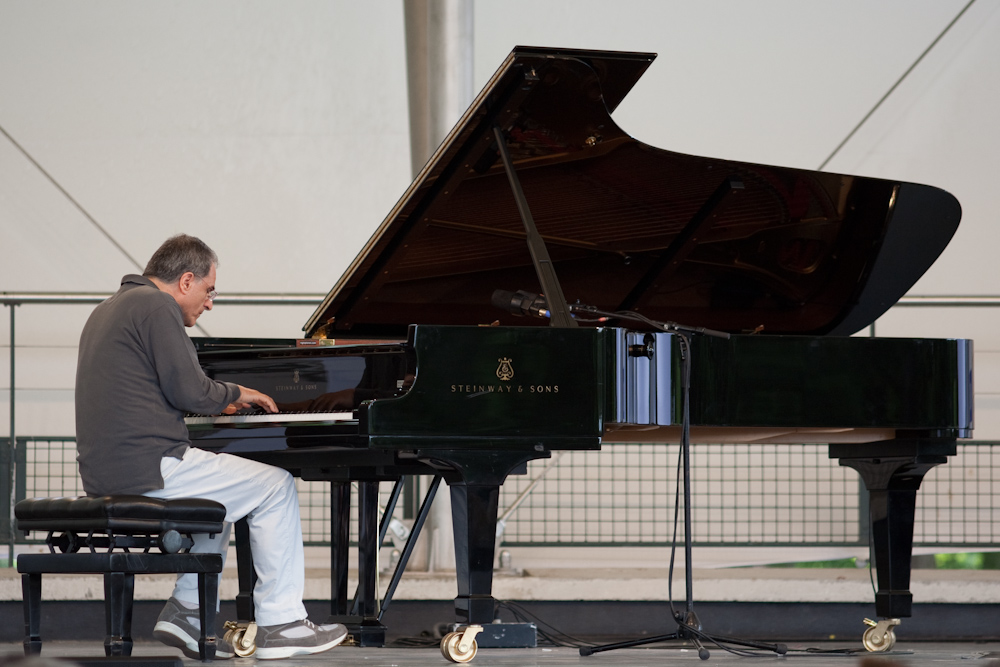
- Pieranunzi in concert, 1 August 2010

Background information
- Born: 5 December 1949 (age 76); Rome, Italy
- Genres: Jazz, classical
- Occupation: Musician
- Instrument: Piano
- Years active: 1975–present
- Labels: Soul Note, Philology, Egea, Challenge, CAM Jazz
- Website: www.enricopieranunzi.it

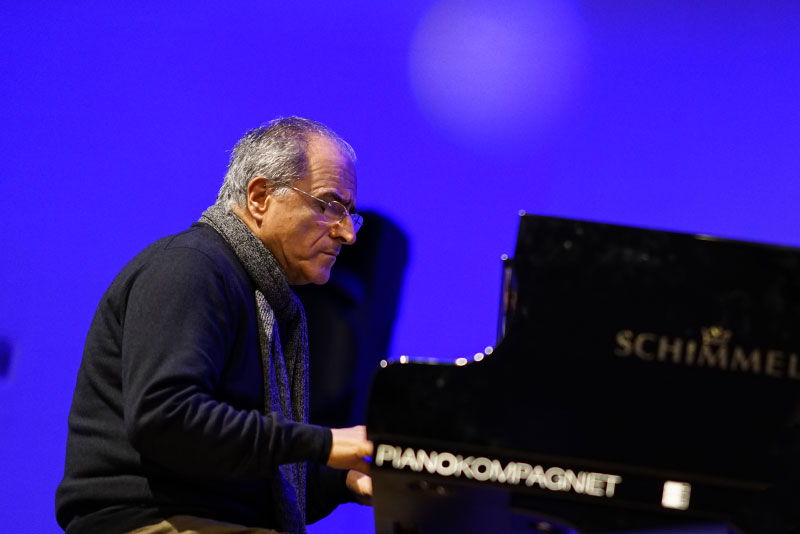
Enrico Pieranunzi (2019) in Denmark

Enrico Pieranunzi (born 5 December 1949) is an Italian jazz pianist. He combines classical technique with jazz.

== Biography ==
The son of Renata Brillantini and Alvaro Pieranunzi, Enrico Pieranunzi was encouraged to study music at a young age. His father was a jazz guitarist. He studied classical music until 1973 when he became a Professor of Music, and remained in the post for two years. In 1975 he left his teaching practice and played in trios and small ensembles. He has recorded over 60 albums and has also been active as a session musician.

Pieranunzi has performed with Frank Rosolino, Sal Nistico, Kenny Clarke, Johnny Griffin, Chet Baker, Joey Baron, Art Farmer, Jim Hall, Marc Johnson, Lee Konitz, Phil Woods, Bill Smith, Charlie Haden, Mads Vinding, Thomas Fonnesbæk, and Billy Higgins. He recorded the first album under his own name in 1975 and has performed with his own group at European and American jazz festivals. He has also composed several film scores.

== Awards and honors ==
- 1982 - Critics award for the Isis album - Soul Note (Enrico Pieranunzi Quartet & Quintet featuring Art Farmer)
- 1983 - Musician of the year Musica Jazz Annual Poll (along with D'Andrea, Rava, Urbani, Trovesi, Gaslini, Bagnoli)
- 1988 - Best Italian Group Musica Jazz Annual Poll (Space Jazz trio)
- 1989 - Musician of the year Musica Jazz Annual Poll, Best Italian Group Musica Jazz Poll (Space Jazz Trio)
- 1995 - Best CD of the Year Music & Discs "Flux & Change - Duo with Paul Motian (Soul Note)
- 1996 - Choc de l'annee of Jazzman for the CD "The Night Gone By"
- 1997 - Django d'Or Best European Musician
- 2002 - Jazz Award "Palazzo Valentini" Province of Rome
- 2003 - Musician of the Year Musica Jazz Annual Poll
- 2005 - Jazz in Europe Award Guinness Jazz Festival (Cork)
- 2008 - Musician of the Year. Musica jazz Annual Poll (along with Franco D'Andrea)
- 2009 - Award of the French Académie du Jazz Francese for the best unpublished (Yellow and Blue Suites, duo with Marc Johnson - Challenge Records)
- 2015 - Top Jazz 2014. A Life for Jazz

== Discography ==
=== As leader/co-leader ===
- Jazz a Confronto 24 (Horo, 1975)
- The Day After the Silence (Edipan, 1976)
- A Long Way (Carosello, 1978)
- From Always...to Now! (Edipan, 1978)
- Soft Journey with Chet Baker (Edipan, 1980)
- Isis (Soul Note, 1981)
- Inconsequence with Ronnie Cuber (Dire, 1983)
- Jazz Roads (CAM Jazz, 1983)
- Autumn Song (Enja, 1985)
- What's What (Demon, 1985)
- Deep Down (Soul Note, 1987) – rec. 1986
- Moon Pie with Enzo Pietropaoli & Roberto Gatto (YVP Music, 1987)
- The Heart of the Ballad with Chet Baker (Philology, 1988)
- ''Solitudes'' with Lee Konitz (Philology, 1988)
- Parisian Portraits (IDA, 1991)
- The Dream Before Us with Marc Johnson (IDA, 1992) – rec. 1990
- In That Dawn of Music (Soul Note, 1993)
- Untold Story (IDA, 1994) – rec.1993
- Flux and Change with Paul Motian (Soul Note, 1995)
- Seaward (Soul Note, 1996) – rec. 1994
- The Night Gone By (Alfa Jazz, 1996)
- The Chant of Time (Alpha Jazz, 1997)
- Ma l'amore no (Soul Note, 1997)
- Un'alba dipinta sui muri (Egea, 1999) – rec. 1998
- Con infinite voci (Egea, 1999) – rec. 1998
- Don't Forget the Poet (Challenge, 1999)
- Daedalus Wings (Challenge, 1999)
- Infant Eyes (Challenge, 2000)
- Improvised Forms for Trio (Challenge, 2000)
- Live in Switzerland (YVP Music, 2000)
- Evans Remembered (Via Veneto, 2001)
- Alone Together (Challenge, 2001)
- Perugia Suite (Egea, 2002) – rec. 1999–2000
- Play Morricone (CAM Jazz, 2002) – rec. 2001
- One Lone Star (YVP Music, 2002)
- Current Conditions (CAM Jazz, 2003) – rec.2001
- Trasnoche with Marc Johnson (Egea, 2003) – rec.2002
- Play Morricone 2 (CAM Jazz, 2004) – rec. 2002
- Les Amants (Egea, 2004)
- Doorways with Paul Motian (CAM Jazz, 2004)
- Special Encounter with Charlie Haden, Paul Motian (CAM Jazz, 2005) – rec. 2003
- Duologues with Jim Hall (CAM Jazz, 2005)
- Live in Paris (Challenge, 2005)
- Ballads (CAM Jazz, 2006) – rec. 2004
- Live Conversations with Dado Moroni (Abeat, 2006)
- Jazzitaliano Live 2006 (Casa del Jazz, 2006)
- Live in Japan (CAM Jazz, 2007)[2CD] – rec. 2004
- Yellow & Blue Suites with Marc Johnson (Challenge, 2008) – rec.1990
- As Never Before (CAM Jazz, 2008) – rec.2004
- Sonatas and Improvisations (CAM Jazz, 2008)
- Dream Dance (CAM Jazz, 2009) – rec.2004
- Wandering (CAM Jazz, 2009)
- Live at Birdland (CAM Jazz, 2010)
- Works and Improvisations (CAM Jazz, 2011)
- New York Reflections (CAM Jazz, 2012)
- Permutation (CAM Jazz, 2012)
- Deep Down (Soul Note, 2012)
- Originals (Jazzit, 2012)
- Live at the Village Vanguard (CAM Jazz, 2013) – rec.2010
- Stories (CAM Jazz, 2014)
- Autour De Martino (TCB, 2014)
- Proximity (CAM Jazz, 2015)
- Tales from the Unexpected (Intuition, 2015)
- Double Circle with Federico Casagrande (CAM Jazz, 2015)
- My Songbook (Via Veneto, 2016)
- Menage a Trois with Andre Ceccarelli (Bonsai Music, 2016)
- European Trio (Casa del Jazz, 2016)
- New Spring (CAM Jazz, 2016)
- Duke's Dream with Rosario Giuliani (Intuition, 2017)
- Play Gershwin with Gabriele Mirabassi, Gabriele Pieranunzi (CAM Jazz, 2018)
- Blue Waltz (Stunt, 2018)
- Monsieur Claude (Bonsai Music, 2018)
- Wine & Waltzes (CAM Jazz, 2018)
- New Visions (Storyville, 2019)
- Frame (CAM Jazz, 2020)
- Common View (Challenge, 2020)

=== As sideman ===
With Riccardo Del Fra

- A Sip of Your Touch (IDA, 1989)
- Chet Visions (Cristal, 2019)

With Charlie Haden

- Silence (Soul Note, 1989)
- First Song (Soul Note, 1992)

With Ennio Morricone

- Cinema Paradiso (DRG, 1988)
- Gli Occhiali D'Oro (Screen Trax, 1996)
- La Gabbia (GDM, 1996)
- Il Bandito Dagli Occhi (Azzurri Beat, 2013)

With Enrico Rava

- Nausicaa (Egea, 1994)
- Bella (Philology, 1994)

With Mads Vinding

- The Kingdom (Stunt, 1997)
- Yesterdays (Stunt, 2017)

With Phil Woods

- Phil's Mood (Philology, 1990)
- Elsa (Philology, 1992)
- Live at the Corridoia Jazz Festival (Philology, 1992)

With others

- Alessandro Alessandroni, Sangue Di Sbirro (Four Flies, 2016)
- Chet Baker, Little Girl Blue (Philology, 1988)
- Brussels Jazz Orchestra & Bert Joris, The Music of Enrico Pieranunzi (W.E.R.F., 2015)
- Bruno Canino, Americas (CAM Jazz, 2016)
- Philip Catherine, Joe Labarbera, Hein Van De Geyn, Concert in Capbreton (Dreyfus, 2010)
- Andre Ceccarelli, Carte Blanche (Dreyfus, 2004)
- Kenny Clarke, Jazz a Confronto 20 (Horo, 1975)
- Anne Ducros, Piano, Piano (Dreyfus, 2005)
- Claudio Fasoli, Hinterland (Edipan, 1979)
- Roberto Gatto, Roberto Gatto Plays Rugantino (CAM Jazz, 2000)
- Terje Gewelt, Oslo (Resonant Music, 2009)
- Lee Konitz, Blew (Philology, 1989)
- Mimmo Locasciulli, Quello Che Ci Resta (RCA, 1977)
- Jesper Lundgaard, 60 Out of Shape (Storyville, 2015)
- Tina May, Home Is Where the Heart Is (33 Jazz, 2015)
- Franco Micalizzi, Laure (Four Flies, 2015)
- Sal Nistico, Jazz a Confronto 16 (Horo, 1975)
- Enzo Pietropaoli, Orange Park (Gala, 1990)
- Gianfranco Plenizio, Liberi Armati (Pericolosi Beat, 2008)
- Frank Rosolino, Jazz a Confronto 4 (Horo, 1973)
- Kenny Wheeler, Charlie Haden, Paul Motian, Fellini Jazz (CAM Jazz, 2003)
- Kai Winding, Duo Bones (Red, 1979)
- Renato Zero, Artide Antartide (Zerolandia, 1981)
