= Enrico Rava =

Italian jazz trumpeter (born 1939)

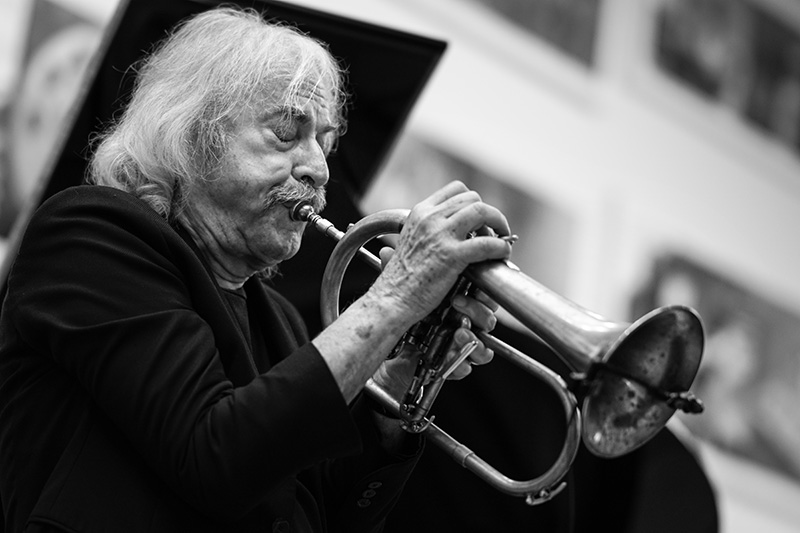
- Rava in Aarhus 2017

Background information
- Born: 20 August 1939 (age 86); Trieste, Italy
- Genres: Avant-garde jazz
- Occupation: Musician
- Instrument: Trumpet
- Years active: 1960s–present
- Labels: Black Saint, ECM, Soul Note, Label Bleu, Philology, CAM Jazz, Duck
- Website: www.enricorava.com

Enrico Rava (born 20 August 1939), is an Italian jazz trumpeter. He started on trombone, then changed to the trumpet after hearing Miles Davis.

== Career ==
He was born in Trieste, Italy.

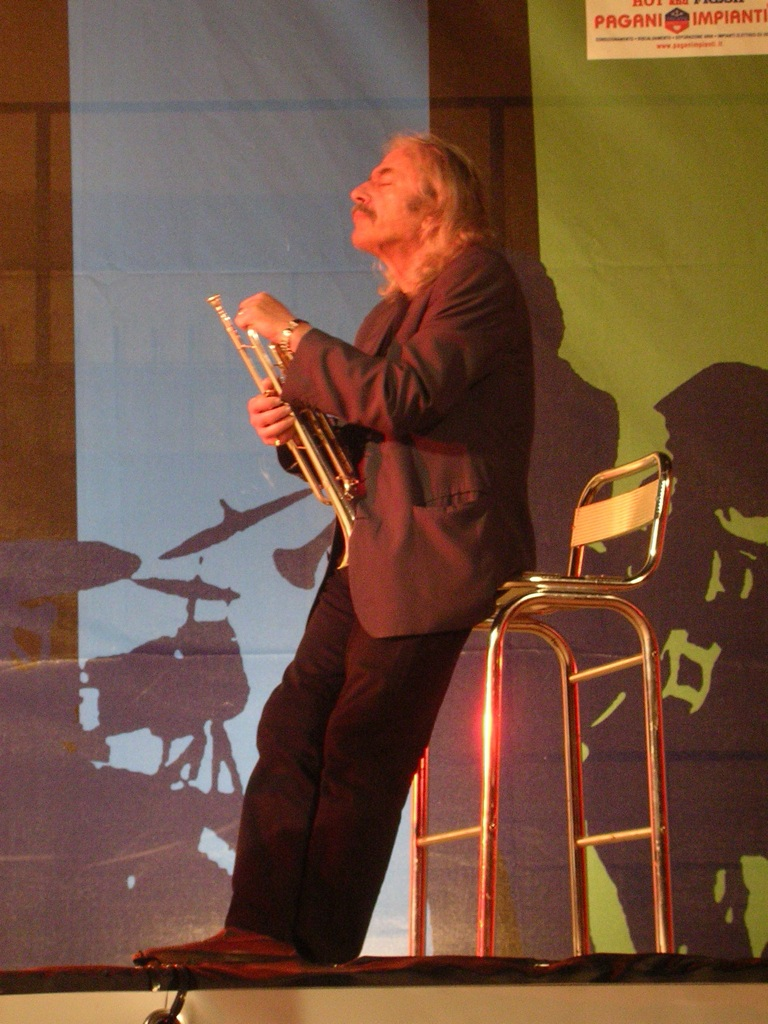
Enrico Rava in 2005

His first commercial work was as a member of Gato Barbieri's Italian quintet in the mid-1960s; in the late 1960s he was a member of Steve Lacy's group. In 1967, Rava moved to New York City and, one month later, became a member of the group Gas Mask, which had one album released on Tonsil Records in 1970.

In the 1970s and 1980s, he worked with John Abercrombie, Andrea Centazzo, Gil Evans, Richard Galliano, Joe Henderson, Joe Lovano, Pat Metheny, Michel Petrucciani, Cecil Taylor, and Miroslav Vitouš. He has also worked with Carla Bley, Lee Konitz, Jeanne Lee, Paul Motian, and Roswell Rudd. Chiefly an exponent of bebop jazz, Rava has also played in avant-garde jazz settings.

With trumpeter Paolo Fresu, Rava recorded four albums on the influence of Bix Beiderbecke, Louis Armstrong, Chet Baker, and Miles Davis. Also of note are his albums Rava, L'Opera Va' and Carmen, which are his interpretations of operatic arias and overtures. In 2001, he founded a quintet with pianist Stefano Bollani and toured with Gato Barbieri and Aldo Romano. In the trio Europeans, he worked with Eberhard Weber and Swiss percussionist Reto Weber.

In June 2005, Rava was awarded an Honorary Doctorate of Music from Berklee College of Music at the twentieth anniversary of jazz education at the Umbria Jazz Festival, in Perugia, Italy.

In 2023, Rava assembled a band of young Italian jazz musicians called The Fearless Five, consisting of Matteo Paggi on trombone, Francesco Ponticelli on double bass, drummer and singer Evita Polidoro, and guitarist Francesco Diodati, and began touring the major European jazz festivals. In July 2024, he released the album Fearless Five with this new band, featuring new versions of some of his most famous songs such as "Lavori Casalinghi" and "The Trial".

== Discography ==
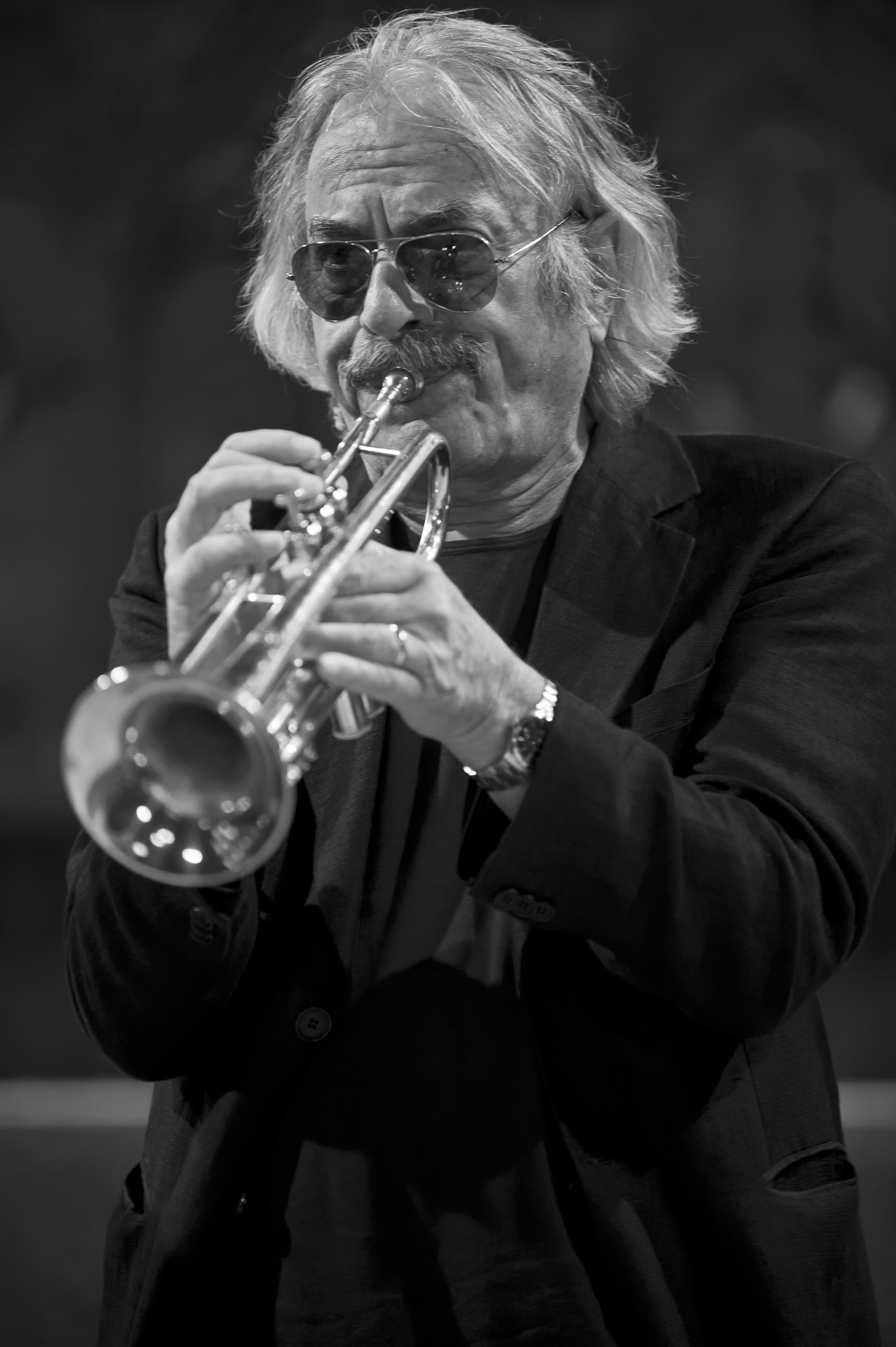

=== As leader/co-leader ===
- Il Giro Del Giorno in 80 Mondi (Black Saint, 1972)
- Katcharpari (MPS/BASF, 1973)
- The Pilgrim and the Stars (ECM, 1975)
- Pupa o Crisalide (RCA, 1975)
- "Quotation Marks" (Japo, 1976)
- The Plot (ECM, 1977)
- Enrico Rava Quartet (ECM, 1978)
- Ah Enrico Rava (ECM 1980)
- Opening Night Enrico Rava Quartet (ECM, 1981)
- Andanada Enrico Rava Quintet (Soul Note, 1983)
- Nexus Meets Enrico Rava (Four Leaf Clover 1984)
- Secrets (Soul Note, 1987)
- Volver with Dino Saluzzi (ECM, 1987)
- Quatre with D'Andrea, Vitous, Humair (Gala, 1989)
- Earthcake with D'Andrea, Vitous, Humair (Gala, 1991)
- Rava L'Opera Va (Label Bleu, 1993)
- Chanson (Gala, 1994)
- Nausicaa with Enrico Pieranunzi (EGEA, 1994)
- Bella with Pieranunzi, Pietropaoli, Gatto (Philology, 1994)
- Carmen (Label Bleu, 1995)
- Electric Five with Gianluigi Trovesi (Soul Note, 1995)
- For Bix and Pops (Philology, 1996)
- Noir (Label Bleu, 1996)
- Italian Ballads (Venus, 1996)
- Icon with Claudio Fasoli, Franco D'Andrea, (Flex, 1998)
- Ragazzi Selvaggi (Ricordi, 1998)
- Certi Angoli Segreti (Label Bleu, 1998)
- Rava Plays Rava (Philology, 1999)
- Duo En Noir with Ran Blake (Between the Lines, 1999)
- Shades of Chet (Via Veneto, 1999)
- Renaissance (Venus, 2002)
- Montreal Diary (Label Bleu, 2002)
- Smiling in Hollywood (GMG Music, 2002)
- What a Day!!! (Platinum, 2002)
- Full of Life (CAM Jazz, 2003)
- Easy Living (ECM, 2004)
- Tati (ECM, 2005)
- Jazzitaliano Live 2006 (Casa Del Jazz, 2006)
- The Words and the Days (ECM, 2007)
- The Third Man (ECM, 2007)
- New York Days (ECM, 2009)
- Jazzitaliano Live 2009 (Casa Del Jazz, 2009)
- Tribe (ECM, 2011)
- Rava on the Dance Floor (ECM, 2012) – live recorded in 2011
- The Monash Sessions (Jazzhead, 2014)
- Wild Dance (ECM, 2015)
- My Songbook (Casa Del Jazz, 2016)
- Roma with Joe Lovano (ECM, 2019)
- Edizione Speziale (ECM, 2021)
- The Song Is You with Fred Hersch (ECM, 2022) – recorded in 2021
- 2 Blues for Cecil with Andrew Cyrille and William Parker (TUM, 2022) – recorded in 2021
- Fearless Five (2024)

=== As member ===
European Jazz Ensemble

- 20th Anniversary Tour (Konnex, 1997)
- At the Philharmonic Cologne (MA Music, 1989)

Globe Unity Orchestra

- Jahrmarkt & Local Fair (Po Torch, 1977)
- Pearls (FMP, 1977)
- Compositions (Japo, 1980)
- Baden-Baden '75 (FMP, 2011)

ICP Orchestra

- Live Soncino ICP Orchestra (ICP/Ad Lib, 1979)

Italian Instabile Orchestra

- Italian Instabile Festival (Leo, 1998)
- Litania Sibilante (Enja, 2000)
- Previsioni Del Tempo = Forecast (Imprint, 2002)

=== As sideman ===
With Gianni Basso

- Blue Woods (Philology, 2002)
- Tea for Two (Philology, 2005)

With Andrea Centazzo

- Live (Ictus, 2002)
- Doctor Faustus (Ictus, 2006)

With Giorgio Gaslini

- Nuovi Sentimenti Suite (La Voce Del Padrone, 1966)
- Message (BASF, 1973)

With Steve Lacy

- Sortie (GTA, 1966)
- The Forest and the Zoo (ESP-Disk, 1967)
- Roba (Saravah, 1972)
- Let's Call This (Hat Art, 1986)

With Roswell Rudd

- Numatik Swing Band (JCOA, 1973)
- Inside Job (Arista/Freedom, 1976)
- Blown Bone (Philips, 1979)

With Bruce Ditmas

- Aeray Dust (Chiaroscuro, 1977)
- Yellow Wizard (Wizard, 1977) – recorded in 1976

With others

- Nicola Arigliano, Go Man! (NuN 2001)
- Barry Altschul, Irina (Soul Note, 1983)
- Franco Ambrosetti, Grazie Italia (Enja, 2000)
- Karl Berger, No Man Is an Island (Douglas Music 1997)
- Carla Bley, Escalator over the Hill (JCOA, 1971)
- Salvatore Bonafede, Journey to Donnafugata (CAM Jazz, 2004)
- Dollar Brand, African Space Program (Enja, 1974)
- Barbara Casini, Vento (Label Bleu, 2000)
- Mario Castelnuovo, Come Sara Mio Figlio (RCA Italiana 1991)
- François Cotinaud, Pyramides (Label Musivi 1992)
- Marc Ducret, Gris (Label Bleu, 1990)
- Ivano Fossati, La Disciplina Della Terra (Columbia, 2000)
- Roberto Gatto, Roberto Gatto Plays Rugantino (CAM Jazz, 2000)
- George Gruntz, Happening Now! (hat ART, 1988)
- Gunter Hampel, Angel (Birth, 1972)
- Matthew Herbert, The State Between Us (Accidental, 2019)
- ICP Orchestra, Live Soncino (Instant Composers Pool, 1979)
- Stafford James, Jazz a Confronto 26 (Horo, 1976)
- Robin Kenyatta, Terra Nova (Atlantic, 1973)
- Lee Konitz, L'Age Mur (Philology, 1998)
- Jimmy Lyons, Give It Up (Black Saint, 1985)
- Rita Marcotulli, The Woman Next Door (Label Bleu, 1998)
- Gas Mask, Their first album (Tonsil, 1970)
- Banda Osiris, L'Imbalsamatore (Radiofandango, 2002)
- Jean-Marc Padovani, Nimeno (Label Bleu, 1991)
- Gianluca Petrella, Il Bidone (Spacebone, 2013)
- Enrico Pieranunzi, Ma L'Amore No (Soul Note, 1997)
- Enzo Pietropaoli, To... (Sentemo, 1992)
- Quatre, Earthcake (Label Bleu, 1991)
- Massimo Ranieri, Malia (Sony, 2015)
- Massimo Ranieri, Malia Parte II (NAR, 2016)
- Aldo Romano, Inner Smile (Dreyfus, 2011)
- Manfred Schoof, European Echoes (FMP, 1969)
- Renato Sellani, A Mina (Philology, 2004)
- Archie Shepp, Little Red Moon (Soul Note, 1986)
- Cecil Taylor, Winged Serpent (Sliding Quadrants) (Soul Note, 1985)
- Cecil Taylor, Alms/Tiergarten (Spree) (FMP, 1989)
- Gianmaria Testa, Altre Latitudinii (Le Chant Du Monde, 2003)
- Gianluigi Trovesi, Jazzitaliano Live 2007 (Casa Del Jazz, 2007)
- Piero Umiliani, Una Bella Grinta (CAM Jazz, 1965)
- Ornella Vanoni, Ti (Columbia/Sony 2004)
- Barney Wilen, Passione (Venus, 1995)
