= Renato Sellani =

Italian musician (1926–2014)

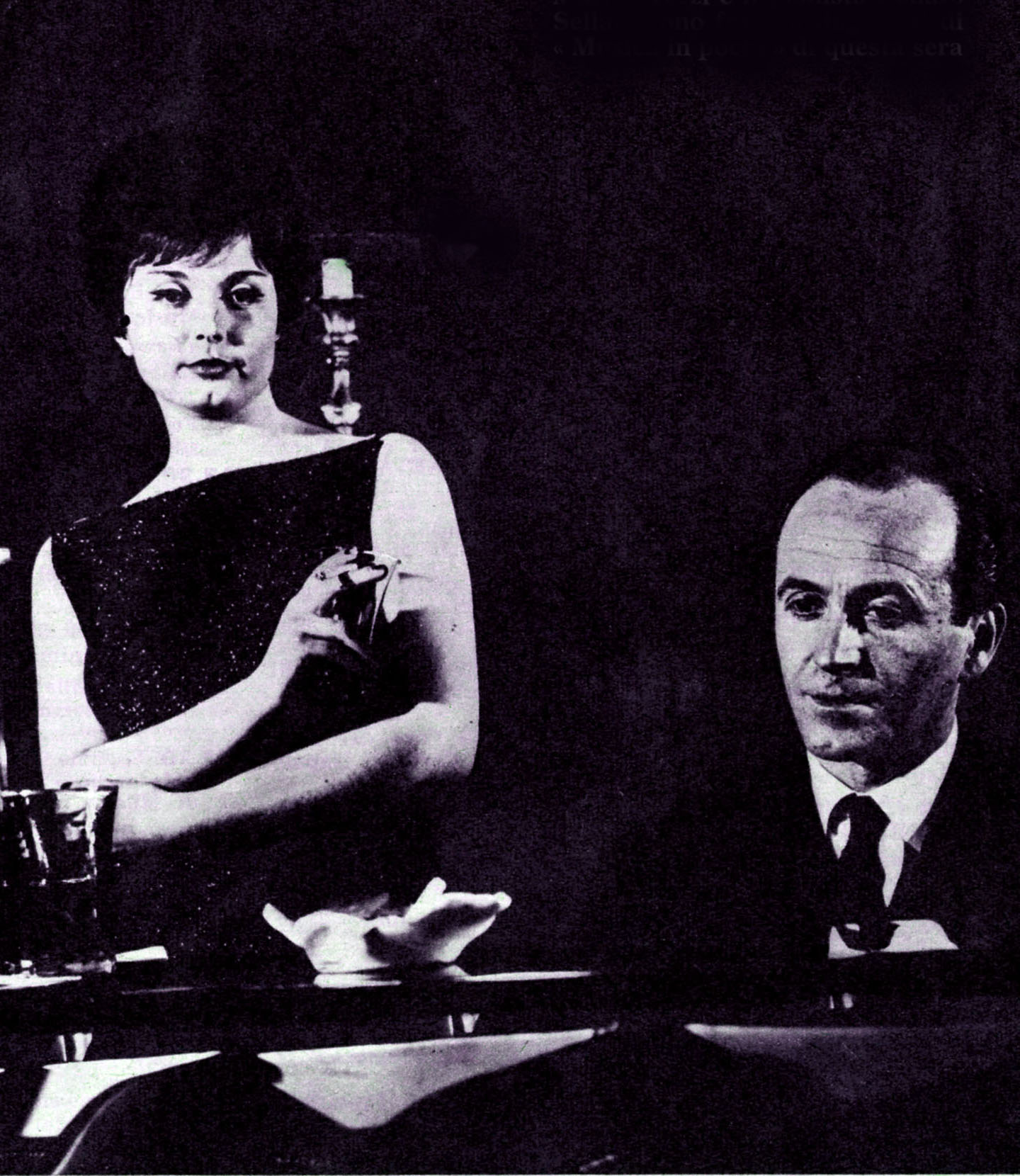
- Sellani with singer Marisa Terzi (1963)

Background information
- Born: 8 January 1926; Senigallia, Province of Ancona
- Died: 31 October 2014 (aged 88) Milan, Italy
- Occupation: Musician
- Instrument: Piano

Renato Sellani (8 January 1926 – 31 October 2014) was an Italian jazz pianist and composer.

== Life and career ==
Born in Senigallia, Sellani started his professional career in 1954, when he entered the Basso-Valdambrini Quintet. In 1958 he started a long collaboration with his longtime friend Franco Cerri. He was part of the RAI National Symphony Orchestra directed by Gorni Kramer. As a pianist, he collaborated with Chet Baker, Billie Holiday, Dizzie Gillespie, Lee Konitz, Bill Coleman, Gerry Mulligan, Enrico Rava and Tony Scott, among others.

Sellani was an incidental music composer for stage plays, and his works include several scores for the Piccolo Teatro in Milan and a long collaboration with the stage company of Tino Buazzelli.
