= Enzo Pietropaoli =

Enzo Pietropaoli (born in 1955) is an Italian jazz bassist.

In 1987 with the group Lingomania; in 1988 and 1989 with Enrico Pieranunzi Space Jazz Trio; and in 1999, 2001 and 2003 with Doctor 3 group (with pianist Danilo Rea and drummer Fabrizio Sferra).

== Discography ==
=== As sideman ===
With Curtis Fuller

- Curtis Fuller Meets Roma Jazz Trio (Timeless, 1984)
