= Barbara Casini =

Italian vocalist and guitar player

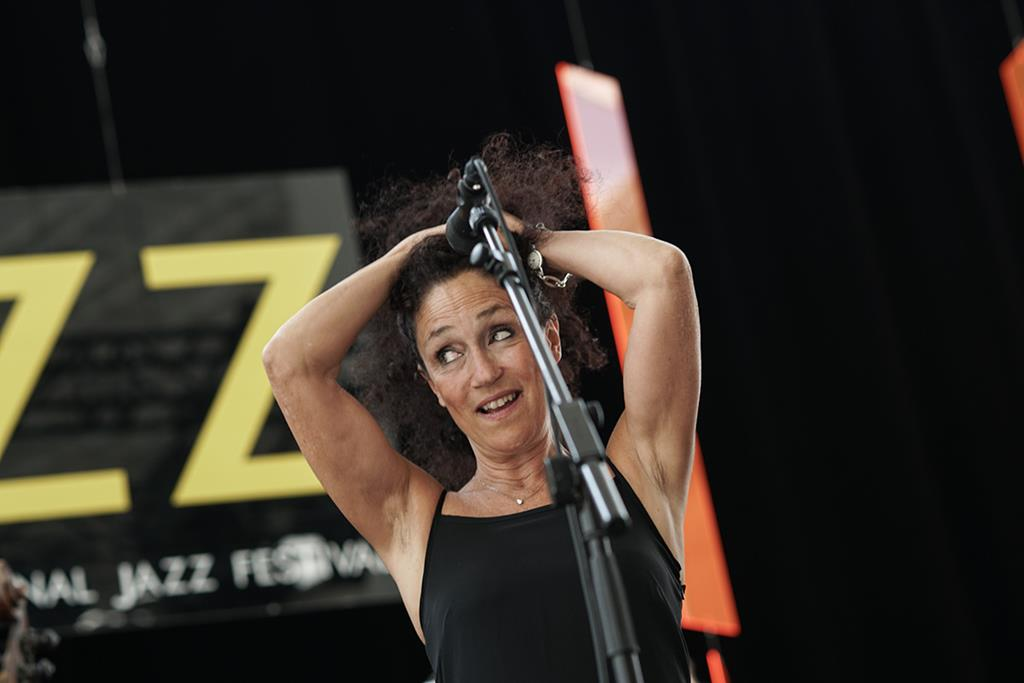
Barbara Casini at Aarhus Jazz Festival, Denmark 2018

Barbara Casini (born 1954 in Florence) is an Italian jazz vocalist and guitarist.

While studying piano, she was exposed to bossa nova at the age of 15, which had a marked influence on her musical life. After graduating with a degree in psychology from the University of Padova, she started performing in 1979.

She has recorded and performed with Lee Konitz, Phil Woods, Leo Walls, Francisco Petreni, Stefano Bollani, and Enrico Rava.

== Discography ==
- 1997 – Todo o Amor
- 1999 – Outro Lado
- 2000 – Vento
- 2000 – Sozinha
- 2001 – Você e Eu
- 2002 – Outra Vez
- 2003 – Uma voz para Caetano
- 2004 – Anos Dourados
- 2004 – Uragano Elis
- 2005 – Luiza
- 2007 – Palavra Prima
- 2007 – Nordestina
- 2009 – Formidable
- 2011 – Barato Total
- 2012 – Agora Ta
- 2015 – Uma Mulher
- 2016 – Terras
