= Massimo Urbani =

Italian musician

Massimo Urbani (8 May 1957 – 24 June 1993) was an Italian jazz alto saxophonist. He played principally in the bebop style.

== Life and career ==
Urbani was born in Primavalle, Rome on 8 May 1957, the oldest of five brothers. His first instrument, from 1968, was the clarinet, but he soon switched to the alto saxophone.

Urbani died of a heroin overdose on 23 June 1993. The Penguin Guide to Jazz commented that "Urbani's senseless death robbed Europe of a player whose records are a flawed testament to a bopper of enormous guts and facility."

== Discography ==
- 1974 Jazz a Confronto 13 (Horo)
- 1977 Invitation (Philology
- 1979 360° Aeutopia (Red)
- 1980 Dedications to A.A. & J.C. – Max's Mood (Red)
- 1981 Go Max Go (Philology)
- 1983 Max Leaps In with Tullio De Piscopo, Mike Melillo, Massimo Moriconi)
- 1984 The Urbisaglia Voncert (Philology)
- 1987 Easy to Love (Red)
- 1987 Duets Improvisations for Yardbird with Mike Melillo (Philology)
- 1988 Urlo (Elicona)
- 1990 Out of Nowhere (Splasc)
- 1991 Round About Max with Strings (Sentemo)
- 1993 The Blessing (Red)
