= Best III =

Best III may refer to:

- Best III (Akina Nakamori album), 1992
- Best III (computer), a Russian ZX Spectrum clone
- The Best III: Fuck the System Jazz, an album by Elektropartizany, 2013
