= Letov =

Letov can refer to:

- Letov Kbely, a Czech (and Czechoslovak) aircraft company
- Yegor Letov (1964–2008), Russian punk rock musician, leader of the band Grazhdanskaya Oborona
- Sergey Letov (born 1956), Russian saxophonist, brother of Yegor Letov
