= Without Kuryokhin =

Live album by Kenny Millions & Otomo Yoshihide
- Released: 1999
- Recorded: Central House of Artist, Moscow, November 5, 1996
- Genre: Noise music, jazz
- Length: 49:26
- Label: Long Arms Records
- Producer: Nick Dmitriev

Without Kuryokhin is a 1999 album by American jazz multi-instrumentalist Kenny Millions and Japanese experimental musician Otomo Yoshihide. It was dedicated to Russian jazz and experimental musician Sergey Kuryokhin. It was recorded live during a Russian mini-tour in 1996 and performed two concerts, one at Moscow, and one at Saint Petersburg.

== Track listing ==
All tracks written by Kenny Millions and Otomo Yoshihide.

1. "Live & Remix 1" - 9:04
2. "Live 1" - 3:31
3. "Live & Remix 2" - 0:53
4. "Live & Remix 3" - 6:03
5. "Live & Remix 4" - 3:57
6. "Live 2" - 21:59
7. "Live & Remix 5" - 3:59

== Personnel ==
- Kenny Millions - saxophone, clarinet, miniature guitar, vocals
- Otomo Yoshihide - turntables, electronics, samplers
