= Alexander Morozov (artist) =

Russian contemporary artist (born 1974)

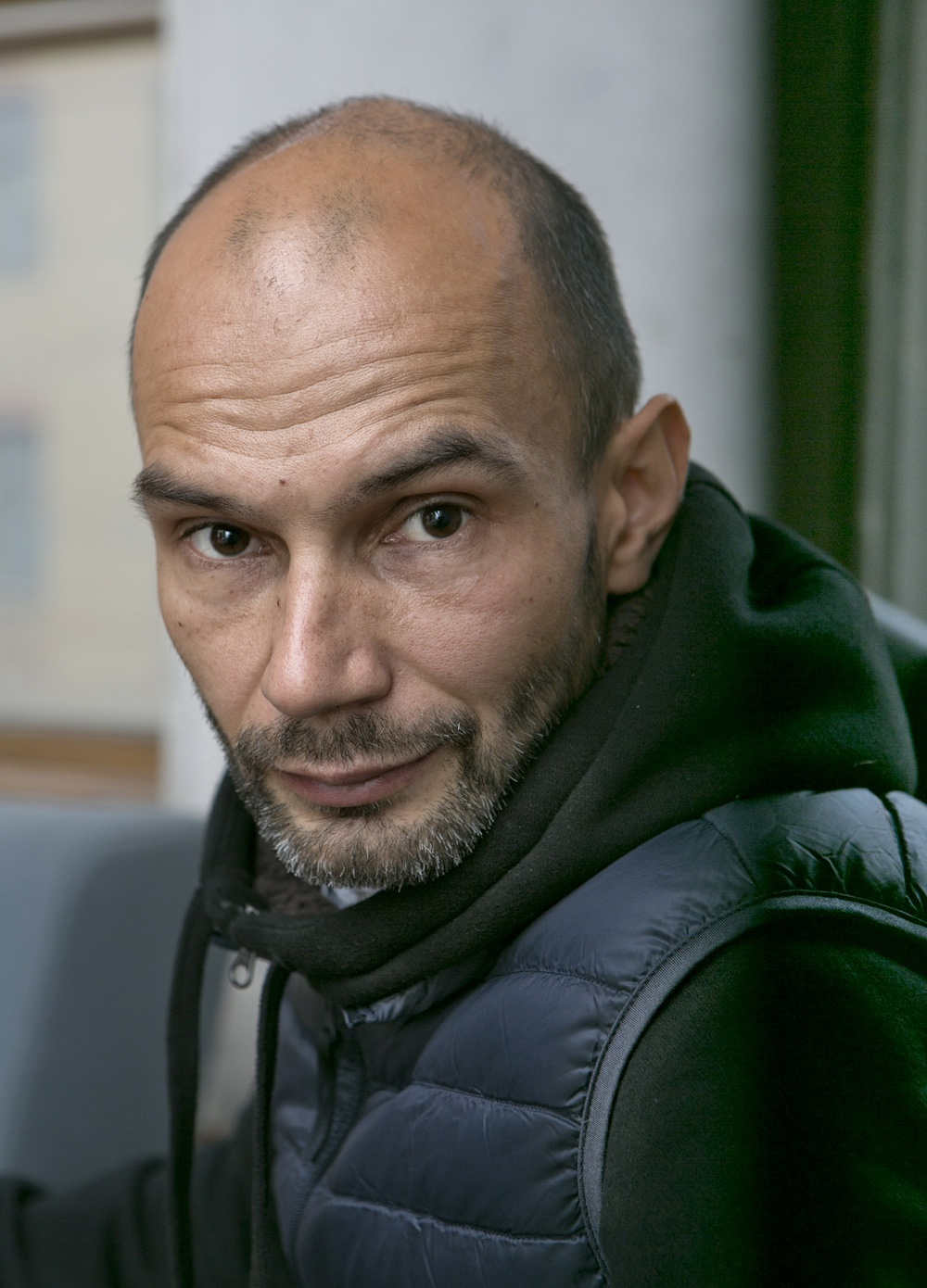
- Portrait of Alexander Morozov
- Born: Alexander Alexandrovich Morozov; 22 March 1974 (age 52); Voroshylovhrad, Ukrainian SSR, Soviet Union
- Education: St. Petersburg State Academic Institute of Fine Arts, Sculpture and Architecture
- Known for: Painting and installation art
- Movement: Contemporary art
- Website: www.sashamorozov.ru

Alexander Alexandrovich Morozov (Russian: Александр Александрович Морозов; born 22 March 1974 in Voroshylovhrad, Ukrainian SSR, Soviet Union) is a contemporary artist. Morozov's artistic practice revolves around the theme of the disappearance of cultural memory, with a focus on recreating lost masterpieces through the reconstruction of artifacts lost during military operations. The main medium used in their work is through the restoration of artworks and artifacts, aiming to establish continuity in memory disrupted by war or catastrophes.

== Life ==
=== Education ===
Morozov attended Luhansk Art College (with an artistic practice in Lviv), Ukraine (1989–1994), the Imperial Academy of Arts in St. Petersburg, Russia, (1996–2002), and an educational program in ProArte Institute ‘Practicum. New Technology in Contemporary Art’ in St. Petersburg (1999–2000).

Morozov is known for the conceptual project Birds’ Flight Records, shown in Russia, Estonia, Latvia, Ukraine, France, Germany. The project documented the timing and trajectories of birds flying in the surrounding landscape. Among his prominent projects are The Black Book and Icons series. The first explored the disappearance of cultural memory, recreating the artifacts lost during the war. The second focused on paintings with everyday subjects made in the egg tempera technique, characteristic of European art in the 15th–17th centuries.

He participated in the 11th Krasnoyarsk Museum Biennale (2015), the 3rd Ural Industrial Biennale of Contemporary Art (2015), the 6th Moscow Biennale of Contemporary Art (2015), and the parallel and public programmes for Manifesta 10, the European Biennale of Contemporary Art (2014, St Petersburg). He was a nominee for the Artaward International Strabag Prize (Austria, 2013), the Sergey Kuryokhin Contemporary Art Award (St Petersburg, 2013), and the 12th Kandinsky Prize with the nomination "Project of the Year" (2019). He won the Sergey Kuryokhin Contemporary Art Award (2018) in the Best Visual Project category. He was a finalist for the 13th Kandinsky Prize with the nomination "Project of the Year" for the project Dystopia Station (2021).

== Selected projects ==
Particularly Slow Air. 2020

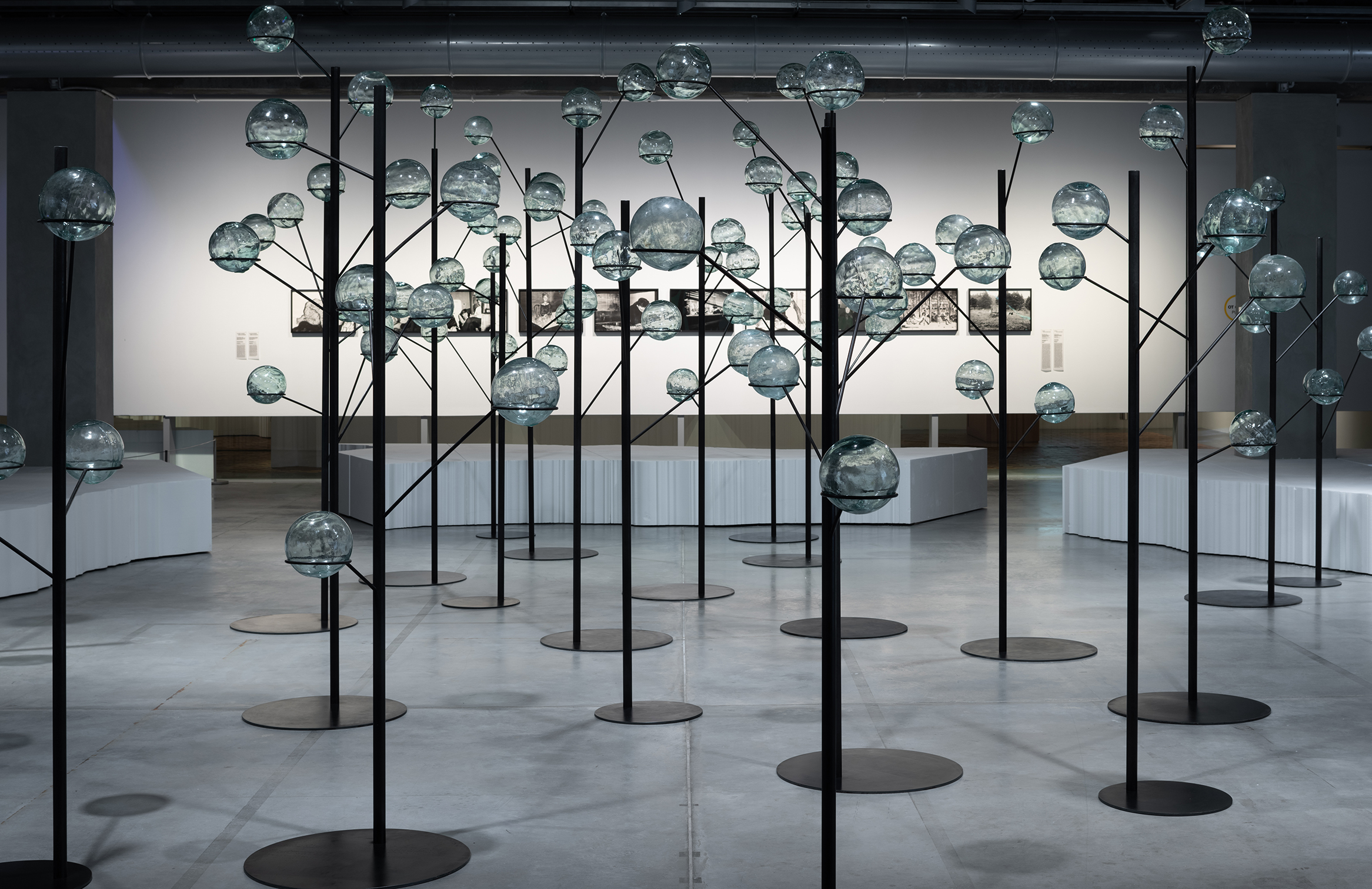
Alexander Morozov. Particularly Slow Air. 2020. Installation. 2nd Garage Triennial of Russian Contemporary Art "A Beautiful Night for All the People"

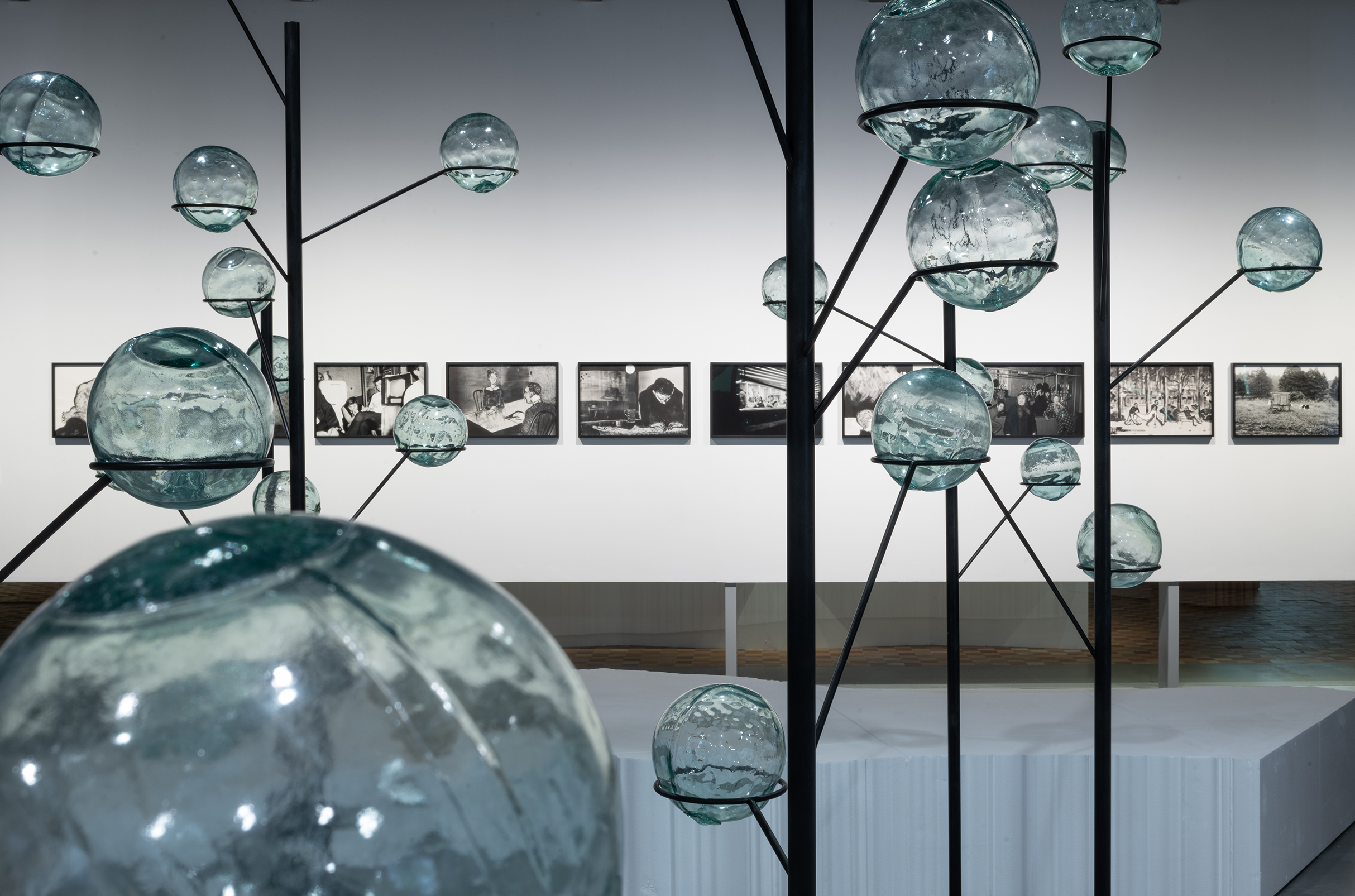
Alexander Morozov. Particularly Slow Air. 2020. Installation. 2nd Garage Triennial of Russian Contemporary Art "A Beautiful Night for All the People"

This work is an exhibition within an exhibition: an installation of the glass floats used by Estonian fishermen to keep their nets afloat. These floats come from the village of Nõmmküla, whose fishermen are famous for catching the biggest fish in Estonia's recent history. The village is located on the island of Muhu, formerly used for Soviet missile bases. During their presence on the island the military forbade the fishermen to go to sea, as this was border territory.

Dystopia Station. 2020

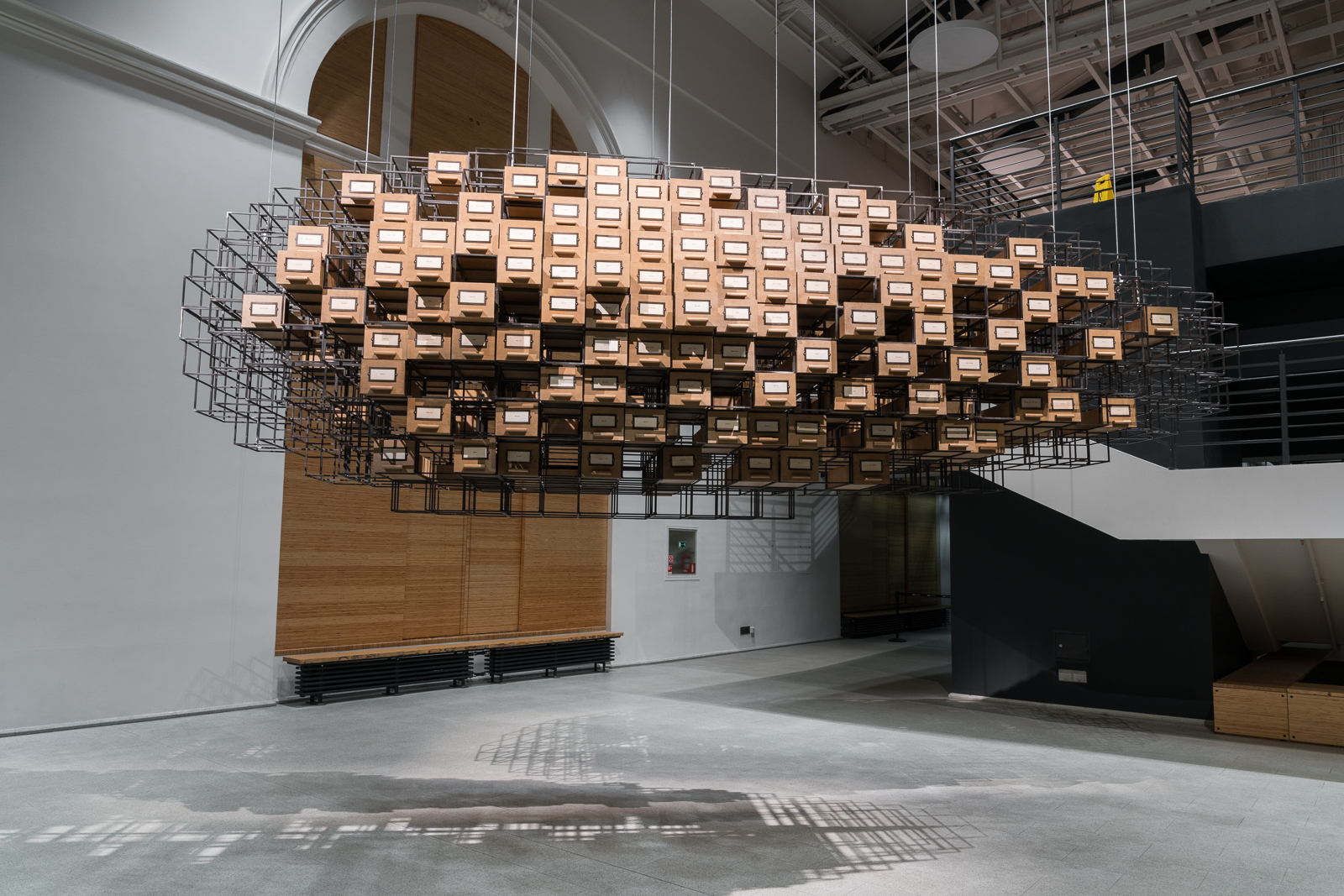
Alexander Morozov. Dystopia Station. 2020. Installation. NEMOSKVA Is Just Around the Corner. Manege Central Exhibition Hall. St. Petersburg

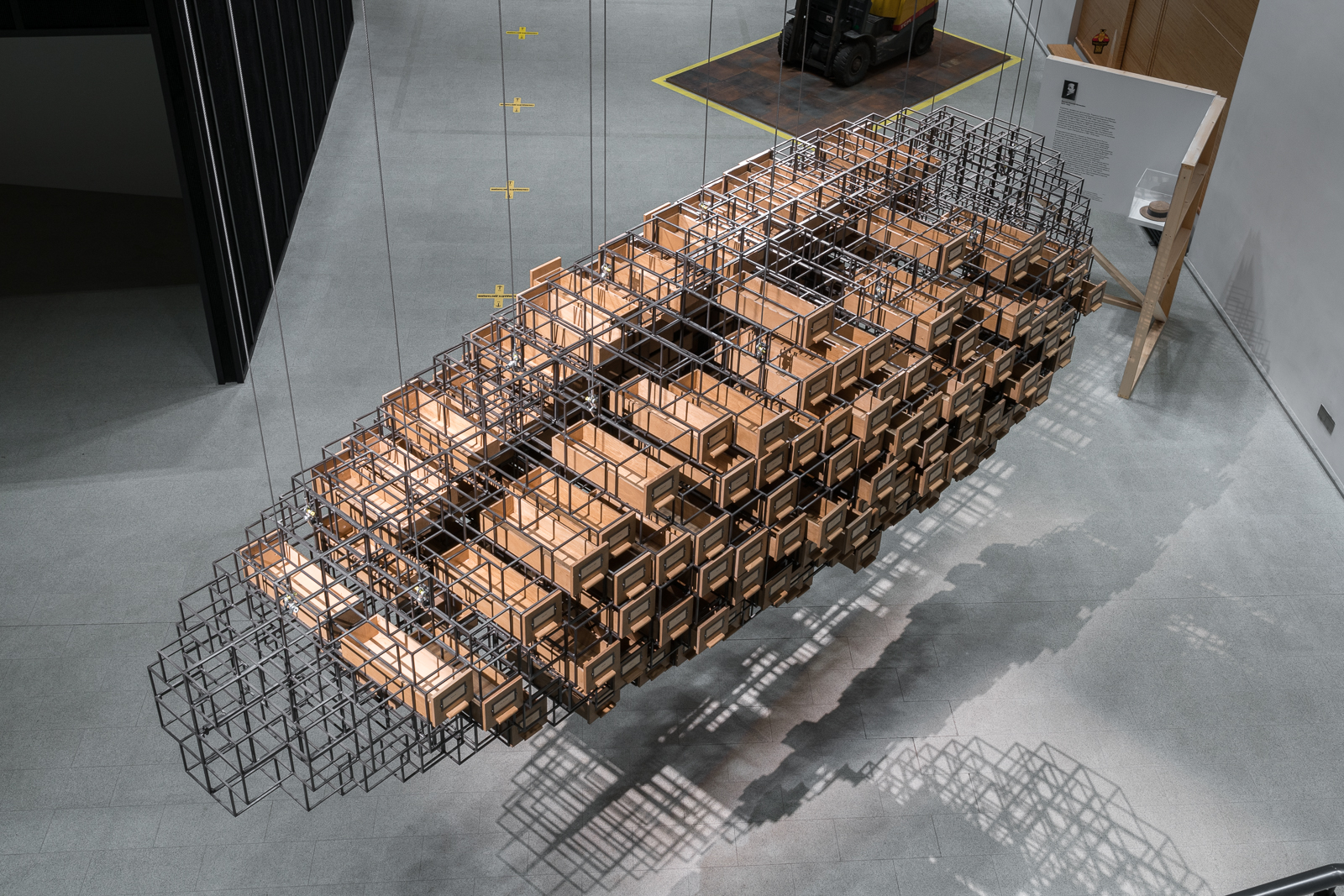
Alexander Morozov. Dystopia Station. 2020. Installation. NEMOSKVA Is Just Around the Corner. Manege Central Exhibition Hall. St. Petersburg

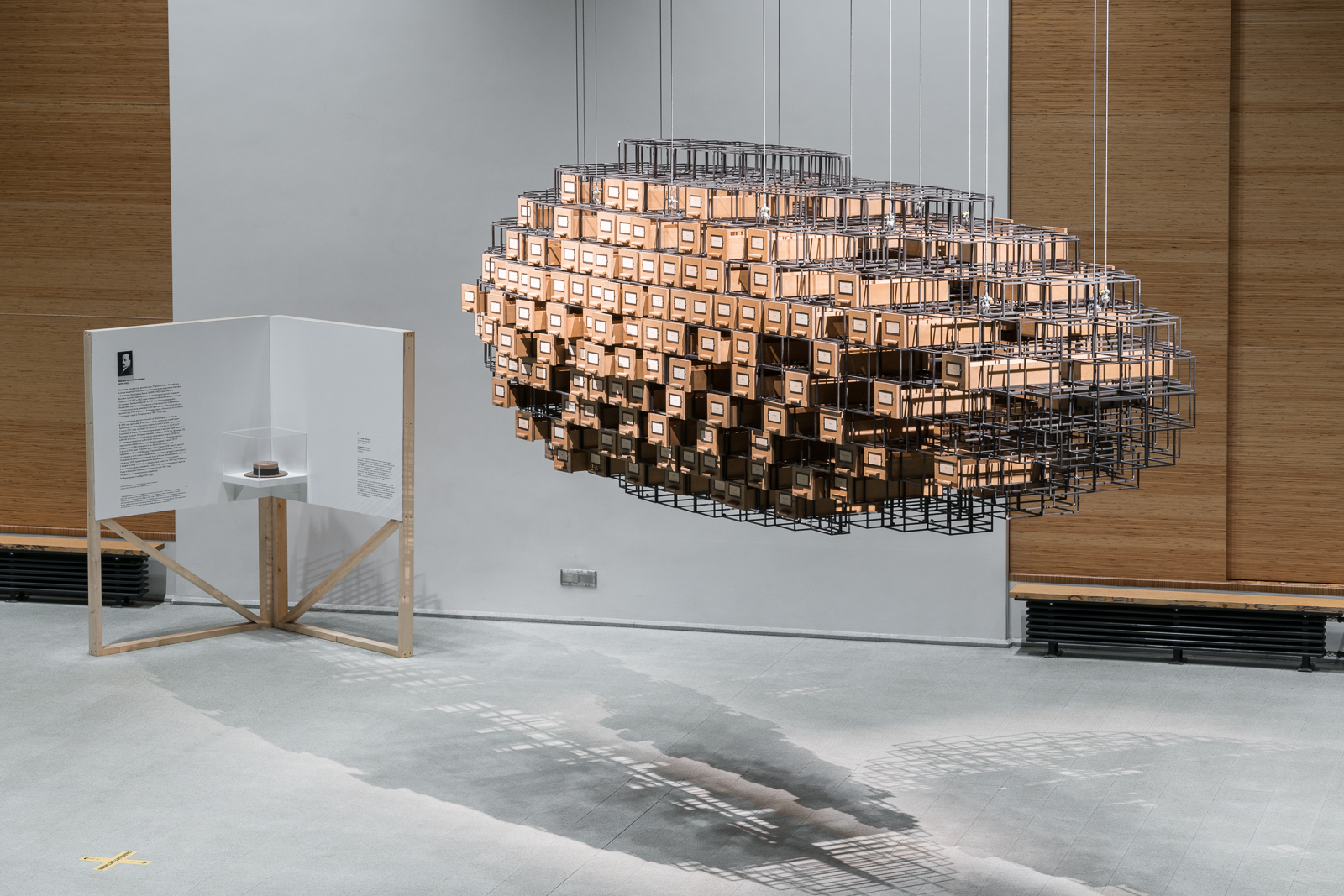
Alexander Morozov. Dystopia Station. 2020. Installation. NEMOSKVA Is Just Around the Corner. Manege Central Exhibition Hall. St. Petersburg

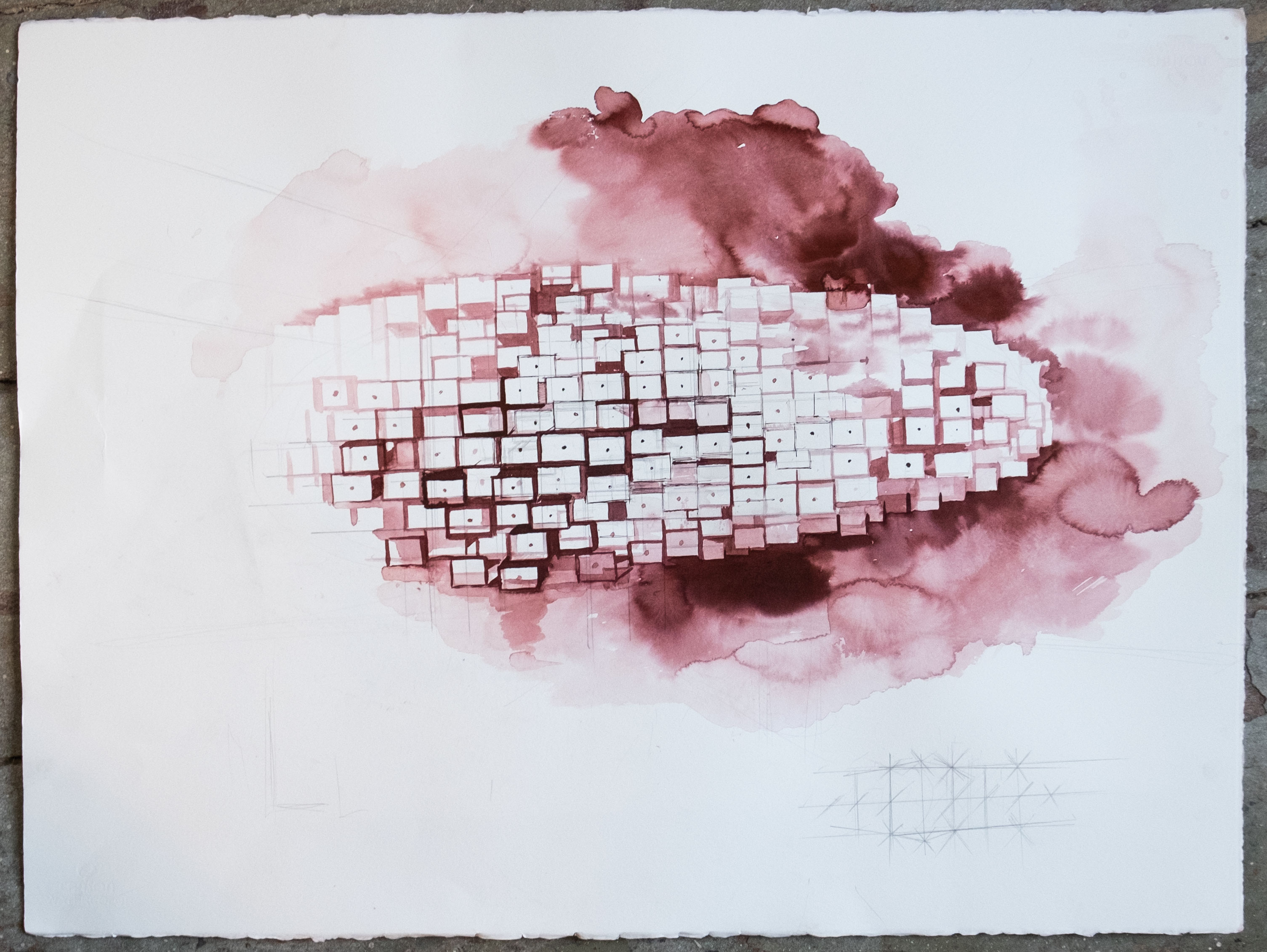
Alexander Morozov. Dystopia Station. 2020. Sketch.

With this piece, the artist explored the theme of memory and its reconstruction. A zeppelin assembled from office drawers is suspended in the Manege exhibition hall, a former garage of the NKVD. The aircraft references both the location and the biography of Nikolay Lanceray, who designed the project to convert the horse guards' riding hall into an OGPU garage while held in a “sharashka”, a special design bureau, from July 1931 to 28 June 1935. The filing drawer functions as a symbol of institutional memory, referencing the archival policies of the period. Personal records of NKVD garage drivers, who were part of the state repression apparatus and later became its subjects, are reported to remain stored in similar drawers.

== Solo exhibitions ==
- 2025 — Lost Memories. In-gate Gallery, Brussels
- 2024 — No sand in the sky. Gallery DiX9 Hélène Lacharmoise, Paris
- 2023 — Diary. Cité Internationale des arts. Paris, France
- 2021 — The rest. КultProject Gallery. Moscow, Russia
- 2019 — Birds Flight Records. Petersburg art space, Berlin
- 2019 — Railway Opera. Russian Railways Museum. St Petersburg
- 2018 — Akchim. coordinates, Perm State Art Gallery, Perm
- 2017 — Simple things, Triumph Gallery, Moscow
- 2015 — Cosa Mentale , Marina Gisich Gallery, St Petersburg
- 2014 — ‘What Do You See?’. Artre.Flex Gallery, St Petersburg
- 2014 — ‘Garden’. Book Graphics Library, St Petersburg
- 2012 — ‘Factum’. Luda Express gallery in ‘New Holland’ open air art space, St Petersburg
- 2012 — ‘The Human Factor’. with Alexander Artemov, Algallery, St Petersburg
- 2012 — ‘Cinderella Effect’. Navicula Artis Gallery, St Petersburg
- 2010 — ‘Radiation’. Navicula Artis gallery, St Petersburg
- 2009 — ‘The Classical Garden of German Romanticism’. Botanical Museum, St Petersburg,

== Selected group exhibitions ==
- 2024 — Yes, Fountain. Albatross space, Paris
- 2023 — Colonial Endurance. Detecting the Algorithm of Violence in Infrastructures], Nieuwe Instituut, Rotterdam, NL
- 2023 — Là où nos mondes se touchent. Cité internationale des arts, Paris
- 2022 — Communication. Studio 44. Stockholm. SE
- 2022 — Futu Muhu 2022 / Flora & fauna. Kadriorg Gallery. Tallinn, Estonia
- 2022 —The Thinking Landscape, Museum of Moscow, Moscow. RU
- 2021 — Exhibition of nominees for the 13th Kandinsky Prize. MM0MA. Moscow
- 2021 — Intensive Places. Estonian Museum of Contemporary Art, Tallinn, Estonia
- 2020 — 2nd Garage Triennial of Russian Contemporary art, Moscow, Russia
- 2020 — NEMOSKVA is Just Around the Corner. Exhibition Hall Manege, St Petersburg, Russia
- 2020 — State of Emergency. Triumph gallery, Moscow, Russia
- 2018 — Portal Zaryadye, Shchusev Museum of Architecture, Moscou, RU
- 2015 — The 3rd Ural Industrial biennial of contemporary art. Artist-in-Residence Program. Ekaterinburg, Russia
- 2015 — Russia. Realism. XXI Century, The Russian Museum, St Petersburg, Russia
- 2014 — ‘The Other Capital’, Museum of Moscow, Moscow, Russia
- 2014 — ‘Black Envy’ in a Parallel Events of the Manifesta 10, Borey Gallery, St Petersburg, Russia
- 2014 — ‘Kommunal Ghetto’ as a part of ‘Apartment Art as Domestic Resistance’ exhibition Public programs Manifesta 10, St Petersburg, Russia
- 2014 — ‘Signal’, ‘KB Signal’, St Petersburg, Russia
- 2014 — ‘Saving Venice’, Marina Gisich Gallery, St Petersburg, Russia
- 2014 — ‘Perceiving Art’, St Petersburg State Library for the Blind, St Petersburg, Russiassia,
- 2013 — The 11th Baltic States Biennale of Graphic Art ‘Kaliningrad– Konigsberg 2013’. The Kaliningrad State Art Gallery. Kaliningrad, Russia
- 2013 — 2nd international public art festival Art Prospect Festival. St Petersburg, Russia
- 2013 — V Biennale ‘New ideas for the city.’ The Garden City. Green urbanism, The Museum of Urban Sculpture. St Petersburg, Russia
- 2013 — Season of St Petersburg Art. Navicula Artis. ‘Found in St Petersburg’. KultProekt gallery, Moscow, Russia
- 2012 — Baltic Biennale 2012, Rizzordi Art Foundation, St Petersburg, Russia
- 2012 — Nel Modo Russico, Ten 43 gallery, New York
- 2012 — ‘10^{−9}’, 3H+K gallery, Pori, Finland
- 2001 — ‘Microfest 01 Pro’, Pro Arte Institute, St Petersburg, Russia
- 1999 — ‘Divietodisosta’. Artezero gallery, Milan, Italy

== Gallery ==
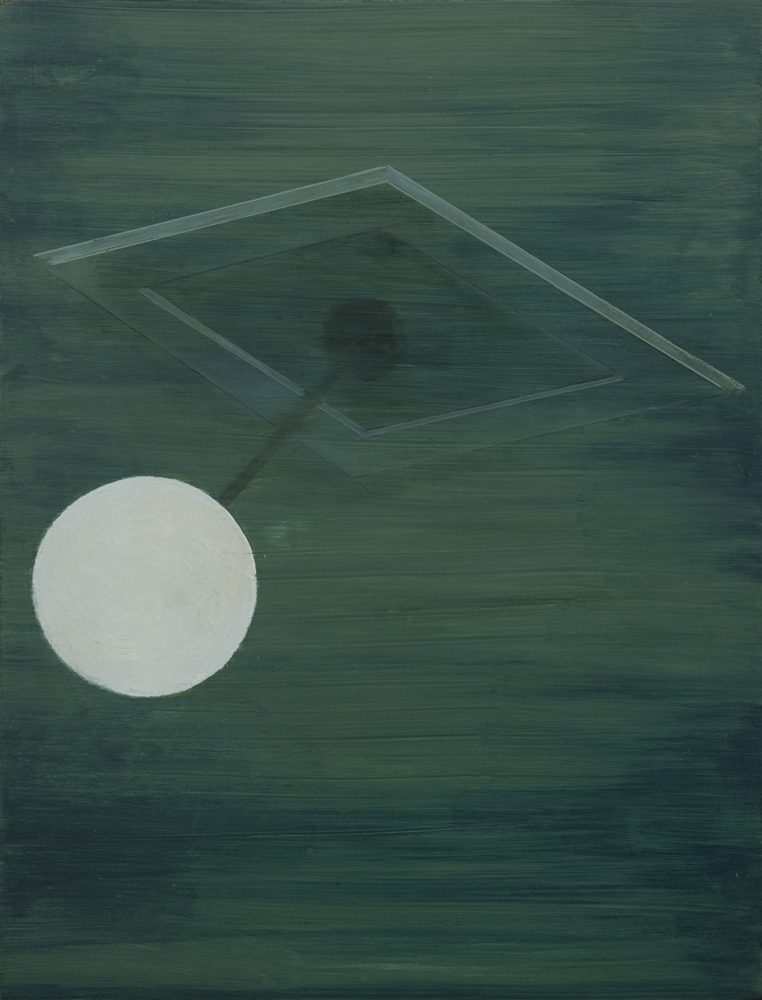
Alexander Morozov. Lamp. 2014. Tempera on gessoed panel. 42 × 32 × 3 cm

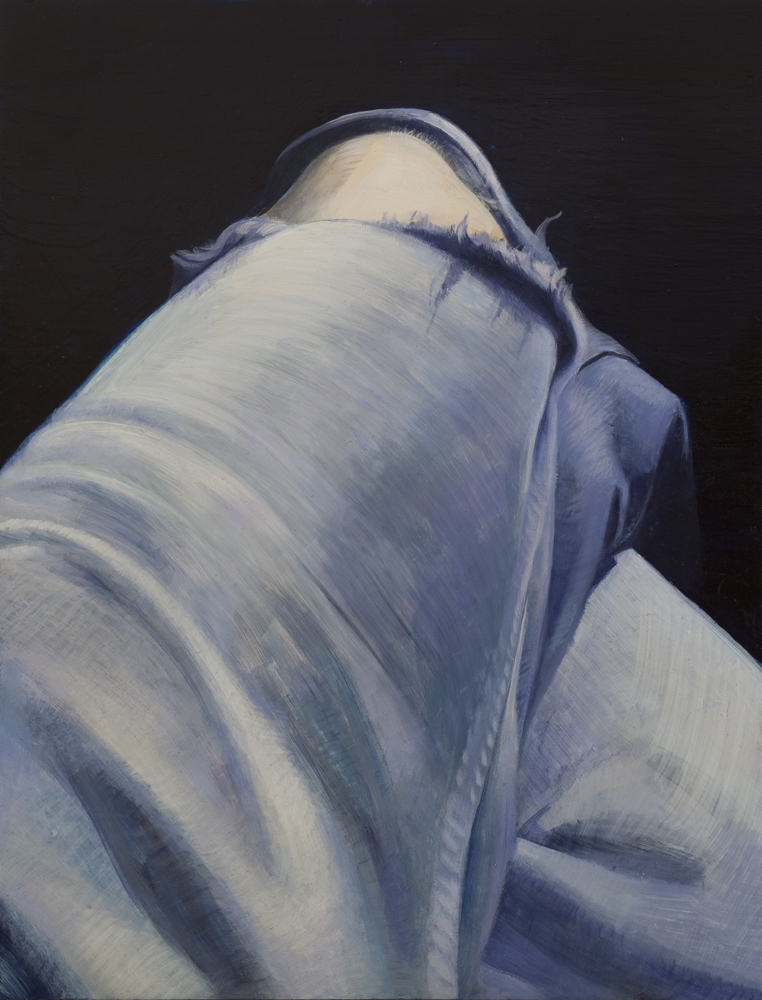
Alexander Morozov. Work Trousers. 2014. Tempera on gessoed panel. 42 × 32 × 3 cm

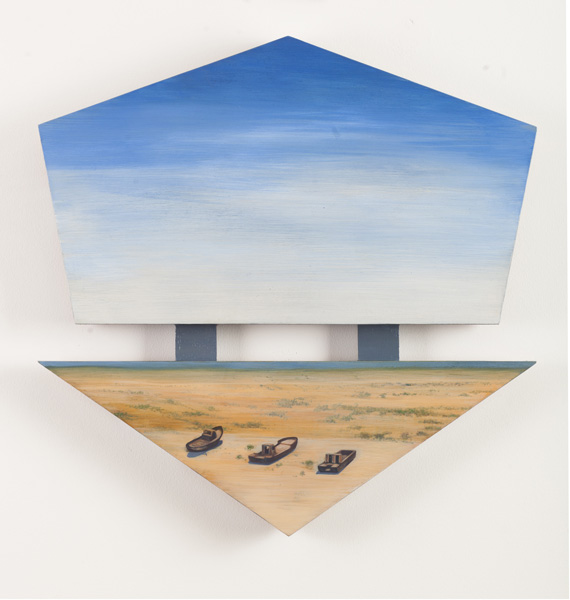
Alexander Morozov. Cosa Mentale No.2. 2015. Egg tempera on gessoed panel. 54 × 54 × 3 cm

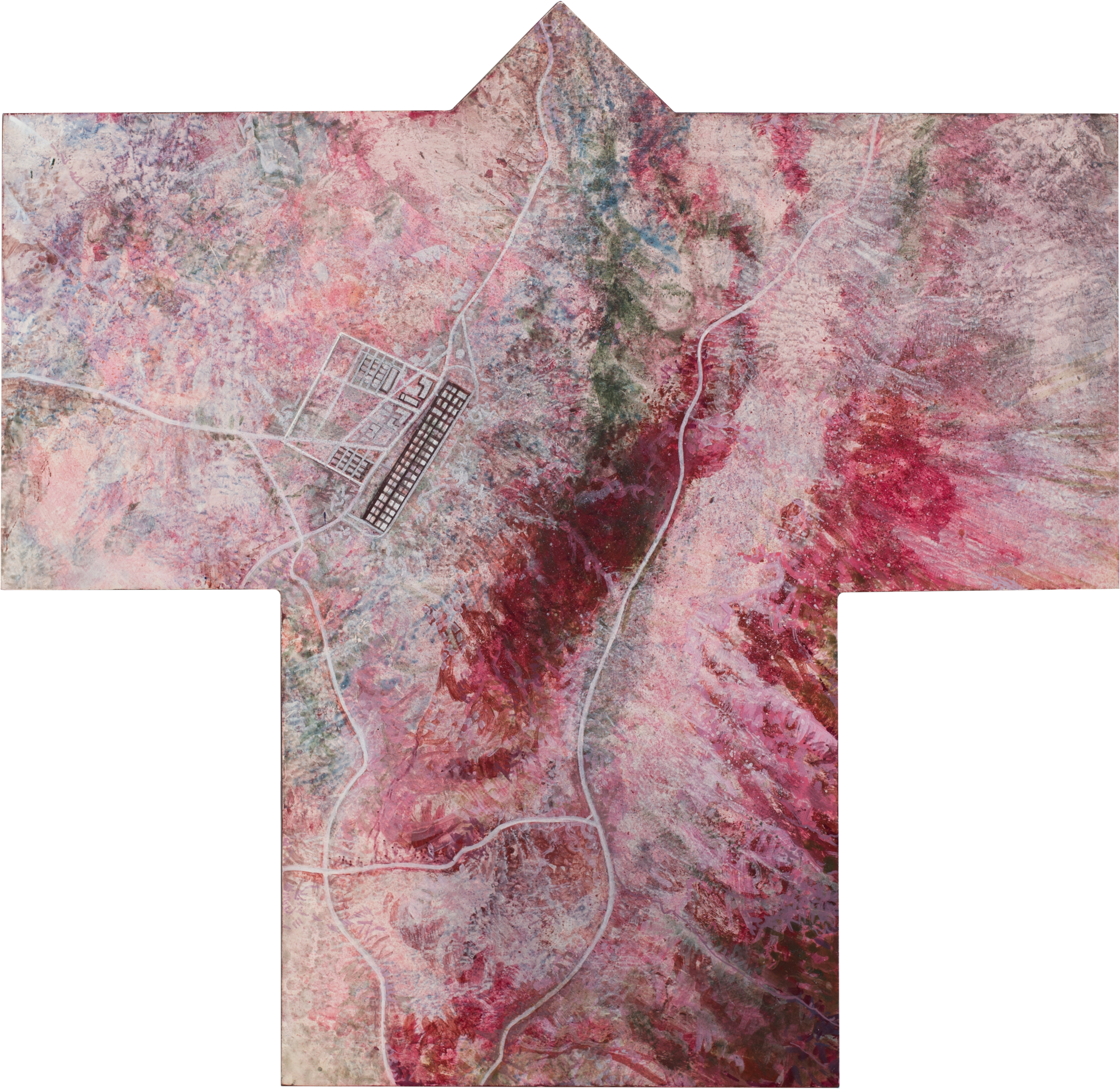
Alexander Morozov. Cosa Mentale No.8. 2018. Egg tempera on gessoed panel. 55 × 57 × 3 cm

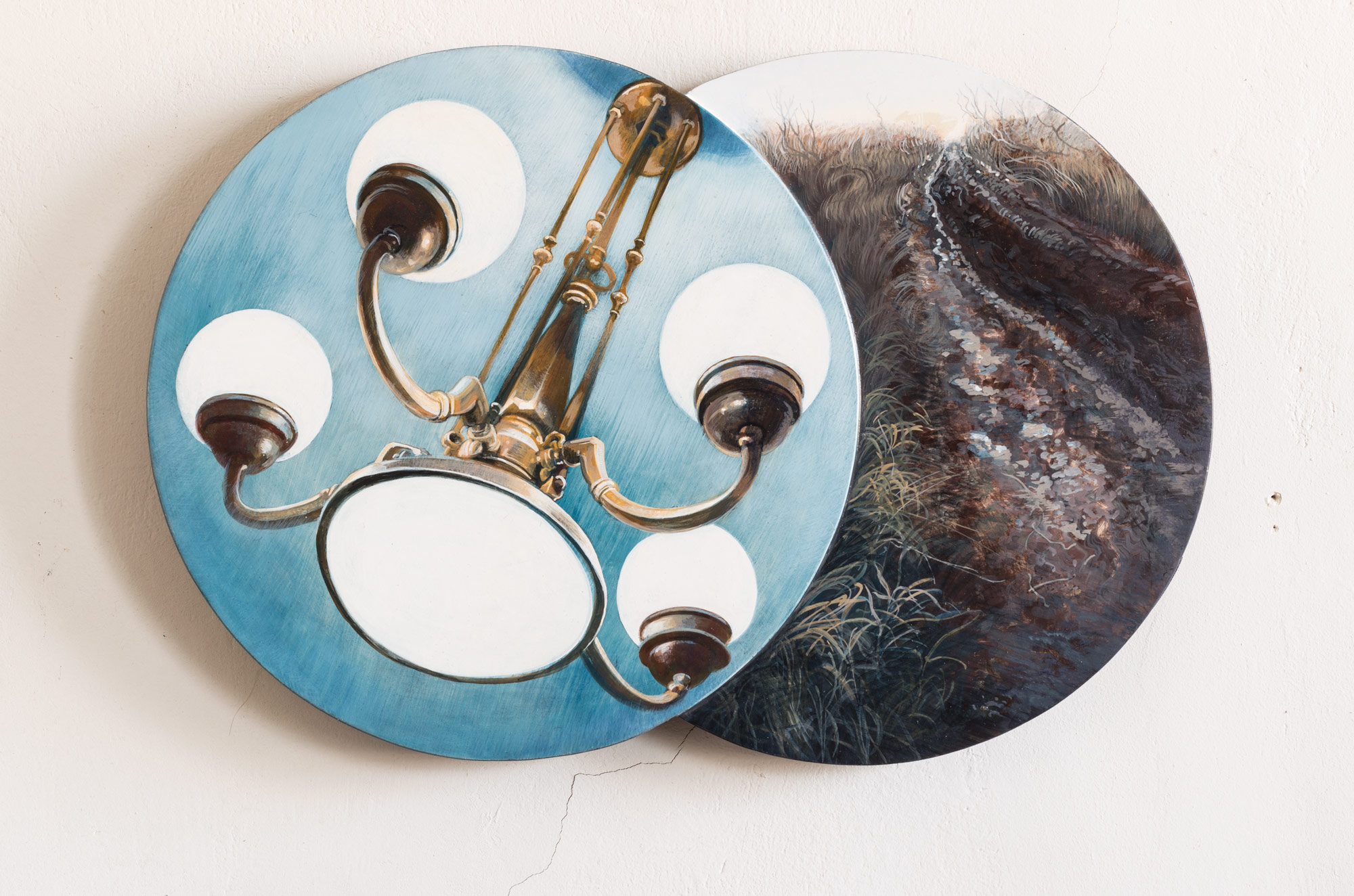
Alexander Morozov. Cape Tobizina. 2016. Egg tempera on gessoed panel. 44 × 66 cm

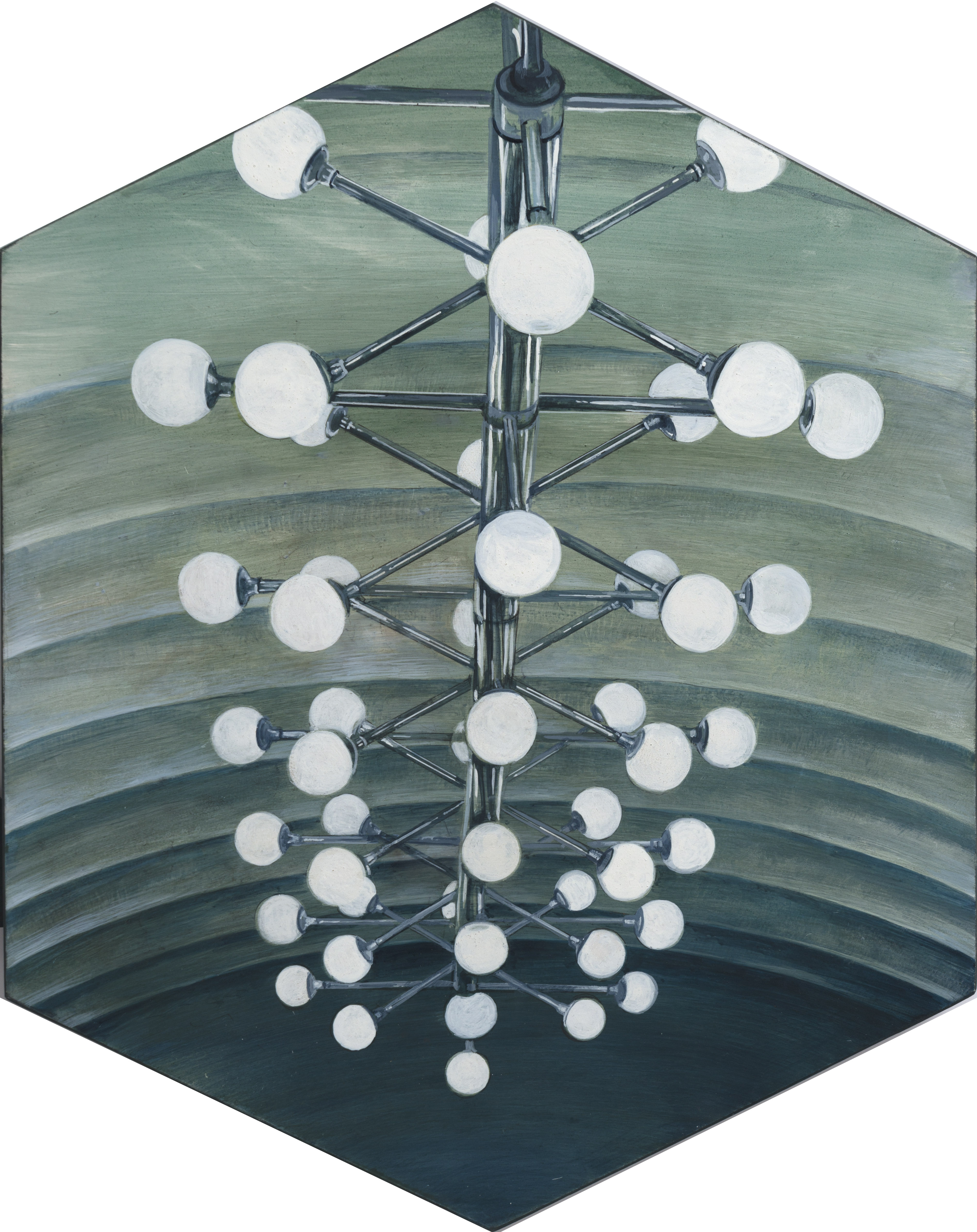
Alexander Morozov. Ozerki. 2016. Egg tempera on gessoed panel. 53,5×42,8×3 cm

== Collections ==
- The State Russian Museum, St Petersburg, RU
- Anatoly Zverev Museum, Moscow, RU
- Kaliningrad State Art Gallery, Kaliningrad, RU
- Library of book graphics, St. Petersburg, RU
- Krasnoyarsk Museum Center, Krasnoyarsk, RU
- Sergey Kuryokhin Centre for Contemporary Art, St.Petersburg, RU
- Copelouzos Family Art Museum, Athens, GR
- Street Art Museum St.Petersburg, RU
- The Perm State Art Gallery, Perm, RU
