= Tobreluts =

Tobreluts is an Estonian surname. Notable people with the surname include:

- Indrek Tobreluts, Estonian former biathlete and cross-country skier
- Olga Tobreluts, Russian artist
- Sirje Tobreluts, Estonian government official and political activist
