= Sergey Letov =

Russian musician (born 1956)

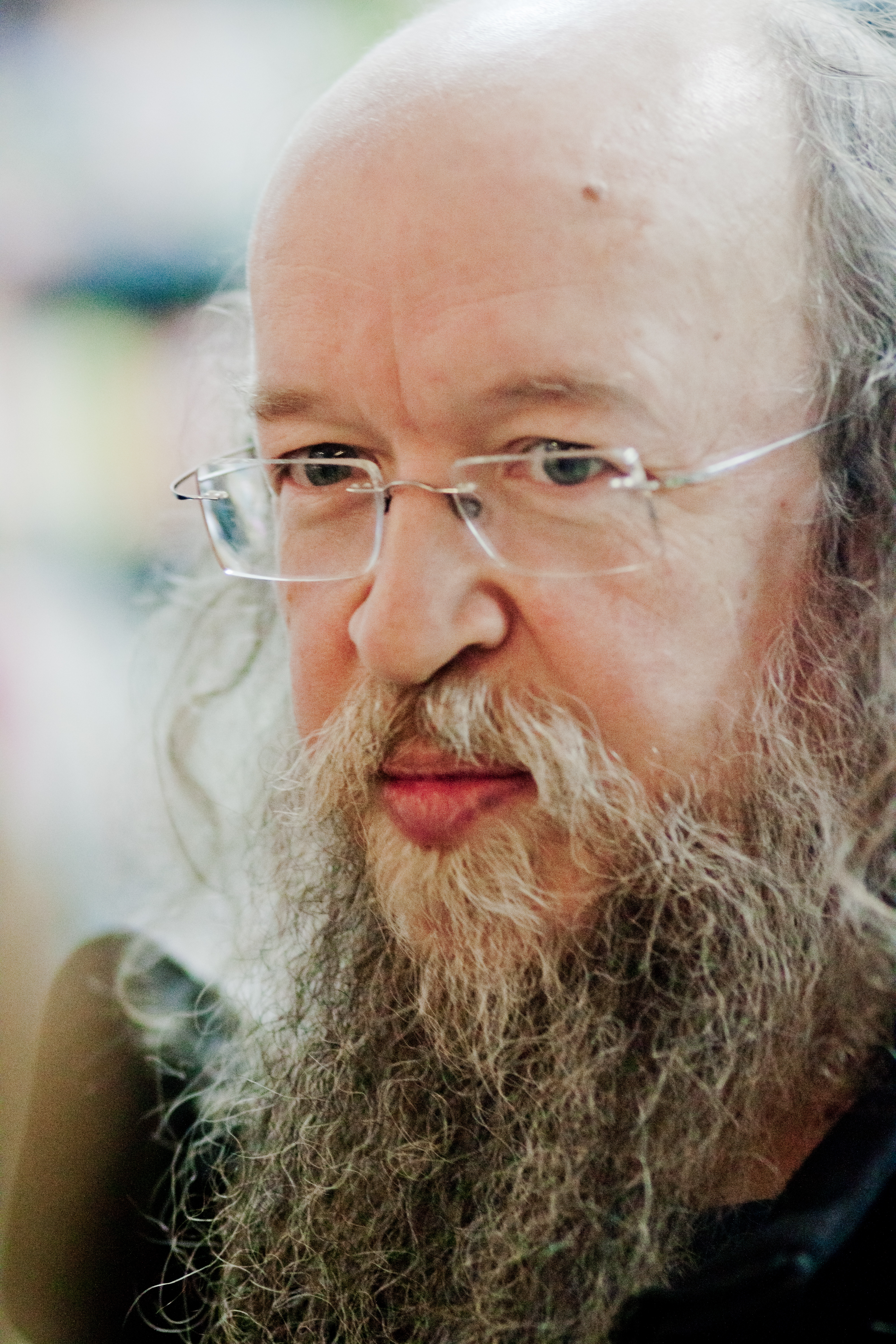
- Letov in December 2012

Background information
- Born: September 24, 1956 (age 70)
- Origin: Semey, Kazakh SSR
- Genres: Free jazz, experimental rock, free improvisation, ethnic music, avant-garde, jazz fusion
- Instruments: saxophone, bass clarinet, flute
- Label: Pentagram
- Website: Homepage on Sergey Letov

Sergey Fyodorovich Letov (Russian: Серге́й Фё́дорович Ле́тов, born September 24, 1956), is a Russian musician and composer, known for his improvisational style. He is the founder of the recording label Pentagram. He has collaborated with numerous jazz, avant-garde, modern classical, rock and electronic music artists, including his younger brother Yegor Letov, composer Sergey Kuryokhin, and cult Soviet art punk band DK. Letov has written music for movies and plays, collaborating with Russian, Italian and Austrian theatres, the German non-profit cultural association Goethe-Institut, and the Moscow Institute of Journalism and Literature.

Sergey Letov's full musical biography titled “World Greatest Musicians. Sergey Letov” ("Величайшие Музыканты Мира. Сергей Летов") was published in 2004 by a French jazz researcher Marc Sarrazi both in Russian and in French.

== Discography ==
The following is a partial list of albums featuring Sergey Letov

- TRI-O. Trialogue. SoLyd Records, 1995
- Document. New Music from Russia. The 80-s. Leo Records
- Conspiracy. Zurich 1989. Leo Records
- Sergey Kuryokhin Polynesia. SoLyd Records
- Sergey Kuryokhin and Pop-Mechanika. Live in France. Kurizza records
- Kings and cabbages. Moscow Composers Orchestra. Leo Records
- Moscow Composers Orchestra and Sainkho. Life at City Garden. U-Sound
- Soft Animals. Conquest of the Arctic. Random
- Dice 2. She Says. Ishtar Records
- Sergey Kuryokhin. Tragedy, Rock Style. Union Records
- Sergey Kuryokhin. Divine Madness. Leo Records
- DK. A cup of tea. SS Records
- The soldier Semenov. Step back! ZVUKOREKI
- Sainkho. Out of Tuva. Craw 6
- DDT. Time. DDT Records
- Inna Kuznetsova. A lonely island + 4 Remakes DJ OBJie. Objective Music
- Suchilin, Letov, Pillaev. Palma mira (A Palm of Peace). Objective Music
- Umka & Bronevichok. Komandovat' paradom. Otdeleniye vyhod
- DK. A mine field by the 8 of March. SS Records
- DK. Moskva kolbasnaya. SS Records
- AU (Pig) Holiday of Disobedience or The Last Day of Pompei 1998
- Valentina Ponomareva. FORTE. Boheme Music
- Yury Yaremchuk. Duets. Landy Star
- Misha Feigin with Serguei Letov. Moscow in June. Spontaneous Folks Records
- DK. DMB-85. SS Records
- DK. An Occupation. SS Records
- DK. Tantsy-Shmantsy Brahmsa SS Records
- DK. Boga Nyet SS Records
- DK. Do osnovania a zatem. SS Records
- DK. Snova liubov' poselitsa. SS Records
- Nick Rock-n-Roll and group Trite Dushu. Padre. Branch "exit".
- Sergey Kuryokhin. Italy. Solyd Records
- Sergey Kuryokhin. Iblivyi opossum. Solyd Records
- Sergey Kuryokhin. Don Carlos. Solyd Records
- Sergey Kuryokhin. Prizrak Kommunisma. Solyd Records
- DK. FAMILY of the FLOWER KINGS. SS Records
- TRI-O and one D.A.Prigov. HOR Records
- Sergey Letov, Alexei Borisov, Anton Nikkilä. HOR Records
- Grazhdanskaya Oborona. Zvezdopad. HOR Records
- Grazhdanskaya Oborona. Tribute. Misteria zvuka
- Grazhdanskaya Oborona. Svoboda (Freedom). HOR Records
- Yegor Letov, Sergei Letov. Concert in O.G.I.. HOR Records
- Golden Years of Soviet New Jazz. Volume III. Leo records
- Sergei Letov - Yury Parfenov. Secret Doctrine. HOR Records
- Vladimir Miller and Quartets. Long Arms
- Andrei Suchilin. Quasiland
- Virtual Flowers. Dark Cocktail. Random Music
- Sokolovsky Ivan, Letov Serguei. Simulated Prison. Random Music
- THE NEW BLOCKADERS/GOSPLAN TRIO. Sound Sketch for Raging Flames
- Rada & Ternovnik. Zagovory. Vyrgorod
- Sainkho Namtchylak. Arzhaana. Asia+
- Sergey Kuryokhin. Pop-Mechanics. WESTBAM
- TRI-O & Sainkho. Forgotten streets of St. Petersburg. Leo Records
- HLAM. Woodstockeveryday. HLAM Records
- Zoo Jazz. Hivernale Pudeur. Sergey Letov. Pascal Rousseau. Ivan Sokolovsky. Exotica EXO 03137
- Alex Rostotsky/Yury Parfenov. Once Upon a Time in the City of Kazan Cosmic Sounds CS-17
- EMBRYO 2000 live vol. 1 Indigo 9753–2
- Sergey Letov, Alexei Borisov, D. A. Prigov. Concert in O.G.I. Otdelenie VYHOD V 168
- RADA and GOSPLAN trio OTDELENIE VYHOD CD B242
- KILLDOZER. Vadim Kurilev and Sergey Letov.
- Elektricheskiye Partizany (Electric Guerillas). Chyorny Protuberanets ili Nam Nuzhna Anarkhiya
- Symphony of Horror. Cisfinitum and Sergey Letov.
- Oxford News. Lidya Kavina, Sergey Letov, Vladimir Kitliar, Misha Salnikov and Alexei Borisov.
