= Sparrow Oratorium/Four Seasons =

Sparrow Oratorium "Four Seasons"

Studio album by Sergey Kuryokhin
- Released: 1993
- Studio: M&M Studio, St. Petersburg, Russia
- Genre: Modern Classical, Experimental
- Language: Fictional Language "Sparrow Language"
- Label: Sparrow International AS
- Producer: Aleksey Yershov

Sparrow Oratorium "Four Seasons" (Russian: Воробьиная оратория) is an album by Sergey Kuryokhin released in 1993 by the Norwegian label Sparrow International AS. It was recorded at the M&M Studio in St. Petersburg, Russia between 1992 and 1993. A Russian reissue of the album was released by the label Pop-Mechanika (Поп-Механика) in 2000.

== Creation ==
The project was inspired by Kuryokhin's acquaintance with Norwegian ecologist and bird enthusiast Jon Melbye, who is said to have told the composer about importance of sparrows in urban environments as a predictor of its ecological condition. Kuryokhin began closely studying and counting St. Petersburg sparrows and found that these birds were in fact leaving the city. According to Kuryokhin biographer Aleksandr Kušnir, these observations, alongside readings of "Principles of Phonology” by Russian linguist Nikolai Trubetskoy inspired the idea of a fictional "sparrow language". The vocals on the album are thus sung in a made-up "sparrow" language, mixing Russian, Latin and Ukrainian phonemes.

The 1st track on the album, "Winter", is a remaster of "Hare Krishna, Donna Anna" (Харе Кришна, Донна Анна!) off Kuryokhin's 1992 release, The Rich's Opera (Опера Богатых).

== Release ==
The album was officially released in 1993 on CD. Prior to its release, it was presented in Oslo, Norway in April 1993. The album was presented in St. Petersburg in May 1993 in live concert at the Oktyabrsky concert hall - in an avant-garde operatic performance featuring Kuryokhin, Marina Kapuro, as well as other musicians from the scene at the time, including members of the band Kino and Aquarium, and others who were members of Pop-Mehanika.

== Track listing ==
All tracks are written by Sergey Kuryokhin.

No.	Title	Vocals	Length
1.	"Winter"	Olga Kondina	3:59
2.	"Spring"	Marina Kapuro	9:55
3.	"Summer"	Marina Kapuro	12:11
4.	"Autumn"	Marina Kapuro	8:32
5.	"Sparrow's Winter Song"	Marina Kapuro	5:46
6.	"Sparrow Fields Forever"	Marina Kapuro	6:31
Total length:			46:51
