= Kuryokhin Center =

Cultural centre in Saint Petersburg

Coordinates: 59.925897°N 30.357192°E

The Kuryokhin Center, or more extended the Sergey Kuryokhin Center for Modern Art, is a non-profit cultural centre in Saint Petersburg, Russia. The centre was founded in 2004 and named after the Russian avant garde composer Sergey Kuryokhin. The main space of the centre has a capacity of 2000 people. The venue is located in an old cinema building.

== About Kuryokhin Center ==
The Kuryokhin Center organises visual art exhibitions, art events and festivals. The Modern Art Center is an old cinema space. It hosts experimental music, film and art festivals (SKIF, Electro-mechanika Festival, Videoforma festival and Ethno-mechanica Festival) and a few other random events several times per year.

== SKIF and Electro-Mechanica ==
The Sergey Kuryokhin International Festival (SKIF) is an annual international festival of modern music and arts that has taken place since 1998. Kuryokhin's long-time partner cellist Boris Raiskin conceived the festival in New York City. SKIF-1 and SKIF-2 took place in New York in 1997 and 1998. In October 1998 SKIF-3 moved to Saint Petersburg, the city where Kuryokhin lived and worked.

Electro-Mechanica is an annual festival since 2007 representing electronic audio-visual arts including music, animation, videos, films, installations and performances

== See also ==
- Sergey Kuryokhin Contemporary Art Award

== Sources and references ==
- Kuryokhin Center Catalogue
