= The Ways of Freedom =

1981 album by Sergey Kuryokhin

Studio album by Sergey Kuryokhin
- Released: 1981
- Recorded: 2 April 1981
- Genre: Jazz
- Length: 54:25
- Label: Melodiya

Professional ratings
Review scores
Source	Rating
AllMusic	4.5/5 stars
The Penguin Guide to Jazz	3/4 stars

The Ways of Freedom is a solo piano album by Sergey Kuryokhin.

== Releases and reception ==
The album was first released by the Soviet label Melodiya. It was reissued by Leo Records. The Penguin Guide to Jazz wrote that Kuryokhin "can sound as tightly disciplined as a classical pianist and as vividly intense and rapid-fingered as [Art] Tatum." The AllMusic reviewer concluded: "This is an incredible document and shouldn't be missed by any serious student of avant-garde piano."

== Track listing ==
1. "Theory and Practice" – 7:00
2. "The Wall" – 2:23
3. "The Rules of the Game" – 2:11
4. "Archipelago" – 8:44
5. "No Exit" – 1:47
6. "The Inner Fear" – 1:04
7. "The Other Way" – 15:46
8. "The Great Escape" – 4:44
9. "Fresh Air" – 4:20
10. "New Dawn" – 3:29
