= Sergey Kuryokhin Contemporary Art Award =

Annual art competition

The Sergey Kuryokhin Contemporary Art Award is an annual art competition hosted by the Kuryokhin Center. The award was established in 2009 and is named after Russian composer Sergey Kuryokhin.

Categories for the Sergey Kuryokhin Contemporary Art Award include Grand-Prix Pop-Mechanica, Best Curatorial Project, Best Visual Art Project, Best Media Object, Best Public Art Project, Best Text on Contemporary Art, and Best Science Art Project.

== Past winners ==
- Olga Tobreluts— 2021
- Alexander Morozov — Best Visual Art Project 2018
- Pavel Otdelnov— 2017
- Andrey Bartenev — Grand-Prix Pop-Mechanica 2016
- Polina Popova, Vyacheslav Berechinsky, Afrika, and Pavel Pepperstein — Best Curatorial Project 2016
- Sasha Obukhova —Best Text on Contemporary Art 2014
