= Dude — Water Winner =

1991 film by Arkadiy Tigay

- DVD Cover
- Russian: Лох — победитель воды
- Directed by: Arkadiy Tigay
- Written by: Arkadiy Tigay
- Produced by: Tatiana Naumova
- Starring: Sergey Kuryokhin; Larisa Borodina; Andrey Ponomaryov; Vladimir Eryomin; Aleksandr Glazun
- Cinematography: Yuri Veksler
- Edited by: Raisa Lisova
- Music by: Sergey Kuryokhin
- Production companies: Lenfilm; Trinity Bridge; Company
- Release date: 1991
- Running time: 86 min.
- Country: Soviet Union
- Language: Russian

Dude — Water Winner (Russian: Лох — победитель воды, romanized: Lokh — pobeditel vody) is a 1991 Soviet crime thriller film directed by Arkadiy Tigay.

== Plot ==
In the early 1990s, Pavel Gorelikov (Sergey Kuryokhin), a mild-mannered intellectual, runs a computer salon called “Energy” in Leningrad with his friend Kostya, a disabled Afghan war veteran (Andrey Ponomaryov). After Pavel refuses to pay protection money to local racketeers, explaining he can’t afford their demands, both he and the salon are attacked. Kostya, who returns unexpectedly, manages to fend off the assailants.

Later that night, unknown intruders break into Pavel’s apartment and brutally assault him. The following morning, Kostya is found dead in the wrecked salon. Realizing the police won’t help, Pavel decides to take matters into his own hands to avenge his friend’s death. Amidst this turmoil, Pavel falls for a young woman he meets (Larisa Borodina), a bartender facing similar intimidation from racketeers.

== Cast ==
- Sergey Kuryokhin as Pavel Gorelikov
- Larisa Borodina as Valentina
- Andrey Ponomaryov as Kostya
- Vladimir Eryomin as Mobster
- Aleksandr Glazun as Mobster
- Valentin Zhilyayev as Mafia boss
- Andrey Krasko as Mobster
- Viktor Tregubovich as Co-operator
- Gabriel Vorobyov as Lover of mafia boss
- Igor Yakovlev as Popik, mobster
- Maria Kapnist as mafioso
