= Katsuyuki Itakura =

Japanese jazz pianist (1943–2014)

Katsuyuki Itakura (板倉克行, Itakura Katsuyuki; b. Taiwan, 1943 - January 10, 2014), nicknamed Katsu, is a Japanese free jazz pianist. He made his debut in 1962 and has made ten recordings. He has performed throughout Japan, as well as in the United States and in Europe. In 1995 he performed in London for the 15th anniversary of Leo Records. In 2000 he performed at the Florida Jazz and Blues Festival.

Itakura began studying classical music at the age of 7. His work combines composition and improvisation and is often humorous in nature. He has performed or recorded with Kenny Millions, Peter Brötzmann, Dave Holland, Scott Robinson, Bruce Eisenbeil and Stephen Flinn.

Since 1985, he has curated the music series at Club Ornette in Ashikaga, Japan.
