= Keshavan Maslak =

American jazz musician

Kenneth Keshavan Maslak, who also performs under the stage name Kenny Millions (born February 26, 1950), is an American jazz multi-instrumentalist, avant-garde performance artist, poet and restaurateur.

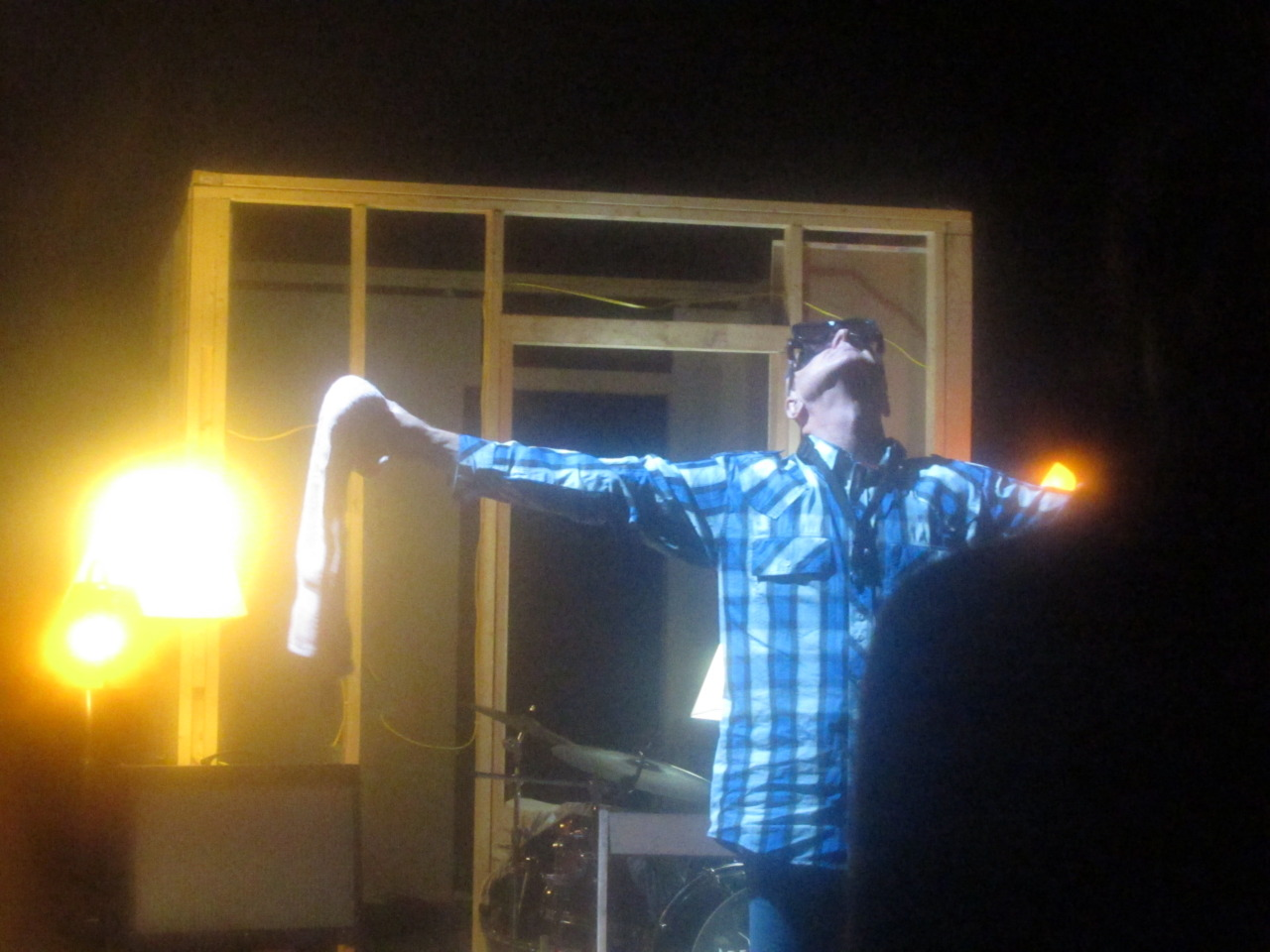
K.M.

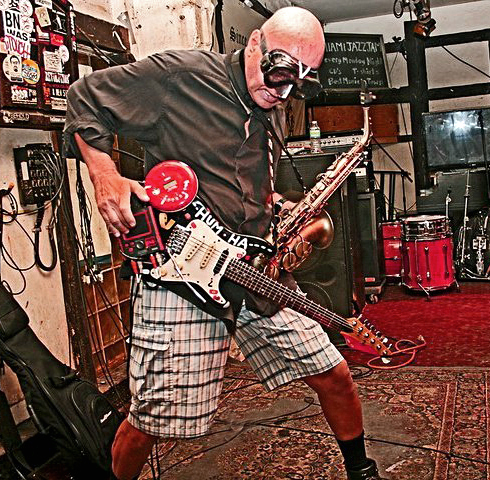
Kenny Millions live

== Biography ==
Kenneth Keshavan Maslak was born in downtown Detroit, Michigan, United States, to a family of Ukrainian immigrants, who worked at the Ford Motor Company. Kenny began studying music from his grandfather at the age of five on the mandolin, and then started on the clarinet and saxophone at the age of six. He began working professionally from the age of 12. While attending Cass Technical High School, Kenny became a student of Larry Teal and Donald Sinta. After high school Maslak studied music and psychology at the University of Michigan, Eastern Michigan University and North Texas State University, where he studied music composition with Martin Mailman in the late 1960s. Following this he played with Motown touring bands and many other jazz and R&B bands.

After two years living in San Francisco and playing with Charles Moffett, Ray Anderson and David Murray, Maslak moved to New York City in 1972 and participated in the New York loft scene during the 1970s, performing his compositions frequently at Studio Rivbea, Ladies' Fort, Maslak Gallerxy, The Kitchen, Five Spot Cafe, Village Vanguard, CBGB, Museum of Modern Art and at the Charlotte Moorman avant-garde festivals. At The Kitchen he performed with experimental musicians such as Garrett List, Rhys Chatham, Philip Glass, and Laurie Anderson, and associated with John Cage. During that period he developed his conceptual style of musical performance which he refers to as Multiplexmulti. Maslak also invented the Hum Ha Horn, which he recorded with on some of his early LPs.

From 1978 to 1981, Maslak lived in Amsterdam, Netherlands, where he played in avant-garde jazz circles with groups such as Instant Composer's Pool and recorded several titles for Leo Records, Black Saint Records and various other European labels with his trio. He also formed a punk rock-free jazz group, Loved by Millions, in which he began to use the pseudonym Kenny Millions. He returned to New York City in 1981 then first moved to Miami, Florida, in 1987. From 1988 to 1989, he lived in Brussels, Belgium, and in Moscow, The Soviet Union. Moving back to Miami in 1989, he and his wife became restaurateurs and opened up Sushi Blues Cafe and then afterwards Cafe Jamm in Florida, which they retired from in 2011.

Maslak has also collaborated with Hannibal Lokumbe, Abbey Rader, Paul Bley, Jack DeJohnette, Katsuyuki Itakura, Kazutoki Umezu, Sergey Kuryokhin, Sam Rivers, Sunny Murray, Frank Wright, Rashied Ali, Curtis Fuller, Marty Cook, Otomo Yoshihide, Toshinori Kondo, Roland Kirk, Misha Mengelberg, Han Bennink, Peter Brötzmann, Derek Bailey, Roscoe Mitchell, John Tchicai, Dr. John, Mick Taylor, Bobby Keys, The Rolling Stones, Larry Coryell, Stan Getz, Chet Baker, Eddie Kirkland, Thurston Moore, Otto von Schirach, Blowfly, Kool Keith, Tatsuya Nakatani, Weasel Walter, Frank "Rat Bastard" Falestra, and others.

== Discography ==
- Cass Tech Symphony Band (Cass Tech, 1964)
- One O'clock Lab Band (North Texas State, 1969)
- Lower East Side Insane Shit (Hum Ha, 1974)
- Multiplexmulti (Hum Ha, 1977)
- Variations on a Coffee Machine (Kharma, 1977)
- Maslak 1000 (Waterland, 1978)
- Buddha's Hand (Circle, 1978)
- New York Bust Out (Hum Ha, 1978)
- Mayhem in Our Streets (Waterland, 1979)
- Humanplexity (Leo, 1979)
- Loved by Millions (Leo, 1980)
- Big Time (Daybreak, 1981)
- Blaster Master (Black Saint, 1981)
- Dead in Germany (Moers Music, 1982)
- Japan/Japon (DIW, 1983)
- Lovely (ITM, 1985)
- Better and Better (Leo, 1986)
- Get the Money Whatever It Takes (Leo, 1987)
- The Ass (Hum Ha, 1988)
- Mother Russia (Leo, 1989)
- Madmen from the Moon (Soundings of the Planet, 1990)
- Not To Be a Star (Black Saint, 1992)
- Soul Brothers (Hum Ha, 1992)
- Romance in the Big City (Leo, 1993)
- Play Satie (Hum Ha, 1993)
- Harmonic Motion (Third Stream, 1994)
- Excuse Me Mr. Satie (Leo, 1994)
- Suburban Utopic (Abray, 1995)
- Jet Lag (Solyd, 1996)
- Friends Afar (Sound Wave, 1996)
- Dear John Cage (Long Arm, 1996)
- Ground Zero Plays Standards (Nani, 1997)
- Live at the Rip-Off Knitting Factory (Hum Ha, 1997)
- Kenny Millions Jams (Hum Ha, 1998)
- Without Kuryokhin (Long Arms, 1999)
- Ping Pong Birthday (Hum Ha, 1999)
- Back to It (Hum Ha, 2000)
- Live in Hollywood (Hum Ha, 2000)
- I Wish I Was A Bird (Hum Ha, 2000)
- Eat Cake (Hum Ha, 2000)
- Beautiful and Boring (Hum Ha, 2000)
- Junko's Dream (Hum Ha, 2000)
- Mixed Nuts (Hum Ha, 2000)
- No Money No Honey (Hum Ha, 2001)
- Brother Charles (Hum Ha, 2001)
- April in Japan (Hum Ha, 2001)
- Masking Tape Music (Hum Ha, 2001)
- Tokyo Is Now (Hum Ha, 2001)
- Screams and Whispers (Hum Ha, 2001)
- Blues Inside Out (Hum Ha, 2001)
- Live in Nasu (Hum Ha, 2001)
- Sun and Fun (Hum Ha, 2001)
- Space Between Worlds (Hum Ha, 2001)
- Blue Skies (Hum Ha, 2001)
- Jazz Fantasy (Hum Ha, 2002)
- When You're Smiling (Hum Ha, 2002)
- Let Freedom Swing (Hum Ha, 2002)
- Kenny Meets Tatsu (Hum Ha, 2002)
- Midnight in Chicago (Hum Ha, 2002)
- Feed the Kitty (Hum Ha, 2003)
- Mad Giants of Jazz (Hum Ha, 2005)
- Wild Candy (Hum Ha, 2005)
- Groove Detroit (Hum Ha, 2006)
- West Side (Hum Ha, 2006)
- Detroit Bohemia Live (Hum Ha, 2007)
- Bim Huis Live 1st Set (Hum Ha, 2008)
- Eat Shit @ Churchill's (Hum Ha, 2009)
- No Mor Musik (ugEXPLODE, 2010)
- Millions of Bastards (Hum Ha, 2010)
- Screams in Brooklyn (Hum Ha, 2011)
- Cum and Jizz (Florida Noise Ordinance, 2012)
- Weapon (MuteAnt Sounds, 2013)
- Yo Honkies (MuteAnt Sounds, 2013)
- I Died for Your Sins (Hum Ha, 2014)
- Elephants Fucking (Hum Ha, 2014)
- Making Recordings Are B.S. (Hum Ha, 2015)
- OMG Best Album Ever (MuteAnt Sounds, 2015)
- The Art of Fuck You (Hum Ha, 2016)
- Circus of the Absurd (Hum Ha, 2016)
- The Age of Stupid (Hum Ha, 2017)
- Copenhagen Bluez (MuteAnt Sounds, 2018)
- Fuck Music, Tell Jokes, You'll Make More Money (Unhinged, 2018)

== Other sources ==
- Simon Adams, "Keshavan Maslak". Grove Jazz online.
- Chris Kelsey, Keshavan Maslak at AllMusic
