= Olga Tobreluts =

Estonian-Russian-Hungarian multimedia artist

- Ольга Владимировна Тобрелутс
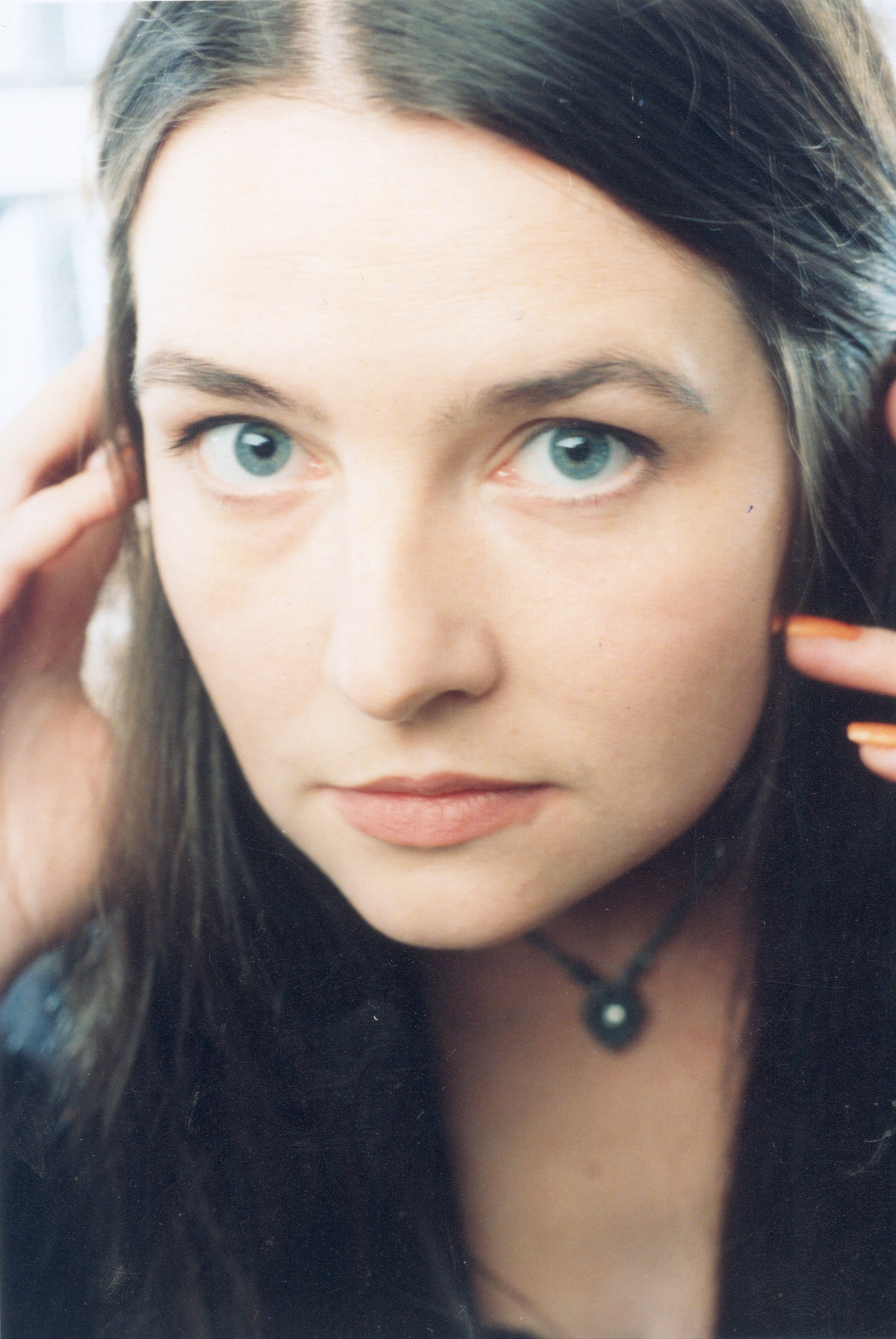
- Born: Olga Vladimirovna Komarova; December 3, 1970 (age 55); Murino, Leningrad Oblast, Soviet Union
- Education: Leningrad College of Architecture, Leningrad State University of Architecture, Leningrad Academy of Arts
- Known for: Painting, graphic art, design, cinema, photography, sculpture
- Style: New media art, pop art, contemporary art, postmodernism, abstract art, neo-academic art
- Movement: St. Petersburg neo-academic art
- Spouse: Andrey Khaas
- Awards: Sergey Kuryokhin Award (2021)
- Elected: Honorary Academicians of the Russian Academy of Arts (2016)
- Patrons: Timur Novikov
- Website: Olga Tobreluts Instagram

Olga Tobreluts (/tɔːbrɛˈluts/; December 3, 1970) is a contemporary painter and multi-media artist.

== Life and work ==
Olga Tobreluts was born on December 3, 1970, in the Murino village, Leningrad Oblast, USSR. In 1988 she graduated from the Leningrad College of Architecture and the following year she entered the Faculty of Architecture at the Leningrad State University of Architecture and Civil Engineering. She attended the Leningrad Academy of Arts as a free student.

In 1989, Tobreluts created the Laboratory for the Study of Ornament at the "A-Z" Society in Leningrad. In 1989-1990 she worked in the Evgeny Ditrich Architectural Bureau in Saint Petersburg. In 1991-1993 Tobreluts studied at the "ART+COM" Institute in Berlin. She pioneered the use of digital media in the Russian art scene. The art critic Bruce Sterling called her "Helen of Troy equipped with a video camera and a computer".

Olga Tobreluts was a leading member of Timur Novikov’s "New Academicians" active in Saint Petersburg during the 1990s. In 1994, she became a professor in the Department of new technologies in this association. In 1998, Tobreluts opened the center for the study of photography at the "Mama" club. In 2012, she founded the non-profit organisation "Saint Petersburg New Academy". After the death of Timur Novikov, Tobreluts acted as curator of many exhibitions dedicated to St. Petersburg neo-academic art.

In 2016, Olga Tobreluts was elected to Honorary Academician of the Russian Academy of Arts. From 2019 she is a member of Pacsa Art Community. Lives and works in Saint Petersburg, Budapest and Pacsa.

== Awards ==
- 1993. Award of First International Art Forum of computer art «Graphikon» for the video «Woe from Wit», Saint Petersburg, Russia
- 1995. The Audience Sympathy Award, Kwangju Biennale, Kwangju, South Korea
- 1995. First prize in «Videovision» for the video «Woe from Wit» on the Third Reality, International Forum of computer art, Saint Petersburg, Russia
- 1995. The Audience Sympathy Award on the exhibition of the New Academy of Fine Arts, Saint Petersburg, Russia
- 1998. International Award for the video art «The Manifest of Neoakademism», Karlsruhe, Germany
- 1998. Second Prize, «Best European Computer Graphics», GRIFFELKUNST Festival, Hamburg, Germany
- 2000. Art of the Future, Taipei, Taiwan
- 2014. Award of President of the Russian Academy of Arts, Moscow, Russia
- 2016. First Prize, Lenstar Lenticular Print Award, Düsseldorf, Germany within DRUPA, the world largest printing equipment exhibition
- 2021. Sergey Kuryokhin Contemporary Art Award for Best Visual Art Project, Saint Petersburg, Russia

== Works in collections ==
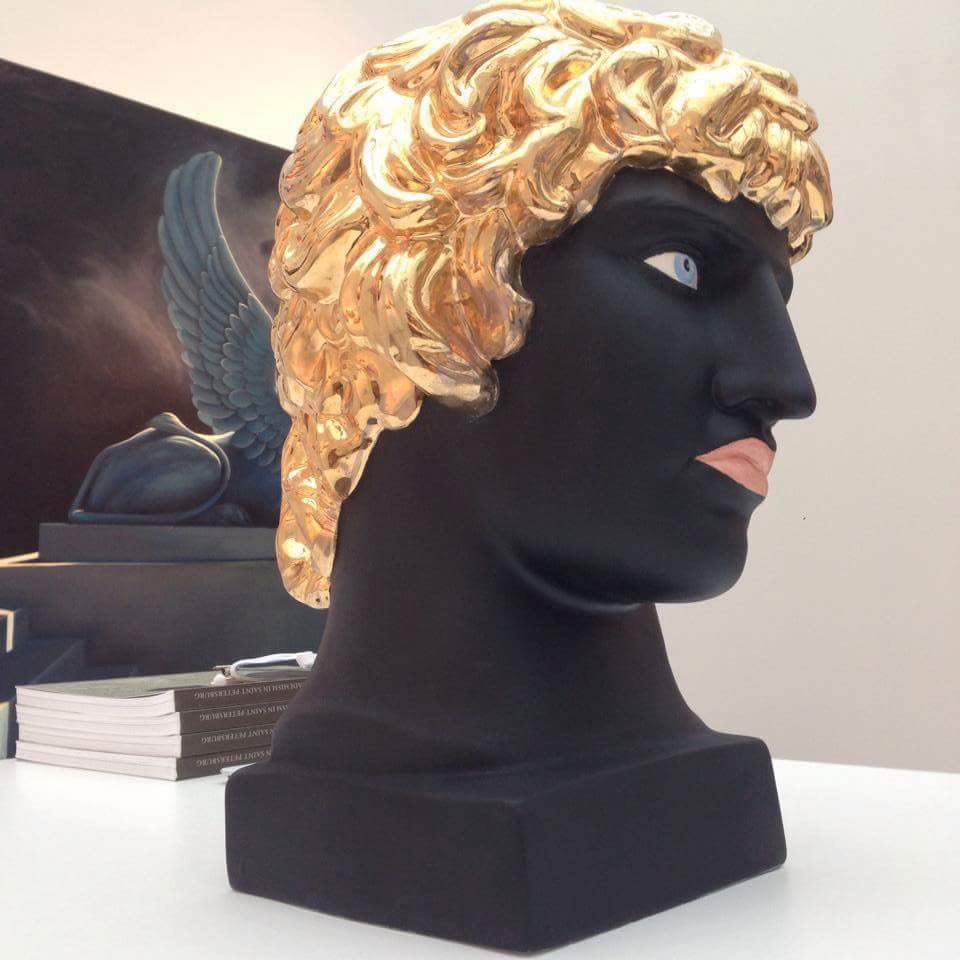
Antinous II, 2005 г.

- Museum of Modern Art, New York, USA
- Victoria and Albert Museum, London, United Kingdom
- Bornholm Art Museum, Bornholm, Denmark
- The Parkview Museum, Beijing-Singapore
- Museum of Contemporary Art, Antwerp, Belgium
- Ludwig Museum of Contemporary Art, Budapest, Hungary
- Déri Museum, Debrecen, Hungary
- Corfu Heritage Foundation, Corfu, Greece
- Art Center, Erfurt, Germany
- National Centre for Contemporary Arts, Moscow, Russia
- The Ekaterina Cultural Foundation, Moscow, Russia
- GAS Galleria, Bologna, Italy
- UVG (Ural Vision Gallery), Ekaterinburg, Russia
- Gasunie Foundation, Groningen Museum, Netherlands
- Ibsen Foundation, Oslo, Norway
- Kaliningrad State Art Gallery, Kaliningrad, Russia
- Mario Testino Foundation, Lima, Peru
- Museum GRIFFELKUNST, Hamburg, Germany
- Museum of the New Academy of Fine Arts, Saint Petersburg, Russia
- Sergey Kuryokhin Contemporary Art Center, Saint Petersburg, Russia
- Martiniplaza Collection, Groningen, Netherlands
- Moscow House of Photography, Moscow, Russia
- Aslan Chekhoyev New Museum, Saint Petersburg, Russia
- Nizhni Tagil Museum of Fine Arts, Nizhni Tagil, Russia
- Galleria d’arte moderna Achille Forti, Verona, Italy
- Revoltella Museum, Triest, Italy
- The State Russian Museum, Saint Petersburg, Russia
- The State Tretyakov Gallery, Moscow, Russia
- The Museum of Political History of Russia, Saint Petersburg, Russia
- Wolfgang Joop Foundation, Germany
- Bonn Women's Museum, Bonn, Germany

== Selected Solo Exhibitions ==
- 1993. Woe from Wit. First International Forum of Computer Art, Grafikon, Exploratory Laboratory, Moscow, Russia
- 1994. Emperor Reflections. Exhibition of computer photographes. Ethnographic Museum, Saint Petersburg, Russia
- 1995. Planetarium, Saint Petersburg, Russia
- 1995. Videoinstallation «Third Reality», within Videovision festival and SCARP exhibition.
- 1995. Emperor Reflections. Aidan Gallery, Moscow, Russia
- 1996. Trends in photographs. Small Manege, Moscow, Russia
- 1996. Computer Art. New Academy of Fine Arts, Saint Petersburg, Russia
- 1996. Computer Photographs. New Academy of Fine Arts, Saint Petersburg, Russia
- 1996. Olga Tobreluts. Photocenter, Copenhagen, Denmark
- 1997. Photographs. Mixed Media. ARTKIOSK, Brussels, Belgium
- 1998. Odisseus. Aidan Gallery, Moscow, Russia
- 1998. Family Portrait. Kochubei Palace, Saint Petersburg, Russia
- 1999. Models. Photo Art Centre, Saint Petersburg, Russia
- 1999. Latest works. With P.M.M.K. Ostende Art Kiosk, Belgium
- 1999. Models. Photogallery of Turku, Finland
- 1999. Labours of Hercules. Gallo-Roman Museum, Brussels, Belgium
- 1999. Mixed Media. The State Russian Museum, Saint Petersburg, Russia (with catalog)
- 1999. Fear of O.T., Gallery 21, Pushkinskaya 10 Art Centre. FNO project, Saint Petersburg, Russia (with catalog)
- 2000. Sommarustillinga, Sacred Figures. Seljord Kunstforening, Norway (with catalog)
- 2000. Allegory. Freud Dream Museum, Saint Petersburg, Russia
- 2001. Tobreluts. Gallery of Contemporary Art, San Marino
- 2001.Dream of Alexander the Great. Freud Dream Museum, Saint Petersburg, Russia
- 2001. Olga Tobreluts. Galerie der Gegenwart, Wiesbaden, Germany
- 2002. Abstract Landscape. Fotoimage Gallery, Saint Petersburg, Russia
- 2003. Sacred Figures. Orel Art Gallery, Paris, France
- 2003. Emperor and Galilean. The State Russian Museum, Saint Petersburg, Russia (with catalog)
- 2003. Emperor and Galilean. Henie Onstad Art Center, Oslo, Norway (with catalog)
- 2003. Art Digital. MARS Centre of Contemporary Art, Moscow, Russia
- 2008. Tarquin and Lucretia. Zelinsky Museum, Kaunas, Lithuania
- 2008. Olga Tobreluts. Nizny Tagil Museum of Fine Arts, Nizny Tagil, Russia
- 2012. Pieta and Resurrection. Orel Art Gallery, Paris, France
- 2012. New Mythology. AP Contemporary, Hong Kong
- 2012. New Mythology. Church of Santa Maria dei Battuti, San Vito al Tagliamento, Italy (with catalog)
- 2013. Exhibition of drawings and presentation of illustrations for the book by Kira Sapgir
- 2013. Exhibition of drawings and presentation of illustrations for the book by Alexander Borovsky «Art History For Dogs», National Center for Contemporary Art (NCCA), Moscow, Russia
- 2013. «Troo-Lya-Lya’s Bag», Garage Museum of Contemporary Art, Moscow, Russia
- 2013. Exhibition of drawings and presentation of illustrations for the book by Kira Sapgir
- 2013. New Mythology. Koltsovo Airport, Ekaterinburg, Russia
- 2013. Modernisation. MUHKA Museum of Contemporary Art, Antwerpen, Belgium
- 2013. New Mythology. Ural Vision Gallery, Ekaterinburg, Russia
- 2013. New Mythology. VISIVA Museum, Rome, Italy
- 2013. Contemporary Russian Women Artists. The Women's Art Collection, Murray Edwards College, Cambridge, United Kingdom, curated by Edward Lucie-Smith
- 2013. New Mythology. Moscow Museum of Modern Art, Moscow, Russia (with catalog)
- 2015. New Mythology. County Museum, Rovinj, Croatia
- 2015. New Mythology. Deborah Colton Gallery, Houston, Texas, United States
- 2015. Heaven Landscapes. Name Gallery, within the parallel program of Manifesta 10, Saint Petersburg, Russia
- 2015. New Abilities. Deborah Colton Gallery, Houston, Texas, United States
- 2017. New Mythology. Műcsarnok Kunsthalle, Budapest, Hungary (with catalog)
- 2018. Mythology Reloaded. MODEM, Center for Modern and Contemporary Art, Debrecen, Hungary (with catalog)
- 2018. Pieta and Resurrection. Deborah Colton Gallery, Houston, Texas, United States
- 2019. Republic of North Macedonia, Venice Biennale, Italy (with catalog). Curated by Zsolt Petranyi
- 2019. Transcoded Structures — Before and After Media in Abstraction. OSTEN Pavilion of the
- 2020. Back on Bornholm. Bornholm Kunstmuseum, Bornholm, Denmark (with catalog)
- 2023. New Mytho logy. Estonian National Museum (ERM), Tartu, Estonia (with catalog)

== Selected Group Exhibitions ==
Selected Group Exhibitions
- 1989. Exhibition of miniatures. Museum of Miniatures, Toronto, Canada
- 1991. Palace Bridge Museum, Leningrad, USSR
- 1992. Graphicon 92. Мoscow, Russia
- 1992. Antigraph. VDNKH, Moscow, Russia
- 1992. Palace Bridge Museum, Saint Petersburg, Russia
- 1993. Art Myth. First performance of Woe from Wit. Grand Manege, Moscow, Russia
- 1994. III Saint Petersburg Biennale, Manege, The Central Exhibition Hall, Saint Petersburg, Russia
- 1994. Renaissance and Resistance. The State Russian Museum, Saint Petersburg, Russia
- 1994. Self-identification. Kiel, Berlin, Oslo, Sopot, Saint Petersburg, Copenhagen
- 1995. The Passion of Luka, SCCA Annual Exhibition, Marble Palace, The State Russian Museum, Saint Petersburg, Russia
- 1995. The Third Reality, International Forum of computer art. Saint Petersburg, Russia
- 1995. Kwangju Biennale, Kwangju, South Korea, Audience Sympathy Award
- 1995. Videovision festival and SCARP exhibition. Planetarium, Saint Petersburg, Russia
- 1996. Saint Petersburg — 1995. Manege, The Central Exhibition Hall, Saint Petersburg, Russia
- 1996. Photobiennale 96. Grand Manege, Moscow, Russia
- 1996. The Department of Contemporary Art: First Five Years. Benois Wing, The State Russian Museum, Saint Petersburg, Russia
- 1996. Museum of the New Academy. Reserve Palace, Tsarskoye Selo, Saint Petersburg, Russia
- 1996. CONCEPT, International Exhibition of Contemporary Photography. Zagreb, Croatia
- 1996. Idylle und Katastrophe. Erfurt, Germany
- 1996. Trends and Photography. Small Manege, Moscow, Russia
- 1996. Interaction: Chance Visions, SCCA Annual Exhibition. Saint Petersburg, Russia
- 1996. Metaphern des Entrucktseins. Badischer Kunstverein, Karlsruhe, Germany
- 1997. Family Portrait, within Months of Photography. St. Paul's Cathedral, Bratislava, Slovakia.
- 1997. The State Russian Museum, Saint Petersburg, Russia
- 1997. Alternative Museum, together with Brian Eno's installation «The Light», Marble Palace,
- 1997. Last Five Years. The State Russian Museum, Saint Petersburg, Russia
- 1997. Neoacademism. The State Museum «Pavlovsk», Saint Petersburg, Russia
- 1997. New Russian Classicism, special project within Art Manege, Moscow, Russia
- 1997. The Cabinet. New Russian Classicism. Stedelijk Museum, Amsterdam, Netherlands
- 1998. Unintentional Sinners. Publishing house «Arguments and Facts», Moscow, Russia
- 1998. Photography from Saint Petersburg, Centre of Photography, Turku, Finland
- 1998. Aufbruch, Die Neue Russische Fotografie. Erholungshaus der Bayer AG, Leverkusen, Germany
- 1998. Best European Digital Photo, Museum Griffelkunst, Hamburg, Germany
- 1998. II International Photobiennale. Moscow, Russia
- 1998. The Break. New Russian Photography. Cologne, Germany
- 1998. Photography from Sain Petersburg. Praha, Czech Republic
- 1998. Family Portrait. NYC ACM SIGGRAPH, New York, United States
- 1998. Neoakademiska photo. Arzemju Makslas Musejs, Riga, Latvia
- 1999. Fauna. National Center of Contemporary Art (NCCA), Moscow, Russia
- 1999. Kunst & Computer. Altonaer Museum, Hamburg, Germany
- 1999. Photo Festival in Nice. Photo Centre, Nice, France
- 1999. After the Wall. Modern Art Museum, Stockholm, Sweden
- 1999. Heaven. Düsseldorf Kunsthalle, Düsseldorf, Germany
- 1999. Classicism Today. Ostende Museum, Belgium
- 1999. Heaven. Tate Liverpool, Liverpool, United Kingdom
- 2000. «Contemporary Art in the Traditional Museum» Festival, «Quiet Life» project. Stieglitz Museum, Saint Petersburg, Russia
- 2000. Museum named Surikov, Kemerovo Regional Museum of Fine Arts, Novosibirsk State Art Museum, Russia
- 2000. Space of Tradition, travelling exhibition. Tomsk Museum of Fine Arts, Krasnoyarsk Art
- 2000. Millenium. Tauride Palace and Diaghilev Art Center, Saint Petersburg, Russia
- 2000. Grani, Russian Short Film Festival, Kurgan Regional Museum, Kurgan, Russia
- 2000. Art 2000. New Kunst from Moscow, Saint Petersburg, Kiev. Kunstverein Rosenheim, Rosenheim, Germany
- 2000. Artistic will. One hundred years of struggle in art. Kshesinskaya Palace, Saint Petersburg, Russia
- 2000. Odysseus, traveling exhibition. Norwegian museums
- 2000. Art Forum. Berlin, Germany
- 2000. The Heirs of Sparta, New Russian Classicism. Sinebrychoff Art Museum, Helsinki, Finland
- 2000. Russisk Neoakademisme. Bornholm Kunstmuseum, Bornholm, Denmark
- 2001. Out of control. Central House of Artists, Moscow, Russia
- 2001. Russisk Neoakademisme. Kunstmuseum, Rotterdam, Netherlands
- 2001. Grani, travelling exhibition. National Centre of Contemporary Art, Nizhnii Novgorod, Kirov, Yoshkar-Ola, Izhevsk, Russia
- 2001. Sybaris. Baltic Contemporary Art Biennale
- 2001. Rotterdam 2001 — Saint Petersburg 2003. Gallery Koffie Verkeert, Rotterdam, Netherlands
- 2001. Beauty & Erotism. Gasunie Foundation, Groningen, Netherlands
- 2001. Abstraction in Russia. The State Russian Museum, Saint Petersburg, Russia
- 2001. Kunst from Saint Petersburg. Museum of Contemporary Art, Tallinn, Estonia
- 2002. Russian Art in XX—XXI centuries, travelling exhibition. Krasnoyarsk, Nizhnii Novgorod, Tolyatti
- 2002. Photobiennale. The Grand Manege, Moscow, Russia
- 2002. She Art, The State Tretyakov Gallery, Moscow, Russia
- 2002. Snowgirl. Zacheta National Gallery, Warshawa and National Centre of Contemporary Arts, Moscow, Russia
- 2002. Die Griechische Klassik idee oder Wirklichkeit. Martin-Gropius-Bau, Berlin
- 2002. Artist of Ideal. Palazzo Forti, Verona, Italy
- 2002. Doll's House. Henie Onstad Art Center, Oslo, Norway
- 2002. Russian Symbolism. Ludwig Museum, Koblenz, Germany
- 2002. Emperor and Galilean, special project within Art Moscow. Central House of Artists, Moscow, Russia
- 2003. Emperor and Galilean. Henie Onstad Kunstsenter, Oslo, Norway
- 2003. The Rave in Europe, together with Georgy Gurianov. Luke&A Gallery, London, United Kingdom
- 2003. Beautiful and ugly. Olga Tobreluts and Hermann Nitsch. Long&Ryle Gallery, London, United Kingdom
- 2003. Touch me. Anna Akhmatova's Museum, Saint Petersburg, Russia
- 2003. Imagerie Art Fashion. Museum Revoltella, Italy
- 2003. D’Apres ‒ Da Anzinger a Warhol. Galleria GAS, Bologna, Italy
- 2003. Neue Ansatze. Düsseldorf, Kunsthalle, Germany
- 2003. Collection Ludwig Museum in the Russian State Museum, Saint Petersburg, Russia
- 2003. Eva, Venus, Madonna. Gemeente Maasmechelen, Belgium
- 2003. The Fourth Sex: Extreme Territory of Adolescence. Stazione Leopolda, Florence, Italy, curated by Franchesco Bonami and Ralf Simons
- 2003. Foreign Visions. Löwenpalais, Berlin, Germany and Museum Contemporary Art, Skopie, Republic of North Macedonia
- 2003. Photographic Print Exposition, Los Angeles, United States
- 2003. Sacred Figures project, within Photo Los Angeles, The XII International Los Angeles
- 2004. «TRANSVERSALISTES RUSSES». Orel Art Gallery, Paris, France
- 2004. «54 International», Palazzo Pretura, Italy
- 2004. ...And woman created man. Espace Paris Jeunes Belleville, Paris, France, curated by Francis Parent
- 2004. Art and Geography. The National Museum of Art, Oslo, Norway
- 2004. Ideal and Reality. GAS Galleria, Bologna, Italy
- 2004. Ekaterina. Bonn Women's Museum, Bonn, Germany
- 2004. Il Nudo. Galleria Arte Moderna, Bologna, Italy, curated by Peter Weermaer
- 2004. Photobiennale. Moscow Museum of Contemporary Art (MMOMA), Moscow, Russia
- 2004. Kandinsky e la anima Russia. Galleria d’Arte Moderna, Palazzo Forti, Verona, Italy
- 2004. Days of Flight. 100 paintings from the State Tretyakov Gallery, Yaroslavl Art Museum, Yaroslavl, Russia
- 2004. La creazione ansiosa. De Picasso a Bacon, Palazzo Forti, Verona, Italy
- 2004. Gods becoming Men. Frissiras Museum, Athens, Greece, curated by Edward Lucie-Smith
- 2005. III Biennale of Graphics. Kaliningrad, Russia
- 2005. Europalia Russia. Brussels, Belgium
- 2005. Altre Lilith. Scuderie Aldobrandini, Frascati, Italy
- 2006. Changes in Modern European Photography. GAS Galleria, Bologna, Italy, curated by Peter Weermaer
- 2006. Photobiennale. The Grand Manege, Moscow, Russia
- 2006. Let There Be Video. Russian video Art, 1996–2006. Central House of Artists, Moscow, Russia
- 2006. Sence of Life — Sence of Art. The State Russian Museum, Saint Petersburg, Russia
- 2007. Storytellers. The Kremlin Museum, Nizhniy Novgorod, Russia
- 2007. Adventures of the Black Square. The State Russian Museum, Saint Petersburg, Russia
- 2007. The Archive of Perestrojka Art. Museum of Contemporary Art, Kiasma, Finland
- 2007. Tarquin and Lucretia. Guillon International Video Art Festival, Guillon, France
- 2007. History of Russian Video Art. Moscow Museum of Contemporary Art (MMOMA), Moscow, Russia
- 2008. The Painting. Triumph Gallery, Moscow, Russia
- 2009. The Rage, within presentation of Andrei Haas's book «The Rage». Globus Gallery, Saint Petersburg, Russia
- 2009. Exhibition of the Kandinsky Art Award Nominees. First presentation of the Caucaus Prisoner project. Central House of the Artists, Moscow, Russia
- 2010. History of Russian Video Art. Volume 2. Moscow Museum of Contemporary Art (MMOMA), Moscow, Russia
- 2010. Zen d’Art. Moscow Museum of Contemporary Art (MMOMA), Moscow, Russia
- 2011. Two ways of Oscar Gustave Rejlander's life. Garage Museum of Contemporary Art, Moscow, Russia
- 2011. New Academy. Saint Petersburg. The Ekaterina Cultural Foundation, Moscow, Russia
- 2014. Russia Playing the Circus. Moscow Museum of Modern Art, Moscow, Russia
- 2014. Reconstruction 2. The Ekaterina Cultural Foundation, Moscow, Russia
- 2014. Other Capital. Museum of Moscow, Moscow, Russia
- 2014. Russia Artists for the Centre «Anton’s Right Here». Aslan Chekhoyev New Museum, Saint Petersburg, Russia
- 2014. Terror and Culture & Newer New, projects within IV Baltic Biennale. Aslan Chekhoyev New Museum, Saint Petersburg, Russia
- 2015. Absolute Beauty — Neoacademism in Saint Petersburg. Ludwig Museum, Budapest, Hungary
- 2019. The Circus. State Russian Museum, Saint Petersburg, Russia
- 2019. Artists on the Dancefloor. Sergey Kuryokhin Contemporary Art Center, Saint Petersburg, Russia
- 2019. «Ludwig 30». Ludwig Museum, Budapest, Hungary
- 2019. Disturbing Narratives. The Parkview Museum, Beijing-Singapore, curated by Dr. Lorand Hegyi Abstraction in Avangard. Sergey Kuryokhin Contemporary Art Center, Saint Petersburg, Russia
- 2020. Artists on the Dancefloor. Yeltsin Center, Ekaterinburg, Russia
- 2020. Sergey Kuryokhin Contemporary Art Center, Saint Petersburg, Russia
- 2020. A History of the Development of Media Art in Leningrad — Saint Petersburg. 1985–2000.
- 2020. Russian Fairytales. State Tretyakov Gallery, Moscow, Russia
- 2021. The Day After. Herman Otto Museum, Miskolc, Hungary and Sergey Kuryokhin Contemporary Art Center, Saint Petersburg, Russia
- 2022. The Great Emptiness. Ruarts Foundation, Moscow, Russia
- 2022. Named Vasari. Revival. Branch of Pushkin State Museum of Fine Arts in Arsenal, Nizhnii Novgorod, Russia
- 2022. Genrich Semiradskii. Following the Gods. State Tretyakov Gallery, Moscow, Russia

== Filmography ==
- 1989. «Violet Birds», 30’
- 1990. «Laboratory Searches», 10'
- 1993. «Woe from Wit», 13'
- 1995. «Sea Breathing», видеоинсталляция, 4 hours
- 1995. «Eternal Music», 15"
- 1995. «Last Labour of Hercules», 5'
- 1995. «In Anticipation of War» 1'
- 1996. «Odisseus» 1'
- 1997. «Manifest of Neoakademism» 7'
- 1998. «Love story of Merilyn Monroe and Vladimir Mayakovsky», 9'
- 1999–2000. Stychograms «I Hear a Color and See a Sound»
- 1999–2000. Video installation «East — West» 30’
- 2000. «Dream of Alexander the Great»
- 2002. «Rapture of Ekaterina», 1'
- 2004. Video installation «Replacement», within «Tarquin and Lucretia» project, 15’
- 2005–2006. Video installation «Thin Factor» within «Caucasian Prisoner» project
- 2008–2009. Video installation «Buttle with Fenrir»
