= Sergey Kuryokhin =

Russian musician (1954–1996)

Sergey Anatolyevich Kuryokhin
- Сергей Анатольевич Курёхин
- Born: June 16, 1954; Murmansk, Russian SFSR, Soviet Union (present-day Russia)
- Died: July 9, 1996 (aged 42); Saint Petersburg, Russia
- Occupations: Pianist, composer, actor, music producer, experimental artist
- Spouse: Anastasia Kuryokhina (m. 1981)
- Children: 3

Sergey Anatolyevich Kuryokhin (Note: Russian: Сергей Анатольевич Курёхин, romanized: Sergey Anatolyevich Kuryokhin) (16 June 1954 – 9 July 1996, nicknamed The Captain) was a Russian composer, pianist, music director, experimental artist, film actor and writer, based in St. Petersburg, Russia. He was an influential figure in the Saint Petersburg music scene of the 1980s and early 1990s. He was the former keyboardist for the rock band Aquarium.

== Biography ==
=== Early life ===
Sergey Kuryokhin was born in Murmansk into a military family. He began piano lessons at the age of 4. His school years were spent in Evpatoria, Crimea. His family moved to Leningrad in 1971 following his high-school graduation. He was admitted to the Mussorgsky Music School at the Leningrad Conservatory, but was expelled soon after for chronic absenteeism.

=== Career ===
Kuryokhin began his performing career as a piano and keyboard player with a school band in Leningrad. After playing with professional jazz bands, as well as popular rock musicians, Kuryokhin went through several stages in his career and eventually became one of the most recognisable names and faces in Russia during the 1980s and 1990s.

By the end of his life, he had emerged as an avant-garde film composer, performance artist, and film actor. Outside Russia, he is primarily known as a jazz and experimental musician, through his works released since 1981 on UK's Leo Records, as well as his concert tours with Pop-Mechanics. He also contributed to several Aquarium albums, including Triangle, Taboo, and Radio Africa, and was also a frequent collaborator to the band Strannye Igry.

In 1986, Kuryokhin and others from the St. Petersburg musical scene were featured in the PBS documentary "Comrades III: All That Jazz". Scenes featuring Kuryokhin from this documentary were featured in Adam Curtis' 2022 documentary "TraumaZone".

His work in film includes starring in and composing music for Two Captains 2, a comedic pseudo-documentary about World War I, composing the soundtrack to the neo-noir Russian horror film Mister Designer, and playing the lead role in Dude - Water Winner.

Kuryokhin shot to fame after creating one of the first popular media viruses in the Russian media. As a guest on the popular talk show Fifth Wheel, Kuryokhin provided "proof" that Lenin was a mushroom. This semi-improvised satirical act of performance art was broadcast live on Russian television in May 1991.

During the 1990s, Kuryokhin was a board member of the St. Petersburg City Council for Culture and Tourism. In 1995 Kuryokhin joined the National Bolshevik Party.

In 1996, Kuryokhin founded the record label Long Arms Records (Длинные Руки Рекордс) alongside Nick Dmitriev (1955–2004). Following Kuryokhin's death, a commemorative live album Without Kuryokhin by Kenny Millions and Otomo Yoshihide was released on this label.

=== Death ===
He died of a rare heart condition, cardiac sarcoma, aged 42 in 1996.

== Personal life ==
Kuryokhin was married twice. His first marriage in 1972, which bore him a daughter, lasted only a few years. In 1982, he met Anastasia ("Nastia"), a student at the Faculty of Geography of Leningrad State University. In 1984 they had a daughter, Elizaveta, and in 1994, their son Fyodor.

Elizaveta Kuryokhina died in 1998, at the age of 14 after an overdose of sleeping pills. She is laid to rest near her father in Komarovo Cemetery, St. Petersburg.

== Legacy ==
The Saint Petersburg Annual International Music Festival SKIF (Sergey Kuriokhin International Festival) is named after him. Kuryokhin festivals annually take place in Berlin, Amsterdam, and New York.

In 2004, the Sergey Kuryokhin Foundation and the Kuryokhin Center were founded. The foundation collects information about Kuryokhin and the Center organises events in the spirit of the artist. Both are located in the same building, an old cinema in Saint Petersburg. In 2009, the Sergey Kuryokhin Foundation and the Kuryokhin Center established the Sergey Kuryokhin Contemporary Art Award.

== Discography ==
- The Ways of Freedom (Leo Records, 1981)
- Tragedy in Rock (1988)
- Mr. Designer (1989)
- Popular Science (1989) with Henry Kaiser
- Album for Children (1991)
- Opera for the Rich (1991)
- Some combinations of fingers and passion (1991)
- Sparrow Oratorium/Four Seasons (1994)
- Friends Afar (Sound Wave Records, 1996) with Kenny Millions
- Dear John Cage (Long Arm Records, 1996) with Kenny Millions
- 2 For Tea (Long Arms Records, 1998) with David Moss

== Other works ==
- Music for the stage production of the Chekhov's The Seagull (1994)
- Music for the Russian TV series Anna Karenina (2007)

Also wrote Title Music for entire BBC TV series Comrades 1985 one episode of which featured him and other Leningrad Musicians and his Orchestra Popular mechanics

- Mister Designer (1988)
- Buster's Bedroom (1990)
- Leading role as Pavel Gorelikov in Dude — Water Winner (1991)

Kuryokhin is also featured in the music video for Joanna Stingray's "Feeling", as well as in the music video for "Metamorphoses" by Russian band Strannye Igry.

== See also ==
- Without Kuryokhin, an album by Kenny Millions and Otomo Yoshihide dedicated to the memory of Sergey.
