= Nõmmküla, Saare County =

Village in Estonia

Coordinates: 58°40′23″N 23°11′43″E

Nõmmküla
- Village
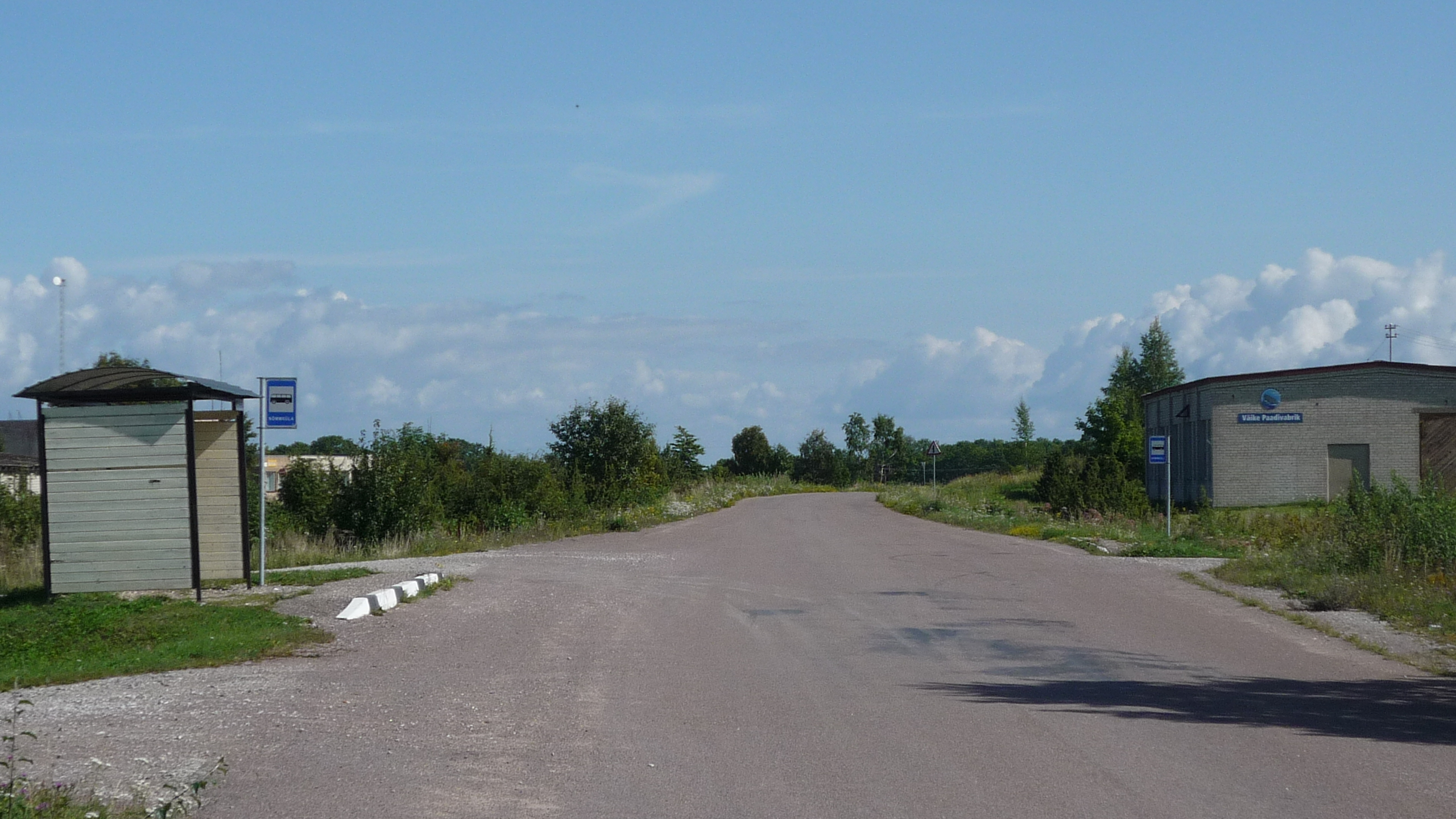
- Nõmmküla bus stop
- Interactive map of Nõmmküla
- Country: Estonia
- County: Saare County
- Parish: Muhu Parish
- Time zone: UTC+2 (EET)
  - Summer (DST): UTC+3 (EEST)

Nõmmküla is a village in Muhu Parish, Saare County in western Estonia.

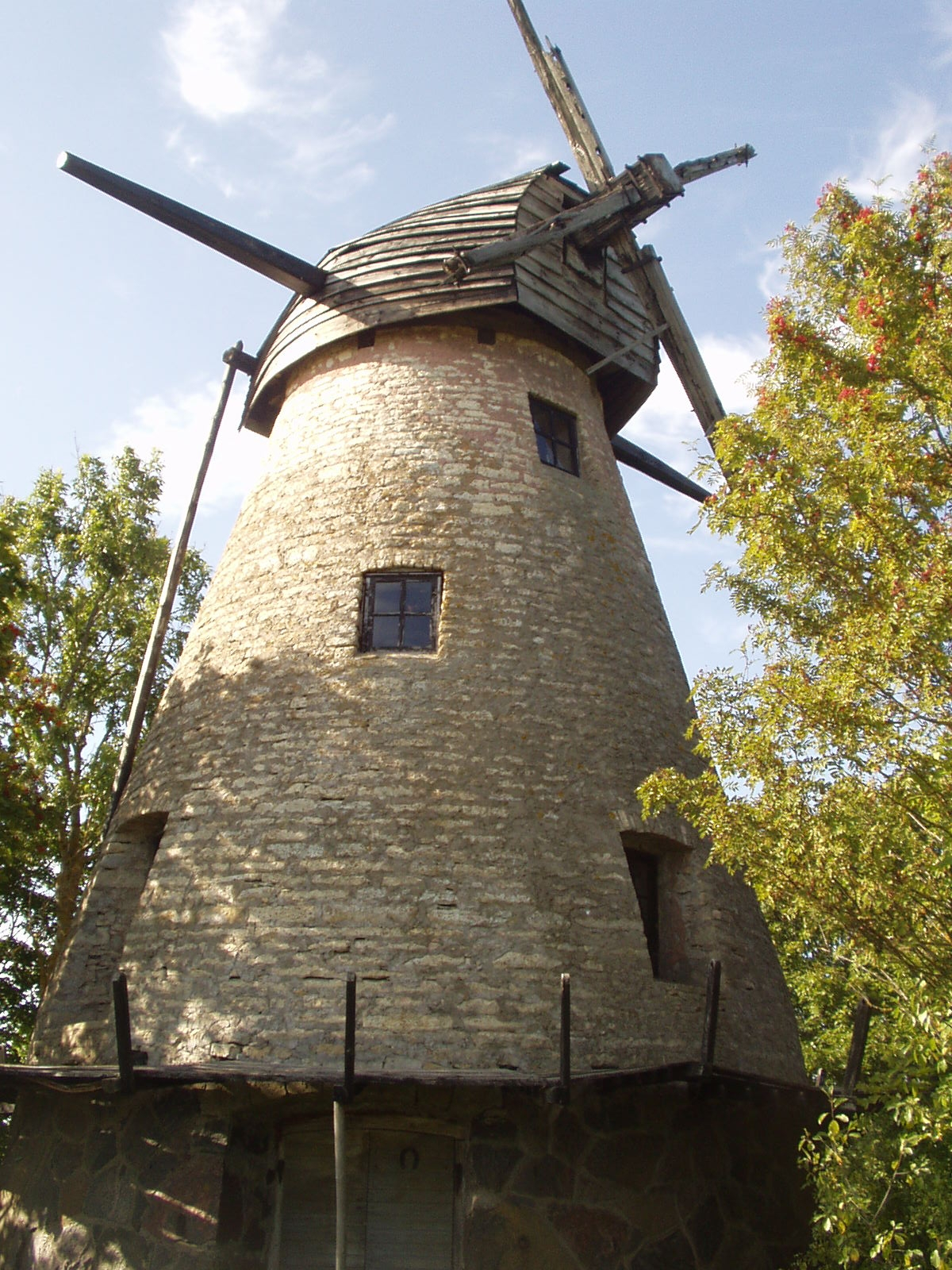
Uuetalu windmill in Nõmmküla.
