= Elektropartizany =

Russian anarcho-punk-rock band

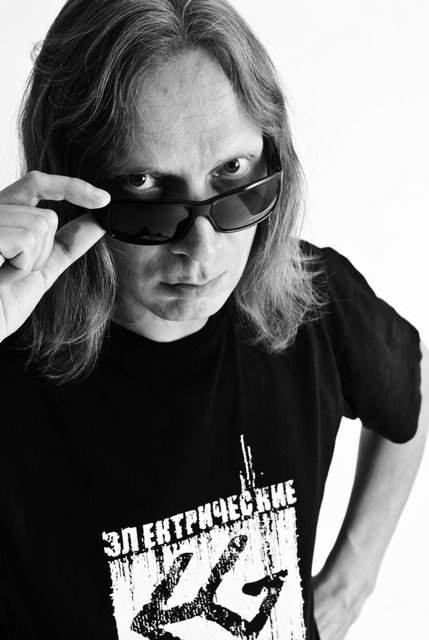
- Vadim Kurilyov, the leader and song-writer

Background information
- Also known as: Electropartisans, Elektricheskie Partizany
- Origin: Saint Petersburg, Russia
- Genres: Rock, Punk rock
- Years active: 2004–present
- Members: Vadim Kurilyov (vocal, guitar, bass); Mikhail Nefyodov (drums); Dmitry Kovalev (guitar); Pavel Borisov (bass); Dmitry Drumov (bass); Sergey Letov (saxophone)
- Website: http://electropartisan.com/

Elektropartizany (Electropartisans; Russian: Электропартизаны) is an anarcho-punk rock band from Saint Petersburg, Russia. It was founded in 2004 by Vadim Kurilyov and Mikhail Nefyodov after they left the bands DDT and Alisa.

== Members ==
- Vadim Kurilyov (vocal, guitar, bass)
- Mikhail Nefyodov (drums)
- Dmitry Kovalev (guitar)
- Pavel Borisov (bass)
- Dmitry Drumov (bass)
- Sergey Letov (saxophone)

== Discography ==
=== Studio albums ===
Transliterated title	Original title	Translation	Year of release	Notes
Ingermanlandiya	Ингерманландия	Ingermanland	2005	
Kontakt	Контакт	Contact	2007	
Dzen-Anarkhiya	Дзен-Анархия	Zen-Anarchy	2009	
Vek nespokoynogo Solntsa	Век неспокойного Солнца	The Age of the Turbulent Sun	2010	
R.V.I.	Р.В.И.	R.V.I.	2011	In Russian Р.В.И./R.V.I. is acronym of Libertarian Republic of Ingria
Chyorny Protuberanets, ili Nam nuzhna Anarkhiya	Черный протуберанец, или Нам нужна Анархия	Black Protuberance, or We Need Anarchy	2012	

=== Compilations ===
Transliterated title	Original title	Translation	Year of release	Notes
The Best I. Psikhogerilia	The Best I. Психогерилья	The Best I. Psychoguerrilla	2013	Internet mp3 release
The Best II. Podzemnoe vremia	The Best II. Подземное время	The Best II. Subterranean Time	2013	Internet mp3 release
The Best III. Fuck the System Jazz	The Best III. Fuck the System Jazz	The Best II. Fuck the System Jazz	2013	Internet mp3 release

== Videography ==
- «Р.В.И Систему!» (DVD-single, 2013)
