= DK (band) =

Soviet-Russian underground rock band

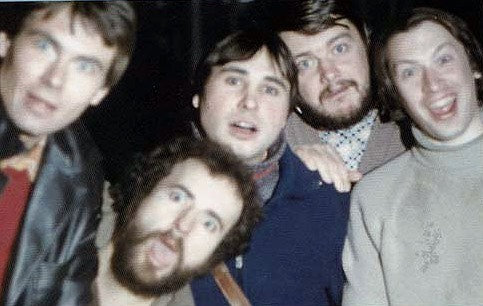

Background information
- Origin: Moscow, USSR (now Russia)
- Genres: Experimental rock; avant-garde; punk rock; art punk; free jazz; lo-fi music
- Years active: 1980–1990 (Reunion: 2001)
- Members: Sergey Zharikov; Dmitry Yanshin; Igor Belov; Sergey Letov; Alexander Belonosov; Sergey Polyansky
- Past members: Evgeny Morozov; Victor Klemeshov; Oleg Opoitsev; Oleg Andreev; Alexander F. Sklyar; Alexei Vishnya etc

DK (Russian: ДК) was a cult Soviet underground rock band founded in Moscow in 1980 by its drummer and leader Sergey Zharikov. It was one of the first Soviet and Russian experimental rock bands. DK was known for the dirty art punk style, sound that combined blues rock, free jazz and RIO, and their scandalous satirical anti-Soviet creativity. The band released about 40 albums from 1980 to 1990. DK was one of the most influential bands in USSR, influencing Soviet and Russian bands such as Grazhdanskaya Oborona, Sektor Gaza, Mongol Shuudan, and Dna Error.

== History ==
Sergey Zharikov thought about creating his own rock band in 1979, after he returned from the army.

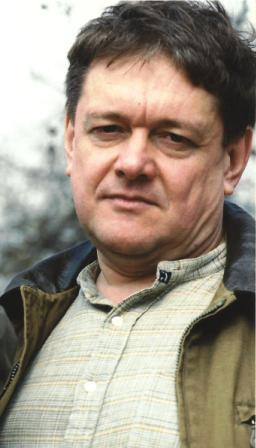
Sergey Zharikov, band leader, lyricist, songwriter, drummer and ideologist

During the ten years of its existence, the band went through a few lineups, and only the drummer Sergey Zharikov remained a constant member of the band. He was also the author of the lyrics and music. The first album was recorded in the basement of a Moscow hostel on tape. The first vocalist was the singer Evgeny Morozov, a graduate of the Gnesin school of music. In 1984, Morozov was jailed for speculation. Dmitry Yashin was one of the co-founders of the group and almost a permanent member of staff. He was the lead guitarist in DK from 1981 to 1985 and from about 1987 to 1989. Yanshin was also the head of the folk-metal band "Vesyoliye Kartinki", in which some former members of DK played. Sergey Letov was a saxophonist of DK from 1984 to 1989. He also remastered some of DK's albums.

In 2001, DK held an official reunion concert for their 20th anniversary. The members and organizers of concert were vocalist Igor Belov, guitarist Dmitry Yashin, bassist Sergey Polyansky, keyboardist Alexander Belonosov, saxophonist Sergey Letov, and drummer Sergey Zharikov. The concert was attended by music critic Sergei Guriev, Siberian rock musician Nick Rock-n-Roll, and many others.

== Discography ==
- Goliye Nogi (1982, 1983)
- Lirika (1983, 1985)
- Desyatiy Molodezhniy Album (1983)
- Boga Net (1984)
- Kisilyov (1984)
- Malenkiy Prints (1984)
- Strizhenaya Umnaya Golovka (1984)
- Vtoroe Aprelya (1984)
- Snova Lyubov poselitsya (1984)
- DMB-85 (1985)
- Chashka Chaya (1986)
- Minnoe Pole im. 8 Marta (1986)
- Geenno-Ognennoe (1986)
- Neprestupnaya zabyvchivost' (1988)
- Chornaya Lentochka (1988)
- Zerkalo — dushi (1988)
- Tsvetochniy Korol (1989)
- Okkupatsiya (1989)
- V Gostyah U Veterana (1989)
- Pozhar V Mavzolee (1990)

=== Remastered compilation albums ===
- Semya Tsvetochnych Koroley (2001)
- Opera Magnum (2002)
- Mozart (2006)
- Strannye Igry Zapreschyonnoy Rock-Gruppy (S Orekhami I Vaflyami) (2006)
- Natsionalny Proyekt (2006)
- Tonkaya Efirnaya Substantsiya (2008)
- Eto Tvoya Rodina, Synok! (2008)
- Ti Stoyala U Morya (2008)
- Stereo (2008)
- Nashi i Vashi (2008)
- Povedenie V Bytu (2010)
