= Advent (film) =

2016 film directed by Roberto F. Canuto and Xu Xiaoxi

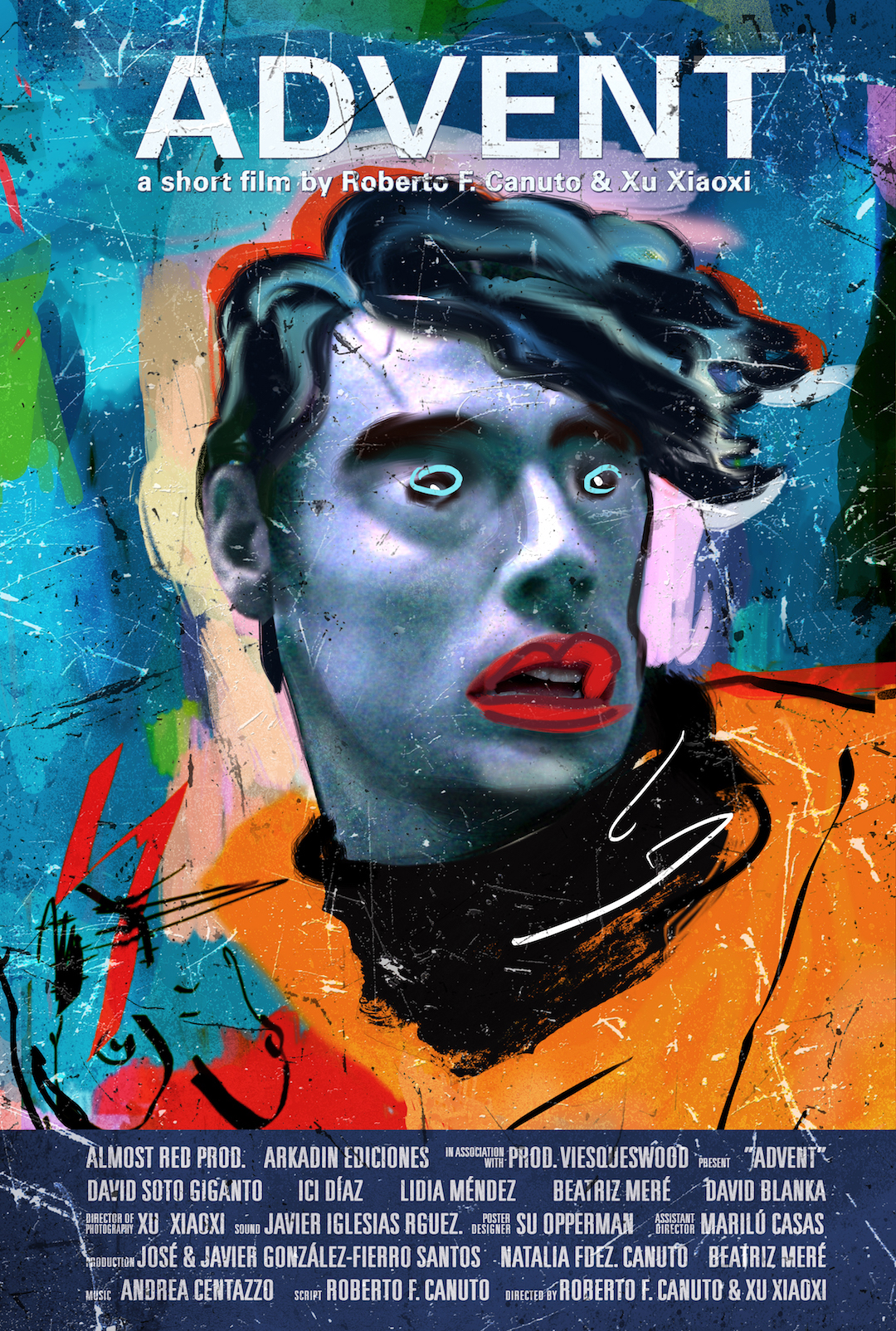
- Advent (Ad-vientu) English Poster
- Directed by: Roberto F. Canuto; Xu Xiaoxi
- Written by: Roberto F. Canuto
- Produced by: Jose González-Fierro Santos; Javier González-Fierro Santos; Natalia Fernández Canuto; Beatriz Meré
- Starring: David Soto Giganto; Ici Díaz; Lidia Méndez; David Blanka; Beatriz Meré
- Cinematography: Xu Xiaoxi
- Edited by: Roberto F. Canuto; Xu Xiaoxi
- Music by: Andrea Centazzo
- Production companies: Almost Red Productions; Arkadin Ediciones; Producciones Viesqueswood
- Release date: 25 November 2016 (Gijón International Film Festival)
- Running time: 20 minutes
- Countries: Spain; China
- Language: Asturian

Advent (Original Asturian Ad-vientu; Chinese: 等候; pinyin: Deng Hou; lit. 'waiting') is a 2016 Spanish and Chinese co-production psychological drama film, written and directed by Roberto F. Canuto and Xu Xiaoxi, and produced by the film company of the directors, Almost Red Productions, and Arkadin Ediciones in association with Producciones Viesqueswood.

The film represents the first movie of the directors filmed entirely in Spain and it is spoken in a local language, the Asturian language (something unusual in the Spanish cinema). It was shot in Asturias, with locations in the medieval center of the city of Avilés, the historical Cemetery La Carriona and some beaches and walkways of Carreño, mainly in Perlora and Xivares.

Advient is a psychological mystery drama film that tells the story of Suso, a dazed young unemployed man that tries to discover the identity of an unusual girl, whom he spies on a secluded beach, as she reminds him of his dead mother. She runs throwing herselfoff a cliff, but it will not be the last time that she crosses his path. The main character is performed by David Soto Giganto, an actor from the "Youth National Company of Classic Theater" and in the rest of the cast we find actors mainly from the "Dramatic Art Academy of Asturias", like Ici Díaz, o Beatriz Meré, together with other experienced actors as Lidia Méndez o David Blanka.

The music is composed by the italo-American master Andrea Centazzo, being Advent the sixth collaboration of the directors with the musician.

The world premiere of Advent took place at the 54th Gijón International Film Festival on 25 November 2016 and the film obtained the Audience Award Dia D'Asturies for Best Short Film. It will start the international festival circuit in 2017.

== Plot ==
A young and confused guy observes a strange lady on a secluded beach, since she reminds him of somebody from his past. The woman, after warning him about a danger, throw herself off of a cliff. Suso gets confused and tries to find support from a friend, but she doesn't understand him. When he visits his mother's grave, he meets the girl again. His confusion is made bigger by the effects of alcohol, but soon the truth will be revealed, that confronts him with his own identity and with his past.

== Cast ==
- David Soto Giganto as Suso
- Ici Díaz as Cova
- Lidia Méndez as Vicky
- David Blanka as Xuan
- Beatriz Meré as Pipi
- Leyre Fernández Castañón as Little Girl
- María de Los Casares as Xuan's friend
- Jose Manuel Monge García as Guy in the Street

== Production and Directors Commentary ==
Advent (Ad-vientu) is the first film shot in Spain by the directors, after their previous works in China (Floating Melon (2015), Ni Jing: Thou Shalt Not Steal (2013) and in the States (Desire Street, Toto Forever and Mei Mei). The production took place at the beginning of 2016 in Asturias and it had many limitations since it did not have any official subsidy. The postproduction start 18 January 2016 in China, with further collaborations with Asturias (regarding sound editing), the United States (music composition) and South Africa (graphic design). The main post-production process finishes in August 2016.

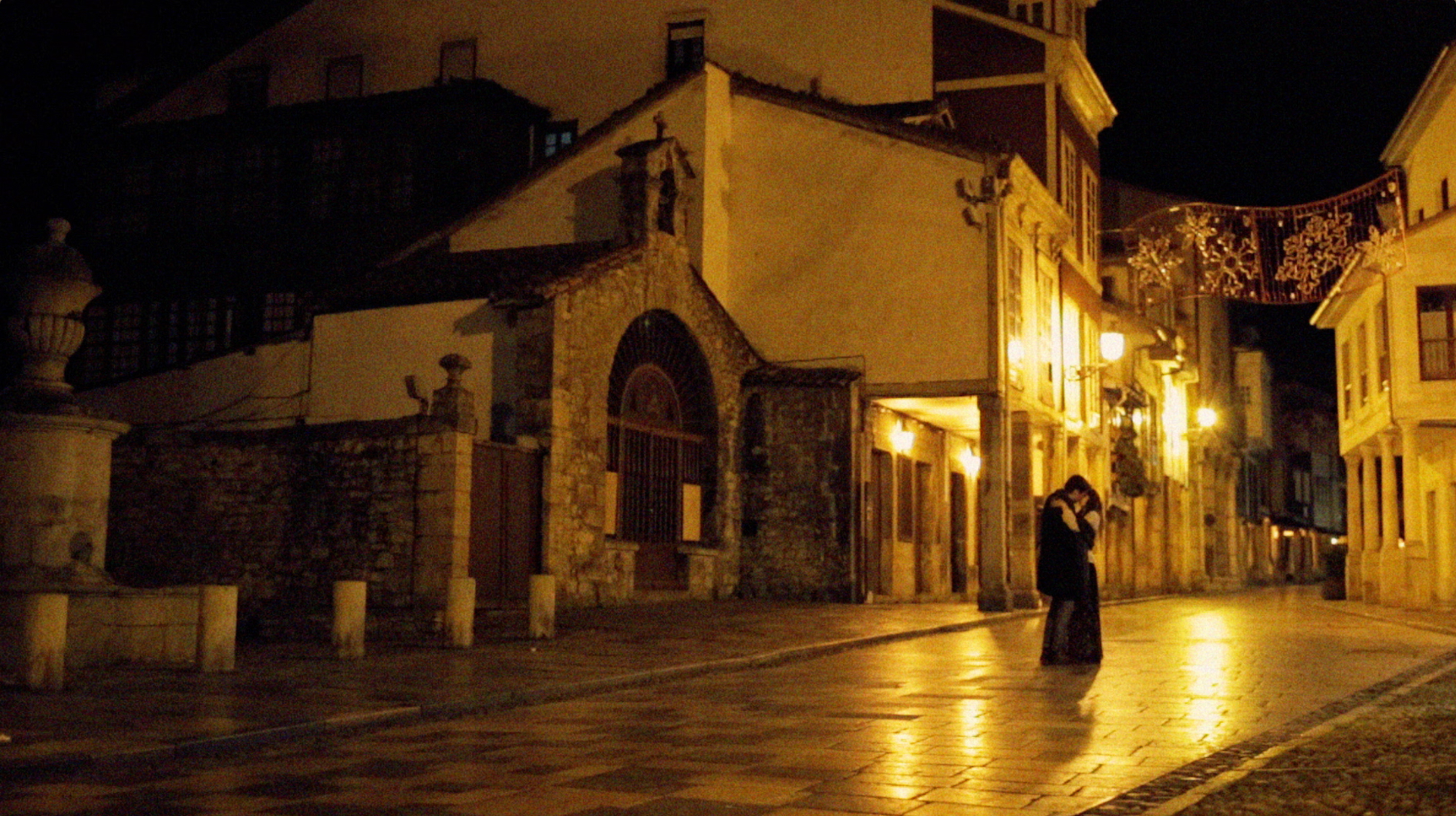
Scene of Advent (Ad-vientu) in Avilés, Asturias, with David Soto Giganto and Ici Diaz.

The director, Roberto F. Canuto, mention that the intention they had when they develop the story was that "the audience experience the emotions of the main character. For that reason we don't explain the past of the character and the reasons for the perturbed psychology of Suso, but we focus in the emotions, his status of mind in the present and his psychological drama as it happens in the film." We tried to portray the psychological drama that lives within the main character, who is facing the abyss due to the lack of social prospects and future, living a moment in which the ghosts of his past invade his mind. We touch an important and sensitive issue, the issue of suicide...Although we try to understand the psychology of someone in these circumstances, there will almost always be many aspects that escape our reasoning. Hence, we focus on the inner experience of the character, his feelings or lack of understanding and love in their childhood, and his personal environment. We decided to approach the character from the emotional point of view rather than rational. Look throughhis own eyes and feelings, going in depth into his inner world.

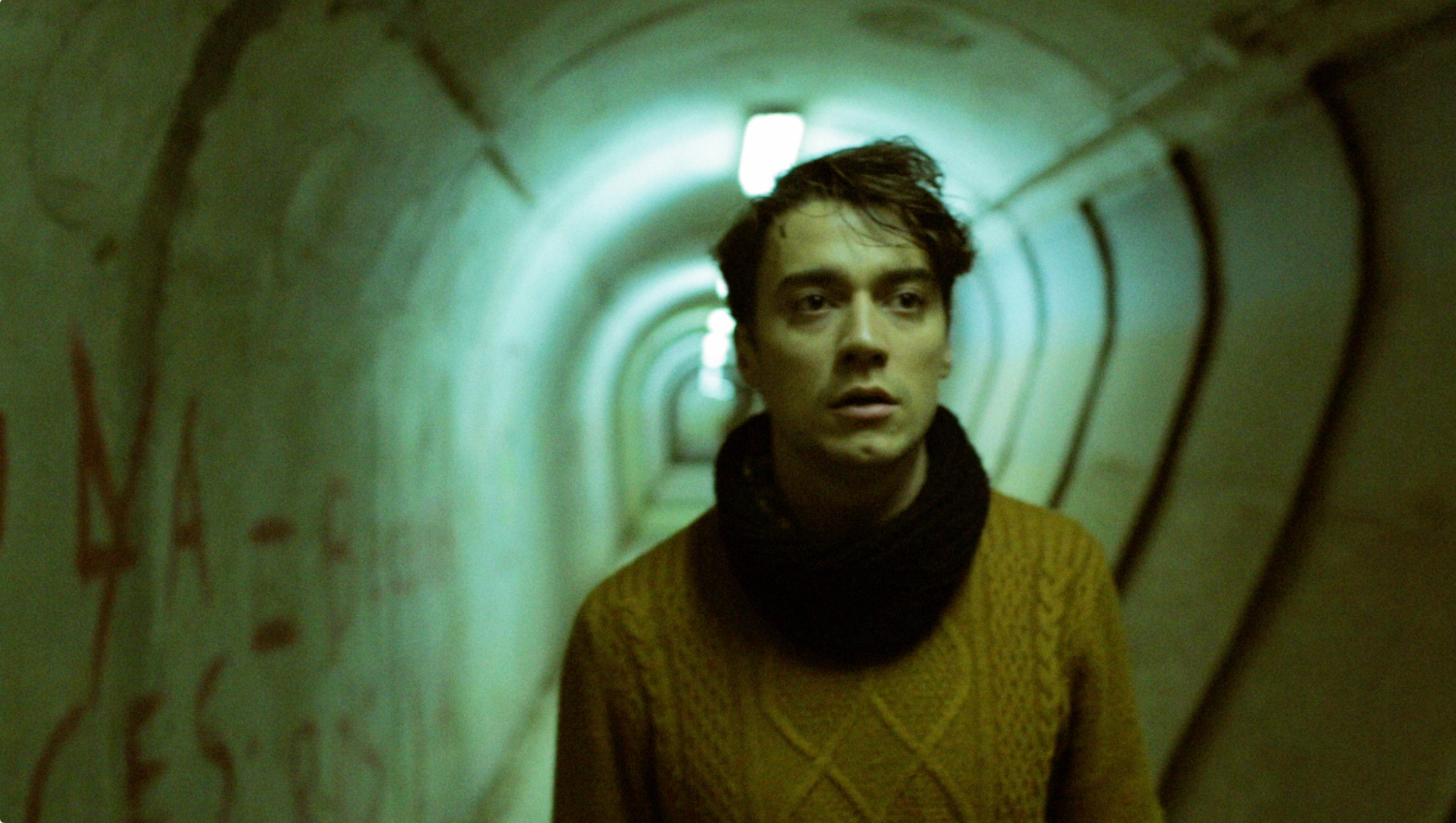
Picture of Advent (Ad-vientu) with David Soto Giganto.

The use of asturian language has a great significance in the film. According to the directors, "it is a language that needs to expand and get support to get the status of official language. The use of the language (devoid of a market accent), together with the poetic cinematography and a suggestive music, creates a very special atmosphere". The language helps to build the universe of the character, a world where the character is isolated and dreams with recover the happiness of his past.

The use of local minority languages is not new in the career of the directors. In their previous works, Ni Jing: Thou Shalt Not Steal (2013) and Floating Melon (2015), shot in China, they managed without the official Mandarin language to use the own dialect of the province of Sichuan, the Sichuanese Mandarin.

The title of the film has its etymological origin in the Latin "adventus" (arrival) and it was used in the old times to announce the arrival of an important character. In Spanish language "adviento" is used almost exclusively in a religious context, but in English language has the two meanings. To refer to the origin of the word, the original title of the film separates the Latin roots of the word (Ad-ventus).

One of the aspects remarkable in the films of the directors is the promotional materials. In the case of "Advent", the design of the poster, with vibrant colors and mix of textures (that reflect the atmosphere of the film), was carried out by the South African prestigious artist Su Opperman.

== Music ==
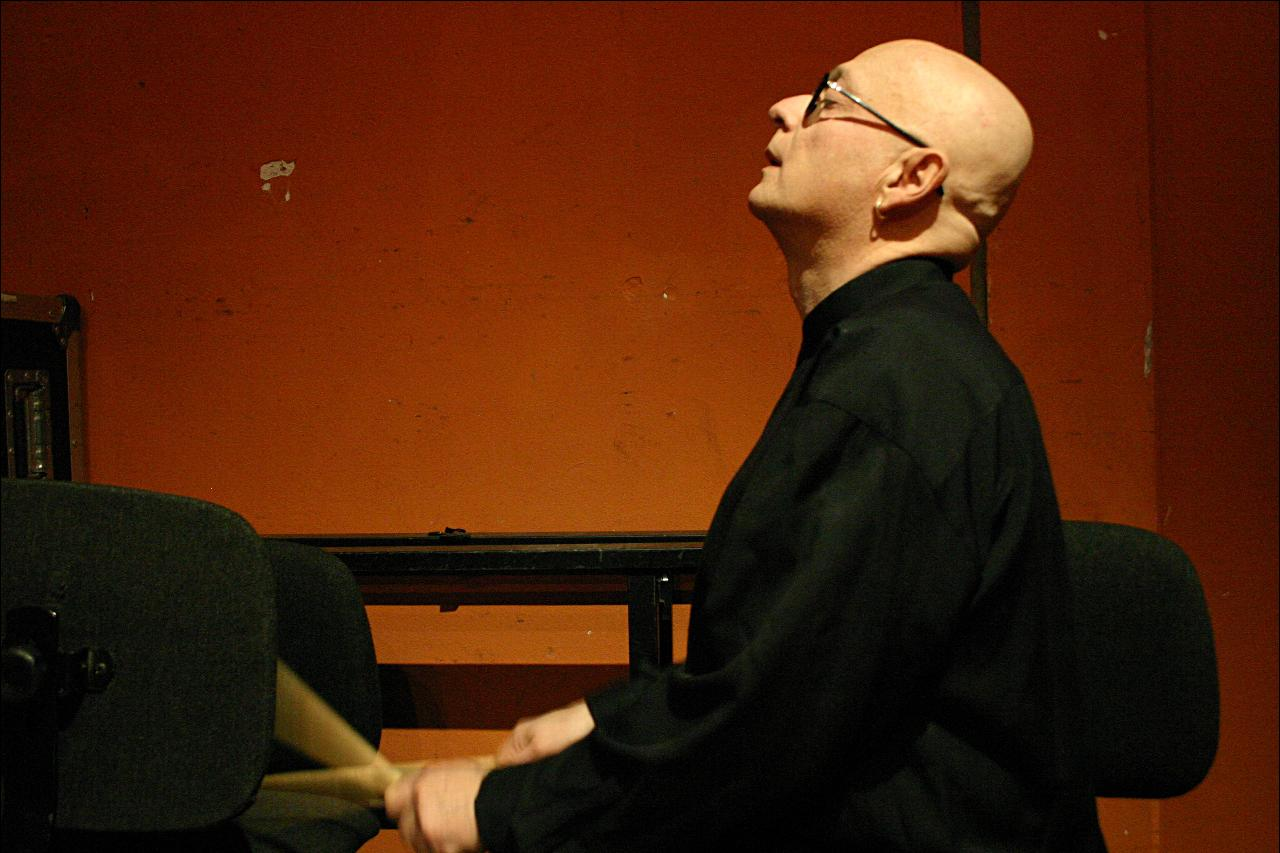
Andrea Centazzo, composer of Advent (Ad-vientu).

The author of the soundtrack is the Italian-American composer Andrea Centazzo, a regular collaborator of directors and multi-awarded author, also one of the masters of the avant-garde music. The music express the inner world of Suso, the main character of the film. In the soundtrack include incidental music and experimental compositions, together with some melodic cues, to produce a diversity of emotions parallel to the confusion of feelings of the main character. The collaboration between the directors and the composer started in 2008, Advent being the sixth collaboration, following Mei Mei, Toto Forever, Desire Street, Ni Jing: Thou Shalt Not Steal and Floating Melon.

== Reception ==
The film premiere at the 54th Gijón International Film Festival in Spain, on 25 November 2016. The reception was very positive and the film received many press coverage due to the expectation created a film in asturian language and co-directed by a Spaniard and a Chinese. Advent obtained in the festival the "Audience award Dia D'Asturies" for Best Short Film in a gala that took place at the "Teatro Jovellanos" of Gijón on 26 November 2016.

It is expected that the film start the international festival circuit in 2017.

== Awards and nominations ==
Won:

- Audience Award Dia d'Asturies for Best Short Film at the 54th Gijón International Film Festival 2016.
