= Floating Melon =

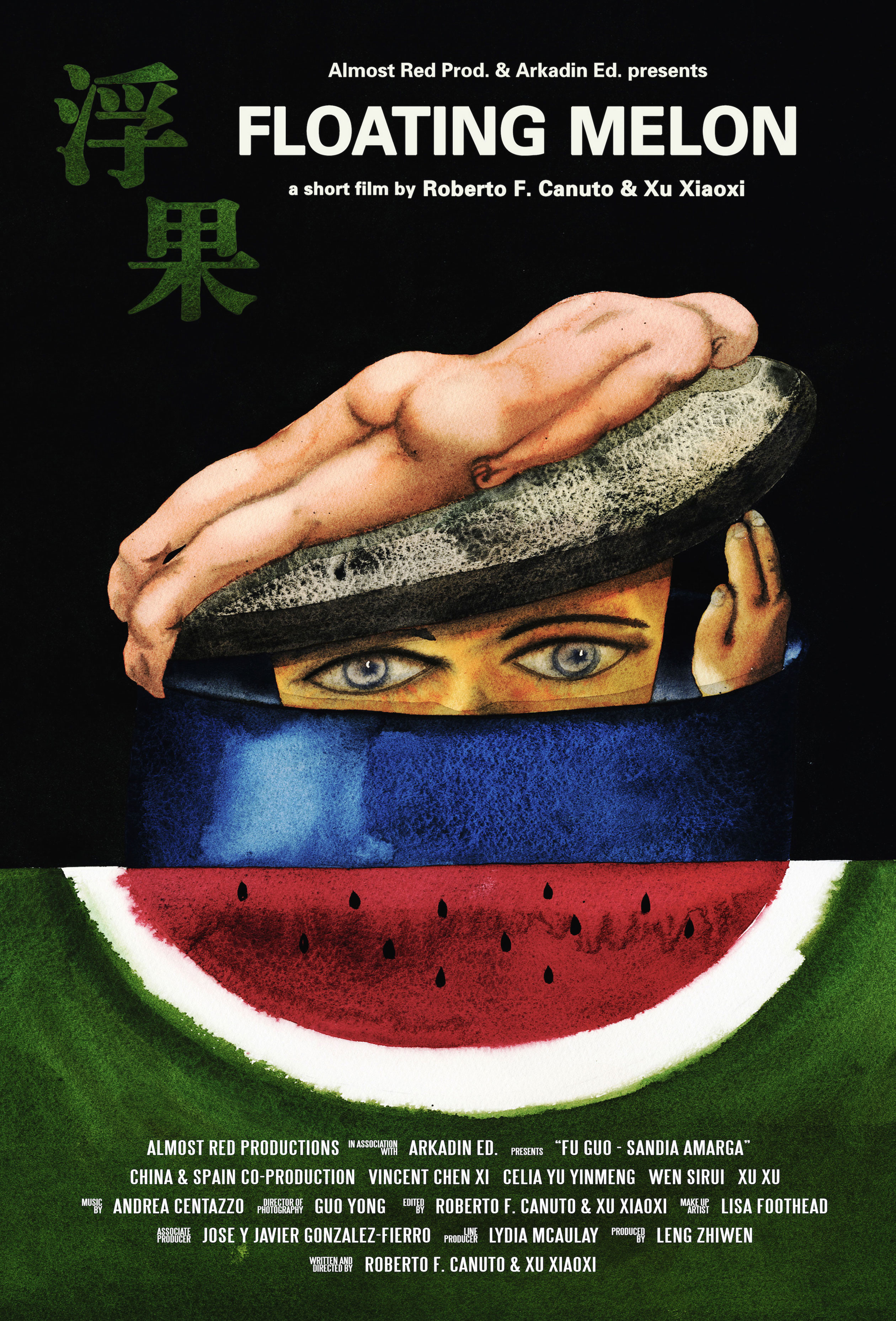
- Floating Melon (Fu Guo) English Poster
- Directed by: Roberto F. Canuto; Xu Xiaoxi
- Written by: Roberto F. Canuto; Xu Xiaoxi
- Produced by: Leng Zhiwen
- Starring: Vincent Chen Xi; Celia Yu Yinmeng; Wen Sirui; Xu Xu; Ariel Pei Zimu; Li Wen; Maggie Xue Zhu
- Cinematography: Guo Yong
- Edited by: Roberto F. Canuto; Xu Xiaoxi
- Music by: Andrea Centazzo
- Production company: Almost Red Productions
- Release date: 27 November 2015 (53 Gijón Int. Film Festival)
- Running time: 19 minutes
- Countries: China; Spain
- Languages: Mandarin; Sichuanese Dialect

Floating Melon (Original Chinese: 浮果; pinyin: Fu Guo; lit. 'floating fruit'; Spanish title Sandía amarga) is a 2015 Spanish and Chinese co-production drama film written and directed by Roberto F. Canuto and Xu Xiaoxi. It is a low budget independent short movie produced by Almost Red Productions (China) in association with Arkadín Ediciones (Spain). It was shot in Chengdu, using the local dialect of the region, the Sichuanese Mandarin.

The film has a strong film noir influences and represents the second part of the work Invisible Chengdu, a trilogy that focuses on characters that usually are kept underground and discriminated in the Chinese society and often not well represented in the silver screen. The first part is the film Ni Jing: Thou Shalt Not Steal (2013) and the last part Sunken Plum (to be released in 2017).

Floating Melon is performed by non professional actors and it includes themes very delicate, often censured in China, specially the representation of the homosexuality in young people, a community that need to protect themselves due to the lack of protective laws in the country. The story is partially based in true events, but the atmosphere is close to the Film Noir genre, to reflect the only situation where queer people can express themselves, community that needs to live in the shadows of the night in the Chinese society. It tells the story of Xiao Cheng, a young Chinese guy that ask for help to a friend to resolve a big trouble, the guy with whom he spend the afternoon is dead on his bed from the effect of a drug, not something the Chinese authorities look kindly on.

The film premiered in Spain at the 53rd FICXIXON, Gijón International Film Festival in November 2015 and in China at the Art Gallery Shujingtang Alley Art Space in Chengdu (Sichuan) in June 2016. It received an Audience Award at the 15th Avilés Acción Film Festival (Spain) and the Audience Choice Award and Best Cinematography Award (Guo Yong) at the III Asturian Film Festival of Proaza 2016 (Spain). In the first 12 months after the release it has been presented in over 40 international film festivals in Europe, America, Asia and Africa.

== Plot ==
For the young Xiao Cheng (Vincent Cheng Xi), what supposes to be a perfect night becomes a nightmare. His lover, Kwan Ming (Xu Xu) seems dead after a lethal drug reaction. In the dark roads of Chengdu, Xiao Cheng, scared of the consequences, send a message asking for help to his friend Fiona (Wen Sirui). She comes to meet him with her girlfriend Lola (Celia Yu Yunmeng), that doesn't want to get involve with the problem. Fiona thinks that the best solution is to hide the body, but when they return to the apartment, they found the unexpected.

== Cast ==
- Vincent Chen Xi (Chinese: 陈熙) as Cheng Xi
- Celia Yu Yinmeng (Chinese: 余吟萌) as Lola Liu
- Wen Sirui (Chinese: 文思睿) as Fiona Wu
- Xu Xu (Chinese: 徐徐) as Kwan Ming
- Ariel Pei Zimu (Chinese: 裴梓慕) as Girl in the street
- Li Wen (Chinese: 李文) as Guy in the street
- Maggie Xue Zhu (Chinese: 薛竹) as Woman in a bar

== Production and directors commentary ==
Floating Melon (Fu Guo) was shot in Chengdu. The principal photography took place in September 2015 and the post-production was completed in October 2015. It was produced by Almost Red Productions (company owned by the directors in China) in association with the Spanish company Arkadin Ediciones.

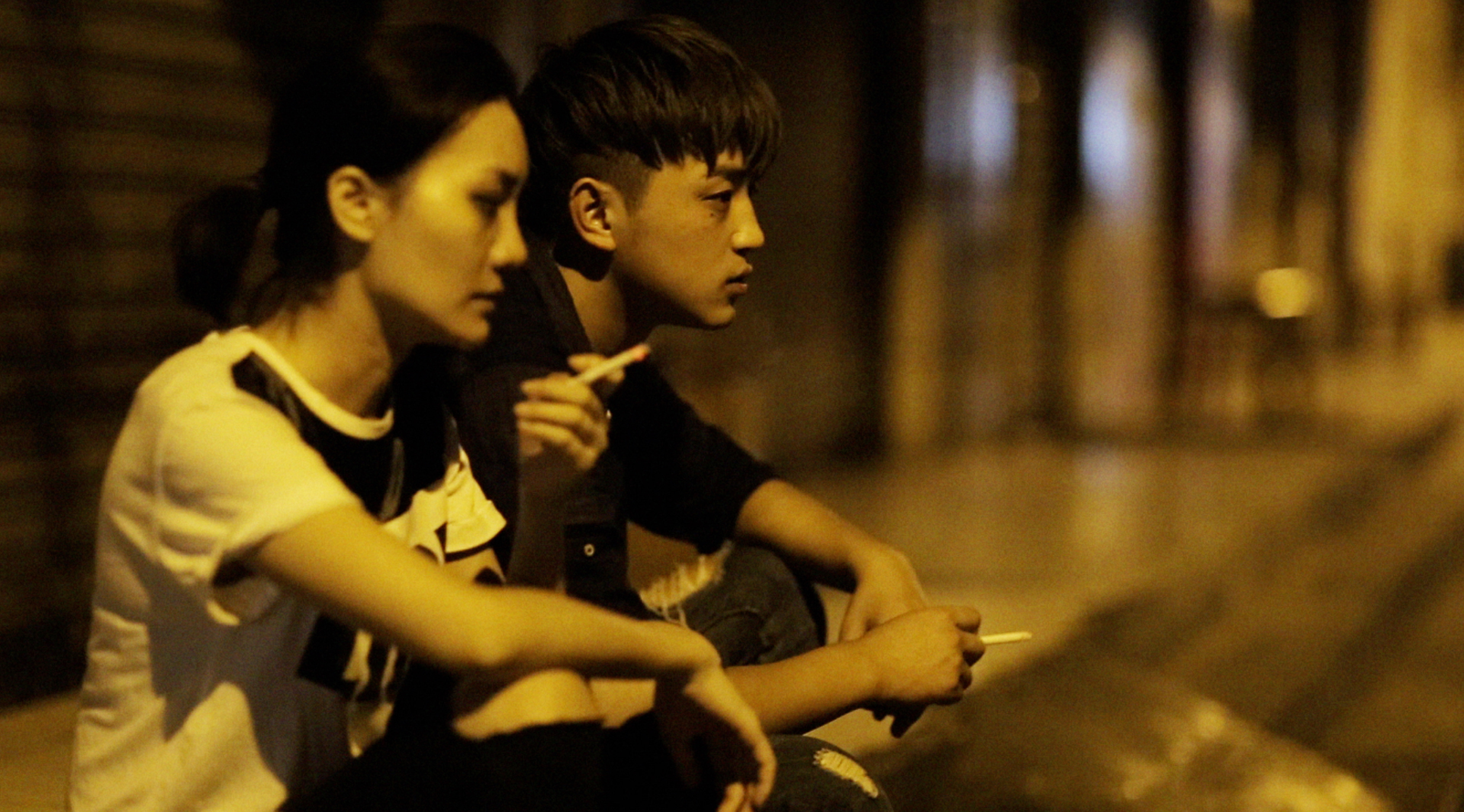
Scene of Floating Melon (Fu Guo) in Chengdu, with Vincent Chen Xi and Wen Sirui.

According to the directors, the main difficulty in the production was the casting. "It was complicated to find a group of suitable actor that were interested in play gay characters and also were not scared of play some explicit scenes. Finally we collaborate with non professional actors. Also the production maintained a low profile to avoid the strong censhorship laws in China."

The directors comment about the film in these terms: "Floating Melon is a fiction film, but inspired by characters that are present in the Chinese contemporary society. It reflects, with a film “noir genre” perspective in stylistic and narrative terms, the story of a young guy that cannot react in a situation that is beyond his imaginations. He needs to take a decision that will risk his future, consequence of the strict rules of the society, since he is surrounded by the confusion present on some of members of the young gay Chinese community, with no moral referents apart from the official doctrine.

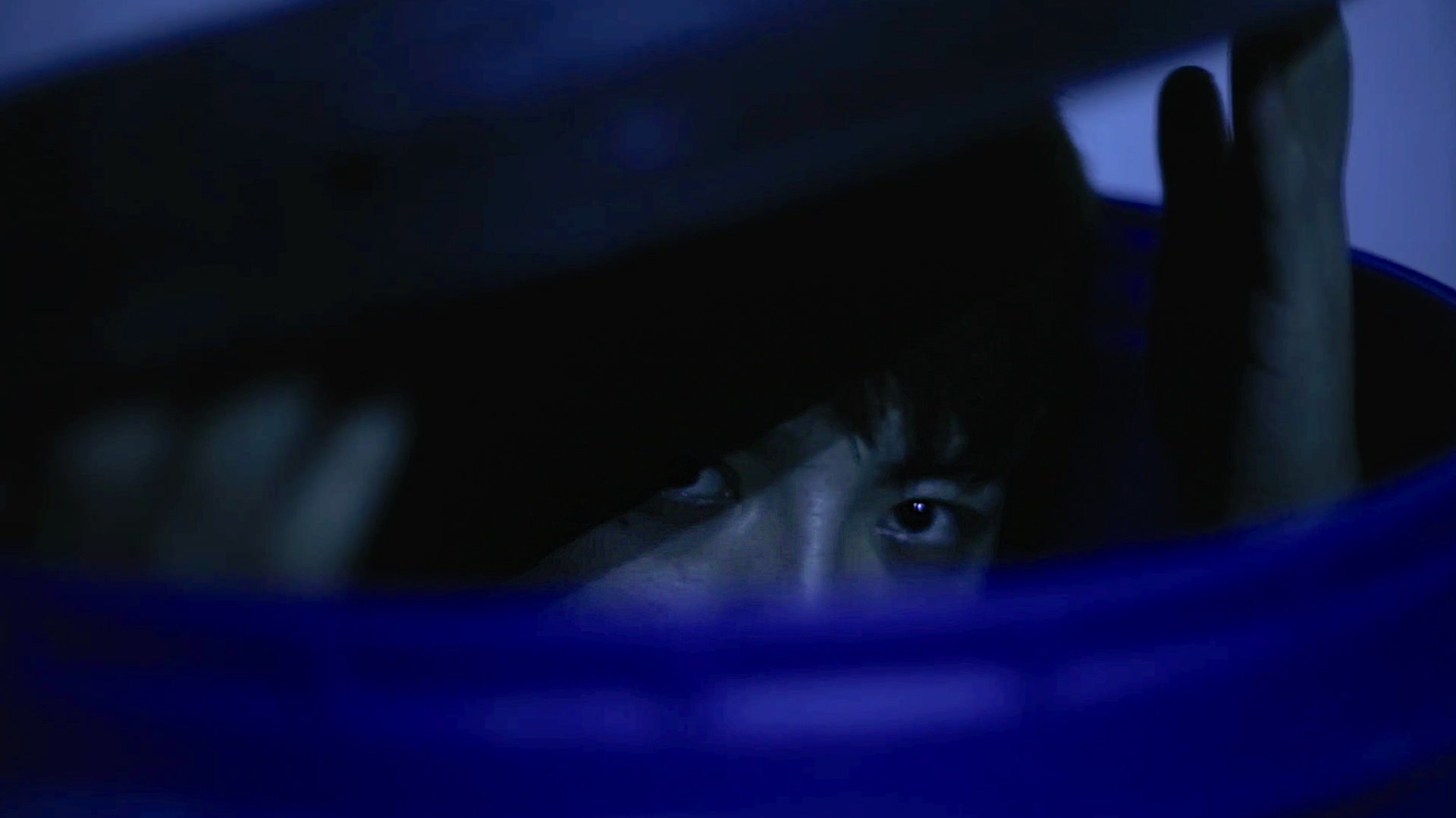
Picture of Floating Melon (Fu Guo) with Vincent Chen Xi, Cinematography Guo Yong.

The representation of the characters is very close to reality and their reactions towards the situations reflect the Chinese society of these days. Also it represents this invisible community, the LGBT, that it is not as persecuted as in other countries, but for family pressures and the lack of protective laws, it need to be self protected. This lack of referents make for some people to take unusual and in occasions dangerous routes to build their relationships."

== Music ==
Floating Melon original soundtrack is composed by Andrea Centazzo. The collaboration between the directors and the composer started in 2008. Floating melon being the fifth collaboration, following Ni Jing: Thou Shalt Not Steal, Mei Mei, Toto Forever and Desire Street. According to the directors, "Fu Guo soundtrack is created from the point of view of the main character, Xiaoxi Cheng. The music guides the emotional journey of the character through the film, following the first moments of horror and confusion, until the last part, where bring us a more nostalgic atmosphere. Centazzo composed some experimental tracks for the beginning sequences, mixing sound effects, electronic music and real instruments. As the story advance, he creates some melodic themes, with guitar and saxophone as the main instruments. The music is essential to understand the evolution of the main character and to understand the meaning of the story.”

== Reception ==
The short film was well received in the different film festivals and events where it was screened. In the first year at the festival circuit, it was presented in over 40 international festivals and received some awards.

The world premiere of the film we held in Spain, at the 53rd Gijón International Film Festival in November 2015. It received the audience award for best short film, Asturian section, at the 15th Avilés Action Film Festival and at the Audience Choice Award for Best Film and Best Cinematography at the 3rd Asturian Film Festival of Proaza. In China the film premiere was held at an art gallery, Shujingtang Alley Art Space in Chengdu on June 12, 2016, and the reactions where very positive. The premier in China was held relatively underground (due to the censorship laws of the country).

== Awards ==
Won:

- Best Short Film Audience Award, Asturian Section Avilés Acción Film Festival, 2016, Spain
- Best Short Film Audience Award, Festival de Cine Asturianu de Proaza 2016 (Asturian Film Festival)
- Best Cinematography (Guo Yong) - III Festival de Cine Asturianu de Proaza 2016 (Asturian Film Festival)

== Screenings ==
- Spain:
  - 53rd Gijón International Film Festival (Asturias, Spain) In competition
  - 21st LesGaiCineMad, Madrid (Spain) In competition
  - 13th Zinegoak, Bilbao International GLT Film Festival (Basque Country, Spain) In competition
  - 15th Avilés Acción Film Festival (Spain) In Competition asturias section
  - 16th Festival of Sant Joan d'Alacant (Spain) Finalist
  - 12th Andalesgai, LGBT Int. Film Festival of Andalusia, Seville (Spain) In Competition
  - 11th Zinentiendo, Muestra Int. de Cine LGTBQI de Zaragoza (Spaint) Muestra
  - 20th La Fila, Short Film Festival of Valladolid (Spain) In Competition
  - 3rd Asturian Film Festival of Proaza (Spain) In Competition
- Rest of Europe
  - 19th Roze Filmdagen, Amsterdam LGBTQ Int. Film Festival (Netherlands) In Competition
  - 17th Queer Film Festival Mezipatra, Prague and Brno (Czech Republic) In Competition
  - 18th Flimmer Film Festival in Norrköping (Sweden) In Competition
  - 7th D'un Bord a l'autre, Orléans (France) In Competition
  - 7th Queer Film Festival at Oldenburg (Germany) In Competition
  - 12th C The Film at Edinburgh Fringe Festival (Scotland)
  - 21st Portobello Film Festival in London (England) In Competition
  - 2nd Queer International Film Festival in Glasgow (Scotland) In Competition
  - 5th No Gloss Film Festival at Leeds, England (United Kingdom)In Competition
  - 11th Serile Filmului Gay (Rumania) In Competition
  - 3rd Taratsa International Film Festival, Thessaloniki (Greece) In Competition
  - 2nd International Boat of Culture (Poland) In Competition
  - 3rd Kreivės / Vilnius Queer Festival (Lithuania) In Competition
  - 3rd Equality Festival of Kyiv (Ukraine)
- Asia
  - 16th Korea Queer Film Festival (South Korea) Official Section
  - 7th Kashish, Mumbai Int. Queer Film Festival (India) Exhibition
  - 1st Harmless Hugs, Delhi Int. Queer Theater and Film Festival (India)
  - 2nd Minikino Film Week, Bali (Indonesia) Finalist
  - Shujingtang Alley Art Space, Chengdu
- America
  - 24 Festival Mix Brasil de Cultura y Diversidad (Brasil) International Competition
  - 10th For Rainbow Film Festival of Sexual Diversity at Fortaleza (Brazil) Official Selection
  - 3rd Bogotá Human Rights International Film Festival (Colombia)
  - V Oftalmica Festival de Cine Independiente, Veracruz (Mexico)
  - 13th Outfest Peru, Lima LGBT Int. Film Festival (Peru) Official section
  - 9th Festival de Cine Diversidad Sexual y DDHH de La Paz (Bolivia) Muestra
  - 9th Cine MOVILH, Festival de cine Lgbtii de Chile 2016, Santiago (Chile) Official Section
  - 12th LesBiGayTrans, Asunción International Film Festival of Asunción (Paraguay) Official Section
  - 1st Festival Inter. de Cortometrajes Flor Azul, Buenos Aires (Argentina) International Section
  - 3rd Shortcup, World Film Festival "Copa Dos Cortas" (Brazil)
  - 6th Rio Gender & Sexuality Film Festival (Brazil) Mostra
- Africa
  - 1st Ekurhuleni International Film Festival (South Africa)
