= Xu Xiaoxi =

Chinese film director and screenwriter (born 1981)

- Born: November 18, 1981 (age 44); Chengdu, Sichuan
- Education: NYFA - Los Angeles MFA
- Occupations: Film director; scriptwriter
- Years active: 2009–present
- Notable work: Advent; Floating Melon; Desire Street; Ni Jing: Thou Shalt Not Steal; Mei Mei

Xu Xiaoxi (Chinese: 徐小溪; born November 18, 1981) is a Chinese film director and screenwriter. He belongs to a new generation of filmmakers from China that are educated in the West. Since 2010, he co-directs all his films with the Spanish director Roberto F. Canuto and together open a film production company in China, Almost Red Productions.

Xu obtains some international recognition after he received awards in international film festivals. Due to the distinct personal style of his movies, Xu is considered in some circles as a promising figure in the Chinese industry.

== Biography ==
Xu Xiaoxi was born on November 18, 1981 in Chengdu, Sichuan. He was influenced into filmmaking since childhood, since his father was a cinematographer in those times. He bought him a video camera when he was eight years old. He remembers to start writing stories and record it with his friends.

After high school, he wanted to travel and experience different cultures. He later moved to South Africa to study Fine Arts, majoring in Painting at the Nelson Mandela Metropolitan University in Port Elizabeth, South Africa. Xu gained experience and good skills in drawing, painting, photography, and video art. He worked as a video artist in his final year project The Fluxus of ID, a tribute to Maya Deren. He used video images as the prime means of expression regarding perceptions of cultural identity in a globalized world. In 2006, he graduated the university and received the bachelor's degree of Fine Arts.

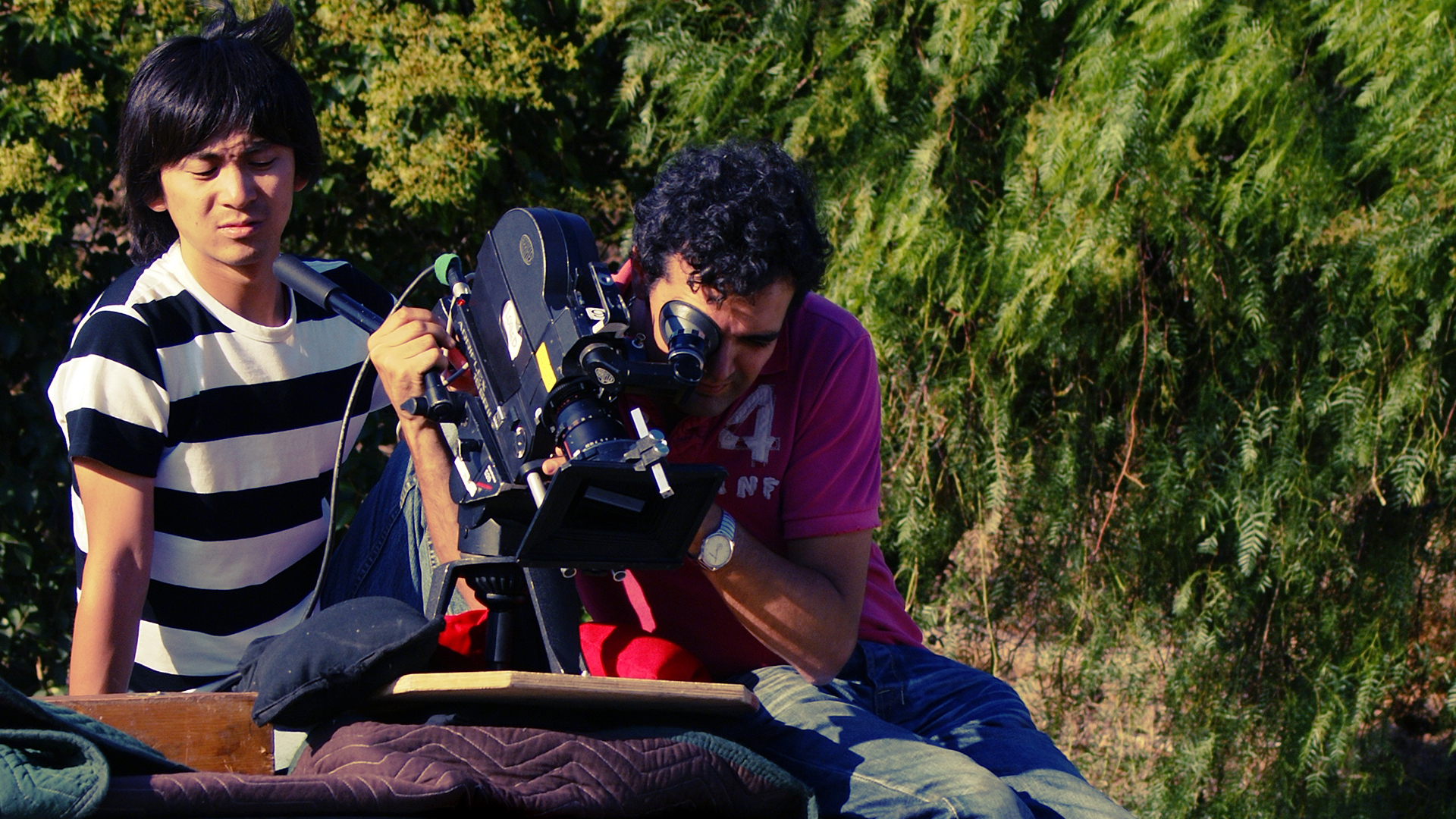
Xu Xiaoxi with Roberto F. Canuto in the set of Mei Mei

After graduation, Xu decided to persuade a filmmaking career and continue his international experiences, so he enrolled in a Master of Fine Arts (MFA) at a filmmaking program at the New York Film Academy in the Los Angeles campus near Universal Studios, Hollywood. There, he directed many short films in celluloid and digital format and collaborated in many others, mainly as a cinematographer (most notorious was Toto Forever, obtaining a nomination for Best Cinematography from his academy at the Kodak Cinematography Scholarships Awards). He graduated in 2009 with Desire Street as their thesis film.

From 2008, his films joined the festival circuit and achieved awards. These films were created with his usual collaborator, Roberto F. Canuto. They had first met when they studied the same master in Los Angeles. His two graduation projects became his most renowned films, Mei Mei (Year One graduation) and the feature Desire Street, co-directed with Canuto (master graduation). Desire Street, which was re-cut and eventually re-released in 2011, received awards at the Asturian Film Festival 2014 and a Special Mention for Best International Feature Film at Mix Mexico International Film Festival 2011, together with other nominations and special screenings. During the postproduction of Mei Mei, the director started the collaboration with the composer who would become part of the team and signature of his work since then, Andrea Centazzo, Italy's top orchestral percussionist and a reference in the avant-garde contemporary music.

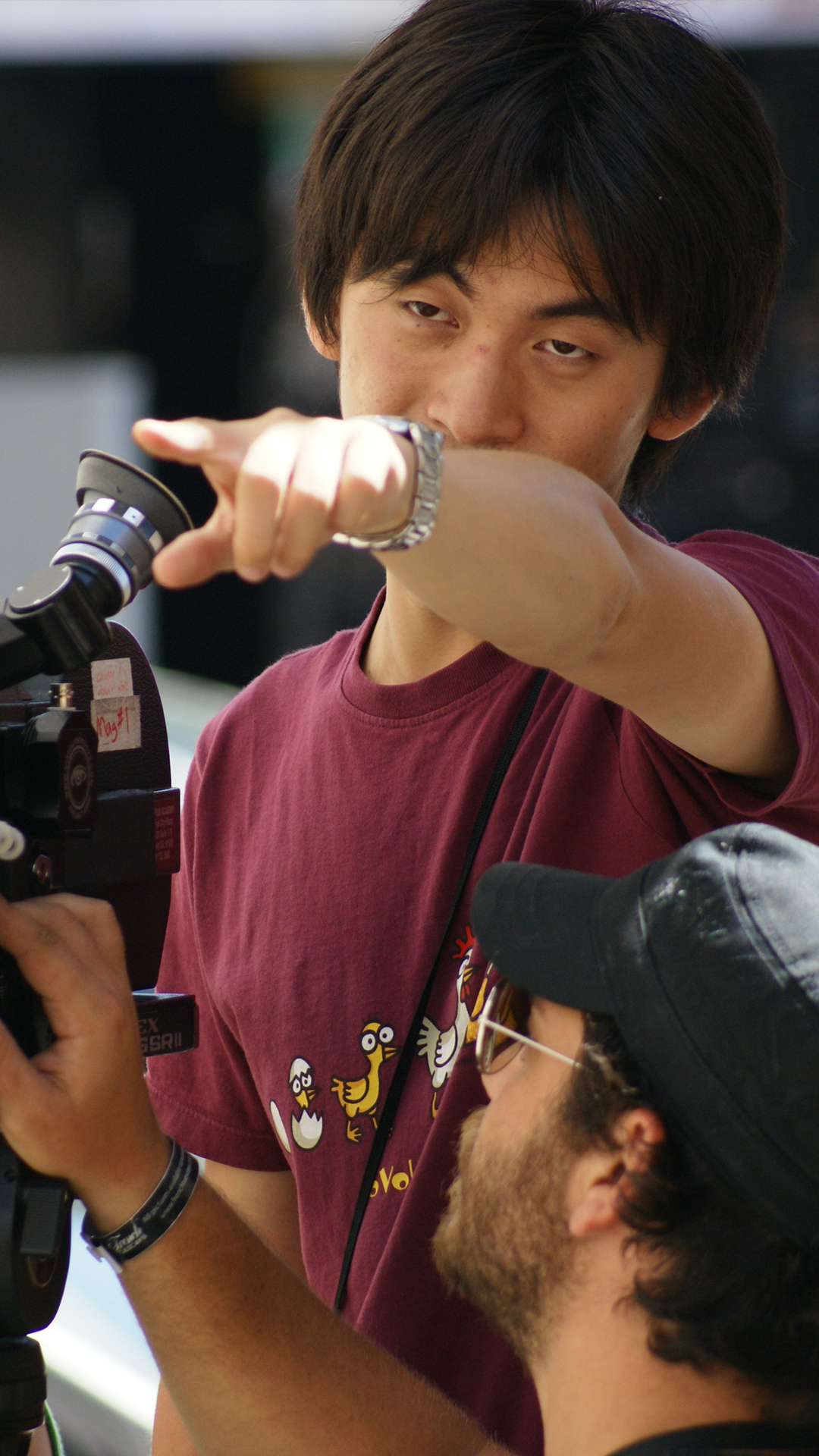
Xu Xiaoxi in the set of Desire Street (co-director and Director of Photography)

Back in China, Xu and Canuto founded officially their own production company, Almost Red Productions, where they alternate the fiction narrative projects with commercial/advertisement works. In 2013, they released the Chinese and Spanish production short film Ni Jing: Thou Shalt Not Steal. This film won the Best Film Award (Riverside Saginaw International Film Festival, Michigan, US) and runner-up for Best Short Film with the Best Actress award going to actress Sherry Xia Ruihong (Asturian Film Festival, Spain), two nominations for the film in the GAVA Awards, 2014 as Best Short and Best Screenplay, together with other nominations and international screenings. In addition to the fiction works, Almost Red Productions creates commercials and collaborates with some non profit organizations, like Concentric Circles, a company that aims to improve the health system in poor rural areas of China.

His film Floating Melon was released in late 2015 and he introduced the project as the second part the trilogy, Invisible Chengdu, after Ni Jing: Thou Shalt Not Steal.

Floating Melon was filmed in his hometown, Chengdu, and with non professional actors. The world premiere took place in Spain at the 53rd FICXIXON, Gijón International Film Festival in November 2015 and in China at the Art Gallery Shujingtang Alley Art Space in Chengdu (Sichuan) in June 2016. It received an Audience Award at the 15th Aviles Acción Film Festival (Spain) and the Audience Choice Award and Best Cinematography Award (Guo Yong) at the III Asturian Film Festival of Proaza, 2016 (Spain). In the first 12 months after the release, it has been presented in over 40 international film festivals in Europe, America, Asia and Africa.

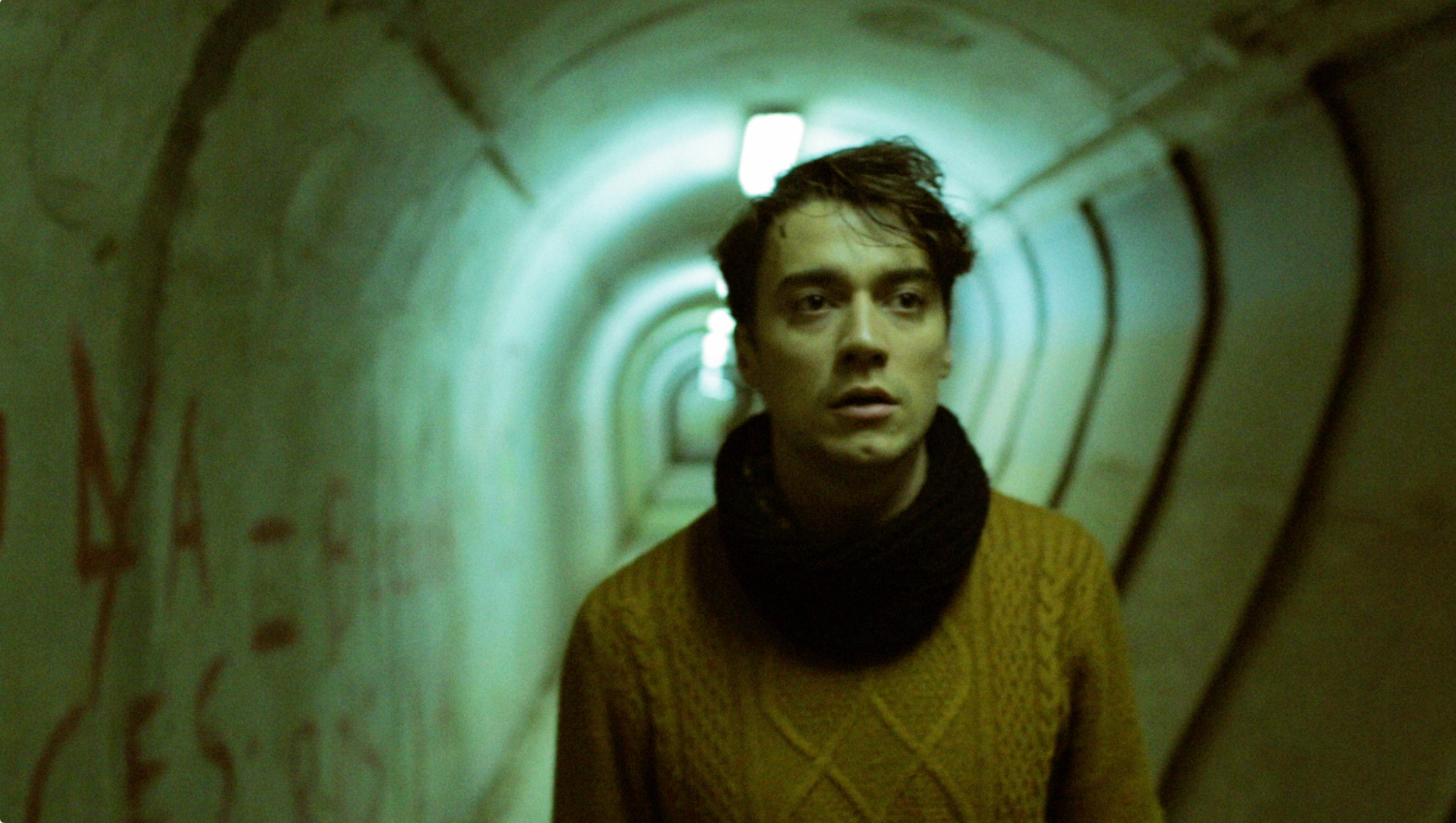
Picture of the film Advent, with David Soto Giganto

In 2016, he directed his first film in Spain, at the hometown of his collaborator Canuto, Asturias, using the language of the region, Asturian, titled Advent (Asturian: Ad-vientu), a psychological mystery drama film. At the world premiere of Advent that took place at the 54th Gijón International Film Festival, obtained the Audience Award Día D'Asturies for Best Short Film.

Sunken Plum, the film that completed the trilogy Invisible Chengdu, was released in 2017. It is a melodramatic comedy with touches of mystery and social realism (with a mix genre typical of the directors). The film uses non-professional actors and the filming took place in Sichuan, mainly in downtown Chengdu, the lake "Bai Ta" and a remote village in the mountains of Sichuan, "Nan Bu".

== Filmography ==
Xu Xiaoxi has directed many shorts and a feature film, but most of his works remain unreleased. Before attending the Master of Fine Arts at NYFA, he directed documentary shorts and experimental works, most notably the video art The Fluxus of ID, a tribute to Maya Deren. During his masters, he directed projects in 16mm film, The Red One camera and other digital formats, like Rope, The Meal or Lila and his first year graduation film, Mei Mei. His master's graduation feature film, Desire Street (2011), was the work that brought him more attention, awards and international recognition but in 2013 and beyond, he has continued to produce under Almost Red Productions in China, and also co-directs with Roberto F. Canuto. The first productions of Xu in China attracts media attention, with press interviews and TV coverage.

=== Invisible Chengdu trilogy (2017) ===
Invisible Chengdu (Spanish: El Chengdu Invisible) is Roberto F. Canuto and Xu Xiaoxi's trilogy of short films filmed in Sichuan and using the local language of Sichuan, Sichuanese Mandarin. This set of films reflects the underground scene of Chengdu. It includes Sunken Plum (2017), Floating Melon (2015), and Ni Jing: Thou Shalt Not Steal (2013). The trilogy tell stories about people normally segregated and that have to survive in the shadows of the Chinese society, that is against diversity and individuality.

=== Sunken Plum (2017) ===
Sunken Plum (Chinese: 沉李; pinyin: Chen Li; lit. 'sunken plum') is Roberto F. Canuto and Xu Xiaoxi's latest short film, it was released in October 2017. Produced by "Almost Red Productions" (China) in association with "Arkadin Ediciones" (Spain). It is a melodramatic comedy with mystery elements and tells the story of a transgender woman who works in a nightclub in Chengdu. She gets a visit from her cousin to let her know that her mother is deceased. As the only son, she feels obligated to return to her birthplace, but can not appear as a woman in front of her family.

Filmed in October 2016 and partially produced with a crowdfunding project, and co-produced between Spain and China, the film uses non professional actors.

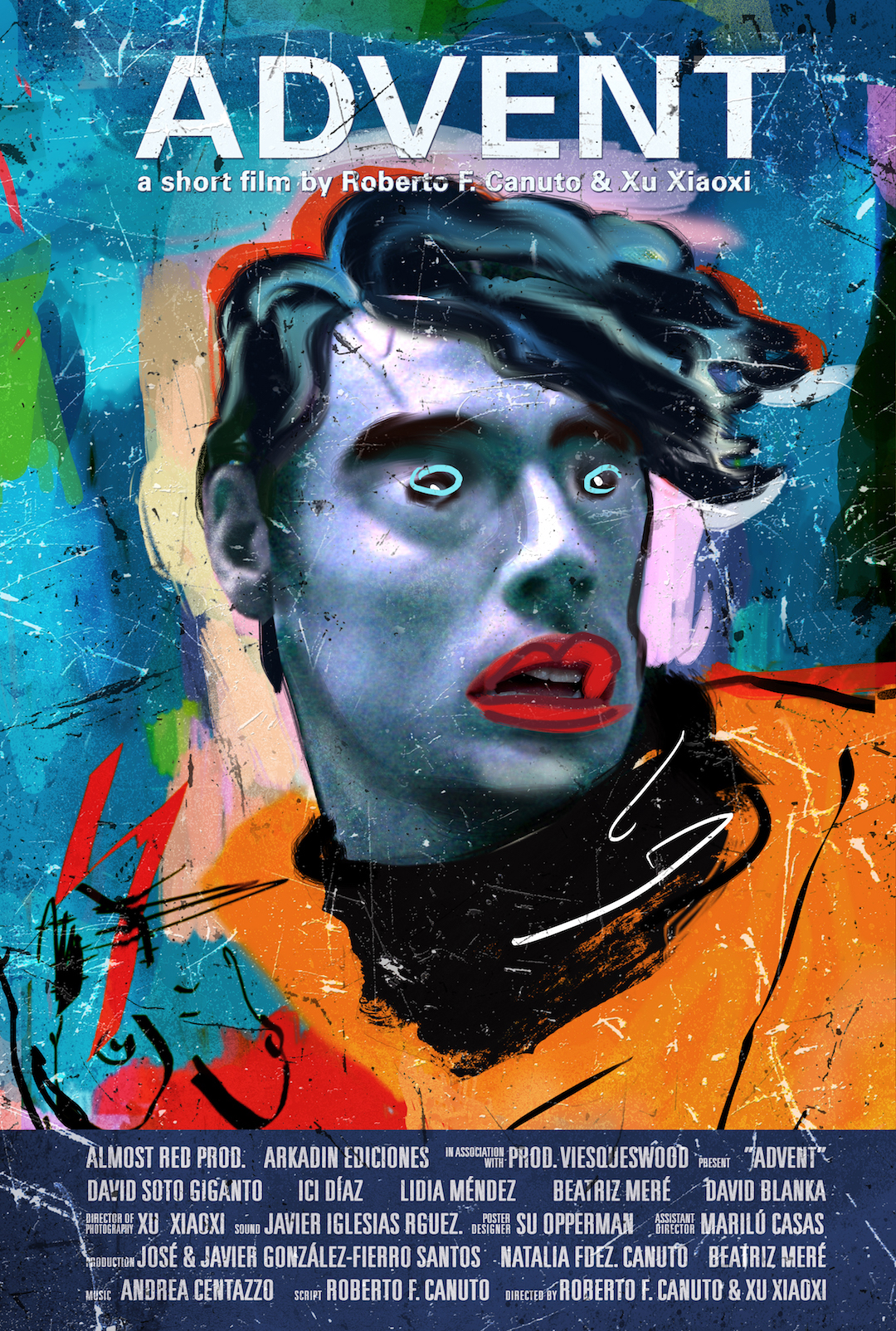
English poster of Advent

=== Advent (Ad-vientu) (2016) ===
Advent (Asturian: Ad-vientu; Chinese: 等候; pinyin: Deng Hou; lit. 'waiting') is a 2016 Spanish and Chinese co-production psychological drama film, written and directed by Roberto F. Canuto and Xu Xiaoxi. It is the first movie of the directors filmed in Spain.

Advent was shot in Asturias, with locations in the medieval center of the city of Avilés, the historical Cemetery La Carriona and some beaches and walkways of Carreño, mainly in Perlora and Xivares. It is spoken in Asturian (something unusual in the Spanish cinema).

Advent tells the story of Suso, a dazed young unemployed man that tries to discover the identity of an unusual girl, who he spies on a secluded beach, as she reminds him of his dead mother. She runs throwing herself off a cliff, but it will not be the last time that she crosses his path. The main character is performed by David Soto Giganto, an actor from the Youth National Company of Classic Theater and in the rest of the cast we find actors mainly from the Dramatic Art Academy of Asturias, like Ici Díaz o Beatriz Meré, together with other experienced actors as Lidia Méndez o David Blanka.

The premiere of Advent took place at the 54th Gijón International Film Festival on the 25 of November 2016 and the film obtained the Audience Award Día D'Asturies for Best Short Film. It started the international festival circuit in 2017.

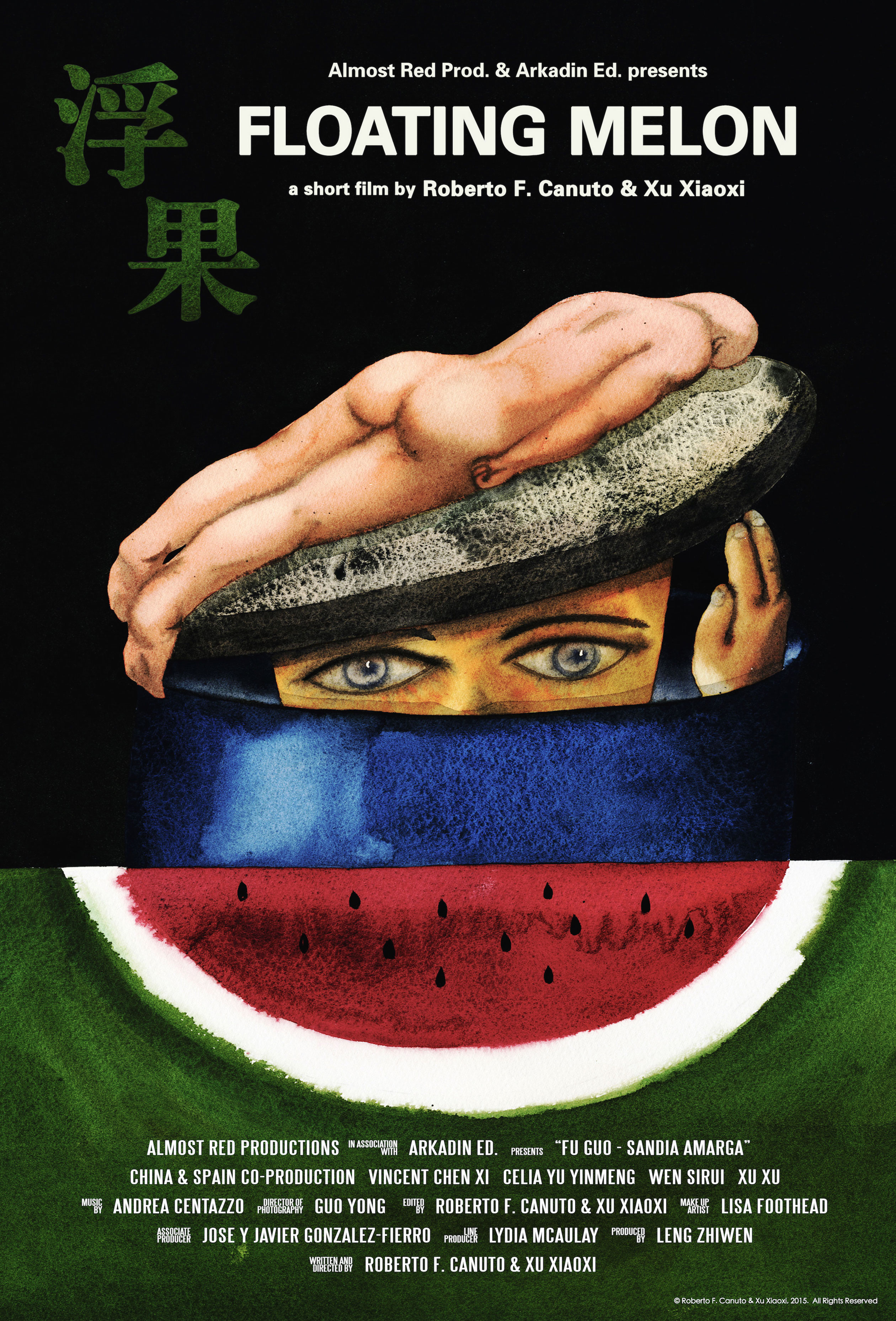
English poster of Floating Melon

=== Floating Melon (2015) ===
Floating Melon (Chinese: 浮果; pinyin: Fu Guo; lit. 'floating fruit'; Spanish title Sandía amarga) is a 2015 Spanish and Chinese co-production drama film written and directed by Roberto F. Canuto and Xu Xiaoxi. It is a low budget independent short movie that tells the story of Xiao Cheng, when he finds his lover dead in his bed, after a lethal drug overdose. In the dark roads of Chengdu, Xiao Cheng, scared of the consequences, sent a message asking for help to his friend. She thinks that the best solution is to hide the body, but when they return to the apartment, they found the unexpected.

The film has a strong film noir influences and it is performed by non professional actors and it includes themes very delicate, often censored in China, specially the representation of the homosexuality in young people, a community that need to protect themselves due to the lack of protective laws in the country. The story is partially based in true events, but the atmosphere is close to the film noir genre, to reflect the only situation where queer people can express themselves, community that needs to live in the shadows of the night in the Chinese society. It tells the story of Xiao Cheng, a young Chinese guy that ask for help to a friend to resolve a big trouble, the guy with whom he spend the afternoon is dead on his bed from the effect of a drug, not something the Chinese authorities look kindly on.

The world premiere of the film we held in Spain, at the 53rd Gijón International Film Festival in November 2015. It received the audience award for best short film, Asturian section, at the 15th Aviles Action Film Festival and at the Audience Choice Award for Best Film and Best Cinematography at the 3rd Asturian Film Festival of Proaza. In China, the film premiere was held at an art gallery, Shujingtang Alley Art Space in Chengdu on June 12, 2016, and the reactions where very positive. The premiere in China was held relatively underground (due to the censorship laws of the country).

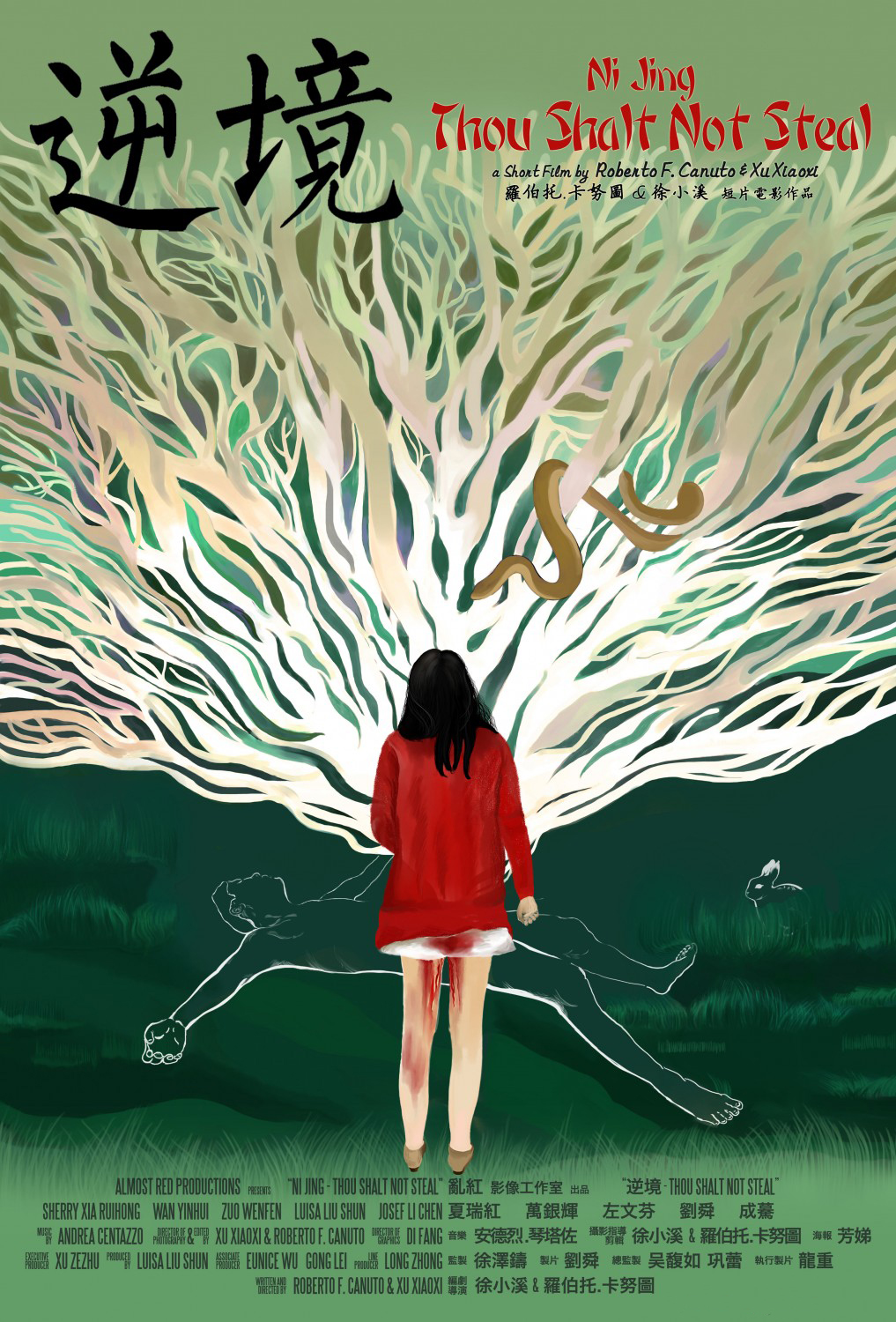
English poster of Ni Jing

=== Ni Jing: Thou Shalt Not Steal (2013) ===
Ni Jing: Thou Shalt Not Steal (Original Chinese: 逆境; pinyin: Ni Jing; lit. 'adversity'; Spanish Title Ni Jing: No Robarás) is his first film produced in China by his company Almost Red in co-production with Spain. A naive Chinese girl is forced to confront betrayal after she awakes in a remote forest covered in blood.

Ni Jing received accolades: Best Short Film in the world premiere at Riverside Saginaw International Film Festival 2013, Best Actress (Sherry Xia Ruihong), runner up for Best Short Film, and a nomination for Best Actor (Yinhui Wan) at the 9th Asturian Film Festival, 2014. The Ni Jing Spanish premiere took place at the prestigious FICXIXON, Gijón International Film Festival in 2013.

The critical reactions from the various presentations were very positive:

- Fenixnet Entertainment News in China: "The film represent very truthfully the local society of Chengdu and the good communication among the directors, that belong to different cultures, creates great results".
- Sichuan Daily News (lead newspaper of the region): "Audiences at the press screening were captivated for the atmosphere and the rhythm of the film"

Ni Jing: Thou Shalt Not Steal played in the International Festival Circuit around 2014.

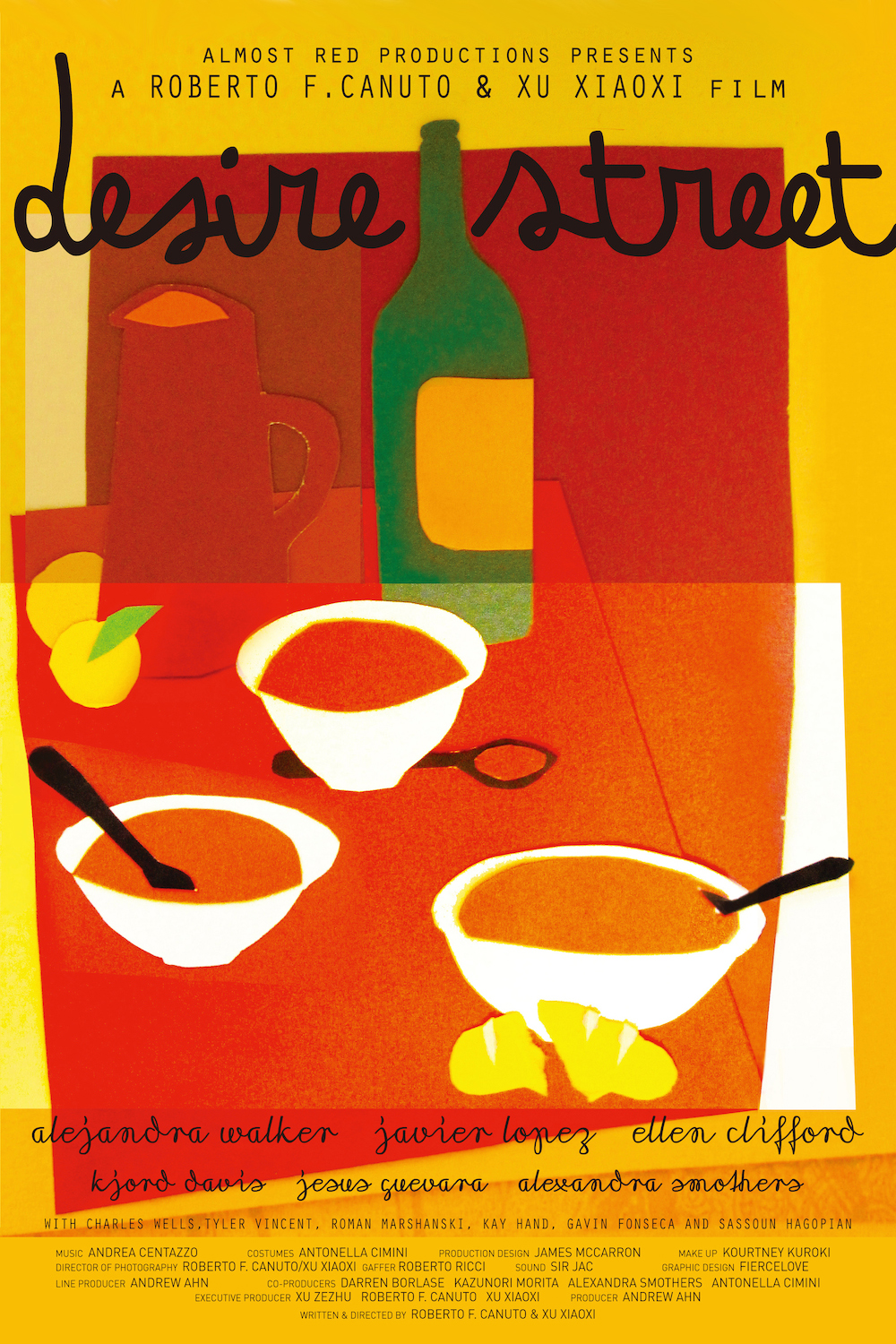
Poster Desire Street

=== Desire Street (2011) ===
Desire Street is Xu Xiaoxi and Roberto F. Canuto's first feature film, produced as a graduation work in their Master of Fine Arts at the NYFA in Hollywood. The story follows three family members (mother, daughter and son) as they try to survive their loneliness and obsessions by going through different sexual experiences and relationships with a prostitute. The reference of the directors was the Mexican melodramas of the 1960s. They exaggerate the representation of the characters to accentuate the irony that is a basic element in the story, creating many situations of comedy. At the end of the story the family became the main reference for the individual survival. The reception at film festivals was very good, scoring positive reviews and awards (Best Film at Asturian Film Festival in Spain and Special Mention Best Feature at Mix Mexico International Film Festival):

- Jury conclusion at Mix Mexico International Film Festival, 2011: Desire Street has "a very well structured script, strong story and great characters".
- Jury conclusions at the Asturian Film Festival, 2014: "Desire Street develops, with technical mastery and a good treatment of the script, the generation gap and the family and sexual conflicts in a multiethnic society".
- Film critic from Dickie King at MTG.com, 2011: "The characters could be from an Almodovar movie as they seem to need to behave in extraordinary ways in order to draw some sexual, psychological advantage... The use of subjective camera movement, composition and mirrored reflections are effective in conveying a real sense of false perceptions... The collaborations of Roberto Canuto and Xu Xiaoxi make them the future wave as these two engaging directors bring together fresh insight with redesigned camera work."

The premiere of Desire Street in Spain took place in 2014 at the Asturian Film Festival (obtaining the "Best Film Jury Award" and a nomination for Best Actress: Alejandra Walker). In China was screened at the Contemporary Art Museum A4 of Sichuan also in 2014.

=== Mei Mei (2009) ===
Mei Mei, his first year graduation film at "New York Film Academy", was written by Xu Xiaoxi and Roberto F. Canuto. The film premiere at Hungary's Slow International Film Festival, a successor to the 32-year-old prestigious Hungary Film Festival born of the Film Art Initiative. Mei Mei was screened in late August 2009 to an international crowd and was received as one of the festival's finest. After the screening the reactions were very positive, and it was received as one of the festival finest works. Some of the media mention that Mei Mei is a "beautiful and heartbreaking love story". In addition to the festival selection, the film received a nomination for Best Cinematography at the Kodak Scholarship Awards 2009, in representation of NYFA, Hollywood. The director of photography of Mei Mei was the filmmaker and usual collaborator of Xu, Canuto.
