= Mei Mei (2009 film) =

2009 Chinese/US drama short film by Xu Xiaoxi

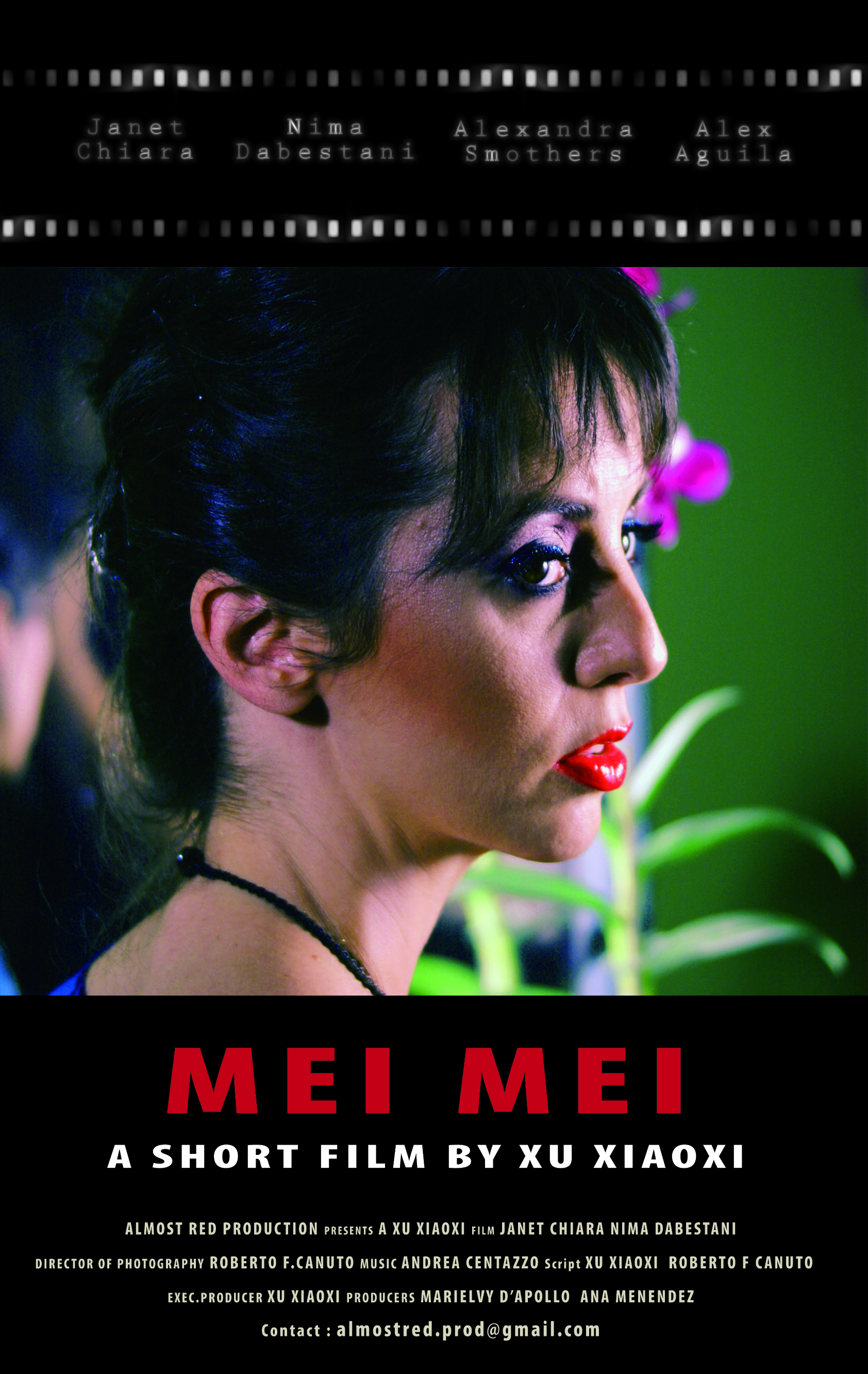
- Directed by: Xiaoxi Xu
- Written by: Roberto F. Canuto; Xu Xiaoxi
- Produced by: Ana Menendez; Marielvy D'Apollo
- Starring: Janet Chiarabaglio; Alex Best; Alexandra Smothers; Kjord Davis; Alexander Aguila; Gudmundur Luovik Porvaldsson; Miles Wood
- Cinematography: Roberto F. Canuto
- Edited by: Roberto F. Canuto; Xu Xiaoxi
- Music by: Andrea Centazzo
- Production company: Almost Red Productions
- Release date: August 22, 2009 (Slow Film International Film Festival)
- Running time: 14 minutes
- Countries: China; United States
- Language: English

Mei Mei is a 2009 Chinese and US co-production drama short film directed by Xu Xiaoxi and written by Roberto F. Canuto and Xu Xiaoxi. The film's premiere took place in Hungary, where the film was part of the official selection at the 3rd Annual Slow Film International Film Festival, a successor to the 32-year-old Hungary Film Festival, born of the Film Art Initiative that includes films from Europe and North America. Mei Mei was screened in late August 2009 to an international crowd and was received as one of the festival's finest.

Mei Mei tells the story of the neighbours Lulu and Julian. Lulu is a prostitute who receives constant visits from Julian, as he believes that she is his missing ex-girlfriend, Mei Mei. Thinking that he is merely trying to win her over, Lulu rejects his advances, but something happen that makes Lulu change her impression. From there, the two embark on a journey in search of companionship in a beautiful and heartbreaking love story.

Australian actress Janet Chiarabaglio, best known for her roles in Songbird (Official Selection of the 2007 Sundance Film Festival), Inspector Gadget II, and Jeopardy 3, appears in the lead role following her Jury Award at the Boston Independent Film Festival. Los Angeles-based Alex Best, whose feature credits include American Dreamz with Dennis Quaid and Vicious Circle (winner of the Best Film in the New York International Latino Film Festival) is the male lead of the cast, as the love sick Julian.

The film, due to the relationship that the main character Lulu establish with her "special friend" CoCo, was included in some LGBT events, as lesbianism is in the subtext of the story.

The film also received the nomination for Best Cinematography at the 2009 Kodak Scholarship Awards in the United States, being the official representative of NYFA from Los Angeles.

== Plot ==
Lulu, a high class prostitute, receives constant visits from her neighbor Julian, as he believes that she is his missing ex-girlfriend Mei Mei. He begs her for the chance to start their relationship again. Lulu rejects him as she thinks that he is just making up stories to win her over. Soon she starts to miss him, however it may be late as she discovers that Julian has found the real Mei Mei, who looks startlingly similar to her.

== Cast ==
- Janet Chiarabaglio as Lulu / Mei Mei
- Alex Best as Julian
  (credited Nima Dabestani)
- Alexandra Smothers as CoCo
- Kjord Davis as Driver
- Alexander Aguila as Client 1
- Gudmundur Luovik Porvaldsson as Client 2
- Miles Wood as Client 3

== Production ==
Mei Mei director, Xu Xiaoxi, created the film as a graduation project at the New York Film Academy (NYFA) in Hollywood, but he finish the post-production after graduation, including the involving and atmospheric music of Andrea Centazzo. The film was one of the first collaborations of the director with the composer, that work together in the next projects, the feature film Desire Street and the short film Ni Jing: Thou Shalt Not Steal. In both cases Xu Xiaoxi co-directed with Roberto F. Canuto.

The film was shot on 16mm film by a grant from Kodak and the principal photography took place in the Summer 2008 in California. Some of the locations where Munholland Drive in Los Angeles and Burbank in California. The postproduction was completed in 2010.

Xu, in addition to his directorial films, has worked as a video artist, cinematographer, and editor, collaborating with Roberto F. Canuto in the short film Toto Forever (Best Short winner at the 3rd LesgaycinePTY International Film Festival of Panama and Third Award at 9th Asturian Film Festival in Spain, among other distinctions).

Director Xiaoxi Xu mentions that his focus in creating the film “was to explore the internal feeling of an abused and beaten down woman that tries to move forward with her life, turning the tables and using men as objects through her career as a prostitute”. The film also addresses the question of identity. “I create two characters that look identical and probably are also very similar in terms of general personality, but their life experiences and environment determine their confidence and how they find control in their lives.”

== Reception ==
After the screening in "Hungary's Slow International Film Festival", the reactions were very positive, and it was received as one of the festival finest works. Some of the media mention that Mei Mei is a "beautiful and heartbreaking love story". In addition to the festival selection, the film received a nomination for Best Cinematography at the Kodak Scholarship Awards 2009, in representation of NYFA from Universal Studios, Hollywood. The director of photography of Mei Mei was the filmmaker and usual collaborator of Xu, Roberto F. Canuto.
