= Ni Jing: Thou Shalt Not Steal =

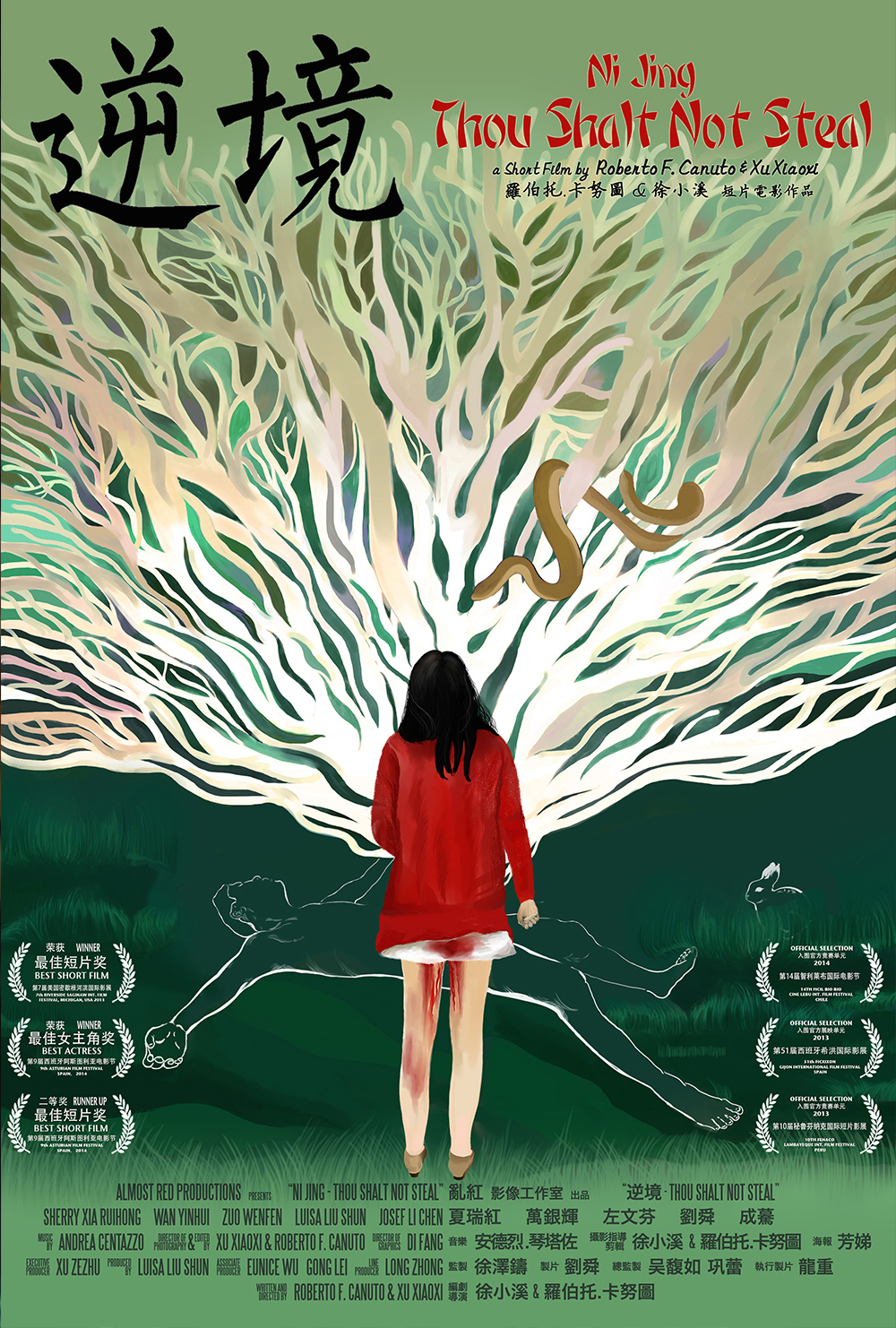
- Ni Jing: Thou Shalt Not Steal International Poster
- Directed by: Roberto F. Canuto; Xu Xiaoxi
- Written by: Roberto F. Canuto; Xu Xiaoxi
- Produced by: Luisa Shun Liu
- Starring: Sherry Ruihong Xia; Yinhui Wan; Wenfen Zuo; Luisa Shun Liu; Josef Chen Li; Alicia Barbadoux; Ye Kuang
- Cinematography: Roberto F. Canuto; Xu Xiaoxi
- Edited by: Roberto F. Canuto; Xu Xiaoxi
- Music by: Andrea Centazzo
- Production company: Almost Red Productions
- Release date: November 9, 2013 (Riverside Saginaw International)
- Running time: 29 minutes
- Countries: Spain; China
- Languages: Mandarin; Sichuanese Dialect

Ni Jing: Thou Shalt Not Steal (Original Chinese: 逆境; pinyin: Ni Jing; lit. 'adversity'; Spanish Title Ni Jing: No Robarás) is a 2013 Spanish and Chinese co-production drama film written and directed by Roberto F. Canuto and Xu Xiaoxi. The film represents one of the rare independent film collaborations between Spain and China, together with the previous film from the directors, Desire Street. The film is based in a true story that happened to a close friend of the directors and it was shot in Chengdu, China, using the local dialect of the region, the Sichuanese Mandarin.

Ni Jing: Thou Shalt Not Steal uses a realistic approach in terms of style and storytelling and tells the story of a naive Chinese girl who is forced to confront betrayal after she awakes in a remote forest covered in blood. The film received the award for Best Short Film in the World Premiere at Riverside Saginaw International Film Festival, 2013 and the awards for: Best Actress (Sherry Xia Ruihong), runner up Best Short Film, and a nomination for Best Actor (Yinhui Wan) at the 9th Asturian Film Festival, 2014. The Ni Jing: No Robarás Spanish premiere took place at the prestigious FICXIXON, Gijón International Film Festival in 2013 and the Chinese premiere at the Contemporary Art Museum A4 in Chengdu (Sichuan), one of the most prestigious museums in China.

== Plot ==
Xiaofan, a young Chinese girl who works at a Karaoke Club, awakes one morning in a remote forest with her body covered in blood. As she struggles to find her way out, she tries to understand the dramatic circumstances which got her into the situation, events mainly related to her attractive and unpredictable boyfriend.

== Cast ==
- Sherry Ruihong Xia (Chinese: 夏瑞红) as Wu Xiaoxan
- Yinhui Wan (Chinese: 万银辉) as Chen Zhong
- Wenfen Zuo (Chinese: 左文芬) as Villager
- Luisa Shun Liu (Chinese: 刘舜) as Young Villager
- Josef Chen Li (Chinese: 李澄) as Car Owner
- Alicia Barbadoux (Chinese: 阿丽莎) as Foreign Friend
- Ye Kuang as (Chinese: 邝野) Zhong's Friend

== Production ==
Ni Jing: Thou Shalt Not Steal is the first film shot in China by the directors, after their previous experiences in Los Angeles and South Africa. The principal photography took place in the Summer 2012 and the post-production was completed in 2013.

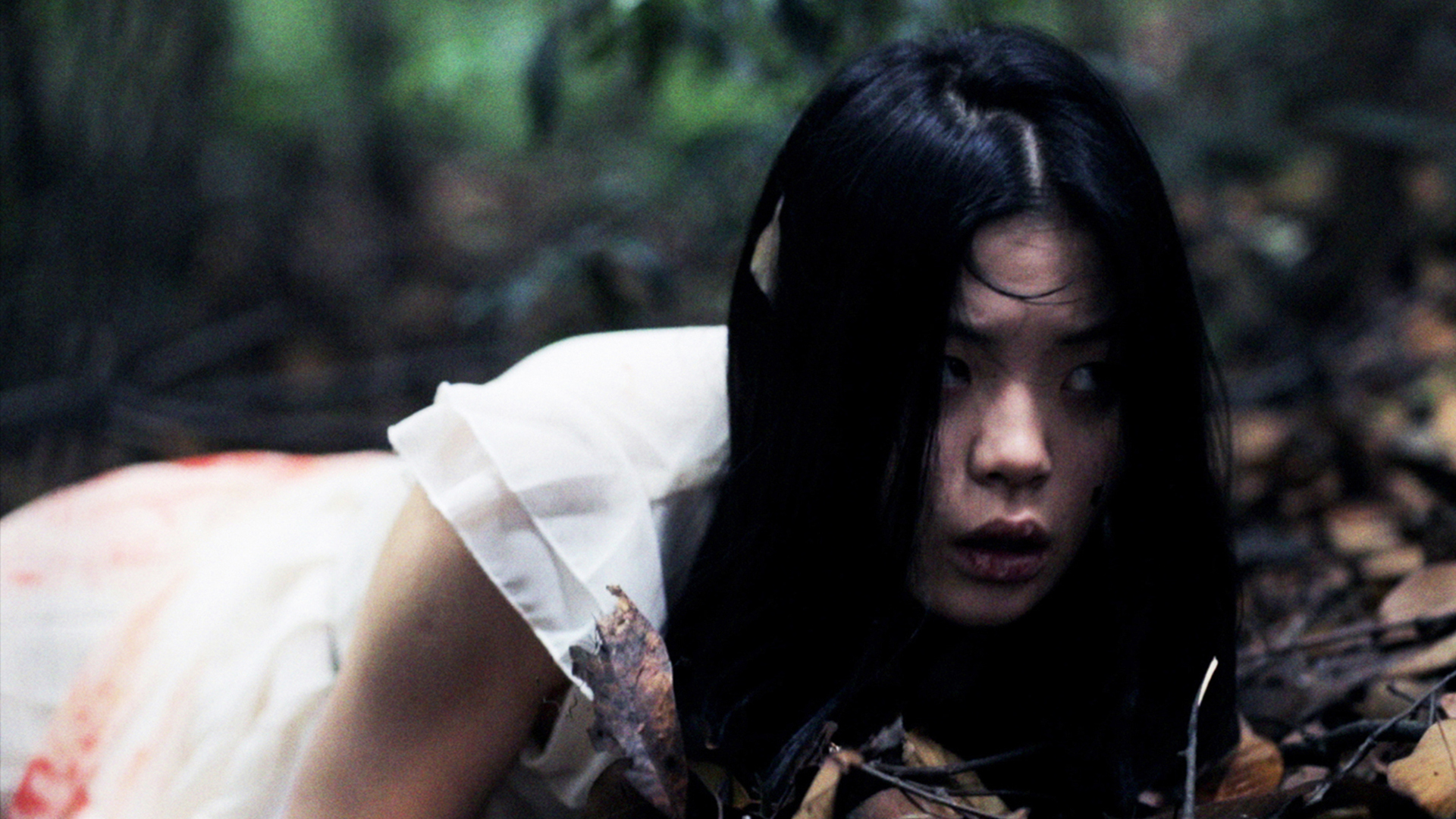
Scene from Ni Jing: Thou Shalt Not Steal in Sichuan, China, with Xia Ruihong.

The film was shot in real locations in Chengdu and surrounding areas, such as: Chengdu City Center, the more traditional urban areas and mountain restaurants of the Sichuan region, the forest at Qing Chen mountain as well as different roads that connect these locations.

Ni Jing: Thou Shalt Not Steal is the first part of a trilogy called Invisible Chengdu, directed by Roberto F. Canuto and Xu Xiaoxi, following by Floating Melon (2015) and Sunken Plum (2017). The trilogy focuses on characters that usually are kept underground and discriminated in the Chinese society, and often not well represented in the silver screen.

According to the directors, in Ni Jing: Thou Shalt not steal they "wanted to represent the different ways in which young people confront relationships in Asia. The perspective is very different for males and females, and pressure from the family is really strong. We do not try to teach or give advice on how things should to be handled; our aim is just to make people think about the nature of such issues, and whether they are right or wrong. Even without exploring in depth the social or family pressures that the characters experience when making decisions (mainly for the short format and the specifics of the story), we can see in the film how these pressures affect the personalities of the characters".

== Music ==
Ni Jing: Thou Shalt Not Steal original soundtrack is composed by Andrea Centazzo. The collaboration between the directors and the composer started in 2008, Ni Jing: Thou Shalt Not Steal being the fourth collaboration, following Mei Mei, Toto Forever and Desire Street.

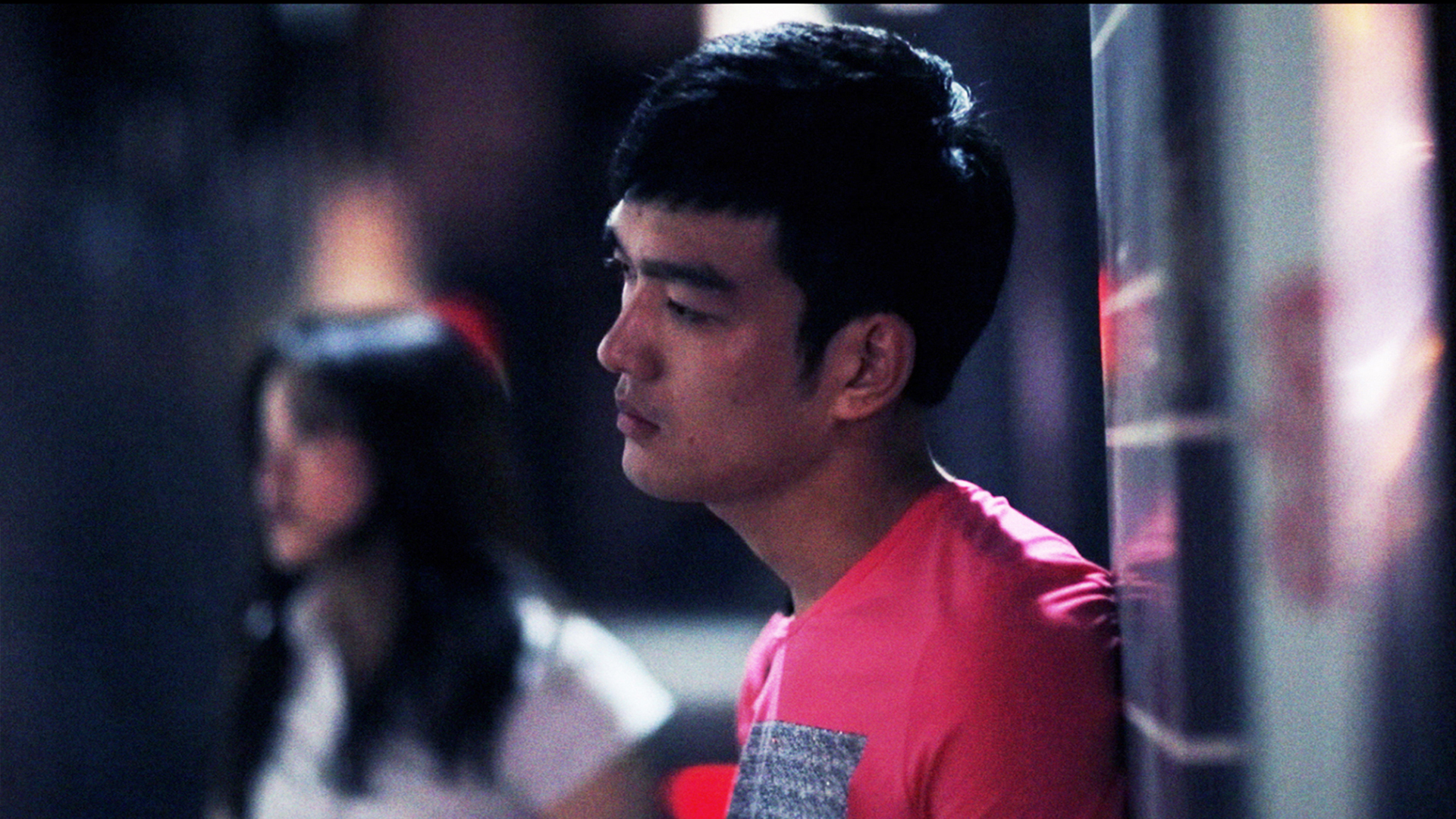
Picture from Ni Jing: Thou Shalt Not Steal, with Wan Yinhui and Sherry Xia Ruihong.

According to the directors, "Andrea Centazzo always show a great interest in the oriental cultura. He is a great artist that know how to adapt to the stories and create a unique atmosphere, and always keeping his personality in the composition". Ni Jing soundtrack is created from the point of view of the main character, Xiaofan. The music guides the emotional journey of the character through the film, moving from the initial moments of horror and confusion, using electronic music, sound effects and real instruments, until the final scenes with a more romantic themes using melodic compositions based in piano and flute. "The music help to understand the meaning from the emotion that produce".

== Reception ==
The film was well received in the different film festivals and events where it was screened, including some awards. At the world premiere of the film, held in the United States, Ni Jing: Thou Shalt Not Steal received the "Best Short Film" award at the 7th Riverside Saginaw International Film Festival, 2014. "Ni Jing: No Robarás" premiere in Spain at FICXIXON, 51st Gijón International Film Festival 2014 and in Perú at the "International Short Film Festival FENACO", 2013. It received three nominations (Best Short Film, Best Actress and Best Actor) at Asturian Film Festival, 2014, being awarded with the first two. Before the actual official screenings, the producers organised a press event in Chengdu. The press reactions were positive, looking forward to the official screening:

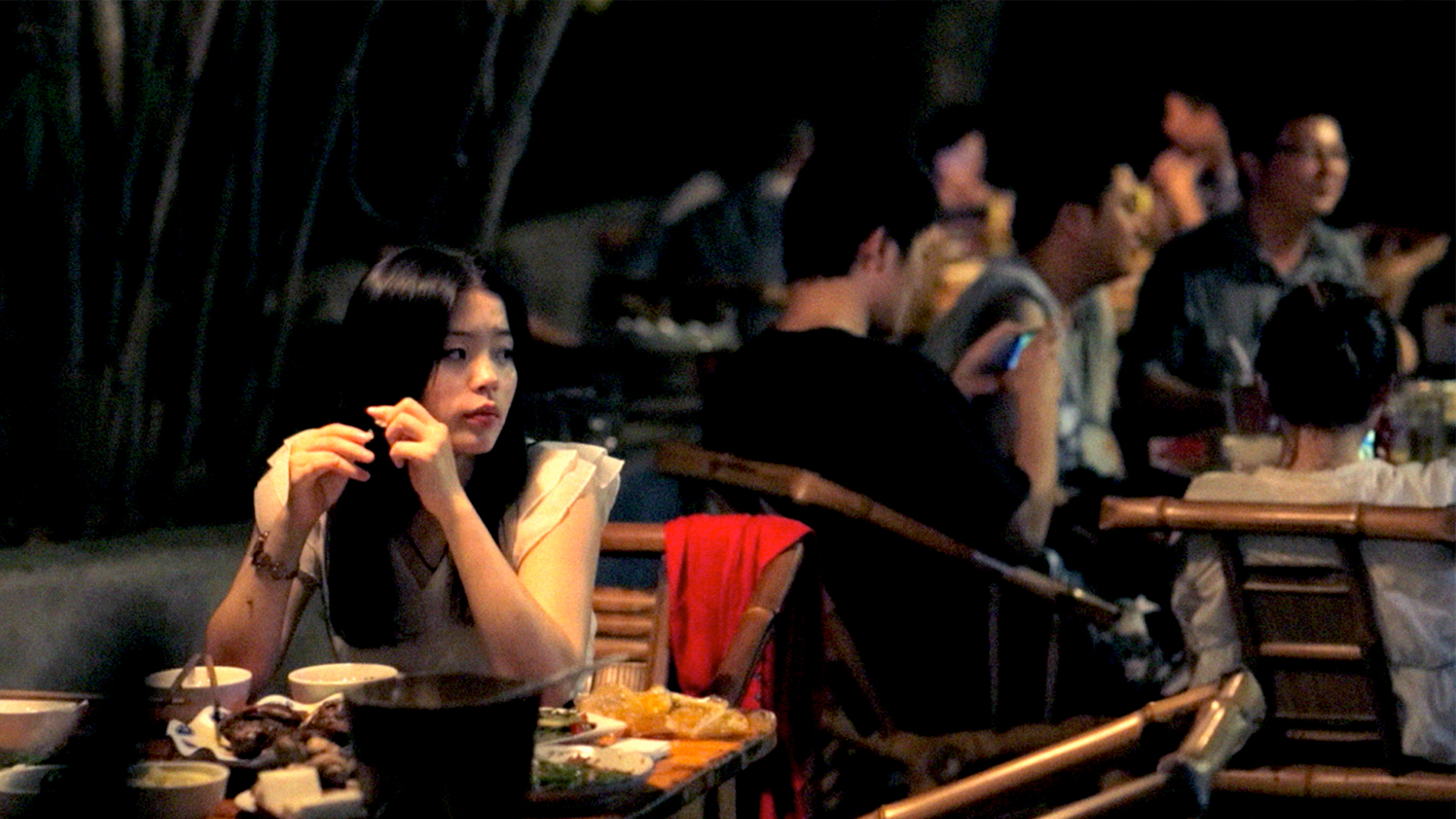
Xia Ruihong in a scene of Ni Jing

"The film represent very truthfully the local society of Chengdu and the good communication among the directors, that belong to different cultures, creates great results", at the Fenixnet Entertainment News, China. One of the leading newspapers of the region, Sichuan Daily, cover all the news regarding the festivals and awards received by Ni Jing: Thou Shalt Not Steal, quoting "that audiences at the press screening was captivated for the atmosphere and the rhym of the film" The Chinese premiere was in August 2014 and took place at the Contemporary Art Museum A4 in Chengdu (Sichuan), one of the most prestigious museums in China, in the exhibition ID/EGO dedicated to the filmmakers and including a showcase of pictures and objects used during their shootings, and presenting also their previous feature film Desire Street. Due to the very positive reactions and the good turnout in all the projections, the exhibition was extended for further weeks.

== Awards and nominations ==
(Awards won are in bold)

- **Best Short Film**, Riverside Saginaw International Film Festival, 2014
- **Best Lead Actress** - Sherry Ruihong Xia, Festival de Cine Asturianu 2014 (Asturian Film Festival)
- **Best Short Film - Runner Up**, Festival de Cine Asturianu 2014 (Asturian Film Festival)
- Best Actor - Yinhui Wan (Nominated), Festival de Cine Asturianu 2014 (Asturian Film Festival)
