= Toto Forever =

2010 dramatic short film

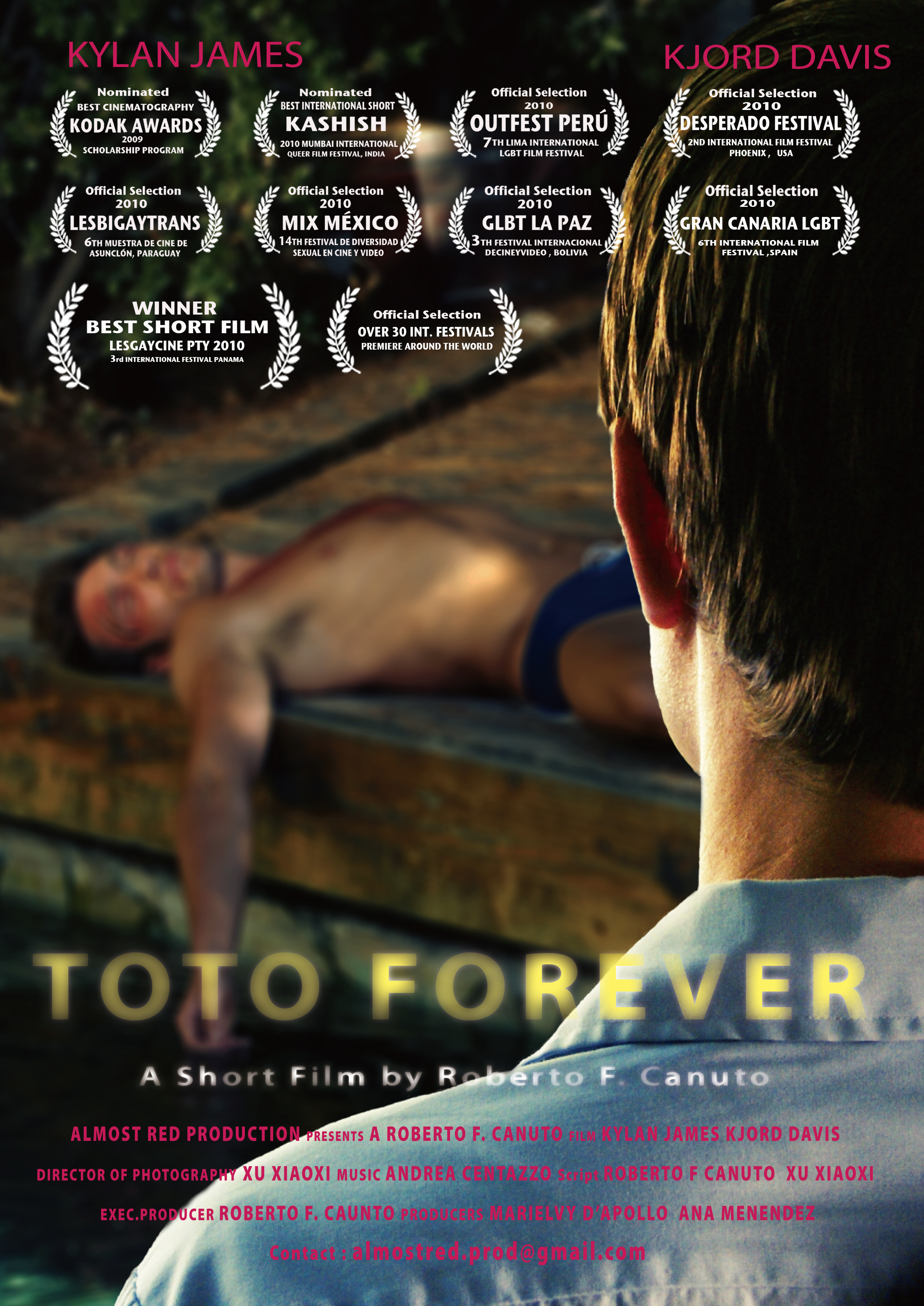
- Film poster
- Directed by: Roberto F. Canuto
- Written by: Roberto F. Canuto; Xu Xiaoxi
- Produced by: Ana Menendez; Marielvy D'Apollo
- Starring: Kylan James; Kjord Davis; Diana Grivas; Alexander Aguila; Alexandra Smothers
- Cinematography: Xu Xiaoxi
- Edited by: Roberto F. Canuto; Xu Xiaoxi
- Music by: Andrea Centazzo
- Production company: Almost Red Productions
- Release date: April 22, 2010 (Mumbai Queer Film Festival)
- Running time: 14 minutes
- Countries: Spain; United States
- Language: English

Toto Forever, also known in Spanish as Toto Para Siempre or Siempre Toto, is a 2010 dramatic short film directed by Roberto F. Canuto, written by Canuto and Xu Xiaoxi, and starring Kylan James, Kjord Davis, Diana Grivas, Alexander Aguila, and Alexandra Smothers. The film was screened at over thirty international film festivals, mainly those with an LGBT theme, winning awards including best film. It is considered a cult film in many circles, becoming a classic in underground Gay Cinema after many screenings around the world.

Toto Forever is a fable in which feelings and emotions are always fully exposed, with a very poetic and symbolic narrative, and an aesthetic strongly influenced by the Yaoi ("Boys Love") Japanese anime. The film tells the love story of Toto, a hopeful young postman who dreams of starting a new life, and Mark, a gangster, who is in deep trouble with a mafia group.

The film premiered at the 2010 Kashish Mumbai International Film Festival, the first LGBT festival in India organised after a Delhi High Court ruling decriminalised homosexual intercourse between consenting adults. Toto Forever was at the opening ceremony, and was the first film screened at the event. Canuto was also invited to screen the film at the opening ceremonies in Panama at the 3rd LesGayCinePTY, the most important gay film event in the country, where it won the best film award. At the South Asian premiere, at Indonesia's Q! Film Festival in Jakarta, there were serious incidents at some of the screenings when radical Muslim demonstrators from the Islamic Defenders Front, and groups of extremists from the Indonesian University, attended the venue with weapons and threatened to set fire to the theatre if the film was screened. Toto Forever was screened in many other venues around the world, receiving other accolades like the nomination for best cinematography at the 2009 Kodak Scholarship awards in the United States.

== Plot ==
While delivering a package, a young postman Toto (Kylan James) discovers an injured man lying next to an inground pool and tends to his wounds. Mark (Kjord Davis) is in trouble with the mob and the two men decide to flee together. While resting on the side of the road, Toto gazes longingly at the handsome fugitive. He touches the sleeping man's hand and leans over to kiss him... and is surprised when the kiss is returned.

== Themes ==
The film explores the psychological aftermath of trauma and the brief, profound connections that can occur between strangers. Through the relationship between the young postman and the wounded gangster, director Roberto F. Canuto examines themes of forbidden desire, emotional healing, and the loss of innocence.

== Cast ==
- Kylan James as Toto
- Kjord Davis as Mark
- Diana Grivas as Nurse
- Alexander Aguila as Gangster
- Alexandra Smothers as Mysterious Woman

== Production ==
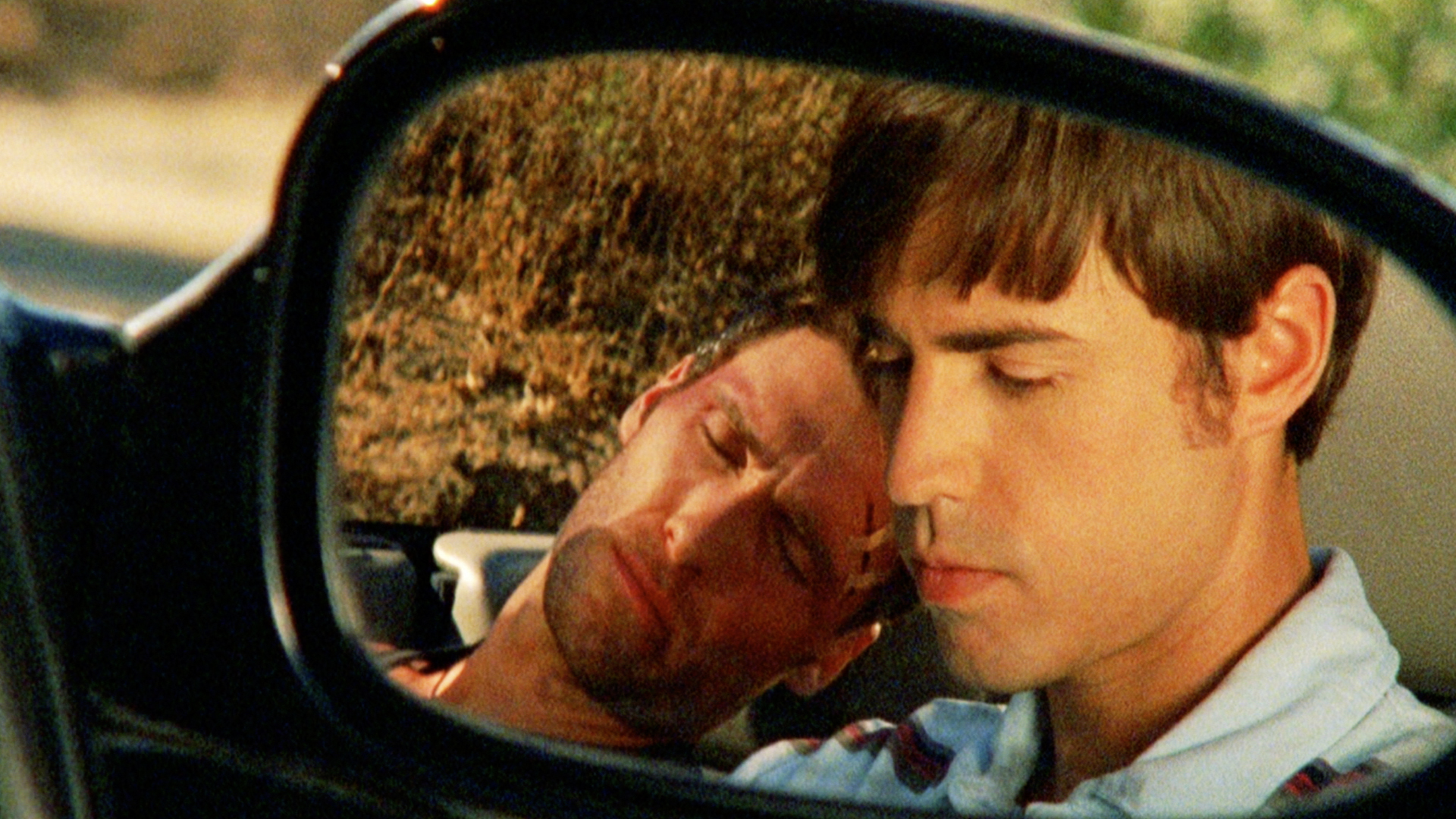
Scene from Toto Forever with Kylan James and Kjord Davis.

Toto Forever's director, Roberto F. Canuto, shot the film as a graduation project at the New York Film Academy (NYFA) in Hollywood, but he finished the post-production work after graduation, including adding music by Andrea Centazzo. The film was the first collaboration between the director and the composer, one which was repeated in their next films together - Desire Street and Ni Jing: Thou Shalt Not Steal. Due to limitations in the production process, various scenes in the script were shortened. Of the film's length, the director commented: "Of course, the whole story need to be tell with more depth and time (sic), but we reserve the full development of the plot for the feature script. Here we concentrate on feelings and emotion. For that reason I wanted to develop a plot that displayed a wide range of emotions in a short period of time." Regarding this, the critic Michael D. Klemm notes: "A short film can be like a sketch for a painting and this one begins, appropriately, with rough drawings of the two leads. The emphasis here, undoubtedly, is what the young postman would remember from his abrupt adventure.

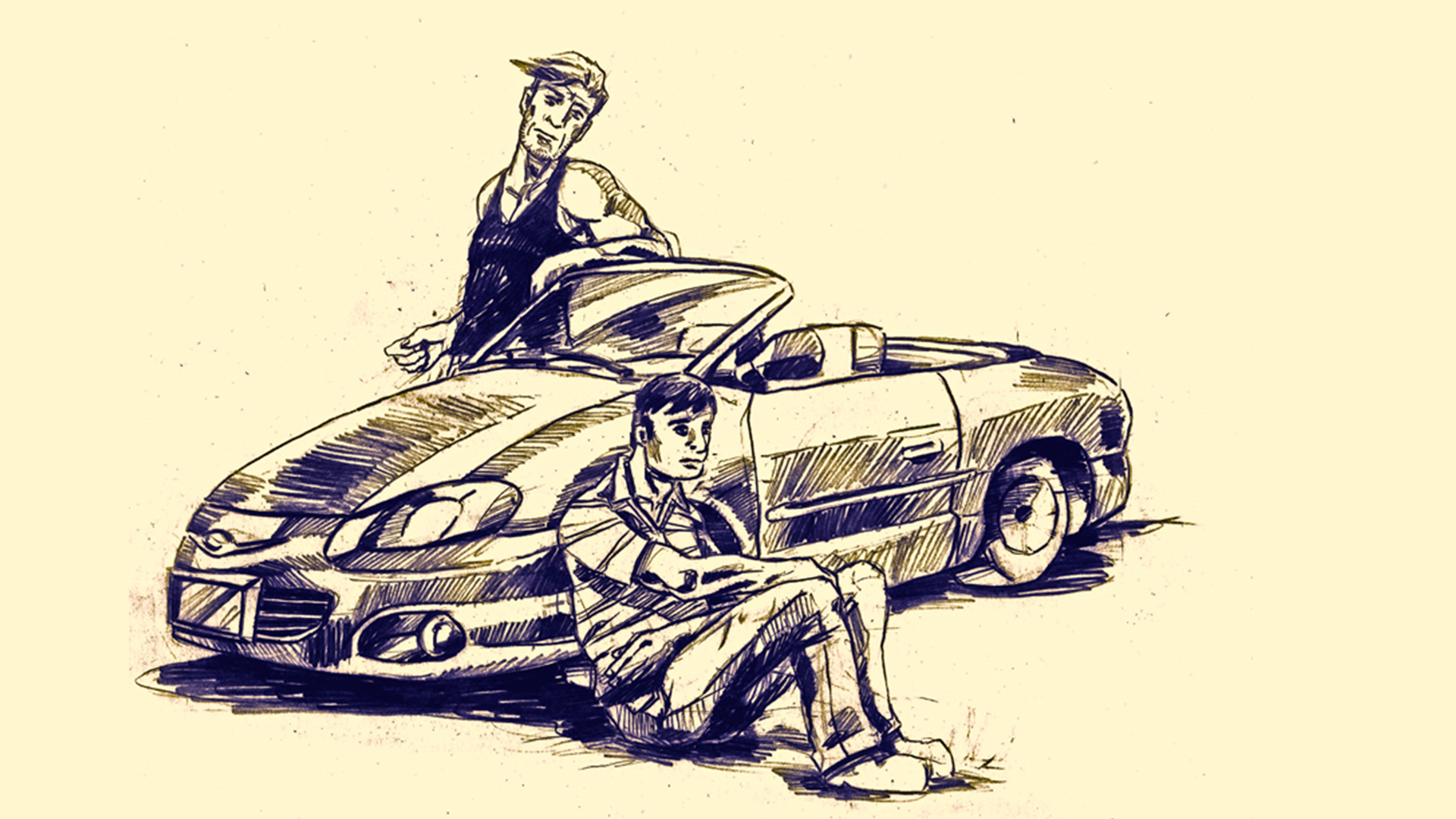
Credit drawings by Susan Opperman

The main idea behind the characters is based on cartoon figures from the Japanese yaoi. In the opening and closing credits the film uses sketches that represent the characters of Toto and Mark, bringing an added dimension to the story. Susan Opperman, a South African artist with an MFA in fine arts, created the images, following her own vision of the story.

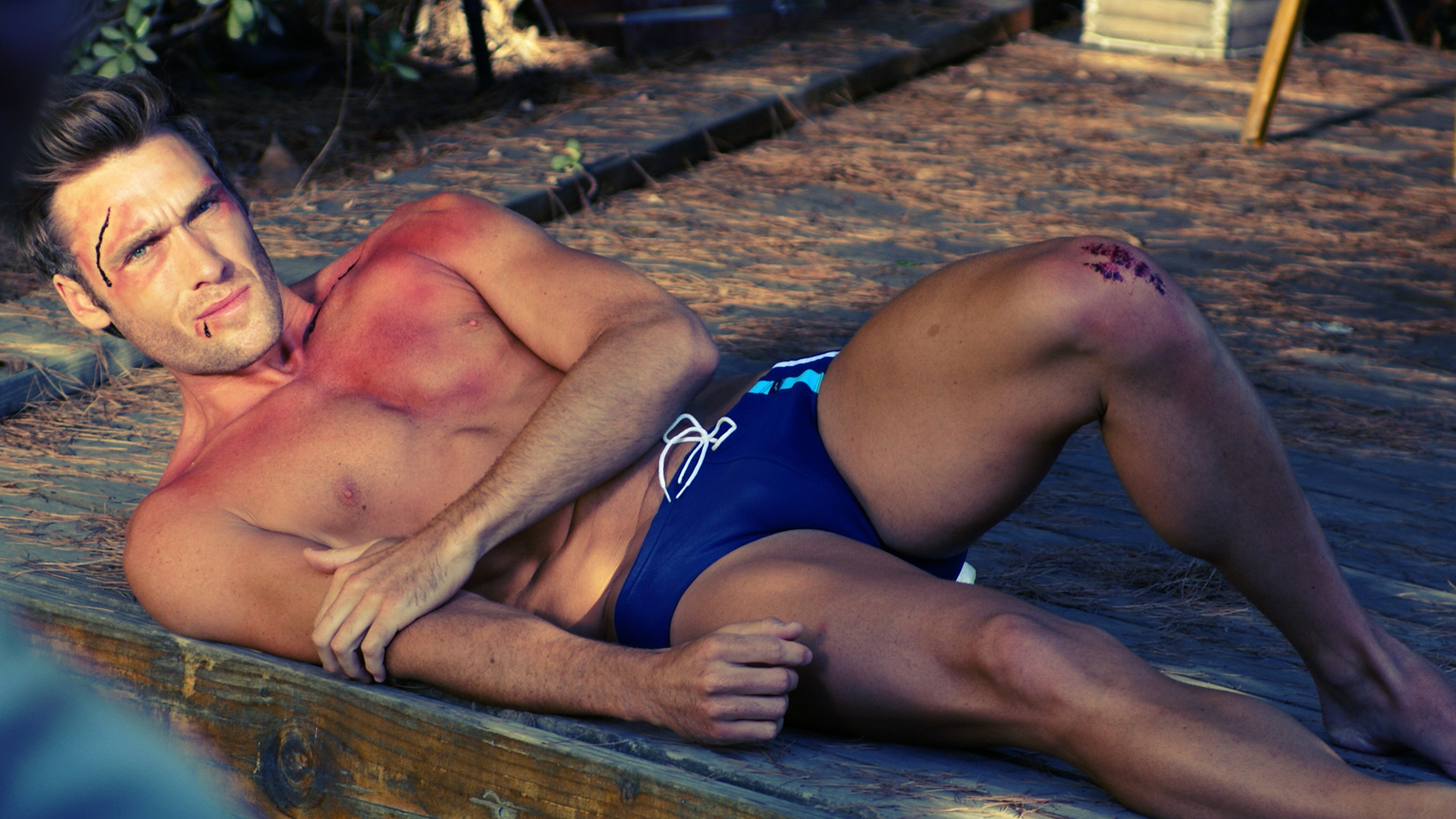
Kjord Davis as Mark in a scene of Toto Forever

The film was shot in 16mm Kodak film and the principal photography took place in the summer of 2008 in California. Some of the locations were Mulholland Drive, Burbank, California, as well as some isolated roads outside Los Angeles. The post-production was completed in 2010.

Xu Xiaoxi, Roberto F. Canuto's collaborator in the directing (Desire Street and Ni Jing: Thou Shalt Not Steal), was director of photography on Toto Forever. The kissing scene between the characters is a key element of the film. According to the Canuto: "I wanted to create a montage for the kissing scene. In order to do so, we decided to break standard time and space in order to create a special tempo that surprises the viewer and suspends the reality of the experience. The kissing scene was difficult to film due to the position of movement in such a tight space. This was key to delivering the right feel and emotion. Kylan and Kjord deliver a moving and touching scene that is also the zenith of the whole story."

The main theme of Toto Forever is hope. According to the director, he wanted to: "recreate the moment when the human spirit recovers after a deep tragedy and rediscovers a new faith about life. Emily Dickinson's poem "Hope" was an inspiration for this film. While she faced the tragedy, it was with this painful moments when she has to allowed herself to find "hope" and move on.

As of July 2014, Toto Forever was still being screened at international festivals.

== Reception ==
The film was well received at the different film festivals and events where it was screened. Among others it won the award for best film at "LesGayCinePTY in Panamá 2010", was third place in the best short film category at the 6u CinegailesAST in Asturias, (Spain) in 2014, and a finalist at the Kashish 1st Mumbai International Film Festival. As of July 2014 the film has been screened at over thirty international film festivals.

The press reactions were positive and the comments highlight the values of the film. Some of the reactions include:

- "Regardless of its brevity, Toto Forever effectively invokes an idyllic mood with an undercurrent of danger. The moments that Toto and Mark get to share are very romantic and sensual...Canuto has a nice eye for the image and effectively exploits the language of close-ups. The lovers' faces fill the screen as they kiss; sometimes the camera lingers only on their lips...Toto Forever is sexy and suspenseful. Despite not being developed into a fully fleshed out movie, Canuto's short contains many pleasures." from Michael D. Klemm at Cinemaqueer.com, 2009 (United States).
- "...Every detail has significance as they subliminally add substance to an otherwise naive narrative. This collaboration is like a marriage of interpretation between the script and the art of cinema: combining the construct of the director with the skill of the cinematographer... The angle of photography requires of us to re-examine and not view things is a conventional way. Backward glances are shown through rear view mirror techniques and distorted reflections off a champagne bowl question the reason and nature of what might be obvious. Just as the crystal is multifaceted and reflects and refracts, we are encouraged to examine, kaleidoscopically and appreciate how brilliantly colourful this ‘gem’ is!" from Dickie King at Movies-TOO-Gay, 2011 (South Africa).
- "... this international hit film promises to become one of the new Gay classic movies and we look forward to seeing the new film by director Roberto Canuto". from Cultura Pride, 2011 (Panama).

== Awards and nominations ==
(Awards won are in bold)

- **Best Short Film**, 3rd LesGayCinePTY International Film Festival of Panamá, 2010
- **Best Short Film - Third Award**, 6u CinegailesAST, Festival de Cine Gai y Lesbicu d'Asturies 2014 (Asturian LGBT Film Festival)
- Best Short Film (Finalist) at Kashish Mumbai International Film Festival, India, 2010
- Best Cinematography (Nominated) at Kodak Scholarship Awards, US, 2009.
- Best Short Film' (Nominated), Festival de Cine Asturianu 2014 (Asturian Film Festival)
