= Perlora =

- Parish
- Location within Spain
- Coordinates: 43.583333°N 5.75°W
- Country: Spain
- Autonomous community: Asturias
- Province: Asturias
- Municipality: Carreño

Perlora is one of 12 parishes (administrative divisions) in Carreño, a municipality within the province and autonomous community of Asturias, in northern Spain.

Situated at 20 m (66 ft) above sea level, the parroquia is 10.96 km^{2} (4.23 sq mi) in size, with a population of 755 (INE 2007). The postal code is 33491.

== Villages ==
Its villages include: Les Arenes, L'Arquiella, La Bermeya, La Braña, La Calabrina, El Caliyu, Campanal, El Campu la Iglesia, Coyanca, Castro, Colloto, El Corredor, Cueto, El Cutu, El Dormón, La Espasa, La Estación, La Estaquera, La Ferrián, La Formiga, Friera, El Monte, La Nozalera, La Pedrera, Perán, El Perecil, Perlora, Ponteo, El Prau, La Rodada, Rodiles, La Rotella, Salguero, Pozal, La Sierra, La Torre, La Xabina and Yebio.

Aerial photography of Perlora in 1965.
