= Desire Street (film) =

2011 film by Roberto F. Canuto & Xu Xiaoxi

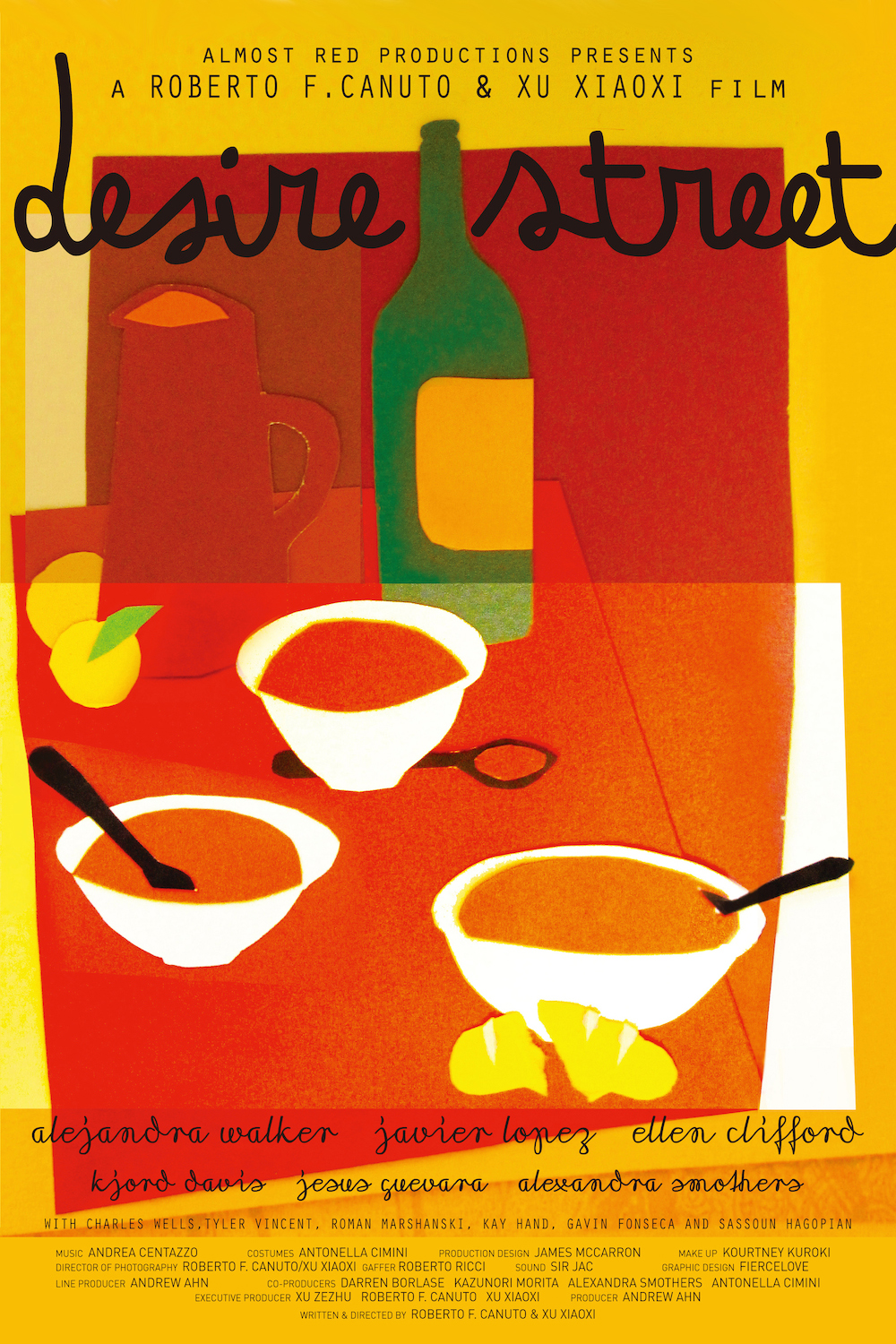
- Film poster
- Directed by: Roberto F. Canuto; Xu Xiaoxi
- Written by: Roberto F. Canuto; Xu Xiaoxi
- Produced by: Andrew Ahn
- Starring: Alejandra Walker; Javier Lopez; Ellen Clifford; Kjord Davis; Jesus Guevara; Alexandra Smothers; Charles Wells; Tyler Vincent; Roman Marshanski; Kay Hand; Gavin Fonseca; Sassoun Hagopian
- Cinematography: Roberto F. Canuto; Xu Xiaoxi
- Edited by: Roberto F. Canuto; Xu Xiaoxi
- Music by: Andrea Centazzo
- Production company: Almost Red Productions
- Release date: June 14, 2011 (Mix Mexico International Film Festival)
- Running time: 82 minutes
- Countries: Spain; China; United States
- Languages: English; Spanish

Desire Street (also known as La Calle Del Deseo or Calle Deseo) is a 2011 comedy-drama film written and directed by Roberto F. Canuto and Xu Xiaoxi. The film features an ensemble cast including Alejandra Walker, Javier Lopez, Ellen Clifford, Kjord Davis, Jesus Guevara and Alexandra Smothers, with Charles Wells, Tyler Vincent, Roman Marshanski, Kay Hand, Gavin Fonseca and Sassoun Hagopian in supporting roles. Revolving around an eccentric and dysfunctional Mexican immigrant family living in Los Angeles, the film is divided into three parts, each one with a story reflecting a family member (mother Carmen, daughter Bess and son Andrea) and the relationship that they establish with a new neighbor, a prostitute named Lucy Bell.

== Plot ==
The story follows a Mexican immigrant family's life in the United States following a tragic accident. The family's matriarch, Carmen, is a widowed single mother of two, who wants to "fix" her teenage son's "confusion" about his sexuality, and seeks solace through her religious beliefs. Her daughter Bess is a curious but sheltered young girl who hides from the world by the clothes she wears and by her behavior, so the world sees her as odd and unusual. Andrea is her teenage son, whose emerging sexuality is of concern to his mother and her religious beliefs, and then he falls for a streetwise man whom he sees as his way to escape to freedom. Each of the family members is coping with a family altering accident in their own way. As they endure their loneliness and the turmoil of maturing, each encounters unique experiences and a lasting special relationship with their ostentatious and passionate new neighbor, Lucy Bell, a companion for hire.

== Cast ==
- Alexandra Smothers as Lucy Bell
- Alejandra Walker as Carmen
- Ellen Clifford as Bess
- Javier Lopez as Andrea
- Kjord Davis as Johnny Black
- Jesus Guevara as Antonio
- Manuel Domenech (Tyler Vincent) as Kevin
- Roman Marshanski as Sasha
- Charles Wells as Priest / Mr. Smith
- Gavin Fonseca as Mike
- Sassoun Hagopian as DVD shop attendant
- Kay Hand as homeless / woman in the lobby
- Yuka Ozaki as Asian woman in lobby
- Kurt Morningstar as Danny

== Production ==
The district of Koreatown, Los Angeles, serves as a backdrop for the story.

The film was initially conceived as the directors' thesis film as part of their MFA degree at the New York Film Academy (NYFA) in Hollywood. After the directors' graduation, the film was re-edited and the post-production was completed.

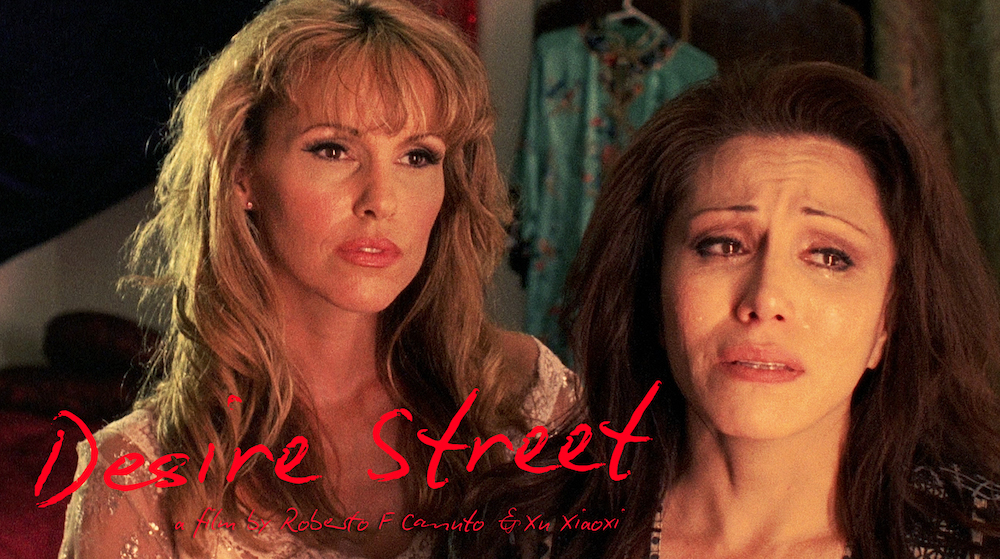
Alexandra Smothers and Alejandra Walker in a scene from Desire Street

Desire Street was filmed on Super 16mm film and principal photography lasted three and half weeks, taking place in August 2009, with temperatures reaching 110 °F (43 °C) and higher.

The directors' intentions behind Desire Street were to explore the elements of sex and desire as the main themes of the film. They tried to create characters that, under different circumstances, either repress these instincts (due to influences from the society, personal tragedies, etc.) or use it freely as the hooker does in the film.

Canuto and Xu take as a reference the Mexican melodramas of the 1960s. They exaggerate the representation of the characters to accentuate the irony that is a basic element in the story, creating many situations of comedy. At the end of the story the family became the main reference for the individual survival.

Desire Street has "a unique perspective, exploring social aspects and family issues with a melodramatic, but at times humoristic tone. This is conveyed with very bold and colorful characters and a dynamic narration. The message that the directors wish to bring to the film and its audience is a respect for others irrespective of their sexuality, race, or profession. Also the film highlights the importance of family support for any teenagers who are struggling with their sexuality and differences to the stereotypes that the society creates". The film touches themes like immigration, prostitution, homosexuality, lesbianism or bullying at a young age, themes that can be seen as controversial by the approach taken in the film.

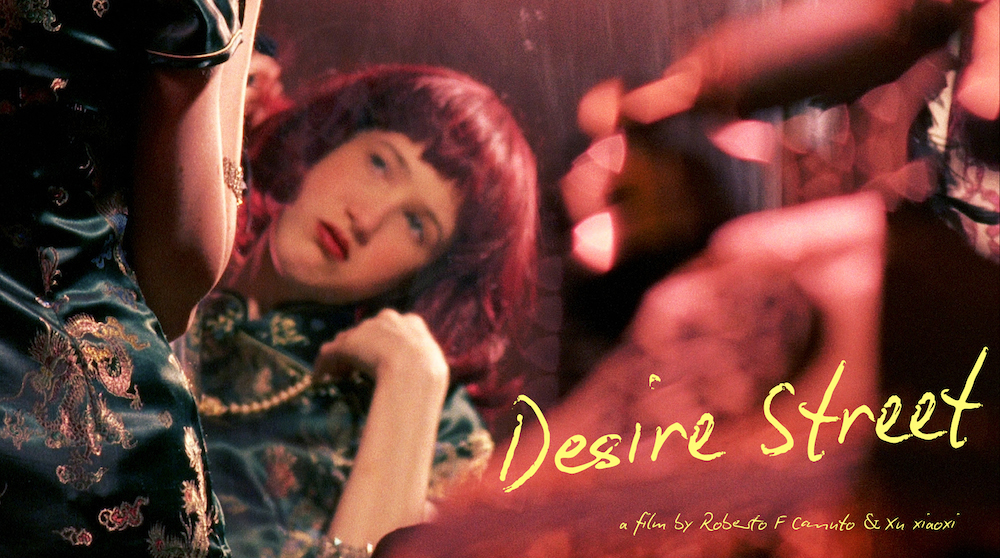
Ellen Clifford in a scene from Desire Street

== Reception ==
The film was well received in the film festivals where it was screened, including some awards. At the premiere in Mix Mexico International Film Festival 2011, Desire Street received a "Special Mention for Best Feature Film". The jury mention at the ceremony that the award was deserved due to "a very well structured script, strong story and great characters". In 2014 the film received two nominations and the award for Best Feature Film at the Asturian Film Festival (Festival De Cine Asturianu) 2014 in a ceremony celebrated at the Ateneo of Madrid. The jury highlight that Desire Street "develop, with technical mastery and a good treatment of the script, the generation gap and the family and sexual conflicts in a multiethnic society".

Desire Street critics reviews were also positive, highlighting the structure of the script and some film techniques, together with the actors performances:

∗ "...these characters could be from an Almodovar movie as they seem to need to behave in extraordinary ways in order to draw some sexual, psychological advantage...The use of subjective camera movement, composition and mirrored reflections are effective in conveying a real sense of false perceptions since the seeing is not real. Coupled with this is the technique of revisiting of previously seen scenes, but from a different perspective per time. This subversive type of shooting is not new to cinematography, but it is used to great effect in this application...The collaborations of Roberto Canuto and Xu Xiaoxi make them the future wave as these two engaging directors bring together fresh insight with redesigned camera work." from Dickie King at MTG, 2011 (South Africa).

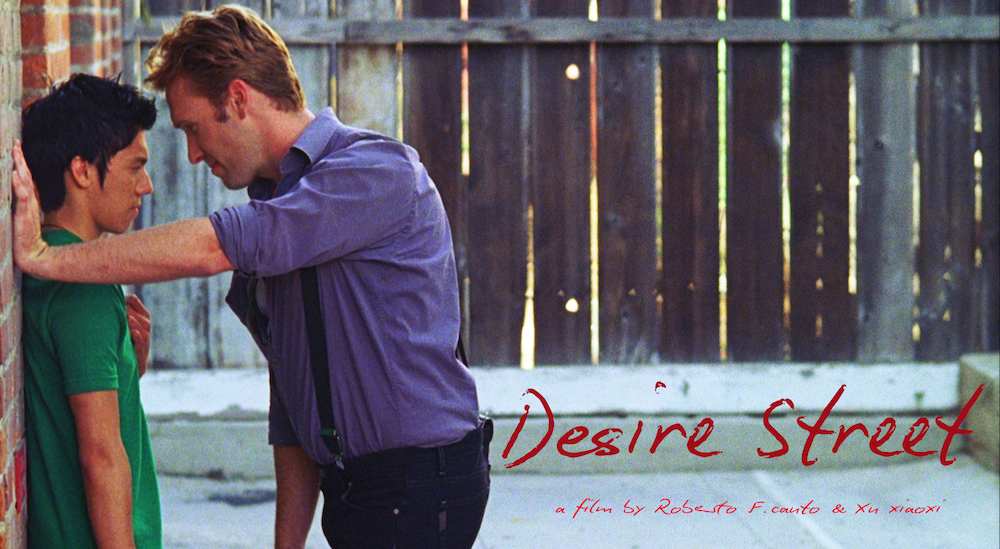
Javier Lopez and Kjord Davis in a scene from Desire Street

The premiere of Desire Street in Spain took place at the 9th Asturian Film Festival in June 2014, at a ceremony in Madrid at the historical Ateneo building. The film was awarded Best Film and one of the lead actresses, Alejandra Walker, received a nomination for her performing work.

The Chinese premier took place in August 2014 at the Contemporary Art Museum A4 in Chengdu (Sichuan), one of the most prestigious museums in China. It was part the exhibition ID/EGO, dedicated to the filmmakers, that include also a showcase of pictures and objects used during their shootings, and the presentation in China of their latest short film Ni Jing: Thou Shalt Not Steal (2013). Due to the very positive reactions and the good turnout in all the projections, the exhibition was extended for further weeks.

As of August 2014, the producers are in talks to sell distribution rights worldwide.

=== Awards ===
(Awards won are in bold)

- **Best Feature Film**, 9u Festival de Cine Asturianu (Spain), 2014
- Best Lead Actress - Alejandra Walker (Nomination), 9u Festival de Cine Asturianu (Spain), 2014
- Best Feature Film (Nomination), LesgaycinePTY, Panama International Film Festival, 2012
- **Best Feature Film - Special Mention**, Mix Mexico International Film Festival (Mexico), 2011
