= Cinco Saltos =

- City
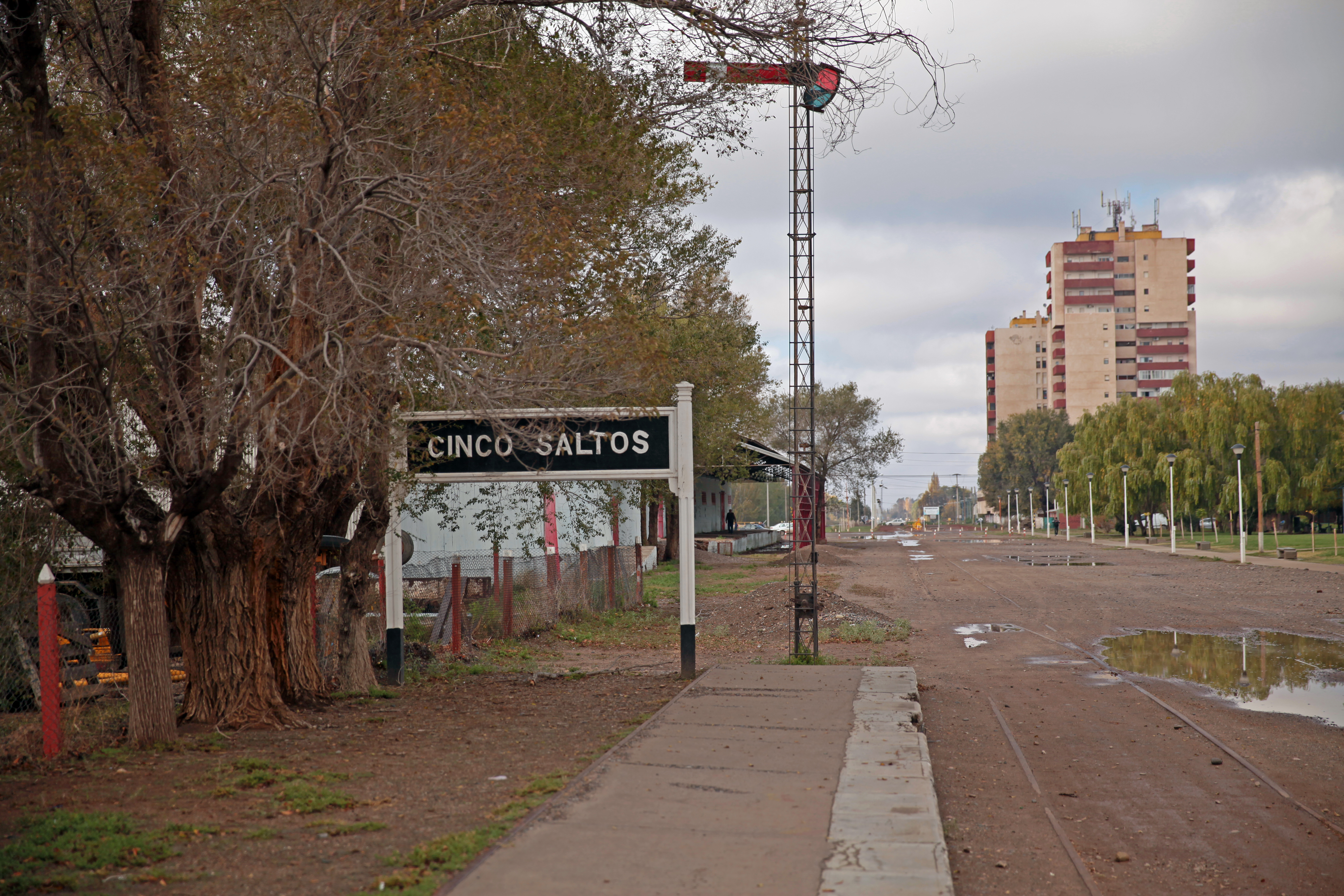

- Coat of arms

- Location of Cinco Saltos in Argentina
- Coordinates: 38°49′S 68°4′W
- Country: Argentina
- Province: Río Negro Province
- Department: General Roca

Population (2010 census)
  - Total: 22,790
- Time zone: UTC−3 (ART)
- CPA base: R8303
- Dialing code: +54 299
- Climate: BWk

Cinco Saltos is a city in the province of Río Negro, Argentina, located on the eastern side of the valley of the Neuquén River, near the Pellegrini Lake, about 20 kilometres (12 mi) northwest of Neuquén and 25 kilometres (16 mi) from Allen. It has 19,819 inhabitants as per the 2001 census [INDEC].

The name Cinco Saltos (literally "Five Waterfalls") refers to the five-level steps of the canal that starts upstream at the Ingeniero Ballester Dam and passes by the eastern limit of the city.

It is also host city of the annual La Picasa International Film Festival.

== History ==
The first settlers came to this land in 1914. At first, the layout of the town was made in the northern area of the railroad, but in 1918 floods covered the lots and prevented further building. On 16 September 1925, the Village Development Committee was formed. During the early years, the city did not have health care, only itinerant doctors. By 3 January 1960, the local rural hospital was founded, in presence of the then Governor Edgardo Castello. The city's growth was boosted by the creation of a caustic soda, chlorine and vinyl monomer production plant. This factory improved the income of ordinary workers and professional and it made it possible to build of the chemistry oriented Industrial School No. 1 Dr. Armando Novelli. However, it was ratified by several reports of CODEMA that the factory has caused pollution. Although in 1992 the company filed for bankruptcy, and in 1995 it closed, causing a large depression in the jobs positions, and emigration from the city. For 2004, the population began to increase due to the change in oil exploration and exploitation, using professionals in the city, and otherwise serving as a city of residence of the complex population Neuquén (Capital).

== Mystery ==
The town is also known as "City of Witches" due to its reports of witchcraft activity. There is a place called Bajo Negro where witchcraft is done. Paranormal occurrences of UFO sightings have also been reported in parts surrounding the Pellegrini and The Arroyones Lake. In 2009, an intact corpse of an 8- to 12-year-old girl who had died in the 1930s was found in a cemetery ossuary.

== Etymology ==
The town's original name was La Picasa, a horse hair Picaza baguala who roamed the area. Years later, at the opening of the railway station, it was named Cinco Saltos, referred to the falls of the canal that run near the same.

== Population ==
It had 17,739 inhabitants (INDEC, 2001), representing a decrease of 6.3% compared with 18,931 inhabitants (INDEC, 1991) the previous census. Cinco Saltos population has declined over the last two official censuses. For its population, Cinco Saltos held on 7th place in the province of Río Negro.

== Tourism ==
On 29 April 2009, Cinco Salto’s community shared the longest apple pie in the world, which was 201 meters. This was organized to benefit the local volunteer firefighters and it was baked by the prestigious baker Osvaldo Gross in honor to the province’s most important fruit, the apple. In the following year, the giant apple pie was baked again. This time it reached 258 meters and included 10 meters of gluten free dough. In 2011 the apple pie was baked for the first time in a different city, this one being Buenos Aires.

== Notable citizens ==
- Andrés Fabián Lasagni, PhD in materials science, chemical engineer, focuses on the development of technologies using laser radiation.
