= Ingeniero Ballester Dam =

Coordinates: 38.725833°S 68.173056°W

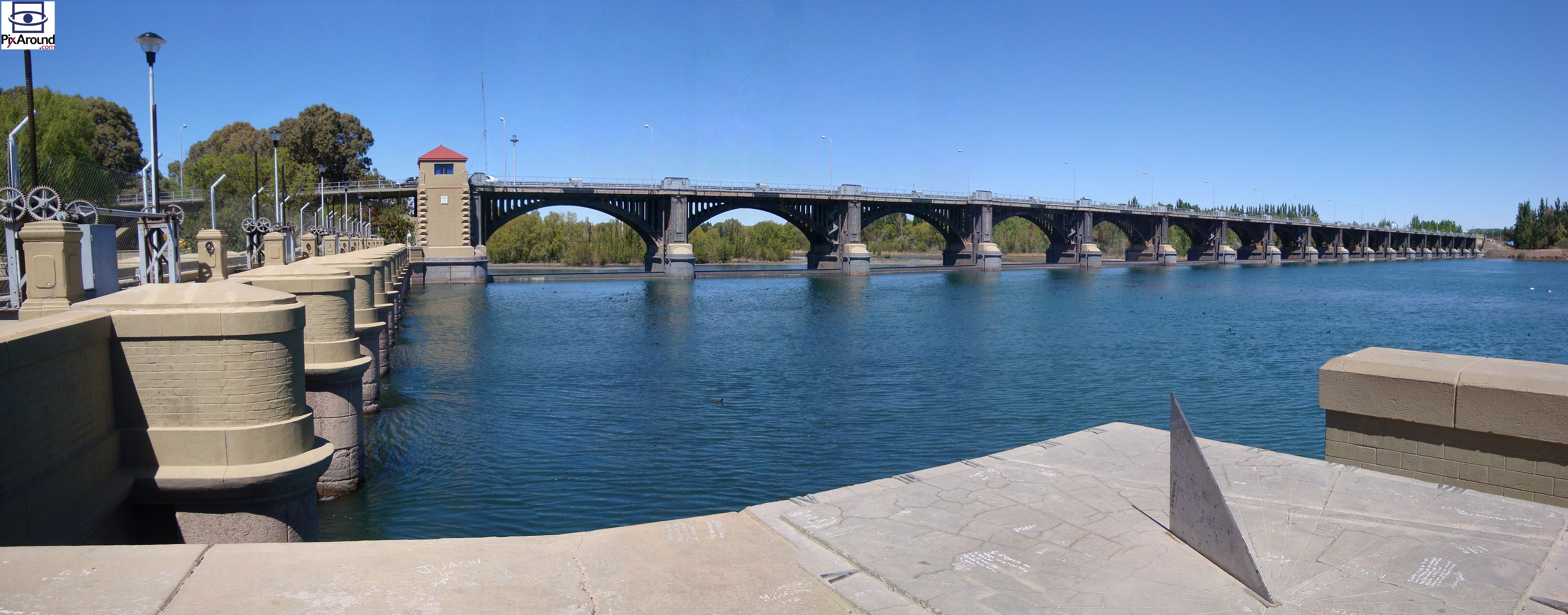
Ingeniero Ballester Dam in 2011

The Ingeniero Ballester Dam is a dam on the Neuquén River, in the Argentine Patagonia. The top of the dam doubles as a road bridge.

The dam is located near the town of Barda del Medio, province of Río Negro, downstream from the El Chañar Dam (the last part of the Cerros Colorados Complex), and 25 kilometers (16 miles) from north-northeast from the city of Neuquén.

Work began on the bridge on 1 January 1910. Completed in 1918, the dam is used to re-route part of the flow of the Neuquén River to a long irrigation canal which flows east and then southeast passing by the cities of Barda del Medio, Cinco Saltos, Cipolletti, Allen, General Roca, Ingeniero Luis A. Huergo, and Villa Regina, and then emptying into the flood plain of the Río Negro. A second derivation dam, downstream on the canal, sends water to feed the reservoir of the Pellegrini Lake.

The Ballester Bridge over the dam is 400 meters (1,300 feet) long and 5 meters (16 feet) wide. National Route 151 crosses over it from Río Negro to the province of Neuquén.
