= Barda del Medio =

Coordinates: 38°43′S 68°10′W

- Municipality and village
- Interactive map of Barda del Medio
- Country: Argentina
- Province: Río Negro Province
- Department: General Roca
- Municipality: Contralmirante Cordero

Government
  - Mayor: Héctor Galli, PJ
- Elevation: 961 ft (293 m)

Population (2001)
  - Total: 1,524
- Time zone: UTC−3 (ART)
- Postal Code: 8301
- Area code: 0299
- Climate: BWk

Barda del Medio is a village and municipality in Río Negro Province in Argentina. It is located northwest of the province of Río Negro, in the General Roca department, to the north of Patagonia. The population of Barda del Medio is 6.5 km from the municipality of Contralmirante Cordero, along National Route 151, and is under its jurisdiction.

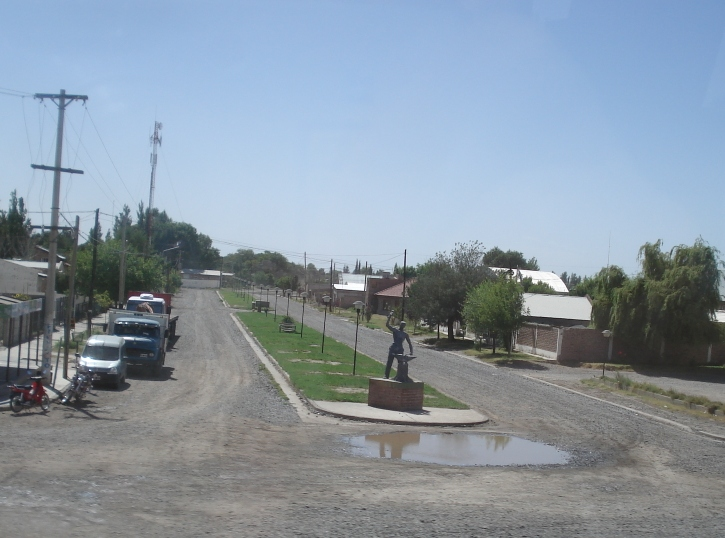
Monument at the entrance to Barda del Medio.

== Location ==
Barda del Medio is located on the left bank of the Neuquén River, opposite the Neuquén village of Vista Alegre. Dique Ballester and Isla de Manzano are located a few meters from the town center. Because the branch of the river that separated the island from the Río Negro territory dried up, it lost its status as an island and is now reclaimed by Río Negro.

It is accessed from Cipolletti, 28 km via National Route 151 and from Neuquén by Provincial Route 7.

== Population ==
Barda del Medio had 1524 inhabitants (INDEC, 2001), representing an increase of 19.3% compared to the 1277 inhabitants (INDEC, 1991) of the previous census.
