= La Picasa International Film Festival =

International festival of independent films held in Argentina

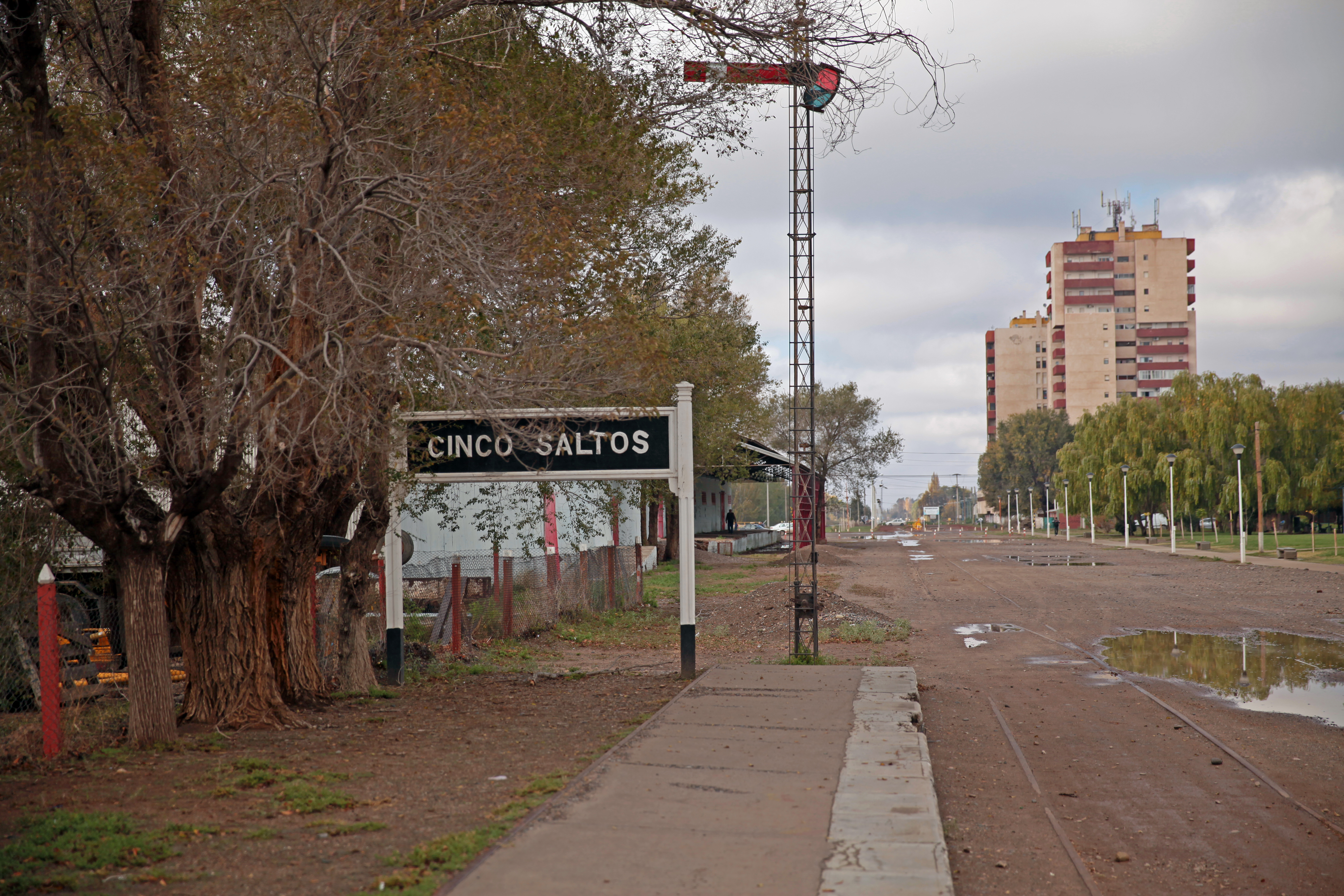
- Location: Cinco Saltos, Argentina
- Founded: 2018
- Language: International
- Website: Filmfreeway website

The La Picasa International Film Festival (FICILP, Spanish: Festival Internacional de Cine La Picasa) is an international festival of independent films organized each year in the month of February, in the city of Cinco Saltos, Argentina.

The festival is managed by Linea Sur Cine, the Cinco Saltos County, with the collaboration of the Río Negro Province. It was founded in 2018 by Ivan Iannamico (artistic director) and José Sepúlveda.

Since 2019 Daniela Caruzzo took the reins of the general production of the festival, orienting it to regional film production and the union with other Patagonian festivals.

== History ==
It was founded on February 1, 2018 by Iván Iannamico, born in Viedma and raised in Cinco Saltos, and José Sepúlveda, also a native of the city. The Festival was self-funded and organized by Linea Sur Cine, the Spanish Theater of Cinco Saltos, the Cooperative La Estrella and Radio Ciudad 94.5. In addition to the 5 categories in competition, a series of short films titled "Spain Present" were screened honoring the Spanish society of the region.

In its second edition, the FICILP was supported by Aymara Rovera, who acted as godmother. The actress and director born in the city of Cutral Có (Neuquén), known for her co-lead in the film Nordeste by Juan Diego Solanas which was screened at the 2005 Cannes Film Festival, released her series Aimé. The festival added a new category: Regional Fiction. There were also two additional series of short films out of competition, "Women's Cinema" and "Homage to Mexican Cinema".

== Awards ==
The FICILP has six categories in competition: Regional, National and International Fiction, Documentary, Animation and Horror. Each one of these categories offers a "Short Film Winner", along with the Festival's "Best Short Film" and "Fan Favorite." The jury for Fiction categories in its first edition was composed by directors and producers Cecilia Guerrero (Neuquén), Juan Flores (Gral. Roca) and Walter Ponzo Ferrari (Fernandez Oro); and for Documentary, Animation and Horror: Rocío Barrero (Centenary), Bruno Mogni (VIEDMA) and actor Ariel Gigena (Buenos Aires). In 2019, it was composed by Aymara Rovera, Federico Palma and Lucía Ravanelli (Buenos Aires) for the categories Regional and International Fiction and Horror; while National Fiction, Documentary and Animation was once again conformed by Walter Ponzo Ferrari and Bruno Mogni, along with director Laura Linares (Bariloche).

=== List of winners ===
Year	Winners
2018	Best Short Film: Chique, by Lucía Ravanelli (Argentina); Fan Favorite: Behind, by Ángel Gómez Hernández (Spain); Best National Short Film: Chique, by Lucía Ravanelli; Best International Short Film: Les Miserables, by Ladj Ly (France); Best Latin American Short Film: María, by Vini Campos (Brazil); Best Documentary Short Film: Skeikima, by Raquel Larrosa (Spain, Western Sahara); Best Animated Short Film: Areka, by Atxur Animazio Taldea (Spain); Best Horror Short Film: Hay algo en la oscuridad, by Fran Casanova (Spain)
2019	Best Short Film: My Little Goat, by Tomoki Misato (Japan); Fan Favorite: Adela, by Evangelina Montes (Argentina); Best Regional Short Film: Bienvenida Soledad, by Bia Baldín; Best National Short Film: La cura del espanto, by Mariana Rojas; Best Script: Eva, by Ezequiel Forte (Argentina); Best International Short Film: Sunken Plum, by Xu Xiaoxi and Roberto F. Canuto (China, Spain); Best Latin American Short Film: Casa Pareada, by Ronald Pereira (Chile); Best Documentary Short Film: Majur, by Rafael Irineu (Brazil); Best Animated Short Film: My Little Goat, by Tomoki Misato (Japan); Best Horror Short Film: 9 Pasos, by Marisa Crespo and Moisés Romera (Spain)
