= Allen, Río Negro =

Allen
- City
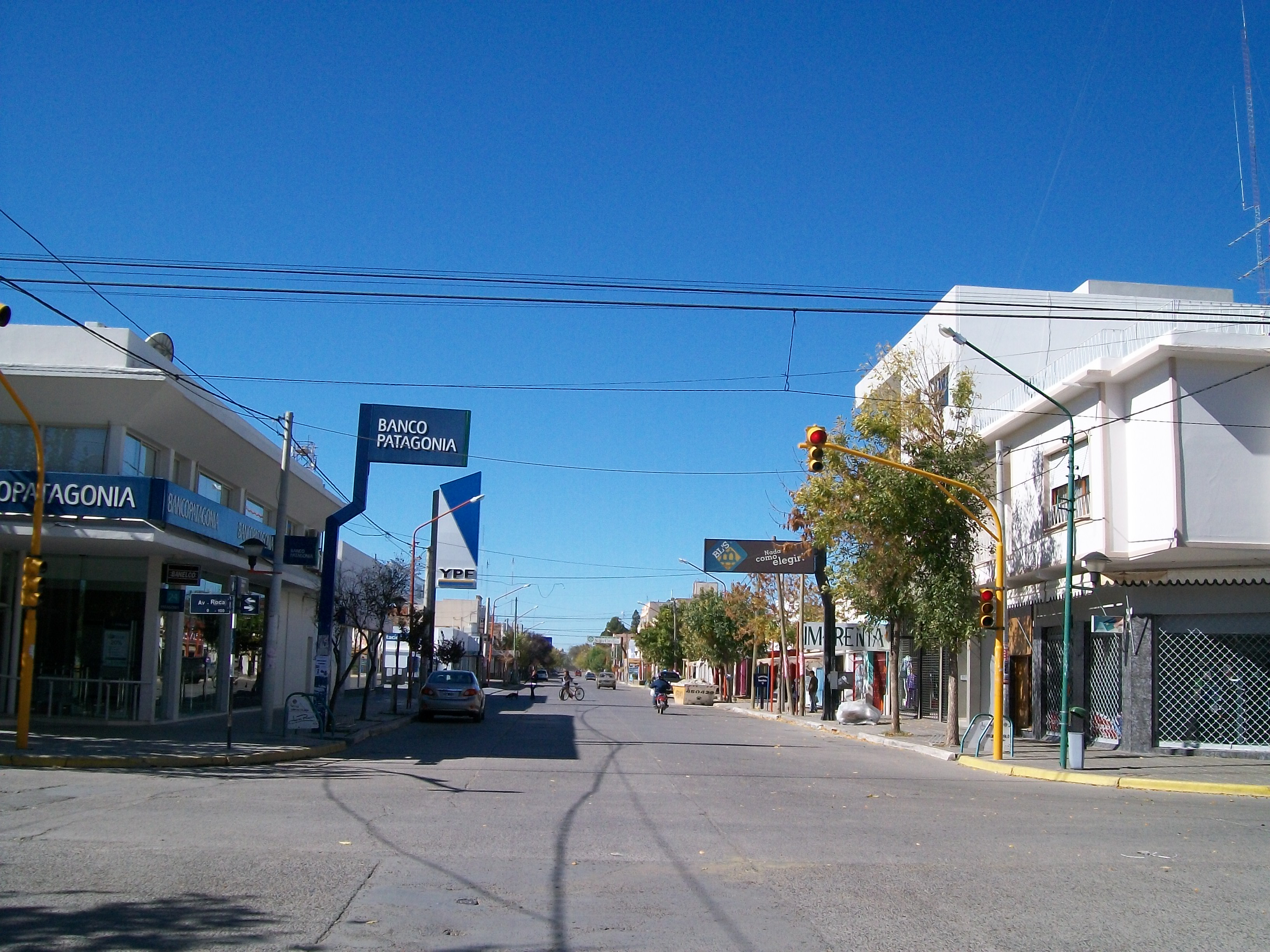
- Downtown Allen

- Location of Allen in Argentina
- Coordinates: 38°58′S 67°50′W
- Country: Argentina
- Province: Río Negro Province
- Department: General Roca

Government
- Elevation: 256 m (840 ft)

Population (2010 census)
  - Total: 22,859
- Time zone: UTC−3 (ART)
- CPA base: R8328
- Dialing code: +54 2941
- Climate: BWk
- Website: <>

Allen is a city in the province of Río Negro, Argentina. It has 26,083 inhabitants as per the 2001 census [INDEC]. It is located on the left-hand (northern) side of the Alto Valle of the Río Negro, near its beginning in the confluence of the Neuquén and Limay rivers, about 20 km (12 mi) west of General Roca and 35 km (22 mi) east of Neuquén.

Allen was founded on 25 May 1910 by Patricio Piñeiro Sorondo. Its name was an homage to British engineer Charles Allen, a local landowner and member of the Gran Ferrocarril Sur railway company, who managed the construction of the city's train station.

The city is divided in half by a canal born in the Ingeniero Ballester Dam that brings water for irrigation from the Neuquén River. Its main traditional economic activity, which continues to be the most important, is the fruit industry. Allen is the National Capital of the Pear, hosting an annual National Festival of the Pear, and the seat of the Río Negro Fruit Market.
