= Sunken Plum =

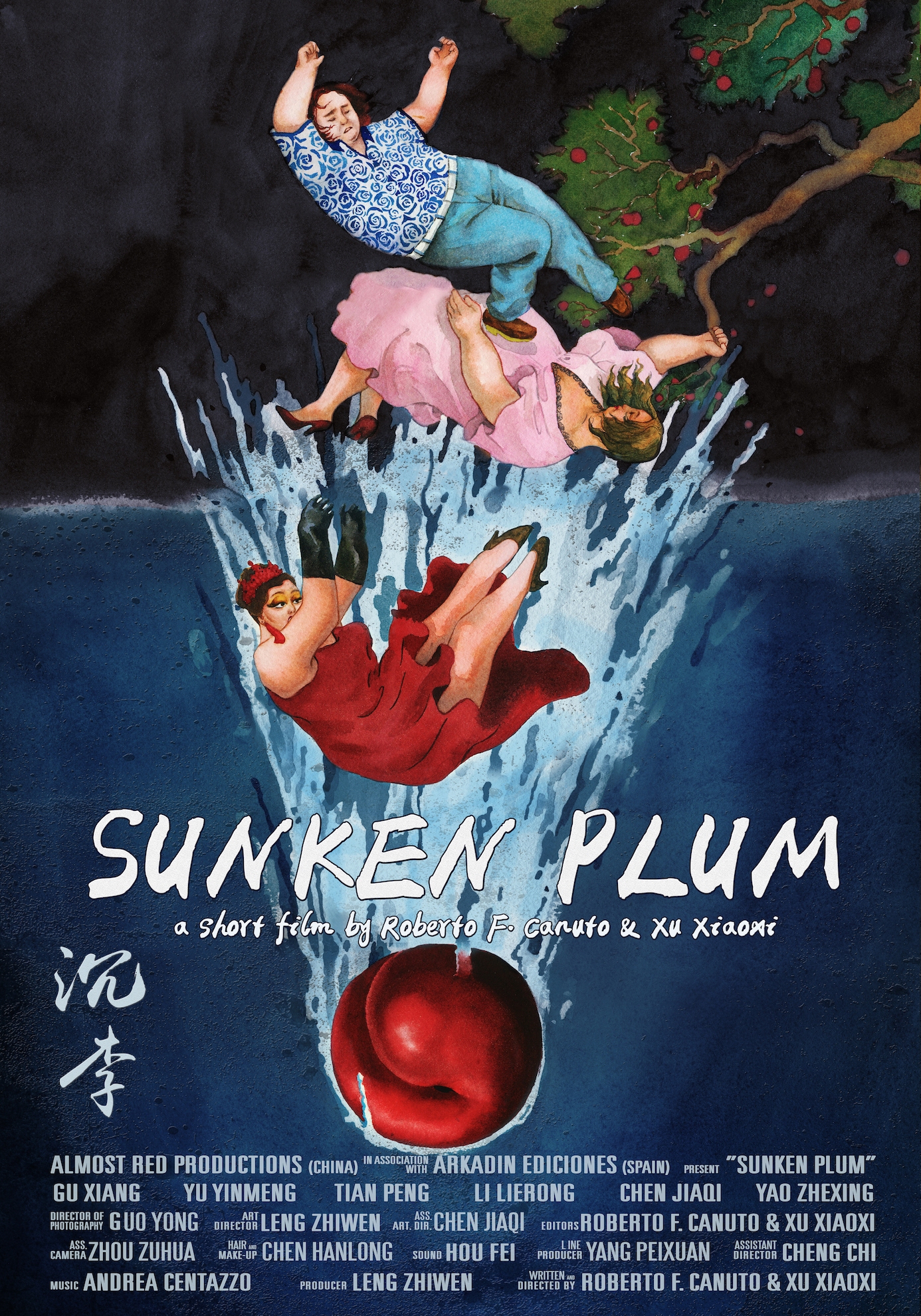
- Sunken Plum (Chen Li) international poster
- Directed by: Roberto F. Canuto; Xu Xiaoxi
- Written by: Roberto F. Canuto; Xu Xiaoxi
- Produced by: Leng Zhiwen
- Starring: Gu Xiang; Yu Yinmeng; Tian Peng; Li Lierong; Chen Jiaqi; Yao Zhexing; Zhang Zhijiu
- Cinematography: Guo Yong
- Edited by: Roberto F. Canuto; Xu Xiaoxi
- Music by: Andrea Centazzo
- Production company: Almost Red Productions
- Release date: 24 October 2017
- Running time: 20 minutes
- Countries: Spain; China
- Languages: Mandarin; Sichuanese Dialect

Sunken Plum (Original Chinese: 沉李; pinyin: Chen Li; lit. 'sunken plum') is a Chinese and Spanish drama short film written and directed by Roberto F. Canuto and Xu Xiaoxi and produced with the collaboration of Chinese companies. It was produced by Almost Red Productions in association with Arkadin Ed. and filmed in Sichuan, China.

Sunken Plum is the final part of the trilogy Invisible Chengdu (aka El Chengdu Invisible (Spanish)), a series of short films shot in Sichuan (China) and using the local dialect, Sichuanese Mandarin. The trilogy centers around the underground scene of Chengdu. It includes the films Floating Melon (2015) and Ni Jing: Thou Shalt Not Steal (2013) and follows stories about characters that usually are ostracized and that must survive in the shadows of the city, since the Chinese society is contrary to diversity and individuality.

Set in a contemporary city of China, Sunken Plum follows Li Wanjing, a transgender woman that must return to her home village in the mountains after learning of the death of her mother, since she must arrange the funeral, but cannot out her identity in front of family members and friends. The film stars Gu Xiang, a non-professional actor that faced his first performance with the movie. Supporting roles are played by Yu Yinmeng, who performed in a previous film of the directors, Floating Melon, Tian Peng, and Li Lierong.

Sunken Plum aims to portray the life of the transgender community in Chinese society. Of the motivation behind film, director Robert F. Canuto said We hope that with time things will start to change and these groups start to get the respect and rights that they deserve.. In Sunken Plum they try to represents some of the many difficulties that have a transgender woman in China. If focuses in the family relationships and the different treatment they receive between the cities and the villages.

Filming took place in September and October 2016 in Sichuan (China), and the post-production process was completed in October 2017 in Asturias, Spain. Sunken Plum was distributed by Laboral Cinemateca, a company from the government of Principado de Asturias, and had its premiere at the 62nd Seminci, Valladolid International Film Festival on the 24 of October 2017. It was shown also in Spain at the 22nd LesGaiCineMad, Madrid International LGBT Film Festival and the 55th FICX, Gijón International Film Festival, where obtained the "Laboral Cinemateca Award", that consist in the distribution of the movie at international film festivals.

The international premiere took place in April 2018 at the 9th LGBT film festival in Poland. In the following six months, it was shown in over 25 countries, participating in two festivals that qualify for the pre-selection of the Academy Awards (Oscar) for Best Short Film: the 36th Outfest Los Angeles Film Festival and the 26th Raindance Film Festival in London (UK), The film obtained various awards and mentions through the year 2018.

== Cast ==
- Gu Xiang (Chinese: 顾翔) as Li Wanying/ Li Yong/ Mimi
- Yu Yinmeng (Chinese: 余吟萌) as Wang Dandan
- Tian Peng (Chinese: 田鹏) as Guo Xiang
- Li Lierong (Chinese: 李烈蓉) as Mum
- Chen Jiaqi (Chinese: 陈家琪) as Cui Xian
- Yao Zhexing (Chinese: 姚哲行) as Manager
- Zhang Zhijiu (Chinese: 张智久) as Kiki

== Plot ==
A transgender woman, working in a Chengdu nightclub, receives an unexpected visit from her cousin who tells her that her mother (whom she had not visited for a long time) is dead. As the only son, she feels obligated to return to her birthplace, but can not appear as a woman in front of her family.

== Pre-Production ==
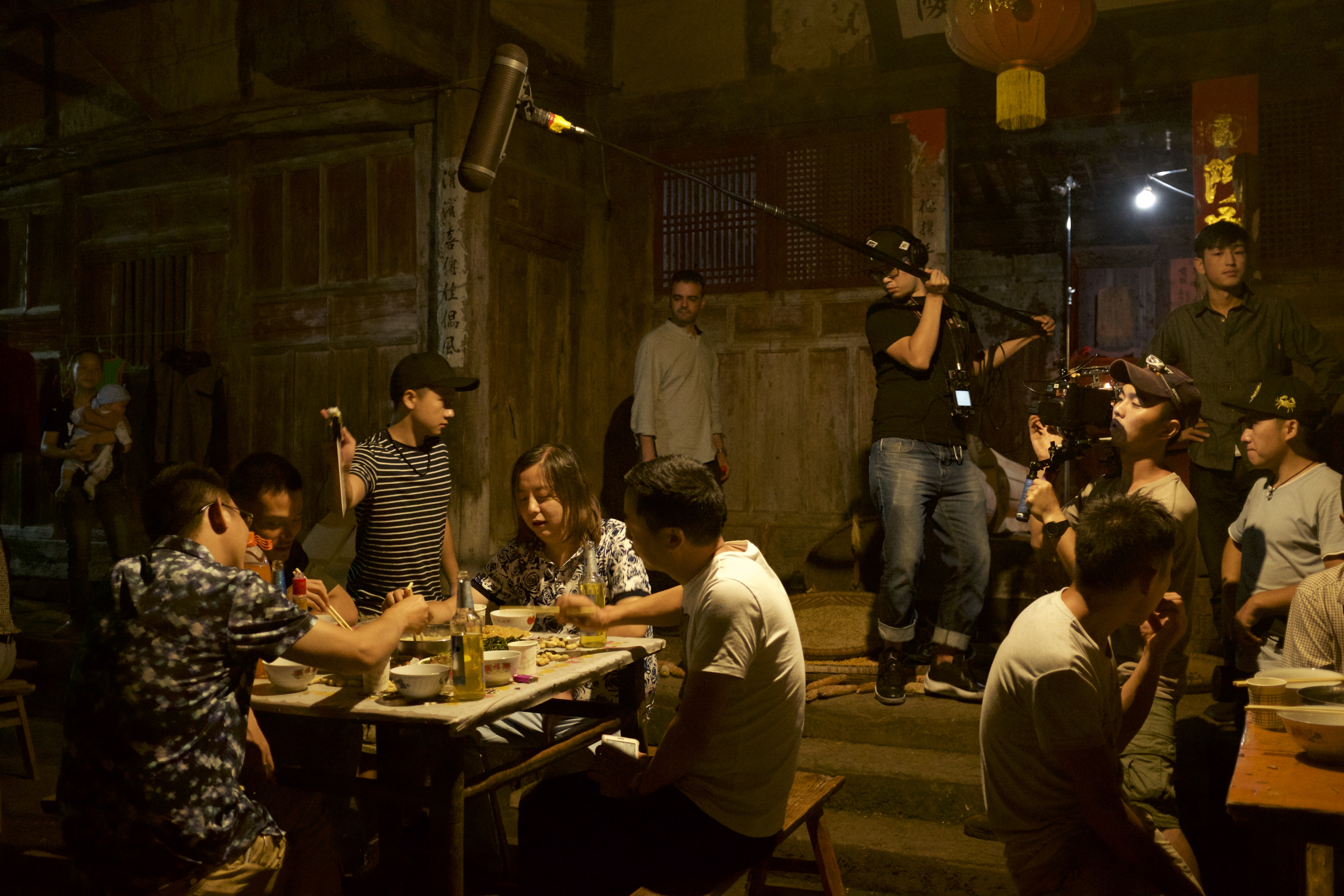
Picture of Sunken Plum (Chen Li) with directors and main actors

The films start the pre-production process in summer 2016. The directors mention that "The production process was very complicated because it was not possible to obtain help from official institutions, neither from private funds because this type of works cannot have a normal distribution in China". It was partially financed by a crowdfunding project. "Many people collaborate, knowing that our intention was to bring attention towards the difficulties and the injustice that the LGBT community and in special the trans community suffer in the Chinese society. For that reason, this project is very special for us".

Produced by Almost Red Productions in association with Arkadin Ed (Spain), the filming took place in China. Being a co-production, in the practice, it is just a Spanish film, not only because the main founds of the film came from Spain, but also because the film cannot be distributed in China, due to the strict censorship of the audiovisual exhibition in the country.

=== Writing ===
The script was written by the directors, Roberto F. Canuto and Xu Xiaoxi. The idea behind the story came after the directors viewed videos that were shared on Chinese social networks, and then censored a few hours later. The videos portrayed the physical and psychological abuse of some transgender women. The directors mention: "we were surprided that these videos were shared in a playful and entertaining manner. Knowing the great difficulties that this community must face to have a dignified life, lacking legal protection and suffering the contempt of a good part of society, we decided to write this story to draw attention to this unfair situation".

According to the directors, the objective of the film was "a story with a simple and direct narrative, but with an important emotional charge, so that the viewer feels empathy with the main character and understands her inner world. Our wish would be that this short film could be seen both by the kind of people who shared those videos for fun, as well as by the archetype of people who are represented in the village, who are completely unaware of the existence of transsexuality and, therefore, they can not accept it".

== Production ==
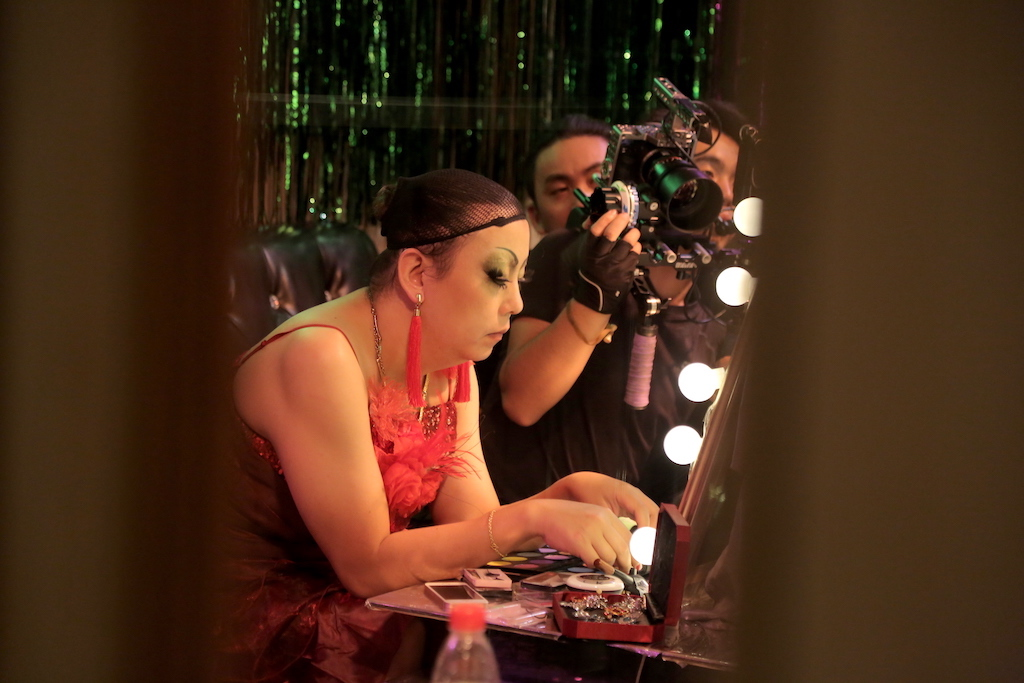
Picture of Sunken Plum (Chen Li) with main actor Gu Xiang

The filming process of Sunken Plum took place between the middle of September until 9 October 2016 in Sichuan (China).

=== Location ===
The locations of the filming were the center of Chengdu, the lake "Bai Ta" and a village in the mountains of Sichuan, "Nan Bu". The main problem regarding setting was finding a suitable village that allow the production team to shoot a scene related to funerals. Superstitions surrounding the dead are very strong in the countryside of China. The village used, "Bai Ta", is located five hours from Chengdu in the mountains, and the team needed to drive dangerous roads to reach the remote area.

=== Casting ===
Sunken Plum was performed by non professional actors and some scenes required many extras. The leading role was played by the male actor Gu Xiang, who took on the complex character, "Li Wanying", a transgender woman with strong family conflicts. Regarding the casting process, director Roberto F. Canuto mentions that they “try to find a transgender actress to perform the main role, but it was not possible. Finally, we choose a non-professional actor, but that had some of the qualities and the passion that we were looking for, and we thought he would give a true personality and spontaneity to the role”. Gu Xiang interviewed transgender women and rehearsed the scenes for months with the directors until he felt ready to commence filming.

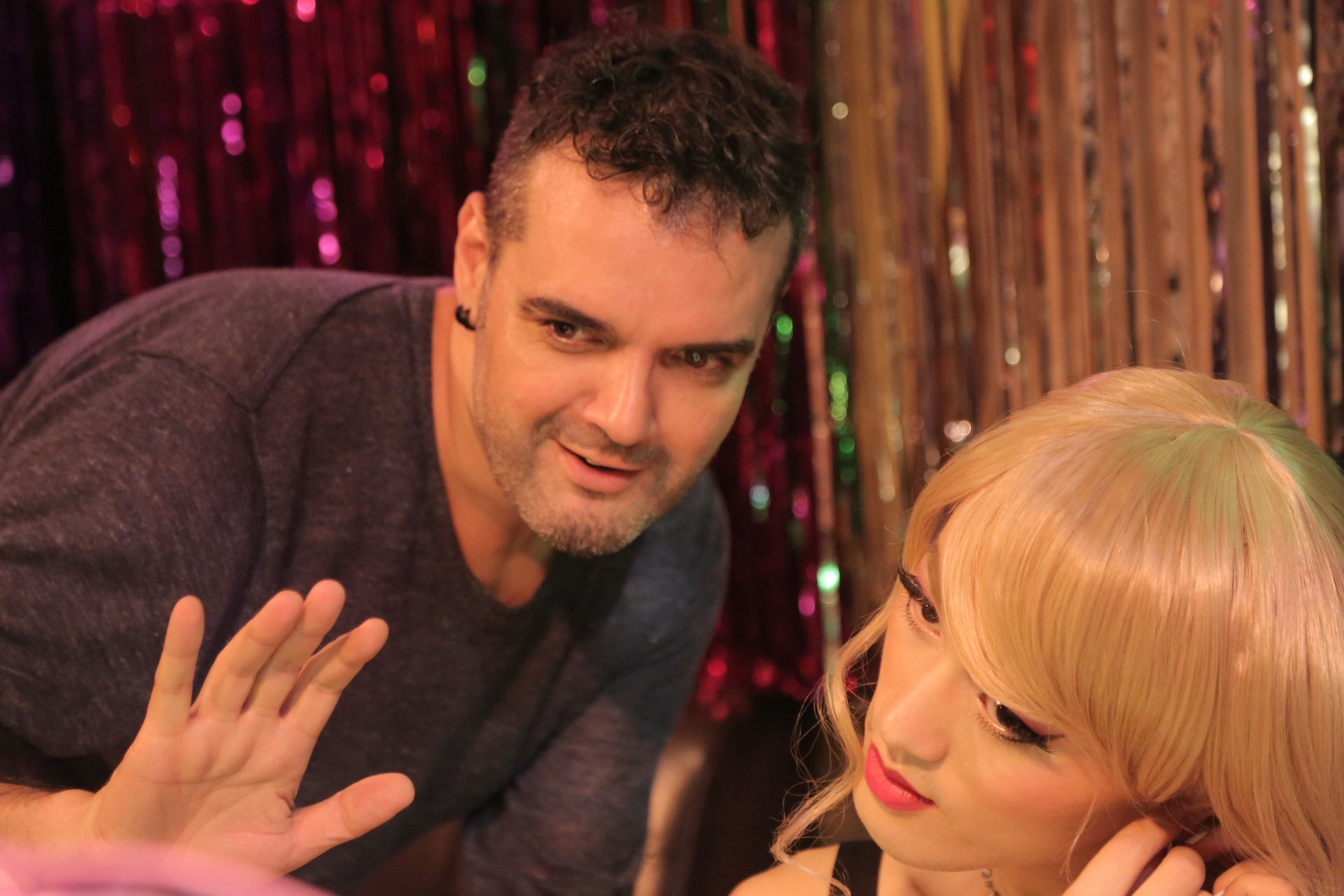
Picture of Sunken Plum (Chen Li) with director Roberto F. Canuto and actor Zhang Zhi.

=== Crew ===
Among the members of the crew it had usually collaborators of the directors, like the producer Leng Zhiwen and the director of photography Guo Yong, with whom they already collaborate in their previous Chinese short film, Floating Melon.

The music will be composed by the multi-awarded Italian-American composer Andrea Centazzo, being Sunken Plum the seventh collaboration with the directors.

== Release ==
The world premiere and national release of the film took place on the 24 of October 2017 at the 62 SEMINCI, Valladolid International Film Festival, and the international premiere in April 2018 at the 9th LGBT film festival in Poland. In the first twelve months since the premiere, it was screened in over 60 national (Spain) and international film festivals and obtained various awards and nominations. Among the festival, the Academy Awards qualifiers for best short film, Outfest in Los Angeles and Raindance Film Festival in London (UK).

== Awards and screenings ==
(Awards won are in bold)

- **Laboral Cinemateca Shorts Award**. 55th Gijón International Film Festival (Spain)
- Nominated Best Short Film. III GAVA Awards 2018 (Spain)
- **Best Short Film**, Asturian Journalist Award. 17th Aviles Accion Film Festival (Spain)
- **Best Short Film LGBT**. 15th Alicante Film Festival (Spain)
- **Best Actor** (Gu Xiang) - 5th Requena y Acción Short Film Festival (Spain)
- **Best International Short Film, Special Mention**. 9th KASHISH Mumbai International Queer Film Festival (India)
- **Best Actor, Special Mention**. 9th KASHISH Mumbai International Queer Film Festival (India)
- **Best Short Film**. 10th ShanghaiPRIDE Film Festival (China)
- Nominated Best Film. 10th ShanghaiPRIDE Film Festival (China)
- **Best Narrative Short/ Best Story**.6th Brighton Trans Pride Film Night (England)
- **Best International Short Film**. 2nd La Picasa International Film Festival (Argentina)

=== Festival screenings ===
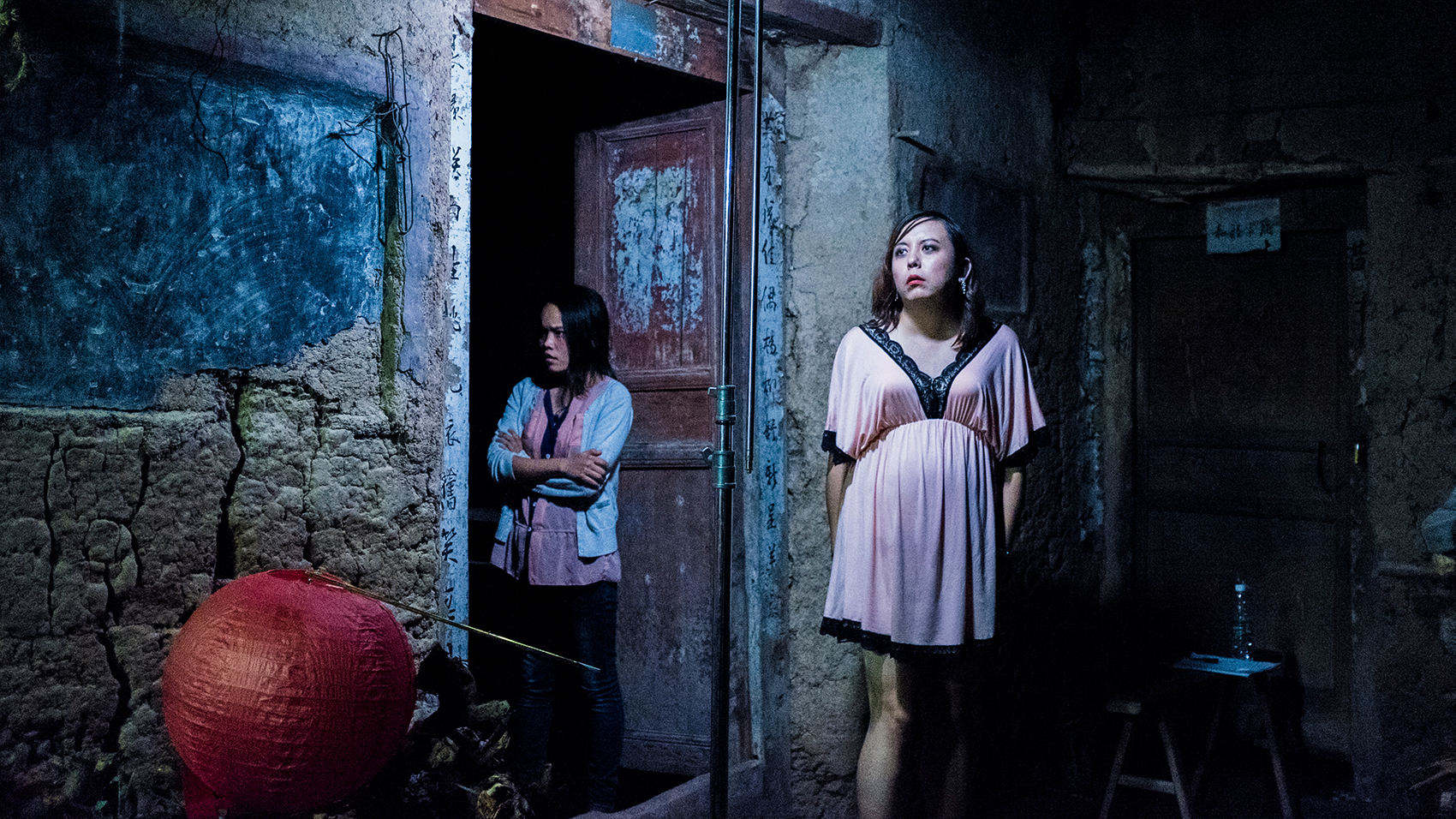
Sunken Plum with actors Gu Xiang and Yu Yinmeng

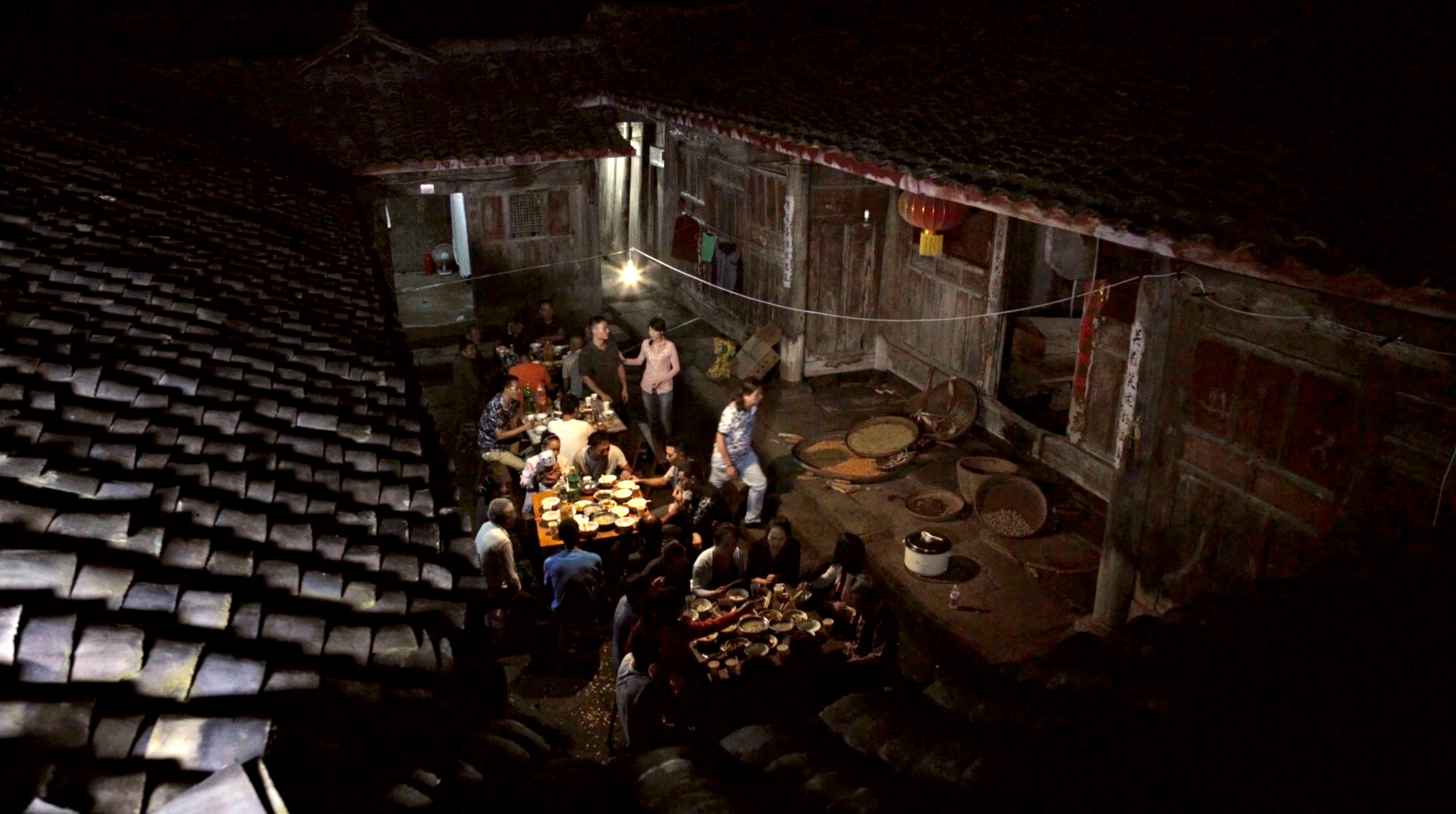
Sunken Plum shooting

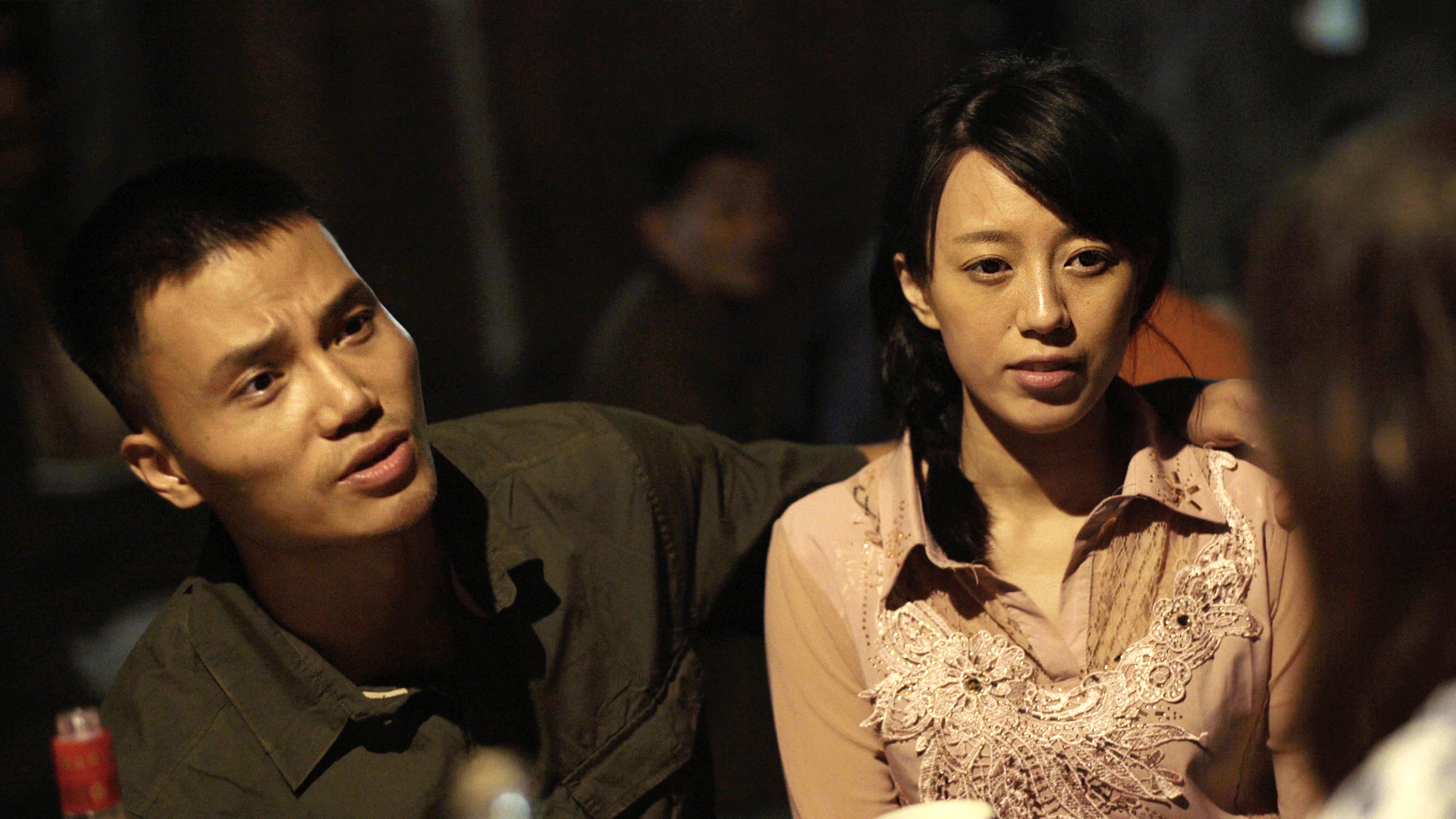
Sunken Plum with actors Tian Peng and Chen Jiaqi

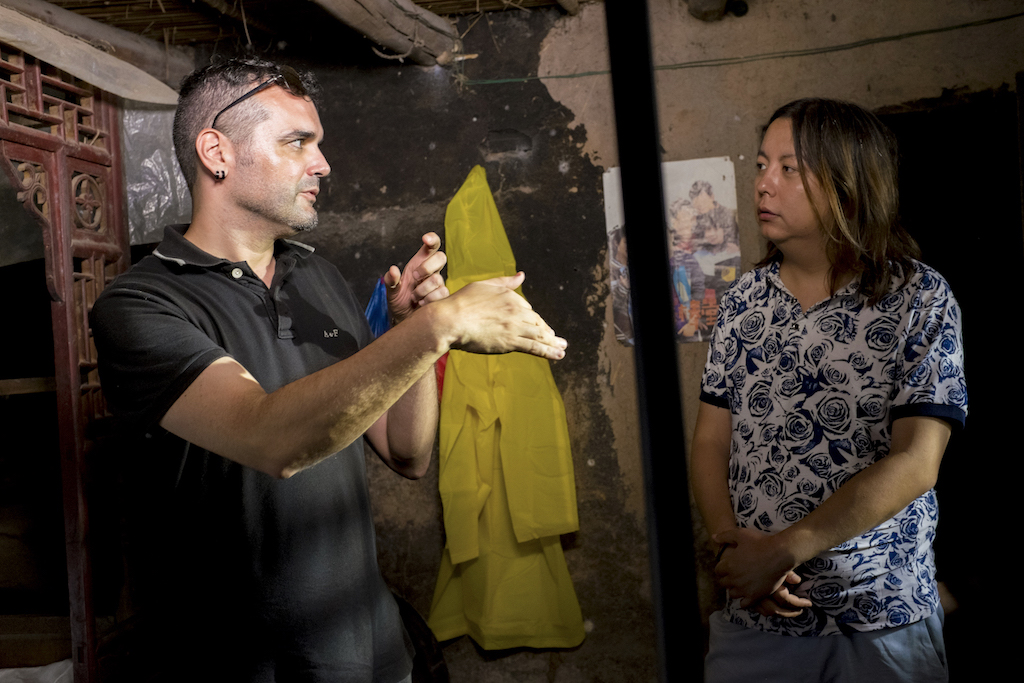
Sunken Plum with director Roberto F. Canuto and actor Gu Xiang

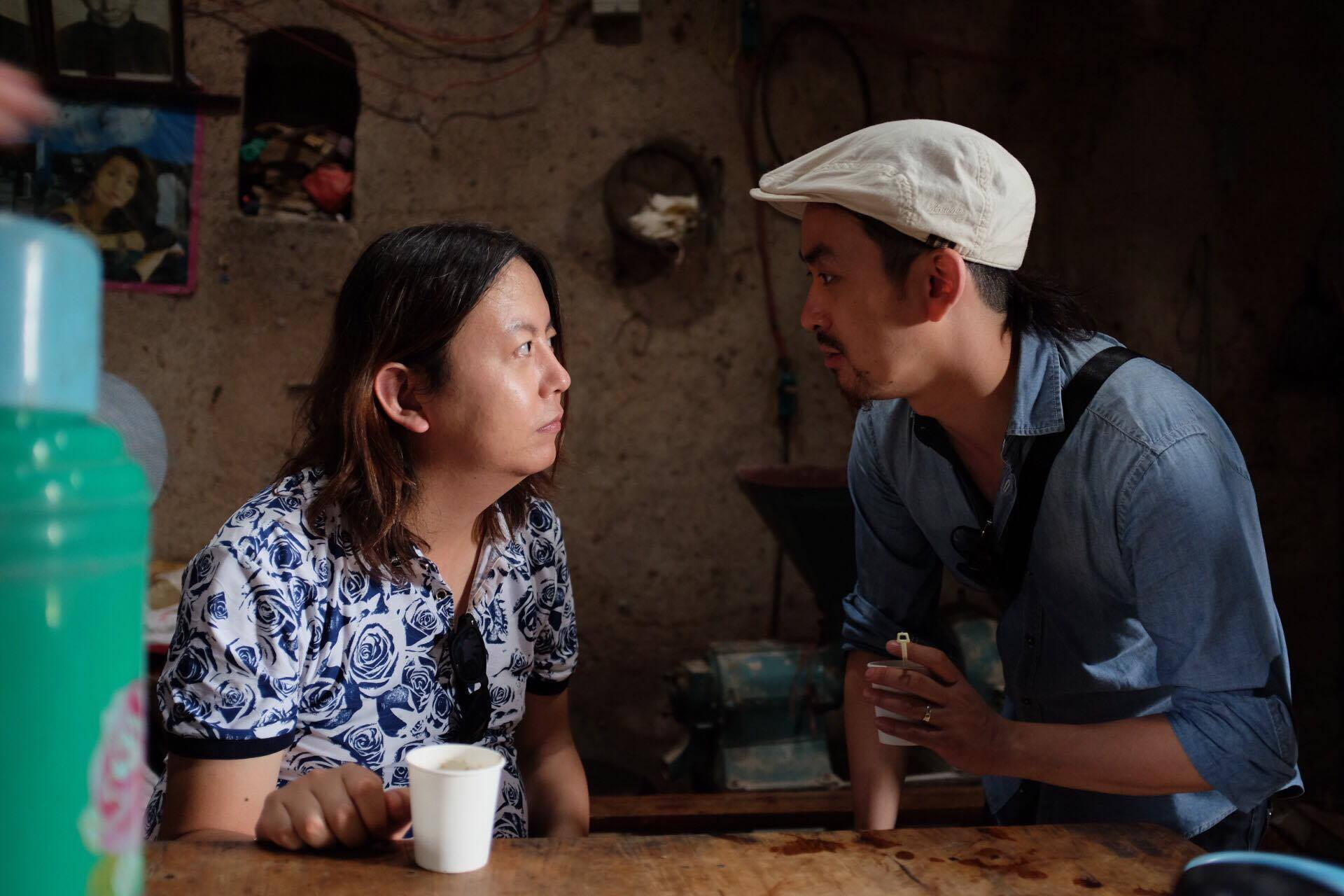
Sunken Plum with director Xu Xiaoxi and actor Gu Xiang

The film participated in over 60 international film festivals.

International screenings (starts in April 2018)

- Europe:
  - 26th Raindance Film Festival in London (England)
  - 16th Florence Queer International Film Festival (Italy)
  - 9th LGBT Film Festival (Poland)
  - 1st CISFF, Cyprus Indie Short Film Festival (Cyprus)
  - 6th Brighton Trans Pride Film Night (England)
  - 25th OpenEyes International Filmfest (Germany)
  - 21st Motovun International Film Festival (Croatia)
  - 4th Marmaris International Short Film Festival (Turkey)
  - 27th Vinokino International Film Festival (Finland)
- America:
  - 36th Outfest Los Angeles LGBTQ Film Festival (United States)
  - 10th Reel Out Charlotte Film Festival (North Carolina, United States)
  - 14th Paraguay LesBiGayTrans Int. Film Festival of Asunción (Paraguay)
  - 15th OutfestPeru, LGBTI Int. Film Festival of Lima (Peru)
  - 13th Shorts México, International Short Film Festival (Mexico)
  - 1st Diverso Cinema, Festival International of LGBT Cinema in Cartagena (Colombia)
  - 3rd Queer Film Festival of Santander (Colombia)
  - 5th Playa del Carmen International Queer Film Festival (Mexico)
- 'Asia:
  - 29th Hong Kong Lesbian & Gay Film Festival (Hong Kong)
  - 9th KASHISH Mumbai International Queer Film Festival (India)
  - 10th ShanghaiPRIDE Film Festival (China)
  - 6th Reel Desires Chennai International Queer Film Festival (India)
  - 2nd Hanoi International Queer Film Week (Vietnam)

National screenings

- 'Spain:
  - 62nd SEMINCI, Valladolid International Film Festival
  - 21st Málaga Film Festival, Cine en Español
  - 55th FICX, Gijón International Film Festival
  - 31st Medina International Film Festival
  - 30th Alfas del Pi Short Film Festival
  - 22nd LesGaiCineMad, Madrid International LGBTQ Film Festival
  - 17th Avilés Acción Film Festival
  - 15th Alicante Film Festival
  - 5th “Requena y Acción” Short Film Festival
  - 18th Radio City Int. Short Film Festival of Valencia
  - 9th Cerdanya International Film Festival
  - 17th El Pecado, International Short Film Festival
  - 16th FESCIGU, Solidarity Film Festival of Guadalajara
  - 2nd Donosskino, Donostia Short Film Festival
  - 15th FECISO, Social Cinema International Festival of Castilla-La Mancha
  - 7th Riu Rau Film Festival
  - 15th GLT Film Festival (Basque Country)
  - 18th Cinhomo, International LGBT Film Festival
  - 23rd FIRE!!, Barcelona LGBT Film Festival
