= Pellegrini Lake =

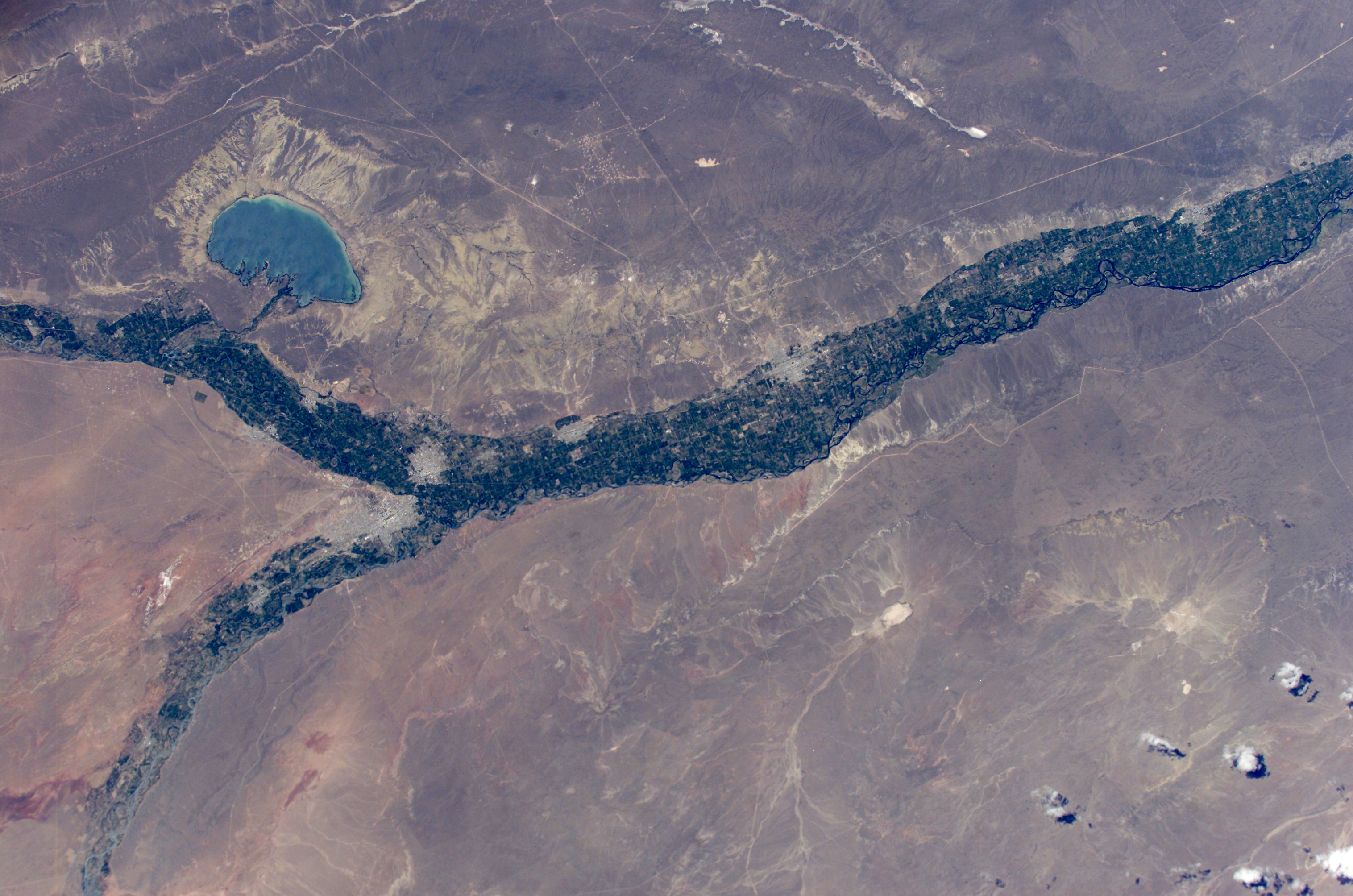
- The lake (left) from space

- Location within Río Negro Province
- Location: General Roca Department, Río Negro Province, Argentina, in Patagonia
- Coordinates: 38°40′S 68°00′W
- Type: artificial lake
- Basin countries: Argentina
- Surface area: 112 km^{2} (43 sq mi)
- Average depth: 9.4 m (31 ft)
- Max. depth: 18 m (59 ft)
- Surface elevation: 270 m (890 ft)

The Pellegrini Lake is an artificial lake located on the Argentinian Patagonia, in the province of Río Negro, near the city of Cinco Saltos, at approximately 38°40′S 68°00′W and 270 m above mean sea level.

This reservoir was originally a natural depressed area, possibly excavated by wind erosion, which was later filled with water brought by a derivation channel from the nearby Neuquén River, in order to regulate its flow (since the river had no natural lakes that would fulfill this function). It has mean and maximum depths of 9.4 and 18 m, respectively. It covers an area of 112 km^{2} and has a volume of 1.053 billion m^{3}.

The lake is employed for commercial fishing of trucha criolla (Percichthys trucha, a species of temperate perch) and pejerrey (Odontesthes microlepidotus, a neotropical silverside), as well as sport fishing, recreation and tourism.

== Tourism ==
The tourism can make a little detour of 14 km from the National Route 151, which travels to and from the South region. Pellegrini lake is an important water mirror, which is part of the irrigation work of the Alto Valle of Rio Negro, that is fed from the canal that rises from the imponent dam, Dique Ingeniero Ballester. This canal runs 120 km and gives life to the fruit production that characterize the region. At the Pellegrini lake you can do the most diverse watersports such as swimming, windsurfing, canoeing and sailing. Also you can do different bird sightings and especially have some rest to disconnect from the city life.

== Technical data provided by the D.P.A ==
The Pellegrini lake occupies a natural depression known as the “Cuenca Vidal”.

It is created up to the construction of the dam Dique Ing. Ballester, which started in 1915 the diversion of excess irrigation water through the canal regulator “Arroyón” and as a measure to mitigate the large floods of the Río Neuquén through a bypass canal.

The Pellegrini lake is an endorheic basin, without a natural water outflow to another basin, so its waters are slightly saline. The bottom level of the lake is 251 m.s.n.m.

After the first years of operation of the dam Dique Ing. Ballester, in 1936, the lake that was formed already registered a water level of 267,60 m. Up to this date, that level has small variations around the 272 m elevation.
