= Roberto F. Canuto =

Spanish film director and screenwriter

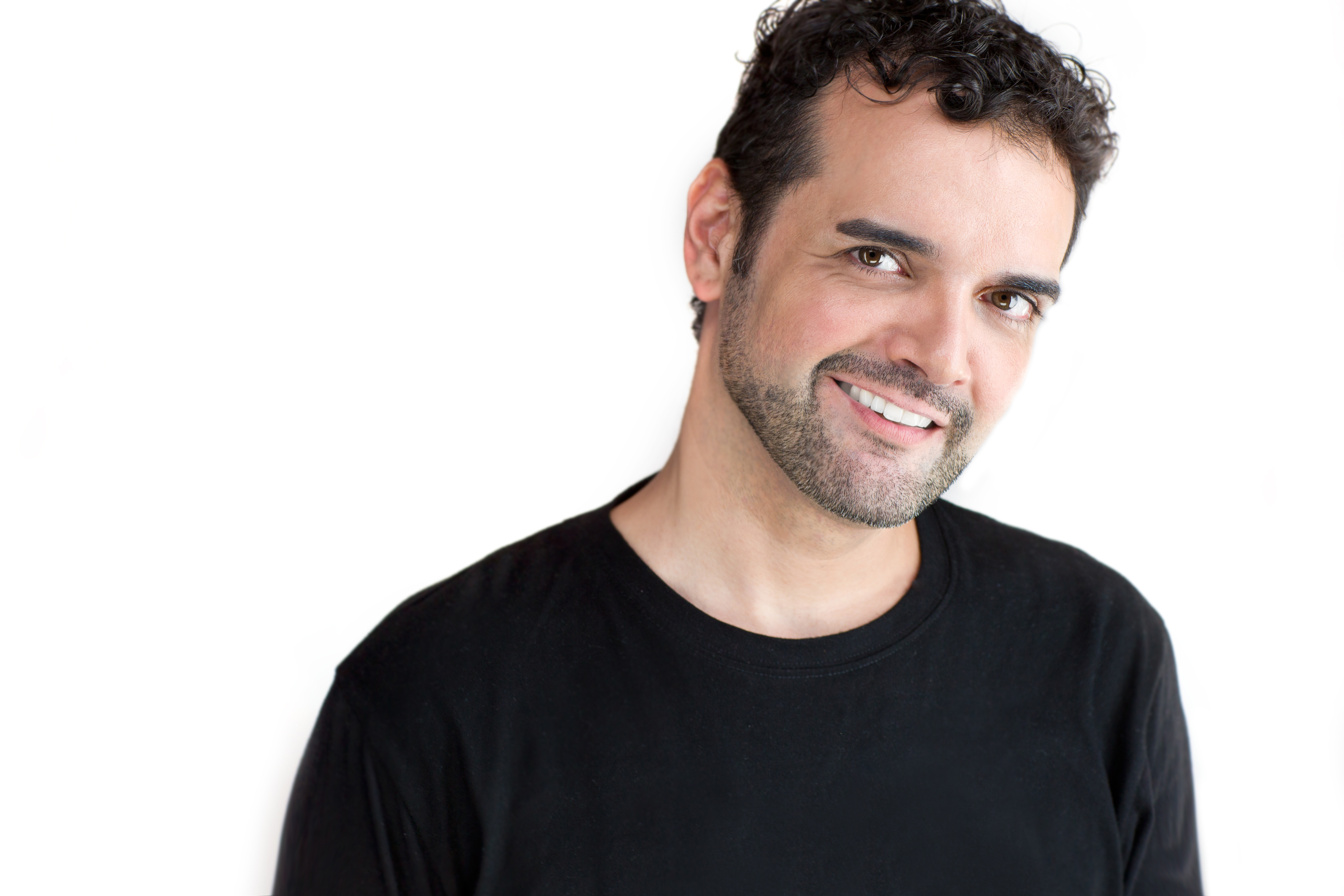
- Headshot 2013
- Born: Roberto Fernandez Canuto; 13 April 1973 (age 53); Gijón, Asturias, Spain
- Education: CCII at Complutense University of Madrid; MFA at NYFA - Los Angeles MFA
- Occupations: Film director, filmmaker, screenwriter
- Years active: 2009–present
- Notable work: Advent; Floating Melon; Desire Street; Ni Jing: Thou Shalt Not Steal; Toto Forever

Roberto Fernandez Canuto (born 13 April 1973) is a Spanish film director and screenwriter. He belongs to a new generation of filmmakers from Spain with learning or working experiences internationally and with multicultural influences. Roberto F. Canuto is one of the first European directors to establish stable collaborations within the Chinese industry. Since 2010 he co-directs all his films with the Chinese director Xu Xiaoxi and together open a film production company in China, Almost Red Productions.

Even still at an early stage of his career, Roberto obtains international recognition as all his films have been selected and awarded in many international film festivals. Due to the themes treated and the distinct style of his films, Roberto F. Canuto is considered in some circles as a promise and a director to follow.

== Biography ==
Roberto F. Canuto was born on 13 April 1973 in Gijón in Asturias, Spain. Since an early age he was curious about filmmaking. He remembered watching The Jungle Book at a movie theatre when he was 5 and asking his family about the process of making a movie. During his childhood he studied music and obtained degrees in Piano, Harmony and other related subjects at the "Royal Conservatory of Music of Asturias" (Spain) and participated in a short acting course at the "Superior Dramatic Art School of Asturias" in 1989. It was during these years when he discovered independent films from US and authors from Europe and, according to the director: "that was probably the moment when I decided that my dream was to follow my storytelling passion".

He studied Arts in Audiovisual Communication at Madrid's Complutense University and in 1998 he obtained a bachelor's degree (Licenciate) specializing in Filmmaking. He organized film seminars at the cinema room of his Hall of Residence "Empresa Pública", but his first attempts to direct shorts were frustrated.

After he visited London and spent 8 years working as a chef and a representative of companies as Prada and Calvin Klein. Frustrated with his life style and having a job that focus only in monetary gain, he decided to give up everything, travel to Los Angeles and enrol in a Master of Fine Arts (MFA) - Filmmaking at the New York Film Academy, that allowed him to be in contact with filmmaking again. He graduated in 2009 with the feature film "Desire Street".

From 2008 he starts to collaborate with Xu Xiaoxi, and some of these films receive awards at film festivals. During the two years of study in US, Roberto directs over 14 short films in celluloid and digital formats and collaborates in more than other 20 shorts covering different crew member positions, from Cinematographer to Script Supervisor, allowing him to know the profession inside out. His two graduation projects became the most successful films, "Toto Forever" (Year One graduation) and the feature "Desire Street'", co-directed with Xu Xiaoxi (Master graduation). Both projects received "Best Film" awards. "Desire Street" at "Asturian Film Festival 2014" and "Special Mention" for "Best International Feature" at "Mix Mexico International Film Festival 2011" and "Toto Forever" at "LesgaycinePTY, International Film Festival of Panama", together with other awards, nominations and special screenings.

During the years of study in Los Angeles, the directors start the collaboration with the composer Andrea Centazzo, Italy's top orchestral percussionist. An artist known for his ability to "synthesize Oriental percussive vibration with timbales understanding of Contemporary Music and the soul of jazz and rock." Andrea Centazzo composed the scores for all their films since then: Mei Mei (2009), Toto Forever (2010), Desire Street (2011) and Ni Jing: Thou Shalt Not Steal (2013).

In 2011 Roberto decides to travel to China and start a film career there, combining the western and eastern culture in his work. Together with Xu Xiaoxi founded officially their own production company, Almost Red Productions, where they alternate the fiction narrative projects with commercial/advertisement works.

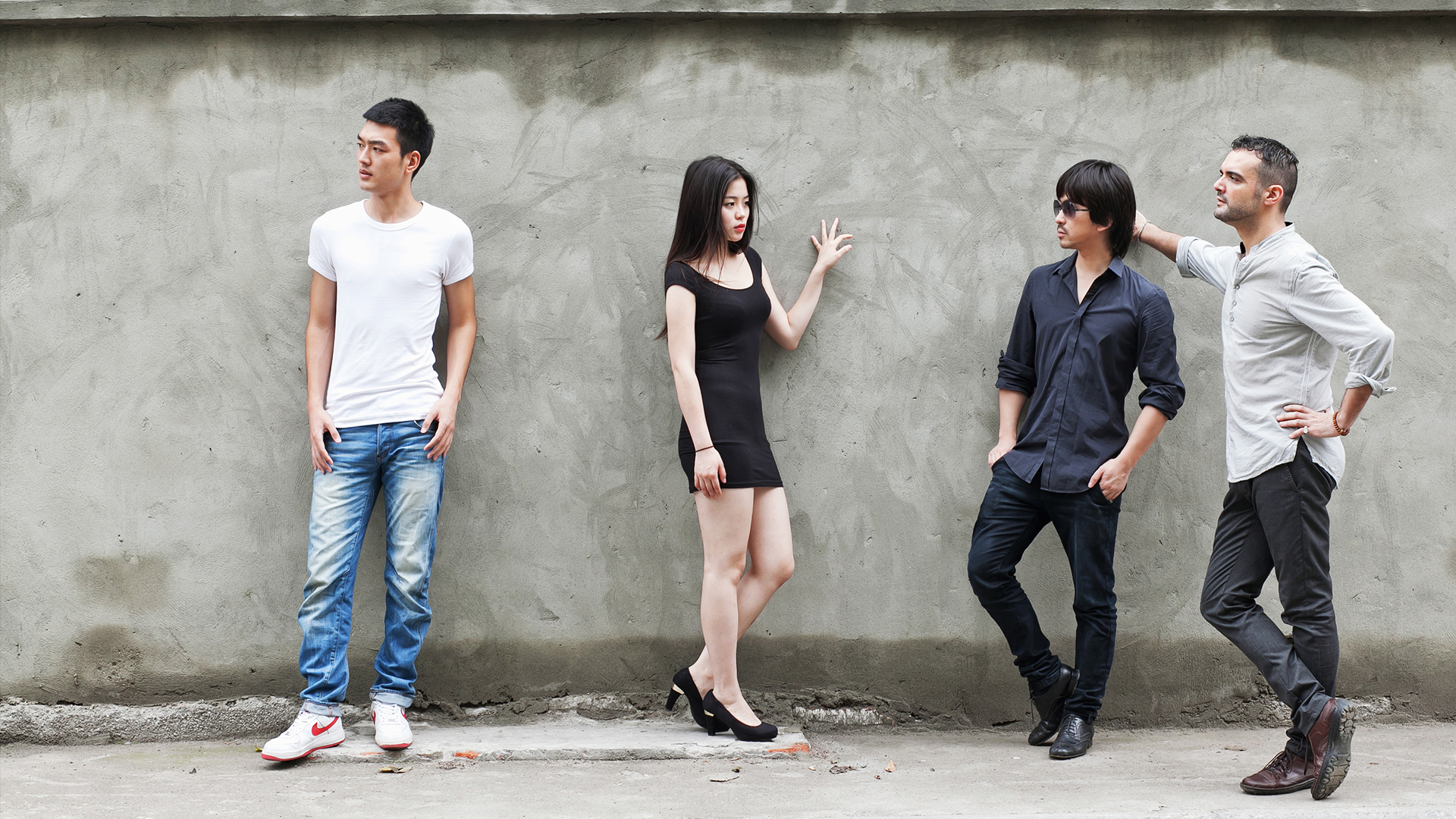
Directors Roberto F. Canuto and Xu Xiaoxi with main actors of Ni Jing, Xia Ruihong and Wan Yinhui

In 2013 released the Chinese-Spanish production short film "Ni Jing: Thou Shalt Not Steal", film that obtained awards for Best Film (Riverside Saginaw International Film Festival, Michigan, USA), Best Actress Sherry Xia Ruihong and Runner up Short (Asturian Film Festival, Spain) together with other nominations, like the GAVA awards for "Best Short" and "Best Screenplay".

Almost Red Productions collaborates with some organizations, like "Concentric Circles ", a non-profit company that aim to improve the health system in poor Rural Areas of China.

In August 2014 the Contemporary Art Museum A4 in Chengdu (Sichuan), one of the most prestigious museums in China. organised an exhibition titled ID/EGO, dedicated to the filmmakers Roberto F. Canuto & Xu Xiaoxi, that included a showcase of pictures and objects used during their shootings and the presentation in China of Desire Street and their latest short film Ni Jing: Thou Shalt Not Steal (2013). The exhibition had a very positive reactions and a very good turnout in all the projections. Due to the success, the exhibition was extended for further weeks.

In 2015 present the film Floating Melon and introduced the project as the second part the trilogy, "Invisible Chengdu", that will include Ni Jing: Thou Shalt Not Steal (2013), Floating Melon (2015) and Sunken Plum (a new productions to be presented in 2017).

Floating Melon was shot in Chengdu (China) with non professional actors. The film premiered in Spain at the 53rd FICXIXON, Gijón International Film Festival in November 2015 and in China at the Art Gallery Shujingtang Alley Art Space in Chengdu (Sichuan) in June 2016. It received the Audience Award at the 15th Aviles Acción Film Festival (Spain) and the Audience Choice Award and Best Cinematography Award (Guo Yong) at the III Asturian Film Festival of Proaza 2016 (Spain). In the first 12 months after the release it has been presented in over 40 international film festivals in Europe, America, Asia and Africa.

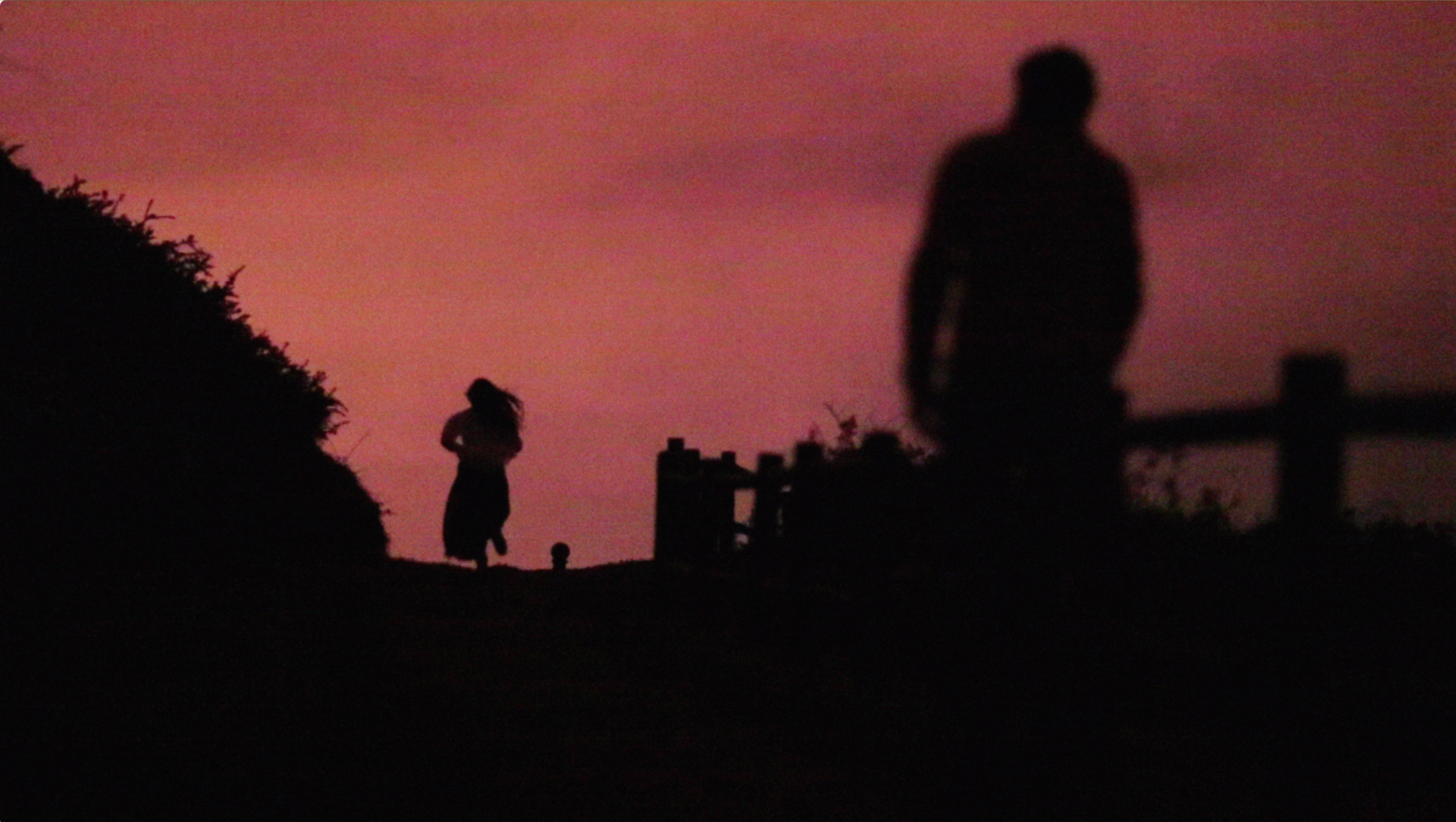
Picture of the film Advent (film)

The following year, in 2016, Roberto F. Canuto directs his first film in Spain, in Asturias (his hometown), using the language of the region, the Asturian language, titled Advent (Ad-vientu), a psychological mystery drama film. The world premiere of Advent took place at the 54th Gijón International Film Festival on 25 November 2016 and the film obtained the Audience Award Dia D'Asturies for Best Short Film.

His new film, Sunken Plum, will be released in 2017. It completes the trilogy "Invisible Chengdu". It is a melodramatic comedy with touches of mystery and social realism (with a mix genre typical of the directors). The film uses non professional actors and the filming took place in Sichuan (China), mainly in Chengdu City Center, the lake "Bai Ta" and a remote village in the mountains of Sichuan, "Nan Bu".

Roberto lives between his working place in Chengdu (China) and his hometown in Asturias (Spain).

== Filmography ==
Roberto F. Canuto, while attending the Master of Fine Arts at NYFA, directs many shorts as "Me Inside Me", "Lila" or "Our Sweet New Home", but most of them remain unreleased. His graduation films, the short "Toto Forever" and the feature "Desire Street" (co-directed with Xu Xiaoxi), are the works that bring more attention, awards and international recognition. In China, produced by Almost Red Productions, he co-directs with Xu Xiaoxi in 2013, "Ni Jing: Thou Shalt Not Steal" that attracts media attention, with press interviews and TV coverage. They release in 2015 "Floating Melon" and englobe both films, together with their new film "Sunken Plum" in a trilogy that they call Invisible Chengdu. Back in Spain, in 2016 he release Advent (Ad-vientu), spoken in Asturian language.

=== "Invisible Chengdu" trilogy (2017) ===
Invisible Chengdu (aka El Chengdu Invisible (Spanish)) is a Roberto F. Canuto and Xu Xiaoxi trilogy of short films filmed in Sichuan (China) and using the local language of the region, the Sichuanese Mandarin. This set of films reflects the underground scene of Chengdu. It includes "Sunken Plum" (2017), "Floating Melon" (2013) and "Ni Jing: Thou Shalt Not Steal" (2013). The trilogy tell stories about people normally segregated and that have to survive in the shadows of the Chinese society, that is against diversity and individuality.

=== Sunken Plum (2017) ===
Sunken Plum (Original Chinese: 沉李; pinyin: Chen Li; lit. 'sunken plum') is Roberto F. Canuto and Xu Xiaoxi's latest short film, to be released in 2017. Produced by "Almost Red Productions" (China) in association with "Arkadin Ediciones" (Spain). It is a melodramatic comedy with mystery elements and tells the story of a transgender woman who works in a nightclub in Chengdu. Unexpectedly, she gets a visit from her cousin who tells her that her mother (whom she didn't sees for a long time) is deceased. As the only son, she feels obligated to return to her birthplace, but can not appear as a woman in front of her family.

The film uses non professional actors and it was partially produced with a Crowdfunding project. The filming process took place in October 2016 and the postproduction is expected to be completed in Spring/Summer 2017.

=== Advent (Ad-vientu) (2016) ===
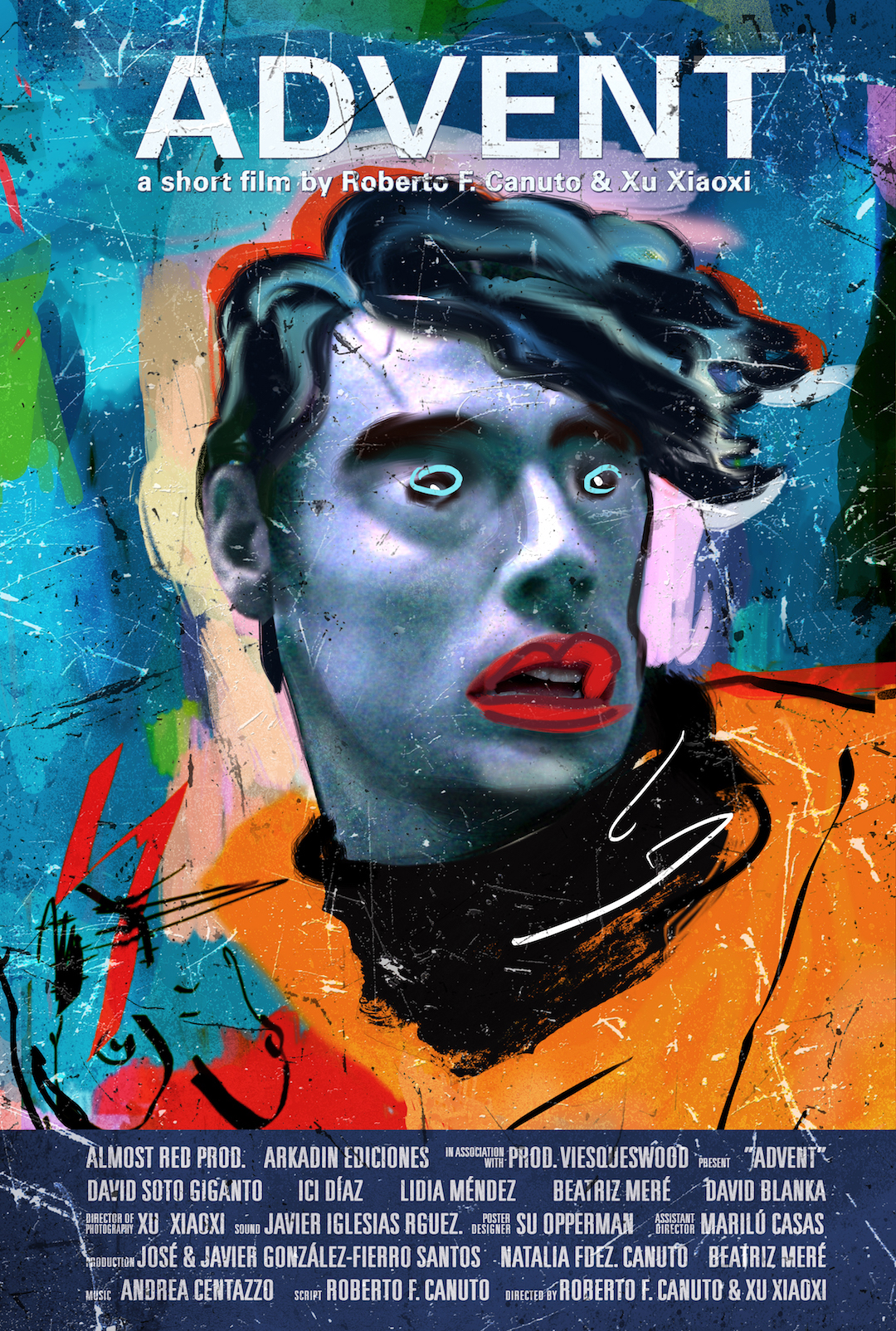
English poster of Advent

Advent (Original asturian Ad-vientu; Chinese: 等候; pinyin: Deng Hou; lit. 'waiting') is a 2016 Spanish and Chinese co-production psychological drama film, written and directed by Roberto F. Canuto and Xu Xiaoxi. It is the first movie of the directors filmed in Spain.

The film is spoken in a local language, the asturian language (something unusual in the Spanish cinema). It was shot in Asturias, with locations in the medieval center of the city of Avilés, the historical Cemetery La Carriona and some beaches and walkways of Carreño, mainly in Perlora and Xivares.

Advent is a psychological mystery drama film that tells the story of Suso, a dazed young unemployed man that tries to discover the identity of an unusual girl, who he spies on a secluded beach, as she reminds him of his dead mother. She runs throwing herselfoff a cliff, but it will not be the last time that she crosses his path. The main character is performed by David Soto Giganto, an actor from the "Youth National Company of Classic Theater" and in the rest of the cast we find actors mainly from the "Dramatic Art Academy of Asturias", like Ici Díaz, o Beatriz Meré, together with other experienced actors as Lidia Méndez o David Blanka.

The world premiere of Advent took place at the 54th Gijón International Film Festival on the 25 of November 2016 and the film obtained the Audience Award Dia D'Asturies for Best Short Film. It will start the international festival circuit in 2017.

=== Floating Melon (2015) ===
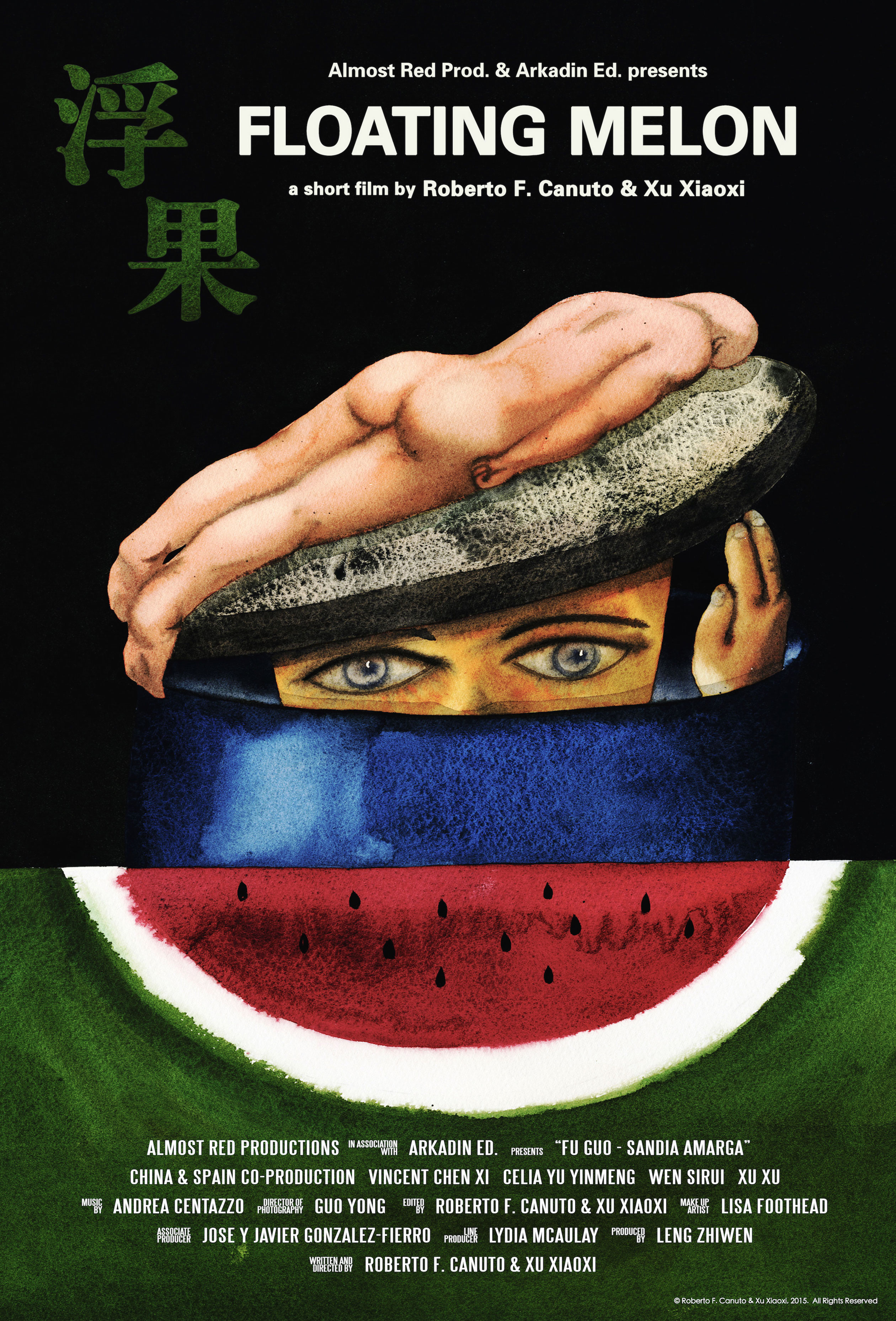
English poster of Floating Melon

Floating Melon (Original Chinese: 浮果; pinyin: Fu Guo; lit. 'floating fruit'; Spanish title Sandía amarga) is a 2015 Spanish and Chinese co-production drama film written and directed by Roberto F. Canuto and Xu Xiaoxi. It is a low budget independent short movie that tells the story of Xiao Cheng, when he finds his lover dead in his bed, after a lethal drug reaction. In the dark roads of Chengdu, Xiao Cheng, scared of the consequences, send a message asking for help to his friend. She thinks that the best solution is to hide the body, but when they return to the apartment, they found the unexpected.

The film has a strong film noir influences and it is performed by non professional actors and it includes themes very delicate, often censured in China, specially the representation of the homosexuality in young people, a community that need to protect themselves due to the lack of protective laws in the country. The story is partially based in true events, but the atmosphere is close to the Film Noir genre, to reflect the only situation where queer people can express themselves, community that needs to live in the shadows of the night in the Chinese society. It tells the story of Xiao Cheng, a young Chinese guy that ask for help to a friend to resolve a big trouble, the guy with whom he spend the afternoon is dead on his bed from the effect of a drug, not something the Chinese authorities look kindly on.

The world premiere of the film was held in Spain, at the 53rd Gijón International Film Festival in November 2015. It received the audience award for best short film, Asturian section, at the 15th Aviles Action Film Festival and at the Audience Choice Award for Best Film and Best Cinematography at the 3rd Asturian Film Festival of Proaza. In China the film premiere was held at an art gallery, Shujingtang Alley Art Space in Chengdu on 12 June 2016 and the reactions were very positive. The premiere in China was held relatively underground (due to the censorship laws of the country).

=== Ni Jing: Thou Shalt Not Steal (2013) ===
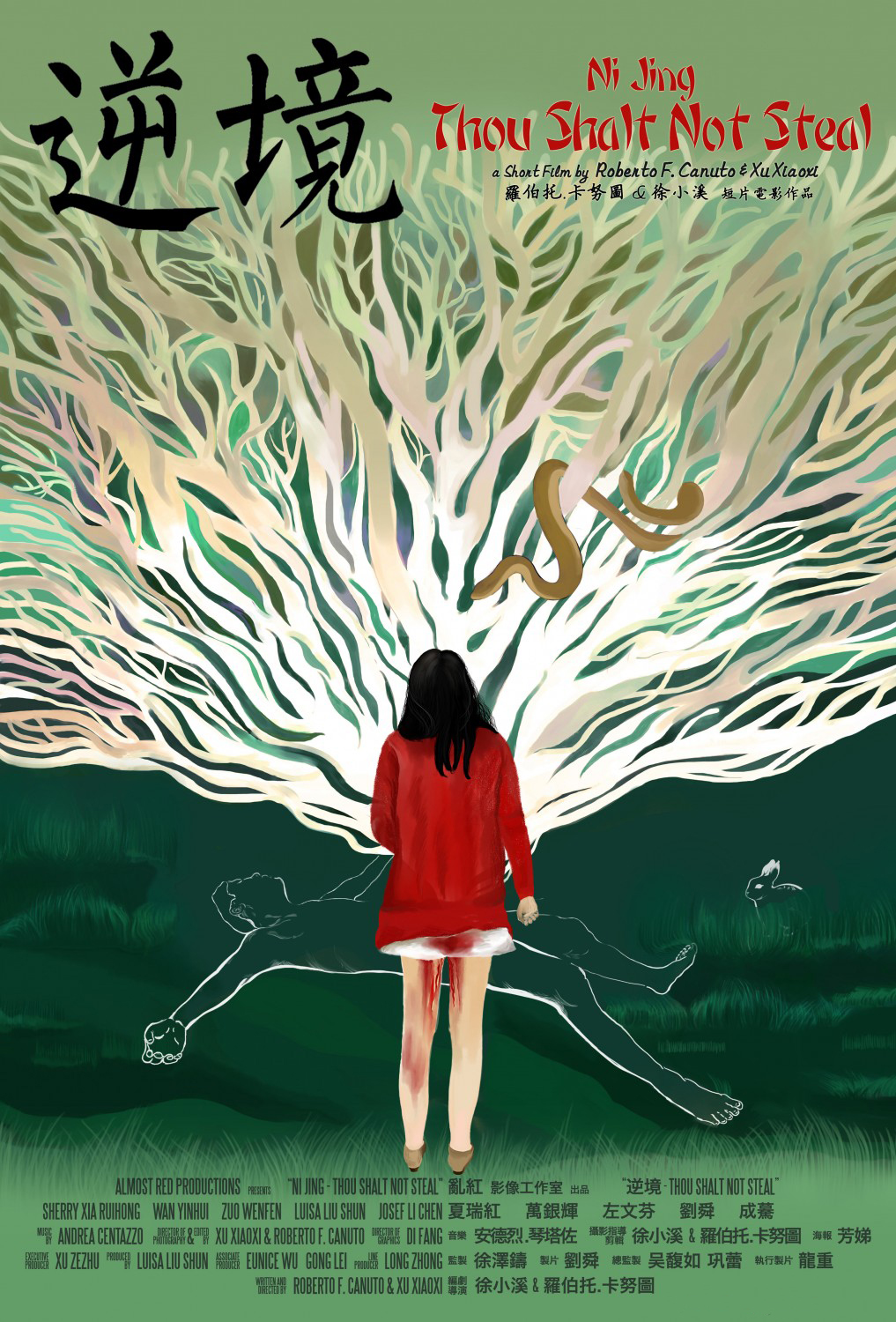
English poster of Ni Jing

Ni Jing: Thou Shalt Not Steal (Original Chinese: 逆境; pinyin: Ni Jing; lit. 'adversity'; Spanish Title Ni Jing: No Robarás) is the first film made in China by Almost Red company and it is a co-production with Spain. It tells the story of a naive Chinese girl who is forced to confront betrayal after she awakes in a remote forest covered in blood. The film received the award for Best Short Film in the World Premier at "Riverside Saginaw International Film Festival", 2013 and the awards for: Best Actress (Sherry Xia Ruihong), runner up Best Short Film, and a nomination for Best Actor (Yinhui Wan) at the 9th Asturian Film Festival, 2014. The Ni Jing: No Robarás Spanish premier took place at the prestigious FICXIXON, Gijón International Film Festival in 2013. The critical reactions in general were very positive:

- "The film represent very truthfully the local society of Chengdu and the good communication among the directors, that belong to different cultures, creates great results" from Fenixnet Entertainment News, China.
- "Audiences at the press screening were captivated for the atmosphere and the rhythm of the film" from Sichuan Daily News, leading newspaper in the region.

=== Desire Street (2011) ===
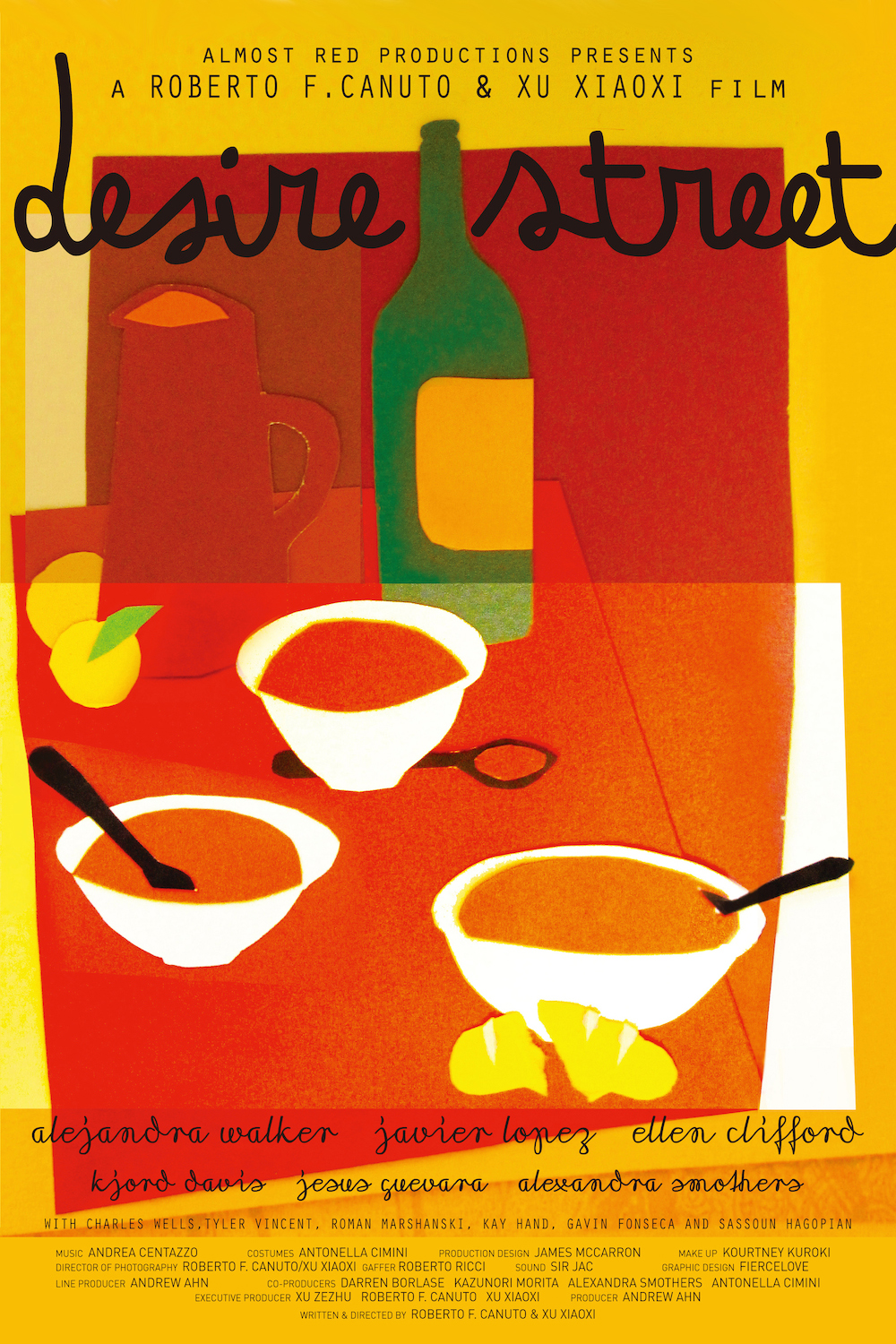
Poster Desire Street

Desire Street (aka "La Calle Del Deseo" or "Calle Deseo") is Roberto F. Canuto & Xu Xiaoxi's first feature film, produced as a graduation work in their Master of Fine Arts at the New York Film Academy (Los Angeles) in Hollywood. The story follows three family members (mother, daughter and son) as they try to survive their loneliness and obsessions by going through different sexual experiences and relationships with a prostitute. "This film has a flamboyant style that is oddly downplayed by characters that tend to be frustrated by the barrenness of their urban living. The protagonists are socially malformed as they struggle with self-identity and self acceptance". The directors take as a reference the Mexican melodramas of the 1960s. They exaggerate the representation of the characters to accentuate the irony that is a basic element in the story, creating many situations of comedy. At the end of the story the family became the main reference for the individual survival. The reception at film festivals was very good and score positive reviews and awards (Best Film at Asturian Film Festival in Spain and Special Mention Best Feature at Mix Mexico International Film Festival ):

- The jury highlight that Desire Street has "a very well structured script, strong story and great characters". From Mix Mexico International Film Festival's Jury, 2011.
- "Desire Street develops, with technical mastery and a good treatment of the script, the generation gap and the family and sexual conflicts in a multiethnic society". From Asturian Film Festival's Jury, 2014
- "The characters could be from an Almodovar movie as they seem to need to behave in extraordinary ways in order to draw some sexual, psychological advantage... The use of subjective camera movement, composition and mirrored reflections are effective in conveying a real sense of false perceptions... The collaborations of Roberto Canuto and Xu Xiaoxi make them the future wave as these two engaging directors bring together fresh insight with redesigned camera work." From Dickie King's review at MTG, 2011.

The premiere of Desire Street in Spain took place in 2014 at the "Asturian Film Festival" and in China at the "Contemporary Art Museum A4" of Sichuan also in 2014 .

=== Toto Forever (2010) ===
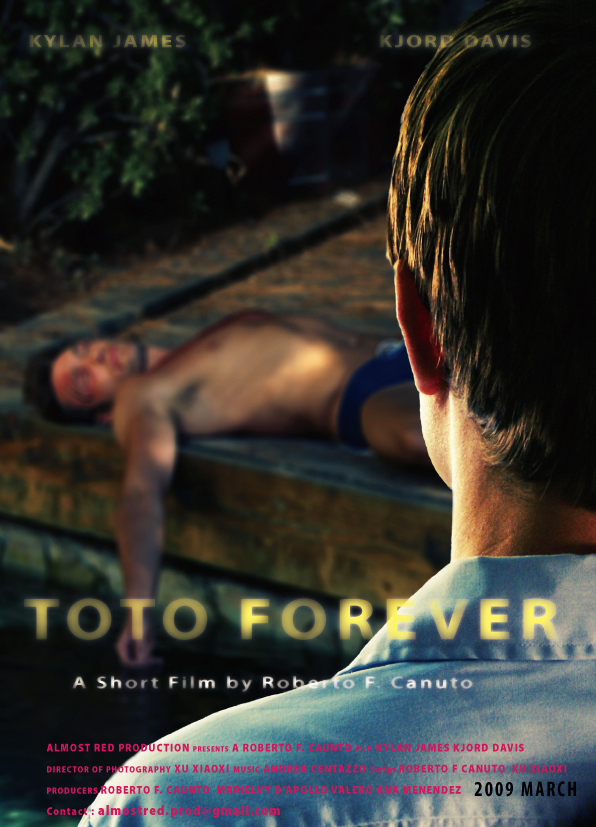
Toto Forever poster

Toto Forever (aka Toto Para Siempre or Siempre Toto), is the first international successful film directed by Roberto F. Canuto and written by Roberto and Xu Xiaoxi. The film participates in over 30 international film festivals, mainly of LGBT theme, with awards as Best Film at "LesGayCinePTY in Panamá 2010", Third Award for Best Short Film at "6th CinegailesAST in Asturias, Spain, 2014", nominated for Best Film at Kashish 1st Mumbai International Film Festival together with other selections and Opening Ceremonies in different venues. It is considered Cult film in many circles, after becoming a Classic in the underground Gay Cinema with many screenings around the globe.

The critical reactions were very positive:

- "This international hit film promises to become one of the new Gay classic movies". From Cultura Pride, 2011 (Panama).
- "Toto Forever effectively invokes an idyllic mood with an undercurrent of danger. The moments that Toto and Mark get to share are very romantic and sensual... Toto Forever is sexy and suspenseful... Canuto's short contains many pleasures." From Michael D. Klemm at Cinemaqueer.com, 2009 (United States).
- "Desire, break, conflict ... Toto Forever is positioned in the drama, in the extreme, in breakdown of the young protagonist to compose a map of sensations that reverses in the hope that exists beyond the borders of everyday life." From El Rollo Higienico, Revista de Arte y Cultura, 2010 (Spain).
- "The angle of photography requires of us to re-examine and not view things is a conventional way. Backward glances are shown through rear view mirror techniques and distorted reflections off a champagne bowl question the reason and nature of what might be obvious. Just as the crystal is multifaceted and reflects and refracts, we are encouraged to examine, kaleidoscopically and appreciate how brilliantly colorful this 'gem' is!" From Dickie King at MTG, 2011 (South Africa).
