= Contralmirante Cordero =

Coordinates: 38°44′S 68°10′W

- Municipality and village
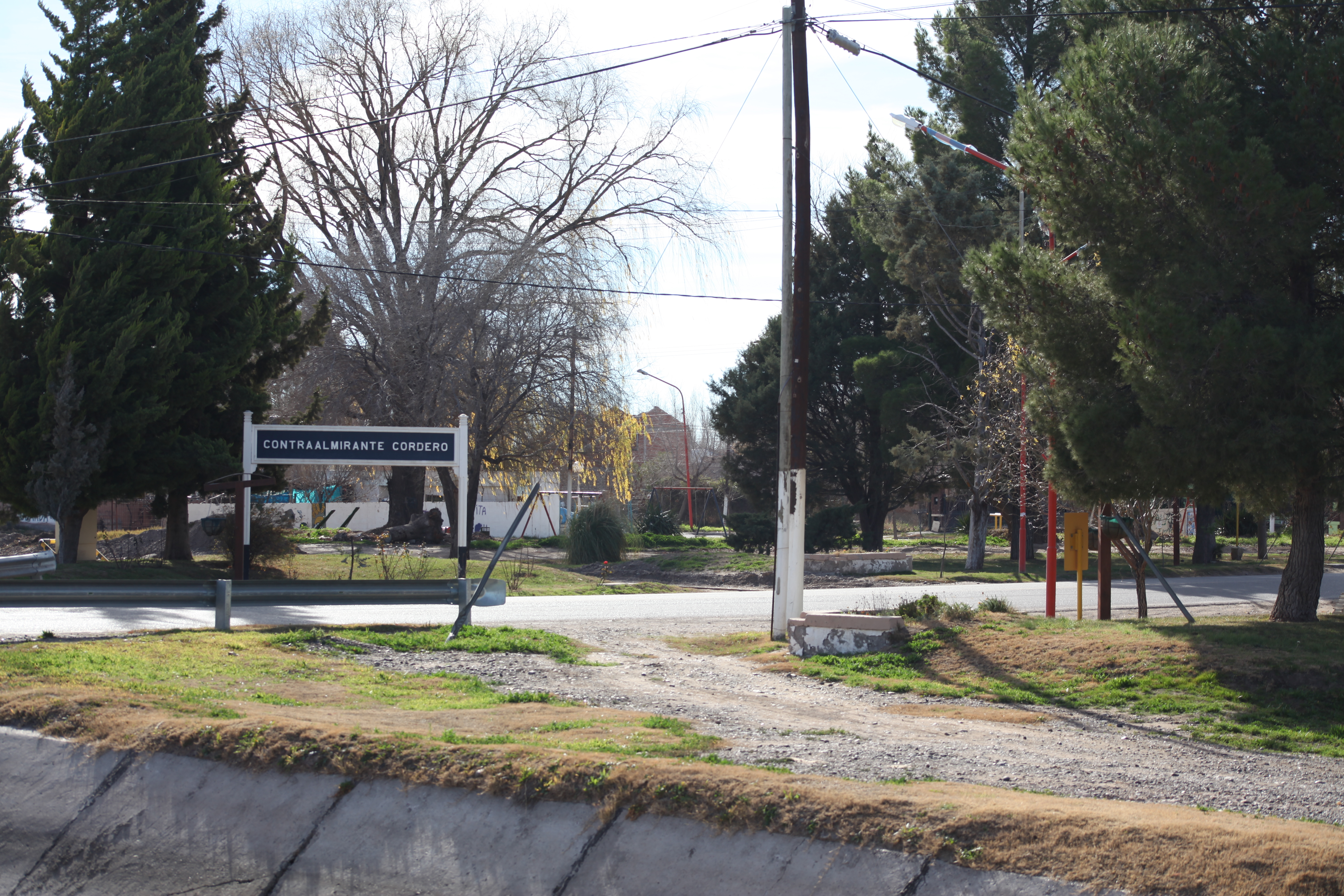
- Interactive map of Contralmirante Cordero
- Country: Argentina
- Province: Río Negro Province

Government
  - Intent: Gustavo Pita (Juntos Somos Río Negro)

Population
  - Total: 3,322
- (2010)
- Time zone: UTC−3 (ART)
- Postal code: R8301
- Climate: BWk
- Website: www.gobiernolocal.gob.ar/?q=node/2070

Contralmirante Cordero is a village and municipality in Río Negro Province in Argentina.
