= General Roca Department, Río Negro =

General Roca Departamento General Roca
- Department
- Location of General Roca
- Coordinates: 39°01′00″S 67°37′00″W
- Country: Argentina
- Province: Río Negro Province
- Head town: General Roca

Area
  - Total: 14,655 km^{2} (5,658 sq mi)

Population (2022)
  - Total: 380,525
  - Density: 25.966/km^{2} (67.250/sq mi)

General Roca is a department of the province of Río Negro (Argentina).
